= Cinema of Italy =

Filmmaking industry in Italy

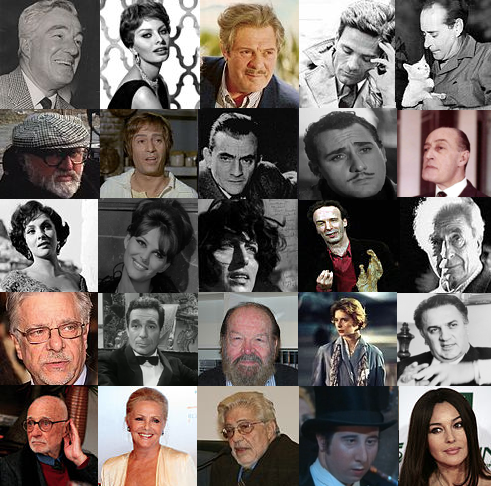
- A collage of notable Italian actors and filmmakers (Note: From top left to bottom right: Vittorio De Sica, Sophia Loren, Marcello Mastroianni, Pier Paolo Pasolini, Roberto Rossellini, Sergio Leone, Nino Manfredi, Luchino Visconti, Alberto Sordi, Totò, Gina Lollobrigida, Claudia Cardinale, Anna Magnani, Roberto Benigni, Michelangelo Antonioni, Giancarlo Giannini, Ugo Tognazzi, Bud Spencer, Isabella Rossellini, Federico Fellini, Mario Monicelli, Virna Lisi, Ettore Scola, Alvaro Vitali, and Monica Bellucci)
- No. of screens: 3,579 (2025)
  - Per capita: 5.9 per 100,000 (2013)
- Main distributors: Walt Disney Italia (21.7%); Eagle Pictures (12.2%); Warner Bros. Italia (10.6%); Universal Pictures (10,6%); Medusa Film (10.4%)

Produced feature films (2025)
- Total: 462 (incl. co-productions)
- Documentary: 218

Number of admissions (2025)
- Total: 68,361,056
  - Per capita: 1.50 (2012)
- National films: 22,780,815 (33.3%)

Gross box office (2025)
- Total: €497 million
- National films: €162 million (32.7%)

The cinema of Italy (Italian: cinema italiano, pronounced [ˈtʃiːnema itaˈljaːno]) comprises the films made within Italy or by Italian directors. Since its beginning, Italian cinema has influenced film movements worldwide. Italy is one of the birthplaces of art cinema and the stylistic aspect of film has been one of the most important factors in the history of Italian film. As of 2018, Italian films have won 14 Academy Awards for Best Foreign Language Film (the most of any country) as well as 12 Palmes d'Or (the second-most of any country), one Academy Award for Best Picture and many Golden Lions and Golden Bears.

The history of Italian cinema began a few months after the Lumière brothers began motion picture exhibitions. The first Italian director is considered to be Vittorio Calcina, a collaborator of the Lumière Brothers later active from 1896 to 1905. The first films date back to 1896 and were made in the main cities of the Italian peninsula. These brief experiments immediately met the curiosity of the popular class, encouraging operators to produce new films until they laid the foundations for the birth of a true film industry. In the early 1900s, artistic and epic films such as Otello (1906), The Last Days of Pompeii (1908), L'Inferno (1911), Quo Vadis (1913), and Cabiria (1914), were made as adaptations of books or stage plays. Italian filmmakers were using complex set designs, lavish costumes, and record budgets, to produce pioneering films. In the early years of the 20th century, silent cinema developed, bringing numerous Italian stars to the forefront until the end of World War I.

The oldest European avant-garde cinema movement, Italian futurism, took place in the late 1910s. After a period of decline in the 1920s, the Italian film industry was revitalized in the 1930s with the arrival of sound film. A popular Italian genre during this period, the Telefoni Bianchi, consisted of comedies with glamorous backgrounds. Calligrafismo was instead in sharp contrast to Telefoni, Bianchi-American style comedies and is rather artistic, highly formalistic, expressive in complexity and deals mainly with contemporary literary material. While Italy's Fascist government provided financial support for the nation's film industry, notably the construction of the Cinecittà studios (the largest film studio in Europe), it also engaged in censorship, and thus many Italian films produced in the late 1930s were propaganda films. A new era took place at the end of World War II with the birth of the influential Italian neorealist movement, reaching a vast consensus of audiences and critics throughout the post-war period, and which launched the directorial careers of Luchino Visconti, Roberto Rossellini, and Vittorio De Sica. Neorealism declined in the late 1950s in favour of lighter films, such as those of the Commedia all'italiana genre and important directors like Federico Fellini and Michelangelo Antonioni. Actresses such as Sophia Loren, Giulietta Masina and Gina Lollobrigida achieved international stardom during this period.

From the mid-1950s to the end of the 1970s, Commedia all'italiana and many other genres arose due to auteur cinema, and Italian cinema reached a position of great prestige both nationally and abroad. The Spaghetti Western achieved popularity in the mid-1960s, peaking with Sergio Leone's Dollars Trilogy, which featured enigmatic scores by composer Ennio Morricone, which have become popular culture icons of the Western genre. Erotic Italian thrillers, or giallo, produced by directors such as Mario Bava and Dario Argento in the 1970s, influenced the horror genre worldwide. Since the 1980s, due to multiple factors, Italian production has gone through a crisis that has not prevented the production of quality films in the 1990s and into the new millennium, thanks to a revival of Italian cinema, awarded and appreciated all over the world. During the 1980s and 1990s, directors such as Ermanno Olmi, Bernardo Bertolucci, Giuseppe Tornatore, Gabriele Salvatores and Roberto Benigni brought critical acclaim back to Italian cinema, while the most popular directors of the 2000s and 2010s were Matteo Garrone, Paolo Sorrentino, Marco Bellocchio, Nanni Moretti and Marco Tullio Giordana.

The country is also famed for its prestigious Venice Film Festival, the oldest film festival in the world, held annually since 1932 and awarding the Golden Lion; In 2008 the Venice Days ("Giornate degli Autori"), a section held in parallel to the Venice Film Festival, has produced in collaboration with Cinecittà studios and the Ministry of Cultural Heritage a list of a 100 films that have changed the collective memory of the country between 1942 and 1978: the "100 Italian films to be saved".

The David di Donatello Awards are one of the most prestigious awards at national level. Presented by the Accademia del Cinema Italiano in the Cinecittà studios, during the awards ceremony, the winners are given a miniature reproduction of the famous statue. The finalist candidates for the award, as per tradition, are first received at the Quirinal Palace by the President of Italy. The event is the Italian equivalent of the American Academy Awards.

== History ==
=== 1890s ===
Video of Il finto storpio al Castello Sforzesco ("The fake cripple at the Castello Sforzesco") by Italo Pacchioni (1896)

The history of Italian cinema began a few months after the French Lumière brothers, who made the first public screening of a film on 28 December 1895, an event considered the birth of cinema, began motion picture exhibitions. The first Italian director is considered to be Vittorio Calcina, a collaborator of the Lumière Brothers, who became the official photographer of the House of Savoy, the Italian ruling dynasty from 1861 to 1946. In this role he filmed in 1896 the first Italian film, Sua Maestà il Re Umberto e Sua Maestà la Regina Margherita a passeggio per il parco a Monza ("His Majesty the King Umberto and Her Majesty the Queen Margherita strolling through the Monza Park"), believed to have been lost until it was rediscovered by the Cineteca Nazionale in 1979.

The Lumière brothers commenced public screenings in Italy in 1896 starting in March, in Rome and Milan; in April in Naples, Salerno and Bari; in June in Livorno; in August in Bergamo, Bologna and Ravenna; in October in Ancona; and in December in Turin, Pescara and Reggio Calabria. Not long before, in 1895, Filoteo Alberini patented his "kinetograph", a shooting and projecting device not unlike that of the Lumières brothers.

Italian Lumière trainees produced short films documenting everyday life and comic strips in the late 1890s and early 1900s. Before long, other pioneers made their way. Italo Pacchioni, Arturo Ambrosio, Giovanni Vitrotti and Roberto Omegna were also active. The success of the short films was immediate. The cinema fascinated with its ability to show distant geographic realities with unprecedented precision and, vice versa, to immortalize everyday moments. Sporting events, local events, intense road traffic, the arrival of a train, visits by famous people, but also natural disasters and calamities are filmed.

Titles of the time include, Arrivo del treno alla Stazione di Milano ("Arrival of the train at Milan station") (1896), La battaglia di neve ("The snow battle") (1896), La gabbia dei matti ("The madmen's cage") (1896), Ballo in famiglia ("Family dance") (1896), Il finto storpio al Castello Sforzesco ("The fake cripple at the Castello Sforzesco") (1896) and La Fiera di Porta Genova ("The fair of Porta Genova") (1898), all shot by Italo Pacchioni, who was also the inventor of a camera and projector, inspired by the cinematograph of Lumière brothers, kept at the Cineteca Italiana in Milan.

If the interest of the masses were enthusiastic, the technological novelty would likely be snubbed, at least at the beginning, by intellectuals and the press. Despite initial doubt, in just two years, cinema climbs the hierarchy of society, intriguing the wealthier classes. On 28 January 1897, prince Victor Emmanuel and princess Elena of Montenegro attended a screening organized by Vittorio Calcina, in a room of the Pitti Palace in Florence. Interested in experimenting with the new medium, they were filmed in S.A.R. il Principe di Napoli e la Principessa Elena visitano il battistero di S. Giovanni a Firenze ("Their real heights the Prince of Naples and Princess Elena visit the baptistery of Saint John in Florence") and on the day of their wedding in Dimostrazione popolare alle LL. AA. i Principi sposi (al Pantheon – Roma) ("Popular demonstration at their heights the princes spouses (at the Pantheon – Rome)").

=== 1900s ===
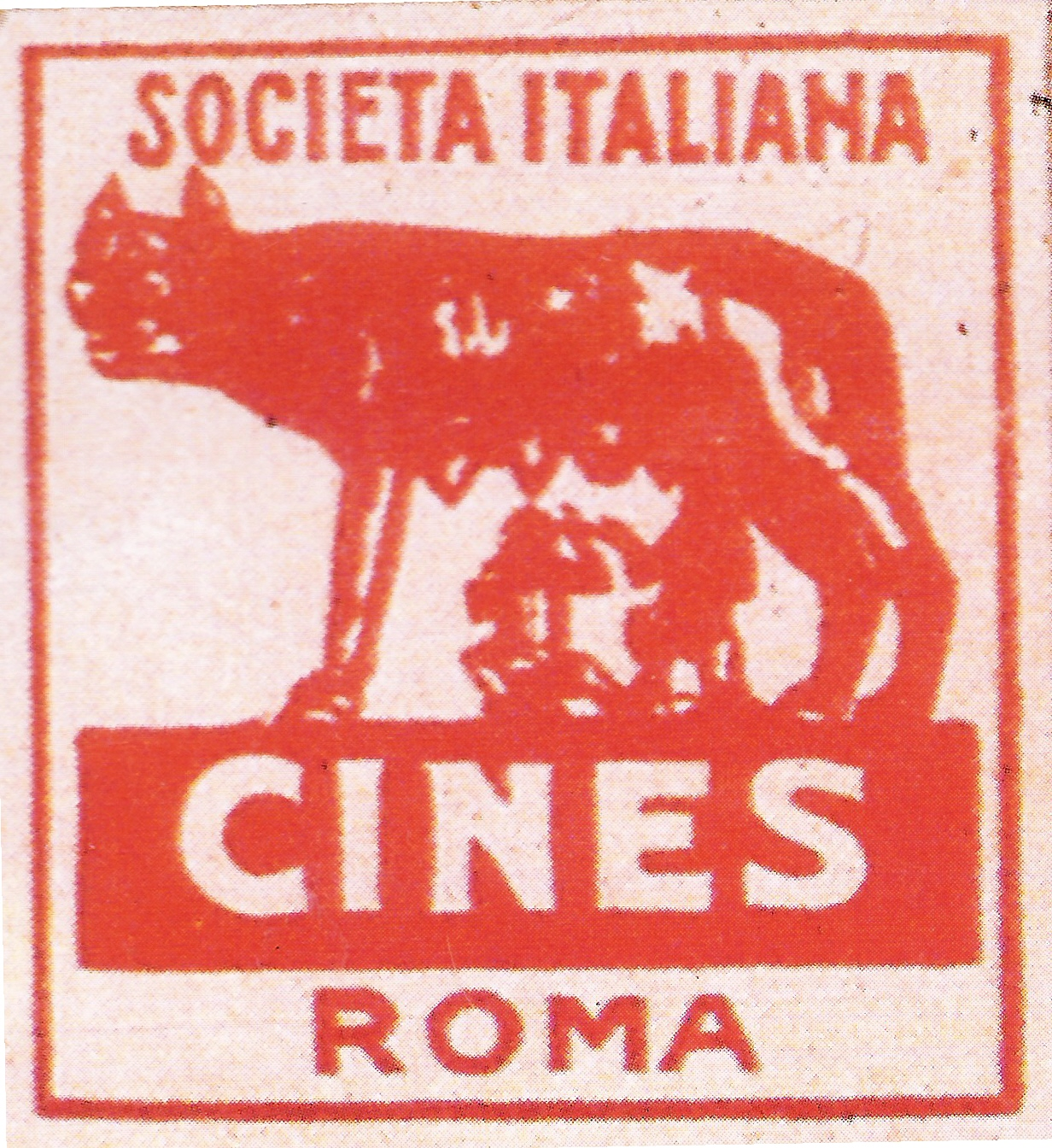
The logo of Cines, with the Capitoline Wolf in the centre

In the early years of the 20th century, the phenomenon of itinerant cinemas developed throughout Italy, providing literacy of the visual medium. This innovative form of spectacle ran out, in a short time, a number of optical attractions such as magic lanterns, cinematographers, stereoscopes, panoramas and dioramas that had fueled the European imagination and favoured the circulation of a common market for images. The nascent Italian cinema, therefore, is still linked to the traditional shows of the commedia dell'arte or to those typical of circus folklore. Public screenings take place in the streets, in cafes or in variety theatres in the presence of a swindler who has the task of promoting and enriching the story.

Between 1903 and 1909 the itinerant cinema Italian film was quieting, until then considered as a freak phenomenon, took on consistency assuming the characteristics of an authentic industry, led by four major organizations: Titanus (originally Monopolio Lombardo), the first Italian film production company and the largest and probably the most famous film house in Italy founded by Gustavo Lombardo at Naples in 1904, Cines, based in Rome; and the Turin-based companies Ambrosio Film and Itala Film. Other companies soon followed in Milan, and these early companies quickly attained a respectable production quality and were able to market their products both within Italy and abroad. Early Italian films typically consisted of adaptations of books or stage plays, such as Mario Caserini's Otello (1906) and Arturo Ambrosio's 1908 The Last Days of Pompeii, an adaptation of the homonymous novel by Edward Bulwer-Lytton. Also popular during this period were films about historical figures, such as Caserini's Beatrice Cenci (1909) and Ugo Falena's Lucrezia Borgia (1910).

Video of La presa di Roma ("The Capture of Rome") by Filoteo Alberini (1905, six minute version)

In 1905, Cines inaugurated the genre of the historical film, which in this decade gave a great fortune to many Italian filmmakers. One of the first of these films was La presa di Roma (1905), lasting 10 minutes, and made by Filoteo Alberini. The operator employs for the first time actors of theatrical origin, exploiting the historical argument in a popular and pedagogical key. The film, assimilating Manzoni's lesson of making historical fiction plausible, reconstructs the Capture of Rome on 20 September 1870.

The discovery of the visual potential of the cinematographic medium encouraged the development of a cinema with broad ambitions, capable of incorporating all the cultural and historical suggestions of the country. Dozens of characters from texts make their appearance on the big screen such as the Count of Monte Cristo, Giordano Bruno, Judith beheading Holofernes, Francesca da Rimini, Lorenzino de' Medici, Rigoletto, Count Ugolino and others. From an iconographic point of view, the main references are the great Renaissance and neoclassical artists, as well as symbolists and popular illustrations.

=== 1910s ===
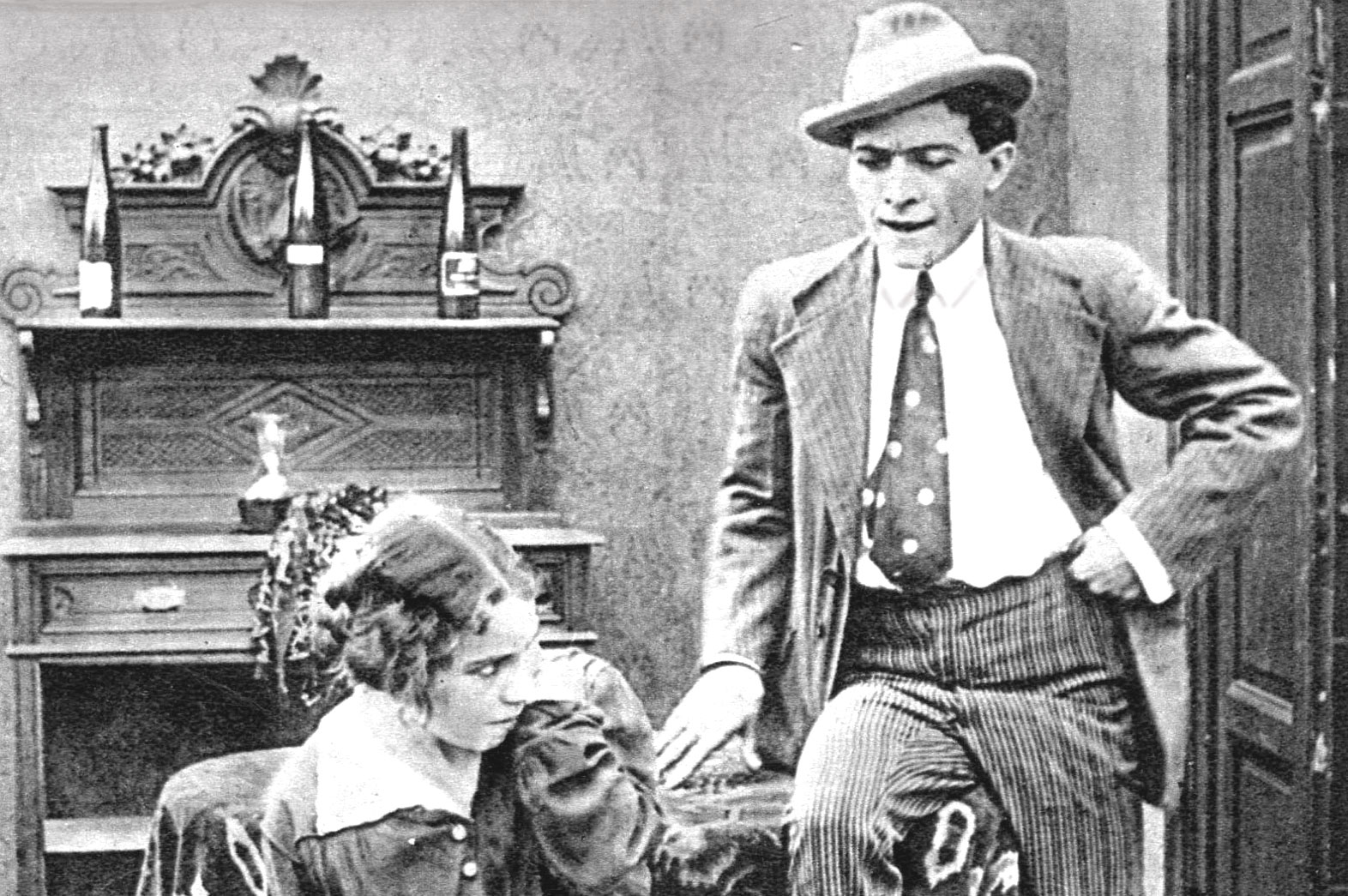
Lost in the Dark by Nino Martoglio (1914), considered a precursor to the Italian neorealism movement of the 1940s and 1950s.

In the 1910s, the Italian film industry developed rapidly. In 1912, the year of the greatest expansion, 569 films were produced in Turin, 420 in Rome and 120 in Milan. Popular early Italian actors included Emilio Ghione, Alberto Collo, Bartolomeo Pagano, Amleto Novelli, Lyda Borelli, Ida Carloni Talli, Lidia Quaranta and Maria Jacobini.

Lost in the Dark, silent drama film directed by Nino Martoglio and produced in 1914, documented life in the slums of Naples, and is considered a precursor to the Italian neorealism movement of the 1940s and 1950s. The only surviving copy of this film was destroyed by Nazi German forces during the World War II. This film is based on a 1901 play of the same title by Roberto Bracco.

In the three years leading up to World War I, as production consolidates, mythological, comedy and drama films are exported all over the world. In the meantime, in the actor's field, the phenomenon of stardom was born which for a few years will experience unstoppable success. With the end of the decade, Rome definitively established itself as the main production center; this will remain, despite the crises that will periodically shake the industry, right up to the present day.

==== Historical blockbusters (1910s) ====
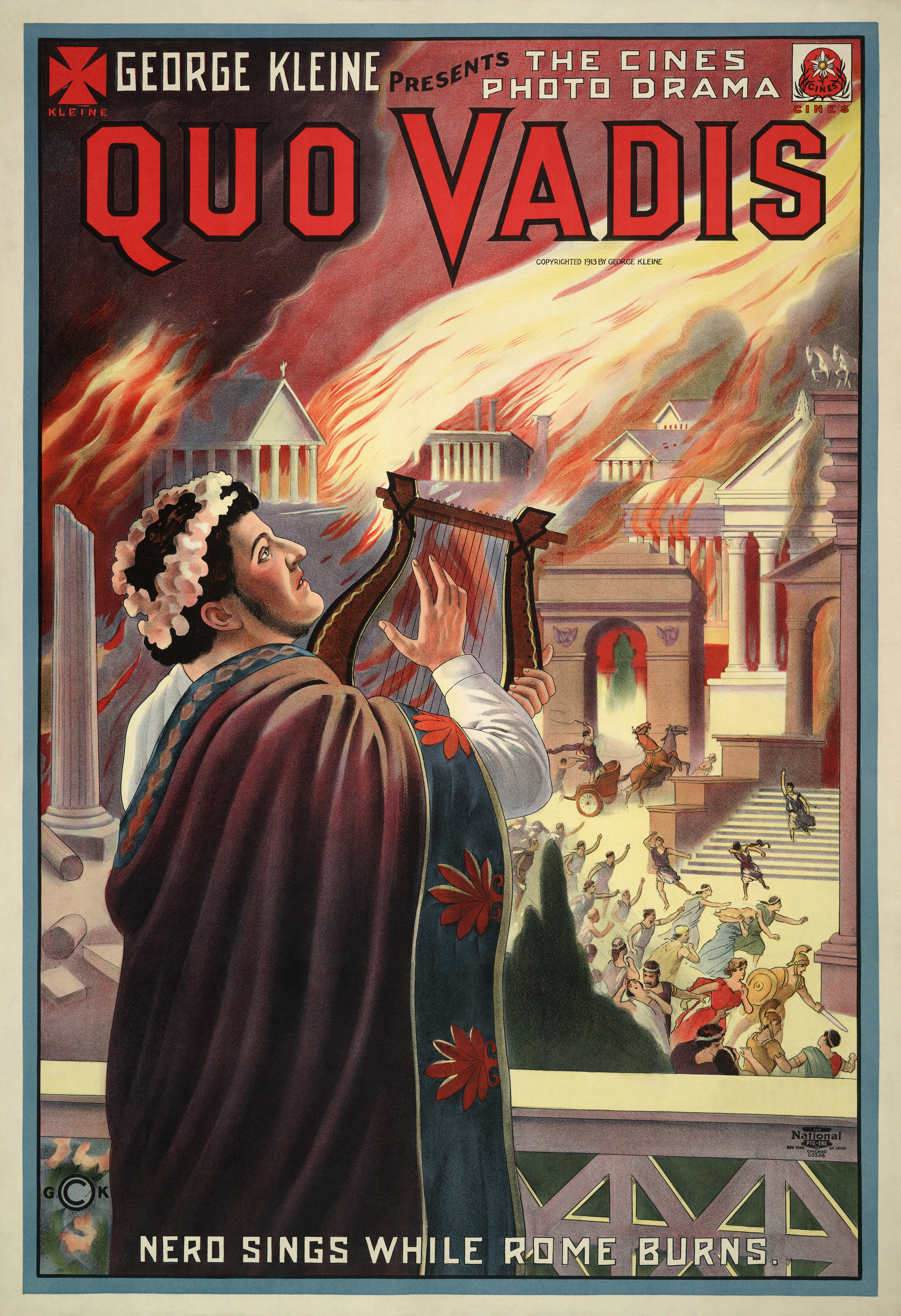
Quo Vadis (1913), regarded as one of the first blockbusters in the history of cinema

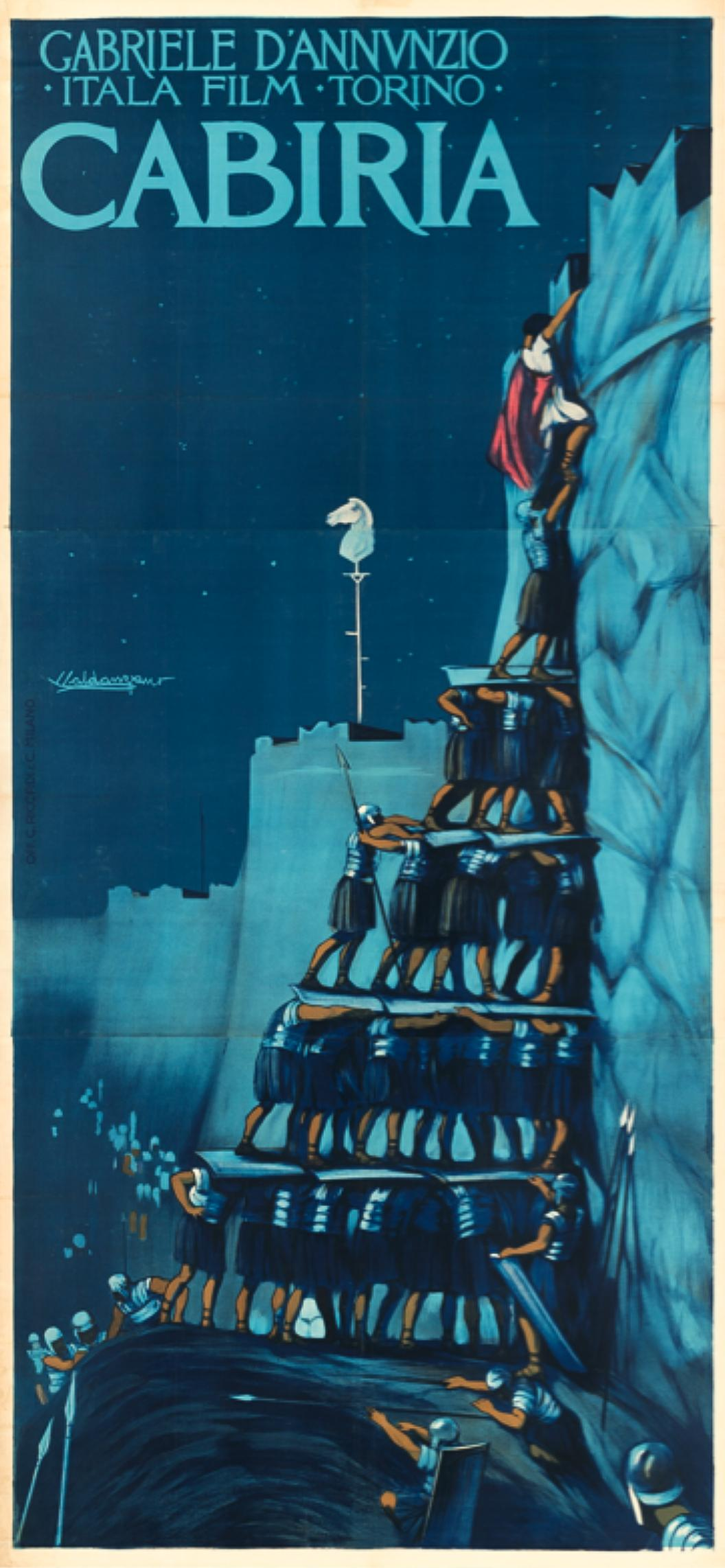
Cabiria (1914), the first epic film ever made

The archetypes of this film genre were The Last Days of Pompeii (1908), by Arturo Ambrosio and Luigi Maggi and Nero (1909), by Maggi himself and Arrigo Frusta. This last film was inspired by the work of Pietro Cossa who is iconographically based on the etchings of Bartolomeo Pinelli, neoclassicism and the show Nero, or the Destruction of Rome represented by the Barnum circus. Followed by Marin Faliero, Doge of Venice (1909), by Giuseppe De Liguoro, Otello (1909) by Yambo and L'Odissea (1911), by Bertolini, Padovan and De Liguoro.

L'Inferno, produced by Milano Films in 1911, even before being an adaptation of Dante's canticle, was a cinematic translation of Gustave Doré's engravings that experiments with the integration of optical effects and stage action, and it was the first Italian feature film ever made. The Last Days of Pompeii (1913), by Eleuterio Rodolfi, used innovative special effects.

Enrico Guazzoni's 1913 film Quo Vadis was one of the first blockbusters in the history of cinema, using thousands of extras and a lavish set design. The international success of the film marked the maturation of the genre and allows Guazzoni to make increasingly spectacular films such as Antony and Cleopatra (1913) and Julius Caesar (1914). Giovanni Pastrone's 1914 film Cabiria was an even larger production, requiring two years and a record budget to produce, it was the first epic film ever made and it is considered the most famous Italian silent film. It was also the first film in history to be shown in the White House. After Guazzoni came Emilio Ghione, Febo Mari, Carmine Gallone, Giulio Antamoro and many others who contributed to the expansion of the genre.

After the great success of Cabiria, with the changing tastes of the public and the first signs of the industrial crisis, the genre began to show signs of crisis. Pastrone's plan to adapt the Bible with thousands of extras remained unfulfilled. Antamoro's Christus (1916) and Guazzoni's The Crusaders (1918) remained notable for their iconographic complexity but offered no substantial novelties. Despite sporadic attempts to reconnect with the grandeur of the past, the trend of historical blockbusters was interrupted at the beginning of the 1920s.

==== Proto-giallo (1910s) ====
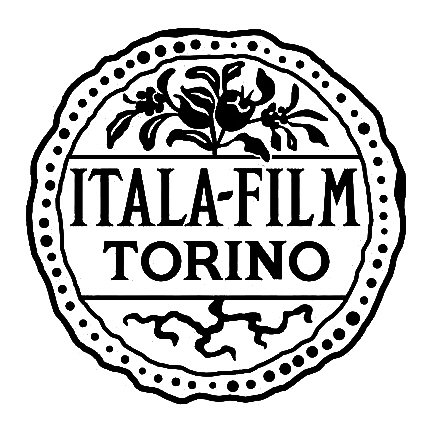
The logo of Itala Film

In the first and second decades of the 20th century, many crime and mystery films were produced, drawing on Italian and foreign literature that lent itself to film adaptation. Precursors of what would later become the giallo were made and distributed in the early years of Italian cinema. The production houses most active in the 1910s included Cines, Ambrosio Film, Itala Film, Aquila Films, Milano Films and others, while titles such as Il delitto del magistrato (1907), Il cadavere misterioso (1908), Il piccolo Sherlock Holmes (1909), L'abisso (1910) and Alibi atroce (1910) were popular with early cinema audiences. Their popularity encouraged the film industry to invest further, since the films were also distributed in the French and Anglo-Saxon markets. Directors active in this field, such as Oreste Mentasti, Luigi Maggi, Arrigo Frusta and Ubaldo Maria Del Colle, together with many lesser-known ones, directed several dozen films in which the classic narrative elements of the silent proto-giallo (mystery, crime, investigation and a final twist) constitute the structural basis of the films.

Elvira Notari, the first female director ever in Italy and one of the premieres in the history of world cinema, directed Carmela, la sartina di Montesanto (1916). While in Palermo, Lucarelli Film produced La cassaforte n. 8 (1914) and Ipnotismo (1914), the Azzurri Film La regina della notte (1915), the Lumen Film Il romanzo fantastico del Dr. Mercanton o il giustiziere invisibile (1915) and Profumo mortale (1915), all films ascribable to the proto-giallo that multiplied in the following decades, becoming preparatory to the subsequent birth of the giallo.

==== Stardom (1910s) ====
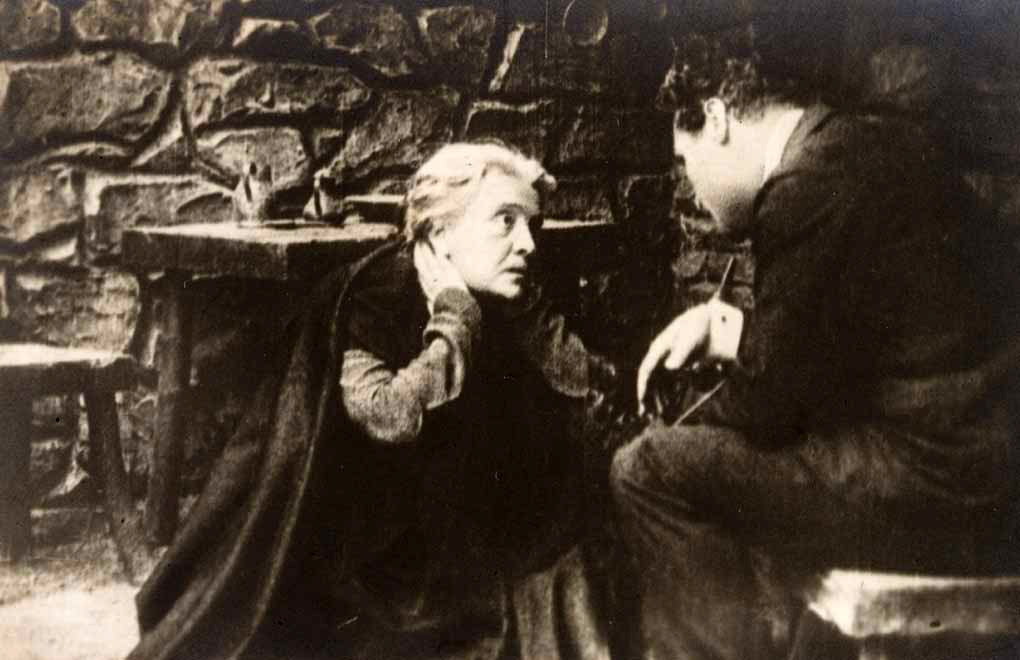
Cenere by Febo Mari (1917)

Between 1913 and 1920 there was the rise, development and decline of the phenomenon of cinematographic stardom, born with the release of Ma l'amor mio non muore (1913), by Mario Caserini. The film had great success with the public and encoded the setting and aesthetics of female stardom. Within just a few years, Eleonora Duse, Pina Menichelli, Rina De Liguoro, Leda Gys, Hesperia, Vittoria Lepanto, Mary Cleo Tarlarini and Italia Almirante Manzini established themselves.

Films such as Fior di male (1914), by Carmine Gallone, Il fuoco (1915), by Giovanni Pastrone, Rapsodia satanica (1917), by Nino Oxilia and Cenere (1917), by Febo Mari, changed the national costume, imposing canons of beauty, role models and objects of desire. These models, strongly stylized according to the cultural and artistic trends of the time, moved away from naturalism in favor of melodramatic acting, pictorial gesture and theatrical pose; all favored by the incessant use of close-up which focuses the attention on the expressiveness of the actress.

==== Comic short films (1910s) ====
The most successful comedian in Italy was André Deed, better known in Italy as Cretinetti, star of comic short film for Itala Film. Its success paved the way for Marcel Fabre (Robinet), Ernesto Vaser (Fricot) and many others. The only actor of a certain substance, however, was Ferdinand Guillaume, who became famous with the stage name of Polidor.

The historical interest of these films lay in their ability to reveal the aspirations and fears of a petty-bourgeois society torn between the desire for affirmation and the uncertainties of the present. It was significant that the protagonists of Italian comedians never place themselves in open contrast with society or embody the desire for social revenge (as happens for example with Charlie Chaplin), but rather tried to integrate into a strongly desired world.

==== Futurist cinema (1910s) ====
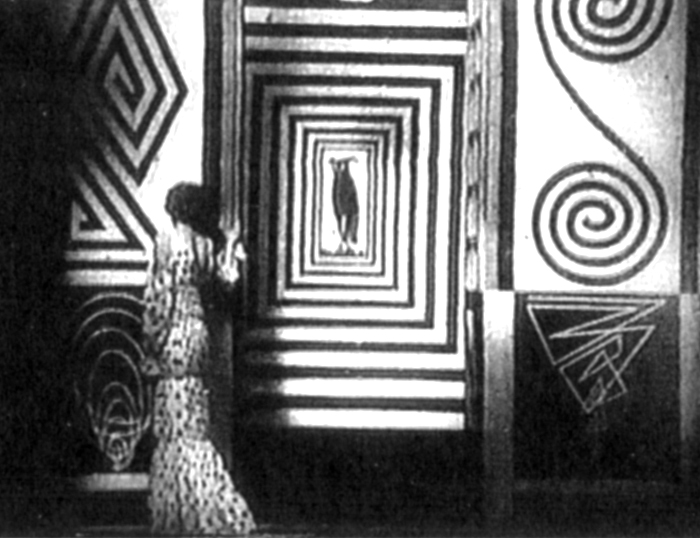
Thaïs by Anton Giulio Bragaglia (1917)

Italian futurist cinema was the oldest movement of European avant-garde cinema. Italian futurism, an artistic and social movement, impacted the Italian film industry from 1916 to 1919. It influenced Russian Futurist cinema and German Expressionist cinema. Its cultural importance was considerable and influenced all subsequent avant-gardes, as well as some authors of narrative cinema; its echo expands to the dreamlike visions of some films by Alfred Hitchcock.

Futurism emphasized dynamism, speed, technology, youth, violence, and objects such as the car, the airplane, and the industrial city. Its key figures were the Italians Filippo Tommaso Marinetti, Umberto Boccioni, Carlo Carrà, Fortunato Depero, Gino Severini, Giacomo Balla, and Luigi Russolo. It glorified modernity and aimed to liberate Italy from the weight of its past.

The 1916 Manifesto of Futuristic Cinematography was signed by Filippo Tommaso Marinetti, Armando Ginna, Bruno Corra, Giacomo Balla and others. To the Futurists, cinema was an ideal art form, being a fresh medium, and able to be manipulated by speed, special effects and editing. Most of the futuristic-themed films of this period have been lost, but critics cite Thaïs (1917) by Anton Giulio Bragaglia as one of the most influential, serving as the main inspiration for German Expressionist cinema in the following decade.

The Italian film industry struggled against rising foreign competition in the years following World War I. Several major studios, among them Cines and Ambrosio, formed the Unione Cinematografica Italiana to coordinate a national strategy for film production. This effort was largely unsuccessful, however, due to a wide disconnect between production and exhibition (some movies weren't released until several years after they were produced).

=== 1920s ===
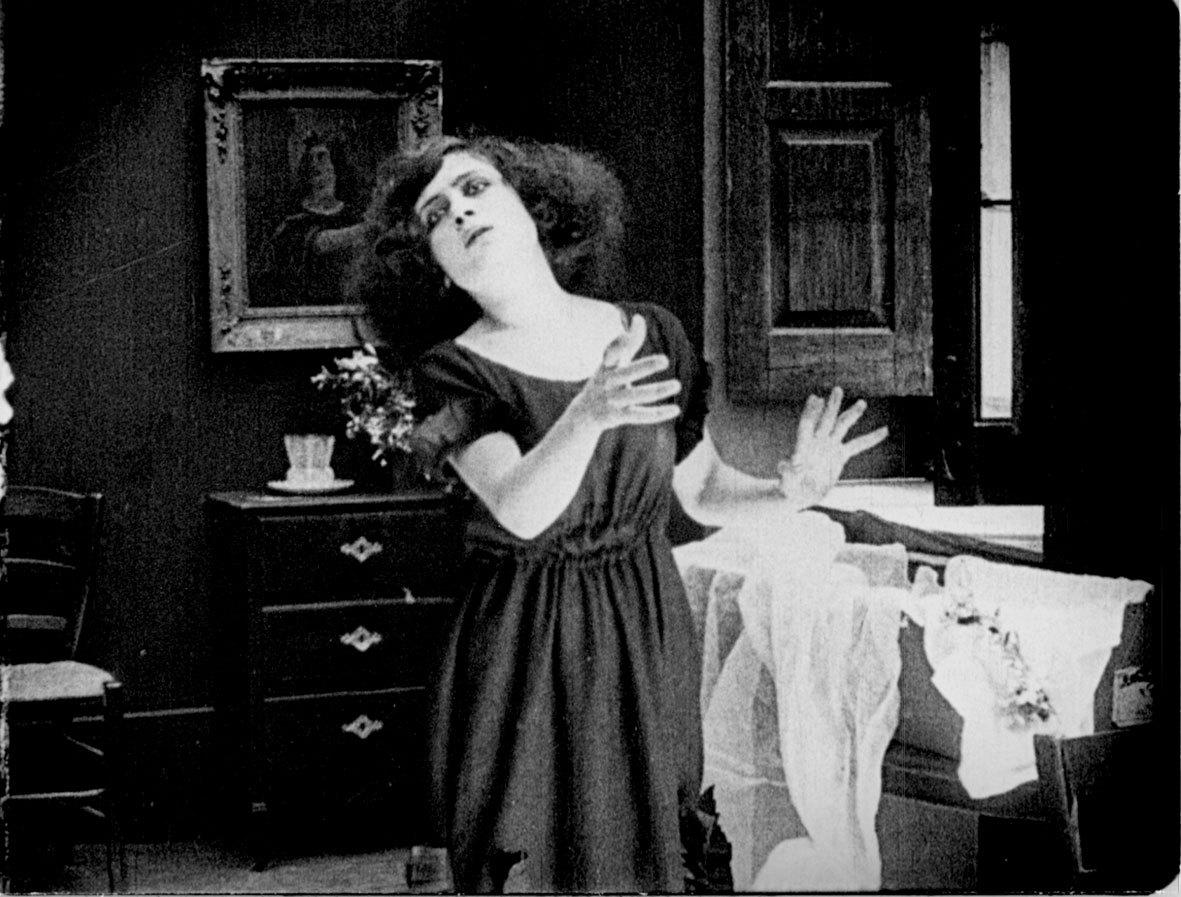
'A Santanotte by Elvira Notari (1922)

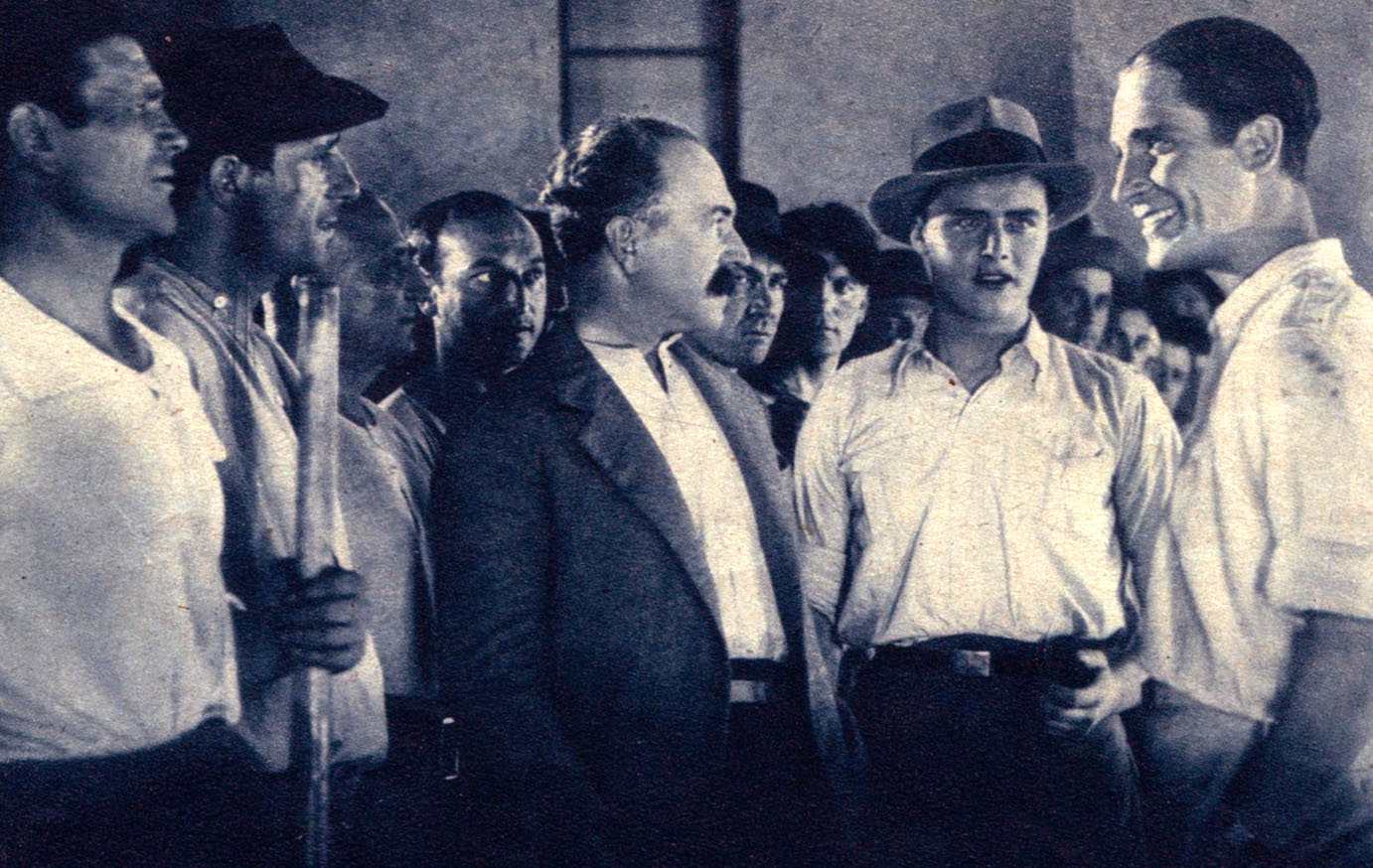
Sun by Alessandro Blasetti (1929)

With the end of World War I, Italian cinema went through a period of crisis due to many factors such as production disorganization, increased costs, technological backwardness, loss of foreign markets and inability to cope with international competition, in particular with that of Hollywood. The main causes included the lack of a generational change with a production still dominated by filmmakers and producers of literary training, unable to face the challenges of modernity. The first half of the 1920s marked a sharp decrease in production; from 350 films produced in 1921 to 60 in 1924.

Literature and theatre are still the preferred narrative sources. The feuilletons resist, mostly taken from classical or popular texts and directed by specialists such as Roberto Roberti and the religious blockbusters of Giulio Antamoro. On the basis of the latest generation of divas, a sentimental cinema for women spread, centred on figures on the margins of society who, instead of struggling to emancipate themselves (as happens in contemporary Hollywood cinema), go through an authentic ordeal in order to preserve their own virtue. Protest and rebellion by the female protagonists are out of the question. It is a strongly conservative cinema, tied to social rules upset by the war and in the process of dissolution throughout Europe. An exemplary case is that of A Woman's Story (1920) by Eugenio Perego, which uses an original narrative construction to propose a 19th-century morality with melodramatic tones.

A particular genre is that of a realist setting, due to the work of the first female director of Italian cinema, Elvira Notari, who directs numerous films influenced by popular theatre and taken from famous dramas, Neapolitan songs, appendix novels or inspired by facts of chronicle. Another film with a realist setting is Lost in the Dark (1914) by director Nino Martoglio, considered by critics as a prime example of neorealist cinema.

The revival of Italian cinema took place at the end of the decade with the production of larger-scale films. During this period, a group of intellectuals close to the fortnightly cinematografo led by Alessandro Blasetti launched a program that was as simple as it was ambitious. Aware of the Italian cultural backwardness, they decided to break all ties with the previous tradition through a rediscovery of the peasant world, hitherto practically absent in Italian cinema. Sun (1929) by Alessandro Blasetti shows the evident influence of the Soviet and German avant-gardes in an attempt to renew Italian cinema in accordance with the interests of the fascist regime. Rails (1929) by Mario Camerini blends the traditional genre of comedy with kammerspiel and realist film, revealing the director's ability to outline the characters of the middle class. While not comparable to the best results of international cinema of the period, the works of Camerini and Blasetti testify to a generational transition between Italian directors and intellectuals, and above all an emancipation from literary models and an approach to the tastes of the public.

=== 1930s ===
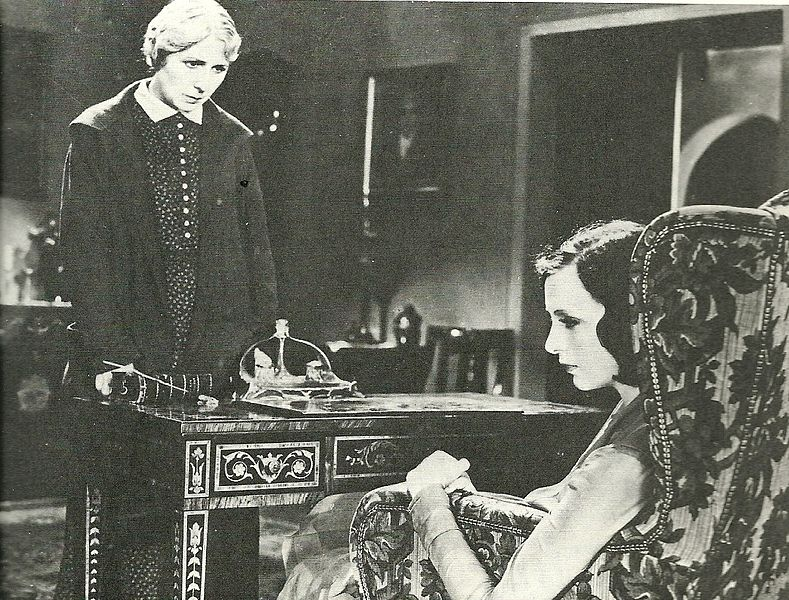
The Song of Love by Gennaro Righelli (1930), the first Italian talking picture

The sound cinema arrived in Italy in 1930, three years after the release of The Jazz Singer (1927), and immediately led to a debate on the validity of spoken cinema and its relationship with the theatre. Some directors enthusiastically face the new challenge. The advent of talkies led to stricter censorship by the Fascist government.

The first Italian talking picture was The Song of Love (1930) by Gennaro Righelli, which was a great success with the public. Alessandro Blasetti also experimented with the use of an optical track for sound in the film Resurrection (1931), shot before The Song of Love but released a few months later. Similar to Righelli's film is What Scoundrels Men Are! (1932) by Mario Camerini, which has the merit of making Vittorio De Sica debut on the screens. Historical films such as Blasetti's 1860 (1934) and Carmine Gallone's Scipio Africanus: The Defeat of Hannibal (1937) were also popular during this period.

With the transition to sound cinema, most of the Italian silent film actors, still linked to theatrical stylization, find themselves disqualified. The era of divas, dandies and strongmen, who barely survived the 1920s, is definitely over. Even if some performers will move on to directing or producing, the arrival of sound favours the generational change and the consequent modernization of the structures.

Italian-born director Frank Capra received three Academy Awards for Best Director for the films It Happened One Night (1934, the first Big Five winner at the Academy Awards), Mr. Deeds Goes to Town (1936) and You Can't Take It with You (1938).

In 1932, the Venice Film Festival, the world's oldest film festival and one of the "Big Three" film festivals, alongside the Cannes Film Festival and the Berlin International Film Festival, was established.

==== Cinecittà (1930s–present) ====
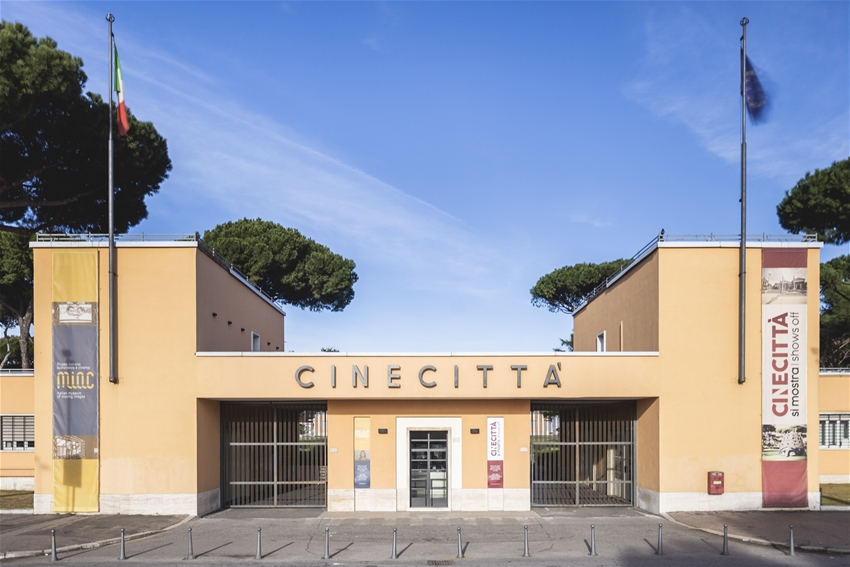
Entrance to the Cinecittà in Rome, the largest film studio in Europe

In 1934, the Italian government created the General Directorate for Cinema (Direzione Generale per le Cinematografia), and appointed Luigi Freddi its director. With the approval of Benito Mussolini, this directorate called for the establishment of a town southeast of Rome devoted exclusively to cinema, dubbed the Cinecittà ("Cinema City"), under the slogan "Il cinema è l'arma più forte" ("Cinema is the most powerful weapon"). The studios were constructed during the Fascist era as part of a plan to revive the Italian film industry, which had reached its low point in 1931.

Mussolini himself inaugurated the studios on 21 April 1937. Post-production units and sets were constructed and heavily used initially. Early films such as Scipio Africanus (1937) and The Iron Crown (1941) showcased the technological advancement of the studios. Seven thousand people were involved in the filming of the battle scene from Scipio Africanus, and live elephants were brought in as a part of the re-enactment of the Battle of Zama.

The Cinecittà provided everything necessary for filmmaking: theatres, technical services, and even a cinematography school, the Centro Sperimentale di Cinematografia, for younger apprentices. The Cinecittà studios were Europe's most advanced production facilities and greatly boosted the technical quality of Italian films. Many films are still shot entirely in Cinecittà. Benito Mussolini founded Cinecittà studio also for the production of Fascist propaganda until World War II.

During this period, Mussolini's son, Vittorio, created a national production company and organized the work of noted authors, directors and actors (including even some political opponents), thereby creating an interesting communication network among them, which produced several noted friendships and stimulated cultural interaction.

With an area of 400,000 square metres (99 acres), it is still the largest film studio in Europe, and is considered the hub of Italian cinema. Filmmakers such as Federico Fellini, Roberto Rossellini, Luchino Visconti, Sergio Leone, Bernardo Bertolucci, Francis Ford Coppola, Martin Scorsese, and Mel Gibson have worked at Cinecittà. More than 3,000 movies have been filmed there, of which 90 received an Academy Award nomination and 47 of these won it.

==== Telefoni Bianchi (1930s–1940s) ====
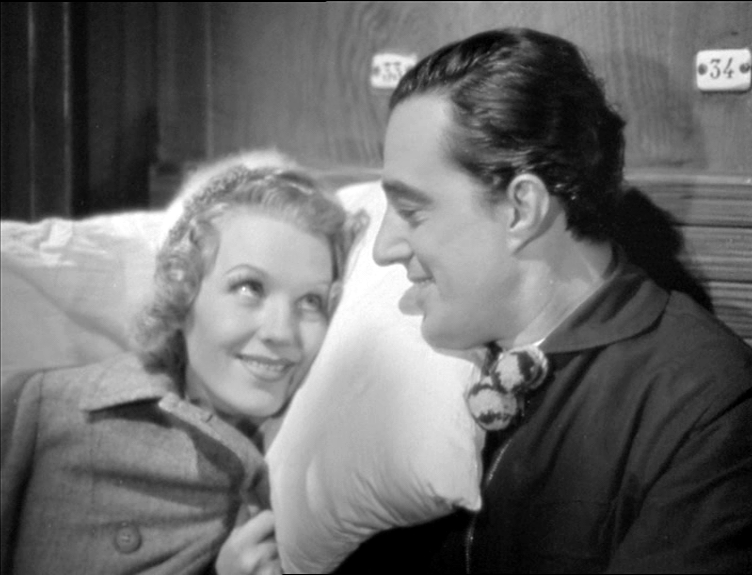
Department Store by Mario Camerini (1939)

During the 1930s, light comedies known as Telefoni Bianchi ("white telephones") were predominant in Italian cinema. These films, which featured lavish set designs, promoted conservative values and respect for authority, and thus typically avoided the scrutiny of government censors. Telefoni Bianchi proved to be the testing ground of numerous screenwriters destined to impose themselves in the following decades (including Cesare Zavattini and Sergio Amidei), and above all of numerous set designers such as Guido Fiorini, Gino Carlo Sensani and Antonio Valente, who, by virtue, successful graphic inventions led these productions to become a kind of "summa" of the petty-bourgeois aesthetics of the time.

The first film of the genre Telefoni Bianchi was The Private Secretary (1931), by Goffredo Alessandrini. Among the authors, Mario Camerini is the most representative director of the genre. After having practiced the most diverse trends in the 1930s, he happily moved into the territory of sentimental comedy with What Scoundrels Men Are! (1932), Il signor Max (1937) and Department Store (1939). In other films, he compares himself with the Hollywood-style comedy on the model of Frank Capra (Heartbeat, 1939) and the surreal one of René Clair (I'll Give a Million, 1936). Camerini is interested in the figure of the typical and popular Italian, so much so that he anticipates some elements of the future Italian comedy. His major interpreter, Vittorio De Sica, will continue his lesson in Maddalena, Zero for Conduct (1940) and Teresa Venerdì (1941), emphasizing above all the direction of the actors and the care for the settings.

Other directors include Mario Mattoli (Schoolgirl Diary, 1941), Jean de Limur (Apparition, 1944) and Max Neufeld (The House of Shame, 1938; A Thousand Lire a Month, 1939). The realist comedies of Mario Bonnard (Before the Postman, 1942; The Peddler and the Lady, 1943) are partially different in character, which partially deviate from the imprint of Telefoni Bianchi.

==== Fascist propaganda (1930s–1940s) ====
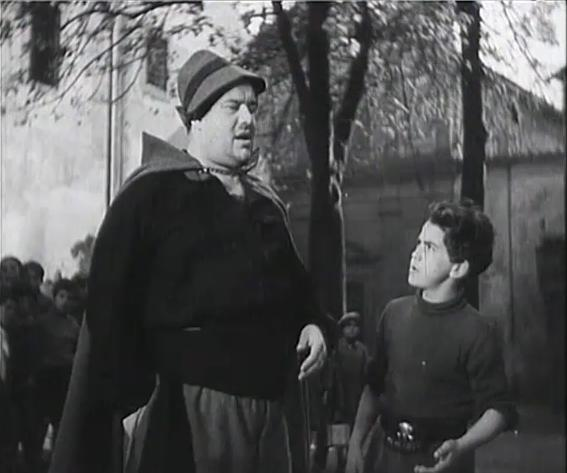
The Old Guard by Alessandro Blasetti (1934)

In the fascist propaganda cinema, at the beginning, the representations of the squads and the first fascist actions were rare. The Old Guard (1934), by Alessandro Blasetti evokes the supposed vitalistic spontaneity of squads with populist tones, but is not appreciated by official critics. Black Shirt (1933), by Giovacchino Forzano, made for the 10th anniversary of the March on Rome, celebrated the regime's policies (the reclamation of the Pontine marshes and the construction of Littoria) alternating narrative sequences with documentary passages.

With political consolidation, the government authority required the film industry to strengthen the regime's identification with the country's history and culture. Hence the intention to reread Italian history in an authoritarian perspective, teleologically reducing every past event to a harbinger of the "fascist revolution", in continuity with the historiographical work of Gioacchino Volpe. After the first attempts in this direction, aimed above all at underlining the alleged link between the Risorgimento and Fascism (Villafranca by Forzano, 1933; 1860 by Blasetti, 1933), the trend reached its peak just before the war. Cavalry (1936), by Goffredo Alessandrini, evokes the nobility of the Savoy fighters by presenting their deeds as anticipations of squads. Condottieri (1937) by Luis Trenker, tells the story of Giovanni delle Bande Nere, explicitly establishing a parallel with Benito Mussolini, while Scipio Africanus: The Defeat of Hannibal (1937) by Carmine Gallone (one of the greatest financial efforts of the time), it celebrates the Roman Empire and indirectly the Fascist Empire.

The invasion of Ethiopia gives Italian directors the opportunity to extend the horizons of the settings. The Great Appeal (1936) by Mario Camerini, exalts imperialism by describing the "new land" as an opportunity for work and redemption, contrasting the heroism of young soldiers with bourgeois fearlessness. The anti-pacifist controversy that accompanies colonial enterprises is also evident in Lo squadrone bianco (1936) by Augusto Genina, which combines propaganda rhetoric with notable battle sequences shot in the Italian Tripolitania desert. Most of the films celebrating the empire are predominantly documentaries, aimed at disguising the war as a struggle of civilization against barbarism. The Spanish Civil War is described in the documentaries Los novios de la muerte (1936) by Romolo Marcellini and Arriba España, España una, grande, libre! (1939) by Giorgio Ferroni, and is the backdrop for another dozen films, among which the most spectacular is The Siege of the Alcazar (1940) by Augusto Genina.

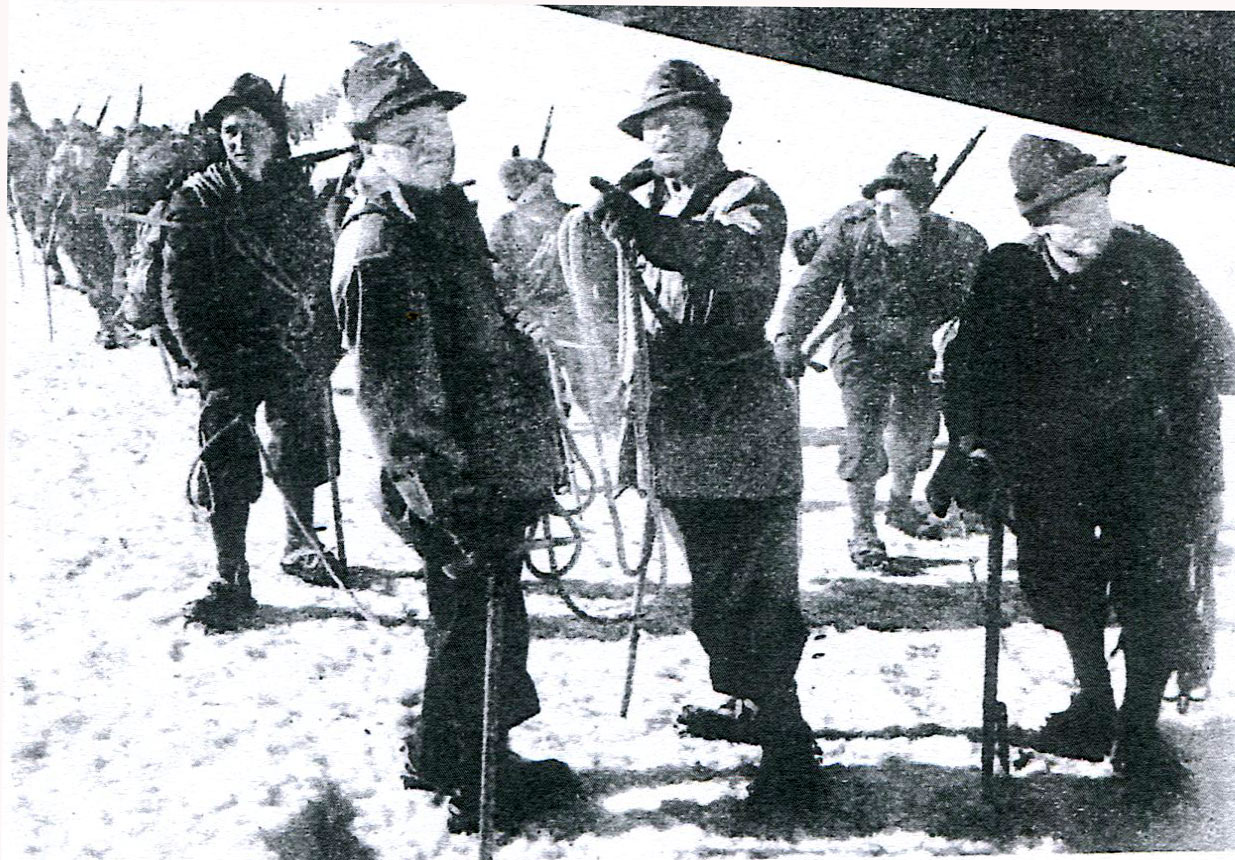
Men of the Mountain by Aldo Vergano (1943)

Films such as Pietro Micca (1938) by Aldo Vergano, Ettore Fieramosca (1938), made in the same year by Alessandro Blasetti, and Fanfulla da Lodi (1940) by Giulio Antamoro can also be counted as propaganda films (albeit indirect), in which, a pretext for the epic narration of historical events, a clear apology for dedication to the homeland (in some cases even to the point of personal sacrifice) is made in the same vein as colonial films with a contemporary setting.

With Italy's participation in World War II, the fascist regime further strengthens its control over production and requires a more decisive commitment to propaganda. In addition to the now canonical documentaries, short films and newsreels, there is also an increase in feature films in praise of Italian war enterprises. Among the most representative we find Bengasi (1942) by Genina, Gente dell'aria (1943) by Esodo Pratelli, The Three Pilots (1942) by Mario Mattoli (based on a screenplay by Vittorio Mussolini), Il treno crociato (1943) by Carlo Campogalliani, Harlem (1943) by Carmine Gallone and Men of the Mountain (1943) by Aldo Vergano under the supervision of Blasetti. Uomini sul fondo (1941) by Francesco De Robertis is also notable due to its almost documentary approach.

The most successful film of the period is We the Living (1942) by Goffredo Alessandrini, made as a single film, but then distributed in two parts due to its excessive length. Referable to the genre of anti-communist drama, this sombre melodrama (set in the Soviet Union) is inspired by the novel of the same name by the writer Ayn Rand which exalts the most radical philosophical individualism. Precisely because of this generic criticism of authoritarianism, the diptych could be interpreted as a mild accusation against the fascist regime.

Among the directors who give their contribution to the war propaganda, there is also Roberto Rossellini, author of a trilogy composed of The White Ship (1941), A Pilot Returns (1942) and The Man with a Cross (1943). Anticipating in some ways his works of maturity, the director adopted a modest and immediate style, which does not contrast the effectiveness of the propaganda but neither does it exalt the dominant war rhetoric; it was the same anti-spectacular approach to which he remained faithful throughout his life.

=== 1940s ===
==== Neorealism (1940s–1950s) ====
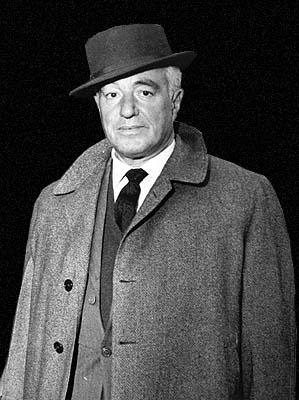
Vittorio De Sica, a leading figure in the neorealist movement and one of the world's most acclaimed and influential filmmakers of all time.

By the end of World War II, the Italian "neorealist" movement had begun to take shape. Neorealist films typically dealt with the working class (in contrast to the Telefoni Bianchi), and were shot on location. Many neorealist films, but not all, used non-professional actors. Though the term "neorealism" was used for the first time to describe Luchino Visconti’s 1943 film, Ossessione, there were several important precursors to the movement, most notably Camerini's What Scoundrels Men Are! (1932), which was the first Italian film shot entirely on location, and Blasetti's 1942 film, Four Steps in the Clouds.

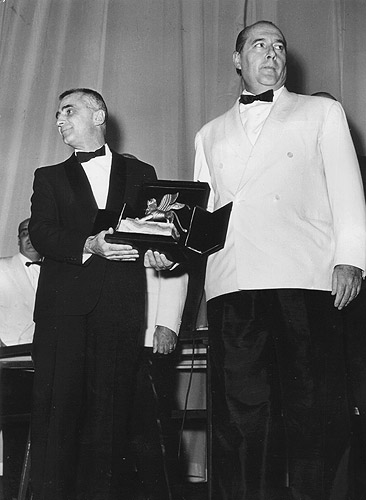
Roberto Rossellini and Mario Monicelli winning the Golden Lion for General Della Rovere and The Great War respectively.

Ossessione angered Fascist officials. Upon viewing the film, Vittorio Mussolini is reported to have shouted, "This is not Italy!" before walking out of the theatre. The film was subsequently banned in the Fascist-controlled parts of Italy. While neorealism exploded after the war and was incredibly influential at the international level, neorealist films made up only a small percentage of Italian films produced during this period, as postwar Italian moviegoers preferred escapist comedies starring actors such as Totò and Alberto Sordi.

Neorealist works such as Roberto Rossellini's trilogy Rome, Open City (1945), Paisà (1946), and Germany, Year Zero (1948), with professional actors such as Anna Magnani and a number of non-professional actors, attempted to describe the difficult economic and moral conditions of postwar Italy and the changes in public mentality in everyday life. Visconti's The Earth Trembles (1948) was shot on location in a Sicilian fishing village and used local non-professional actors. Giuseppe De Santis, on other hand, used actors such as Silvana Mangano and Vittorio Gassman in his 1949 film, Bitter Rice, which is set in the Po Valley during rice-harvesting season.

Poetry and cruelty of life were harmonically combined in the works that Vittorio De Sica wrote and directed together with screenwriter Cesare Zavattini: among them, Shoeshine (1946), The Bicycle Thief (1948) and Miracle in Milan (1951). The 1952 film Umberto D. showed a poor old man with his little dog, who must beg for alms against his dignity in the loneliness of the new society. This work is perhaps De Sica's masterpiece and one of the most important works in Italian cinema. It was not a commercial success and since then it has been shown on Italian television only a few times. The film embodies both a conservative and a progressive view.

Although Umberto D. is considered the end of the neorealist period, later films such as Federico Fellini's La Strada (1954) and De Sica's 1960 film Two Women (for which Sophia Loren won the Oscar for Best Actress) are grouped with the genre. Director Pier Paolo Pasolini's first film, Accattone (1961), shows a strong neorealist influence. Italian neorealist cinema influenced filmmakers around the world, and helped inspire other film movements, such as the French New Wave and the Polish Film School. The Neorealist period is often simply referred to as "The Golden Age" of Italian cinema by critics, filmmakers, and scholars.

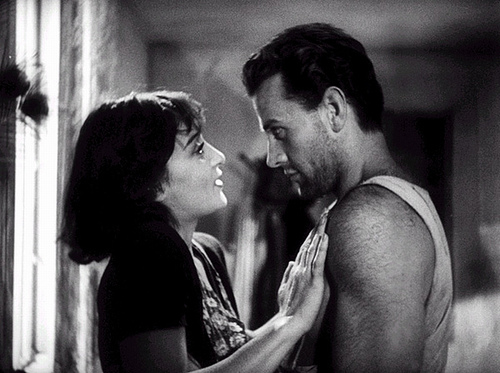
Ossessione (1943), by Luchino Visconti.

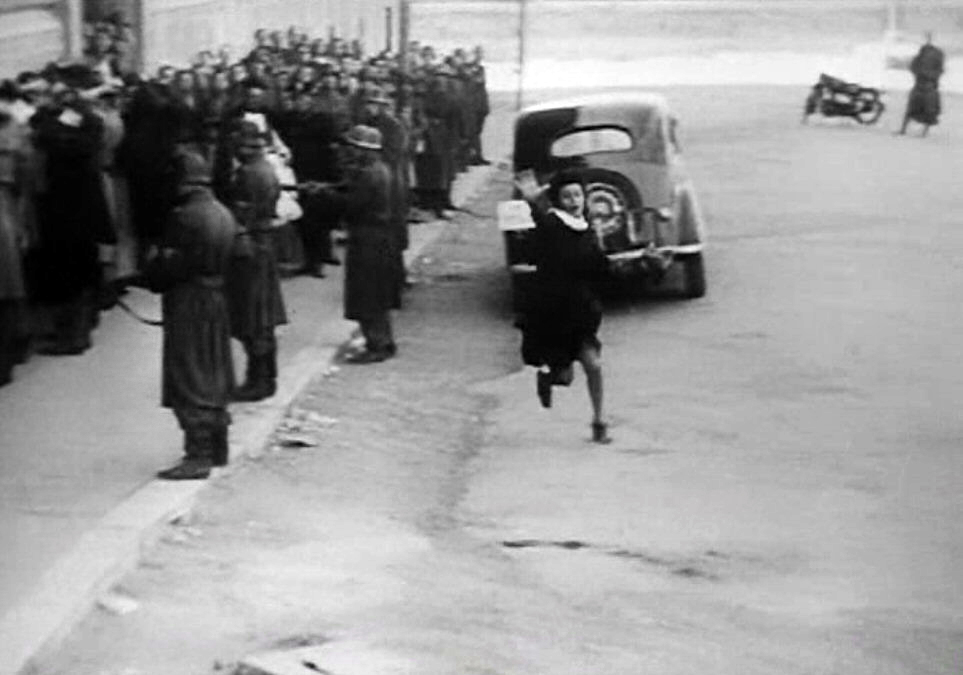
A still shot from Rome, Open City (1945), by Roberto Rossellini.

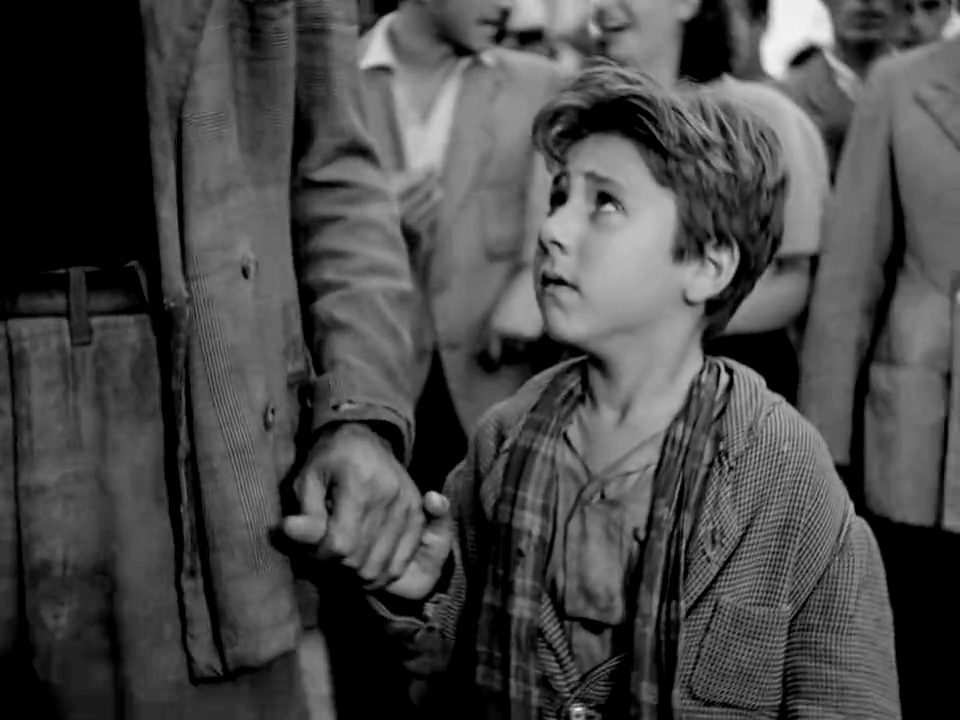
Bicycle Thieves (1948), by Vittorio De Sica, ranked among the best movies ever made and part of the canon of classic cinema.

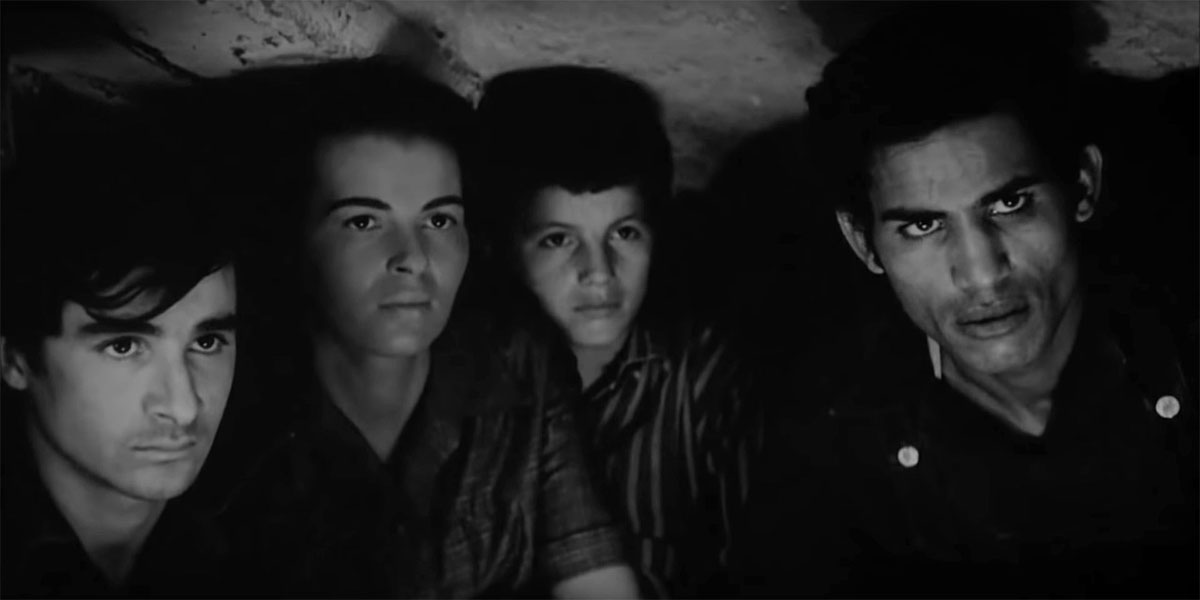
Gillo Pontecorvo's The Battle of Algiers (1966) is often associated with Italian neorealism.

==== Calligrafismo (1940s) ====
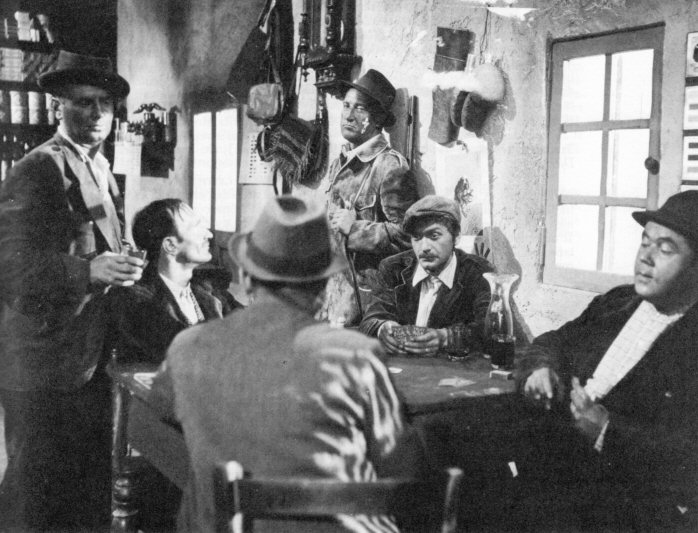
Tragic Night by Mario Soldati (1942)

Calligrafismo is in sharp contrast to Telefoni Bianchi-American style comedies and is rather artistic, highly formalistic, expressive in complexity and deals mainly with contemporary literary material, above all the pieces of Italian realism from authors like Corrado Alvaro, Ennio Flaiano, Emilio Cecchi, Francesco Pasinetti, Vitaliano Brancati, Mario Bonfantini and Umberto Barbaro.

The best-known exponent of this genre is Mario Soldati, a long-time writer and director destined to establish himself with films of literary ancestry and solid formal structure. His films put at the centre of the story characters endowed with a dramatic and psychological strength foreign to both white-phone cinema and propaganda films, and found in works such as Dora Nelson (1939), Piccolo mondo antico (1941), Tragic Night (1942), Malombra (1942) and In High Places (1943). Luigi Chiarini, already active as a critic, deepens the trend in his Sleeping Beauty (1942), Street of the Five Moons (1942) and The Innkeeper (1944). The internal conflicts of the characters and the scenographic richness are also recurrent in the first films by Alberto Lattuada (Giacomo the Idealist, 1943) and Renato Castellani (A Pistol Shot, 1942), dominated by a sense of moral and cultural decay that seems to anticipate the end of the war.

Another important example of a calligraphic film is the film version of The Betrothed (1941), by Mario Camerini (very faithful in the staging of Manzoni's masterpiece), which due to the perceived income, became the most popular feature film between 1941 and 1942.

==== Animation (1940s–present) ====
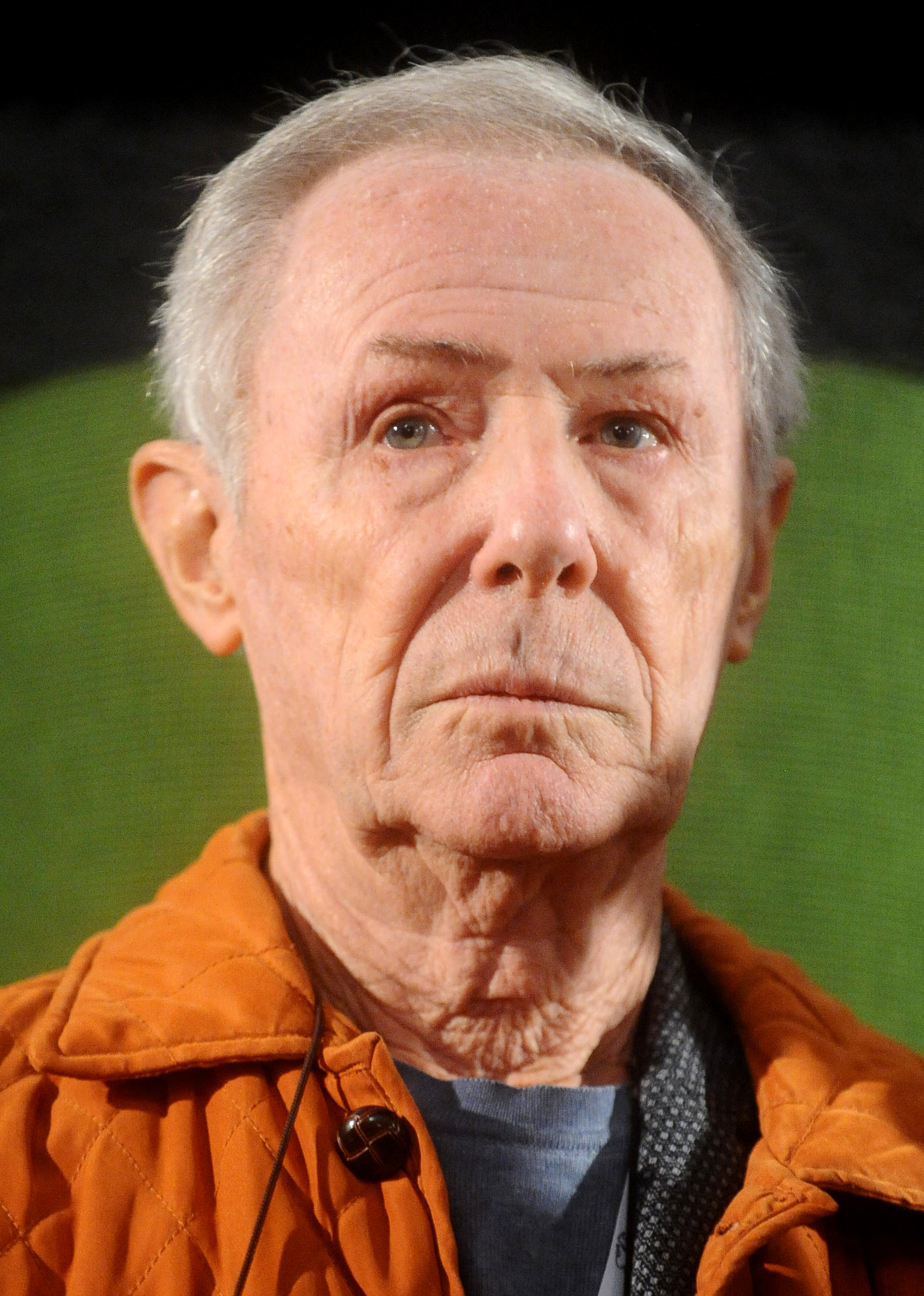
Bruno Bozzetto

The pioneer of the Italian cartoon was Francesco Guido, better known as Gibba. Immediately after the end of World War II, he produced the first animated medium-length film of Italian cinema entitled L'ultimo sciuscià (1946), which took up themes typical of neorealism and in the following decade the feature films Rompicollo and I picchiatelli, in collaboration with Antonio Attanasi. In the 1970s, after many animated documentaries, Gibba himself will return to the feature film with the erotic Il nano e la strega (1973) and Il racconto della giungla (1974). Also interesting are the contributions of the painter and set designer Emanuele Luzzati who, after some valuable short films, made in 1976 one of the masterpieces of Italian animation: Il flauto magico ("The Magic Flute"), based on the homonymous opera by Mozart.

In 1949, the designer Nino Pagot presented The Dynamite Brothers at the Venice Film Festival, one of the first animated feature films of the time, released in theatres in conjunction with La Rosa di Bagdad (1949), made by the animator Anton Gino Domeneghini. In the early 1950s, the cartoonist Romano Scarpa created the short film La piccola fiammiferaia (1953), which remains, like the two previous films, little more than an isolated case. Apart from these examples, Italian animation in the 1950s and 1960s failed to become a major reality and remains confined to the television sector, due to the various commissions provided by the Carosello container.

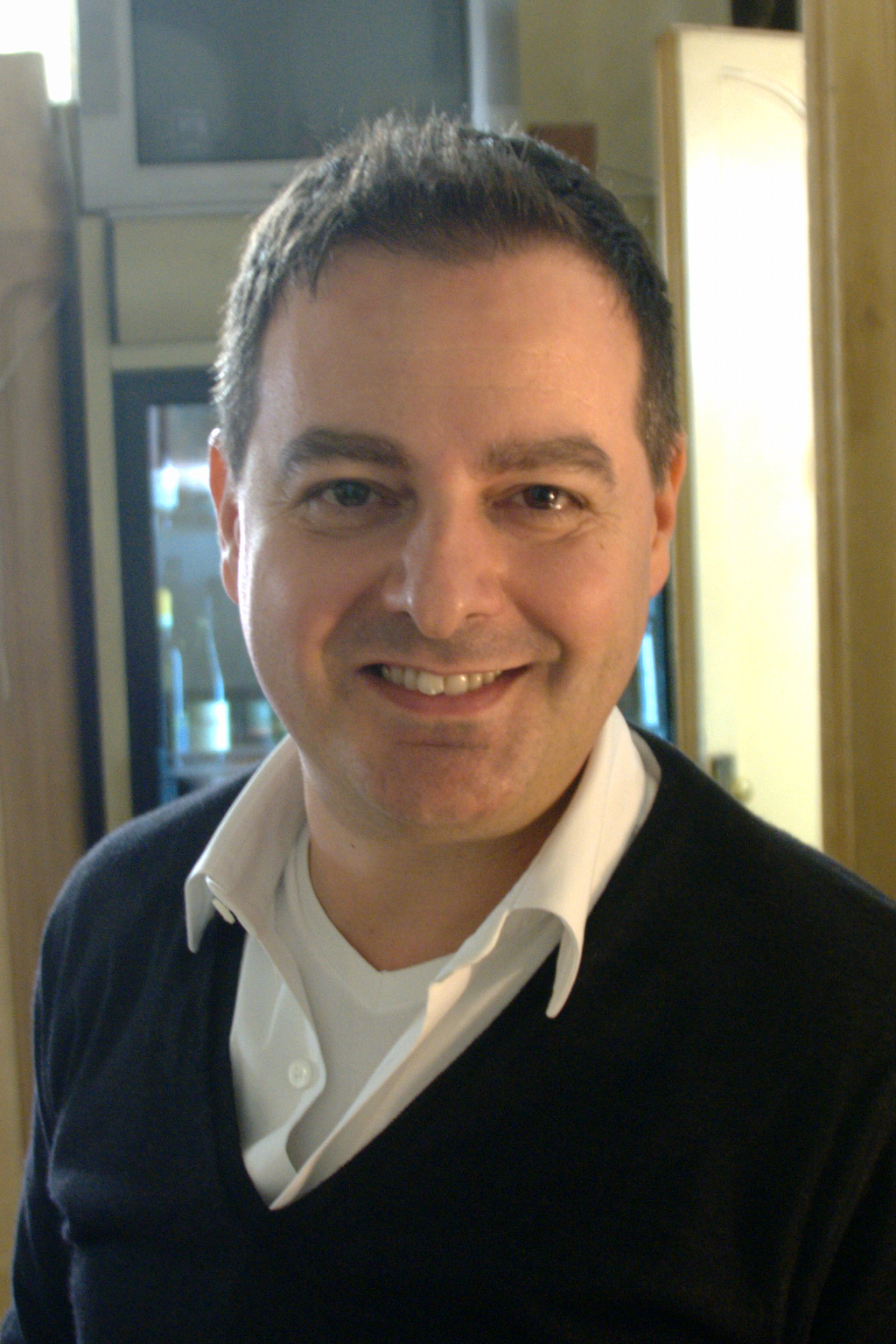
Iginio Straffi

But it is with Bruno Bozzetto that the Italian cartoon reaches an international dimension: his debut feature film West and Soda (1965), an irresistible caricature of the Western genre, received acclaim from both audiences and critics. A few years later his second work entitled VIP my Brother Superman was released, distributed in 1968. After many satirical short films (centred on the popular figure of "Signor Rossi") he returned to the feature film with what is considered his most ambitious work, Allegro Non Troppo (1977). Inspired by the well-known Disney Fantasia, it is a mixed media film, in which animated episodes are molded to the notes of many classical music pieces. Another illustrator to underline is the artist Pino Zac who in 1971 shot (again with mixed technique) The Nonexistent Knight, based on the novel of the same name by Italo Calvino.

In the 1990s, Italian animation entered a new phase of production due to the Turin Lanterna Magica studio which in 1996, under the direction of Enzo D'Alò, created the intriguing Christmas fairy tale How the Toys Saved Christmas, based on a short story by Gianni Rodari. The film was a success and paved the way for other feature films. In fact, in 1998, Lucky and Zorba based on a novel by Luis Sepúlveda was distributed, which attracted the favour of the public, reaching a new apex in the Italian animated cinema.

The director Enzo d'Alò, who separated from the Lanterna Magica studio, produced other films in the following years such as Momo (2001) and Opopomoz (2003). The Turin studio distributed on its behalf the films Aida of the Trees (2001) and Totò Sapore e la magica storia della pizza (2003), accompanied by a good response at the box office. In 2003, the first entirely Italian animated film in computer graphics was released entitled L'apetta Giulia and Signora Vita, directed by Paolo Modugno. To underline the work La Storia di Leo (2007) by director Mario Cambi, winner, the following year, at the Giffoni Film Festival.

In 2010, the first Italian animated film in 3D technology was made, directed by Iginio Straffi, entitled Winx Club 3D: Magical Adventure, based on the homonymous series; in the meantime Enzo D'Alò returns to theatres, presenting his Pinocchio (2012). In 2012, the film Gladiators of Rome, also shot in 3D technology, received credit from the public, followed by the feature film Winx Club: The Mystery of the Abyss (2014), both again by Iginio Straffi. Finally, The Art of Happiness (2013) by Alessandro Rak, a film made in Naples by 40 authors, including only 10 designers and animators from the Mad Entertainment studio, a true absolute record for an animated film was made. Cinderella the Cat (2017), taken from the text Pentamerone by Giambattista Basile, came out of the same studio. The work won two David di Donatello's, one of which was for special effects, becoming the first animated film to be nominated, and win, in this category.

=== 1950s ===
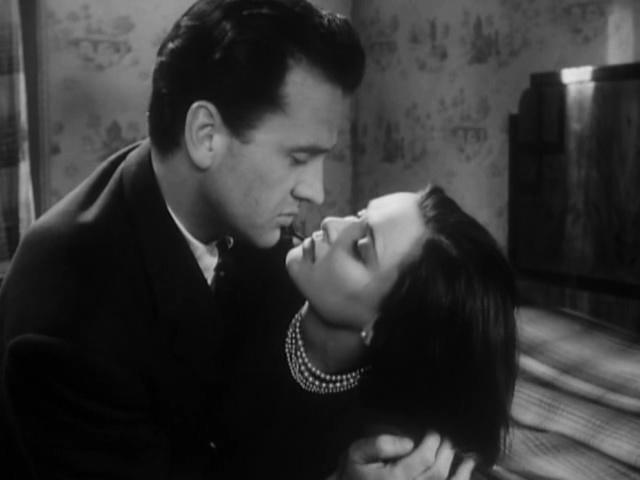
Massimo Girotti e Lucia Bosè in Story of a Love Affair by Michelangelo Antonioni (1950)

Starting from the mid-1950s, Italian cinema primarily explored existential topics and included a wider variety of different styles and points of view, often more introspective than descriptive.

Michelangelo Antonioni was one of the most influential film makers of this era, including Story of a Love Affair (1950), I Vinti (1952), The Lady Without Camelias (1953) and Le Amiche (1955). Many of his workers focused upon the lives of the Italian upper class. In 1957, he staged the proletarian drama Il Grido, with which he obtained critical acclaim.

In 1955, the David di Donatello was established, with its Best Picture category being awarded for the first time in 1970. Named after Donatello's David, a symbolic statue of the Italian Renaissance, They are film awards given out each year by the Accademia del Cinema Italiano (The Academy of Italian Cinema).

==== Federico Fellini (1950s–1990s) ====
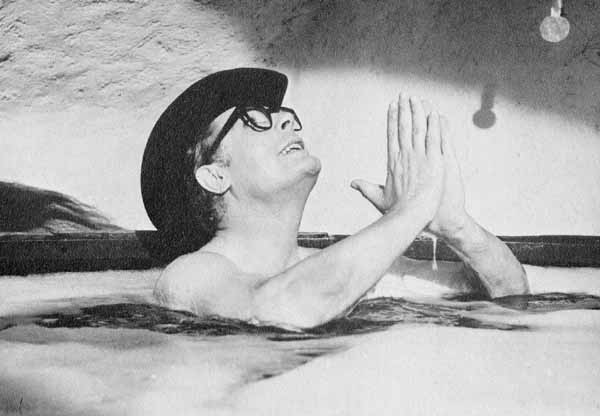
Marcello Mastroianni in 8½ (1963) by Federico Fellini, considered to be one of the greatest films of all time

Federico Fellini is recognized as one of the greatest and most influential filmmakers of all time. Fellini won the Palme d'Or for La Dolce Vita, was nominated for twelve Academy Awards, and won four in the category of Best Foreign Language Film, the most for any director in the history of the academy. He received an honorary award for Lifetime Achievement at the 65th Academy Awards in Los Angeles. His other well-known films include La Strada (1954), Nights of Cabiria (1957), Juliet of the Spirits (1967), Satyricon (1969), Roma (1972), Amarcord (1973), and Fellini's Casanova (1976).

Personal and highly idiosyncratic visions of society, Fellini's films are a unique combination of memory, dreams, fantasy and desire. The adjectives "Fellinian" and "Felliniesque" are "synonymous with any kind of extravagant, fanciful, even baroque image in the cinema and in art in general". La Dolce Vita contributed the term paparazzi to the English language, derived from Paparazzo, the photographer friend of journalist Marcello Rubini (Marcello Mastroianni).

Contemporary filmmakers such as Tim Burton, Terry Gilliam, Emir Kusturica, and David Lynch have cited Fellini's influence on their work.

==== Pink neorealism (1950s–1960s) ====
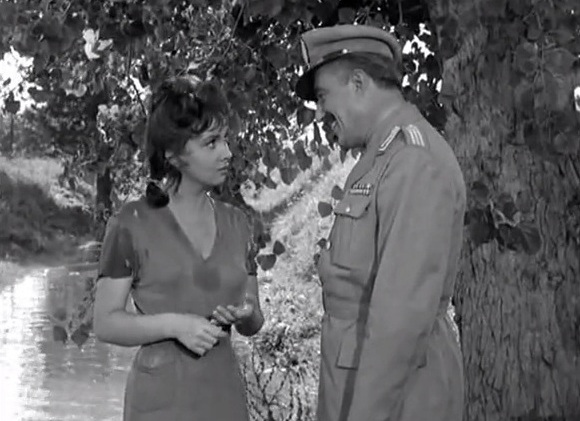
Pane, amore e fantasia by Luigi Comencini (1953)

Although Umberto D. is considered the end of the neorealist period, subsequent works turned toward lighter, sweetened and mildly optimistic atmospheres, more coherent with the improving conditions of Italy just before the economic boom; this genre became known as pink neorealism.

The precursor of pink neorealism was Renato Castellani, who helped bring realist comedy into vogue with Under the Sun of Rome (1948) and It's Forever Springtime (1949), both shot on location and with non-professional actors, and above all with public success and criticism of Two Cents Worth of Hope (1952), which laid the foundations for pink neorealism.

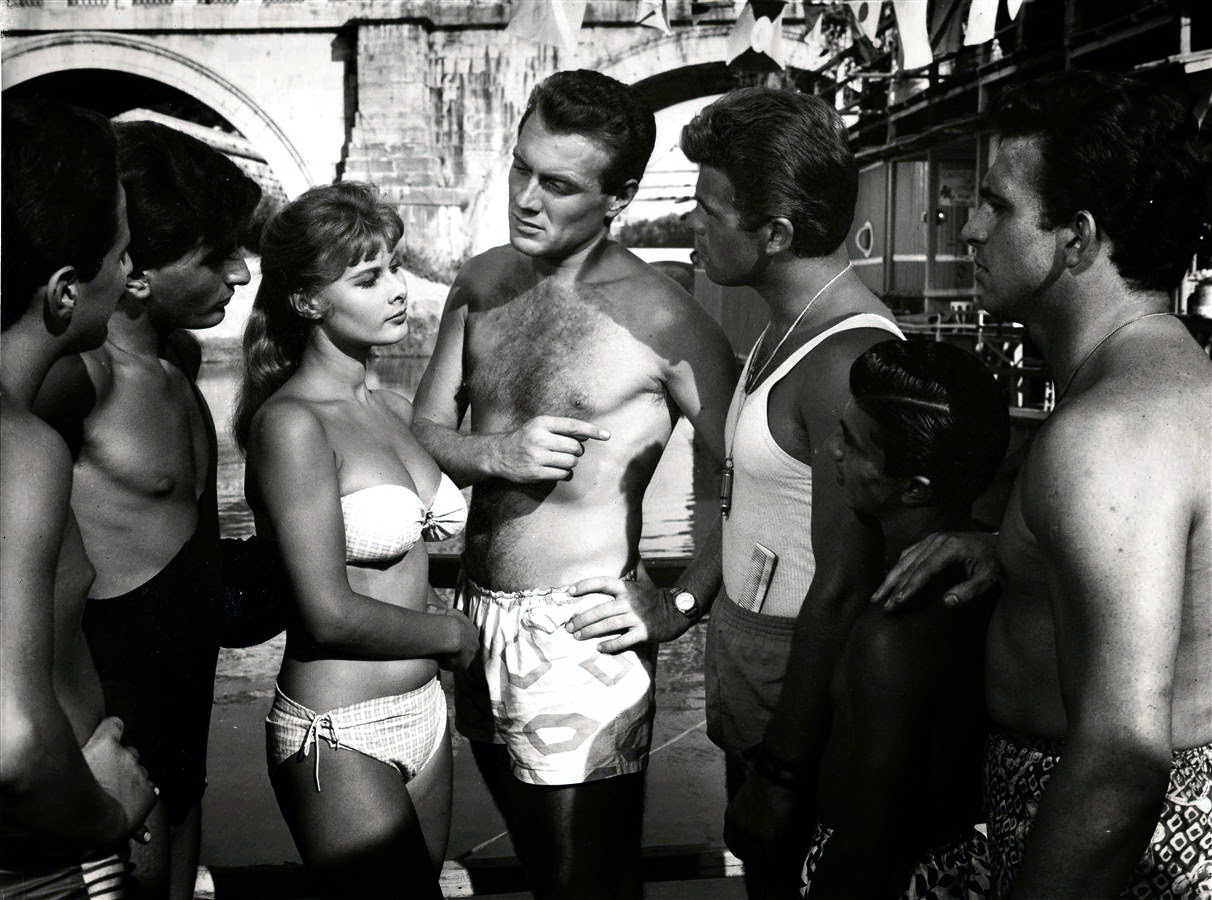
Poveri ma belli by Dino Risi (1957)

Notable films of pink neorealism, which combine popular comedy and realist motifs, are Pane, amore e fantasia (1953) by Luigi Comencini and Poveri ma belli (1957) by Dino Risi, both works are in perfect harmony with the evolution of the Italian costume. The large influx at the box office from the two films remained almost unchanged in the sequels Bread, Love and Jealousy (1954), Scandal in Sorrento (1955) and Pretty But Poor (1957), also directed by Luigi Comencini and Dino Risi.

Similarly, stories of daily life told with gentle irony (without losing sight of the social fabric) can be found in the work of the Milanese Luciano Emmer, whose films Sunday in August (1950), Three Girls from Rome (1952) and High School (1954), are the best-known examples. Another film of the pink neorealism genre was Susanna Whipped Cream (1957) by Steno.

This trend allowed some actresses to become real celebrities, such as Sophia Loren, Gina Lollobrigida, Silvana Pampanini, Lucia Bosé, Barbara Bouchet, Eleonora Rossi Drago, Silvana Mangano, Virna Lisi, Claudia Cardinale and Stefania Sandrelli. Soon pink neorealism was replaced by the Commedia all'italiana, a unique genre that, born on an ideally humouristic line, talked instead very seriously about important social themes.

==== Commedia all'Italiana (1950s–1970s) ====
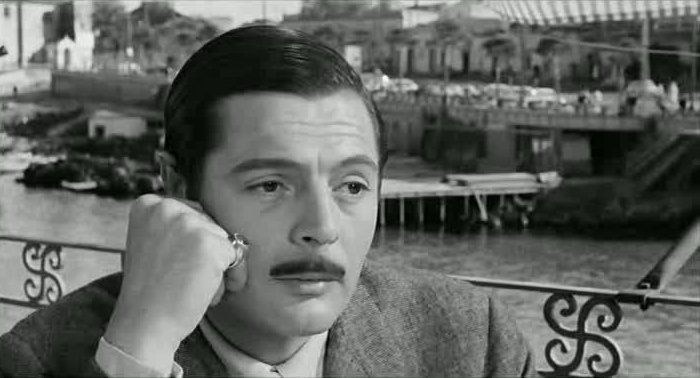
Divorce Italian Style by Pietro Germi (1961)

Commedia all'italiana ("Comedy in the Italian way") is an Italian film genre born in Italy in the 1950s and developed in the following 1960s and 1970s. It is widely considered to have started with Mario Monicelli's Big Deal on Madonna Street in 1958 and derives its name from the title of Pietro Germi's Divorce Italian Style, 1961. According to most of the critics, La Terrazza by Ettore Scola (1980) is the last work considered part of the Commedia all'italiana.

Rather than a specific genre, the term indicates a period (approximately from the late 1950s to the early 1970s) in which the Italian film industry was producing many successful comedies, with some common traits like satire of manners, farcical and grotesque overtones, a strong focus on "spicy" social issues of the period (like sexual matters, divorce, contraception, marriage of the clergy, the economic rise of the country and its various consequences, the traditional religious influence of the Catholic Church) and a prevailing middle-class setting, often characterized by a substantial background of sadness and social criticism that diluted the comic contents.

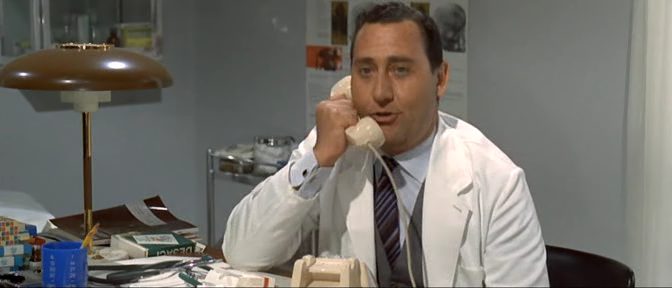
Be Sick... It's Free by Luigi Zampa (1968)

The genre of Commedia all'italiana differs markedly from the light and disengaged comedy from the so-called "pink neorealism" trend, in vogue until all of the 1950s, since, starting from the lesson of neorealism, is based on a more frank adherence in writing to reality; therefore, alongside the comic situations and plots typical of traditional comedy, always combines, with irony, a biting and sometimes bitter satire of manners, which reflects the evolution of Italian society in those years.

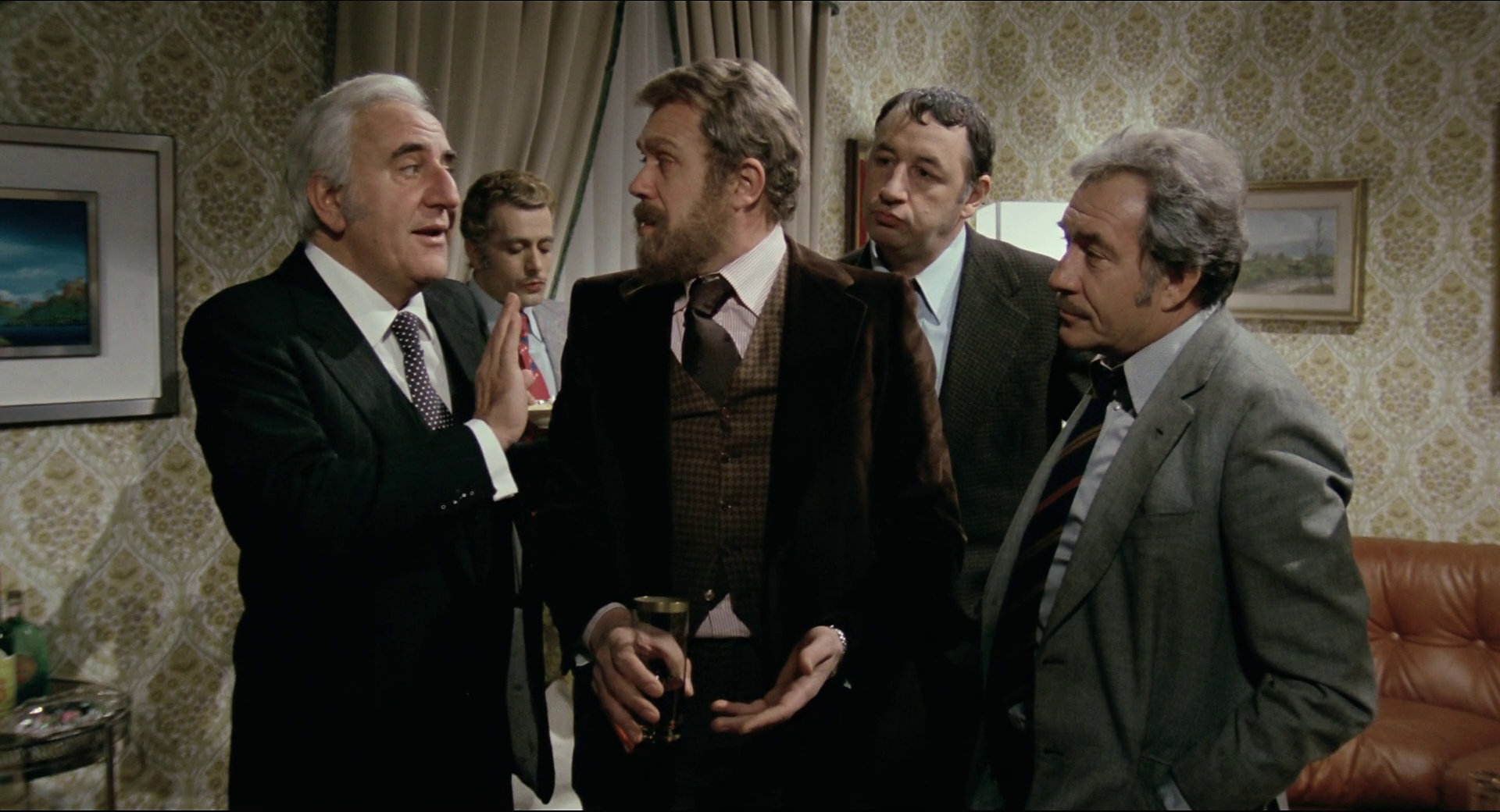
My Friends by Mario Monicelli (1975)

The success of films belonging to the "Commedia italiana" genre is due both to the presence of an entire generation of actors, who knew how to embody the vices and virtues, and the attempts at emancipation but also the vulgarities of the Italians of the time, both to the work of directors, storytellers and screenwriters, who invented a real genre, with new connotations, managing to find precious material for their cinematographic creations in the folds of a rapid evolution with contradictions.

Among the actors the main representatives are Alberto Sordi, Ugo Tognazzi, Vittorio Gassman, Marcello Mastroianni and Nino Manfredi, while among the actresses is Monica Vitti. Among directors and films, in 1961 Dino Risi directed Una vita difficile (A Difficult Life), then Il Sorpasso (The Easy Life), now a cult-movie, followed by: I Mostri (The Monsters, also known as 15 From Rome), In nome del popolo italiano (In the Name of the Italian People) and Profumo di donna (Scent of a Woman). Monicelli's works include La grande guerra (The Great War), I compagni (The Organizer), L'armata Brancaleone, Vogliamo i colonnelli (We Want the Colonels), Romanzo popolare (Come Home and Meet My Wife) and the Amici miei (My Friends) series.

For the majority of critics the true and proper "Commedia all'italiana" is to be considered definitively waned since the beginning of the 1980s, giving way, at most, to a "Commedia italiana" ("Italian comedy").

==== Totò (1950s–1960s) ====
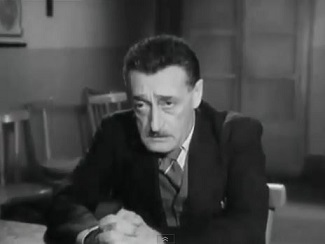
Totò in Toto and the King of Rome by Mario Monicelli and Steno (1952)

At this time, on the more commercial side of production, the phenomenon of Totò, a Neapolitan actor who is acclaimed as the major Italian comic, exploded. His films (often with Aldo Fabrizi, Peppino De Filippo and almost always with Mario Castellani) expressed a sort of neorealistic satire, in the means of a guitto (a "hammy" actor) as well as with the art of the great dramatic actor he also was. Totò is one of the symbols of the cinema of Naples.

A "film-machine" who produced dozens of titles per year, his repertoire was frequently repeated. His personal story (a prince born in the poorest rione (section of the city) of Naples), his twisted face, his mimic expressions and his gestures created a personage and made him one of the most popular Italians of the 1960s.

Some of his best-known films are Fear and Sand by Mario Mattoli, Toto Tours Italy by Mario Mattoli, Toto the Sheik by Mario Mattoli, Cops and Robbers by Mario Monicelli, Toto and the Women by Mario Monicelli, Totò Tarzan by Mario Mattoli, Toto the Third Man by Mario Mattoli, Toto and the King of Rome by Mario Monicelli and Steno, Toto in Color by Steno (one of the first Italian colour movies, 1952, in Ferrania colour), Big Deal on Madonna Street by Mario Monicelli, Toto, Peppino, and the Hussy by Camillo Mastrocinque and The Law Is the Law by Christian-Jaque. Pier Paolo Pasolini's The Hawks and the Sparrows and the episode "Che cosa sono le nuvole" from Caprice Italian Style (the latter released after his death), showed his dramatic skills.

==== Don Camillo and Peppone (1950s–1980s) ====
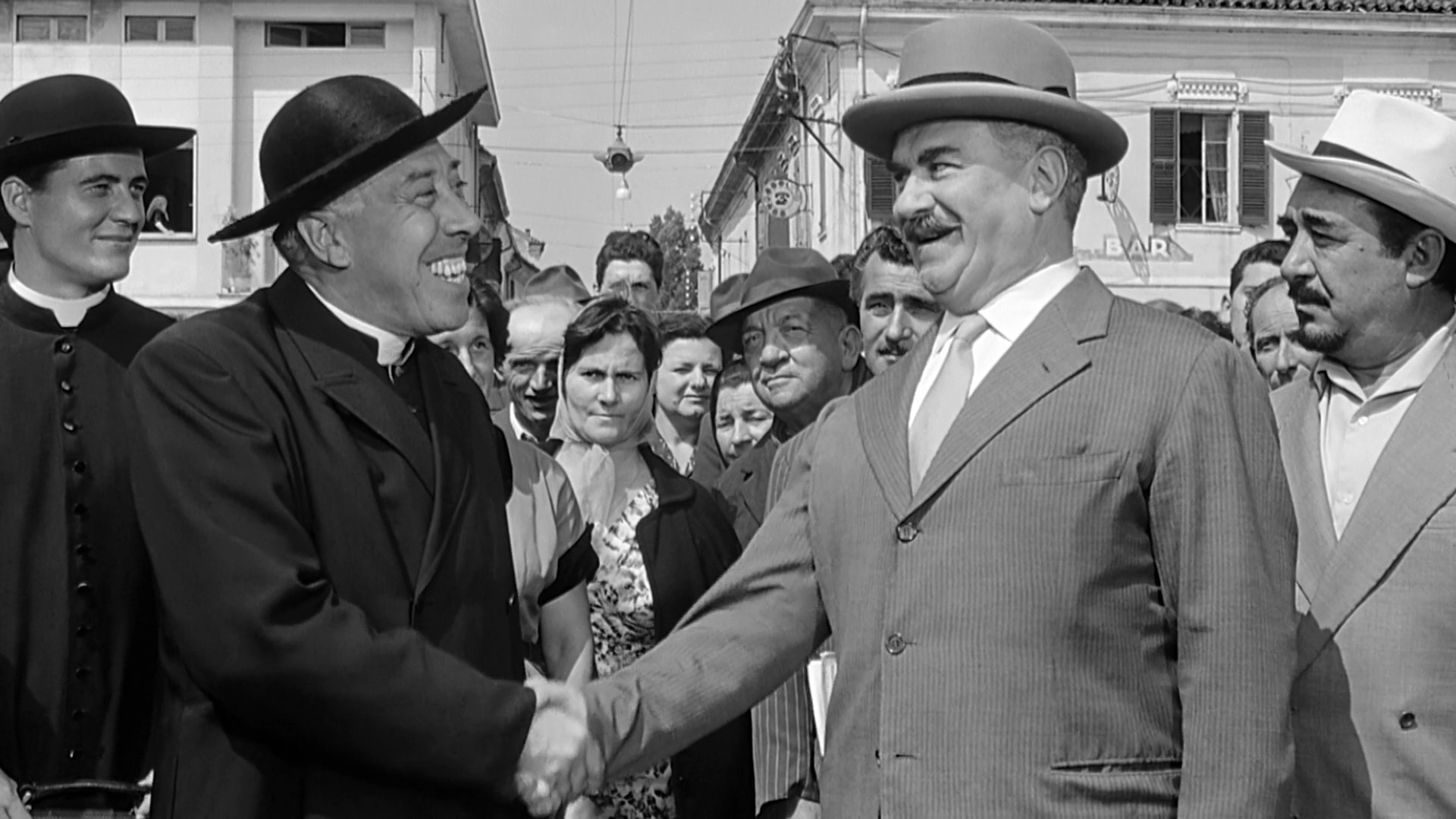
Gino Cervi and Fernandel in Don Camillo: Monsignor by Carmine Gallone (1961)

A series of black-and-white films based on Don Camillo and Peppone characters created by the Italian writer and journalist Giovannino Guareschi were made between 1952 and 1965. These were French-Italian coproductions, and starred Fernandel as the Italian priest Don Camillo and Gino Cervi as Giuseppe 'Peppone' Bottazzi, the Communist Mayor of their rural town. The titles are: The Little World of Don Camillo (1952), The Return of Don Camillo (1953), Don Camillo's Last Round (1955), Don Camillo: Monsignor (1961), and Don Camillo in Moscow (1965).

The movies were a huge commercial success in their native countries. In 1952, Little World of Don Camillo became the highest-grossing film in both Italy and France, while The Return of Don Camillo was the second most popular film of 1953 at the Italian and French box office.

Mario Camerini began filming the film Don Camillo e i giovani d'oggi, but had to stop filming due to Fernandel's falling ill, which resulted in his untimely death. The film was then realized in 1972 with Gastone Moschin playing the role of Don Camillo and Lionel Stander as Peppone.

A new Don Camillo film, titled The World of Don Camillo, was also remade in 1983, an Italian production with Terence Hill directing and also starring as Don Camillo. Colin Blakely performed Peppone in one of his last film roles.

==== Hollywood on the Tiber (1950s–1960s) ====
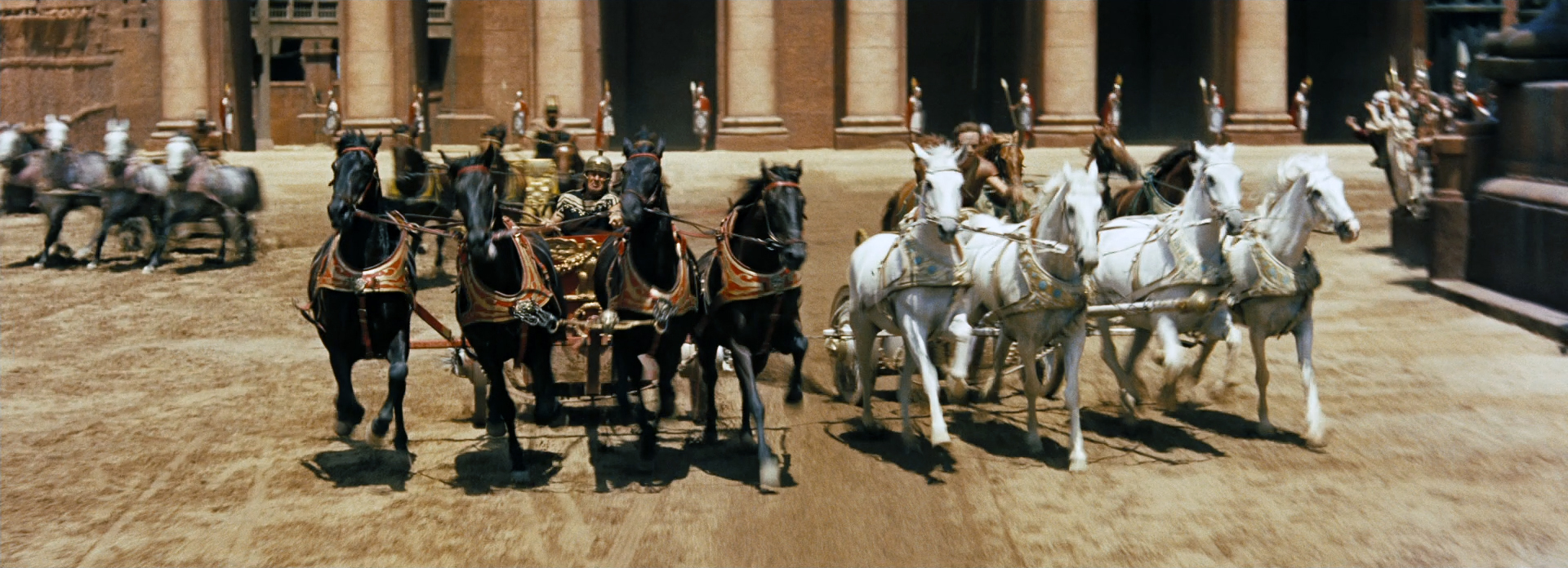
American film Ben-Hur by William Wyler (1959) was shot at the Cinecittà studios and on location around Rome during the "Hollywood on the Tiber" era.

Hollywood on the Tiber is a phrase used to describe the period in the 1950s and 1960s when the Italian capital of Rome emerged as a major location for international filmmaking attracting many foreign productions to the Cinecittà studios, the largest film studio in Europe. By contrast to the native Italian film industry, these movies were made in English for global release. Although the primary markets for such films were American and British audiences, they enjoyed widespread popularity in other countries, including Italy.

In the late 1940s, Hollywood studios began to shift production abroad to Europe. Italy was, along with Britain, one of the major destinations for American film companies. Large-budget films shot at Cinecittà during the "Hollywood on the Tiber" era such as Quo Vadis (1951), Roman Holiday (1953), Ben-Hur (1959), and Cleopatra (1963) were made in English with international casts and sometimes, but not always, Italian settings or themes.

The heyday of what was dubbed '"Hollywood on the Tiber" was between 1950 and 1970, during which time many of the most famous names in world cinema made films in Italy. The phrase "Hollywood on Tiber", a reference to the river that runs through Rome, was coined in 1950 by Time magazine during the making of Quo Vadis.

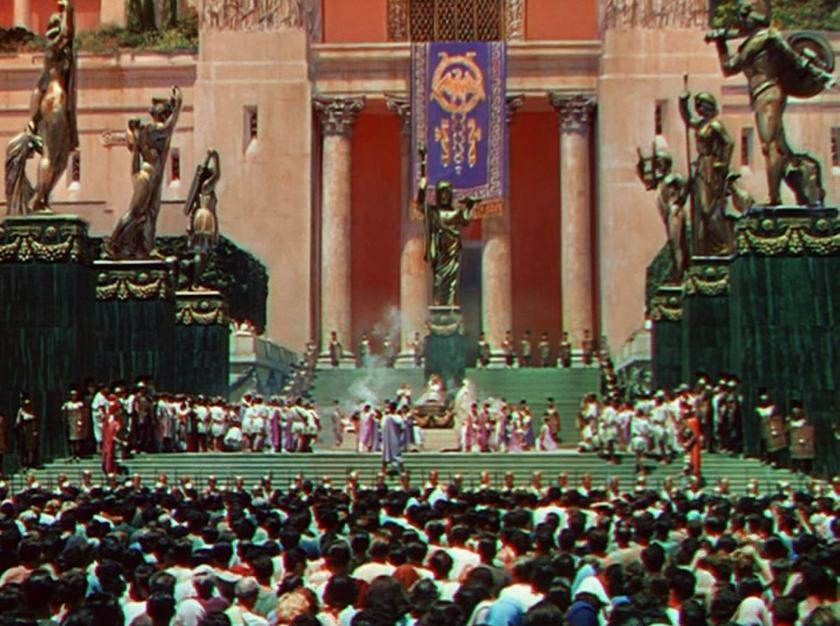
Quo Vadis by Mervyn LeRoy (1951)

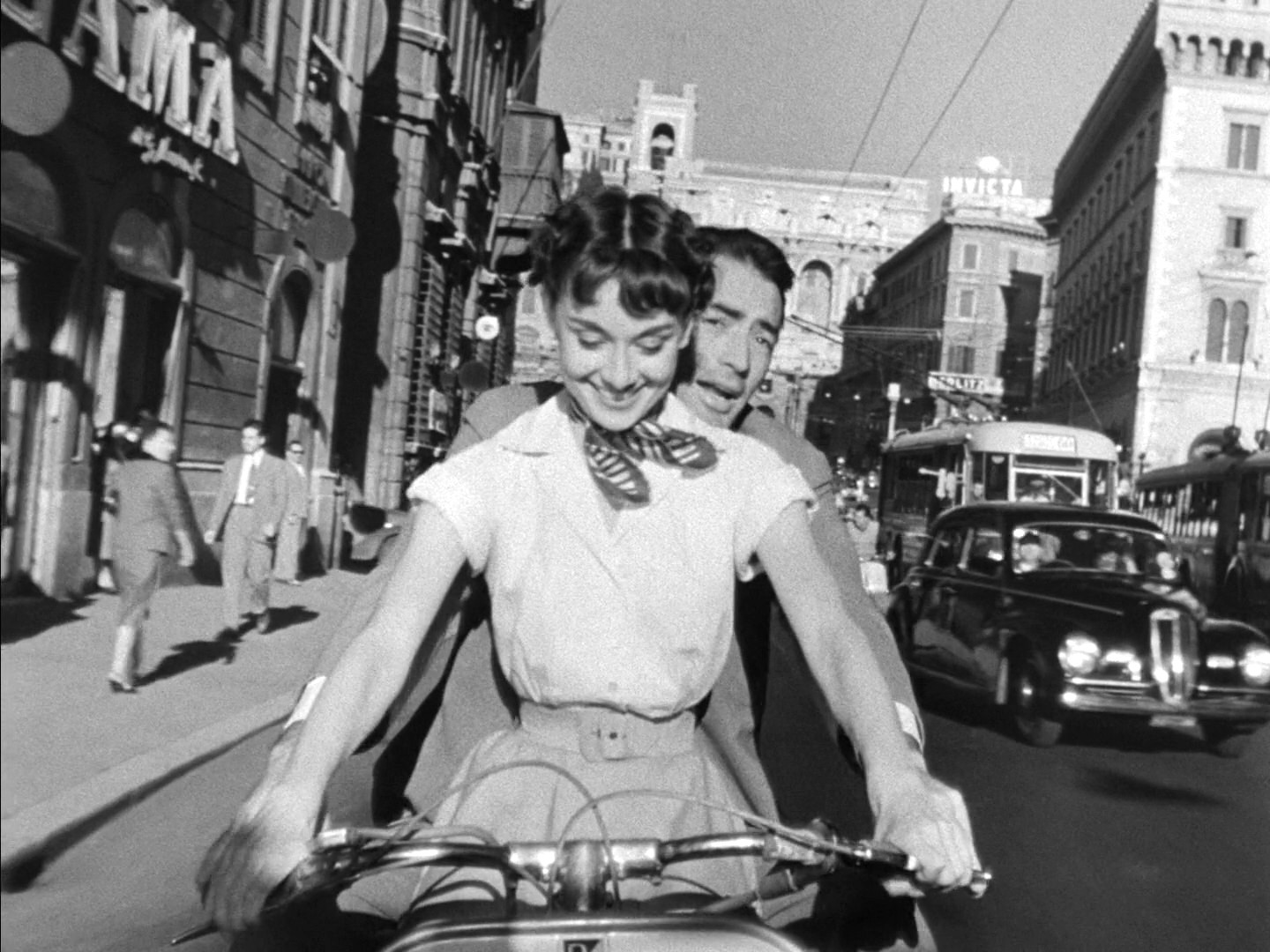
Gregory Peck and Audrey Hepburn in Roman Holiday by William Wyler (1953)

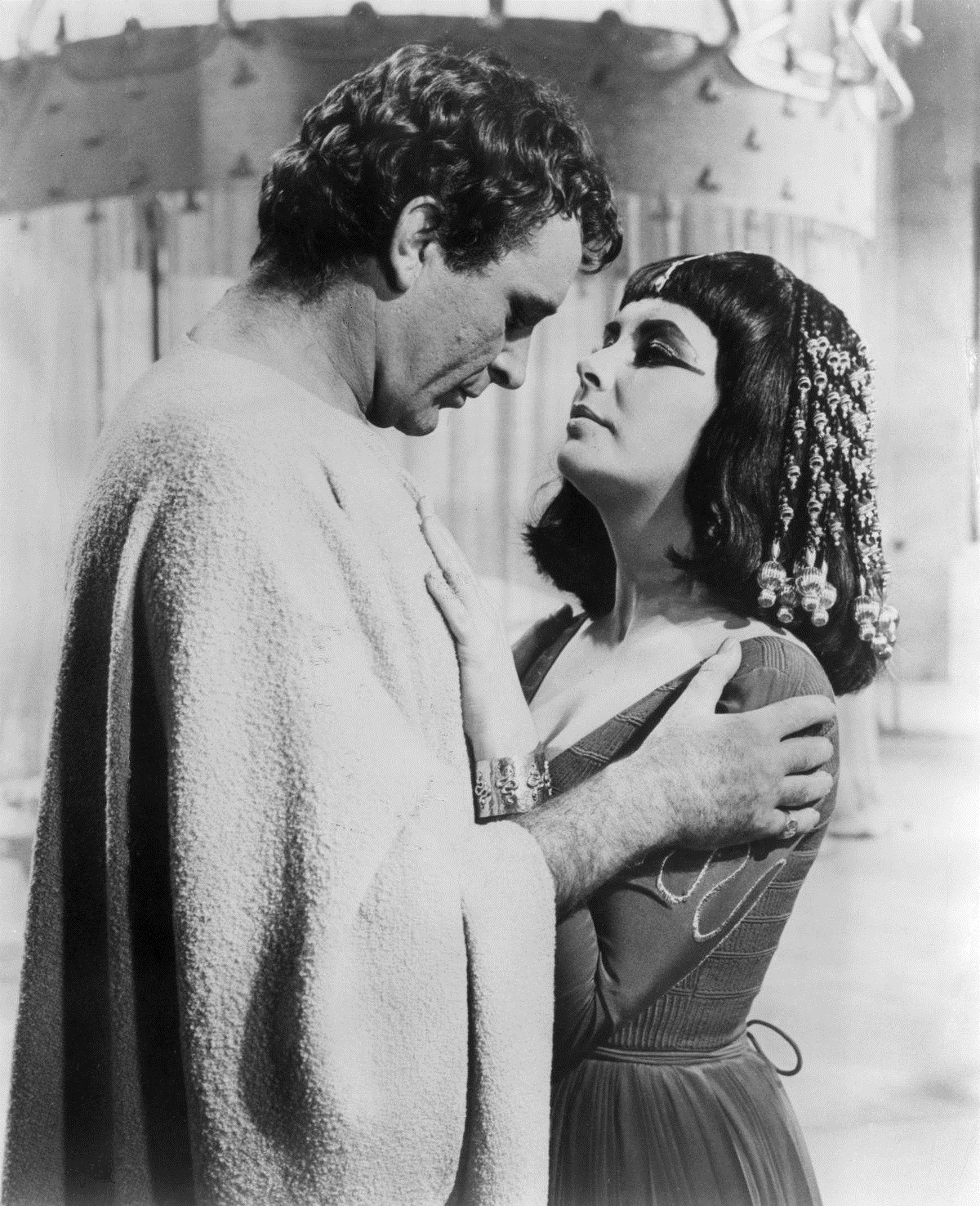
Richard Burton and Elizabeth Taylor in Cleopatra by Joseph L. Mankiewicz (1963)

==== Sword-and-sandal (a.k.a. Peplum) (1950s–1960s) ====
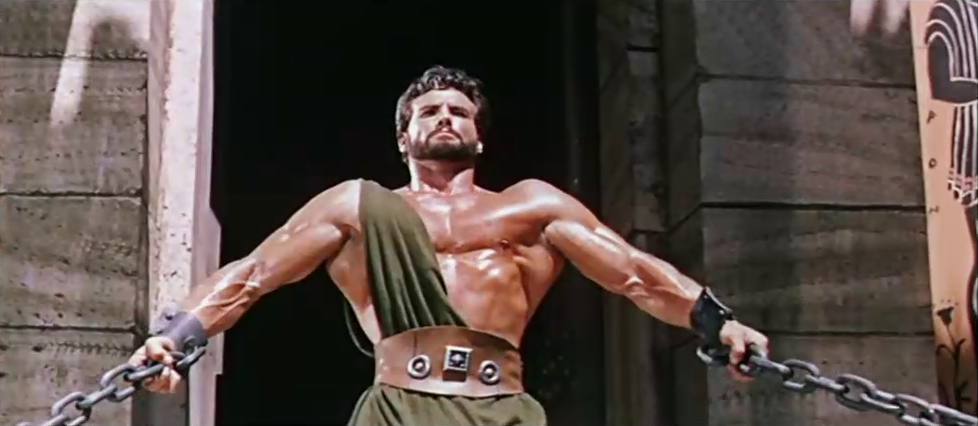
Hercules by Pietro Francisci (1958)

Sword-and-sandal, also known as peplum (pepla plural), is a subgenre of largely Italian-made historical, mythological, or Biblical epics mostly set in the Greco-Roman antiquity or the Middle Ages. These films attempted to emulate the big-budget Hollywood historical epics of the time.

With the release of 1958's Hercules, starring American bodybuilder Steve Reeves, the Italian film industry gained entree to the American film market. These films were low-budget costume/adventure dramas, and had immediate appeal with both European and American audiences. Besides the many films starring a variety of muscle men as Hercules, heroes such as Samson and Italian fictional hero Maciste were common.

Sometimes dismissed as low-quality escapist fare, the sword-and-sandal allowed newer directors such as Sergio Leone and Mario Bava a means of breaking into the film industry. Some, such as Mario Bava's Hercules in the Haunted World (Italian: Ercole Al Centro Della Terra) are considered seminal works in their own right.

As the genre matured, budgets sometimes increased, as evidenced in 1962's I sette gladiatori (The Seven Gladiators in 1964 US release), a wide-screen epic with impressive sets and matte-painting work. Most sword-and-sandal films were in colour, whereas previous Italian efforts had often been black and white.

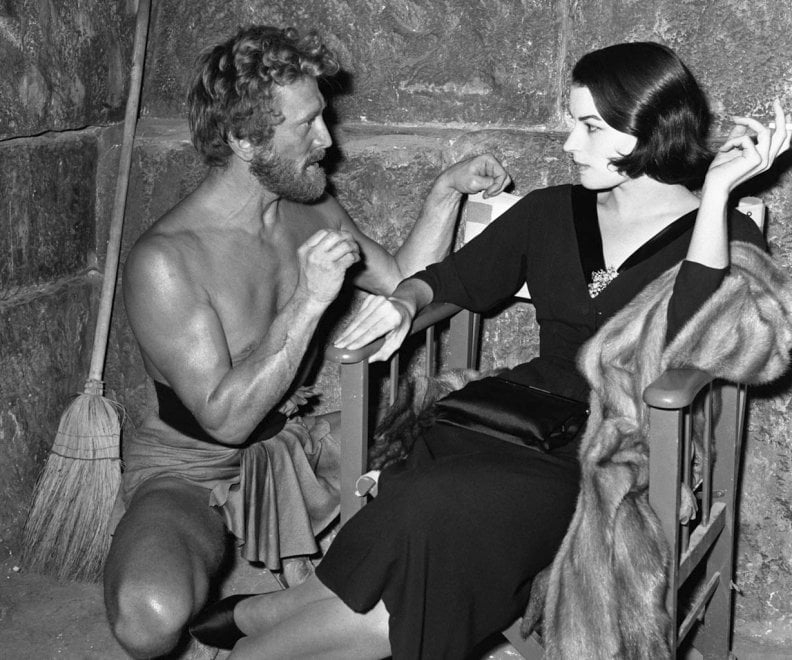
Kirk Douglas and Silvana Mangano in a pause during the shootings of Ulysses by Mario Camerini (1954)

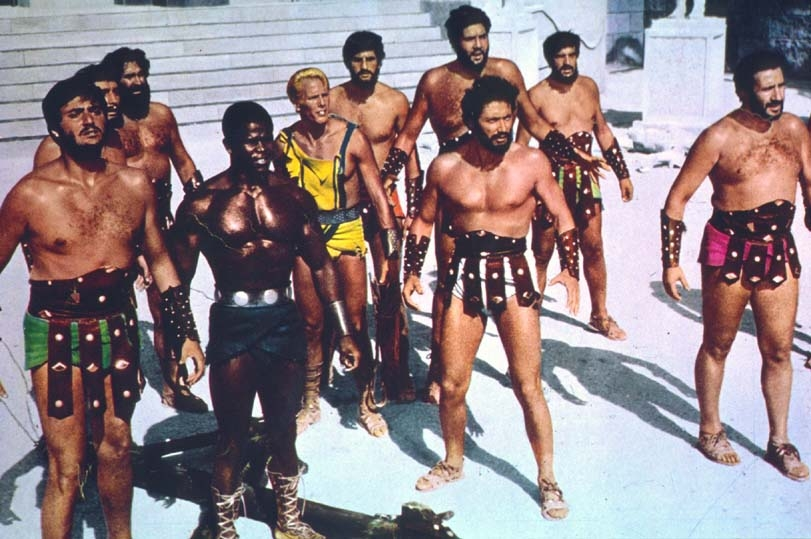
My Son, the Hero by Duccio Tessari (1962)

==== Musicarelli (1950s–1970s) ====
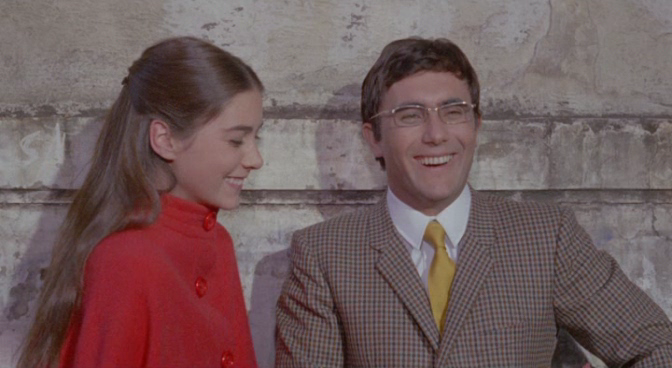
Al Bano and Romina Power in Nel sole by Aldo Grimaldi (1967)

Musicarello (pl. musicarelli) is a film subgenre which emerged in Italy and which is characterised by the presence in main roles of young singers, already famous among their peers, and their new record album. The genre began in the late 1950s, and had its peak of production in the 1960s.

The film which started the genre is considered to be I ragazzi del Juke-Box by Lucio Fulci (1959). The musicarelli were inspired by two American musicals, in particular Jailhouse Rock by Richard Thorpe (1957) and earlier Love Me Tender by Robert D. Webb (1956), both starring Elvis Presley.

At the heart of the musicarello is a hit song, or a song that the producers hoped would become a hit, that usually shares its title with the film itself and sometimes has lyrics depicting a part of the plot. In the films there are almost always tender and chaste love stories accompanied by the desire to have fun and dance without thoughts. Musicarelli reflect the desire and need for emancipation of young Italians, highlighting some generational frictions.

With the arrival of the 1968 student protests the genre started to decline, because the generational revolt became explicitly political and at the same time there was no longer music equally directed to the whole youth audience. For some time the duo Al Bano and Romina Power continued to enjoy success in musicarello films, but their films (like their songs) were a return to the traditional melody and to the musical films of the previous decades.

==== Science fiction (1950s–present) ====
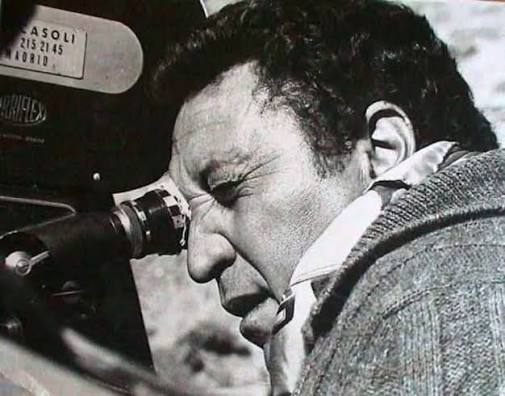
Antonio Margheriti in the 1960s, the most prolific director of the Italian science fiction strand

Italian science fiction cinema remained a minority strand, made up for the most part of low-budget films produced in the wake of successful American releases. Its beginning is traditionally dated to 1958, the year of The Day the Sky Exploded by Paolo Heusch, although the rediscovery of silent works such as The Mechanical Man (1921) has led to that date being reconsidered. The Encyclopedia of Science Fiction observes that Italian cinema leaned more towards horror than towards science fiction, and that several of the better results hover between the two.

The strand had its widest expansion in the 1960s. Antonio Margheriti, usually credited as Anthony M. Dawson, specialised in space opera with Assignment: Outer Space (1960), Battle of the Worlds (1961) and the four Gamma One films shot back to back between 1965 and 1967, while Mario Bava's Planet of the Vampires (1965) blended science fiction with Gothic horror and has been described as a predecessor of Alien (1979). Satire and parody are regarded as the most original Italian contribution to the genre, from Tinto Brass's Il disco volante (1964) to Elio Petri's The 10th Victim (1965) and Bava's Danger: Diabolik (1968).

Later production more often exploited foreign successes, with Contamination (1980) following Alien and 1990: The Bronx Warriors (1982) owing much to Escape from New York. Genre production collapsed in the 1990s, whose main exception is Gabriele Salvatores's cyberpunk Nirvana (1997), the greatest commercial success of Italian science fiction cinema. From the 2010s the genre returned above all through superhero films set in contemporary Italy, such as They Call Me Jeeg (2016) and Freaks Out (2021) by Gabriele Mainetti.

=== 1960s ===
==== Spaghetti Western (1960s–1970s) ====
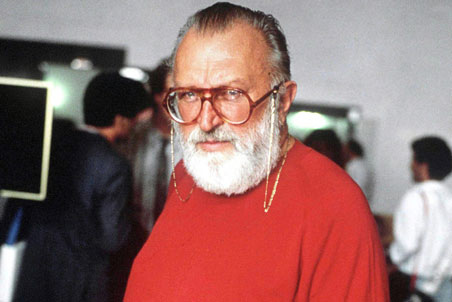
Sergio Leone, widely regarded as one of the most influential directors in the history of cinema.

On the heels of the sword-and-sandal craze, a related genre, the Spaghetti Western arose and was popular both in Italy and elsewhere. These films differed from traditional westerns by being filmed in Europe on limited budgets, but featured vivid cinematography. The term was used by foreign critics because most of these westerns were produced and directed by Italians.

The most popular Spaghetti Westerns were those of Sergio Leone, credited as the inventor of the genre, whose Dollars Trilogy (1964's A Fistful of Dollars, an unauthorized remake of the Japanese film Yojimbo by Akira Kurosawa; 1965's For a Few Dollars More, an original sequel; and 1966's The Good, the Bad and the Ugly, a World-famous prequel), featuring Clint Eastwood as a character marketed as "the Man with No Name" and notorious scores by Ennio Morricone, came to define the genre along with Once Upon a Time in the West (1968).

Another popular Spaghetti Western film is Sergio Corbucci Django (1966), starring Franco Nero as the titular character, another Yojimbo plagiarism, produced to capitalize on the success of A Fistful of Dollars. The original Django was followed by both an authorized sequel (1987's Django Strikes Again) and an overwhelming number of unauthorized uses of the same character in other films.

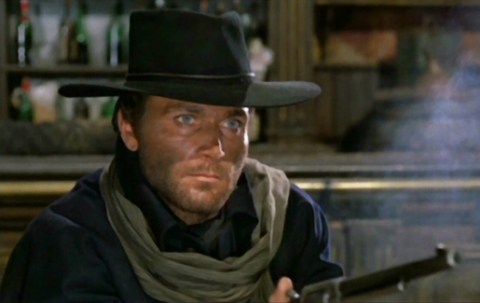
Franco Nero as Django in the film of the same name by Sergio Corbucci (1966).

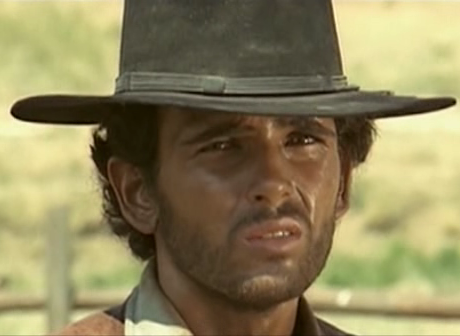
The Forgotten Pistolero by Ferdinando Baldi (1969)

==== Bud Spencer and Terence Hill (1960s–1990s) ====
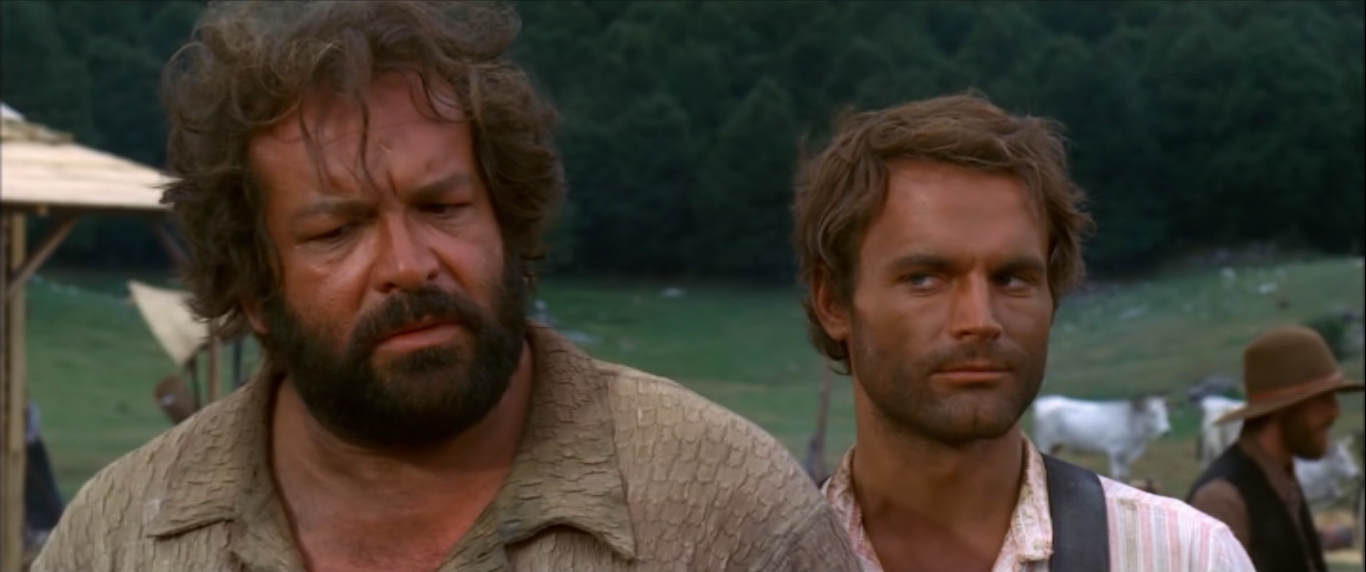
Bud Spencer and Terence Hill in They Call Me Trinity by Enzo Barboni (1970)

Also considered Spaghetti Westerns is a film genre which combined traditional western ambience with a Commedia all'italiana-type comedy; films including They Call Me Trinity (1970) and Trinity Is Still My Name (1971), both by Enzo Barboni, which featured Bud Spencer and Terence Hill, the stage names of Carlo Pedersoli and Mario Girotti.

Terence Hill and Bud Spencer made numerous films together. Most of their early films were Spaghetti Westerns, beginning with God Forgives... I Don't! (1967), the first part of a trilogy, followed by Ace High (1968) and Boot Hill (1969), but they also starred in comedies such as ... All the Way, Boys! (1972) and Watch Out, We're Mad! (1974).

The next films shot by the couple of actors, almost all comedies, were Two Missionaries (1974), Crime Busters (1977), Odds and Evens (1978), I'm for the Hippopotamus (1979), Who Finds a Friend Finds a Treasure (1981), Go for It (1983), Double Trouble (1984), Miami Supercops (1985) and Troublemakers (1994).

==== Giallo (1960s–present) ====
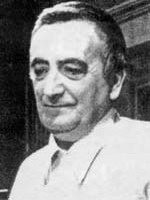
Mario Bava, referred to as the "Master of Italian Horror" and the "Master of the Macabre".

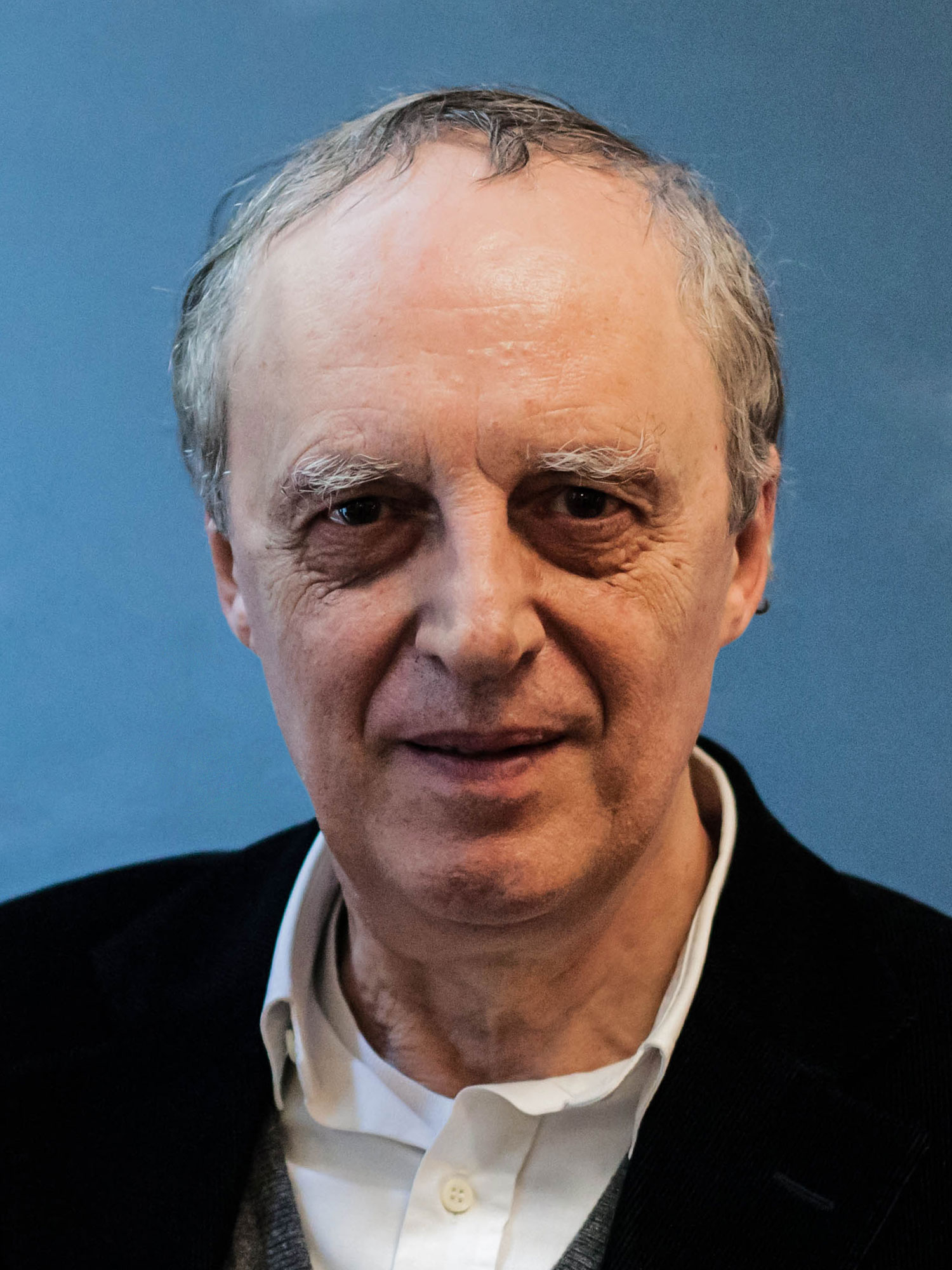
Dario Argento, referred to as the "Master of the Thrill" and the "Master of Horror".

During the 1960s and 1970s, Italian filmmakers Mario Bava, Riccardo Freda, Antonio Margheriti and Dario Argento developed giallo (plural gialli, from giallo, Italian for "yellow") horror films that become classics and influenced the genre in other countries. Representative films include: The Girl Who Knew Too Much (1963), Castle of Blood (1964), The Bird with the Crystal Plumage (1970), Twitch of the Death Nerve (1971), Deep Red (1975) and Suspiria (1977).

Giallo is a genre of mystery fiction and thrillers and often contains slasher, crime fiction, psychological thriller, psychological horror, sexploitation, and, less frequently, supernatural horror elements. Giallo developed in the mid-to-late 1960s, peaked in popularity during the 1970s, and subsequently declined in commercial mainstream filmmaking over the next few decades, though examples continue to be produced. It was a predecessor to, and had significant influence on, the later American slasher film genre.

Giallo usually blends the atmosphere and suspense of thriller fiction with elements of horror fiction (such as slasher violence) and eroticism (similar to the French fantastique genre), and often involves a mysterious killer whose identity is not revealed until the final act of the film. Most critics agree that the giallo represents a distinct category with unique features, but there is some disagreement on what exactly defines a giallo film.

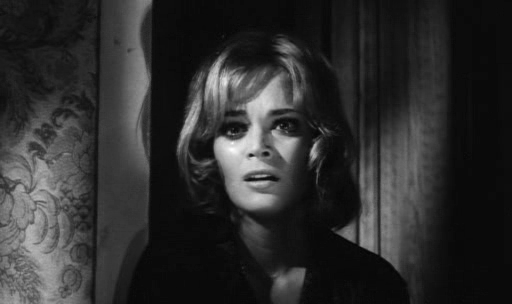
The Girl Who Knew Too Much by Mario Bava (1963), considered by most critics to be the first giallo film.

Giallo films are generally characterized as gruesome murder-mystery thrillers that combine the suspense elements of detective fiction with scenes of shocking horror, featuring excessive bloodletting, stylish camerawork and often jarring musical arrangements. The archetypal giallo plot involves a mysterious, black-gloved psychopathic killer who stalks and butchers a series of beautiful women. While most gialli involve a human killer, some also feature a supernatural element.

The typical giallo protagonist is an outsider of some type, often a traveller, tourist, outcast, or even an alienated or disgraced private investigator, and frequently a young woman, often a young woman who is lonely or alone in a strange or foreign situation or environment (gialli rarely or less frequently feature law enforcement officers as chief protagonists).

The protagonists are generally or often unconnected to the murders before they begin and are drawn to help find the killer through their role as witnesses to one of the murders. The mystery is the identity of the killer, who is often revealed in the climax to be another key character, who conceals his or her identity with a disguise (usually some combination of hat, mask, sunglasses, gloves, and trench coat). Thus, the literary whodunit element of the giallo novels is retained, while being filtered through horror genre elements and Italy's long-standing tradition of opera and staged grand guignol drama. The structure of giallo films is also sometimes reminiscent of the so-called "weird menace" pulp magazine horror mystery genre alongside Edgar Allan Poe and Agatha Christie.

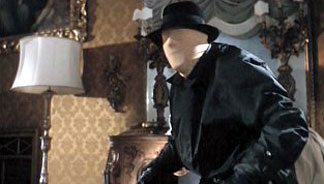
A scene from Blood and Black Lace by Mario Bava (1964)

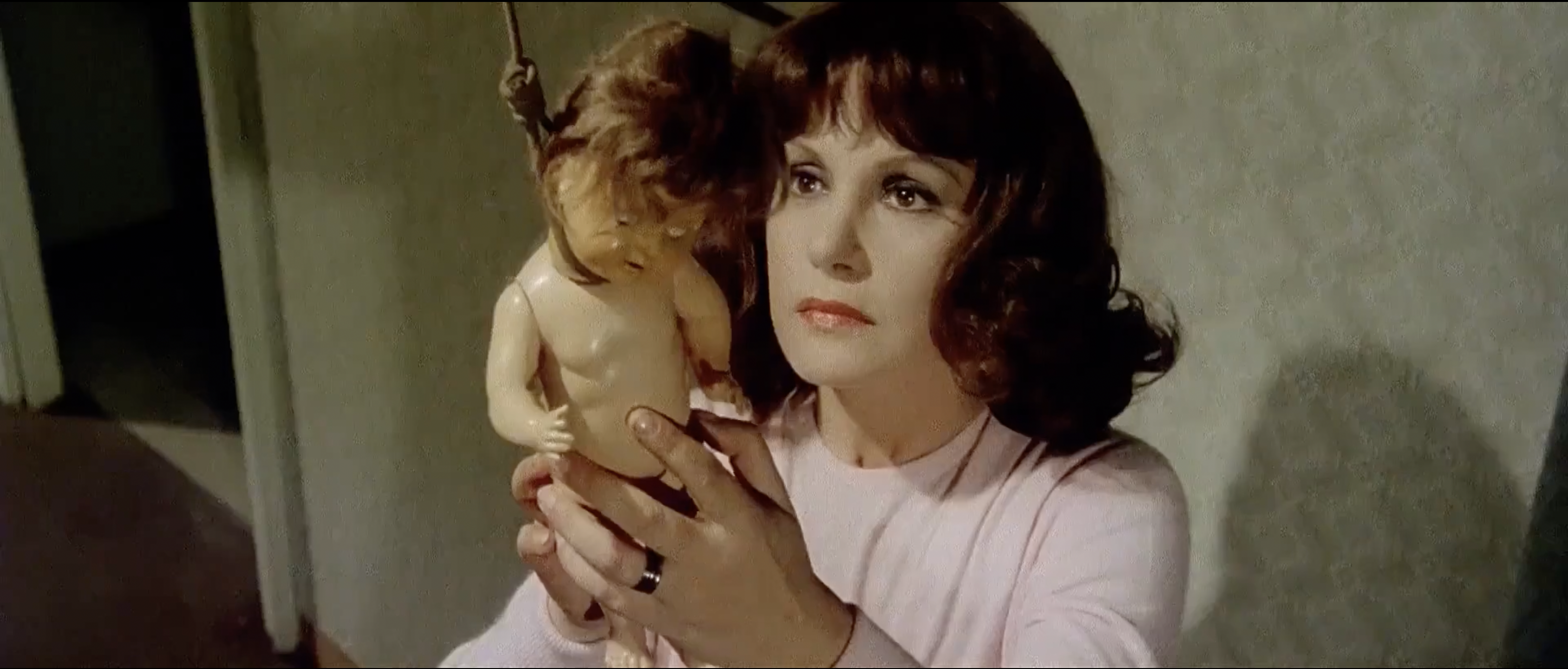
Giuliana Calandra in a famous scene from Deep Red by Dario Argento (1975)

==== Poliziotteschi (1960s–1970s) ====
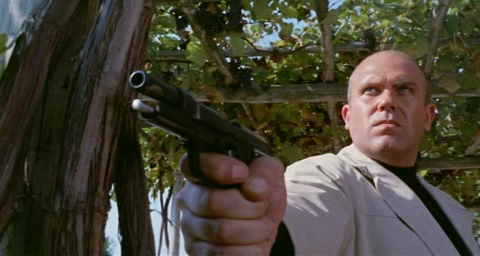
Caliber 9 by Fernando Di Leo (1972)

Poliziotteschi (plural of poliziottesco) films constitute a subgenre of crime and action films that emerged in Italy in the late 1960s and reached the height of their popularity in the 1970s. They are also known as polizieschi all'italiana, Euro-crime, Italo-crime, spaghetti crime films', or simply Italian crime films.

Influenced by both 1970s French crime films and gritty 1960s and 1970s American cop films and vigilante films, poliziotteschi films were made amidst an atmosphere of socio-political turmoil in Italy and increasing Italian crime rates.

The films generally featured graphic and brutal violence, organized crime, car chases, vigilantism, heists, gunfights, and corruption up to the highest levels. The protagonists were generally tough working-class loners, willing to act outside a corrupt or overly bureaucratic system. Notable international actors who acted in this genre of films include Alain Delon, Henry Silva, Fred Williamson, Charles Bronson, Tomas Milian and others.

==== Franco and Ciccio (1960s–1980s) ====
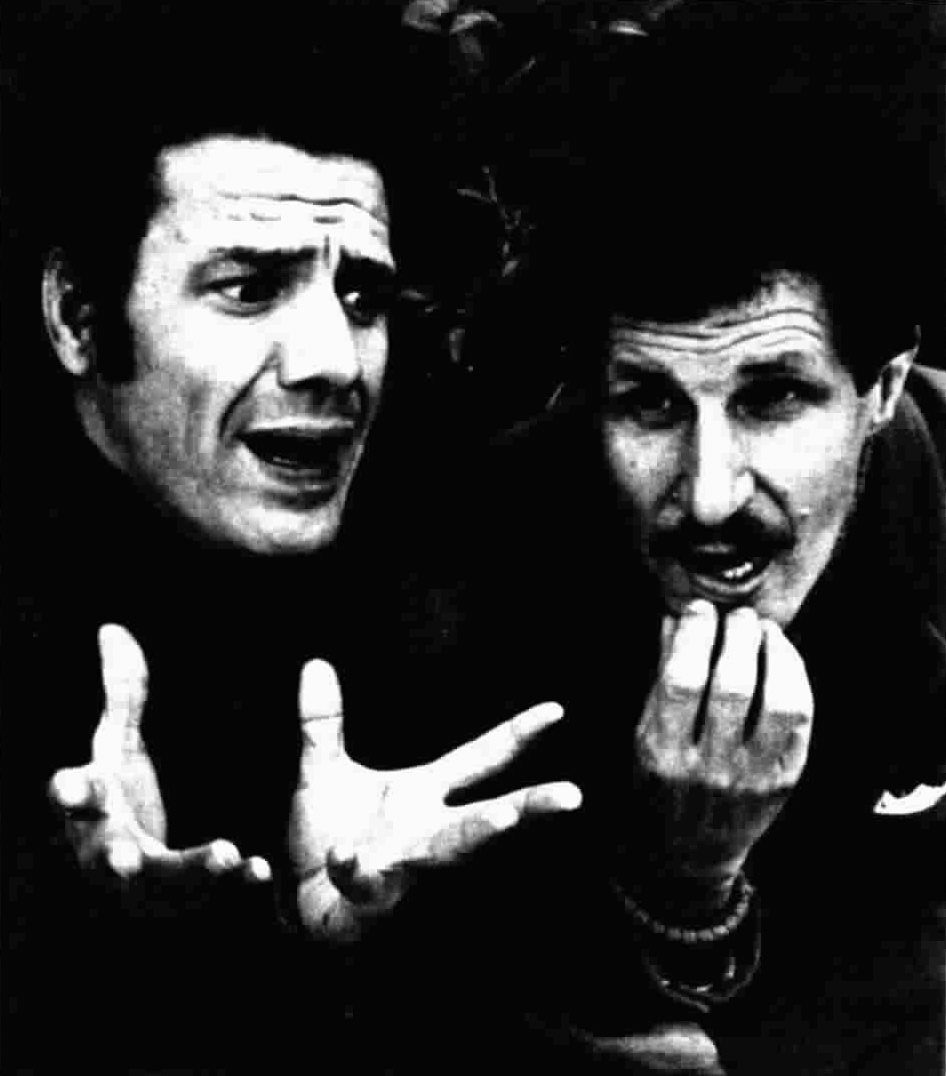
From left to right, Franco and Ciccio

Franco and Ciccio were a comedy duo formed by Italian actors Franco Franchi (1928–1992) and Ciccio Ingrassia (1922–2003), particularly popular in the 1960s and 1970s. Together, they appeared in 116 films, usually as the main characters, and occasionally as supporting characters in films featuring well-known actors such as Totò, Domenico Modugno, Vittorio Gassman, Buster Keaton and Vincent Price.

Their collaboration began in 1954 in the theatre field, and ended with Franchi's death in 1992. The two made their cinema debut in 1960 with the film Appuntamento a Ischia. After, seeing them in this film Modugno, who wanted them with him in his film, and remained active until 1984 when they shot their last film together, Kaos, although there were some interruptions in 1973, and from 1975 to 1980.

They acted in films certainly made in a short time and with few means, such as those shot with director Marcello Ciorciolini, sometimes even making a dozen films in a year, often without a real script and where they often improvised on the set. Also are the 13 films directed by Lucio Fulci, who was the architect of the reversal of their typical roles by making Ciccio the serious one, the sidekick, and Franco the comic one.

They also worked with important directors such as Pier Paolo Pasolini and the Taviani brothers. At the time, they were considered protagonists of B movie, they were subsequently reevaluated by critics for their comedy and creative abilities, becoming the subject of study. The huge success with the public is evidenced by the box office earnings, which in the 1960s, represented 10% of the annual earnings in Italy.

==== Social and political cinema (1960s–1970s) ====
The auteur cinema of the 1960s continues its path by analyzing distinct themes and problems. A new authorial vision is emancipated from the surreal and existential veins of Fellini and Antonioni which sees cinema as an ideal means of denouncing corruption and malfeasance, both in the political system and in the industrial world. Thus was born the structure of the investigative film which, starting from the neorealist analysis of the facts, added to them a concise critical judgment, with the manifest intent of shaking the consciences of public opinion. This typology deliberately touches upon burning issues, often targeting the established power, with the intent of reconstructing a historical truth that is often hidden or denied.

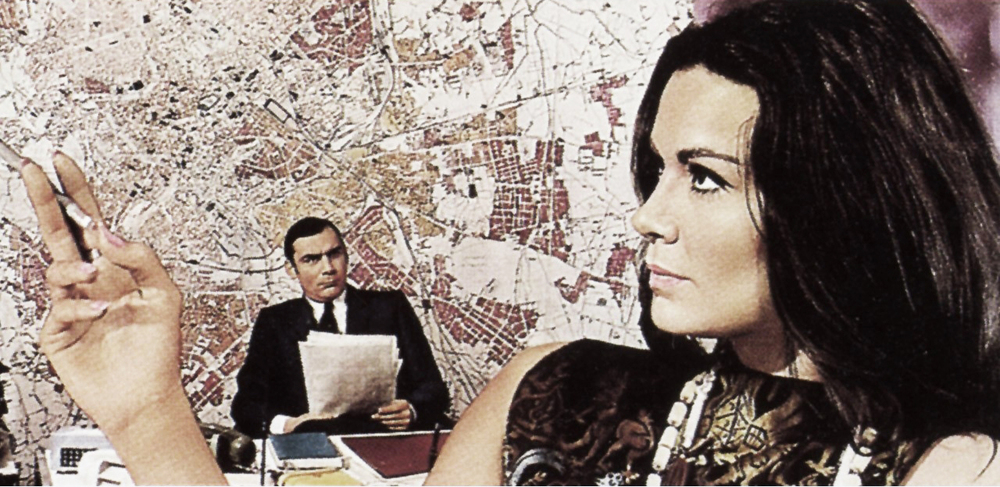
Gian Maria Volonté and Florinda Bolkan in Investigation of a Citizen Above Suspicion by Elio Petri (1970)

The precursor of this way of understanding the director's profession was Francesco Rosi. In 1962 he inaugurated the investigation film project retracing, through a series of long flashbacks, the life of the homonym Sicilian criminal in the film Salvatore Giuliano. The following year he directed Rod Steiger in Hands over the City (1963), in which he courageously denounced the collusion existing between the various organs of the State and the building exploitation in Naples. The film was awarded the Golden Lion at the Venice Film Festival.

One of Francesco Rosi's most famous films of denunciation is The Mattei Affair (1972), a rigorous documentary into the mysterious disappearance of Enrico Mattei, manager of Eni, a large Italian state group. The film won the Palme d'Or at the Cannes Film Festival. It became (together with the tight Illustrious Corpses (1976)) a true model for similar denunciation films produced both in Italy and abroad. Famous films of denunciation by Elio Petri are The Working Class Goes to Heaven (1971), a corrosive denunciation of life in the factory (winner of the Palme d'Or at Cannes) and Investigation of a Citizen Above Suspicion (1970). The latter (accompanied by the incisive soundtrack by Ennio Morricone) is a dry psychoanalytic thriller centred on the aberrations of power, analyzed in a pathological key. The film obtained a wide consensus, winning the Academy Award for Best International Feature Film the following year.

Arguments related to civilian cinema can be found in the work of Damiano Damiani, who with The Day of the Owl (1968) enjoyed considerable success. Other feature films include, Confessions of a Police Captain (1971), The Case Is Closed, Forget It (1971), How to Kill a Judge (1974) and I Am Afraid (1977). Also Pasquale Squitieri for the film Il prefetto di ferro (1977) and Giuliano Montaldo, who after some experiences as an actor, staged some historical and political films such as The Fifth Day of Peace (1970), Sacco & Vanzetti (1971) and Giordano Bruno (1973). Also Nanni Loy for the film In Prison Awaiting Trial (1971) starring Alberto Sordi.

=== 1970s ===
Marcello Mastroianni and Sophia Loren in A Special Day by Ettore Scola (1977)

In the 1970s the work done by the director Lina Wertmüller was influential, who together with the well-established actors Giancarlo Giannini and Mariangela Melato, gave life to successful films such as The Seduction of Mimi (1972), Love and Anarchy (1973) and Swept Away (1974). Two years later, with Seven Beauties (1976), she obtained four nominations for the Academy Awards, making her the first woman ever to receive a nomination for best director.

The last protagonist of the great season of the comedy is the director Ettore Scola. Throughout the 1950s, he played the role of screenwriter, and then makes his directorial debut in 1964 with the film Let's Talk About Women. In 1974, he directed his best-known film, We All Loved Each Other So Much, which traces 30 years of Italian history through the stories of three friends: the lawyer Gianni Perego (Vittorio Gassman), the porter Antonio (Nino Manfredi) and the intellectual Nicola (Stefano Satta Flores). Other films include, Down and Dirty (1976) starring Nino Manfredi, and A Special Day (1977) starring Sophia Loren and Marcello Mastroianni.

==== Commedia sexy all'italiana (1970s–1980s) ====
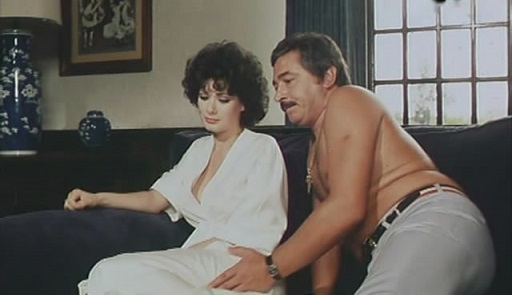
La moglie vergine by Marino Girolami (1975)

Commedia sexy all'italiana is characterized typically by both abundant female nudity and comedy, and by the minimal weight given to social criticism that was the basic ingredient of the main commedia all'italiana genre. Stories are often set in affluent environments such as wealthy households. It is closely connected to the sexual revolution, which was extremely new and innovative for that period. For the first time, films with female nudity could be watched at the cinema. Pornography and scenes of explicit sex were still forbidden in Italian cinemas, but partial nudity was somewhat tolerated. The genre has been described as a cross between bawdy comedy and humorous erotic film with ample slapstick elements which follow more or less clichéd storylines.

During this time, commedia sexy all'italiana films, described by the film critics of the time as not artistic or "trash films", were very popular in Italy. Today they are widely re-evaluated and have become real cult movies. They also allowed the producers of Italian cinema to have enough revenue to produce successful artistic films. These comedy films were of little artistic value and reached their popularity by confronting Italian social taboos, most notably in the sexual sphere. Actors such as Lando Buzzanca, Lino Banfi, Renzo Montagnani, Alvaro Vitali, Gloria Guida, Barbara Bouchet and Edwige Fenech owe much of their popularity to these films.

==== Fantozzi (1970s–1990s) ====
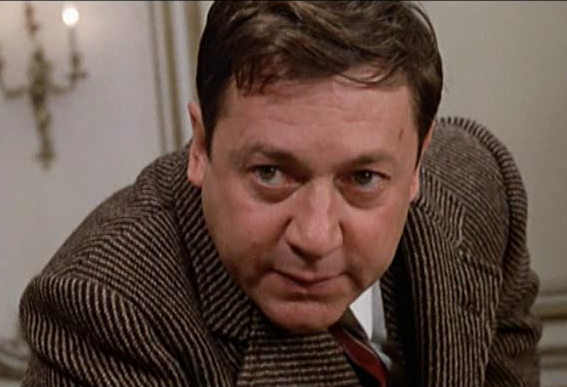
Paolo Villaggio as Ugo Fantozzi in Fantozzi by Luciano Salce (1975)

The films starring Ugo Fantozzi, a character invented by Paolo Villaggio for his television sketches and newspaper short stories, also fell within the comic satirical comedy genre. Although Villaggio's movies tend to bridge comedy with a more elevated social satire, this character had a great impact on Italian society, to such a degree that the adjective fantozziano entered the lexicon. Ugo Fantozzi represents the archetype of the average Italian of the 1970s, middle-class with a simple lifestyle with the anxieties common to an entire class of workers, being re-evaluated by critics.

Of the many films telling of Fantozzi's misadventures, the most notable and famous were Fantozzi (1975) and Il secondo tragico Fantozzi (1976), both directed by Luciano Salce, but many others were produced. The other films were Fantozzi contro tutti (1980) directed by Neri Parenti, Fantozzi subisce ancora (1983) by Neri Parenti, Superfantozzi (1986) by Neri Parenti, Fantozzi va in pensione (1988) by Neri Parenti, Fantozzi alla riscossa (1990) by Neri Parenti, Fantozzi in paradiso (1993) by Neri Parenti, Fantozzi - Il ritorno (1996) by Neri Parenti and Fantozzi 2000 - La clonazione (1999) by Domenico Saverni.

==== Sceneggiata (1970s–1990s) ====
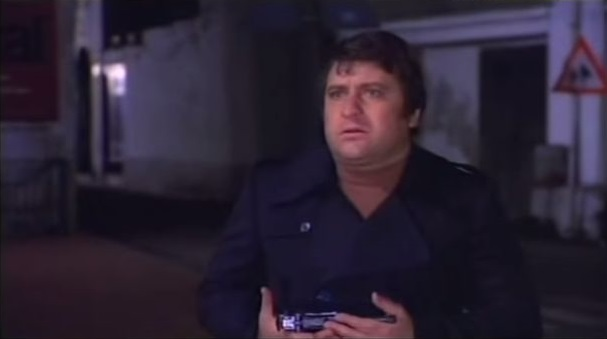
Sgarro alla camorra by Ettore Maria Fizzarotti (1973)

The sceneggiata (pl. sceneggiate) or sceneggiata napoletana is a form of musical drama typical of Naples. Beginning as a form of musical theatre after World War I, it was also adapted for cinema; sceneggiata films became especially popular in the 1970s, and contributed to the genre becoming more widely known outside Naples. The most famous actors who played dramas were Mario Merola, Mario Trevi, and Nino D'Angelo.

The sceneggiata can be roughly described as a "musical soap opera", where action and dialogue are interspersed with Neapolitan songs. Plots revolve around melodramatic themes drawing from the Neapolitan culture and tradition, including passion, jealousy, betrayal, personal deceit and treachery, honour, vengeance, and life in the world of petty crime. Songs and dialogue were originally in Neapolitan dialect, although, especially in film production, Italian has sometimes been preferred, to reach a larger audience.

Sgarro alla camorra (i.e. "Offence to the Camorra", 1973), written and directed by Ettore Maria Fizzarotti and starring Mario Merola at his film debut, is regarded as the first sceneggiata film and as a prototype for the genre. It was shot in Cetara, Province of Salerno. Outside Italy, sceneggiata is mostly known in areas populated by Italian immigrants. Besides Naples, the second homeland of sceneggiata is probably Little Italy in New York City.

=== 1980s ===
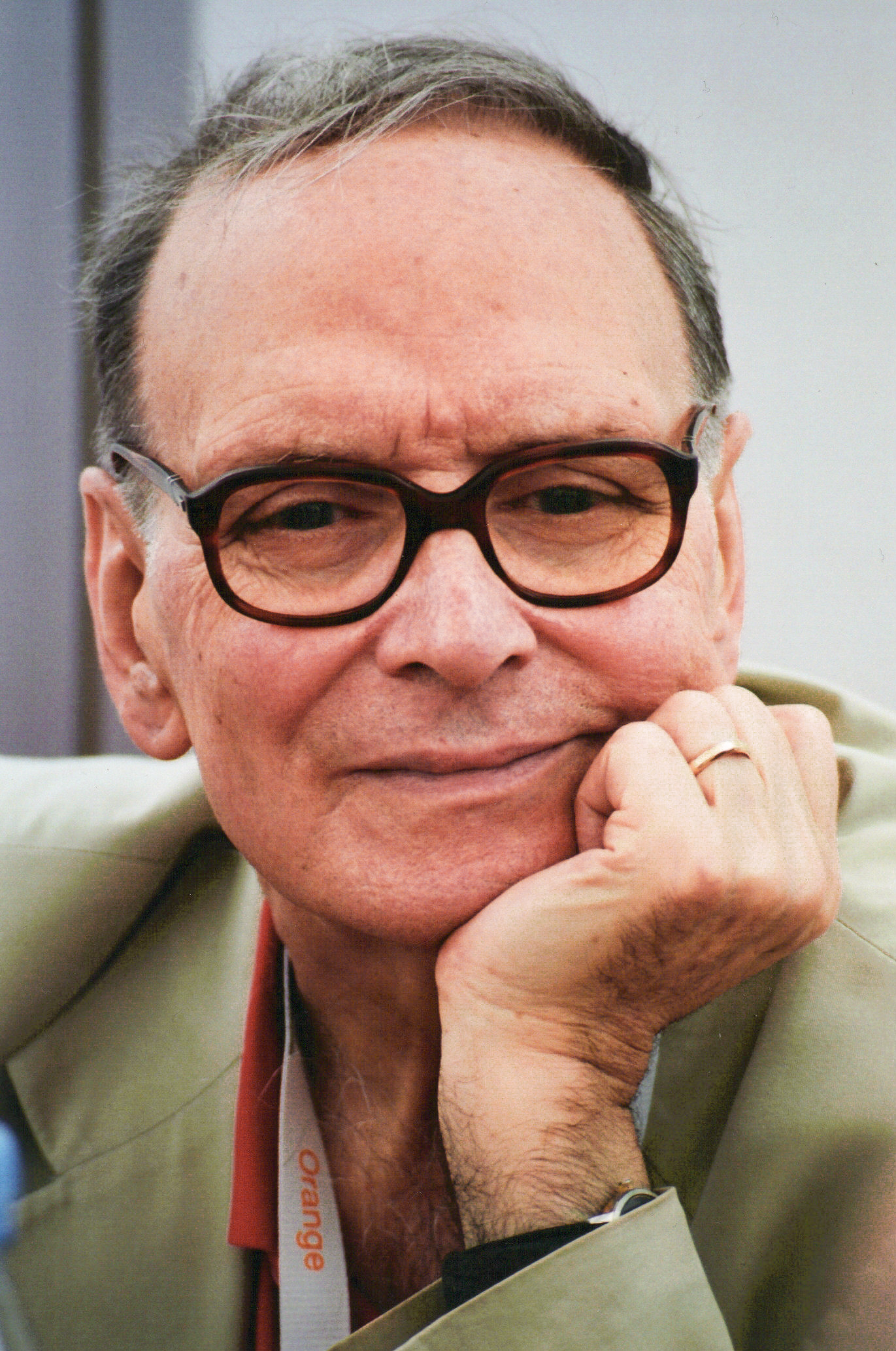
Ennio Morricone has composed over 500 scores for cinema and television since 1946. He is widely considered one of the most prolific and greatest film composers of all time.

The 1980s was a period of decline for Italian filmmaking. In 1985, only 80 films were produced (the least since the postwar period) and the total number of audience decreased from 525 million in 1970 to 123 million. It is a physiological process that invests, in the same period as other countries, with a great cinematographic tradition such as Japan, United Kingdom and France. The era of producers ended; Carlo Ponti and Dino De Laurentiis work abroad, Goffredo Lombardo and Franco Cristaldi were no longer key figures. The crisis affects the Italian genre cinema above all, which, by virtue of the success of commercial television, is deprived of the vast majority of its audience. As a result, cinemas began showing mainly Hollywood films, which steadily took over, while many other cinemas closed.

Among the major artistic films of this era were La città delle donne, E la nave va, Ginger and Fred by Fellini, L'albero degli zoccoli by Ermanno Olmi (winner of the Palme d'Or at the Cannes Film Festival), La notte di San Lorenzo by Paolo and Vittorio Taviani, Antonioni's Identificazione di una donna, and Bianca and La messa è finita by Nanni Moretti. Although not entirely Italian, Bernardo Bertolucci's The Last Emperor, winner of 9 Oscars including Best Picture and Best Director, and Once Upon a Time in America of Sergio Leone came out of this period also.

Non ci resta che piangere, directed by and starring both Roberto Benigni and Massimo Troisi, is a cult movie in Italy.

Carlo Verdone, actor, screenwriter and film director, is best known for his comedic roles in Italian classics, which he also wrote and directed. His career was jumpstarted by his first three successes, Un sacco bello (1980), Bianco, rosso e Verdone (1981) and Borotalco (1982). Since the 1990s, he has been introducing more serious subjects in his work, linked to the excesses of society and the individual's hardships in confronting it; some examples are Maledetto il giorno che t'ho incontrata (1992), Il mio miglior nemico (2006) and Io, loro e Lara (2010).

Francesco Nuti began his professional career as an actor in the late 1970s, when he formed the cabaret group Giancattivi together with Alessandro Benvenuti and Athina Cenci. The group took part in the TV shows Black Out and Non Stop for RAI TV, and shot their first feature film, West of Paperino (1981), written and directed by Benvenuti. The following year Nuti abandoned the trio and began a solo career with three movies directed by Maurizio Ponzi: What a Ghostly Silence There Is Tonight (1982), The Pool Hustlers (1982) and Son contento (1983). Starting in 1985, he began to direct his movies, scoring an immediate success with the films Casablanca, Casablanca and All the Fault of Paradise (1985), Stregati (1987), Caruso Pascoski, Son of a Pole (1988), Willy Signori e vengo da lontano (1990) and Women in Skirts (1991). The 1990s were however a period of decline for the Tuscan director, with poorly successful movies such as OcchioPinocchio (1994), Mr. Fifteen Balls (1998), Io amo Andrea (2000) and Caruso, Zero for Conduct (2001).

The cinepanettoni (singular: cinepanettone) are a series of farcical comedy films, one or two of which are scheduled for release annually in Italy during the Christmas period. The films were originally produced by Aurelio De Laurentiis' Filmauro studio. These films are usually focused on the holidays of stereotypical Italians: bungling, wealthy and presumptuous members of the middle class who visit famous, glamorous or exotic places.

=== 1990s ===
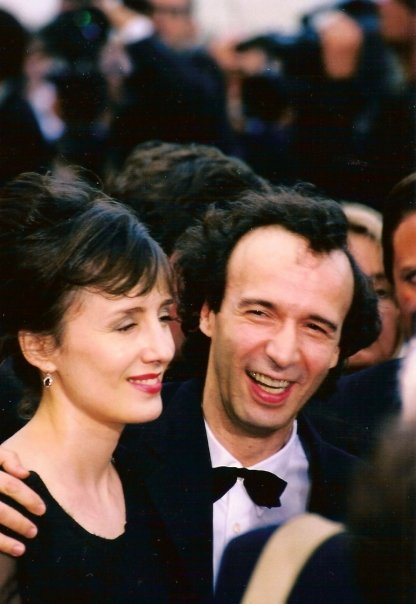
Roberto Benigni and Nicoletta Braschi

The economic crisis that emerged in the 1980s began to ease over the next decade. Nonetheless, the 1992–93 and 1993–94 seasons marked an all-time low in the number of films made, in the national market share (15 per cent), in the total number of viewers (under 90 million per year) and in the number of cinemas. The effect of this industrial contraction sanctions the total disappearance of Italian genre cinema in the middle of the decade, as it was no longer suitable to compete with the contemporary big Hollywood blockbusters (mainly due to the enormous budget differences available), with its directors and actors who therefore almost entirely switch to television film.

A new generation of directors has helped return Italian cinema to a healthy level since the end of the 1980s. Probably the most noted film of the period is Nuovo Cinema Paradiso, for which Giuseppe Tornatore won a 1989 Oscar (awarded in 1990) for Best Foreign Language Film. This award was followed when Gabriele Salvatores's Mediterraneo won the same prize in 1991.

Il Postino: The Postman (1994), directed by the British Michael Radford and starring Massimo Troisi, received five nominations at the Academy Awards, including Best Picture and Best Actor for Troisi, and won for Best Original Score. Another exploit was in 1998 when Roberto Benigni won three Oscars for his movie Life Is Beautiful (La vita è bella) (Best Actor for Benigni himself, Best Foreign Film, Best Music). The film was also nominated for Best Picture.

Leonardo Pieraccioni made his directorial debut with The Graduates (1995). In 1996 he directed his breakthrough film The Cyclone, which grossed Lire 75 billion at the box office.

=== 2000s ===
With the new millennium, the Italian film industry regained stability and critical recognition. In 1995, 93 films were produced, while in 2005, 274 films were made. In 2006, the national market share reached 31 per cent. In 2001, Nanni Moretti's film The Son's Room (La stanza del figlio) received the Palme d'Or at the Cannes Film Festival. Other noteworthy recent Italian films include: Jona che visse nella balena directed by Roberto Faenza, Il grande cocomero by Francesca Archibugi, The Profession of Arms (Il mestiere delle armi) by Olmi, L'ora di religione by Marco Bellocchio, Il ladro di bambini, Lamerica, The Keys to the House (Le chiavi di casa) by Gianni Amelio, I'm Not Scared (Io non-ho paura) by Gabriele Salvatores, Le Fate Ignoranti, Facing Windows (La finestra di fronte) by Ferzan Özpetek, Good Morning, Night (Buongiorno, notte) by Marco Bellocchio, The Best of Youth (La meglio gioventù) by Marco Tullio Giordana, The Beast in the Heart (La bestia nel cuore) by Cristina Comencini. In 2008 Paolo Sorrentino's Il Divo, a biographical film based on the life of Giulio Andreotti, won the Jury prize and Gomorra, a crime drama film, directed by Matteo Garrone won the Gran Prix at the Cannes Film Festival.

=== 2010s ===
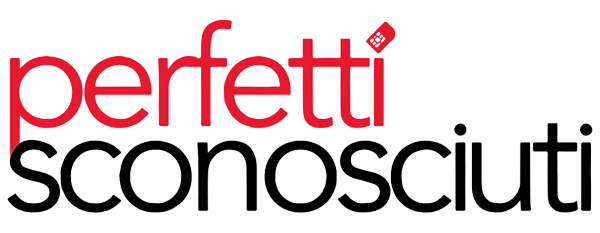
Perfect Strangers (2016) by Paolo Genovese was included in the Guinness World Records as the most remade film in cinema history, with a total of 18 remakes.

Paolo Sorrentino's The Great Beauty (La Grande Bellezza) won the 2014 Academy Award for Best Foreign Language Film.

The two highest-grossing Italian films in Italy have both been directed by Gennaro Nunziante and starred Checco Zalone: Sole a catinelle (2013) with €51.8 million, and Quo Vado? (2016) with €65.3 million.

They Call Me Jeeg, a 2016 critically acclaimed superhero film directed by Gabriele Mainetti and starring Claudio Santamaria, won many awards, such as eight David di Donatello, two Nastro d'Argento, and a Globo d'oro.

Gianfranco Rosi's documentary film Fire at Sea (2016) won the Golden Bear at the 66th Berlin International Film Festival. They Call Me Jeeg and Fire at Sea were also selected as the Italian entry for the Best Foreign Language Film at the 89th Academy Awards, but they were not nominated.

Other successful 2010s Italian films include: Vincere and The Traitor by Marco Bellocchio, The First Beautiful Thing (La prima cosa bella), Human Capital (Il capitale umano) and Like Crazy (La pazza gioia) by Paolo Virzì, We Have a Pope (Habemus Papam) and Mia Madre by Nanni Moretti, Caesar Must Die (Cesare deve morire) by Paolo and Vittorio Taviani, Don't Be Bad (Non essere cattivo) by Claudio Caligari, Romanzo Criminale by Michele Placido (that spawned a TV series, Romanzo criminale - La serie), Youth (La giovinezza) by Paolo Sorrentino, Suburra by Stefano Sollima, Perfect Strangers (Perfetti sconosciuti) by Paolo Genovese, Mediterranea and A Ciambra by Jonas Carpignano, Italian Race (Veloce come il vento) and The First King: Birth of an Empire (Il primo re) by Matteo Rovere, and Tale of Tales (Il racconto dei racconti), Dogman and Pinocchio by Matteo Garrone.

Call Me by Your Name (2017), the final installment in Luca Guadagnino's thematic Desire trilogy, following I Am Love (2009) and A Bigger Splash (2015), received widespread acclaim and numerous accolades, including the Academy Award for Best Adapted Screenplay and the nomination for Best Picture in 2018.

Perfect Strangers by Paolo Genovese was included in the Guinness World Records as it became the most remade film in cinema history, with a total of 18 versions of the film.

=== 2020s ===
Italian cinema in the 2020s has been marked by a renewed interest in social issues, the emergence of new directors, and the growing influence of streaming platforms alongside traditional theatrical releases. The COVID-19 pandemic initially disrupted production and distribution, encouraging hybrid release strategies and accelerating the role of digital platforms in reaching audiences.

Among the decade’s most notable successes is There’s Still Tomorrow (C’è ancora domani, 2023), which became the highest-grossing Italian release of the year, won six David di Donatello awards, and sparked public debate on gender roles and domestic violence. Matteo Garrone’s Io capitano (2023), recounting the migration journey of two Senegalese teenagers, premiered at Venice where it won the Silver Lion for Best Director and was selected as Italy’s Oscar submission. At the same festival, Stefano Sollima presented Adagio (2023), a crime drama with Pierfrancesco Favino and Toni Servillo, acclaimed as the conclusion to his Roman trilogy.

Other successful 2020s Italian films include: The Life Ahead by Edoardo Ponti, Hidden Away by Giorgio Diritti, Bad Tales by Damiano and Fabio D'Innocenzo, The Predators by Pietro Castellitto, Padrenostro by Claudio Noce, Notturno by Gianfranco Rosi, The King of Laughter by Mario Martone, A Chiara by Jonas Carpignano, Freaks Out by Gabriele Mainetti, The Hand of God by Paolo Sorrentino, Nostalgia by Mario Martone, Dry by Paolo Giordano, The Hanging Sun by Francesco Carrozzini, Bones and All by Luca Guadagnino, L'immensità by Emanuele Crialese and Robbing Mussolini by Renato De Maria.

== 100 Italian films to be saved ==
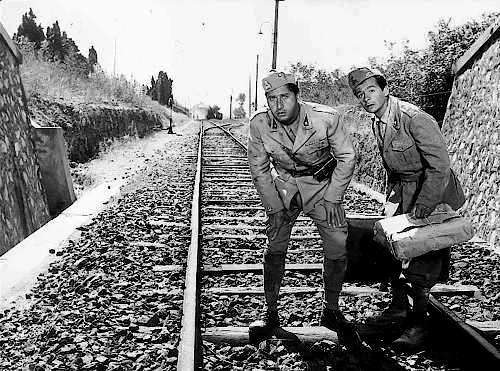
Everybody Go Home by Luigi Comencini (1960)

The list of the 100 Italian films to be saved (Italian: 100 film italiani da salvare) was created with the aim to report "100 films that have changed the collective memory of the country between 1942 and 1978". The project was established in 2008 by the Venice Days festival section of the 65th Venice International Film Festival, in collaboration with Cinecittà Holding and with the support of the Ministry of Cultural Heritage.

The list was edited by Fabio Ferzetti, film critic of the newspaper Il Messaggero, in collaboration with film director Gianni Amelio and the writers and film critics Gian Piero Brunetta, Giovanni De Luna, Gianluca Farinelli, Giovanna Grignaffini, Paolo Mereghetti, Morando Morandini, Domenico Starnone and Sergio Toffetti.

== Cinematheques ==
Cineteca Nazionale is a film archive located in Rome. Founded in 1949, here are 80,000 films on file, 600,000 photographs, 50,000 posters and the collection of the Italian Association for the History of Cinema Research (AIRSC). It arose from the archival heritage of the Centro Sperimentale di Cinematografia, which in 1943, had been removed by the Nazi occupiers, losing unique materials. Cineteca Italiana is a private film archive located in Milan. Established in 1947, and as a foundation in 1996, the Cineteca Italiana houses over 20,000 films and more than 100,000 photographs from the history of Italian and international cinema. Cineteca di Bologna is a film archive in Bologna. It was founded in 1962.

== Museums ==
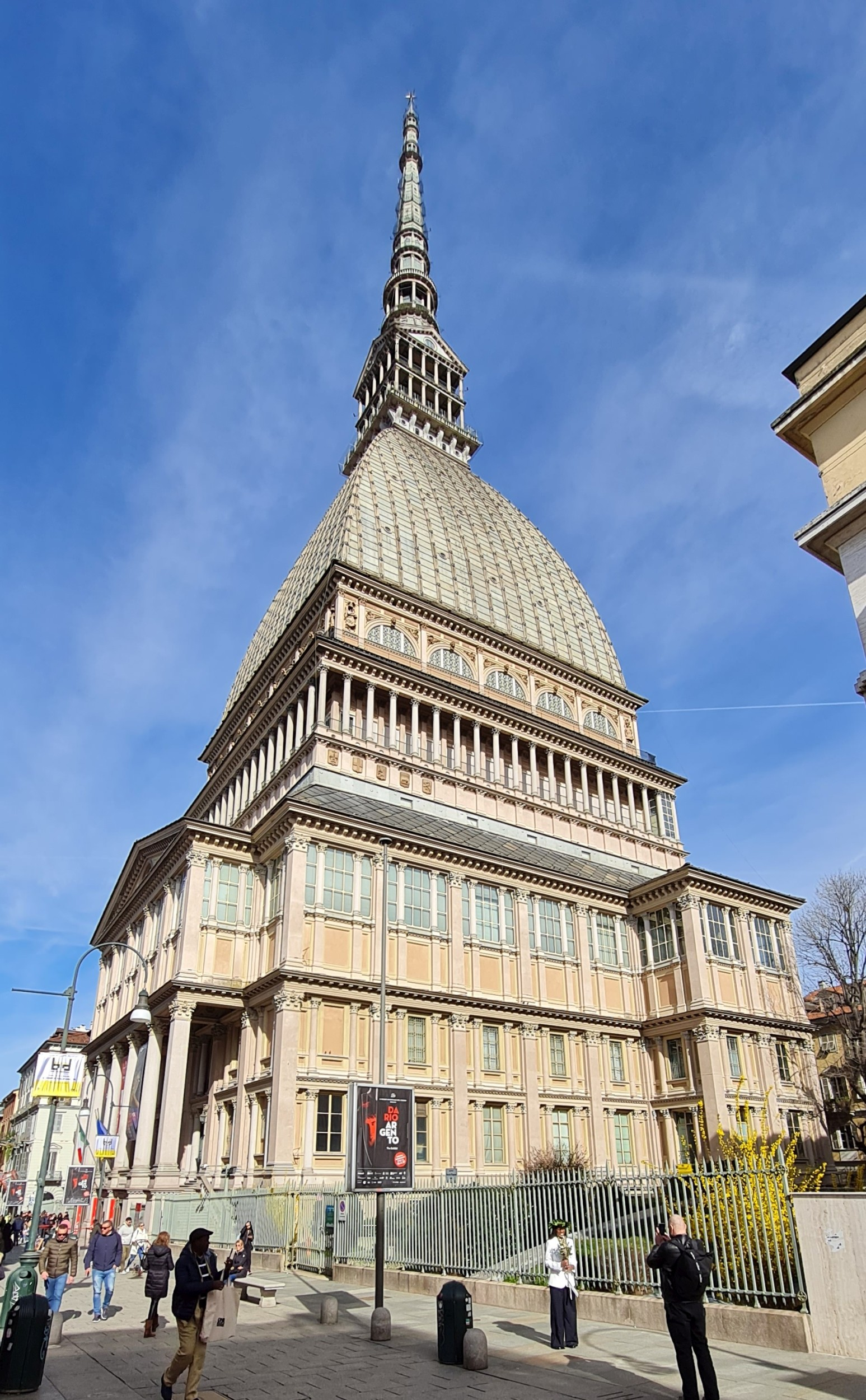
The Mole Antonelliana in Turin, which houses the National Museum of Cinema

The National Museum of Cinema (Italian: Museo Nazionale del Cinema) located in Turin is a motion picture museum inside the Mole Antonelliana tower. It is operated by the Maria Adriana Prolo Foundation, and the core of its collection is the result of the work of the historian and collector Maria Adriana Prolo. It was housed in the Palazzo Chiablese. In 2008, with 532,196 visitors, it ranked 13th among the most visited Italian museums. The museum houses pre-cinematographic optical devices such as magic lanterns, earlier and current film technologies, stage items from early Italian movies and other memorabilia. Along the exhibition path of about 35,000 square feet (3,200 m^{2}) on five levels, it is possible to visit some areas devoted to the different kinds of film crew, and in the main hall, fitted in the temple hall of the Mole (which was a building originally intended as a synagogue), a series of chapels representing several film genres.

The Museum of Precinema (Italian: Museo del Precinema) is a museum in the Palazzo Angeli, Prato della Valle, Padua, related to the history of precinema, or precursors of film. It was created in 1998 to display the Minici Zotti Collection, in collaboration with the Comune of Padua. It also produces interactive touring exhibitions and makes valuable loans to other prestigious exhibitions such as Lanterne magique et film peint at the Cinémathèque Française in Paris and the National Museum of Cinema in Turin.

The Cinema Museum of Rome is located in Cinecittà. The collections consist of movie posters and playbills, cine cameras, projectors, magic lanterns, stage costumes and the patent of Filoteo Alberini's "kinetograph". The Milan Cinema Museum, managed by the Cineteca Italiana, is divided into three sections, the precinema, animation cinema and "Milan as a film set", as well as multimedia and interactive stations.

The Catania Cinema Museum exhibits documents concerning cinema, its techniques and its history, with particular attention to the link between cinema and Sicily. The Cinema Museum of Syracuse collects more than 10,000 exhibits on display in 12 rooms.

== Italian Academy Award winners ==
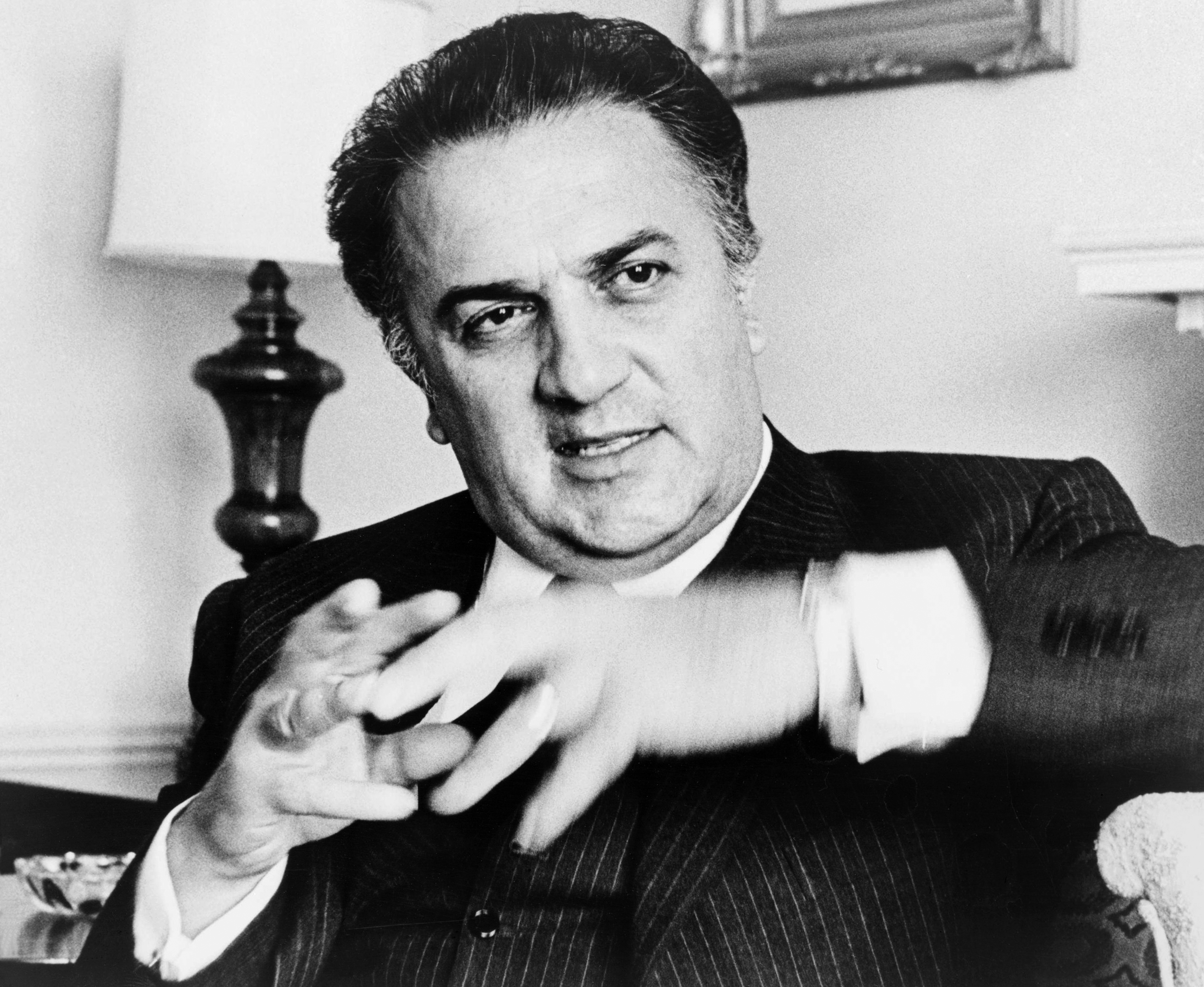
Federico Fellini has won four Oscars for Best Foreign Language Film, the most for any director in the history of the academy, and has had three other films submitted. He is considered one of the most influential and widely revered filmmakers in the history of cinema.

Italy is the most awarded country at the Academy Awards for Best Foreign Language Film, with 14 wins, 3 Special Awards and 31 nominations. Winners with the year of the ceremony:

- Shoeshine (1947), by Vittorio De Sica (Honorary Award)
- Bicycle Thieves (1949), by Vittorio De Sica (Honorary Award)
- The Walls of Malapaga (1950), by René Clément (Honorary Award)
- La Strada (1956), by Federico Fellini
- Nights of Cabiria (1957), by Federico Fellini
- 8½ (1963), by Federico Fellini
- Yesterday, Today and Tomorrow (1964), by Vittorio De Sica
- Investigation of a Citizen Above Suspicion (1970), by Elio Petri
- The Garden of the Finzi-Continis (1971), by Vittorio De Sica
- Amarcord (1973), by Federico Fellini
- Cinema Paradiso (1989), by Giuseppe Tornatore
- Mediterraneo (1992), by Gabriele Salvatores
- Life Is Beautiful (1998), by Roberto Benigni
- The Great Beauty (2013), by Paolo Sorrentino

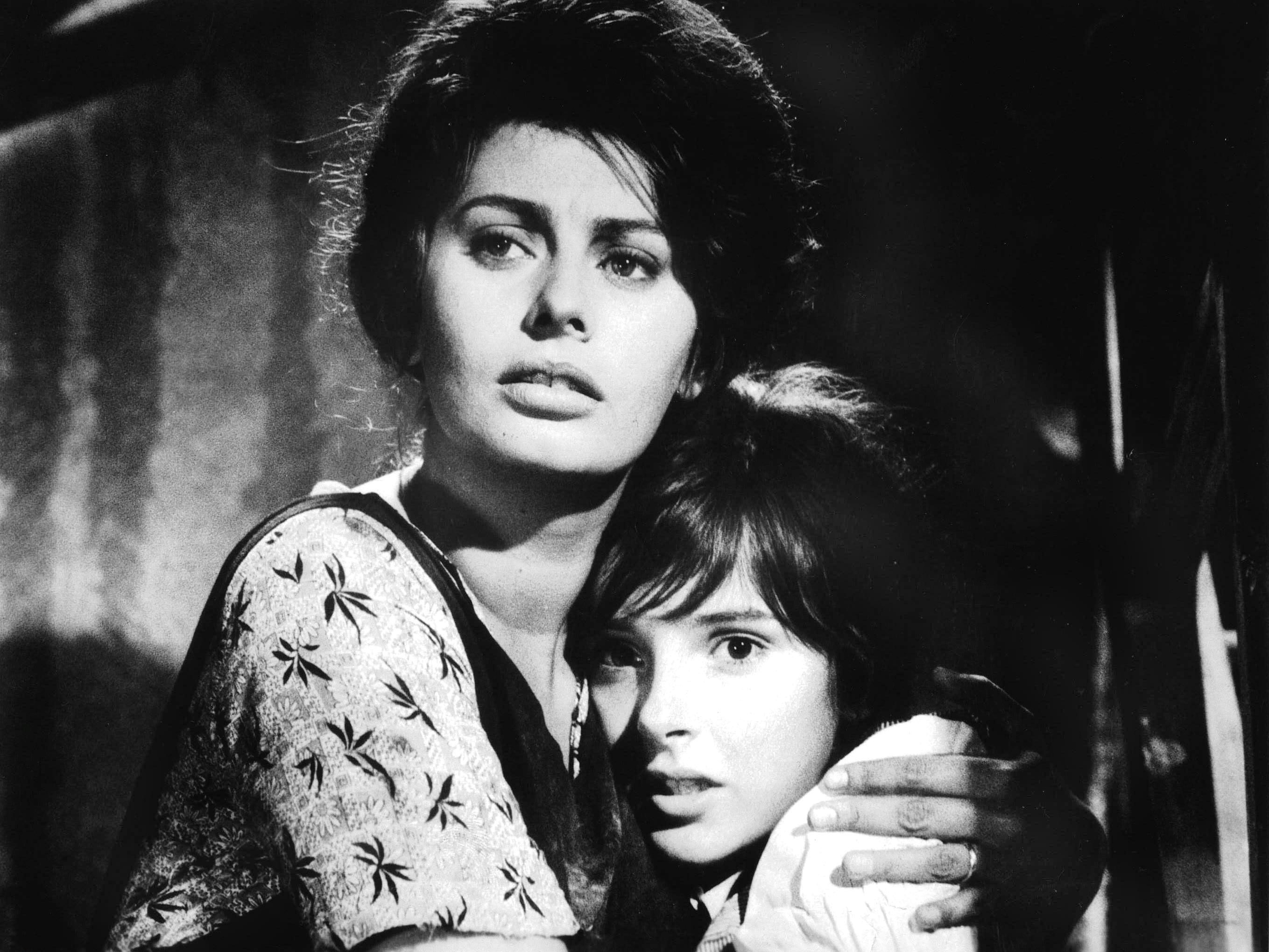
Sophia Loren and Eleonora Brown in Two Women by Vittorio De Sica (1960)

In 1961, Sophia Loren won the Academy Award for Best Actress for her role as a woman who is raped during World War II, along with her adolescent daughter, in Vittorio De Sica's Two Women. She was the first actress to win an Academy Award for a performance in any foreign language, and the second Italian leading lady Oscar-winner, after Anna Magnani for The Rose Tattoo. In 1998, Roberto Benigni was the first Italian actor to win the Best Actor for Life Is Beautiful.

Italian-born filmmaker Frank Capra won three times at the Academy Award for Best Director, for It Happened One Night, Mr. Deeds Goes to Town and You Can't Take It with You. Bernardo Bertolucci won the award for The Last Emperor, and also Best Adapted Screenplay for the same movie.

Ennio De Concini, Alfredo Giannetti and Pietro Germi won the award for Best Original Screenplay for Divorce Italian Style. The Academy Award for Best Film Editing was won by Gabriella Cristiani for The Last Emperor and by Pietro Scalia for JFK and Black Hawk Down.

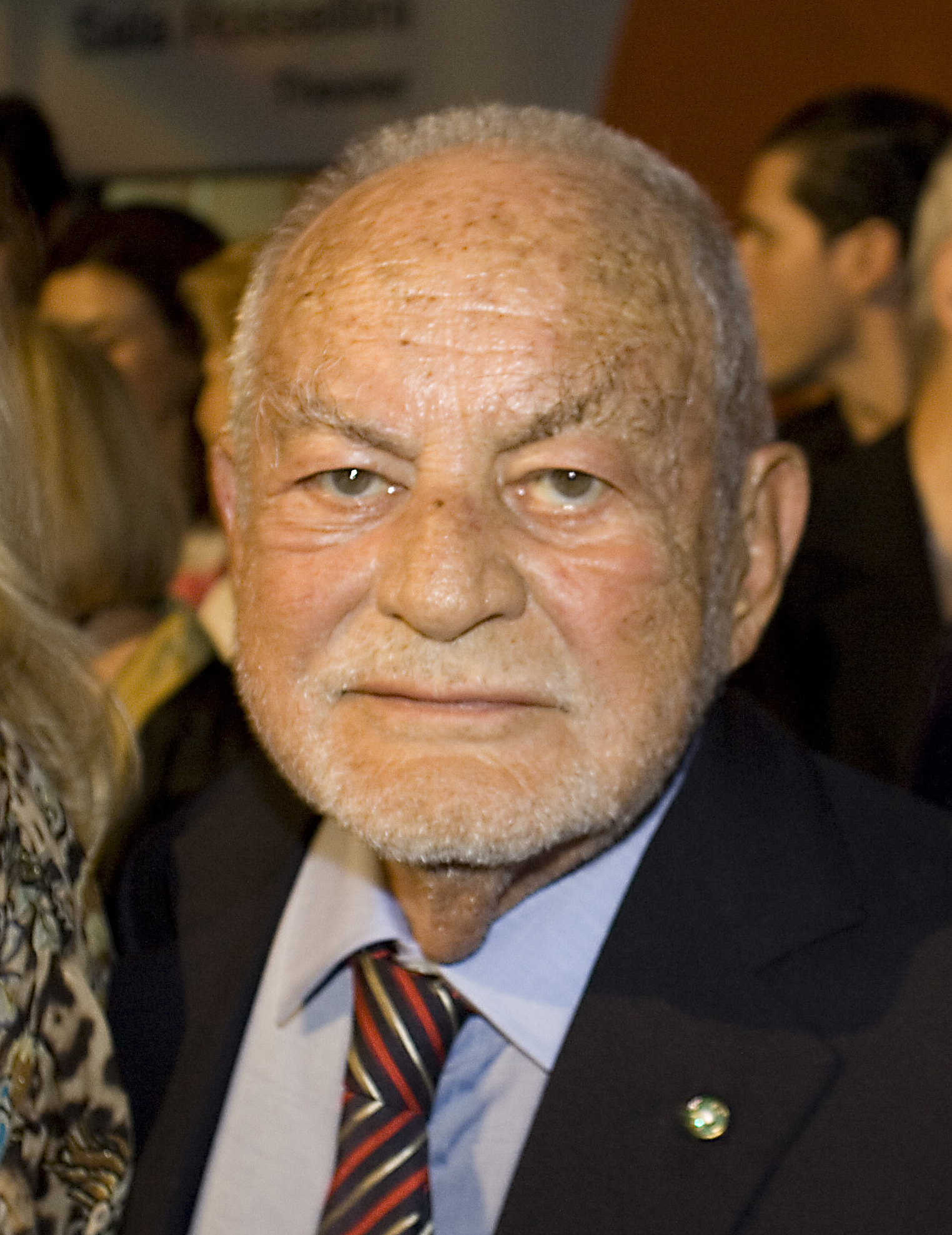
Dino De Laurentiis produced more than 500 films, of which 38 were nominated for Oscars.

The award for Best Original Score was won by Nino Rota for The Godfather Part II; Giorgio Moroder for Midnight Express; Nicola Piovani for Life is Beautiful; Dario Marianelli for Atonement; and Ennio Morricone for The Hateful Eight. Giorgio Moroder also won the award for Best Original Song for Flashdance and Top Gun.

The Italian winners at the Academy Award for Best Production Design are Dario Simoni for Lawrence of Arabia and Doctor Zhivago; Elio Altramura and Gianni Quaranta for A Room with a View; Bruno Cesari, Osvaldo Desideri and Ferdinando Scarfiotti for The Last Emperor; Luciana Arrighi for Howards End; and Dante Ferretti and Francesca Lo Schiavo for The Aviator, Sweeney Todd: The Demon Barber of Fleet Street and Hugo.

The winners at the Academy Award for Best Cinematography are: Tony Gaudio for Anthony Adverse; Pasqualino De Santis for Romeo and Juliet; Vittorio Storaro for Apocalypse Now, Reds and The Last Emperor; and Mauro Fiore for Avatar.

The winners at the Academy Award for Best Costume Design are Piero Gherardi for La dolce vita and 8½; Vittorio Nino Novarese for Cleopatra and Cromwell; Danilo Donati for The Taming of the Shrew, Romeo and Juliet, and Fellini's Casanova; Franca Squarciapino for Cyrano de Bergerac; Gabriella Pescucci for The Age of Innocence; and Milena Canonero for Barry Lyndon, Chariots of Fire, Marie Antoinette and The Grand Budapest Hotel.

Special effects artist Carlo Rambaldi won three Oscars: one Special Achievement Academy Award for Best Visual Effects for King Kong and two Academy Awards for Best Visual Effects for Alien (1979) and E.T. the Extra-Terrestrial. The Academy Award for Best Makeup and Hairstyling was won by Manlio Rocchetti for Driving Miss Daisy, and Alessandro Bertolazzi and Giorgio Gregorini for Suicide Squad.

Sophia Loren, Federico Fellini, Michelangelo Antonioni, Dino De Laurentiis, Ennio Morricone, and Piero Tosi also received the Academy Honorary Award.

== See also ==
- Media of Italy
- Cinema of the world
- History of cinema
- 100 Italian films to be saved
- List of actors from Italy
- List of actresses from Italy
- List of film directors from Italy
- List of Italian movies
- List of highest-grossing films in Italy

== Bibliography ==
- Bacon, Henry (1998). Visconti: Explorations of Beauty and Decay. Cambridge University Press. ISBN 978-0521599603.
- Bondanella, Peter (2002). The Films of Federico Fellini. Cambridge University Press. ISBN 0-521-57573-7.
- Bondanella, Peter (2002). Italian Cinema: From Neorealism to the Present. Continuum. ISBN 978-0826404268.
- Brunetta, Gian Piero (2009). The History of Italian Cinema: A Guide to Italian Film from Its Origins to the Twenty-First Century. Princeton University Press. ISBN 978-0691119892.
- Celli, Carlo; Cottino-Jones, Marga (2007). A New Guide to Italian Cinema. Palgrave MacMillan. ISBN 978-1403975607.
- Celli, Carlo (2013). "Italian Circularity". National Identity in Global Cinema: How Movies Explain the World. Palgrave MacMillan. pp. 83–98. ISBN 978-1137379023.
- Cherchi Usai, Paolo (1997). Italy: Spectacle and Melodrama. Oxford University Press. ISBN 978-0198742425.
- Clark, Martin (1984). Modern Italy 1871-1982. Longman. ISBN 978-0582483620.
- Forgacs, David; Lutton, Sarah; Nowell-Smith, Geoffrey (2000). Roberto Rossellini: Magician of the Real. London: BFI. ISBN 978-0851707952.
- Genovese, Nino; Gesù, Sebastiano (1996). Verga e il cinema. Con una sceneggiatura verghiana inedita di Cavalleria rusticana (in Italian). Giuseppe Maimone Editore. ISBN 978-8877510792.
- Gesù, Sebastiano; Maccarrone, Laura (2004). Ercole Patti: Un letterato al cinema (in Italian). Giuseppe Maimone Editore. ISBN 978-88-7751-211-6.
- Gesù, Sebastiano (2005). L'Etna nel cinema: Un vulcano di celluloide (in Italian). Giuseppe Maimone Editore. ISBN 978-8877512383.
- Gesù, Sebastiano; Russo, Elena (1995). Le Madonie, cinema ad alte quote (in Italian). Giuseppe Maimone Editore. ISBN 978-8877510907.
- Indiana, Gary (2000). Salo or The 120 Days of Sodom. London, BFI. ISBN 978-0851708072.
- Kemp, Philip (March 2002). "The Son's Room". Sight & Sound. No. 3. p. 56.
- Landy, Marcia (2000). Italian Film. Cambridge University Press. ISBN 978-0521649773.
- Mancini, Elaine (1985). Struggles of the Italian Film Industry during Fascism 1930-1935. UMI Press. ISBN 978-0835716550.
- Marcus, Millicent (1993). Filmmaking by the Book: Italian Cinema and Literary Adaptation. Johns Hopkins University Press. ISBN 978-0801844553.
- Marcus, Millicent (1986). Italian Film in the Light of Neorealism. Princeton University Press. ISBN 978-0691102085.
- Nowell-Smith, Geoffrey (2003). Luchino Visconti. British Film Institute. ISBN 978-0851709611.
- Reich, Jacqueline; Garofalo, Piero (2002). Re-viewing Fascism: Italian Cinema, 1922-1943. Indiana University Press. ISBN 978-0253215185.
- Reichardt, Dagmar; Bianchi, Alberto (2014). Letteratura e cinema (in Italian). Franco Cesati Editore. ISBN 978-88-7667-501-0.
- Rohdie, Sam (2002). Fellini Lexicon. London: BFI. ISBN 978-0851709338.
- Rohdie, Sam (2020). Rocco and his Brothers. London: BFI. ISBN 978-1839021947.
- Sitney, Adams (1995). Vital Crises in Italian Cinema. University of Texas Press. ISBN 0-292-77688-8.
- Sorlin, Pierre (1996). Italian National Cinema. London: Routledge. ISBN 978-0415116978.
- Wood, Michael (May 2003). "Death becomes Visconti". Sight & Sound. No. 5. pp. 24–27.
