= Little World of Don Camillo =

The Little World of Don Camillo
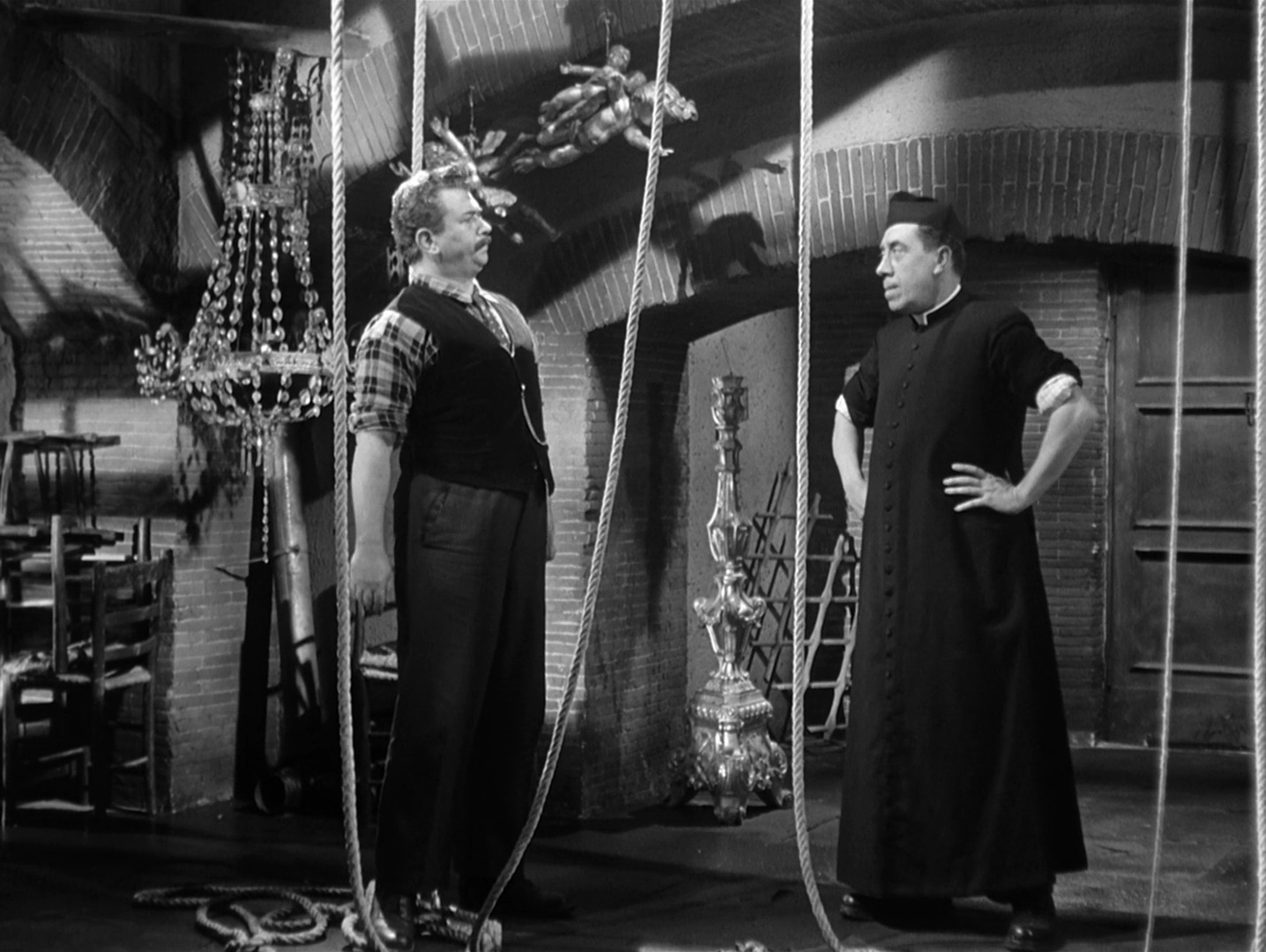
- Peppone (Gino Cervi) and Don Camillo (Fernandel)
- Directed by: Julien Duvivier
- Written by: Julien Duvivier; Oreste Biancoli; René Barjavel
- Based on: Don Camillo by Giovannino Guareschi
- Starring: Fernandel; Gino Cervi; Franco Interlenghi; Vera Talchi
- Cinematography: Nicolas Hayer
- Edited by: Maria Rosada
- Music by: Alessandro Cicognini
- Release date: 18 March 1952
- Running time: 107 min
- Countries: Italy; France
- Languages: Italian, French
- Box office: 13,215,653 admissions (Italy); 12,791,168 admissions (France)

The Little World of Don Camillo (Italian: Don Camillo; French: Le Petit Monde de don Camillo) is a 1952 French–Italian film directed by Julien Duvivier, starring Fernandel and Gino Cervi. It was the first film in the "Don Camillo" series, which made Fernandel an international star. The film was based on the novel Don Camillo by Italian author Giovannino Guareschi. It was followed in 1953 by The Return of Don Camillo, also directed by Duvivier.

In 2008, the film was included on the Italian Ministry of Cultural Heritage’s 100 Italian films to be saved, a list of 100 films that "have changed the collective memory of the country between 1942 and 1978."

== Synopsis ==
The story starts in a small [albeit unnamed] town, simply known as "a small world", in the Po lowlands of northern Italy, in the early summer of 1946. The town's Communists (which in the Italian dopoguerra -the Italian post-war period- are represented as the local section of a party analogous to the PCI) led by Peppone has just won the majority of seats within the local council, an event which they exploit for propaganda purposes – and with some non-vocal, but church bell-assisted protest by the outraged Don Camillo, the spiritual leader of the town's section of the Christian political party (likewise probable analogous to the Christian-Democrat DC party) – when an unexpected event puts an instant stop to this arising conflict: Peppone has just added a new member, a son, to his family, and following a personal and pugilistic appeal by Peppone himself (as well as some admonishment from Christ) to a reluctant Don Camillo, the child is baptized in Camillo's church. Similar conflicts arising in the course of the story are settled between Don Camillo and Peppone in a similarly conflicting, but ultimately unified fashion, such as:

- the erection of a kindergarten for the town after Don Camillo finds out that Peppone has used money stolen from the fascists during World War II to finance the construction of his new community hall, and blackmails him with this knowledge;
- a farmhand strike organized by the Communists to impose a special tax on the wealthier landowners in order to give the town's people work, resulting in the local cattle herds not getting milked until both Don Camillo and Peppone surreptitiously resolve the problem together;
- a river blessing procession and the funeral of the town's generally respected old teacher, Ms. Christina, which are both kept strictly non-political despite the Communists' initial intentions.

An important side story within the film is the Romeo and Juliet-esque relationship between a young girl named Gina Filotti, who has just returned to the town from boarding school as the story begins, and a young man named Mariolino Brusco. Gina and Mariolino's blossoming relationship, however, is off to a bad start: not only that the families of Gina (as Christians) and Mariolino (as Communists) are on ideologically opposite sides, they are also entertaining a long-running private feud. When their cause finds no support with neither Peppone as the mayor, nor with Camillo as a priest, the two lovers decide to commit a double suicide. Fortunately, both opposing parties come to their senses just in time, rescue the two and get the wedding underway. But during the combined wedding and house-warming festivities for the now-finished community hall and kindergarten, Don Camillo takes offense at one of Peppone's better throws at an Aunt Sally stall, which results in a public mass brawl.

Even though Peppone resents Don Camillo's interferences and their after-effects on personal health, he secretly enjoys their amicable quarrels and repeatedly tries his best to persuade the local bishop not to have Camillo replaced. However, with this last misdeed the bishop decides to send Camillo to a different community, and Peppone has threatened Camillo's parish not to say farewell to him as he is about to depart. But to his delightful surprise, Don Camillo does receive a touching goodbye from the people of his town – first from his parish at the train station next town, then from Peppone and his party comrades at the very next station afterward. Before Camillo departs for his new destination, Peppone asks him to come back soon and promises that Camillo's successor will not last long under his attention.

== Cast ==
- Fernandel as Don Camillo
- Gino Cervi as Giuseppe 'Peppone' Bottazzi
- Vera Talchi as Gina Filotti
- Franco Interlenghi as Mariolino Brusco
- Saro Urzì as Brusco
- Charles Vissière as the Bishop
- Leda Gloria as Signora Bottazzi
- Luciano Manara as Filotti
- Mario Siletti as Stiletti
- Marco Tulli as Smilzo
- Italo Clerici as the corrupt soccer referee
- Sylvie as Christina
- André Hildebrand as Barchini
- Orson Welles as Narrator (voice, English version)
- Jean Debucourt as voice of jesus

== Production notes ==
The film was produced by Francinex (Paris) and Rizzoli Amato (Rome). It belongs to a long series of Franco-Italian (or Italo-French) coproductions which provided hundreds of movies to the cinema during 30 years after World War II. In Le Petit Monde de Don Camillo (released in Italy as simply Don Camillo) one of the characteristics is a certain balance between the two countries, since the original author, the place of action, and one of the two stars are Italian, while the director, the screenwriters, and the first star are French. The crew and the rest of the cast are also equally divided between both nations.

During filming, the actors spoke their own language. So there are two originals, one Italian, and one French, in which the actors of the other language are dubbed.

== Reception ==
The film was the highest-grossing film in Italy of all time, and is currently the seventh most watched Italian film at the cinema with 13,215,653 admissions.

It was also the highest-grossing film in France of all time, and is currently the sixth most watched French film at the cinema with 12,791,168 admissions and the 17th most watched film in France.

== Sequel ==
The film had four sequels, thus totaling five films plus one unfinished due to Fernandel's sudden death:

- The Return of Don Camillo (Italian: Il ritorno di don Camillo ; French: Le Retour de don Camillo) (1953)
- Don Camillo's Last Round (Italian: Don Camillo e l'onorevole Peppone; French: La Grande Bagarre) (1955)
- Don Camillo: Monsignor (Italian: Don Camillo monsignore ma non troppo; French: Don Camillo Monseigneur) (1961)
- Don Camillo in Moscow (Italian: Il compagno don Camillo; French: Don Camillo en Russie) (1965)
- Don Camillo e i giovani d'oggi (French: Don Camillo et les contestataires; English translated: Don Camillo and the youth of today) (1970) (unfinished film)
