= The Return of Don Camillo =

1953 film

- Directed by: Julien Duvivier
- Written by: Giovannino Guareschi (story); René Barjavel; Julien Duvivier; Giuseppe Amato
- Produced by: Giuseppe Amato
- Starring: Fernandel; Gino Cervi; Édouard Delmont; Paolo Stoppa
- Narrated by: Emilio Cigoli
- Cinematography: Anchise Brizzi
- Edited by: Marthe Poncin
- Music by: Alessandro Cicognini
- Release date: 5 June 1953
- Running time: 115 minutes
- Countries: France; Italy
- Languages: French; Italian

The Return of Don Camillo (Italian: Il ritorno di Don Camillo; French: Le Retour de don Camillo) is a 1953 French-Italian comedy film directed by Julien Duvivier and starring Fernandel, Gino Cervi and Édouard Delmont. The film's sets were designed by Virgilio Marchi. It was the second of five films featuring Fernandel as the Italian priest Don Camillo and his struggles with Giuseppe 'Peppone' Bottazzi, the Communist Mayor of their rural town.

== Plot ==
Don Camillo is exiled to a remote and bleak mountain parish by his bishop at the request of Peppone, the Communist mayor of a small Po Valley town named Brescello. But the mayor develops problems with the citizens of the town, who want Camillo back as parish priest. In addition, a flood threatens to destroy Brescello and its environs. So Peppone calls back the priest, and he tries to raise the money needed to prevent damage from the imminent flood. However, delays occur and the flood devastates the area. Don Camillo insists on remaining in the town as the townspeople flee to safety, but the film ends on a heart-warming note as the sun breaks out heralding the end of the flood.

== Cast ==
- Fernandel as Don Camillo
- Gino Cervi as Giuseppe 'Peppone' Bottazzi
- Édouard Delmont as Dr Spiletti
- Paolo Stoppa as Marchetti
- Alexandre Rignault as Franceso 'Nero' Gallini
- Thomy Bourdelle as Cagnola
- Leda Gloria as Signora Bottazzi
- Charles Vissières as the Bishop
- Claudy Chapeland as Beppo Bottazzi
- Tony Jacquot as Don Pietro
- Saro Urzì as Brusco the barber
- Manuel Gary
- Lia Di Leo as the schoolmistress
- Marco Tulli as Lo Smilzo
- Arturo Bragaglia as the roadworker (who gives Don Camillo a lift on his motorbike)
- Enzo Staiola as Mario Cagnola
- Miranda Campa as Signora Spiletti

== Reception ==
It was the second most popular film of the year at the French box office in 1953.

== Sequel ==
- Don Camillo's Last Round (Italian: Don Camillo e l'onorevole Peppone; French: La Grande Bagarre) (1955)
- Don Camillo: Monsignor (Italian: Don Camillo monsignore ma non troppo; French: Don Camillo Monseigneur) (1961)
- Don Camillo in Moscow (Italian: Il compagno don Camillo; French: Don Camillo en Russie) (1965)
- Don Camillo e i giovani d'oggi (French: Don Camillo et les contestataires; English translated: Don Camillo and the youth of today) (1970) (unfinished film)

== Bibliography ==
- Moliterno, Gino. The A to Z of Italian Cinema. Scarecrow Press, 2009.
