= I'll Give a Million =

I'll Give a Million may refer to:

- I'll Give a Million (1935 film), an Italian comedy film
- I'll Give a Million (1938 film), an American romance film
