= Julien Duvivier =

French film director and screenwriter (1896–1967)

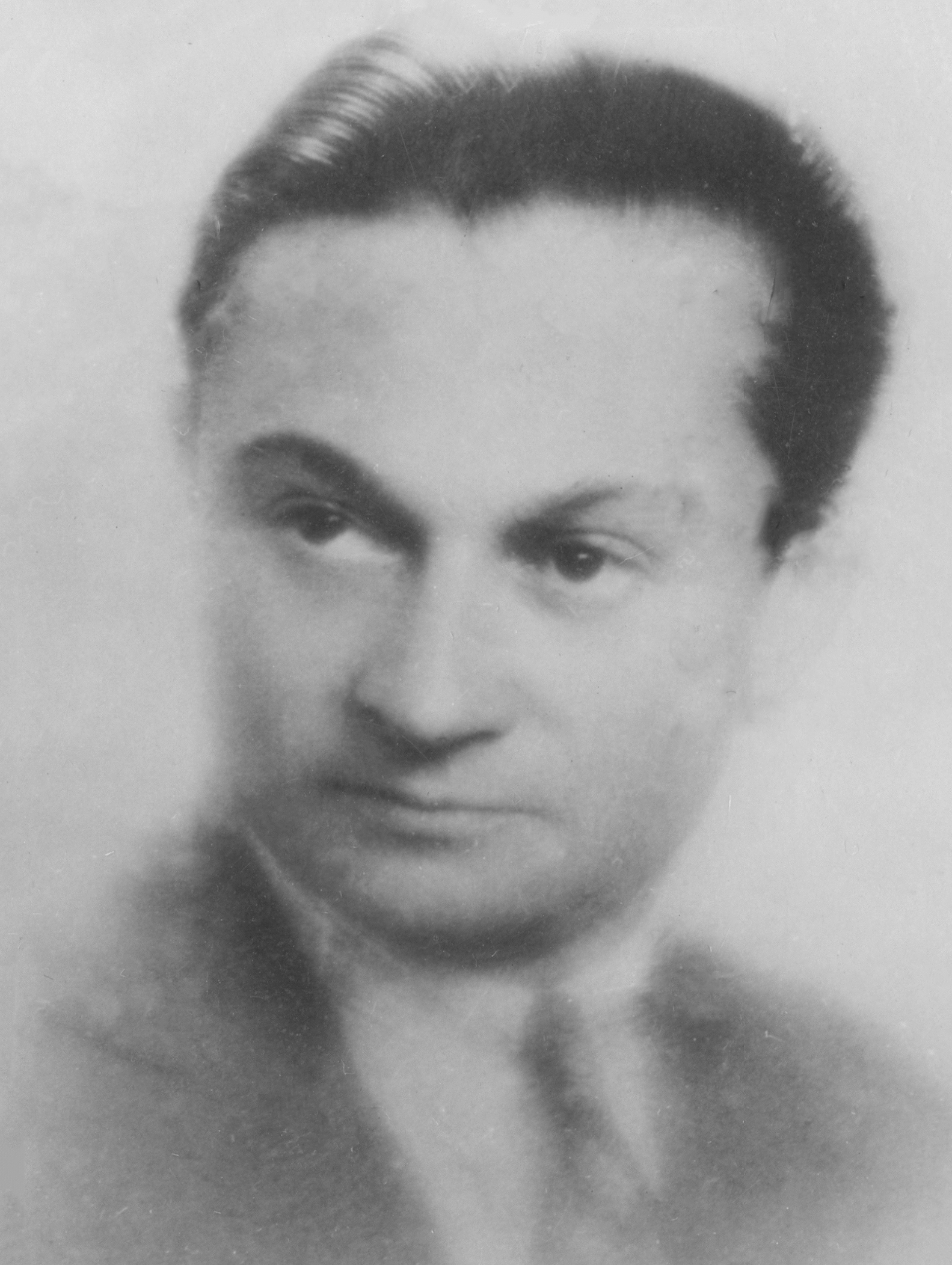
- Duvivier in 1932
- Born: 8 October 1896; Lille, France
- Died: 29 October 1967 (aged 71); Paris, France
- Occupations: Film director; screenwriter
- Years active: 1919–1967

Julien Duvivier (French: [ʒyljɛ̃ dyvivje]; 8 October 1896 – 29 October 1967) was a French film director and screenwriter. He was prominent in French cinema in the years 1930–1960. Amongst his most original films, chiefly notable are La Bandera, Pépé le Moko, Little World of Don Camillo, Panic (Panique), Deadlier Than the Male and Marianne de ma jeunesse.

Jean Renoir called him, a "great technician, [a] rigorist, a poet".

== Early years ==
Duvivier's career began as an actor, in 1916 at the Théâtre de l'Odéon under the direction of André Antoine. In 1918 he moved on to Gaumont, as a writer and assistant of, amongst others, André Antoine, Louis Feuillade and Marcel L'Herbier. In 1919 he directed his first film. In the 1920s several of his films had a religious concern: Credo ou la Tragédie de Lourdes, L'abbé Constantin and La Vie miraculeuse de Thérèse Martin — a film about the Carmelite saint Thérèse of Lisieux.

== The 1930s ==
In the 1930s Duvivier was part of the production company, 'Film d'Art', founded by Marcel Vandal and Charles Delac and he worked as part of a team. He stayed with them for nine years. David Golder (1930), was his first success. It was also his first 'talkie', as it was of the actor Harry Baur. They worked together many more times in the 1930s. In 1934 Duvivier collaborated with Jean Gabin for the first time in the film Maria Chapdelaine, while for La Bandera (1935), he availed himself of the writing talent of Charles Spaak, who had previously worked with Jacques Feyder, Jean Grémillon, Marc Allégret and Marcel L'Herbier. They too would work together many times from this point onwards. Having made Le Golem (1936), a remake of an earlier German horror film, Duvivier set out on La belle équipe (also 1936), with Jean Gabin, Charles Vanel and Raymond Aimos. The film remains a significant example of his work. L'Homme du jour (1936), with Maurice Chevalier in the lead role is a minor item in the director's canon but Pépé le Moko and Un Carnet de Bal (both 1937) are his greatest works.

Pépé le Moko, which plunges into the midst of the gangster underworld and which had the Casbah (Arab quarter) of Algiers for exotic backdrop, was the film which propelled Jean Gabin into the category of an international star. In 1938 Duvivier signed a contract with MGM and made his first American film, a biopic of Johann Strauss, The Great Waltz. The next year, back in France, he made La Fin du jour, in which theatre actors in retirement struggle to see that their retirement home remains open. La Charrette fantôme followed, a horror film adapted from a novel by Selma Lagerlöf. In 1940 Untel père et fils, a family history starring Raimu, Michèle Morgan, and Louis Jouvet, was not able to be shown — because of the political situation — until the end of the war, at least in France. It is generally considered a minor work, and even a failure.

== World War II, his American period ==
During World War II, Duvivier left to work in the United States. There he directed several movies: Lydia (1941); two anthology films, Tales of Manhattan (1942) with Charles Boyer and Rita Hayworth among leading actors, and Flesh and Fantasy (1943) with Edward G. Robinson, Charles Boyer and Barbara Stanwyck; The Impostor (1944), again with Jean Gabin; and Destiny (also 1944), a Reginald LeBorg directed film which was built around a cut thirty-minute sequence from Flesh and Fantasy (Duvivier was uncredited).

== After the war ==
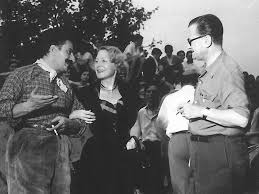
Julien Duvivier, on the right, with Italian writer Giovannino Guareschi, 1952

On his return to France, Duvivier experienced some difficulties in resuming his career. Panic (Panique) (1946), an exhaustive summary of the lowest of human instincts, was the most personal, darkest, and nihilistic of his works. It was a bitter failure with critics and the public. Duvivier continued, notwithstanding, to work in France until the end of his life, apart from a short period in Great Britain to shoot Anna Karenina (1948) and in Spain for Black Jack (1950).

Under the Sky of Paris (1951) is a highly original film in the way the film was cut. In the course of a day in Paris, one follows people whose paths will cross. The same year Duvivier shot the first of the humorous Don Camillo films from the Giovannino Guareschi books, Le Petit monde de Don Camillo. It met with immediate popular success and he followed its success with The Return of Don Camillo (1953). The series continued with other directors.

In Deadlier Than the Male (1956), Jean Gabin plays a decent restaurateur in Les Halles who is swindled by a cynical young woman, Catherine, (Danièle Delorme). Duvivier co-wrote and directed two films in 1957: the drama Lovers of Paris (starring Gérard Philipe) and the comedy-thriller The Man in the Raincoat (starring Fernandel and Bernard Blier).

Marie-Octobre (1959) followed, featuring Danielle Darrieux, Serge Reggiani, and Bernard Blier amongst others. It was an exercise in style; 11 people, nine men, two women, and a mise en scène that followed the unities of time, place, and action, it had a constant concern for the framing of the composition to reinforce an inquisitorial, menacing atmosphere. The same year he was invited to be part of the jury of the Cannes Film Festival, 1959, the year the French New Wave fully emerged. Duvivier's final portmanteau film was Le Diable et les dix Commandements (1962), while the scenario of Chair de poule (1963) has a resemblance to The Postman Always Rings Twice and again features an unscrupulous woman.

In the fall of 1967, just as the production of Diaboliquement vôtre reached completion, a film about a man made amnesiac following a car accident, Duvivier was in a traffic accident, triggering a heart attack which killed him. He was 71; he left behind a filmography comprising nearly 70 films. He is buried in the cemetery of Rueil-Malmaison in the Hauts-de-Seine.

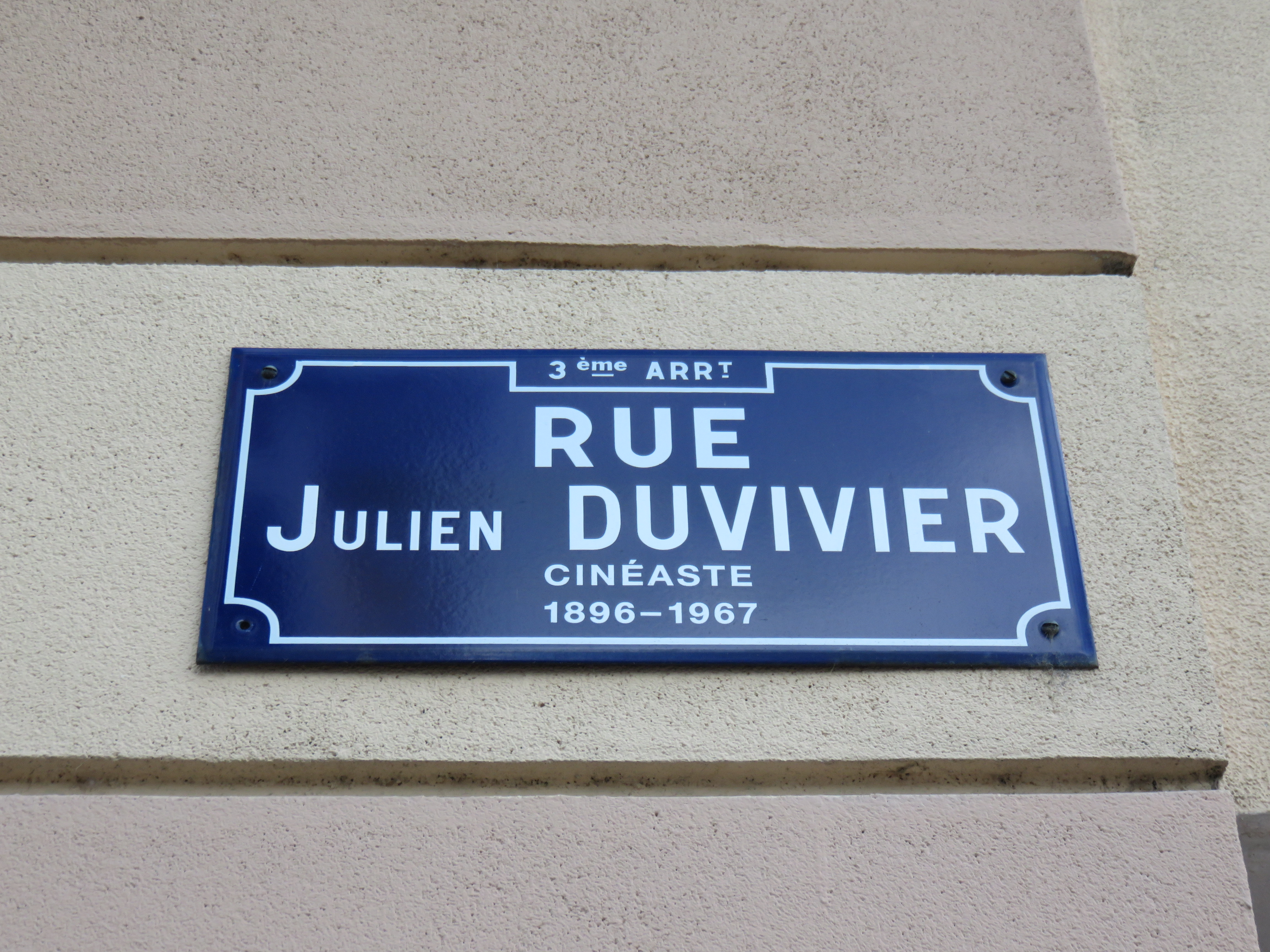
Rue Julien Duvivier in the 3rd arrondissement of Lyon
