= Don Camillo's Last Round =

- Directed by: Carmine Gallone
- Written by: Giovannino Guareschi (novel); Age & Scarpelli; Giovannino Guareschi; Leo Benvenuti; Piero De Bernardi; René Barjavel
- Produced by: Angelo Rizzoli
- Starring: Gino Cervi; Fernandel; Leda Gloria
- Cinematography: Anchise Brizzi
- Edited by: Niccolò Lazzari
- Music by: Alessandro Cicognini
- Production company: Rizzoli Film
- Distributed by: Cineriz; Cinédis
- Release date: 30 September 1955
- Running time: 97 minutes
- Countries: France; Italy
- Language: Italian

Don Camillo's Last Round (French: La grande bagarre de Don Camillo, Italian: Don Camillo e l'onorevole Peppone) is a 1955 French-Italian comedy film directed by Carmine Gallone and starring Fernandel, Gino Cervi and Leda Gloria. It was the third of five films featuring Fernandel as the Italian priest Don Camillo and his struggles with Giuseppe "Peppone" Bottazzi, the Communist mayor of their rural town. The film had 5,087,231 admissions in France.

It was shot at the Cinecittà Studios in Rome and on location in Boretto and Brescello in Emilia-Romagna. The film's sets were designed by the art director Virgilio Marchi.

== Plot ==
In the small town of Brescello, skirmishes are continuing between the parish priest Don Camillo and the Communist mayor Peppone Bottazzi. After staging a theft of Don Camillo's prized chickens in retribution for a political prank pulled by the priest, Peppone decides to enter the big time of politics by standing for national senator. Peppone has been assisted by a winsome young lady comrade sent from the big city to assist him, but the mayor's wife – suspecting more – complains to Don Camillo, who endeavours to remedy the threatened domestic breakdown. Peppone must the fifth grade exam, the elementary school leaving exam ("abolished" in 2003–2004).

== Cast ==
- Fernandel as Don Camillo
- Gino Cervi as Giuseppe 'Peppone' Bottazzi
- Claude Sylvain as Clotilde
- Leda Gloria as La signora Bottazzi, moglie di Peppone
- Umberto Spadaro as Bezzi
- Memmo Carotenuto as Lo Spiccio
- Saro Urzì as Brusco, il parucchiere
- Guido Celano as Il maresciallo
- Luigi Tosi as Il prefetto
- Marco Tulli as Lo Smilzo
- Giovanni Onorato as Il Lungo

== Sequel ==
- Don Camillo: Monsignor (Italian: Don Camillo monsignore ma non troppo; French: Don Camillo Monseigneur) (1961)
- Don Camillo in Moscow (Italian: Il compagno don Camillo; French: Don Camillo en Russie) (1965)
- Don Camillo e i giovani d'oggi (French: Don Camillo et ses contestataires; English translated: Don Camillo and the youth of today) (1970) (unfinished film)
