= Mondaini =

Mondaini is an Italian surname, probably originating from the town of Mondaino, Romagna. Notable people with the surname include:

- Giacinto Mondaini (1902–1979), Italian painter, cartoonist, illustrator, humourist and screenwriter
- Marcos Mondaini (born 1985), Argentine footballer
- Sandra Mondaini (1931–2010), Italian actress, comedian and television presenter
