= The World of Don Camillo =

- Directed by: Terence Hill
- Written by: Giovannino Guareschi; Lori Hill
- Produced by: Terence Hill
- Starring: Terence Hill; Colin Blakely
- Cinematography: Franco Di Giacomo
- Edited by: Jack Fitzstephens; Camilla Toniolo
- Music by: Pino Donaggio
- Release date: 1983
- Running time: 126 minutes
- Country: Italy
- Languages: Italian; English

The World of Don Camillo (in Italy Don Camillo) is a 1983 Italian comedy film directed, produced and starring Terence Hill, and is a remake of Le Petit Monde de Don Camillo (1952). Both were based on the novel Don Camillo by Italian author Giovannino Guareschi.

== Production ==
Filming in the Po Valley lasted 5 months. Colin Blakely returned from the shoot one stone heavier, telling journalists that the region had the "best food in Italy".

== Plot ==
In a small village in Lombardy, the parish priest Don Camillo repeatedly collides with the communist mayor Peppone. The two do not share anything in common and the slights are continuous, at some times coming to blows with one another. Don Camillo coaches the football team of young boys of the village, and the day of the final match is near. Peppone however, to make a joke in bad taste to the enemy, corrupts the referee. Don Camillo realizes it and fights again with him; so Don Camillo is exiled. But the citizens of the village do not agree, and so Peppone is forced to make up for betraying their confidence in the government.

== Cast ==
- Terence Hill: Don Camillo
- Colin Blakely: Peppone
- Mimsy Farmer: Jo Magro
- Lew Ayres: Doc
- Cyril Cusack: Bishop
- Sam Whipple: Gigio
- Andy Luotto: Smilzo
- Allan Arbus: Jesus (voice)
- Joseph Ragno: Brusco
- Jennifer Hingel: Lilly
- Ross Hill: Magrino
- Franco Diogene: Binella
- Roberto Boninsegna: Angels player
- Roberto Pruzzo: Devils player
- Luciano Spinosi: Devils player
- Carlo Ancelotti: Devils player
