= Don Camillo: Monsignor =

- French: Don Camillo Monseigneur
- Italian: Don Camillo monsignore... ma non troppo
- Directed by: Carmine Gallone
- Written by: Giovannino Guareschi (novel); Leo Benvenuti; Piero De Bernardi; Carmine Gallone
- Produced by: Angelo Rizzoli
- Starring: Fernandel; Gino Cervi; Saro Urzì
- Cinematography: Carlo Carlini
- Edited by: Niccolò Lazzari
- Music by: Alessandro Cicognini
- Release date: 7 October 1961
- Running time: 117 min
- Countries: Italy; France
- Language: Italian

Don Camillo: Monsignor (French: Don Camillo Monseigneur; Italian: Don Camillo monsignore... ma non troppo, lit. 'Don Camillo, a Monsignor... but Not Too Much') is a 1961 French-Italian comedy film directed by Carmine Gallone, starring Fernandel and Gino Cervi. It was the fourth of five films featuring Fernandel as the Italian priest Don Camillo and his struggles with Giuseppe "Peppone" Bottazzi, the Communist mayor of their rural town. In this instalment, Don Camillo has become a monsignor and Peppone a senator.

== Plot summary ==
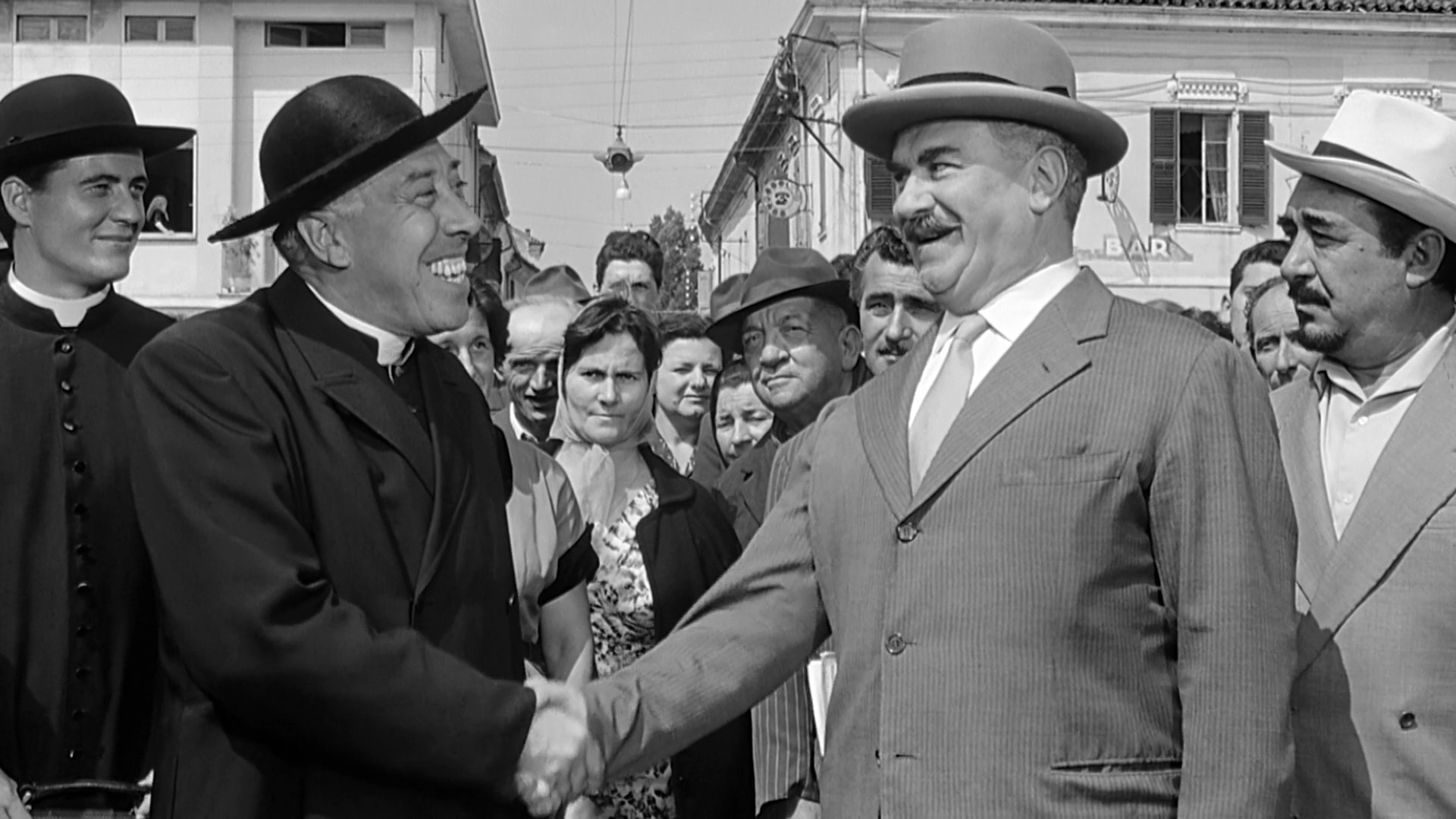
Scene from the film

In Brescello, Don Camillo and Peppone have left for Rome, after yet another battle royal. Don Camillo has become monsignor, while Peppone has become a national senator. Both retain their pure and provincial spirit, not suitable to the crude realities of the city, and so they both contrive to return to Brescello. While Don Camillo is planning – in secret – the wedding in a Catholic ceremony of the son of Peppone, the mayor tries to bribe the bride's father to undergo a civil wedding. Don Camillo responds with a proposed deal on the sale of a gas station. Since Peppone, being a Communist, cannot be seen to deal with money, having won the Italian football pools, he decides to hide the ticket. Don Camillo unmasks him, and the two return to fight, as they prepare once again to leave for Rome.

== Cast ==
- Fernandel as Don Camillo
- Gino Cervi as Giuseppe "Peppone" Bottazzi
- Leda Gloria as Maria Bottazzi, Peppone's wife
- Gina Rovere as Gisella Marasca
- Valeria Ciangottini as Rosetta Grotti
- Saro Urzì as Brusco, the mayor
- Marco Tulli as Smilzo
- Andrea Checchi as the Roman Communist representative
- Emma Gramatica as Desolina, the old lady
- Karl Zoff as Walter "Lenin" Bottazzi, Peppone's son
- Ruggero De Daninos as Don Camillo's secretary
- Carlo Taranto as Marasca, Gisella's husband
- Armando Bandini as Don Carlino
- Giuseppe Porelli as Doctor Galluzzi
- Andrea Scotti as the leader of the "Athletic Youth"

== Sequel ==
- Don Camillo in Moscow (Italian: Il compagno don Camillo; French: Don Camillo en Russie) – 1965
- Don Camillo and the Youth of Today (Italian: Don Camillo e i giovani d'oggi; French: Don Camillo et les Contestataires) – 1970, unfinished
