= I'll Give a Million (1938 film) =

1938 film

- Directed by: Walter Lang
- Written by: Boris Ingster; Milton Sperling
- Story by: Giaci Mondaini; Cesare Zavattini
- Produced by: Darryl F. Zanuck
- Starring: Warner Baxter; Marjorie Weaver; Peter Lorre
- Cinematography: Lucien N. Andriot
- Edited by: Louis R. Loeffler
- Music by: Cyril Mockridge
- Production company: 20th Century Fox
- Distributed by: 20th Century Fox
- Release date: July 22, 1938
- Running time: 70 minutes
- Country: United States
- Language: English

I'll Give a Million is a 1938 American romantic comedy film directed by Walter Lang and starring Warner Baxter, Marjorie Weaver and Peter Lorre. It is a remake of the Italian film I'll Give a Million (1935).

== Plot ==
In the south of France, wealthy American businessman Tony Newlander is fed up with life. It seems everyone is friendly with him only because of his money or influence, including his ex-wife Cecilia and his valet.

While on his yacht, he spots Louie, a tramp drowning in the water. Unable to attract the crew's attention over the sound of the ship's whistle, Tony jumps in to rescue him. The yacht sails away, so Tony drags a strangely uncooperative Louie ashore. It turns out that Louie was trying to commit suicide. However, since he has been saved, he desists from trying again. Louie takes him to his shack on the beach.

The next morning, the tramp discovers that Tony has taken Louie's clothes and left his tuxedo and money behind in exchange. Louie dresses up in his new finery and goes to a cafe for breakfast. The proprietor thinks he stole the money he flashes. Louie insists that an eccentric millionaire, dressed like a tramp, gave him a million francs and will do the same to anyone who is kind to him in his disguise. A reporter publishes his story, and soon everyone is being extra generous to anybody who looks down on his luck.

Meanwhile, Tony encounters a mischievous chimpanzee named Darwin. Jean Hofmann, a performer at the Circus Primerose, enlists Tony to capture Darwin. The chimp indulges in a favorite pastime, setting off a fire alarm. Tony is blamed for the rash of phony alarms, taken into custody and sentenced to ten days in jail. However, after the judge reads the newspaper article, he lets Tony go.

Tony flips a borrowed coin, which sends him to the circus. Jean gets Anatole Primerose, the proprietor, to give him a job as a relief night watchman.

Meanwhile, tramps flood the region to take advantage of the situation. Soon there are complaints, and the newspaper editor is pressured to either produce the millionaire or retract the story. He in turn threatens to accuse Louie of murdering the millionaire and stealing his money and gives him one last chance to find the man. The police round up all the tramps in town for Louie to look over.

Tony and Jean start falling in love, but to stop Max, the jealous son of the proprietor, from getting Tony fired, Jean lies (so she thinks) and tells him she is being friendly to Tony only because he is the millionaire. Unfortunately, Tony overhears her.

To save himself from a possible charge of murder, Louie identifies a tramp at random as the millionaire: Kopelpeck. Disillusioned, Tony decides to end the charade and expose the imposter, but no one will believe him. In fact, he is thrown in jail for making a nuisance of himself. Jean bails him out. Then Tony discovers that Jean does not believe he is the millionaire. His identity is finally confirmed by the captain of his yacht and others. The public surrounds the police station, demanding to be compensated for their misguided efforts. To prevent a riot, Tony agrees to donate half a million to the poor and the same amount to the city, but only if Jean will marry him. She holds out for a while, but then gives in.

== Cast ==
- Warner Baxter as Tony Newlander
- Marjorie Weaver as Jean Hofmann
- Peter Lorre as Louie 'The Dope' Monteau
- Jean Hersholt as Victor
- John Carradine as Kopelpeck
- J. Edward Bromberg as Editor
- Lynn Bari as Cecelia
- Fritz Feld as Max Primerose
- Sig Ruman as Anatole Primerose
- Christian Rub as Commissionaire
- Paul Harvey as Corcoran
- Charles Halton as Mayor
- Frank Reicher as Prefect of Police
- Frank Dawson as Albert
- Harry Hayden as Gilman
- Stanley Andrews as Captain
- Lillian Porter as Flower Girl
- Luis Alberni as Reporter
- Rafaela Ottiano as Proprietress
- Georges Renavent as Gendarme
- Rolfe Sedan as Telegraph Clerk
- Eddie Conrad as Proprietor of Pastry Shop
- Egon Brecher as Citizen
- Frank Puglia as Citizen
- Michael Visaroff as Citizen
- Alex Novinsky as Citizen
- Armand Kaliz as Hotel Manager

== Reception ==
The film was described as amusing but faltering. The ratings magazine Boxoffice recorded the film as underperforming an average 1938 box office (92% for Million vs 100% on average).
