= I'll Give a Million (1935 film) =

1936 film

- Vittorio De Sica and Gemma Bolognesi
- Directed by: Mario Camerini
- Written by: Mario Camerini; Giaci Mondaini; Ivo Perilli; Cesare Zavattini
- Produced by: Angelo Rizzoli
- Starring: Vittorio De Sica; Assia Noris; Luigi Almirante
- Cinematography: Otello Martelli
- Edited by: Fernando Tropea
- Music by: Gian Luca Tocchi
- Production company: Novella Film
- Release date: 30 August 1935
- Running time: 79 minutes
- Country: Italy
- Language: Italian

I'll Give a Million (Italian: Darò un milione) is a 1935 Italian "white-telephones" comedy film directed by Mario Camerini and starring Vittorio De Sica. It is based on the first screenplay by Cesare Zavattini which tells the story of a disillusioned millionaire who, tired of the attempts of greedy friends and relatives to sponge off of him, becomes a bum in order to find a decent human being. It had an American remake in 1938, again titled I'll Give a Million and starring Warner Baxter as the millionaire.

It was shot at the Cines Studios in Rome.

== Plot ==
A millionaire is about to commit suicide by leaping off of his yacht into the sea. He is just about to go when he spies a bum attempting suicide himself. The rich man saves the bum and tells him of his frustration with his friends and relatives who are always seeking a handout. He then claims that he will give a million francs to the first person to treat him kindly without thinking about his wealth. The next day, the tramp awakens to find the millionaire gone, and that his own tattered rags have been replaced by the finest clothing, along with a large roll of francs. The bum then begins circulating the millionaire's story around the town. As a result, people all over the country begin treating the homeless with kindness and respect. Eventually the disguised millionaire meets and marries a circus performer and donates his million francs to the whole community.

== Cast ==
- Vittorio De Sica as Gold
- Assia Noris as Anna
- Luigi Almirante as Blim
- Mario Gallina as Cavalier Primerose
- Franco Coop as Il banditore
- Gemma Bolognesi as Maria
- Cesare Zoppetti as Fake millionaire
