= Martinitt =

The name Martinitt refers to a historical boy orphanage of Milan, Italy, that was established in the 16th Century, now part of Pio Albergo Trivulzio, a public Milanese institution that provides aid to needy orphans, elders and other people experiencing social difficulties. The name comes from Saint Martin, as the orphanage was originally based in the eponymous oratory. The orphan boys themselves were thus referred to as Martinitt, a plural of Martinett ("little Martin") in Lombard language. The Martinitt played an important role in the history of Milan, most notably in the Five Days of Milan.

== History ==
The Martinitt orphanage was founded by Gerolamo Emiliani, who had previously created an orphanage for the poor in Venice. In 1528, Duke Francesco II Sforza of Milan decided to transfer to Emiliani the oratory of Saint Martin, located in the very centre of Milan (now Via Manzoni), to be used as Milan's orphanage. Federico Borromeo later decided to give out another building, the "Spedale dei Mendicanti" ("beggars' hospital"), which was used for orphan girls. The orphan boys were called Martinitt, while the orphan girls were called Stelline.

In 1776, Empress Maria Theresa moved the orphanage to Gessate, east of Milan. At the same time, it was decided that the orphans would be housed in the orphanage until the age of 18, and that they would be taught a job.

In 1796, when Napoleone Bonaparte conquered Milan, he transformed the orphanage in a military hospital. The Martinitt then moved again, first in some buildings in Brera, then in an abandoned convent, and finally (1803) back to their original seat in Via Manzoni. In 1848, during the Five Days of Milan (when the Milanese population rebelled against the Austrian rule), the Martinitt contributed to the success of the Milanese serving as couriers, bringing dispatches from barricade to barricade.

In 1932, a new seat for the Martinitt was established by Benito Mussolini in Via Pitteri, near Lambrate.

Today, the Martinitt (and the Stelline orphanage for girls) have merged into a wider social care institution called Pio Albergo Trivulzio. A museum dedicated to the history of the Martinitt and the Stelline has been established in 2009 in Corso Magenta 57, in the building next to the "Stelline Palace" (the original seat of the Stelline orphanage).

== Notable Martinitt orphans ==
- Angelo Rizzoli, founder of RCS MediaGroup, one of Italy's prominent publishing houses
- Leonardo Del Vecchio, founder of Luxottica, the world's largest eyewear company
- Edoardo Bianchi, founder of Bianchi Bicycles, a pioneering bicycle-making factory
