= Pio Albergo Trivulzio =

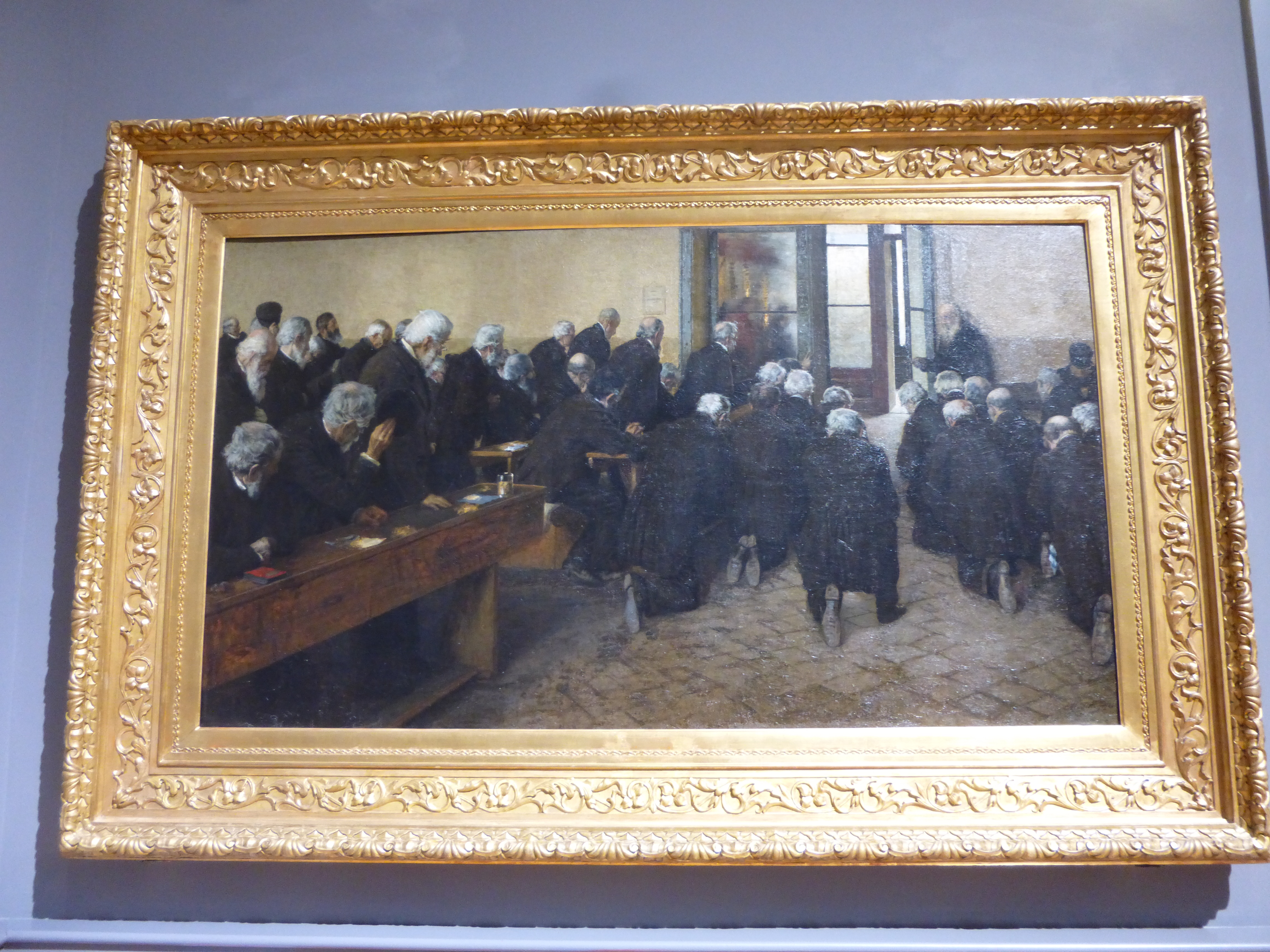

Geography
- Location: Milan, Italy
- Coordinates: 45.4653°N 9.1450°E

Organisation
- Type: Retirement home and hospital
- Patron: Tolomeo Trivulzio

History
- Former names: Azienda di servizi alla persona Istituti Milanesi Martinitt e Stelline e Pio Albergo Trivulzio, Baggina
- Opened: 1766

Links
- Website: www.iltrivulzio.it
- Lists: Hospitals in Italy

The Pio Albergo Trivulzio, formally Azienda di servizi alla persona Istituti Milanesi Martinitt e Stelline e Pio Albergo Trivulzio, commonly referred to as Baggina, is an ancient retirement home and hospital in Milan, Italy. Still active today, it dates back to 1766.

== History ==
In 1766, the Milanese aristocrat Tolomeo Trivulzio, at his death, devolved his belongings to the foundation of a shelter for the "poor old", to be housed in his own palace in the Verziere district (Via della Signora). The hospital began functioning in 1768, and later became part of a larger charity association which also included the two main traditional orphanages of Milan, that of the Martinitt (for orphan boys) and that of the Stelline (orphanage) for orphan girls.

In the early 20th century the Trivulzio was relocated on the road connecting Milan to Baggio, and was thereafter nicknamed "the Baggina".

In 1992, the Trivulzio received much media attention as a consequence of the Tangentopoli political scandal, as its president Mario Chiesa was the first politician to be arrested in the Mani Pulite trial.

== References in popular culture ==
Due to its longevity, the "Baggina" is well known to the Milanese population and referred to in Milanese pop culture and folklore, e.g., in a number of Milanese dialectal idioms (for example, sun bun per la Baggina, "I'm good for the Baggina", meaning "I'm old"). Singer-songwriter Fabrizio De André mentioned "Il poeta della Baggina" ("The poet from the Baggina") in his song La domenica delle salme, included in 1990's album Le Nuvole.
