= Candido (magazine) =

Weekly satirical magazine in Italy (1945–1961)

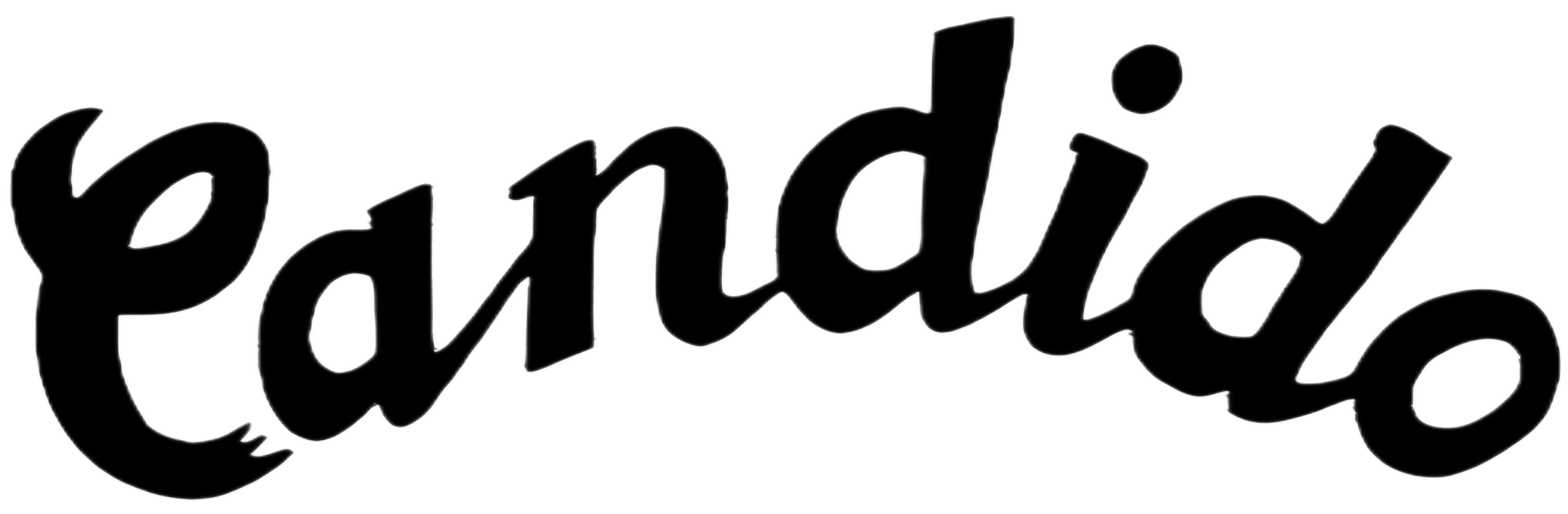

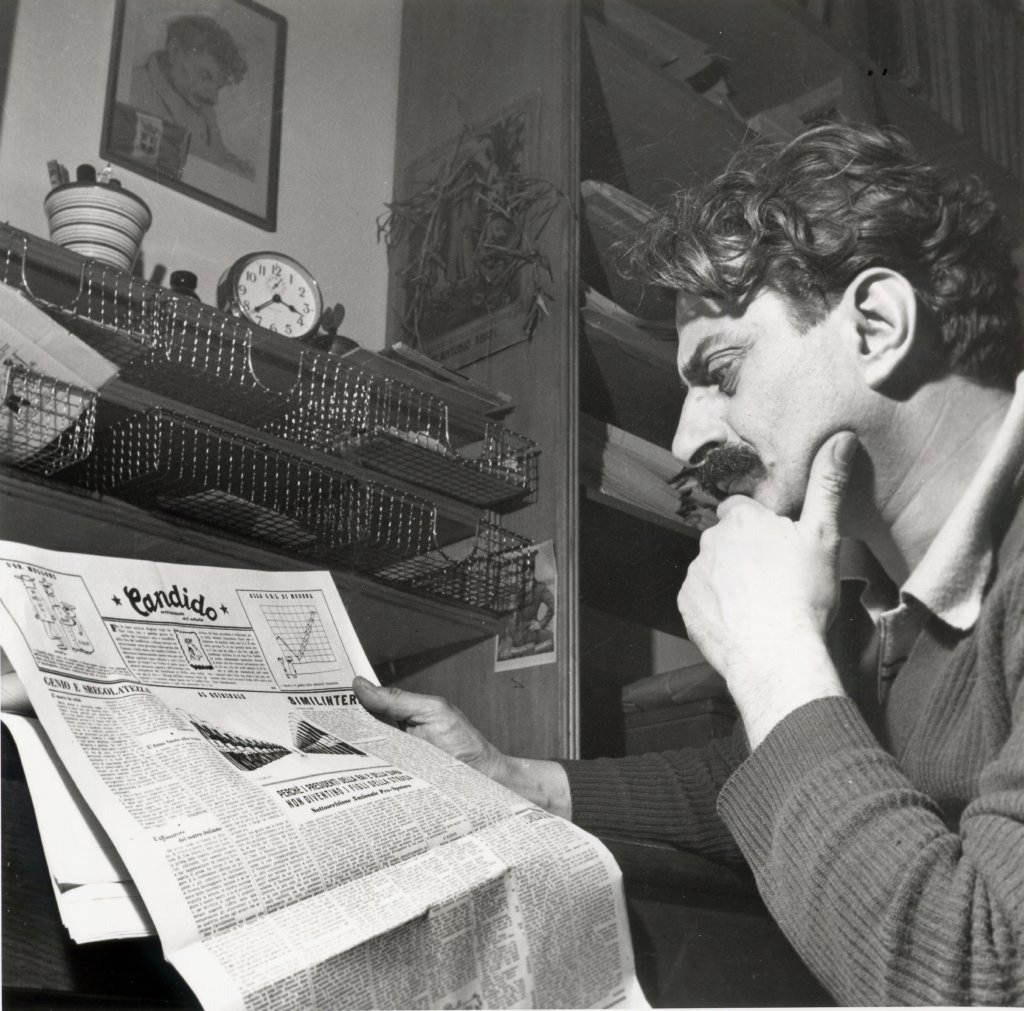
- Giovannino Guareschi reading Candido
- Categories: Satirical magazine
- Frequency: Weekly
- Publisher: Rizzoli
- Founded: 1945
- Final issue: 1961
- Country: Italy
- Based in: Milan
- Language: Italian

Candido was a satirical magazine published in Milan, Italy, between 1945 and 1961. It was cofounded and edited by Giovannino Guareschi.

== History and profile ==
Candido started in 1945 as a successor of another satirical magazine, Bertoldo. It was cofounded by Giovannino Guareschi, Giaci Mondaini and Giovanni Mosca on the request of the Italian publisher Angelo Rizzoli. The magazine was published on a weekly basis, and its headquarters was in Milan. Giovannino Guareschi also served as the editor-in-chief of the magazine and resigned from the post in 1957. However, he continued to contribute to the weekly. In the period 1952–1953 Candido sold 180,000–200,000 copies. Later its circulation reached 225,000 copies.

The magazine had a monarchist and moderately conservative stance. For the magazine editors Catholics and communists were in continuous and inflexible opposition. It frequently published cartoons featuring the major political figures of the period, including Christian democrat Alcide De Gasperi and communist Palmiro Togliatti. Candido ceased publication in 1961.

== See also ==
- List of magazines in Italy
- Bertoldo
