= La rabbia =

1963 Italian documentary

- Directed by: Pier Paolo Pasolini, Giovannino Guareschi
- Written by: Giovannino Guareschi, Pier Paolo Pasolini
- Screenplay by: Pier Paolo Pasolini, Giovannino Guareschi
- Story by: Pier Paolo Pasolini, Giovannino Guareschi
- Produced by: Gastone Ferranti
- Starring: Pier Paolo Pasolini
- Narrated by: Giorgio Bassani, Renato Guttuso (Pasolini's segment); Carlo Romano, Gigi Artuso (Guareschi's segment)
- Edited by: Nino Baragli, Pier Paolo Pasolini
- Release date: 1963
- Running time: 104 minutes
- Country: Italy
- Language: Italian

La Rabbia (eng. Anger) is a 1963 Italian documentary film produced by Gastone Ferranti and directed by Pier Paolo Pasolini in the first half and by Giovannino Guareschi in the second.

== Overview ==
Film producer Gastone Ferranti wanted to make a movie with two of the most important Italian intellectuals of the 1960s: Giovannino Guareschi and Pier Paolo Pasolini, despite them being diametrically opposite – one a right-wing monarchist, and the other a Communist militant, and yet branded as "heretics" by their own side. The producer's goal was to make a sort of "match" where Guareschi and Pasolini gave their own answers to a single question, i.e. what was the cause of the discontent, of the fear and of the conflicts shaking the society of the time. The movie, analyzing the social conflicts of the contemporary world in a strongly critical and controversial way, was made through the montage of old footage from Ferranti's Mondo Libero newsreels, archive material concerning different countries, pictures from art books and magazines. Guareschi criticizes the degradation of art for commercial aims, and more broadly the "soulless" modernity wiping out any perspective other than materialism and, lastly, causes distrust towards the future.

In his part of the documentary, Pasolini deals with the 1956 Hungarian Revolution and of the Cuban Revolution, praises progressivism, decolonization and class struggle, he takes Marilyn Monroe's death as an example to speak about the death of beauty, complains about the disappearance of the rural world and heavily criticizes industrialization, conservatism, anti-communism and the bourgeoisie. Part of Pasolini's film was cut to make room for Guareschi in the final cut.

Despite starting from opposite positions, Guareschi's and Pasolini's statements have some points of convergence, especially regarding the alienation and de-humanization in the modern world. It might even seem that both turned out to be prophetic, although in a negative way.

== Reception ==
The film came out in 1963, but it was withdrawn from theatres just a few weeks later. The film performed poorly upon its release resulting in little circulation. Pasolini's half had a limited circulation in later years, while Guareschi's half disappeared completely. In contemporary times there has been renewed interest in it, especially for its creative use of archival footage and cinematography. In 2011 the critic Evan Calder Williams described Pasolini's part of the film as "one of those singularly venomous examples of how 'political art' doesn't have to make you loathe both politics and art" but dismissed Guareschi's as "a trashy little right-wing film"; Williams concluded that "there is nothing that is not profoundly conservative, weak-tongued, and pettily fascist alongside" Pasolini's sequence.

It was not until the 65th Venice Film Festival to see Pasolini's film being brought back into the light, restored and in an "extended director's cut" version. Giuseppe Bertolucci, the director of the restoration project, justified the absence of Guareschi's half by defining his statements on decolonization and on the Algerian War "intolerable". At the time Bertolucci was also the head of the committee for the celebrations of the centennial of Guareschi's birth: following his declarations, he obviously had to resign. Once the controversy blew over, La rabbia was shown at the "Fiuggi Family Festival" the following year, with both Guareschi's and Pasolini's part, to great acclaim of the public.
