= Giacinto Mondaini =

Italian painter and humorist (1903–1979)

- Born: 6 July 1903; Milan, Lombardy, Kingdom of Italy
- Died: 11 August 1979 (aged 76); Kiens, South Tyrol, Italy
- Other name: Giaci Mondaini
- Occupations: Painter; humorist; cartoonist; illustrator; screenwriter
- Spouse: Joséphine Lombardini (sep. 1945)
- Children: Sandra
- Relatives: Raimondo Vianello (son-in-law)

Giacinto "Giaci" Mondaini (6 July 1903 – 11 August 1979) was an Italian painter, humorist, cartoonist, illustrator, and screenwriter.

== Biography ==
Born in Milan in 1903, Giaci Mondaini began his career in the 1930s with his friend, the writer Giovannino Guareschi, at the humor magazine Bertoldo, whose editorial staff repeatedly clashed with the Fascist regime. At the same time, he contributed graphic designs to stamps billboards, magazines, and comic strips. His daughter Sandra was often his model since she was a baby. He was married to Giuseppina "Joséphine" Lombardini (1906–1997), an Argentine woman from whom he separated immediately after the Second World War, leaving the family.

In 1935, he wrote with Cesare Zavattini the subject for the film I Will Give a Million. After the 1950s, he produced paintings and humorous drawings.

Mondaini died, probably of cardiac arrest, in a camping in Kiens, South Tyrol, on 11 August 1979.
