= Angelo Rizzoli (publisher, born 1889) =

Italian publisher and film producer (1889–1970)

Cavaliere Angelo Rizzoli OMRI, OCI, OML
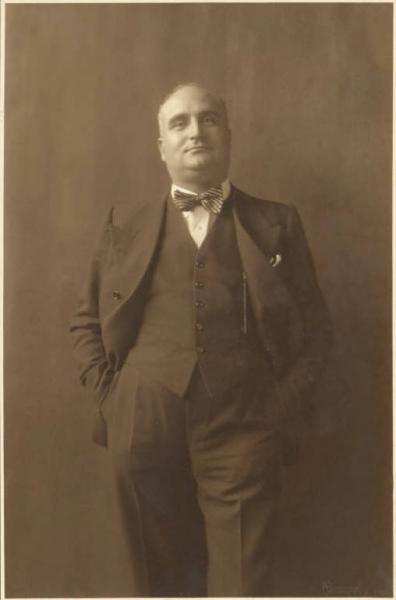
- Angelo Rizzoli, photo by Emilio Sommariva (1932)
- Born: 31 October 1889; Milan, Italy
- Died: 24 September 1970 (aged 80); Milan, Italy
- Education: Martinitt
- Occupation: Businessman
- Years active: 1911–1970
- Known for: Founder of RCS MediaGroup and Cineriz
- Children: Andrea (1914–1983); Giuseppina (1916–2005); Giuditta (1918–1930)
Angelo Rizzoli
- Military career
- Allegiance: Kingdom of Italy
- Branch: Royal Italian Army
- Service years: 1914–1917
- Rank: Corporal
- Conflicts: World War I

Angelo Rizzoli OML (Italian pronunciation: [ˈandʒelo ritˈtsɔːli]; 31 October 1889 – 24 September 1970) was an Italian publisher and film producer, one of the most influential and wealthiest men in Italy of his time, a Knight of the Order of Merit for Labour (OML).

Orphaned at the age of eight, he attended the Martinitt orphanage, fought in the First World War, and at the age of 20 opened his first small printing shop. Over the following decades, he turned his RCS MediaGroup into an international media empire that published over 20 periodicals and released books by the best contemporary and classical authors. By the early 1940s, Rizzoli was already one of the wealthiest men in Italy.

In the early 1950s, he turned his attention to film production. As a producer, Rizzoli owned and co-owned numerous companies, most notably Cineriz. Thanks to Rizzoli, masterpieces such as Federico Fellini's La Dolce Vita and 8½, Michelangelo Antonioni's Red Desert, and others were brought to the screen. He was nominated four times for the Nastro d'Argento award as Best Producer and won it twice.

Following Rizzoli's death, his heirs were unable to save the company and preserve their father's legacy; due to poor management and under the influence of unscrupulous advisers, RCS accumulated billions of debt, forcing the family to sell the business itself and virtually all their assets; Rizzoli's son and grandson became embroiled in numerous legal disputes, whilst another son and his granddaughter took their own lives.

== Biography ==
=== Early life ===
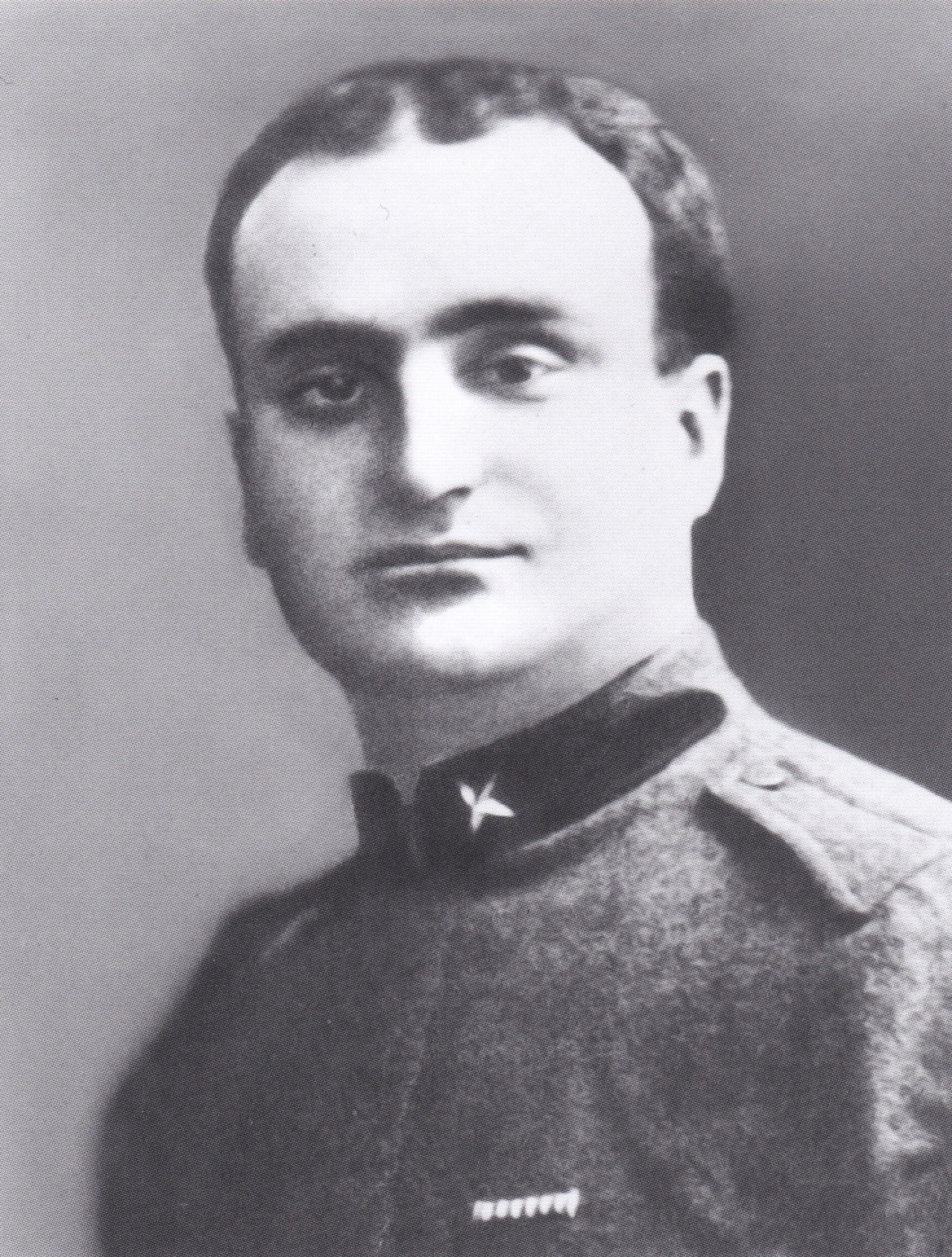
Angelo Rizzoli during World War I, 1916

Rizzoli was born in Milan on 31 October 1889, into a family that suffered from extreme poverty. His father Angelo Tamburini, an illiterate shoemaker, committed suicide after losing his job 3 months before his son's birth. The mother, Giuditta, had fragile health, but worked at two jobs, struggling to feed Angelo and his elder sisters, Antonietta Eva and Andreina Elisa. When Angelo was eight, Giuditta had developed a heart disease and was hospitalised, so Angeli was sent to an orphanage. He was lucky enough to find himself in Martinitt, a famous Milanese orphanage founded by St Jerome Emiliani back in the 16th century. Its notable alumni were Leonardo Del Vecchio, founder of Luxottica, and Edoardo Bianchi, of the eponymous bicycle and car manufacturing company. He lived in the orphanage, but attended a state school in Brera, surrounded by classmates from well-off families. From there on, he never pursued any formal education, learning everything solely through practice.

Through the orphanage, Rizzoli was trained as a typographer and became an apprentice at a printing workshop of Ugolino Marucelli and, later, found employment at several printing shops (Marucelli, Bernini, Alfieri & Lacroix). In 1909, when he was just 20 years old, he opened his own printing business together with his friend Pietro Pizio. His idea was to produce commemorative postcards of the Libyan campaign, which proved a great success. Initially, he printed black-and-white advertising leaflets, but by 1913 he had acquired new equipment for colour printing. By that point, he was financially secure, and in 1912 married Anna Marzorati, the daughter of the owner of a small printing shop.

Both his business and family life were interrupted in 1914, when Rizzoli was drafted to the army. He fought through World War I, first as a bersagliere cyclist and then as an ambulance driver for the army. Discharged in 1917 following an episode of pleurisy, Rizzoli returned to Milan. His first son, Andrea, was born in 1914, when Rizzoli was still in the army.

Immediately upon his return, Rizzoli invested all his savings (40,000 lire, around 80,000 euros in 2020) in purchasing four prestigious but financially struggling magazines from Mondadori, which he transformed into highly successful women's magazines.

By 1924, his business had grown so big that he already had 100 employees. The expansion of its first printing workshops in the 1910s and 1920s (the printing works moved from Via Cerva to Via Anfossi and finally to Via Broggi) did not merely entail an increase in facilities and staff numbers, but above all a growing quality of his production: from contract work for larger printing firms and the printing of commercial material, Rizzoli moved on to increasingly sophisticated products and collaboration with publishers. He was one of the first in Italy to install a rotogravure machine.

=== Publishing business ===
In 1927, Rizzoli founded the company A. Rizzoli & Co. In the same year, he acquired Novella magazine, a bi-weekly primarily for women that reached a circulation of 130,000 copies, from Mondadori, an independent publisher who specialized in books and magazines. After his initial purchase, Rizzoli added several new publications, including Annabella, Bertoldo, Candido, Omnibus, Oggi, and L'Europeo. Mondadori sold Omnibus because he didn't want to deal with a publication launched as an instrument of fascist propaganda. In his turn, through satire Rizzoli managed to turn it into the only publication criticising the regime from within, ultimately leading to its closure at the demand of the censors.

In 1929, Rizzoli began publishing books, including both classics and popular novels by Italian and foreign authors. Although he was never an avid reader himself, according to Indro Montanelli, Rizzoli had a 'Midas touch' even in the publishing business: not only did he amass a fortune, but he also made a significant contribution to culture. One of the biggest works of that period was printing of the Enciclopedia Italiana, launched by Giovanni Treccani. Rizzoli published one volume of the encyclopaedia every three months; the entire publication comprised 35 volumes (plus one index volume), containing 60,000 articles and 50 million words. The work was finished in 1937.

In 1938, Rizzoli purchased a big printing house in Rome and in 1940 another one in Milan. The latter was seriously damaged in 1943 during the bombings, but after the War Rizzoli managed to recover fast and restore the production. In the late 1940s, the company released a total of 15 weekly publications with a total printrun of 3 mln copies. In 1949, Rizzoli launched Biblioteca Universale Rizzoli (BUR), a book series offering the world's greatest classics at very low prices (50 lire for a 100-page pocketbook). The series had incredible success and for decades influenced the cultural life of Italy.

In 1954, Rizzoli acquired the company 'Cartiera di Lama di Reno', laying the foundations for what would later become an Italian publishing empire. The former paper mill had been founded back in 1746. Rizzoli hired the architect Mario Tufaroli Luciano, who reconstructed and completely redesigned the premises. The complex, covering an area of around 75,000 square metres, in 1966 was equipped with Europe's first de-inking plant, marking the start—with a vision ahead of its time—of paper production from recycled materials.

In 1964, Rizzoli opened the original Rizzoli International Bookstore in New York City at 712 Fifth Avenue, designed by architect Ferdinand Gottlieb. The bookstore was featured in various Hollywood films, most notably, Woody Allen's Manhattan and Falling in Love, with Robert De Niro and Meryl Streep.

In 1969, he constructed a five-storey building on Via Civitavecchia in Milan to house the editorial offices of his new magazine, Oggi (Note: The building was demolished in 2018.). It remained of the few unrealized projects of Angelo Rizzoli, because the publication was never launched even after ten pilot editions. To fulfill the father's dream and fill in the only remaining empty niche in their empire, son Andrea bought Corriere della Sera in 1974.

=== Film production ===
Around 1949, Rizzoli made his first steps as film producer by financing projects of Giuseppe Amato. Their first collaboration was Yvonne of the Night. It was Giuseppe Amato who arranged the first meeting between the relatively young Federico Fellini and Rizzoli, already a tycoon. According to Fellini, Amato had also persuaded Rizzoli to step in and support Fellini's ambitious projects, with his impressive industrial apparatus both in terms of financing and promotion through press. In 1958, Rizzoli and Amato co-founded Riama production company that was responsible for the production of La Dolce Vita. Fellini wanted a budget of 600 mln lire, while an average production cost for a movie in Italy at that time was around 150 mln lire. Rizzoli was the only one who could afford it, but he was also the only willing to take the high risk. Even though the production resulted in multiple conflicts between Amato, Fellini and Rizzoli, and even led to closure of Riama, the huge success of the film started a long story of collaboration between Rizzoli and Fellini. Rizzoli referred to Fellini as the 'gran maestro', however, often jokingly reminding that the director's success happened only due to Rizzoli's putting money into La Dolce Vita. Fellini always responded: 'And you, my friend, for a pittance bought a hen that lays you golden eggs'.

In 1956, Rizzoli founded Cineriz, An abbreviation of Cinema Rizzoli, it was expanded in 1965 with the launch of Rizzoli FIlm. Through Cineriz and Rizzoli Film, he produced All the Gold in the World, Paris, Palace Hotel, We're Dancing on the Rainbow, Last Year at Marienbad, Everybody's Woman, L'Eclisse, and many more, including a super successful series about Don Camillo.

Rizzoli also had control of the French company Francinex, with which he co-produced 8½, Madame du Barry, as well as French films such as Une Parisienne (1957),

Through another company, Film Duemila, Rizzoli produced Michelangelo Antonioni's Red Desert. He also produced De Sica's masterpieces Umberto D., The Two Orphans, Madame Butterfly through Rizzoli Film, and Red Roses through ERA Film.

Angelo Rizzoli was four times nominated for Nastro d'Argento as the best producer and won two times – in 1961 for La Dolce Vita in 1964 for 8½.

=== Other efforts ===
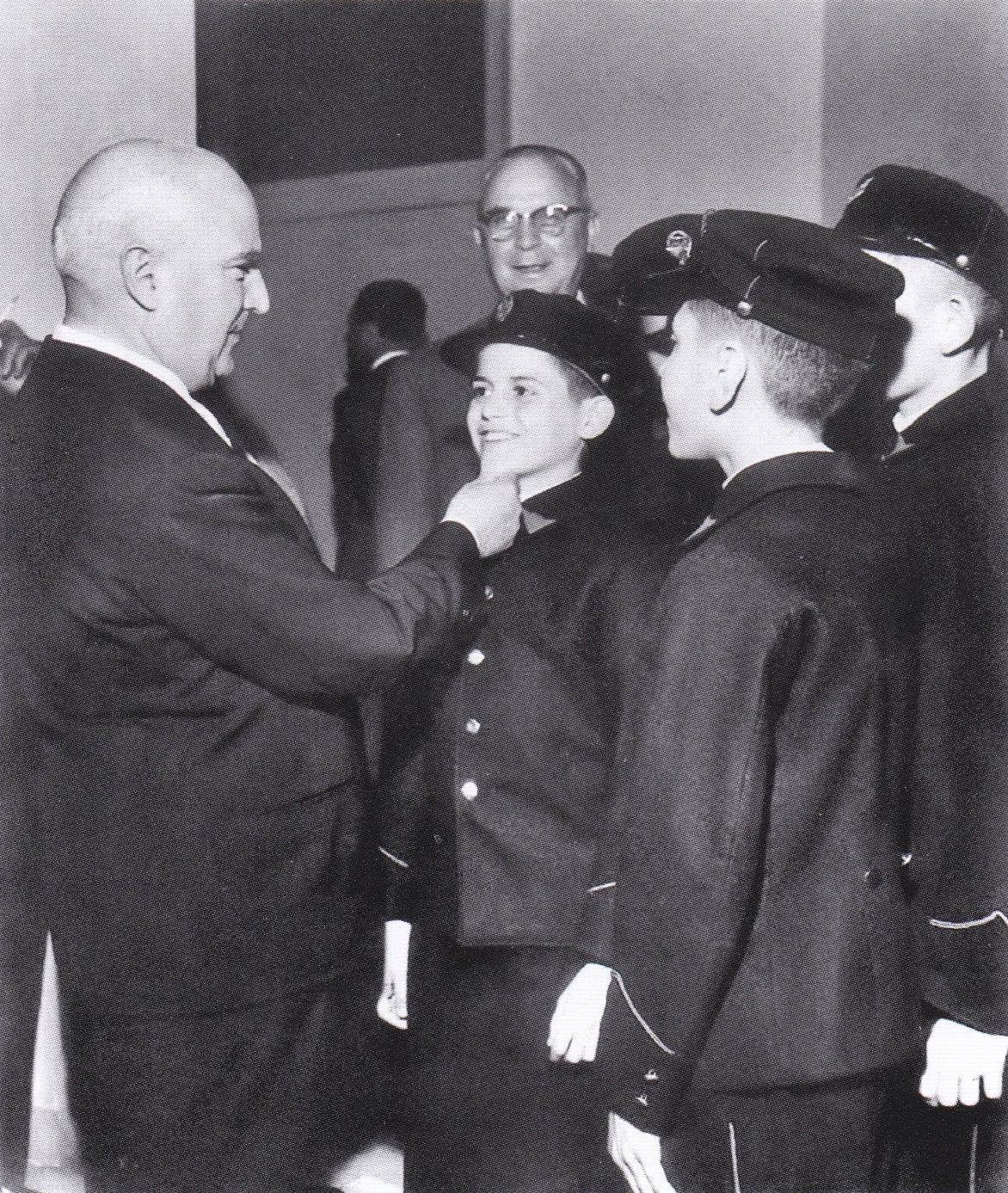
Rizzoli at the Martinitt, 1960

Angelo Rizzoli was a major benefactor. For all his life, he donated money to the Martinitt, the orphanage where he grew up. In 1951, he founded in Milan the first in Italy professional school of graphic arts, which today bears his name.

On the island of Ischia, where Rizzoli loved to spend summer vacations, he restored the historical thermal baths and built a hospital named after his wife – the Anna Rizzoli Hospital. It was built in 1961 and officially opened in 1962. Rizzoli invested heavily in the island's development, opened several luxury hotels there and played a key role in the growth of tourism on Ischia.

In 1954, Angelo Rizzoli purchased AC Milan from Umberto Trabattoni. Rizzoli had great ambitions and intended to make Milan one of the leading teams both in Italy and on the international stage. He invested heavily in the team's development, though the actual president who followed the squad was Andrea. During his presidency, Milan's golden squad included José Altafini, Schiaffino, Grillo, Liedholm, Maldini, and Buffon. On 22 May 1963, a triumphant victory in the first European Cup final at Wembley Stadium over Eusébio's Benfica marked a decade of his efforts. At the same time, the Milanello sports centre was opened, considered state-of-the-art at the time. After that, feeling the mission was accomplished, the Rizzoli left the world of football.

== Personal life ==
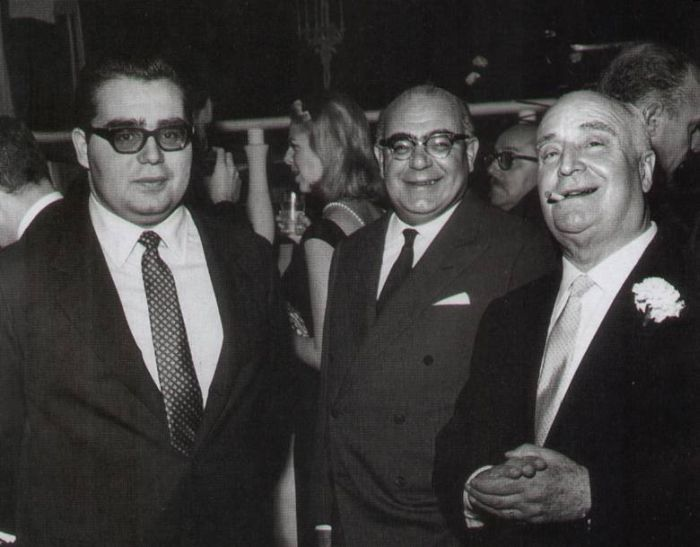
The Rizzoli, from right to left: Angelo Senior, Andrea, Angelo Jr.

At home and by friends, Angelo Rizzoli was nicknamed 'il Commenda' (or 'il Cumenda'), as he had an authoritarian character, never showed any tenderness and was a strict patriarchalist. With his wife Anna Marzorati, Angelo Rizzoli had three children: Andrea, Giuseppina and Giuditta (Rita Rinella), who died prematurely at the age of only 12. Andrea and Giuseppina gave him 7 grandchildren. According to family memories, il Commenda, though always generous, never spoiled either of them and always made them work and join the family business as early as possible. Close friends knew that Andrea, the principal heir to the Rizzoli empire, had a gentle character and had suffered from an inferiority complex all his life, fearing he would fail to live up to the expectations of his distinguished father. Andrea's first son, Angelo Junior (or Angelone) was the one who took over after Andrea's demise.

Despite being married, when Rizzoli had become a well-known producer, he had numerous affairs with actresses, including long-term relationships with Graziella Granata and Myriam Bru. When trying to justify his affairs, he would wave his hands in front of his grown-up sons: 'Mum's always in bed, she's ill.' This was partly true, as Anna had never fully recovered from the loss of her youngest daughter. Still, Rizzoli treated his wife with the utmost respect, affectionately called her 'mammetta', and always publicly praised her contribution to all his endeavours; every Sunday he gave Anna her favourite roses and spent with her an entire day. When Anna was misdiagnosed with breast cancer, he built a hospital on Ischia and named it after her, so that she could always receive expert medical care.

In addition to his numerous villas and ships, Rizzoli owned what was then the largest yacht in the Mediterranean — the 43-metre-long Il Sereno. It was formerly a minesweeper belonging to the US Navy, purchased by Rizzoli on the civilian market and converted by the shipyards in Viareggio. The yacht had eight large guest cabins, all with en-suite bathrooms, as well as crew quarters, a galley and other saloons. Rizzoli guests on Il Sereno were Mohammad Reza Pahlavi, Walter Chiari, Ava Gardner, Elizabeth Taylor, Sofia Loren, John Wayne, and many other celebrities and aristocrats.

Angelo Rizzoli always distanced himself from politics. His only friend among the politicians was Pietro Nenni, also an orphan.

He was famous for his extraordinary luck, he could play in the casinos on three or four tables simultaneously, and often won. However, when losing, he 'punished' himself for the vice of gambling by making same size donations to the Martinitt.

Angelo Rizzoli died on 24 September 1970, leaving behind a hundred-billion empire and zero debts, as one of his core business principles was never to take out loans. He first the first person in Italy that received a two-page necrologue in Corriere della Sera.

== The Rizzoli after the death of Angelo ==
After the death of il Commenda, the entire clan of Rizzoli went into rapid decline. Neither Andrea, nor Angelone had inherited Andrea Rizzoli entrepreneur grit. Andrea's decision to purchase Corriere della Sera in 1974 marked the beginning of the end. Andrea bought the newspaper without properly checking its accounts, and the newspaper had long been in financial difficulty, incurring losses of 4 million lire a month. As early as 1975, the balance sheet showed losses of five billion lire, and the following year, twenty billion. In 1974, without giving it much thought, Andrea Rizzoli signed agreements to buy out the other shareholders' shares with a three-year deferral; by 1977, a debt of 100 billion lire had to be repaid. As confirmed by later court decisions, Andrea, and then Angelo Jr., were tricked and manipulated by the financial director of RCS Bruno Tassan Din, lawyer Umberto Ortolani and several unknown investors who through a series of deals made the family lose control of their stake in the company and accumulate even bigger debts, eventually selling almost all property.

In 1987, aged 23, Isabella Rizzoli, the daughter of Ljuba and Andrea Rizzoli, committed suicide, presumably caused by failed attempts to fight drug addiction.

In 1983, RCS went into receivership and Angelone Rizzoli, along with his brother Alberto and the managing director Bruno Tassan Din, was arrested on charges of bankruptcy. He was released after 21 days in prison and following the seizure of his assets. He was subsequently acquitted. Andrea Rizzoli died of a heart attack a few months after his sons' arrest. The last photo of il Sereno, abandoned and half-sunken near the Fiumicino Airport, was taken in 1996.

Angelone Rizzoli was arrested again in February 2013 on bankruptcy fraud charges. He died on 11 December 2013, because, despite suffering from numerous serious conditions such as multiple sclerosis, kidney failure, hypertension, and diabetes, he was denied transfer under domiciliary arrest.

Alberto Rizzoli, Andrea's son, Angelone's brother and Angelo Rizzoli's grandson, committed suicide aged 74.

== Honours ==
In recognition of his entrepreneurial achievements, Rizzoli was awarded various honours:

- November 1931 – Commendatore;
- May 1936 – Cavaliere del Lavoro;
- December 1952 – Grand Officer;
- September 1953 – Chevalier de la Légion d'Honneur, on the recommendation of the then French Foreign Minister;
- December 1965 – Knight Grand Cross;
- April 1967 – Count, by the former King of Italy, Umberto di Savoia, in exile in Cascais.

== Memory ==
Angelo Rizzoli museum, dedicated to his life and career, is located at Villa Arbusto in Naples.

== Literature ==
- Capriati, Davide (2022). Management dell'editoria. Milan: Mimesis Edizioni. ISBN 9788857596358.
- Giocondi, Michele (2018). Breve storia dell'editoria italiana (1861-2018) con 110 schede monografiche delle case editrici di ieri e di oggi. Dai fratelli Treves a Jeff Bezos. goWare. ISBN 9788833631196.
- Balestriere, Giorgio (2005). Angelo Rizzoli: zio d'America d'Ischia. Imagaenaria. p. 35, 95.
- Carraro, Nicola; Rizzoli, Alberto (2015). Rizzoli. Mondadori Electa. ISBN 9788851051402.
- Afeltra, Gaetano (2000). Angelo Rizzoli 1889 – 1970 (PDF). RCS.
- Bianchi, Chiara (2024). Il canto della fortuna. Salani Editore. ISBN 9788831021937.
- Burke, Frank; Waller, Marguerite; Gubareva, Marita (2020). A Companion to Federico Fellini. John Wiley & Sons.
