= Don Camillo and Peppone =

Fictional characters

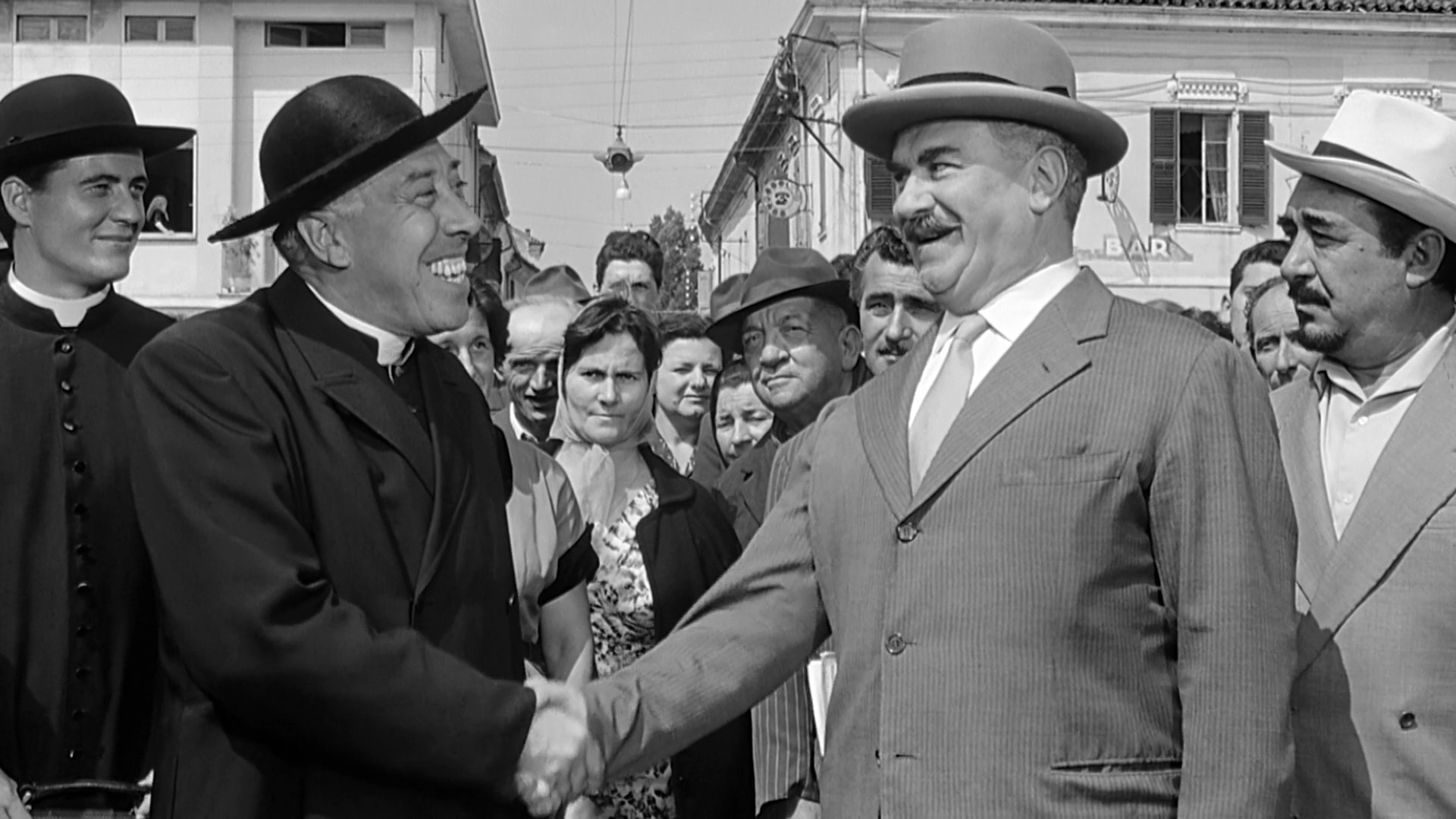
Fernandel (left) as Don Camillo and Gino Cervi as Peppone in Don Camillo: Monsignor by Carmine Gallone (1961)

Don Camillo (pronounced [ˈdɔŋ kaˈmillo]) and Peppone (pronounced [pepˈpoːne]) are the fictional protagonists of a series of works by the Italian writer and journalist Giovannino Guareschi set in what Guareschi refers to as the "small world" of rural Italy after World War II. Most of the Don Camillo stories came out in the weekly magazine Candido, founded by Guareschi with Giovanni Mosca. These "Little World" (Italian: Piccolo Mondo) stories amounted to 347 in total and were put together and published in eight books, only the first three of which were published when Guareschi was still alive.

Don Camillo is a parish priest and is said to have been inspired by an actual Roman Catholic priest, World War II partisan and detainee at the concentration camps of Dachau and Mauthausen, named Don Camillo Valota (1912–1998). Guareschi was also inspired by Don Alessandro Parenti, a priest of Trepalle, near the Swiss border. Peppone is the communist town mayor. The tensions between the two characters and their respective factions form the basis of the works' satirical plots.

== Characterisation ==
In the post-war years (after 1945), Don Camillo Tarocci (his full name, which he rarely uses) is the hotheaded priest of a small town in the Po Valley in northern Italy. He is a big man, tall and strong with hard fists. For the films, the town chosen to represent that of the books was Brescello (which currently has a museum dedicated to Don Camillo and Peppone) after the production of movies based on Guareschi's tales, but in the first story Don Camillo is introduced as the parish priest of Ponteratto.

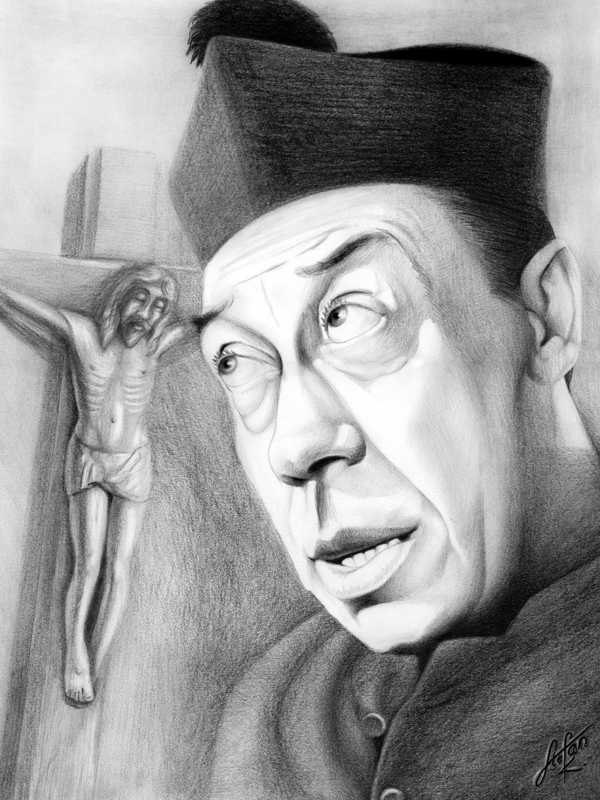
Don Camillo talking with Jesus. He is wearing a black biretta.

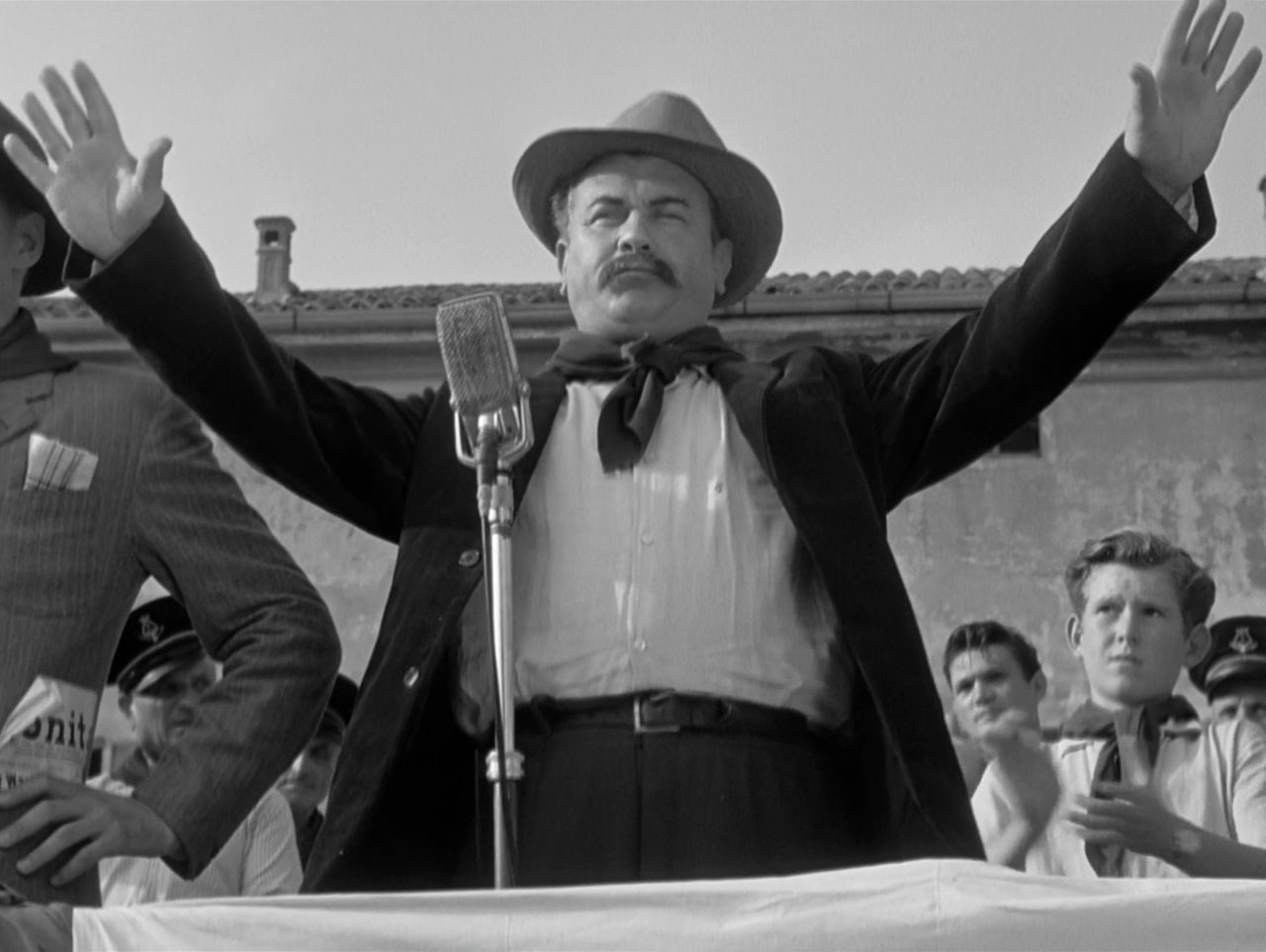
Gino Cervi as Peppone

Don Camillo is constantly at odds with the communist mayor, Giuseppe Bottazzi, better known as Peppone (meaning, roughly, 'Big Joe', an allusion to Josef Stalin) and is also on very close terms with the crucifix in his town church. Through the crucifix he hears the voice of Christ. The Christ on the crucifix often has far greater understanding than Don Camillo of the troubles of the people, and has to constantly but gently reprimand the priest for his impatience.

What Peppone and Camillo have in common is an interest in the well-being of the town. They also appear to have both been partisan fighters during World War II; one episode mentions Camillo having braved German patrols in order to reach Peppone and his fellow Communists in the mountains and say Mass for them under field conditions. While Peppone makes public speeches about how "the reactionaries" ought to be shot, and Don Camillo preaches fire and brimstone against "godless Communists", they actually grudgingly admire each other. Therefore, they sometimes end up working together in peculiar circumstances, though keeping up their squabbling. Thus, although he publicly opposes the Catholic Church as a Party duty, Peppone takes his gang to the church and baptises his children there, which makes him part of Don Camillo's flock; Peppone and other Communists are also seen venerating the Virgin Mary and local Saints. Don Camillo also never condemns Peppone himself, but the ideology of Communism which is in direct opposition to the Church.

Peppone and his comrades are at times seen at odds with the city-based Communist bureaucrats, who are sometimes seen as "barging in" and trying to impose policy on the local Communists without knowing conditions on the ground. This is paralleled by Don Camillo sometimes coming into serious conflict with his Bishop, one occasion a case of flagrant disobedience leading to Camillo’s exiled to a tiny village high in the mountains; the Bishop is soon forced to reinstate him at the strong demand of his parishioners (including the Communists).

As depicted in the stories, the Communists are the only political party with a mass grassroots organization in the town. The Christian Democracy party, the main force in Italian politics at the time, does not have a local political organization (at least, none is ever mentioned); rather, it is the Catholic Church which unofficially but very obviously plays that role. Don Camillo thus plays an explicitly political as well as religious role. For example, when the Communists organize a local campaign to sign the Stockholm Peace Appeal, it is Don Camillo who organizes a counter-campaign, and the townspeople take for granted that such a political campaign is part of his work as priest.

Many stories are satirical and take on the real-world political divide between the Italian Catholic Church and the Italian Communist Party, as well as broader political issues. Others are tragedies about schism, politically motivated murder, and personal vendettas in a small town where everyone knows everyone else, but not everyone necessarily likes everyone else very much.

Political forces other than the Communists and the Catholics have only a marginal presence. In one episode, the local Communists are incensed at the announcement that the small Italian Liberal Party has scheduled an election rally in their town, and mobilize in force to break it up—only to discover virtually no local Liberals have turned up; the Liberal speaker, a middle-aged professor, speaks to a predominantly Communist audience and wins its grudging respect by his courage and determination.

In one story, Don Camillo visits the Soviet Union, pretending to be a comrade. In another, the arrival of popular culture and motorcycles propels Don Camillo into fighting "decadence", a struggle in which he finds he has his hands full, especially when Christ mainly smiles benevolently on the young rascals. In this later collection, Peppone is the owner of several profitable dealerships, riding the "Boom" years of the 1960s in Italy. He is no longer quite the committed Communist he once was, but he still does not get on with Don Camillo – at least not in public. Don Camillo has his own problems: the Second Vatican Council has brought changes in the Church, and a new assistant priest, who comes to be called Don Chichì, has been foisted upon him to see that Don Camillo moves with the times. Don Camillo, of course, has other ideas.

Despite their bickering, the goodness and generosity of each character can be seen during hard times. They always understand and respect each other when one is in danger, when a flood devastates the town, when death takes a loved one, and in many other situations in which the two "political enemies" show their mutual respect for one another and fight side by side for the same ideals (even if they are each conditioned by their individual public roles in society).

Guareschi created a second series of novels about a similar character, Don Candido, Archbishop of Trebilie (or Trebiglie, literally "three marble balls" or "three billiard balls"). The name of this fictional town is a play on words of Trepalle (literally "three balls"), a real town (near Livigno) whose priest was an acquaintance of Guareschi's.

== Books in chronological order ==
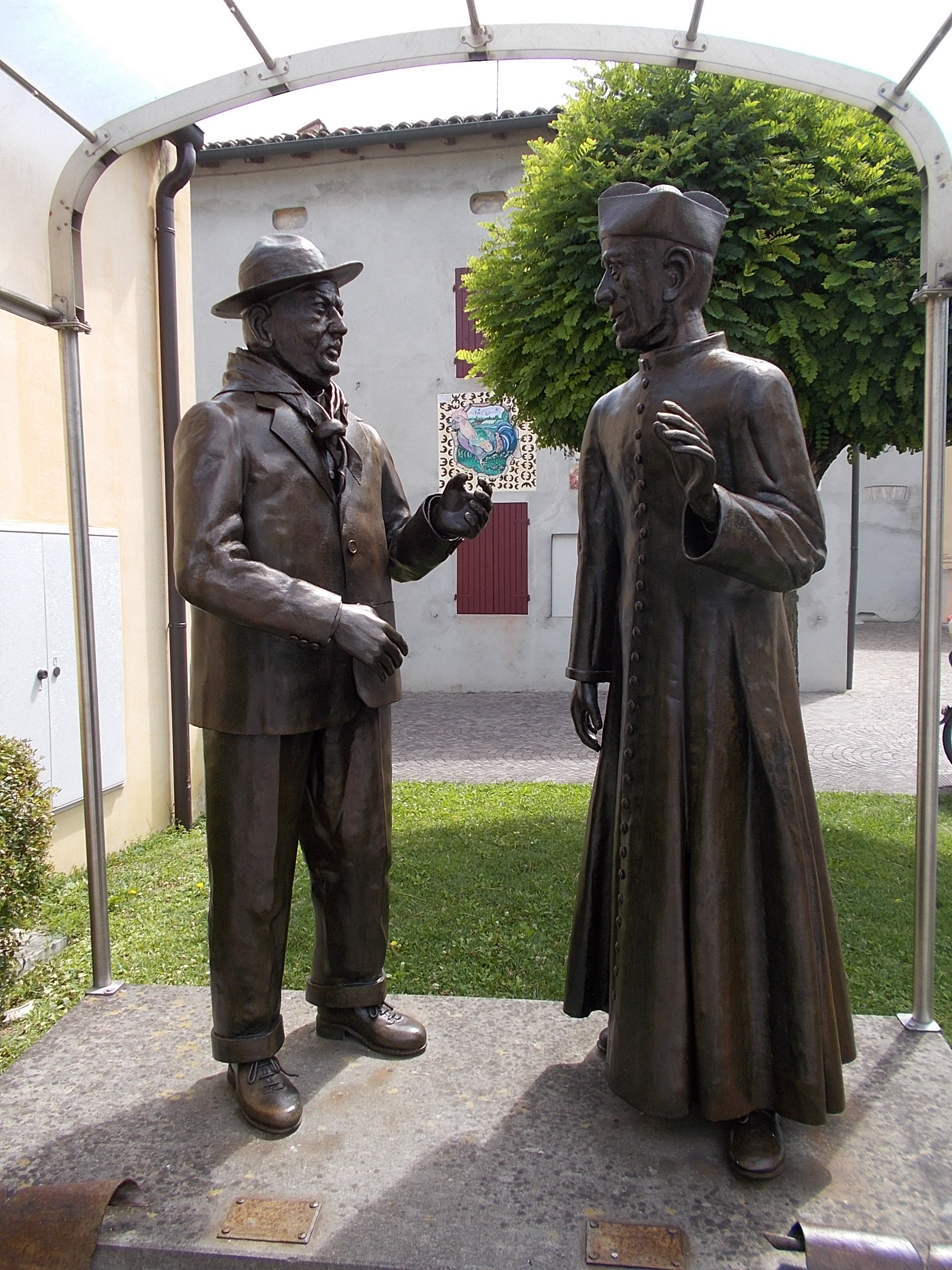
Statues of Don Camillo and Peppone in Sorbolo Mezzani

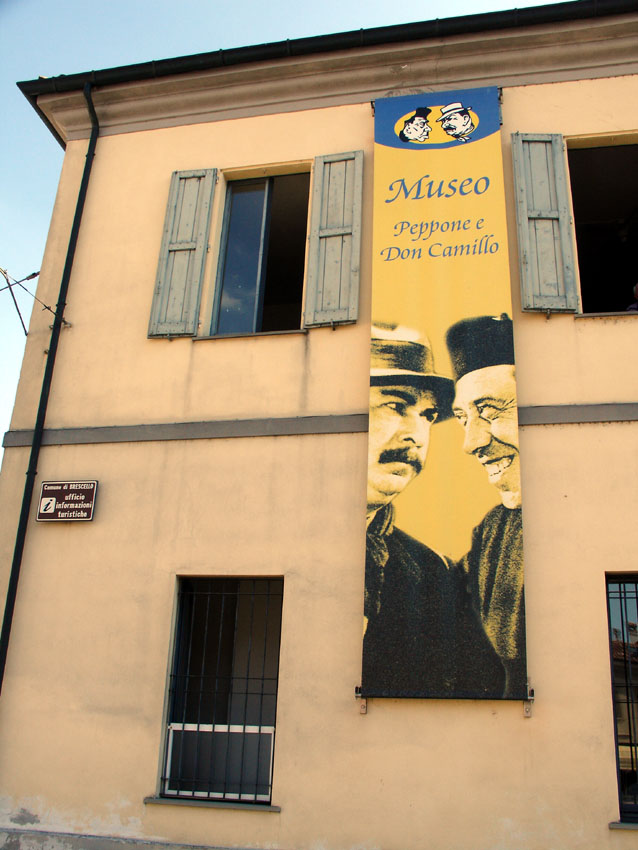
Museum of Peppone and Don Camillo in Brescello

The following Italian language books have been published:

- Mondo Piccolo: Don Camillo. [Pub: Rizzoli, 1948] Literally: Little World: Don Camillo
- Mondo Piccolo: Don Camillo e il suo gregge. [Pub: Rizzoli, 1953] Literally: Little World: Don Camillo and His Flock
- Mondo Piccolo: Il compagno don Camillo. [Pub: Rizzoli, 1963] Literally: Little World: Comrade Don Camillo

The following Italian language books have been published posthumously:

- Mondo Piccolo: Don Camillo e i giovani d'oggi. [Pub: Rizzoli, 1969] Literally: Little World: Don Camillo and the Youth of Today
- Gente così. 1980.
- Lo spumarino pallido. 1981.
- Noi del Boscaccio. 1983.
- L'anno di don Camillo. 1986.
- Il decimo clandestino. 1987.
- Ciao don Camillo. 1996.
- Don Camillo e don Chichì. 1996. The complete version of Don Camillo e i giovani d'oggi
- Don Camillo e Peppone. [Pub: Rizzoli, 2007] ISBN 978-88-486-0355-3

The following US English translations have been published:

- The Little World of Don Camillo. [Pub: Pellegrini and Cudahy, 1950] (Mondo Piccolo: Don Camillo, translated by Una Vincenzo Troubridge)
- Don Camillo and His Flock. [Pub: Pellegrini and Cudahy, 1952] (Mondo Piccolo: Don Camillo e il suo gregge, translated by Frances Frenaye)
- Don Camillo's Dilemma. [Pub: Farrar, Straus, and Young, Inc., 1954] (Collection of stories for English publication, translated by Frances Frenaye)
- Don Camillo takes the Devil by the Tail. [Pub: Farrar, Straus, and Young, Inc., 1957] (Collection of stories for English publication, translated by Frances Frenaye)
- Comrade Don Camillo. [Pub: Farrar, Straus, and Giroux, Inc., 1964] (Mondo Piccolo: Il compagno don Camillo, translated by Frances Frenaye)
- Don Camillo Meets the Flower Children. [Pub: Farrar, Straus, and Giroux, Inc., 1970] (Mondo Piccolo: Don Camillo e i giovani d'oggi, translated by L. K. Conrad)

The following UK English translations have been published:

- The Little World of Don Camillo. [Pub: Victor Gollancz Ltd, 1951] (Mondo Piccolo: Don Camillo, translated by Una Vincenzo Troubridge)
- Don Camillo and the Prodigal Son. [Pub: Victor Gollancz Ltd, 1952] (Mondo Piccolo: Don Camillo e il suo gregge, translated by Frances Frenaye)

- This is the UK English equivalent of the US English collection Don Camillo and His Flock, but without the final story, Appointment at Midnight

- Don Camillo's Dilemma. [Pub: Victor Gollancz Ltd, 1954] (Collection of stories for English publication, translated by Frances Frenaye)
- Don Camillo and the Devil. [Pub: Victor Gollancz Ltd, 1957] (Collection of stories for English publication, translated by Frances Frenaye)
- Comrade Don Camillo. [Pub: Victor Gollancz Ltd, 1964] (Mondo Piccolo: Il compagno don Camillo, translated by Frances Frenaye)
- Don Camillo Meets Hell's Angels. [Pub: Victor Gollancz Ltd, 1970] (Mondo Piccolo: Don Camillo e i giovani d'oggi, translated by L. K. Conrad)

The following five were compiled into a larger book published in 1980: The World of Don Camillo, to coincide with the television adaptation:

- The Little World of Don Camillo.
- Don Camillo and the Prodigal Son.
- Don Camillo's Dilemma.
- Don Camillo and the Devil.
- Comrade Don Camillo.

The World of Don Camillo does not contain all the stories contained in the individual books. The Italian, US English and UK English publications often have a different number of stories within them.

=== Pilot Productions authorised complete English-language edition (2013 onwards) ===
The Guareschi family only discovered after 1980 that the original English language publishers made unauthorised cuts in stories, only publishing 132 of the original 347 Italian stories. After an approach from Piers Dudgeon of Pilot Productions, the family authorised him to publish uncut translations into English of all the original 347 stories. The copyright is vested in the family, and the books published so far are:

- No. 1: The Complete Little World of Don Camillo (2013) ISBN 978-1900064071

- Contains Mondo Piccolo: Don Camillo

- No. 2: Don Camillo and His Flock (2015) ISBN 978-1900064187 (12 stories in this volume were published in English for the first time)

- Contains Mondo Piccolo: Don Camillo e il suo gregge

- No. 3: Don Camillo and Peppone (2016) ISBN 978-1900064262

- Contains Don Camillo e Peppone

- No. 4: Comrade Don Camillo (2017) ISBN 978-1900064330

- Contains Mondo Piccolo: Il compagno don Camillo

- No. 5: Don Camillo and Company (2018) ISBN 978-1900064408 (All 24 stories in this volume were published here in English for the first time)

- Contains stories which were not in a specific Italian-language edition

- No. 6: Don Camillo’s Dilemma (2019) ISBN 978-1900064477 (12 stories in this volume were published in English for the first time)

- Contains stories which were not in a specific Italian-language edition (the original English edition was published under the same title in 1954)

- No. 7: Don Camillo Takes the Devil by the Tail (2020) ISBN 978-1900064514

- Contains stories which were not in a specific Italian-language edition (the original English edition was published under the same title in 1957)

- No. 8: Don Camillio and Don Chichi (2021) ISBN 978-1900064569

- Contains Don Camillo e i giovani d’oggi

- No. 9: Merry Christmas Don Camillo (2022) ISBN 978-1900064590

- Contains La favola di Natale (Edizioni Riunite, 1946 - Guareschi's war-time experiences) and partly based on Diario clandestino 1943-1945, Il grande diario, Italia provvisoria Nuova and Ritorno alla base (2015), alongside Don Camillo Christmas stories.

- No. 10: Don Camillo of La Bassa (2023) ISBN 978-1900064651

- Contains Gente così - Mondo piccolo (Collana BUR, Rizzoli, 1984) – posthumously published Don Camillo stories originally written between 1948 and 1953.

- No. 11: Ciao Don Camillo, Volume One (2024) ISBN 978-1900064675

- Contains stories which were not in a specific Italian-language edition.

- No. 12: Ciao Don Camillo, Volume Two (2025) ISBN 978-1900064699

- Contains stories originally written between 1952 and 1960.

== Media ==
=== Films ===
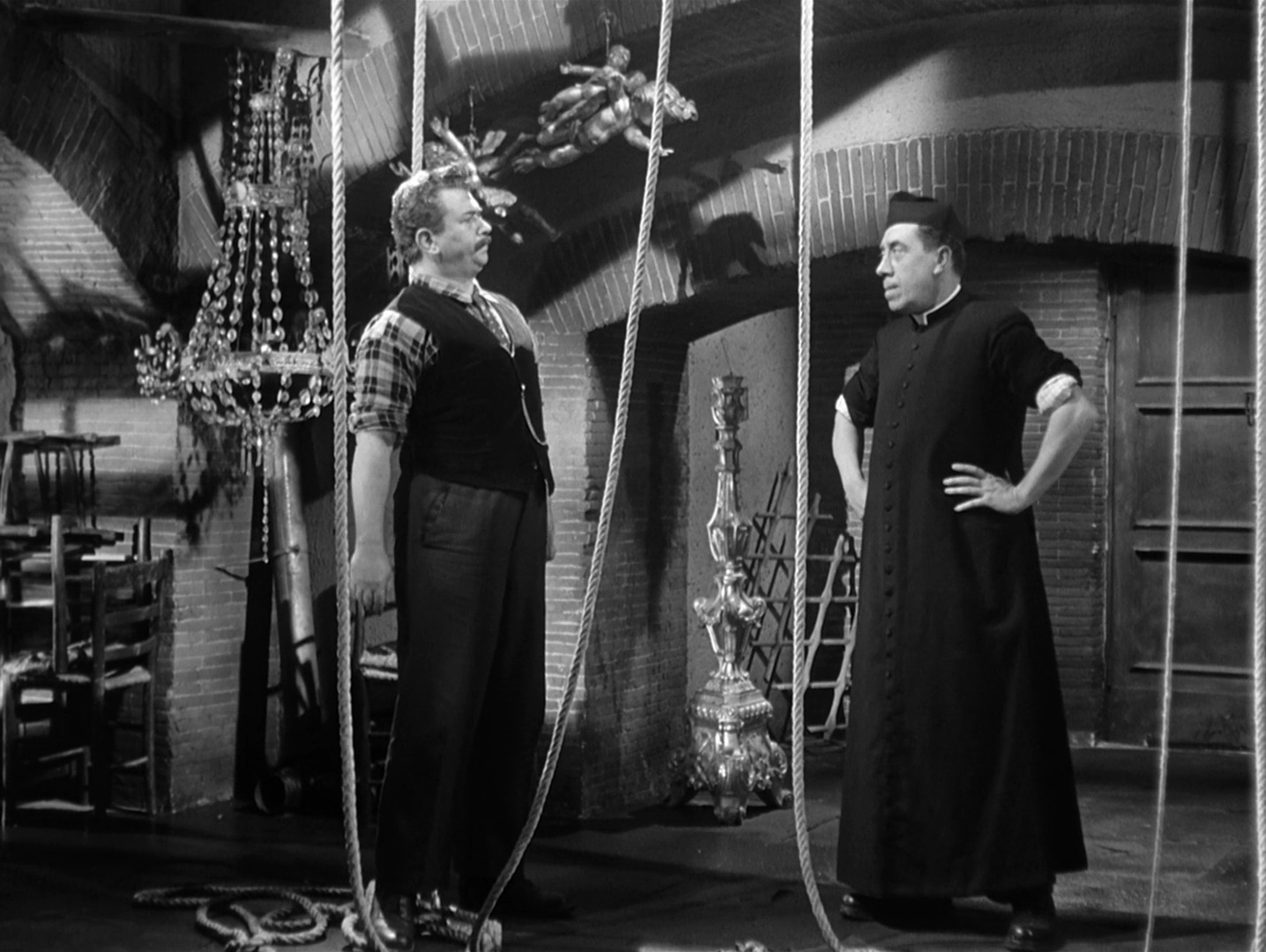
Gino Cervi as Peppone and Fernandel as Don Camillo in the first movie Little World of Don Camillo (1952)

A series of black-and-white films were made between 1952 and 1965. These were French–Italian coproductions and were simultaneously released in both languages. Don Camillo was played by French actor Fernandel, Peppone by the Italian actor Gino Cervi, quite a Guareschi-lookalike, both tall and bulky with big mustaches. The author of the original stories was involved in the scripts and helped select the main actors. To this day, the films are screened in Europe. The titles were:

- Little World of Don Camillo (Italian: Don Camillo; French: Le Petit Monde de don Camillo)
- The Return of Don Camillo (Italian: Il ritorno di don Camillo; French: Le Retour de don Camillo)
- Don Camillo's Last Round (Italian: Don Camillo e l'onorevole Peppone; French: La Grande Bagarre)
- Don Camillo: Monsignor (Italian: Don Camillo monsignore ma non troppo; French: Don Camillo Monseigneur)
- Don Camillo in Moscow (Italian: Il compagno don Camillo; French: Don Camillo en Russie)

Christian-Jaque began filming the French-Italian film Don Camillo e i giovani d'oggi in 1970 but had to stop filming due to Fernandel's falling ill, which resulted in his untimely death. The film was then realized in 1972 by Mario Camerini with Gastone Moschin playing the role of Don Camillo and Lionel Stander as Peppone. A Don Camillo (The World of Don Camillo; Italian: Don Camillo) film was remade in 1983, an Italian production with Terence Hill directing and also starring as Don Camillo. Colin Blakely performed Peppone in one of his last film roles.

=== Radio ===
A BBC Radio English-language radio dramatization of The Little World of Don Camillo was broadcast in 2001 starring Alun Armstrong as Don Camillo, John Moffatt as the Bishop, Shaun Prendergast as Peppone and Joss Ackland as God, and rebroadcast in July 2010 on BBC Radio 7.

Four further BBC Radio series of The Little World of Don Camillo were made, with the final series broadcast on BBC Radio 4 in December 2006. Ian Hogg replaced Armstrong as Don Camillo, while Prendergast, Ackland and Moffatt all continued to reprise their roles as Peppone, God and the Bishop respectively. BBC Radio 7 broadcast the second and third series throughout August and September 2010 with the fourth series beginning on 6 October.

=== Television ===
In 1980, the BBC produced a well-received television series, The Little World of Don Camillo, based on the stories, starring Italian-German actor Mario Adorf as Don Camillo and Englishman Brian Blessed as Peppone. The narrator and Voice of the Christ was Cyril Cusack. Thirteen episodes were screened on BBC 2 at 9pm on Thursday nights from January 8th 1981 to April 2nd 1981. As of 2023, the series has not been rebroadcast or released on DVD/Blu-ray.

In Colombia the stories were adapted into a TV comedy called Don Camilo. The Italian Communist era was changed to a Colombian period called "La Violencia" when the Liberal and Conservative parties were fighting to maintain power in Colombia. The comedy was produced from 1987 to 1988 by the now defunct Coestrellas company and produced and directed by Daniel Samper Pizano and Bernando Romero Pereiro. The series starred Carlos Benjumea as Don Camillo (Don Camilo in Colombian Spanish), Hector Rivas as Peppone (Pepón in Colombian Spanish), Luis Fernando Múnera as The Christ Voice, and the actors Diego León Hoyos and Manuel Pachón as Peppone flunkies. The series was broadcast on Mondays at 10:00 pm by Cadena 2 (Señal Institucional now) and rebroadcast by Señal Colombia in 2011 and Canal Uno in 2014.

=== Thai novel ===
The Little World of Don Camillo was adapted by the Thai writer and politician Kukrit Pramoj into his own 1954 novel, Phai Daeng (Red Bamboo).

== See also ==
- Cinema of Italy
- Marcelino pan y vino also features a talking crucifix
- Monsignor Quixote (Graham Greene novel about friendship between priest and Communist mayor)
- Clochemerle (1934)

== Sources ==
- Esposito, Riccardo F. (2008). Don Camillo e Peppone. Cronache cinematografiche dalla Bassa Padana 1951–1965 (in Italian). Recco: Le Mani – Microart's. ISBN 978-88-8012-455-9..
