= Bertoldo =

Italian humor magazine (1936–1943)

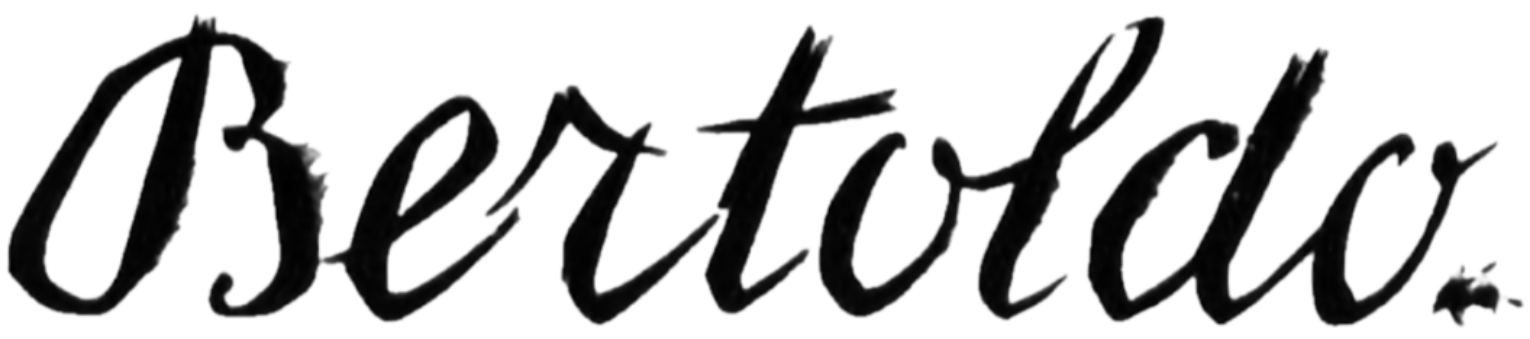
- Editor: Giovannino Guareschi
- Categories: Humour magazine
- Frequency: Biweekly
- First issue: 14 July 1936
- Final issue: 10 September 1943
- Country: Kingdom of Italy
- Based in: Milan
- Language: Italian

Bertoldo was a biweekly magazine of surreal humour that ran from 14 July 1936 to 10 September 1943 under Italian Fascism. The magazine was based in Milan. While the Becco Giallo magazine put out courageous political satire against the fascist regime, the reactionary authors of Bertoldo, like Marcello Marchesi, as well as Marc'Aurelio, developed a kind of surreal humour that was accepted by the regime.

Some of the best young artists and writers worked on the magazine. Among them were the popular author Giovannino Guareschi (1908–1968), and the Romanian Jewish architect-student (later famous American cartoonist) Saul Steinberg (1914–1999). Guareschi edited the magazine from 1936 to 1943.

Bertoldo was succeeded by another satirical magazine, Candido.
