= Giovannino Guareschi =

Italian journalist, cartoonist, and humorist (1908–1968)

Giovannino Guareschi OCI
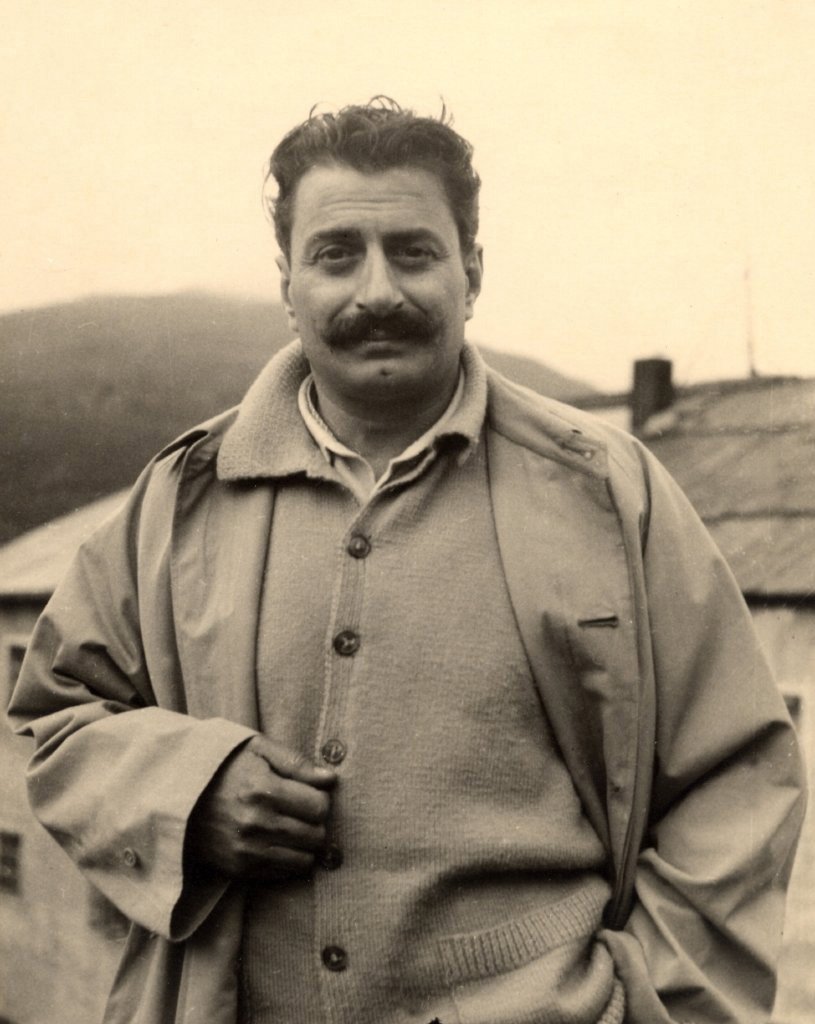
- Born: Giovannino Oliviero Giuseppe Guareschi; 1 May 1908; Roccabianca, Emilia-Romagna, Kingdom of Italy
- Died: 22 July 1968 (aged 60); Cervia, Emilia-Romagna, Italy
- Resting place: Church of St. Michael Archangel, Le Roncole
- Occupations: Writer; journalist; caricaturist; humorist; movie director
- Spouse: Ennia Pallini (m. 1940)
- Children: 2
- Writing career
- Genres: Political satire; war novel; short story
- Notable works: Character of Don Camillo; La rabbia; anti-communist cartoons
- Website: giovanninoguareschi.com

Signature
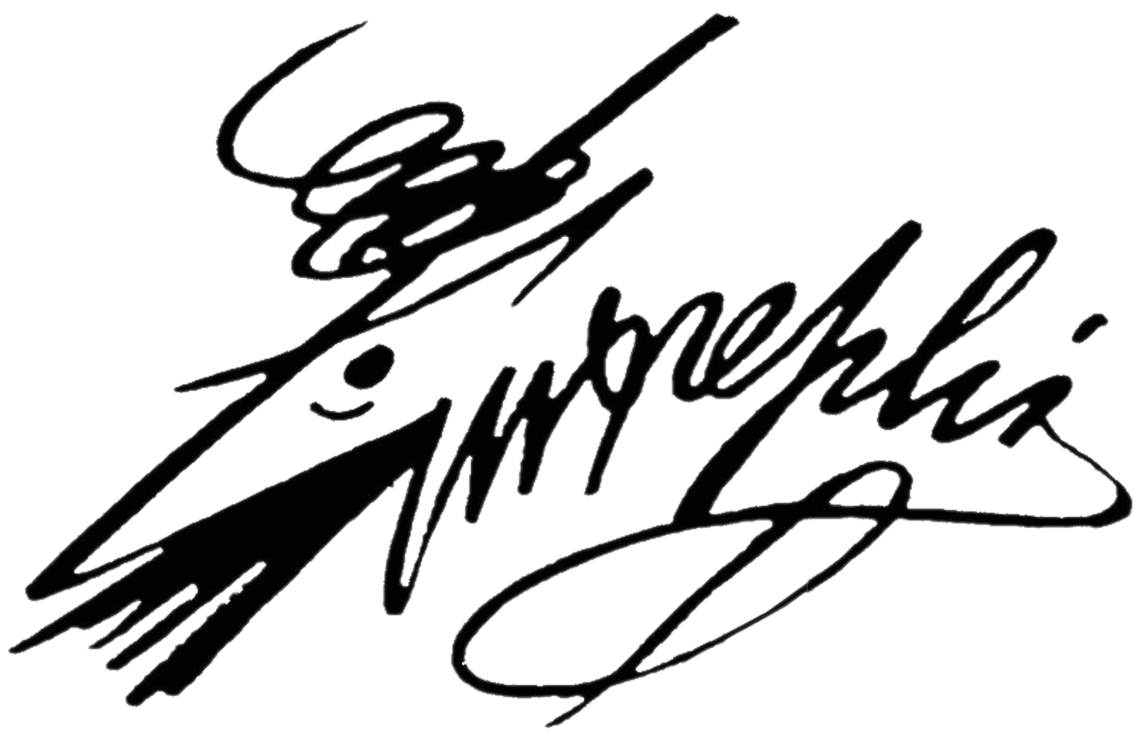

Giovannino Oliviero Giuseppe Guareschi (Italian: [dʒovanˈniːno ɡwaˈreski]; 1 May 1908 – 22 July 1968) was an Italian journalist, cartoonist and humorist whose best known creation is the priest Don Camillo.

== Life and career ==
Guareschi was born into a middle-class family in Fontanelle di Roccabianca, in the province of Parma, on 1 May 1908. He always joked about the fact that he, a big man, was baptized Giovannino, a name meaning "little John" or "Johnny". In 1926, his family went bankrupt and he could not continue his studies at the University of Parma. After working at various minor jobs, he started to write for a local newspaper, the Gazzetta di Parma. In 1929, he became editor of the satirical magazine Corriere Emiliano, and from 1936 to 1943 was the chief editor of a similar magazine called Bertoldo.

In 1943, Guareschi was drafted into the army, which apparently helped him to avoid trouble with the Italian Fascist authorities. He ended up as an artillery officer. When Italy signed the armistice of Cassibile with the Allies in 1943, he was arrested as an Italian military internee and imprisoned with other Italian soldiers in camps in German-occupied Poland for almost two years, including at Stalag X-B near Sandbostel. He later wrote about this period in Diario Clandestino (My Secret Diary).

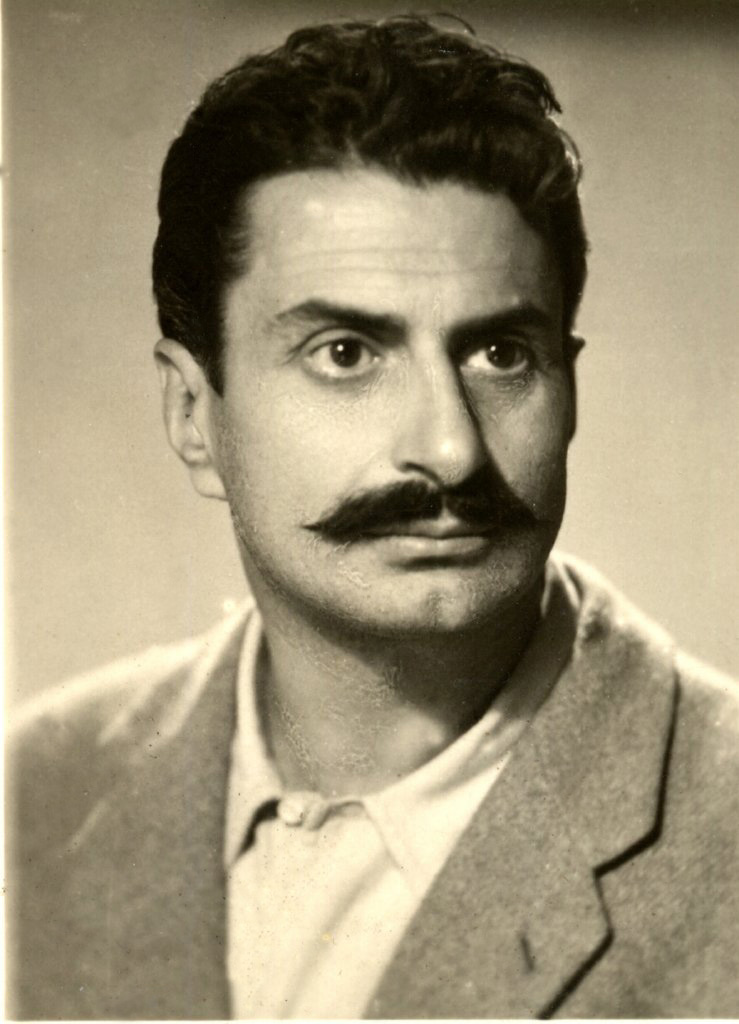
Guareschi in 1945

After the war, Guareschi returned to Italy and in 1945 founded a monarchist weekly satirical magazine, Candido. After Italy became a republic, he supported the Christian Democracy party. He criticized and satirized the Italian Communist Party in his magazine, famously drawing a Communist as a man with an extra nostril, and coining a slogan that became very popular: "Inside the voting booth God can see you, Stalin can't." When the Communists were defeated in the 1948 Italian general election, Guareschi turned a significant part of his criticism on the Christian Democracy party.

In 1950, Candido published a satirical cartoon by Carlo Manzoni poking fun at Luigi Einaudi, then president of the Republic: The president is at the Quirinal Palace, surrounded by, instead of the presidential guard of honour (the corazzieri), giant bottles of Nebbiolo wine, which Einaudi actually produced on his land in Dogliani. Each bottle was labeled with the institutional logo. The cartoon was judged "in contempt of the President" by a court at the time. Guareschi, as director of the magazine, was held responsible, indicted, and sentenced.

In 1954, Guareschi was charged with libel after publishing facsimiles of two wartime letters allegedly from resistance leader and former prime minister Alcide De Gasperi in which he requests that the Allies bomb the outskirts of Rome to demoralize Italian collaborators. The legitimacy of the letters was never established by the court; after a two-month trial, it found in favour of De Gasperi. Guareschi declined to appeal the verdict and spent 409 days in Parma's San Francesco jail, and another six months on probation at his home.

His most famous comic creations are his short stories, which he started writing in the late 1940s, about the rivalry between Don Camillo, a stalwart Italian priest, and the equally hot-headed Peppone, the Communist mayor of a Po River Valley village in the "Little World". These stories were dramatized on radio, television, and in films, most notably in the series of films featuring Fernandel as Don Camillo.

By 1956, Guareschi's health had deteriorated and he began spending time in Switzerland for treatment. In 1957, he retired as editor of Candido, though staying on as a contributor. He died in Cervia in 1968 of a heart attack at the age of 60.

== Selected bibliography ==
- La scoperta di Milano (1941)
- Il destino si chiama Clotilde (1943)
- Il marito in collegio (1944)
- Favola di natale (1945)
- Diario clandestino, 1943-1945 (1946)
- Italia provvisoria (1947)
- Lo zibaldino (1948)
- Corrierino delle famiglie (1954)
- Vita in famiglia (1968)

=== Published English translations ===
- The Little World of Don Camillo (1950)
- Don Camillo and his Flock (in US); Don Camillo and the Prodigal Son (in UK) (1952)
- The House That Nino Built (1953)
- Don Camillo's Dilemma (1954)
- Don Camillo Takes the Devil by the Tail (in US); Don Camillo and the Devil (in UK) (1957)
- My Secret Diary (1958)
- Comrade Don Camillo (1964)
- My Home, Sweet Home (1966)
- A Husband in a Boarding School (1967)
- Duncan & Clotilda: An Extravaganza with a Long Digression (1968)
- Don Camillo Meets the Flower Children (in US); Don Camillo Meets Hell's Angels (in UK) (1969)
- The Family Guareschi: Chronicles of the Past and Present (1970)

=== Complete English-language series of Don Camillo stories ===
The Guareschi family only discovered after 1980 that the original English language publishers made unauthorised cuts in the Don Camillo stories, only publishing 132 of the original 347 Italian stories. These were subsequently translated, and the entire series of short stories published by Pilot Productions. The copyright is vested in the family, and the books published so far are as follows:

- No. 1: The Complete Little World of Don Camillo (2013) ISBN 978-1900064071
- No. 2: Don Camillo and His Flock (2015) ISBN 978-1900064187
- No. 3: Don Camillo and Peppone (2016) ISBN 978-1900064262
- No. 4: Comrade Don Camillo (2017) ISBN 978-1900064330
- No. 5: Don Camillo and Company (2018) ISBN 978-1900064408
- No. 6: Don Camillo's Dilemma (2019) ISBN 978-1900064477
- No. 7: Don Camillo Takes the Devil by the Tail (2020) ISBN 978-1900064514
- No. 8: Don Camillio and Don Chichi (2021) ISBN 978-1900064569
- No. 9: Merry Christmas Don Camillo (2022) ISBN 978-1900064590
- No. 10: Don Camillo of La Bassa (2023) ISBN 978-1900064651
- No. 11: Ciao Don Camillo, Volume One (2024) ISBN 978-1900064675
- No. 12: Ciao Don Camillo, Volume Two (2025) ISBN 978-1900064699

== Filmography ==
- La rabbia, 1963. Co-director with Pier Paolo Pasolini.

=== Filmography about Don Camillo ===
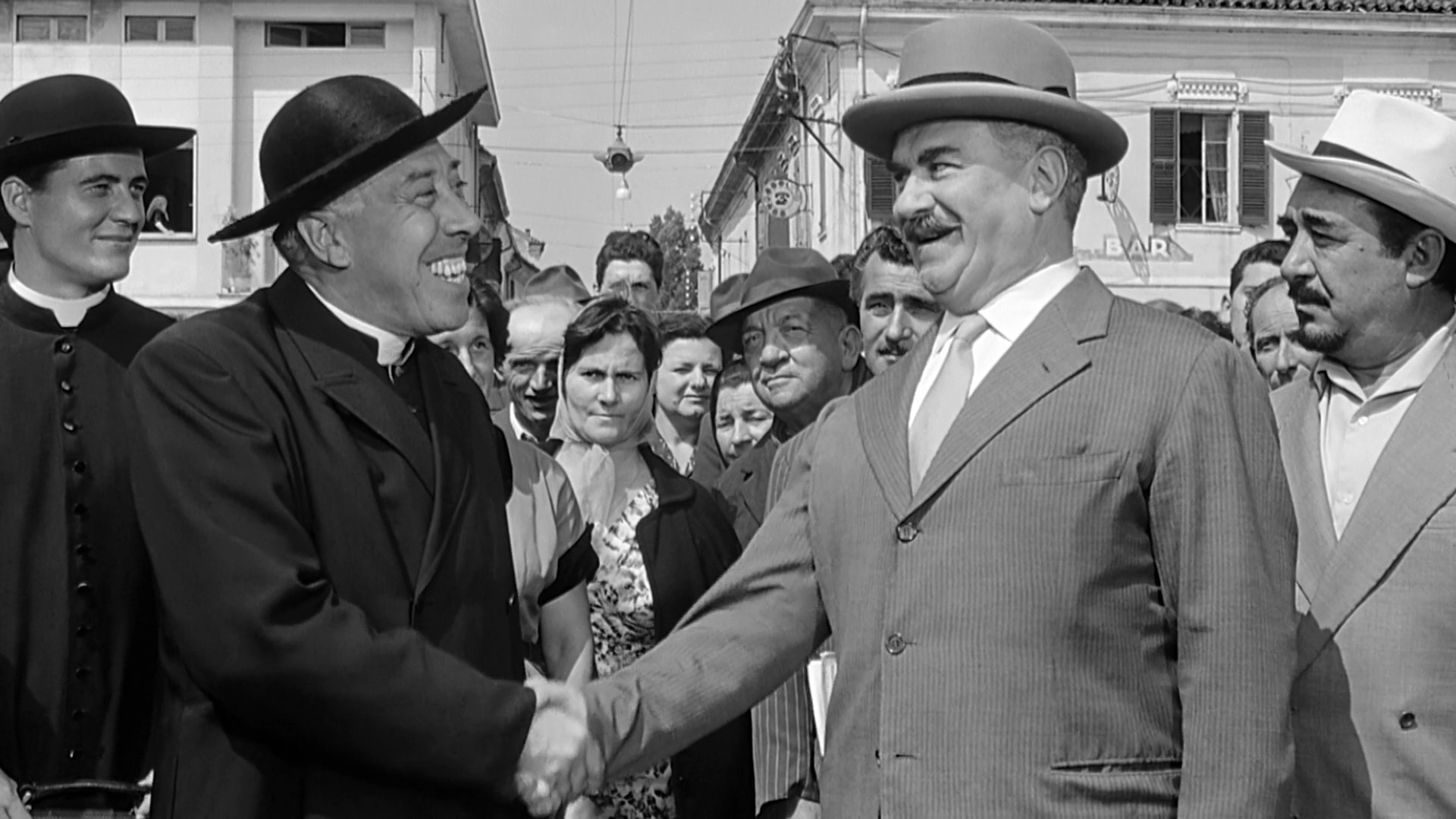
Scene from the film Don Camillo: Monsignor (1961)

- Little World of Don Camillo – Don Camillo (1952)
- The Return of Don Camillo – Il ritorno di Don Camillo (1953)
- Don Camillo's Last Round – Don Camillo e l'onorevole Peppone (1955)
- Don Camillo: Monsignor – Don Camillo Monsignore... ma non troppo! (1961)
- Don Camillo in Moscow – Il compagno Don Camillo (1965)
- Don Camillo and the today's youth – Don Camillo e i giovani d'oggi (1970), unfinished project
- Don Camillo and the today's youth – Don Camillo e i giovani d'oggi (1972)
- The World of Don Camillo – Don Camillo (1983), remake with Terence Hill and Colin Blakely

== Bibliography ==
- Perry, Alan R. (2008). The Don Camillo Stories of Giovanni Guareschi. Toronto: University of Toronto Press.
