= Don Camillo in Moscow =

1965 film

- Italian: Il compagno Don Camillo
- French: Don Camillo en Russie
- Directed by: Luigi Comencini
- Screenplay by: Piero De Bernardi
- Story by: Leo Benvenuti
- Based on: Don Camillo by Giovannino Guareschi
- Produced by: Luigi Comencini
- Starring: Fernandel, Gino Cervi; Gianni Garko; Graziella Granata
- Cinematography: Armando Nannuzzi
- Edited by: Nino Baragli
- Music by: Alessandro Cicognini
- Release date: 18 September 1965
- Running time: 109 minutes
- Countries: Italy; France; West Germany
- Languages: Italian; French; Russian

Don Camillo in Moscow (Italian: Il compagno Don Camillo, lit. 'Comrade Don Camillo'; French: Don Camillo en Russie, lit. 'Don Camillo in Russia') is a 1965 French-German-Italian comedy film directed by Luigi Comencini. It was the fifth film in the Don Camillo series.

== Plot ==
After receiving a tractor as a gift from the collective farm (kolkhoz) of an unnamed Soviet village on the Don River, Italian Communist mayor Peppone plans to twin his town Brescello with it. After some failed attempts to block the mayor's plan, the anti-Communist Don Camillo ultimately tricks Peppone into including him (under a false name and with forged papers) among the Italian Communist representatives passing through the Iron Curtain to attend the twinning ceremonies. Only Peppone and the other comrades from Brescello know the priest's real identity. During the Russian stay, they face a series of situations that will show them both the political contradictions of Soviet Russia and the normal life of its common people.

== Cast ==
- Fernandel as Don Camillo
- Gino Cervi as Giuseppe "Peppone" Bottazzi
- Leda Gloria as Maria Bottazzi
- Gianni Garko as Scamoggia
- Saro Urzì as Brusco
- Graziella Granata as Nadia
- Paul Muller as Le pope
- Marco Tulli as Smilzo
- Jacques Herlin as Perletti
- Silla Bettini as Bigio
- Aldo Vasco as Un camarade
- Alessandro Gottlieb as Ivan
- Mirko Valentin as Le faux russe
- Ettore Geri as Oregov
- Margherita Sala as La femme d'Ivan
