= Marco Tulli =

Italian actor (1920–1982)

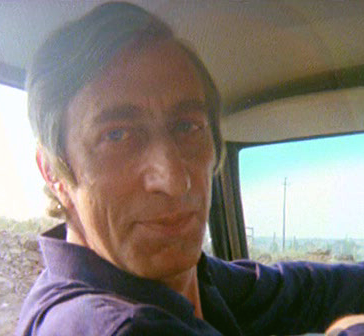
- Tulli in Blue Jeans, 1975
- Born: 20 November 1920; Rome, Italy
- Died: 20 March 1982 (aged 61); Rome, Italy
- Years active: 1947–1980

Marco Tulli (20 November 1920 – 20 March 1982) was an Italian character actor, probably best known in the role of "Smilzo" in the Don Camillo film series.

Born in Rome, Tulli debuted as actor while he was still a university student, at the end of the Second World War. He was a prolific character actor in comedy films, often playing roles of curious and nosy persons. He was also very active on stage, in which he worked with Giorgio Strehler and Luciano Lucignani, and as television actor.

== Selected filmography ==
- Flesh Will Surrender (1947)
- L'onorevole Angelina (1947) - Giacomo - the servant (uncredited)
- Lo sciopero dei milioni (1947)
- Daniele Cortis (1947) - Diego
- How I Lost the War (1947) - Ufficiale tedesco
- Baron Carlo Mazza (1948) - Padrone del contino #2
- I peggiori anni della nostra vita (1948)
- Femmina incatenata (1949) - Guido al museo
- The Elusive Twelve (1950)
- His Last Twelve Hours (1950) - Un cliente degli Gigliosi (uncredited)
- That Ghost of My Husband (1950) - Arcangelo (uncredited)
- Mamma Mia, What an Impression! (1951)
- Beauties in Capri (1952)
- The Piano Tuner Has Arrived (1952)
- The Return of Don Camillo (1953)
- Beat the Devil (1953) as Ravello
- Tears of Love (1954)
- Count Max (1957)
- It Started in Naples (1960)
- Revolt of the Mercenaries (1961)
- The Two Crusaders (1968)
