= Cinema of Europe =

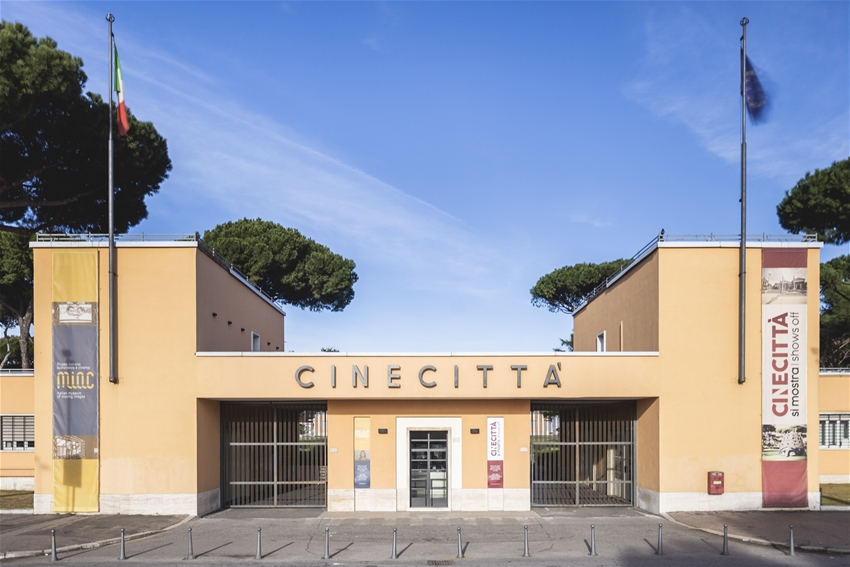
Entrance to Cinecittà in Rome, Italy, the largest film studio in Europe

Cinema of Europe refers to the film industries and films produced in the continent of Europe. The history of Italian cinema began a few months after the French Lumière brothers, who made the first public screening of a film on 28 December 1895, an event considered the birth of cinema, began motion picture exhibitions. The history of cinema in Germany can be traced back to the years of the medium's birth. Ottomar Anschütz held the first showing of life sized pictures in motion on 25 November 1894 at the Postfuhramt in Berlin. On 1 November 1895, Max Skladanowsky and his brother Emil demonstrated their self-invented film projector, the Bioscop, at the Wintergarten music hall in Berlin. A 15-minute series of eight short films were shown – the first screening of films to a paying audience. The first Italian director is considered to be Vittorio Calcina, a collaborator of the Lumière Brothers. The Lumière brothers established the Cinematograph; which initiated the silent film era, a period where European cinema was a major commercial success. It remained so until the art-hostile environment of World War II. These notable discoveries provide a glimpse of the power of early European cinema and its long-lasting influence on cinema today.

Notable European early film movements include German expressionism (1920s), Soviet montage (1920s), French impressionist cinema (1920s), and Italian neorealism (1940s); it was a period now seen in retrospect as "The Other Hollywood". War has triggered the birth of Art and in this case, the birth of cinema.

German expressionism evoked people's emotions through strange, nightmare-like visions and settings, heavily stylised and extremely visible to the eye. Soviet montage shared similarities too and created famous film edits known as the Kino-eye effect, Kuleshov effect and intellectual montage.

French impressionist cinema has crafted the essence of cinematography, as France was a film pioneering country that showcased the birth of cinema using the medium invented by the Lumière brothers. Italian neorealism designed the vivid reality through a human lens by creating low budget films outside directly on the streets of Italy. All film movements were heavily influenced by the war but that played as a catalyst to drive the cinema industry to its most potential in Europe.

The notable movements throughout early European cinema featured stylistic conventions, prominent directors and historical films that have influenced modern cinema until today. Below you will find a list of directors, films, film awards, film festivals and actors that were stars born from these film movements.

== History ==
=== 20th century ===
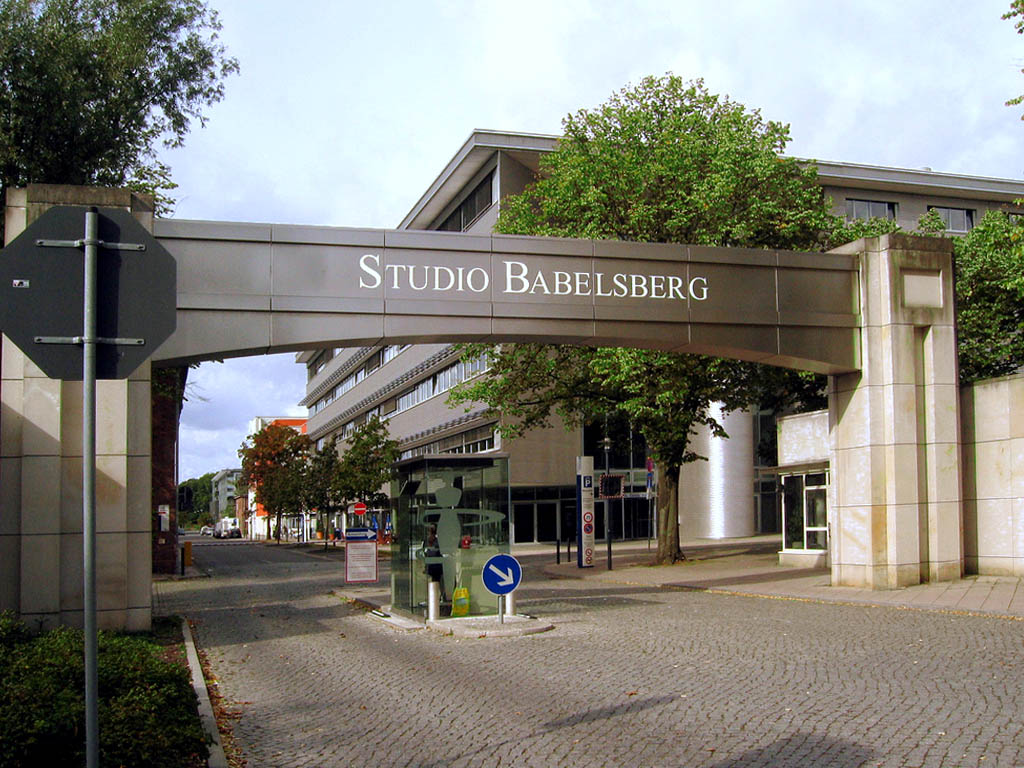
The Babelsberg Studio near Berlin, Germany, was the first large-scale film studio in the world (founded 1912) and still produces international movies every year.

According to one study, "In the 1900s the European film industry was in good shape. European film companies pioneered both technological innovations such as projection, colour processes, and talking pictures, and content innovations such as the weekly newsreel, the cartoon, the serial, and the feature film. They held a large share of the US market, which at times reached 60 percent.

The French film companies were quick in setting up foreign production and distribution subsidiaries in European countries and the US and dominated international film distribution before the mid-1910s. By the early 1920s, all this had changed. The European film industry only held a marginal share of the US market and a small share of its home markets. Most large European companies sold their foreign subsidiaries and exited from film production at home, while the emerging Hollywood studios built their foreign distribution networks."

The European Film Academy was founded in 1988 to celebrate European cinema through the European Film Awards annually.

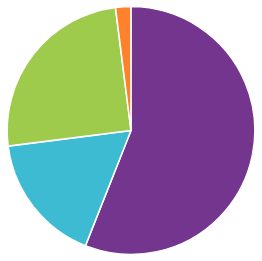
When Europeans go the cinema, what do they watch? (1996–2016) US Films (56%) European films (25%) US/European co-productions (17%) Other films (2%)

==== Europa Cinemas ====
Founded on 12 February 1991 with funding from the MEDIA programme Creative Europe and from the CNC, France, Europa Cinemas is the first film theatre network focusing on European films. Its objective is to provide operational and financial support to cinemas that commit themselves to screen a significant number of European non-national films, to offer events and initiatives as well as promotional activities targeted at young audiences.

As of September 2020, Europa Cinemas had 3,131 screens across 1,216 cinemas, located in 738 cities and 43 countries. The president in 2024/2025 is Mathias Holtz, while Claude-Eric Poiroux is honorary president.

=== 21st century ===
On 2 February 2000 Philippe Binant realised the first digital cinema projection in Europe, with the DLP Cinema technology developed by Texas Instruments, in Paris.

Today US productions dominate the European market. On average European films are distributed in only two or three countries; US productions in nearly ten. The top ten most watched films in Europe between 1996 and 2016 were all US productions or co-productions. Excluding US productions, the most watched movie in that period was The Intouchables, a French production, like most of the other movies in the top ten. In 2016–2017 the only (partially) European film in the top ten of the most watched films in Europe was Dunkirk. Excluding it (which was a Netherlands, UK, France and US co-production) the European film with the best results was Paddington 2, which sold 9.1 million tickets.

== French cinema ==
=== Early French cinema ===
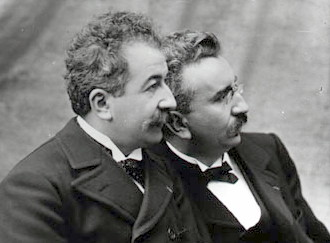
Lumiére brothers

Like the other forms of art, film cinema portrays the authenticity that faces several people. France can be considered one of the main pioneers of the entire global film industry. The proof of this claim that between 1895–1905 France invented the concept of cinema when the Lumière brothers first film screened on 28 December 1895, called The Arrival of a Train at La Ciotat Station, in Paris.

It lasted only 50 seconds but it launched and gave birth to the new medium of expression in the film industry. Lumiére from France has been credited since 1895 and was recognized as the discoverer of the motion camera. However, despite other inventors preceding him, his achievement is often believed to be in the perspective of this creative era.

Lumiere's suitcase-sized cinematography, which was movable served as a film dispensation unit, camera, and projector all in one. During the 1890s, film cinemas became a few minutes long and commenced to consist of various shots too. Other pioneers were also French including Niépce, Daguerre, and Marey, during the 1880s they were able to combine science and art together to launch the film industry.

The pioneers of the French film were influenced by their historical heritage stemming from the need to express the narrative of a nation. The 19th century in France was a period of nationalism launched by the French Revolution (1789–1792). Marey (1830- 1904) invented the photo gun (1882) which was developed to function and be able to have a photographic paper of 150 images in motion. Emile Reynaud 1844-1918 was the founding father of animation.

The short-animated film Pantomimes Lumineuses exhibited during 1892 at the Musee Grevin was developed as a result of his invention, the Praxinoscope projector. This invention brought together colour and hand-drawn drawings. Gaumont was established as France's first film studio before Pathé and founded by Léon Gaumont (1864-1946). In 1907, Gaumont was the largest movie studio in the world, it also prompted the work of the first female filmmaker Guy-Blachéwho created the film L'enfant de la barricade.

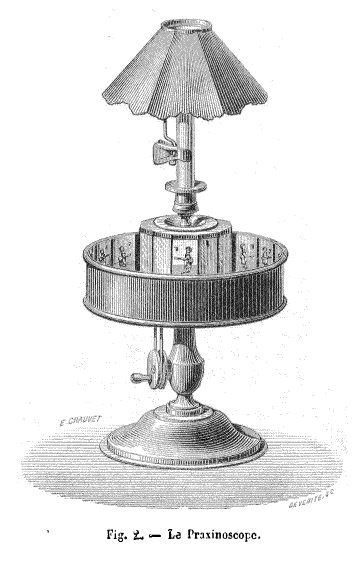
Praxinoscope invented by Reynaud

=== Pre-and Post-World War I French Cinema ===
The pre-World War I period marked the influences of France's historical past with film not only galvanizing a period of advances in science and engineering but a need for a film to become a platform to explore the narrative of their culture and in doing so created a narcissistic platform. Before World War I, French and Italian cinema dominated the European cinema. Zecca, the director general at Pathé Frères perfected the comic version of the chase film which was inspired by Keystone Kops. Besides, Max Linder created a comic persona that profoundly influenced Charlie Chaplin's work.

Other films that began pre-war in France also included The Assassination of the Duke of Guise as well as the film d'art movement in 1908. These films depicted the realities of human life especially within the European society. Moreover, French film produced costume spectacles that raised attention and brought global prominence before the start of World War I.

Approximately 70% of the global films were imported from Paris studios from Éclair, Gaumont, and Pathe before the war. However, as WWI commenced, the French film industry declined during the war because it lost many of its resources which were drained away to support the war. Besides, WWI blocked the exportation of French films forcing it to reduce large productions to pay attention to low finance film-making.

However, in the years that followed the war, American films increasingly entered the French market because the American film industry was not affected by the war as much. This meant that a total of 70% of Hollywood films were screened in France. During this period, the French film industry faced a crisis as the number of its produced features decreased and they were surpassed by their competitors including the United States of America and Germany.

=== Post World War II French cinema ===
After the end of World War II, the French cinema art commenced its formation of the modern image as well as recognizing its after-impacts. Following the establishment and growth of the American and German film industries during the post-WWI era as well as during Great Depression. Many German and American movies had taken the stage of the French and global market. Moreover, during WWII, the French film industry focused mainly on the production of anti-Nazi movies especially during the late 1940s as the war came to an end.

After this era, French film industry directors commenced addressing the issues affecting humanism as well focused on the production of high-eminence entertaining films. In addition, the screening of French literary classics involved La Charterhouse and Rouge et le Noir attained spread great fame across the globe. Besides, Nowell-Smith (2017) asserts that one of the core cinema works that gained popularity during that period was Resnais' directed movie, Mon Amour. This led to Cannes hosting their first international film festival receiving the annual status.

=== Styles and conventions in French cinema ===
The French New Wave which was accompanied by its cinematic forms led to a fresh look to the French cinema. The cinema had improvised dialogue, swift scene changes and shots that went past the standard 180 degrees axis. Besides, the camera was not utilized to captivate the audience with a detailed narrative and extreme visuals but instead was used to play with the anticipations of the cinema. Classically, conventions highlighted tense control over the film making procedure. Besides, the New Wave intentionally shunned this. Movies were usually shot in public locations with invented dialogue and plots built on the fly.

In several means, it appeared sloppy, but it also captured an enthusiasm and impulsiveness that no famous film could expect to equate. Moreover, the filmmakers of the French New Wave usually abandoned the utilization of remixing their sound. Instead, they utilized a naturalist soundtrack recorded during the capture and illustrated unaltered even though it included intrusions and mistakes. Besides, it lent the film a sense of freshness and energy like their other skills that were not in past films. They used hand-held cameras which could shoot well in tight quarters generating a familiarity that more costly and more burdensome cameras could not rival. A majority of the New Wave films used long, extended shots which were facilitated by these kinds of cameras. Lastly, French films used jump cuts which threw the viewers out of the onscreen drama, unlike the traditional film making.

=== Avant-garde ===
This was the French impressionist cinema which denotes to a cluster of French movies and filmmakers of the 1920s. These filmmakers, however, are believed to be responsible for producing cinemas that defined cinema. The movement happened between 1918 and 1930 a period that saw rapid growth and change of the French and global cinema. One of the main stimulations behind the French impressionist avant-garde was to discover the impression of "pure cinema" and to style film into an art form, and as an approach of symbolism and demonstration rather than merely telling a story.

This avant-garde highlighted the association amongst realism and the camera. This was a result of "photogenie", Epstein's conception on discovering the impression of reality specifically through the camera, emphasizing the fact that it portrays personality in film. The obvious film techniques utilized by the French impressionist avant-garde are slow-motion, soft-focus, dissolves, and image alteration to develop the creative expression.

=== Prominent French impressionist film directors ===
- Louis Delluc
- Marcel L'Herbier
- Germaine Dulac
- Jean Epstein
- Jean Renoir
- Abel Gance

=== Famous French impressionist films ===
- Nana (1926) directed by Jean Renoir
- La Femme De Nulle Part (1922) directed by Louis Delluc
- The Smiling Madame Beudet (1922) directed by Germaine Dulac
- La Dixiéme Symphonie (1918) directed by Abel Gance
- J'Accuse (1919) directed by Abel Gance
- La Roue (1923) directed by Abel Gance
- Coeur Fidéle (1923) directed by Jean Epstein
- El Dorado (1921) directed by Marcel L'Herbier
- Napoléon (1927) directed by Abel Gance

== Italian cinema ==
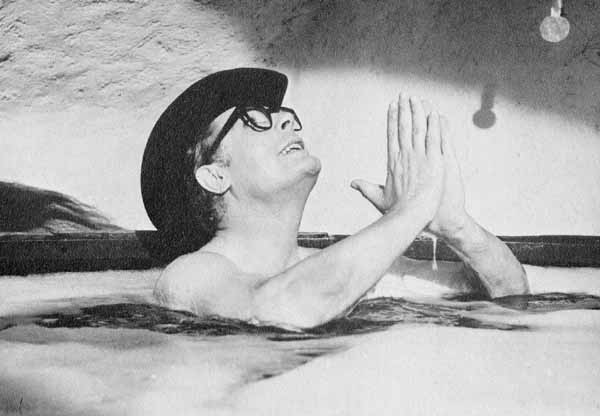
Marcello Mastroianni in 8½ (1963) by Federico Fellini, considered one of the greatest films of all time

Since its beginning, Italian cinema has influenced film movements worldwide. Italy is one of the birthplaces of art cinema and the stylistic aspect of film has been one of the most important factors in the history of Italian film. Italy is the most awarded country at the Academy Awards for Best Foreign Language Film, with 14 wins, 3 Special Awards and 31 nominations. As of 2016, Italian films have won 12 Palmes d'Or, 11 Golden Lions, and 7 Golden Bears. The country is also famed for its prestigious Venice Film Festival, the oldest film festival in the world, held annually since 1932 and awarding the Golden Lion. The David di Donatello Awards are one of the most prestigious awards at national level. Presented by the Accademia del Cinema Italiano in the Cinecittà studios, during the awards ceremony, the winners are given a miniature reproduction of the famous statue. The finalist candidates for the award, as per tradition, are first received at the Quirinal Palace by the President of Italy. The event is the Italian equivalent of the American Academy Awards.

=== Early period ===
Italian cinema began just after the Lumière brothers introduced motion picture exhibitions. The first Italian director is considered to be Vittorio Calcina, a collaborator of the Lumière Brothers later active from 1896 to 1905. The first films date back to 1896 and were made in the main cities of the Italian Peninsula. These brief experiments immediately met the curiosity of the popular class, encouraging operators to produce new films until they laid the foundations for the birth of a true film industry. In the early 1900s, artistic and epic films such as Otello (1906), The Last Days of Pompeii (1908), L'Inferno (1911), Quo Vadis (1913), and Cabiria (1914), were made as adaptations of books or stage plays. Italian filmmakers were using complex set designs, lavish costumes, and record budgets, to produce pioneering films. Lost in the Dark, silent drama film directed by Nino Martoglio and produced in 1914, documented life in the slums of Naples, and is considered a precursor to the Italian neorealism movement of the 1940s and 1950s. The only surviving copy of this film was destroyed by Nazi German forces during the World War II. This film is based on a 1901 play of the same title by Roberto Bracco. In the early years of the 20th century, silent cinema developed, bringing numerous Italian stars to the forefront until the end of World War I.

Video of Il finto storpio al Castello Sforzesco ("The fake cripple at the Castello Sforzesco") by Italo Pacchioni (1896)

Video of La presa di Roma ("The Capture of Rome") by Filoteo Alberini (1905, six minute version)

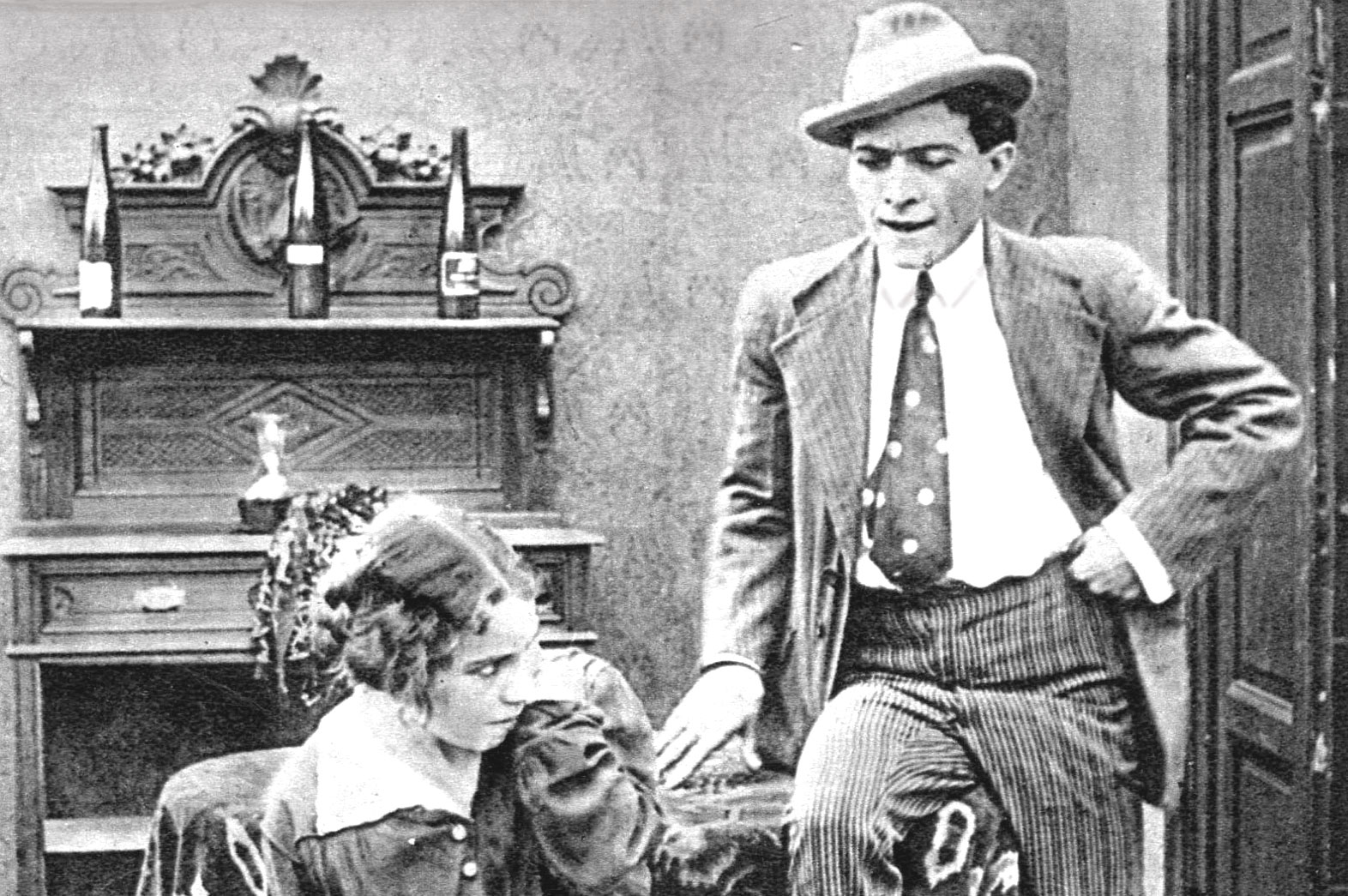
Lost in the Dark by Nino Martoglio (1914), considered a precursor to the Italian neorealism movement of the 1940s and 1950s

=== Futurist cinema ===
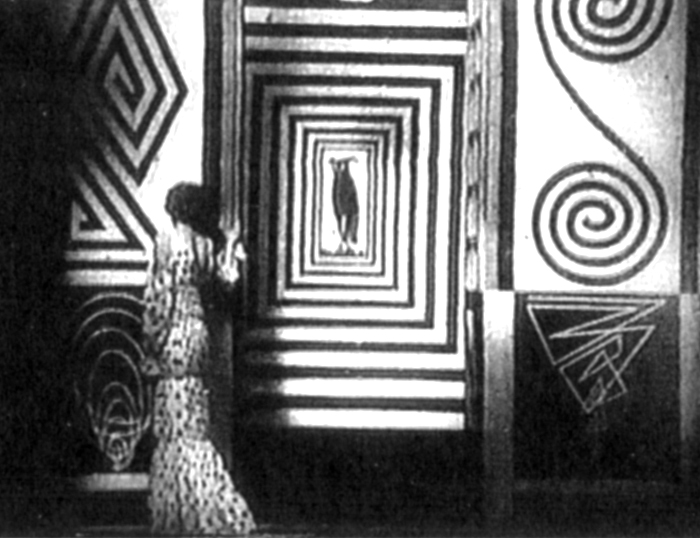
Thaïs by Anton Giulio Bragaglia (1917)

Italian futurist cinema was the oldest movement of European avant-garde cinema. Italian futurism, an artistic and social movement, impacted the Italian film industry from 1916 to 1919. It influenced Russian Futurist cinema and German Expressionist cinema. Its cultural importance was considerable and influenced all subsequent avant-gardes, as well as some authors of narrative cinema; its echo expands to the dreamlike visions of some films by Alfred Hitchcock.

Futurism emphasized dynamism, speed, technology, youth, violence, and objects such as the car, the airplane, and the industrial city. Its key figures were the Italians Filippo Tommaso Marinetti, Umberto Boccioni, Carlo Carrà, Fortunato Depero, Gino Severini, Giacomo Balla, and Luigi Russolo. It glorified modernity and aimed to liberate Italy from the weight of its past.

The 1916 Manifesto of Futuristic Cinematography was signed by Filippo Tommaso Marinetti, Armando Ginna, Bruno Corra, Giacomo Balla and others. To the Futurists, cinema was an ideal art form, being a fresh medium, and able to be manipulated by speed, special effects and editing. Most of the futuristic-themed films of this period have been lost, but critics cite Thaïs (1917) by Anton Giulio Bragaglia as one of the most influential, serving as the main inspiration for German Expressionist cinema in the following decade.

The Italian film industry struggled against rising foreign competition in the years following World War I. Several major studios, among them Cines and Ambrosio, formed the Unione Cinematografica Italiana to coordinate a national strategy for film production. This effort was largely unsuccessful, however, due to a wide disconnect between production and exhibition (some movies weren't released until several years after they were produced).

=== Neorealism ===
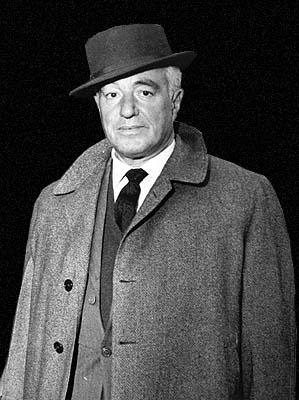
Vittorio De Sica, a leading figure in the neorealist movement and one of the world's most acclaimed and influential filmmakers of all time

By the end of World War II, the Italian "neorealist" movement had begun to take shape. Neorealist films typically dealt with the working class (in contrast to the Telefoni Bianchi), and were shot on location. Many neorealist films, but not all, used non-professional actors. Though the term "neorealism" was used for the first time to describe Luchino Visconti’s 1943 film, Ossessione, there were several important precursors to the movement, most notably Camerini's What Scoundrels Men Are! (1932), which was the first Italian film shot entirely on location, and Blasetti's 1942 film, Four Steps in the Clouds.

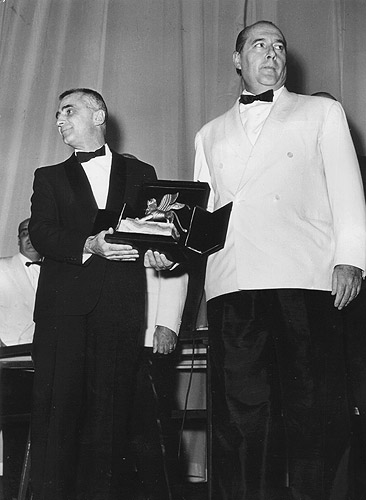
Roberto Rossellini and Mario Monicelli winning the Golden Lion for General Della Rovere and The Great War respectively

Ossessione angered Fascist officials. Upon viewing the film, Vittorio Mussolini is reported to have shouted, "This is not Italy!" before walking out of the theatre. The film was subsequently banned in the Fascist-controlled parts of Italy. While neorealism exploded after the war and was incredibly influential at the international level, neorealist films made up only a small percentage of Italian films produced during this period, as postwar Italian moviegoers preferred escapist comedies starring actors such as Totò and Alberto Sordi.

Neorealist works such as Roberto Rossellini's trilogy Rome, Open City (1945), Paisà (1946), and Germany, Year Zero (1948), with professional actors such as Anna Magnani and a number of non-professional actors, attempted to describe the difficult economic and moral conditions of postwar Italy and the changes in public mentality in everyday life. Visconti's The Earth Trembles (1948) was shot on location in a Sicilian fishing village and used local non-professional actors. Giuseppe De Santis, on other hand, used actors such as Silvana Mangano and Vittorio Gassman in his 1949 film, Bitter Rice, which is set in the Po Valley during rice-harvesting season.

Poetry and cruelty of life were harmonically combined in the works that Vittorio De Sica wrote and directed together with screenwriter Cesare Zavattini, among them: Shoeshine (1946), The Bicycle Thief (1948) and Miracle in Milan (1951). The 1952 film Umberto D. displays a poor old man with his little dog, who must beg for alms against his dignity in the loneliness of the new society. This work is perhaps De Sica's masterpiece and can be considered as one of the most important works in Italian cinema. Nevertheless, it was not a commercial success, and has been shown on Italian television only a few times since then. Yet it is considered, perhaps, one of the most notorious political attacks, in the apparent quietness of the action, against the rules of the new economy, the new mentality, and the new values, as it embodies both a conservative and a progressive view.

Although Umberto D. is considered the end of the neorealist period, later films such as Federico Fellini's La Strada (1954) and De Sica's 1960 film Two Women (for which Sophia Loren won the Oscar for Best Actress) are grouped with the genre. Director Pier Paolo Pasolini's first film, Accattone (1961), shows a strong neorealist influence. Italian neorealist cinema influenced filmmakers around the world, and helped inspire other film movements, such as the French New Wave and the Polish Film School. The Neorealist period is often simply referred to as "The Golden Age" of Italian cinema by critics, filmmakers, and scholars.

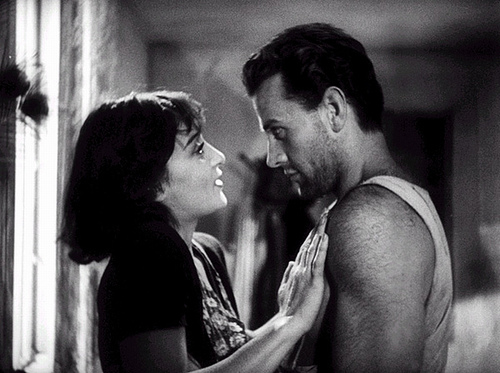
Ossessione (1943), by Luchino Visconti

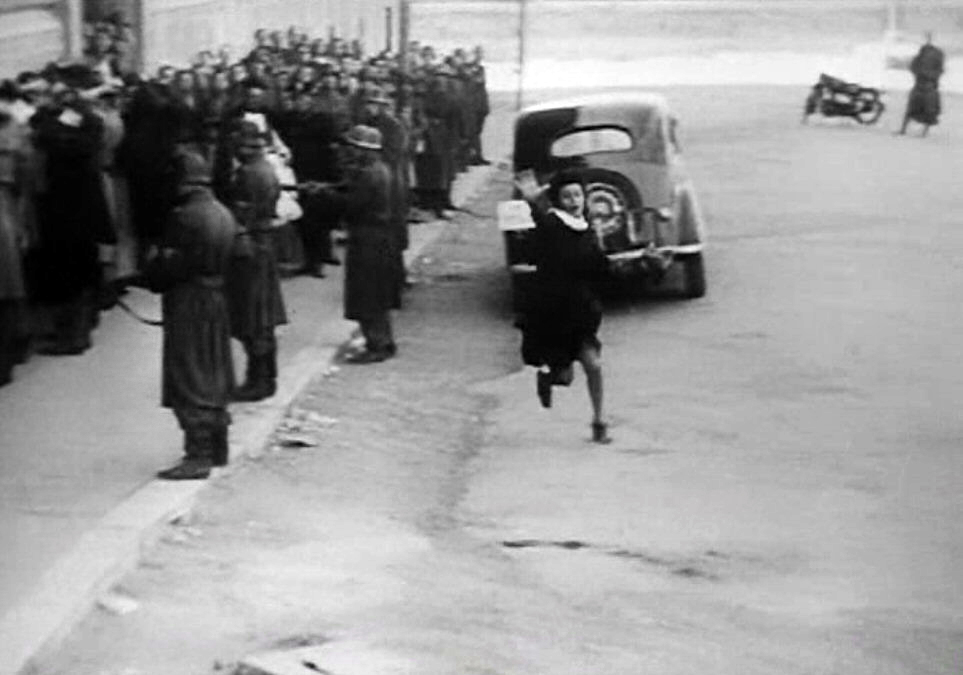
A still shot from Rome, Open City (1945), by Roberto Rossellini

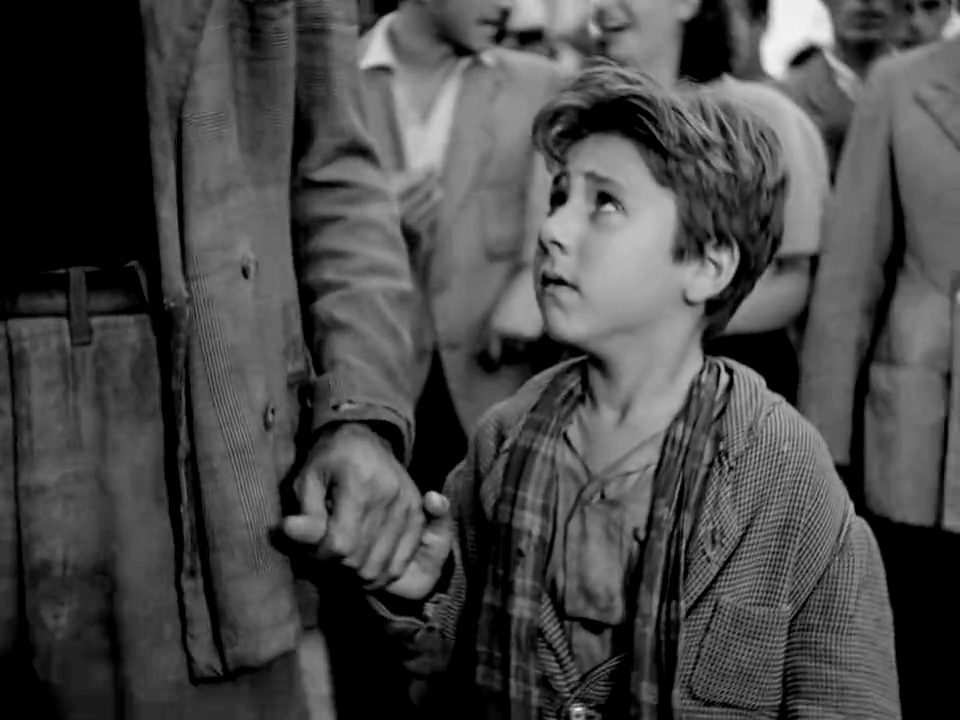
Bicycle Thieves (1948), by Vittorio De Sica, ranked among the best movies ever made and part of the canon of classic cinema

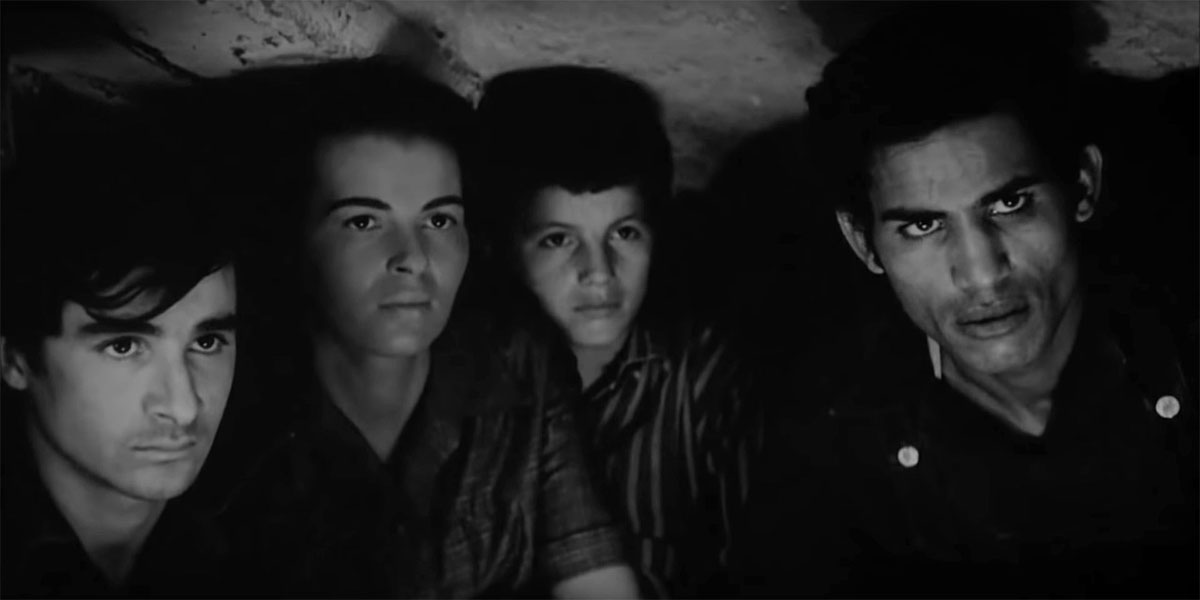
Gillo Pontecorvo's The Battle of Algiers (1966) is often associated with Italian neorealism.

=== Federico Fellini ===
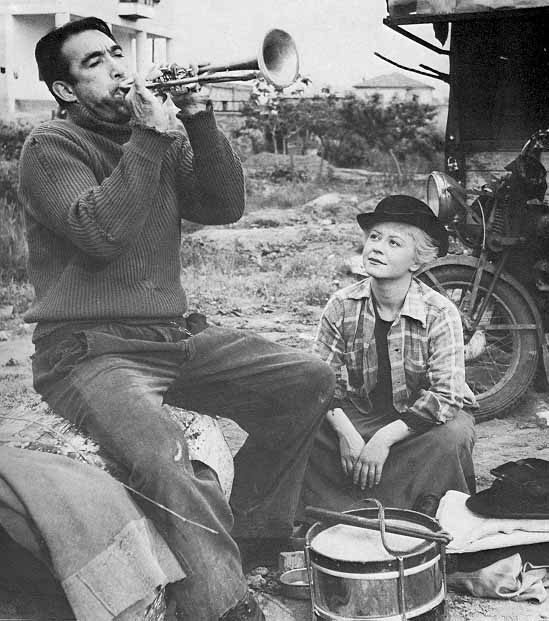
La Strada by Federico Fellini (1954), starring Anthony Quinn, Richard Basehart and Giulietta Masina

Federico Fellini is recognized as one of the greatest and most influential filmmakers of all time. Fellini won the Palme d'Or for La Dolce Vita, was nominated for twelve Academy Awards, and won four in the category of Best Foreign Language Film, the most for any director in the history of the academy. He received an honorary award for Lifetime Achievement at the 65th Academy Awards in Los Angeles. His other well-known films include La Strada (1954), Nights of Cabiria (1957), Juliet of the Spirits (1967), Satyricon (1969), Roma (1972), Amarcord (1973), and Fellini's Casanova (1976).

Personal and highly idiosyncratic visions of society, Fellini's films are a unique combination of memory, dreams, fantasy and desire. The adjectives "Fellinian" and "Felliniesque" are "synonymous with any kind of extravagant, fanciful, even baroque image in the cinema and in art in general". La Dolce Vita contributed the term paparazzi to the English language, derived from Paparazzo, the photographer friend of journalist Marcello Rubini (Marcello Mastroianni).

Contemporary filmmakers such as Tim Burton, Terry Gilliam, Emir Kusturica, and David Lynch have cited Fellini's influence on their work.

=== Commedia all'Italiana ===
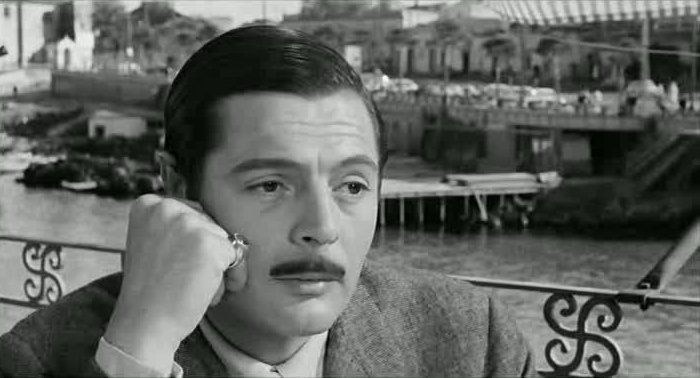
Divorce Italian Style by Pietro Germi (1961)

Commedia all'italiana ("Comedy in the Italian way") is an Italian film genre born in Italy in the 1950s and developed in the following 1960s and 1970s. It is widely considered to have started with Mario Monicelli's Big Deal on Madonna Street in 1958 and derives its name from the title of Pietro Germi's Divorce Italian Style, 1961. According to most of the critics, La Terrazza by Ettore Scola (1980) is the last work considered part of the Commedia all'italiana.

Rather than a specific genre, the term indicates a period (approximately from the late 1950s to the early 1970s) in which the Italian film industry was producing many successful comedies, with some common traits like satire of manners, farcical and grotesque overtones, a strong focus on "spicy" social issues of the period (like sexual matters, divorce, contraception, marriage of the clergy, the economic rise of the country and its various consequences, the traditional religious influence of the Catholic Church) and a prevailing middle-class setting, often characterized by a substantial background of sadness and social criticism that diluted the comic contents.

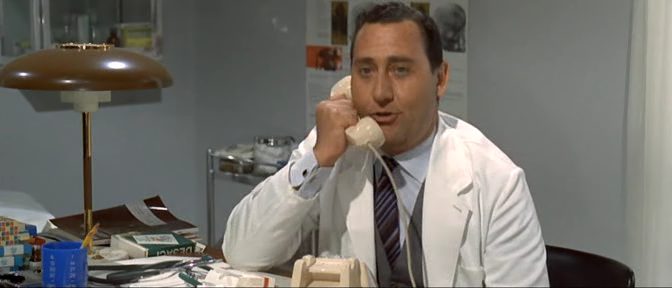
Be Sick... It's Free by Luigi Zampa (1968)

The genre of Commedia all'italiana differs markedly from the light and disengaged comedy from the so-called "pink neorealism" trend, in vogue until all of the 1950s, since, starting from the lesson of neorealism, is based on a more frank adherence in writing to reality; therefore, alongside the comic situations and plots typical of traditional comedy, always combines, with irony, a biting and sometimes bitter satire of manners, which reflects the evolution of Italian society in those years.

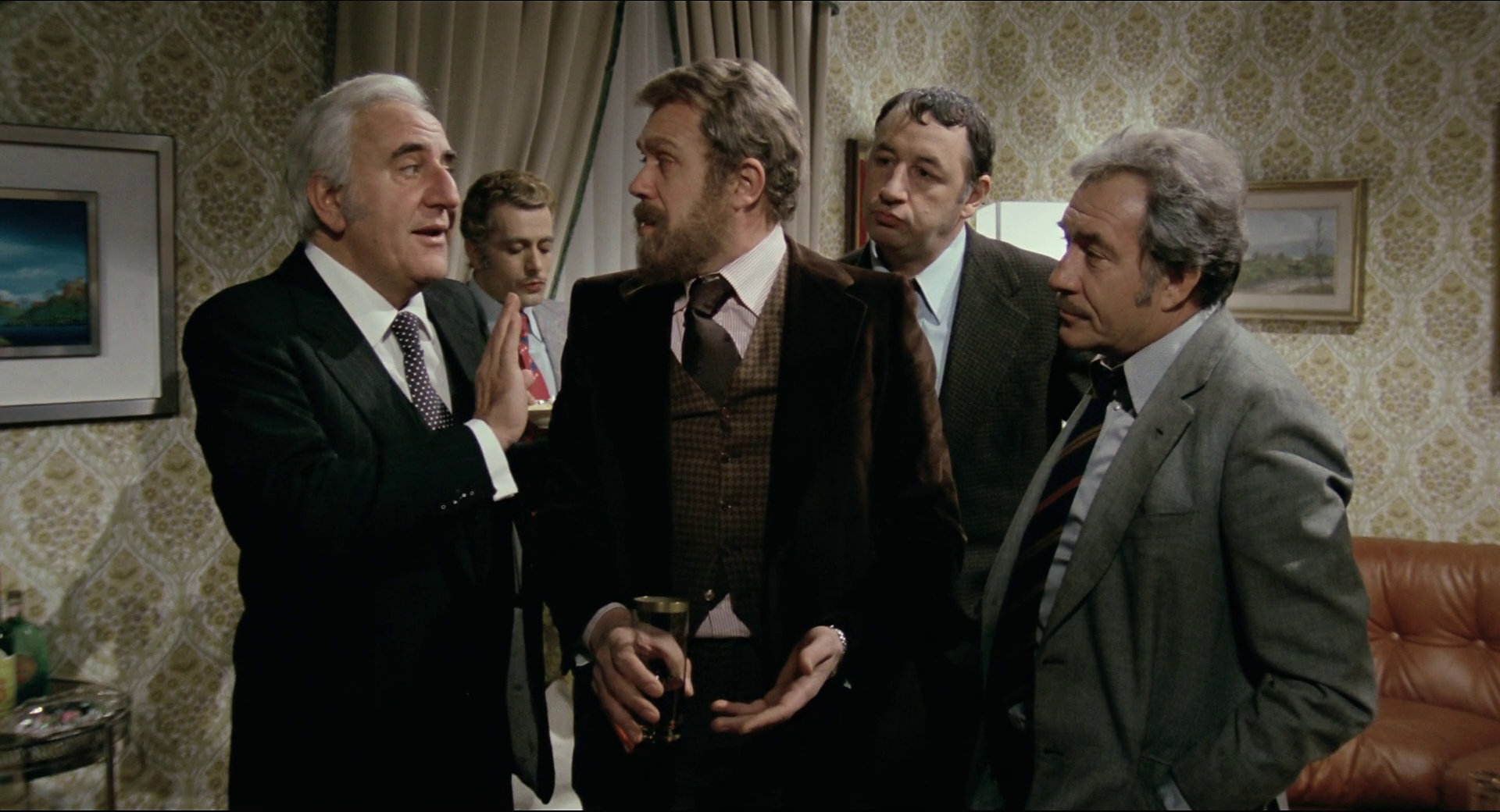
My Friends by Mario Monicelli (1975)

The success of films belonging to the "Commedia all'italiana" genre is due to the presence of skilled actors, able to embody the vices, virtues, and attempts at emancipation of the Italians of their time, and to the work of those directors and storytellers who invented the genre, managing to find material for their cinematographic creations in the folds of a rapidly evolving and contradictory social context.

Among the actors the main representatives are Alberto Sordi, Ugo Tognazzi, Vittorio Gassman, Marcello Mastroianni and Nino Manfredi, while among the actresses is Monica Vitti. Among directors and films, in 1961 Dino Risi directed Una vita difficile (A Difficult Life), then Il Sorpasso (The Easy Life), now a cult-movie, followed by: I Mostri (The Monsters, also known as 15 From Rome), In nome del popolo italiano (In the Name of the Italian People) and Profumo di donna (Scent of a Woman). Monicelli's works include La grande guerra (The Great War), I compagni (The Organizer), L'armata Brancaleone, Vogliamo i colonnelli (We Want the Colonels), Romanzo popolare (Come Home and Meet My Wife) and the Amici miei (My Friends) series.

For the majority of critics the true and proper "Commedia all'italiana" is to be considered definitively waned since the beginning of the 1980s, giving way, at most, to an "Commedia italiana" ("Italian comedy").

=== Spaghetti Western ===
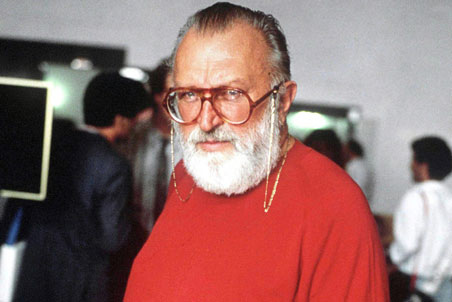
Sergio Leone, widely regarded as one of the most influential directors in the history of cinema

On the heels of the sword-and-sandal craze, a related genre, the Spaghetti Western arose and was popular both in Italy and elsewhere. These films differed from traditional westerns by being filmed in Europe on limited budgets, but featured vivid cinematography. The term was used by foreign critics because most of these westerns were produced and directed by Italians.

The most popular Spaghetti Westerns were those of Sergio Leone, credited as the inventor of the genre, whose Dollars Trilogy (1964's A Fistful of Dollars, an unauthorized remake of the Japanese film Yojimbo by Akira Kurosawa; 1965's For a Few Dollars More, an original sequel; and 1966's The Good, the Bad and the Ugly, a World-famous prequel), featuring Clint Eastwood as a character marketed as "the Man with No Name" and notorious scores by Ennio Morricone, came to define the genre along with Once Upon a Time in the West (1968).

Another popular Spaghetti Western film is Sergio Corbucci Django (1966), starring Franco Nero as the titular character, another Yojimbo plagiarism, produced to capitalize on the success of A Fistful of Dollars. The original Django was followed by both an authorized sequel (1987's Django Strikes Again) and an overwhelming number of unauthorized uses of the same character in other films.

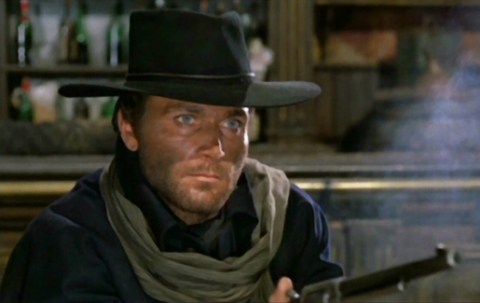
Franco Nero as Django in the film of the same name by Sergio Corbucci (1966)

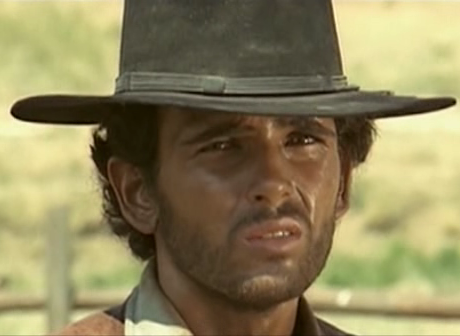
The Forgotten Pistolero by Ferdinando Baldi (1969)

=== Giallo ===
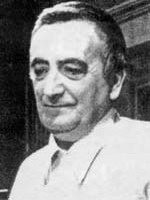
Mario Bava, referred to as the "Master of Italian Horror" and the "Master of the Macabre"

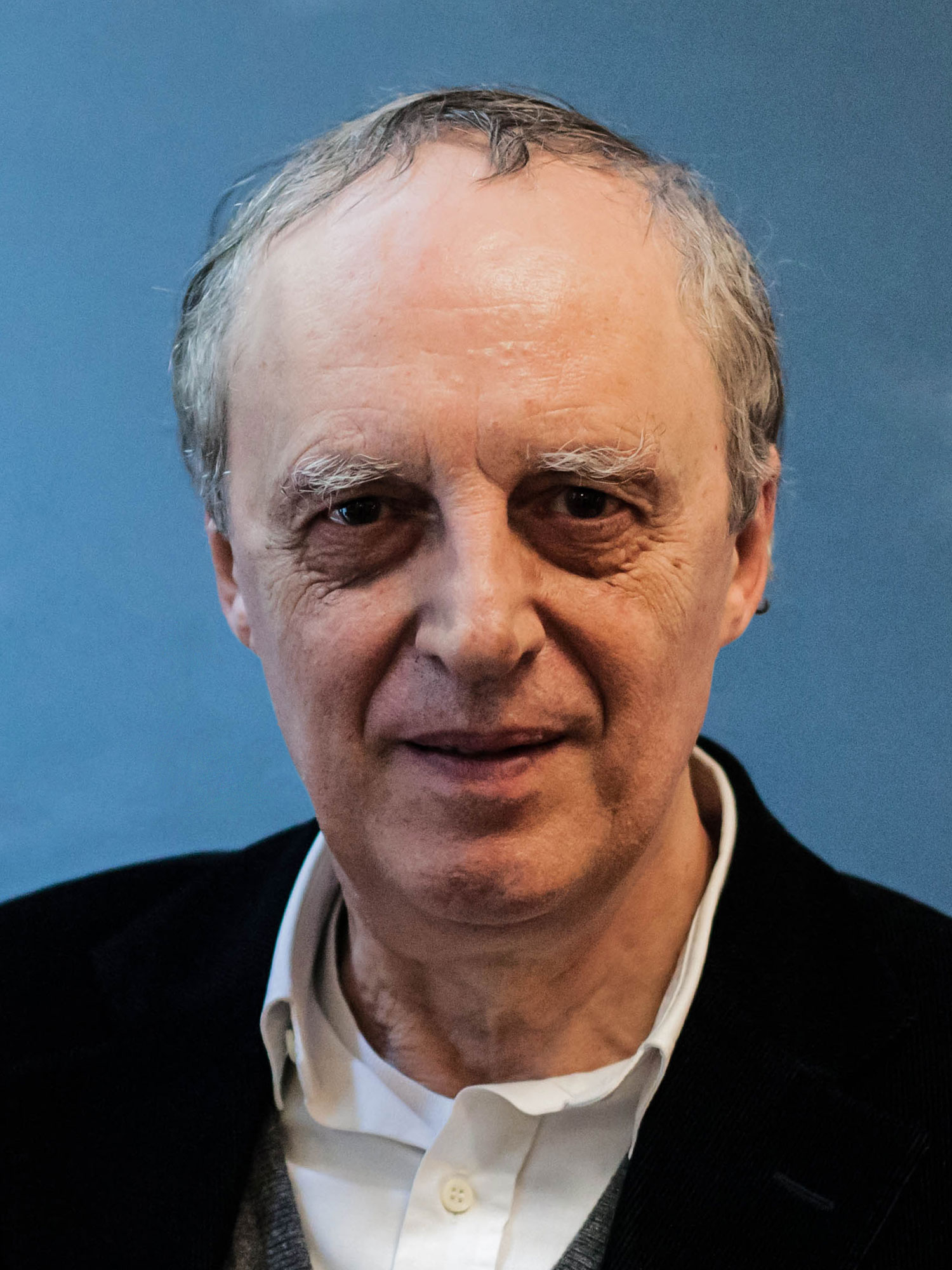
Dario Argento, referred to as the "Master of the Thrill" and the "Master of Horror"

During the 1960s and 1970s, Italian filmmakers Mario Bava, Riccardo Freda, Antonio Margheriti and Dario Argento developed giallo (plural gialli, from giallo, Italian for "yellow") horror films that become classics and influenced the genre in other countries. Representative films include: The Girl Who Knew Too Much (1963), Castle of Blood (1964), The Bird with the Crystal Plumage (1970), Twitch of the Death Nerve (1971), Deep Red (1975) and Suspiria (1977).

Giallo is a genre of mystery fiction and thrillers and often contains slasher, crime fiction, psychological thriller, psychological horror, sexploitation, and, less frequently, supernatural horror elements. Giallo developed in the mid-to-late 1960s, peaked in popularity during the 1970s, and subsequently declined in commercial mainstream filmmaking over the next few decades, though examples continue to be produced. It was a predecessor to, and had significant influence on, the later American slasher film genre.

Giallo usually blends the atmosphere and suspense of thriller fiction with elements of horror fiction (such as slasher violence) and eroticism (similar to the French fantastique genre), and often involves a mysterious killer whose identity is not revealed until the final act of the film. Most critics agree that the giallo represents a distinct category with unique features, but there is some disagreement on what exactly defines a giallo film.

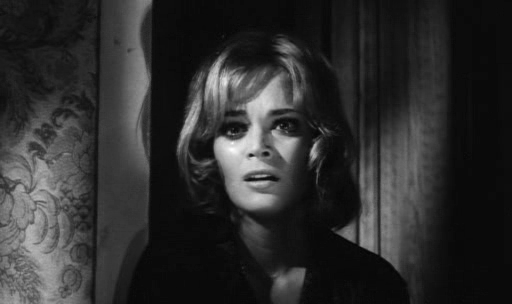
The Girl Who Knew Too Much by Mario Bava (1963), considered by most critics to be the first giallo film

Giallo films are generally characterized as gruesome murder-mystery thrillers that combine the suspense elements of detective fiction with scenes of shocking horror, featuring excessive bloodletting, stylish camerawork and often jarring musical arrangements. The archetypal giallo plot involves a mysterious, black-gloved psychopathic killer who stalks and butchers a series of beautiful women. While most gialli involve a human killer, some also feature a supernatural element.

The typical giallo protagonist is an outsider of some type, often a traveller, tourist, outcast, or even an alienated or disgraced private investigator, and frequently a young woman, often a young woman who is lonely or alone in a strange or foreign situation or environment (gialli rarely or less frequently feature law enforcement officers as chief protagonists).

The protagonists are generally or often unconnected to the murders before they begin and are drawn to help find the killer through their role as witnesses to one of the murders. The mystery is the identity of the killer, who is often revealed in the climax to be another key character, who conceals his or her identity with a disguise (usually some combination of hat, mask, sunglasses, gloves, and trench coat). Thus, the literary whodunit element of the giallo novels is retained, while being filtered through horror genre elements and Italy's long-standing tradition of opera and staged grand guignol drama. The structure of giallo films is also sometimes reminiscent of the so-called "weird menace" pulp magazine horror mystery genre alongside Edgar Allan Poe and Agatha Christie.

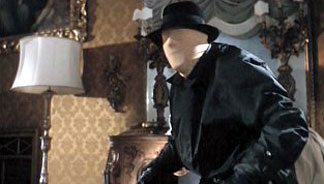
A scene from Blood and Black Lace by Mario Bava (1964)

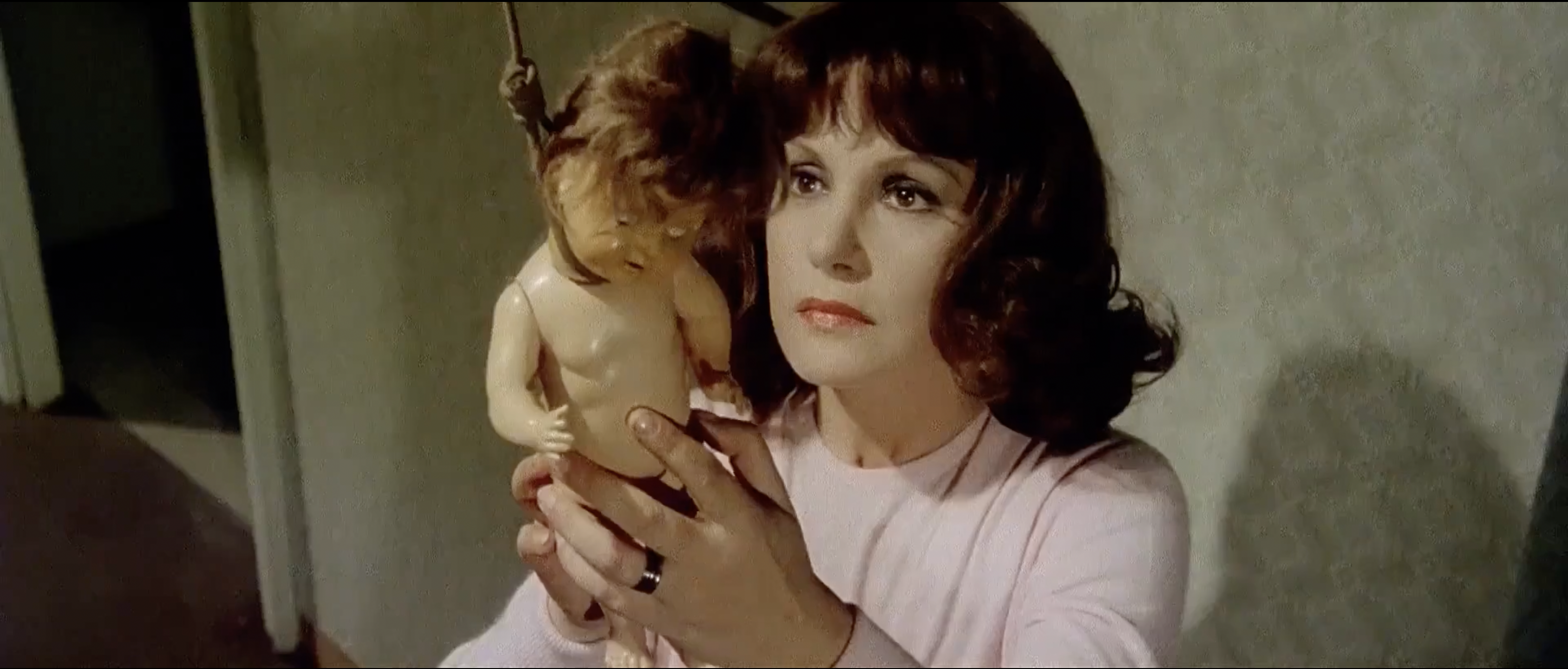
Giuliana Calandra in a famous scene from Deep Red by Dario Argento (1975)

=== A hundred Italian films to be saved ===
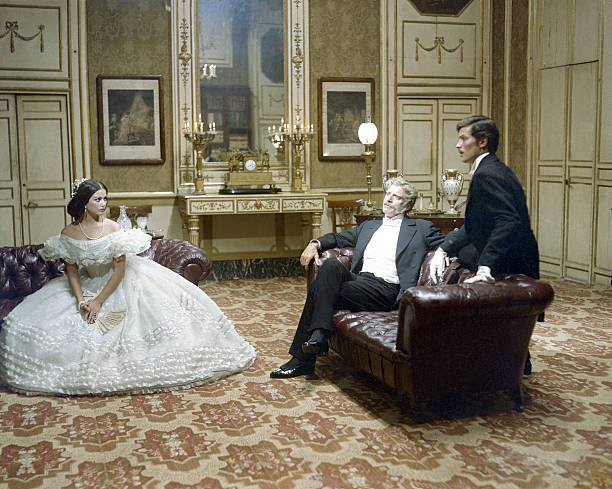
The Leopard (1963) by Luchino Visconti

The list of the A hundred Italian films to be saved (Italian: Cento film italiani da salvare) was created with the aim to report "100 films that have changed the collective memory of the country between 1942 and 1978". Film preservation, or film restoration, describes a series of ongoing efforts among film historians, archivists, museums, cinematheques, and nonprofit organization to rescue decaying film stock and preserve the images they contain. In the widest sense, preservation assures that a movie will continue to exist in as close to its original form as possible.

The project was established in 2008 by the Venice Days festival section of the 65th Venice International Film Festival, in collaboration with Cinecittà Holding and with the support of the Italian Ministry of Cultural Heritage. The list was edited by Fabio Ferzetti, film critic of the newspaper Il Messaggero, in collaboration with film director Gianni Amelio and the writers and film critics Gian Piero Brunetta, Giovanni De Luna, Gianluca Farinelli, Giovanna Grignaffini, Paolo Mereghetti, Morando Morandini, Domenico Starnone and Sergio Toffetti. At the end of the list are added the documentaries by Vittorio De Seta shot between 1954 and 1959.

=== Museums ===
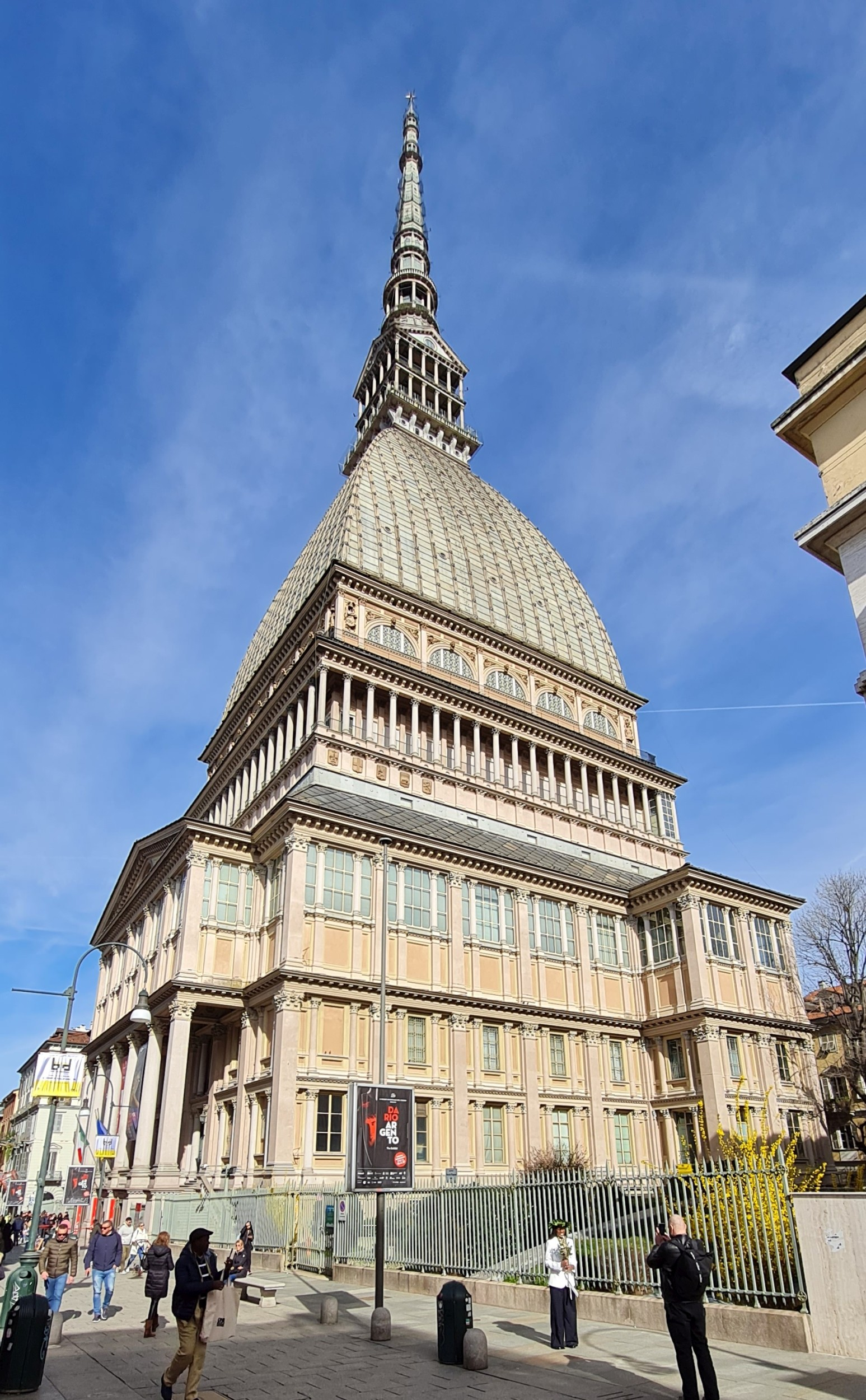
The Mole Antonelliana in Turin, which houses the National Museum of Cinema

The National Museum of Cinema (Italian: Museo Nazionale del Cinema) located in Turin is a motion picture museum inside the Mole Antonelliana tower. It is operated by the Maria Adriana Prolo Foundation, and the core of its collection is the result of the work of the historian and collector Maria Adriana Prolo. It was housed in the Palazzo Chiablese. In 2008, with 532,196 visitors, it ranked 13th among the most visited Italian museums. The museum houses pre-cinematographic optical devices such as magic lanterns, earlier and current film technologies, stage items from early Italian movies and other memorabilia. Along the exhibition path of about 35,000 square feet (3,200 m^{2}) on five levels, it is possible to visit some areas devoted to the different kinds of film crew, and in the main hall, fitted in the temple hall of the Mole (which was a building originally intended as a synagogue), a series of chapels representing several film genres.

The Museum of Precinema (Italian: Museo del Precinema) is a museum in the Palazzo Angeli, Prato della Valle, Padua, related to the history of precinema, or precursors of film. It was created in 1998 to display the Minici Zotti Collection, in collaboration with the Comune of Padua. It also produces interactive touring exhibitions and makes valuable loans to other prestigious exhibitions such as Lanterne magique et film peint at the Cinémathèque Française in Paris and the National Museum of Cinema in Turin.

The Cinema Museum of Rome is located in Cinecittà. The collections consist of movie posters and playbills, cine cameras, projectors, magic lanterns, stage costumes and the patent of Filoteo Alberini's "kinetograph". The Milan Cinema Museum, managed by the Cineteca Italiana, is divided into three sections, the precinema, animation cinema and "Milan as a film set", as well as multimedia and interactive stations.

The Catania Cinema Museum exhibits documents concerning cinema, its techniques and its history, with particular attention to the link between cinema and Sicily. The Cinema Museum of Syracuse collects more than 10,000 exhibits on display in 12 rooms.

== German cinema ==
=== Early cinema and silent film era (1895–1930) ===
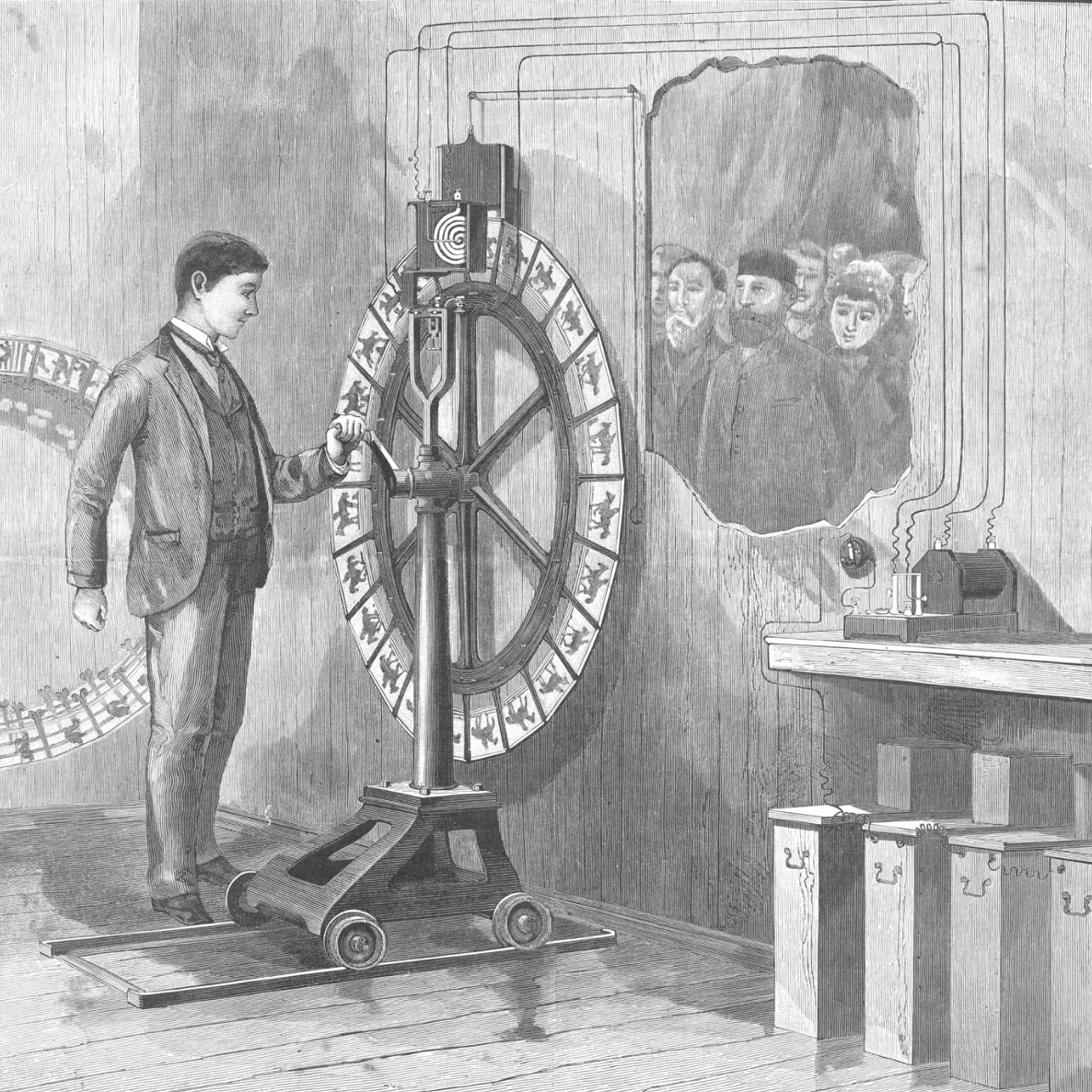
An Anschütz electrotachyscope American Scientific, 16/11/1889, p. 303

German cinema, much like its global counterparts, emerged toward the end of the 19th century with technological innovations and the desire to capture moving images. However, Germany’s contributions to the medium were not limited to just the early screening of films. The technological foundations of cinema were also laid by German inventors and pioneers.

One of the key figures in the early history of film was Ottomar Anschütz (1866–1907), a German photographer and inventor who, alongside the Lumière brothers and Thomas Edison, played a role in the development of the motion picture camera and projector. Anschütz is particularly notable for his contributions to the technology that allowed moving images to be captured and projected. In 1894, he demonstrated his electro-kinetoscope, which was an early film projection device, and he was one of the first to experiment with the concept of time-lapse photography, which would later influence the development of motion pictures.

In 1895, Max Skladanowsky and Emil Skladanowsky, other key German inventors, showcased their Bioscop, a motion-picture projector, in Berlin. This event is considered by many as the official beginning of cinema in Germany, with the Bioscop being a significant advancement in the global projection of moving pictures. While Edison and the Lumières had made their mark internationally, the Skladanowskys' innovations were a milestone for German cinema.

=== German expressionism ===
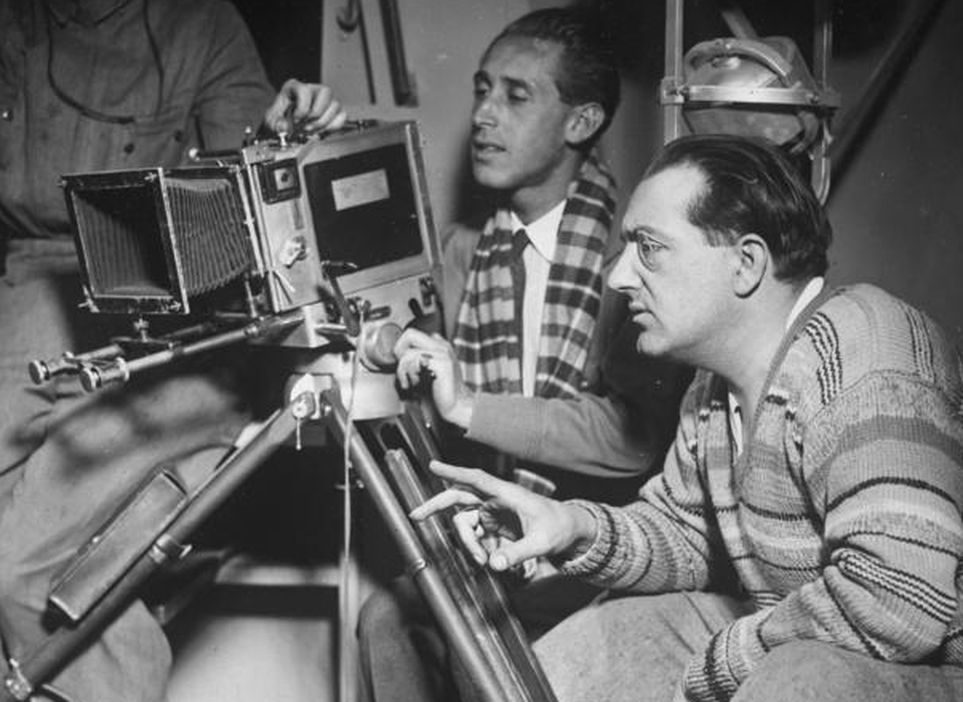
Director Fritz Lang has been cited as one of the most influential filmmakers of all time.

Metropolis (1927), directed by Fritz Lang, first film to be inscribed on UNESCO's Memory of the World Register

German expressionism surfaced as a German art movement in the early 20th century. The focus of this movement was at the inner ideas and feelings of the artists over the replication of facts. Some of the characteristic features of German expressionism were bright colours and simplified shapes, brushstrokes and gestural marks.

German Expressionism had a lasting impact not just on German cinema but on global filmmaking. The innovative techniques developed during this period—particularly the manipulation of lighting, shadows, and set design—were adopted by filmmakers around the world. The movement's focus on subjective experience and psychological depth would continue to shape genres such as film noir, horror, and science fiction for decades to come.

The visual style of German Expressionism, with its emphasis on distorted, angular shapes, exaggerated shadows, and surreal sets, had a profound influence on Hollywood films, particularly in the 1930s and 1940s. The moody lighting and stark contrasts of early Hollywood thrillers, such as The Cat and the Canary (1927) and The Invisible Man (1933), owe a great debt to the cinematic innovations pioneered in Germany. Likewise, the film noir genre, which emerged in the 1940s, drew heavily from the visual language of German Expressionism, incorporating its chiaroscuro lighting, distorted angles, and themes of paranoia and alienation.

Perhaps most notably, Nosferatu and The Cabinet of Dr. Caligari directly influenced the development of the horror genre. Their innovative use of visual motifs, such as eerie, shadowy figures and disorienting set designs, created a template for the psychological horror films that would emerge in the decades that followed. Directors like Alfred Hitchcock and John Frankenheimer would draw on these visual elements to convey fear, suspense, and psychological unease.

The impact of German Expressionism extended far beyond its own borders, influencing movements such as the French avant-garde, Soviet cinema, and later American experimental filmmakers. Films such as Jean Cocteau's Beauty and the Beast (1946) and Orson Welles’ The Trial (1962) would echo the surreal, fragmented style of Expressionist cinema, demonstrating the enduring legacy of the movement.

Nosferatu (1922) directed by F.W. Murnau. Critic and historian Kim Newman declared it as a film that set the template for the genre of horror film.

Prominent German expressionism directors:

- Robert Wiene
- Fritz Lang
- F. W. Murnau
- Arthur Robison
- Paul Leni

Famous German expressionism films:

- The Cabinet of Dr. Caligari (1920) directed by Robert Wienne
- Nosferatu (1922) directed by F. W. Murnau
- Dr. Mabuse the Gambler (1922) directed by Fritz Lang
- Waxworks (1924) directed by Paul Leni
- Metropolis (1927) directed by Fritz Lang
- M (1931) directed by Fritz Lang

=== Nazi Cinema ===
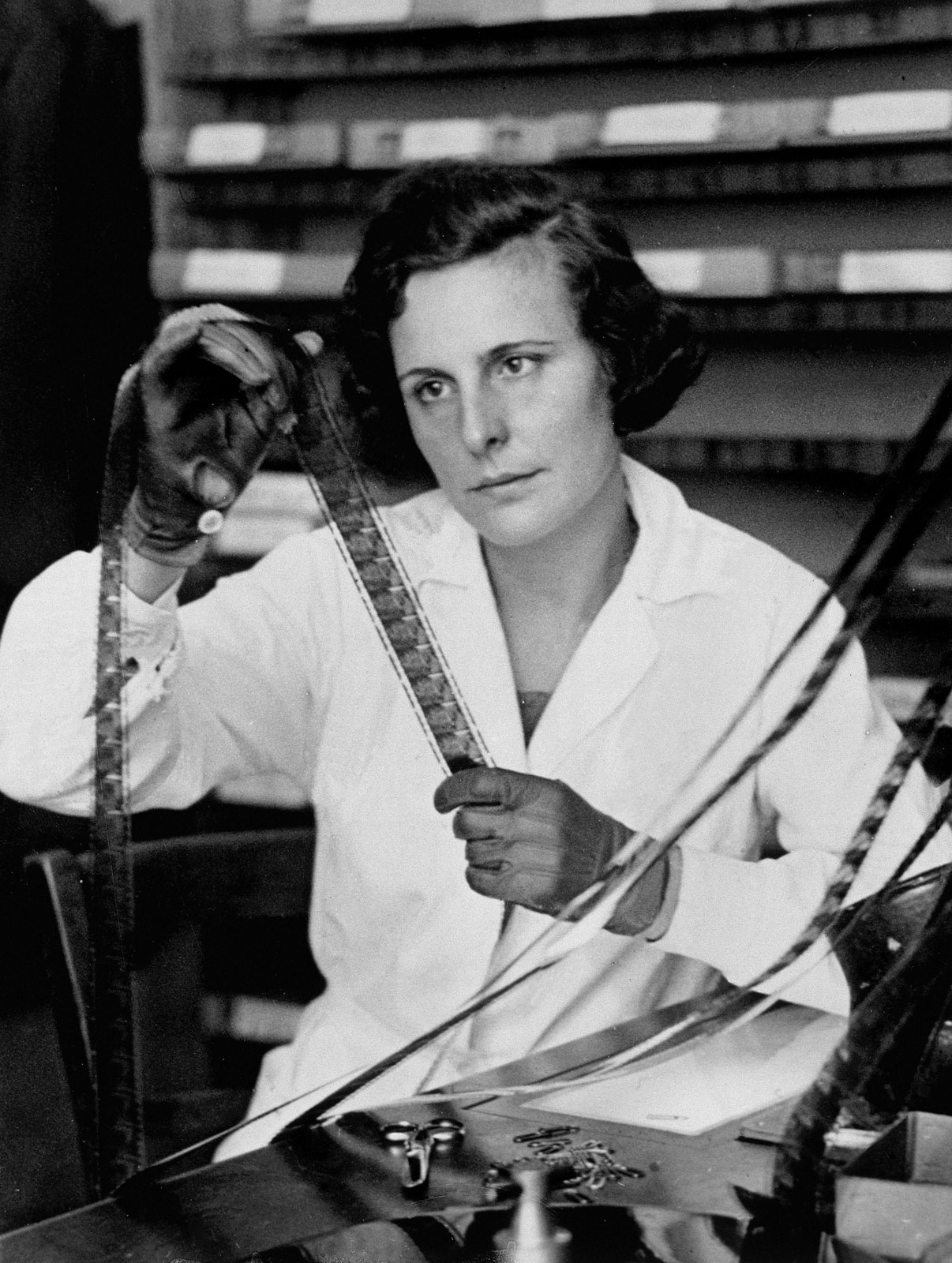
Leni Riefenstahl was a major director in Nazi Germany. Her film Olympia from 1938 about the 1936 Summer Olympics had a major impact on modern sports coverage.

When Adolf Hitler came to power in 1933, the film industry became an important tool for propaganda. Under Joseph Goebbels, the regime sought to use cinema to glorify the state, promote Nazi ideologies, and control public sentiment. While many filmmakers were either co-opted or persecuted, some notable films from this period include Triumph of the Will (1935), Leni Riefenstahl's famous propaganda documentary, and The Eternal Jew (1940). Cinema during this time was highly censored, and many filmmakers fled the country.

When Adolf Hitler assumed power in 1933, he quickly recognized the power of cinema as a tool for shaping public opinion and reinforcing Nazi ideologies. Under the guidance of Joseph Goebbels, the Minister of Propaganda, the German film industry became tightly controlled by the state. Cinema was used to glorify the Nazi regime, promote anti-Semitic and militaristic ideologies, and rally the German populace around the concept of a superior Aryan race. The film industry was utilized to disseminate messages of nationalist pride, the need for conquest, and the demonization of enemies such as Jews, Communists, and other perceived threats.

One of the most famous and controversial films of this period was Leni Riefenstahl's "Triumph of the Will" (1935). A cinematic masterpiece in terms of its technical achievements, it showcased the 1934 Nazi Party Congress in Nuremberg and is often cited as one of the most potent pieces of propaganda ever created. Riefenstahl's stunning cinematography and groundbreaking use of camera angles, lighting, and editing made the event seem grand and inevitable, framing Hitler as a charismatic leader surrounded by a devoted, heroic populace. Another infamous film of the era was "The Eternal Jew" (1940), directed by Fritz Hippler. This anti-Semitic film attempted to portray Jews as a dangerous, subhuman race, reinforcing Nazi stereotypes and justifying the regime's policies of persecution.

=== Post-WWII (1945–1949) and divided Germany ===
After World War II, Germany was divided into East and West, leading to the emergence of two distinct cinema traditions. In the West, American influence led to a more commercially driven film industry, while East Germany (GDR) under Soviet influence developed a state-controlled cinematic system.

West Germany: The film industry began to rebuild, with many filmmakers initially focusing on the emotional and psychological consequences of the war. One notable trend was the "Trümmerfilm" (rubble film), which dealt with the devastation and moral reckoning of postwar Germany. Films like Germany Year Zero (1948) by Roberto Rossellini reflected the stark realities of a war-torn country.

East Germany: The GDR established the DEFA (Deutsche Film-Aktiengesellschaft) studio, producing films that adhered to socialist realism. Notable films include The Murderers Are Among Us (1946), which dealt with the moral reckoning of Nazi-era crimes.ce limited film viewing. The collective effect of these limitations and censorship caused a decrease in war cinematography.

=== 1945–1989 East Germany ===
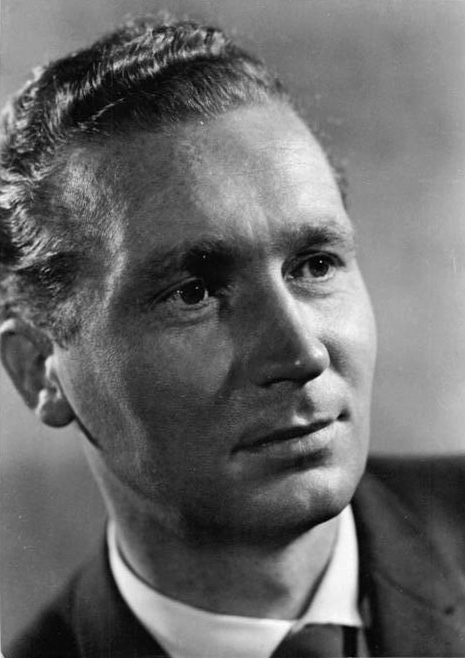
Frank Beyer, director of Jacob the Liar (1975), the only East German film ever nominated for an Academy Award

ast German cinema was shaped by the political and ideological climate of the German Democratic Republic (GDR), which existed from 1949 to 1990. The GDR, under Soviet influence, established a state-controlled film industry that reflected socialist ideals and the policies of the Communist Party. The primary institution for film production in East Germany was DEFA (Deutsche Film-Aktiengesellschaft), which became the official state-owned studio. DEFA's output was heavily influenced by socialist realism, the artistic doctrine that promoted themes of class struggle, collective unity, and the triumph of socialism over capitalism.

East German cinema was not just a medium of entertainment but a powerful tool for political propaganda. At the same time, it also featured filmmakers who sought to explore personal and social issues within the constraints of the state’s ideological framework. Over the decades, East German cinema evolved, adapting to changing political circumstances and growing tensions between the state’s strict control and the filmmakers' desire for creative expression.

=== 1950s–1960s: West German cinema's recovery ===
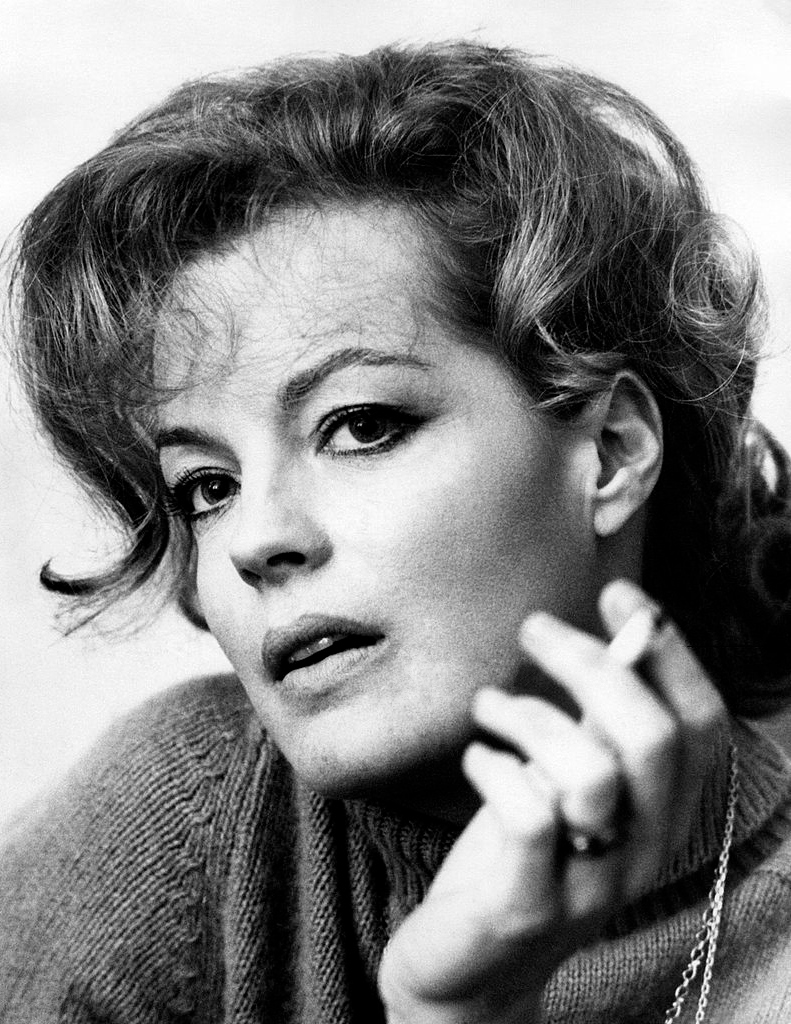
Romy Schneider, an early star of the Heimatfilm

In the 1950s, West German cinema experienced a commercial boom with popular genres such as Heimatfilms (films about rural life) and historical epics. Directors like Helmut Käutner and Wolfgang Staudte attempted to deal with the trauma of the Nazi past, but films often focused more on escapism and rebuilding national identity.

By the 1960s, the French New Wave and Italian Neorealism influenced a new generation of German filmmakers. Films became more socially conscious, reflecting the cultural and political changes of the time. One of the most significant movements during this period was the New German Cinema. There was a single cause of official propaganda during the initial half of the war as per the German government. The meaning and significance of war had become quite questionable by the year 1916 with the commencement of a re-evaluation of movies. Directors and producers started to consider designs suitable for the period after the end of the war.

This era marked the rise of a more critical, avant-garde cinema that dealt with themes such as history, identity, and the trauma of the Nazi period. Key filmmakers included Werner Herzog, Rainer Werner Fassbinder, Volker Schlöndorff, Wim Wenders, and Margarethe von Trotta. Films like The Marriage of Maria Braun (1979) and The Tin Drum (1979), which won the Palme d'Or at Cannes, reflected the complexity of post-war German identity and history.

The New German Cinema was characterized by its intellectual rigor, experimental storytelling, and a willingness to confront difficult subjects, including Germany's Nazi past, the aftermath of war, and the country’s fractured identity.

The founders wanted to feature civilian, non-warlike and inoffensive material in the films to play a part in the victory by drawing people's attention away from the war. the First World War played an important role in the growth as well as technical changes in the laws and operation of cinema in Germany. German producers have made many artistic and technical contributions to early film technology.

=== Contemporary German cinema (1980s–present) ===
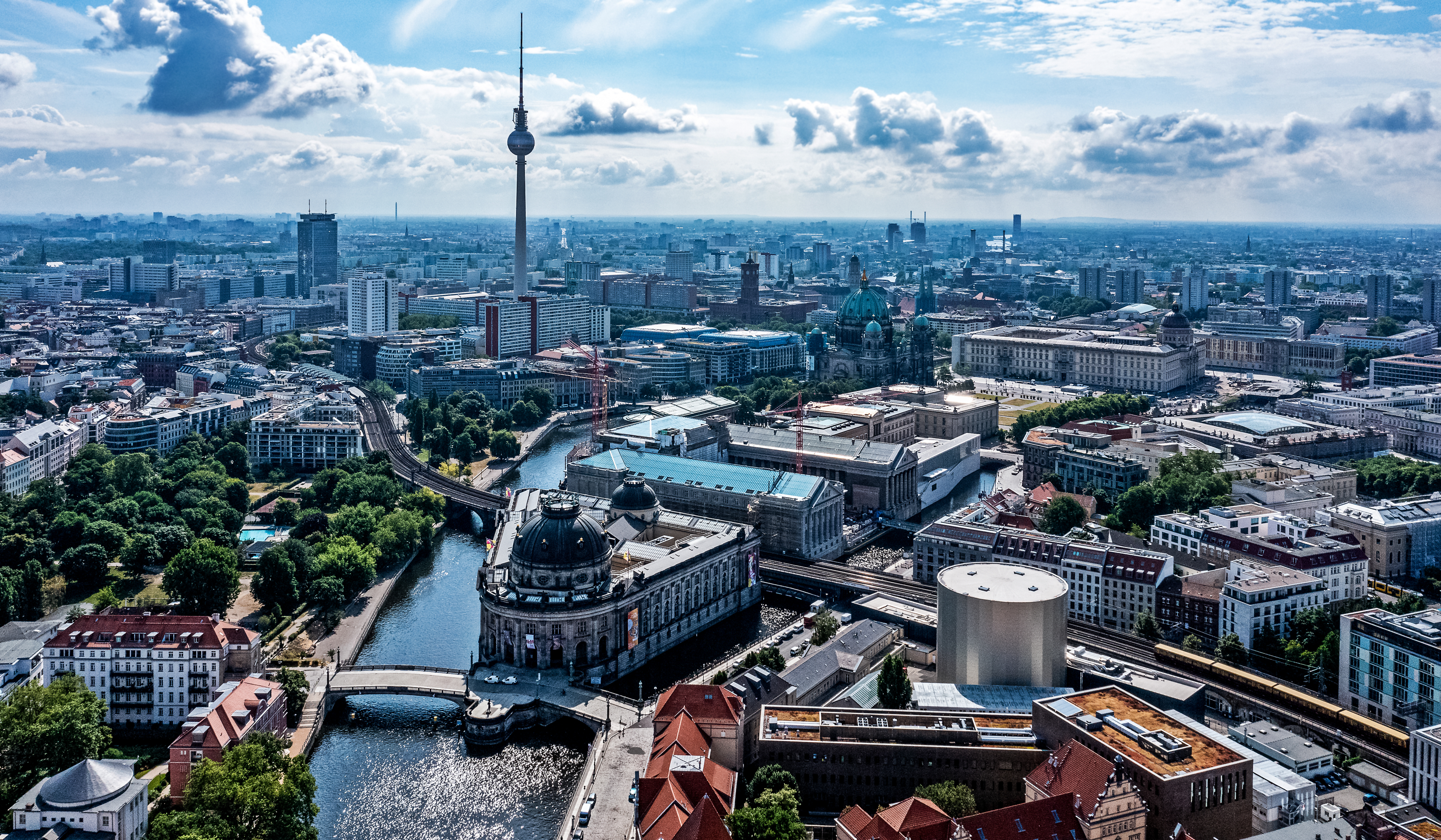
Berlin returned to being the capital of the German film industry since the German reunification in 1990.

Since the 1980s, German cinema has undergone a remarkable transformation, adapting to both the globalization of the film industry and the dramatic shifts in Germany's political, social, and cultural landscape. The fall of the Berlin Wall in 1989 and the subsequent reunification of Germany in 1990 marked a profound moment in the country’s history, and this political upheaval had a direct impact on German cinema. Filmmakers from both East and West Germany began to engage with the legacies of division and reunification, exploring how the historical and political fragmentation of the country affected individual and collective identities. In addition to these themes, German cinema also increasingly explored global issues such as migration, identity, multiculturalism, and Germany’s role in the modern world.

The 1990s were marked by a wave of new filmmakers who began to address issues such as migration, identity, cultural integration, and the impact of German reunification. This decade saw a shift toward more accessible forms of cinema, with a blend of commercial success and artistic ambition.

The 2000s marked a period of renewed international attention on German cinema, with films from this era becoming prominent on the festival circuit and even breaking into the mainstream. German cinema in this period continued to explore themes of identity, migration, and the complexities of modern Germany, but it also embraced genre experimentation and global influences.

In the 2010s, German cinema further cemented its status on the international stage, with filmmakers increasingly grappling with Germany’s role in a globalized world. There was a growing recognition of the importance of multiculturalism, immigration, and diversity as central themes in contemporary German culture and cinema.

== Soviet cinema ==
Soviet Union cinema consisted of movies created by the constituent republics of the Soviet Union. Predominantly produced in the Russian language, the films reflect pre-Soviet elements including the history, language, and culture of the Union. It is different from the Russian cinema, even though the central government in Moscow regulated the movies.

Among their republican films, Georgia, Armenia, Ukraine, and Azerbaijan were the most productive. Moldavia, Belarus, and Lithuania have also been prominent but to a lesser extent. The film industry was completely nationalized for a major part of the history of the country. It was governed by the laws and philosophies advocated by the Soviet Communist Party that brought a revolutionized perspective of the cinema in the form of "social realism" that contrasted with the view that was in place before the Soviet Union or even after it.

The Russians had an instinct for film-making from the very start. The first film dramatized by the Russians was made in the year 1908, which gives the Russian cinematography the status of one of the oldest industries in the world. There were more than 1300 cinemas in Russia till the year 1913 and the country had produced over 100 movies which had a profound influence on the film making of the American and European origin.

=== Censorship ===
Films in the Soviet Union started to be censored especially ever since November 1917 when the People's Commissariat of Education was created. It was almost a month after the Soviet state was itself established. After the Bolsheviks gained strength in the Soviet Union in the year 1917, they had a major deficit of political legitimacy. Political foundations were uneasy and the cinema played an important role in the protection of the USSR's existence.

Movies played a central role at that time since they served to convince the masses about the legitimacy of the regime and their status as the bearers of historical facts. Some of the prominent movies of the time include The Great Citizen and Circus. A film committee was set up in March 1919 to establish a school view a view to training the technicians and actors so that a modest movie production schedule would be commenced. The committee was headed by a long-term Bolshevik party's member D.I. Leshchenko, In addition to looking after and ensuring the correctness of genres and themes of the film companies, Leshchenko also worked to deter the flaring up of anti-Soviet movie propaganda. It was particularly important because of the war communism in that era.

The documentaries and features of Soviet cinema thrived at their best in the 1920s. Filmmakers enthusiastically engaged themselves in the development of the first socialist state of the world. Rather than having to create money for the Hollywood film industry, the filmmakers saw this as an opportunity to focus on the education of people of the new Soviet. The first leader of the country to become the USSR and founder of the 1917 Bolshevik Revolution – Vladimir Ilyich Lenin, visualized the cinema as a technological art that was best suited for a state established on the basis of the conversion of humanity by means of technology and industry. Cinema took the position of the most valuable form means of art production and propagation across masses. The decade is known for experimentation with different styles of movie-making.

=== The 1920s ===
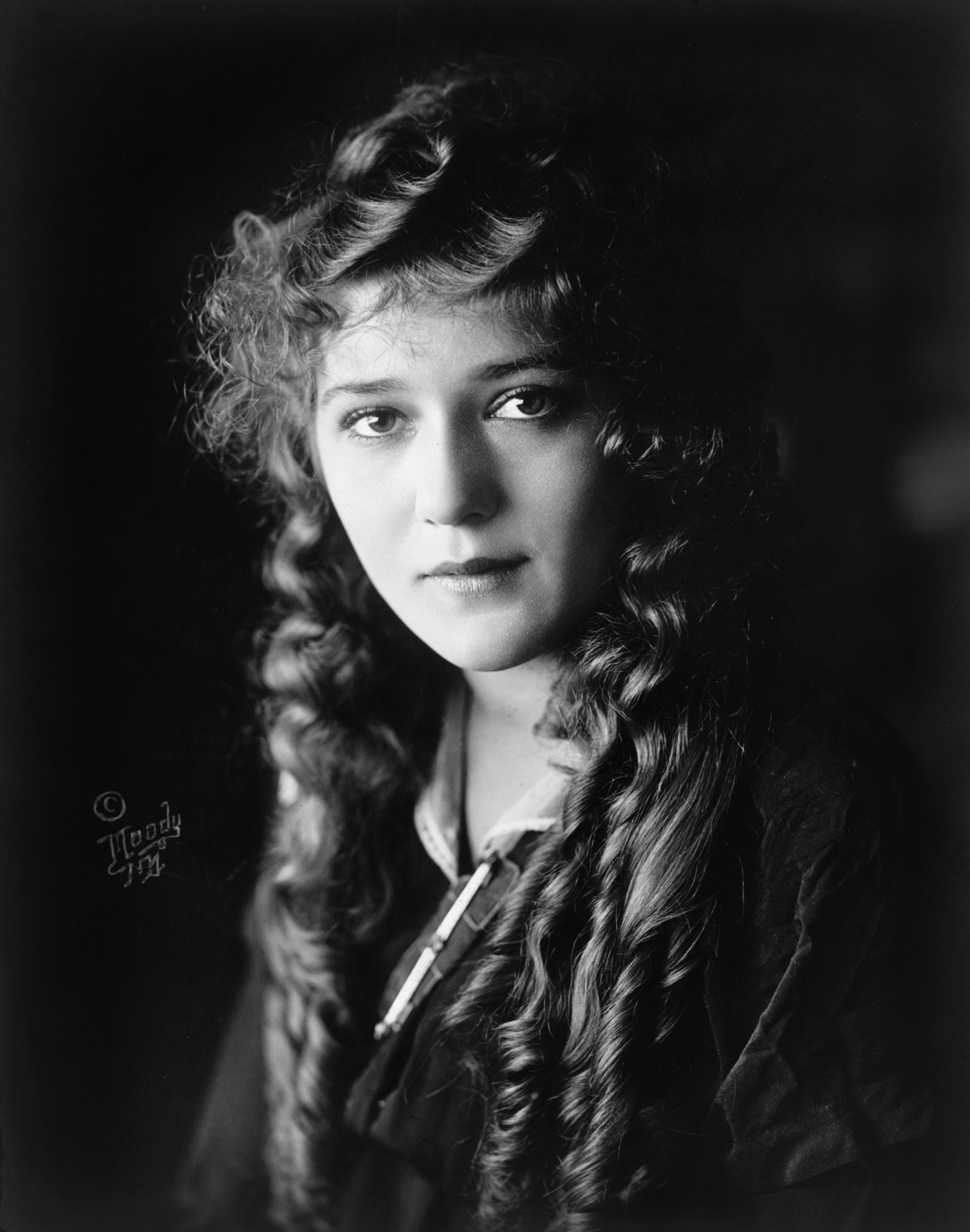
Mary Pickford

During the 1920s, the USSR was getting a New Economic Policy. It was a decade when certain industries had a relaxed state control that provided people with a sense of mini-capitalism inside the Communist economy. That was a time of prosperity of the private movie theaters, and together with it, the whole Soviet movie industry thrived. American movies had a major influence on the Russians, unlike Soviet productions. Many Hollywood stars like Mary Pickford and Douglas Fairbanks were idolized as heroes.

The heroic Fairbanks became a sex symbol and the contemporary star system got popularity with Pickford. The Soviet reaction to the Hollywood influence was a mix of repulsion and admiration. Near the end of 1924, Sovkino and ARK were established which were two organizations that influenced the cinema of the Soviet Union the most in the decade. That was a time when the ambitious, zealous, and young film community members had bright plans for the film industry. Their efforts were directed at making the processes of production and distribution more effective and organized and raising the status of workers in the industry. In other words, they tried to publicize the cinema.

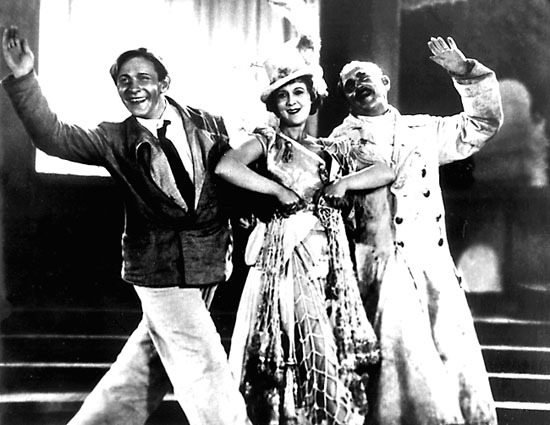
Jolly Fellows (1934) directed by Sergei Eisenstein

=== Prominent Soviet cinema directors ===
- Mikheil Chiaureli
- Grigori Aleksandrov
- Sergei Fedorovich Bondarchuk
- Alexander Dovzhenko
- Sergei Eisenstein
- Dziga Vertov
- Tarkovsky

=== Famous Soviet cinema films ===
- Battleship Potemkin (1925) directed by Sergei Eisenstein
- Jolly Fellows (1934) directed by Grigori Aleksandrov
- Man with a Movie Camera (1929) directed by Dziga Vertov
- Earth (1930) directed by Alexander Dovzhenko

== Film festivals ==
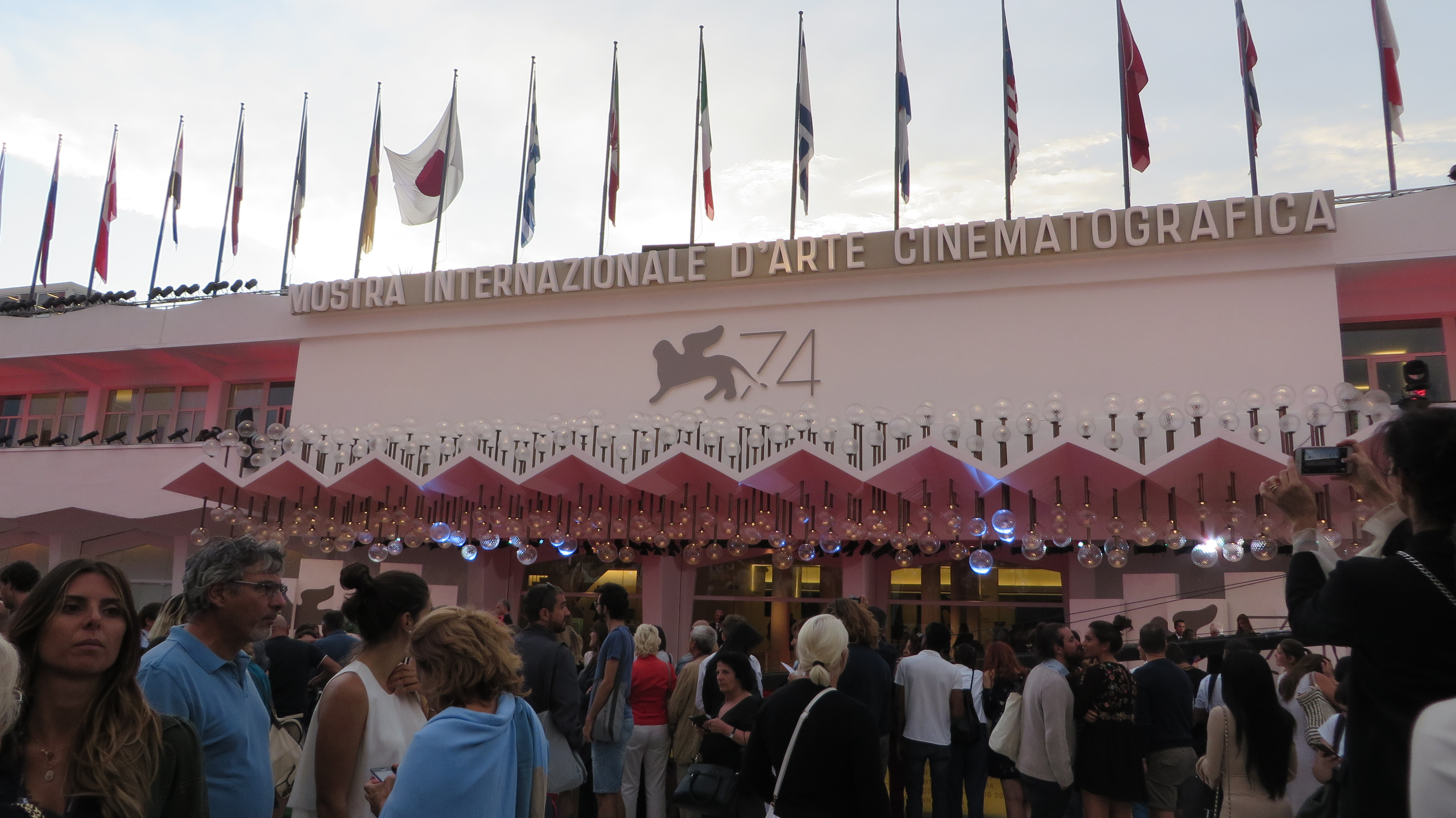
The Venice Film Festival, Italy, is the oldest film festival in the world.

The "Big Three" film festivals are:

- Berlin
- Cannes
- Venice

In particular, the Venice Film Festival, held annually since 1932 and awarding the Golden Lion, is the oldest film festival in the world.

Others

- Belgrade
- Brussels
- Dublin
- Edinburgh
- Fantasporto
- Haugesund
- Istanbul
- Karlovy Vary
- Kraków
- Kyiv
- Locarno
- London
- Moscow
- Oberhausen
- Rome
- Rotterdam
- San Sebastian
- Sarajevo
- Sitges
- Stockholm
- Tallinn
- Tampere
- Thessaloniki
- Transilvania
- Turin
- Warsaw
- Wrocław

== Film awards ==
- European Film Awards
- BAFTA
- Goya
- César
- Lolas
- David di Donatello
- Orły
- IFTA

== Directors ==
French

- Céline Sciamma
- Jean Renoir
- Lumière brothers
- François Truffaut
- Jean-Luc Godard
- Louis Malle
- Jacques Audiard
- Jacques Tati
- Eric Rohmer
- Georges Méliès
- Marcel Carné
- Jean-Pierre Jeunet
- Jean Vigo
- Claude Chabrol
- Robert Bresson
- Jacques Rivette
- Roger Vadim
- Jacques Demy
- Alain Resnais
- Luc Besson
- Agnès Varda
- Bertrand Tavernier

Belgian

- Chantal Akerman
- Dardenne brothers
- Lukas Dhont
- Yolande Moreau

British

- Gareth Edwards
- Alfred Hitchcock
- Charlie Chaplin
- Ridley Scott
- Christopher Nolan
- Richard Attenborough
- Alan Parker
- Tony Scott
- Adrian Lyne
- Paul Greengrass
- David Lean
- John Schlesinger
- Michael Powell
- Peter Greenaway
- Sam Mendes
- Carol Reed
- Ken Loach
- Kenneth Branagh

Italian

- Federico Fellini
- Taviani brothers
- Ettore Scola
- Pier Pasolini
- Sergio Leone
- Bernardo Bertolucci
- Vittorio DeSica
- Roberto Rossellini
- Franco Zeffirelli
- Luchino Visconti
- Gillo Pontecorvo
- Dino Laurentiis
- Giuseppe Tornatore
- Tonino Guerra
- Giuseppe Santis
- Michelangelo Antonioni

German

- Rainer Fassbinder
- Margarethe Trotta
- Werner Herzog
- Wim Wenders
- Volker Schlöndorff
- Fritz Lang
- F. W. Murnau
- Max Ophüls

Russian

- Dziga Vertov
- Sergei Eisenstein
- Sergei Bondarchuk
- Mikhail Kalatozov
- Lev Kuleshov
- Vsevolod Pudovkin
- Andrei Tarkovsky
- Alexander Sokurov
- Andrey Zvyagintsev

Danish

- Carl Dreyer
- Bille August
- Lars Von Trier
- Susanne Bier
- Nicolas Winding Refn
- Lone Scherfig
- Erik Balling
- Thomas Vinterberg

Swedish

- Bo Widerberg
- Ingmar Bergman
- Victor Sjöström
- Lasse Hallström
- Sven Nykvist
- Jan Troell
- Mai Zetterling

Polish

- Roman Polanski
- Andrzej Wajda
- Krzysztof Kieslowski
- Agnieszka Holland
- Andrzej Żuławski
- Krzysztof Zanussi
- Paweł Pawlikowski

Dutch

- Paul Verhoeven
- Jan de Bont
- Anton Corbijn
- Theo van Gogh (film director)
- Joris Ivens
- Fons Rademakers
- Alex van Warmerdam
- Dick Maas

Turkish

- Fatih Akın
- Nuri Bilge Ceylan
- Zeki Demirkubuz
- Ertem Eğilmez
- Metin Erksan
- Yılmaz Güney

Austrian

- Michael Haneke
- Georg Pabst

Other

- Pedro Almodóvar (Spanish)
- Theo Angelopoulos (Greek)
- Luis Buñuel (Spanish)
- Miloš Forman (Czech)
- Hrafn Gunnlaugsson (Icelandic)
- Dušan Makavejev (Serbian)
- Emir Kusturica (Serbian)
- Giorgos Lanthimos (Greek)
- Jiri Menzel (Czech)
- Manoel Oliveira (Portuguese)
- Otto Preminger (Austria-Hungary)
- István Szabó (Hungarian)
- Danis Tanović (Bosnian)
- Alexander Dovzhenko (Ukrainian)
- Kira Muratova (Ukrainian)
- Sergei Parajanov (Ukrainian, Armenian)

== Cinematographer ==
French

- Bruno Delbonnel
- Darius Khondji
- Pierre Lhomme
- Bruno Nuytten
- Claude Renoir

Belgian

- Benoît Debie
- Jo Willems

British

- Anthony Dod Mantle
- John Mathieson
- Douglas Slocombe
- Oliver Wood (cinematographer)
- Roger Deakins

Italian

- Mario Bava
- Mauro Fiore
- Giuseppe Rotunno
- Pasqualino De Santis
- Dante Spinotti
- Vittorio Storaro

German

- Michael Ballhaus
- Walter Frentz
- Jost Vacano

Dutch

- Hoyte van Hoytema
- Jan de Bont
- Rogier Stoffers
- Theo van de Sande
- Robby Müller
- John Coquillon

== Actors ==
- Charlie Chaplin
- Greta Garbo
- Ingrid Bergman
- Jeanne Moreau
- Brigitte Bardot
- Jean Gabin
- Erland Josephson
- Yul Brynner
- Max von Sydow
- Liv Ullmann
- Mads Mikkelsen
- Tatiana Samoilova
- Stellan Skarsgård
- Pernilla August
- Lena Olin
- Peter Stormare
- Alexander Kaidanovsky
- Antonio Banderas
- Anna Q. Nilsson
- Ghita Nørby
- Bibi Andersson
- Harriet Andersson
- Gérard Depardieu
- Laurence Olivier
- Ingrid Thulin
- Peter O'Toole
- Minnie Driver
- Juliette Binoche
- Marion Cotillard
- Michael Redgrave
- Vanessa Redgrave
- Nastassja Kinski
- Claudia Cardinale
- Sophia Loren
- Marcello Mastroianni
- Giulietta Masina
- Judi Dench
- Catherine Deneuve
- Catherine Zeta-Jones
- Anthony Hopkins
- Daniel Day-Lewis
- Vivien Leigh
- Audrey Hepburn
- Charlotte Gainsbourg
- Gina Lollobrigida
- Bruno Ganz
- Fanny Ardant
- Charlotte Rampling
- Isabelle Huppert
- Aleksey Batalov
- Louis Jouvet
- Isabelle Adjani
- Daniel Auteuil
- Rutger Hauer
- Famke Janssen
- Jeroen Krabbé
- Sylvia Kristel
- Carice van Houten
- Johannes Heesters
- Michiel Huisman
- Carel Struycken
- Emmanuelle Béart
- Vittorio Gassman
- Michael Caine
- Julie Christie
- Michel Piccoli
- Erich von Stroheim
- Alec Guinness
- Melina Mercouri
- Irene Papas
- Rossy de Palma
- Maurice Chevalier
- Silvana Mangano
- Kristin Scott Thomas
- Romy Schneider
- Simone Signoret
- Kate Winslet
- Derek Jacobi
- Dirk Bogarde
- Milena Dravić
- Louis de Funès
- Alain Delon
- Anthony Hopkins
- Sandra Hüller

== Films ==
- 8 1/2 (Italy)
- Andalusian dog (France)
- Underground (Yugoslavia)
- Amsterdamned (The Netherlands)
- Andrei Rublev (USSR)
- Atalanta (France)
- Ballad of a Soldier (USSR)
- Battleship Potemkin (USSR)
- Black Book (film) (The Netherlands)
- Elle (film) (France)
- Vampire from Ferata (Czechoslovakia)
- No Man's Land (Bosnia and Herzegovina)
- The Vanishing (1988 film) (The Netherlands)
- Viridiana (Spain)
- The Return (Russia)
- The Age of Christ (Kristove roky) (Czechoslovakia)
- All About My Mother (Spain)
- Last Year at Marienbad (France)
- The Blue Angel (Germany)
- With the Match Factory Girl (Finland)
- Daily Beauty (France)
- Road (Italy)
- Europe (Denmark)
- The Tin Drum (Federal Republic of Germany)
- Jules and Jim (France)
- Tomorrow I'll Wake Up and Scald Myself with Tea (Czechoslovakia)
- The Marriage of Maria Braun (Federal Republic of Germany)
- Wild Strawberries (Sweden)
- Mirror (USSR)
- The Cabinet of Dr. Caligari (Germany)
- Comedians (Greece)
- Lady Hamilton (United Kingdom)
- Letyat Zhuravli (USSR)
- Metropolis (Germany)
- Character (film) (The Netherlands)
- A Man and a Woman (France)
- The Last Breath (France)
- The Sky Over Berlin (Federal Republic of Germany)
- Die Nibelungen (Germany)
- Ordinary Fascism (USSR)
- Orpheus (France)
- Pelle the Conqueror (Denmark)
- Ash and Diamond (Poland)
- Person (Sweden)
- Trains Under Scrutiny (Czechoslovakia)
- Last Tango in Paris (Italy)
- Soldier of Orange (The Netherlands)
- Antonia's Line (The Netherlands)
- Bicycle Thieves (Italy)
- The Rules of the Game (France)
- Adventure (Italy)
- Road to Life (USSR)
- Rocco and His Brothers (Italy)
- Sexmission (Poland)
- Sweet Life (Italy)
- The Assault (1986 film) (The Netherlands)
- The Word (Denmark)
- The Servant (United Kingdom)
- Death in Venice (Italy)
- The Passion of Joan of Arc (France)
- The Third Man (United Kingdom)
- Three Colors (France)
- Fanfan-Tyulpan (France)
- Blowup (United Kingdom)
- Hiroshima, My Love (France)
- Man of Marble (Poland)
- Man with a Movie Camera (USSR)
- 400 Blows (France)
- The Umbrellas of Cherbourg (France)
- Turkish Delight (1973 film) (The Netherlands)
- Pandora's Box (Germany)
- I Killed Einstein, Lord (Czechoslovakia)
- Underground (Yugoslavia)
- Dry Summer (Turkey)
- Hababam Sınıfı (Turkey)
- Yol (Turkey)
- Head-On (film) (Germany, Turkey)
- Uzak (Turkey)
- Amélie (France)
- A Very Long Engagement (France)
- La Vie en Rose (France)
- Once Upon a Time in Anatolia (Turkey)
- Winter Sleep (Turkey)
- Two Days, One Night (Belgium)
- Portrait of a Lady on Fire (France)
- Close (Belgium)

== See also ==
- List of cinema of the world
- List of European films
- Cinema of the world
- World cinema
- European Film Promotion
- Media Plus
- Film festivals in Europe
