= Lost in the Dark =

Lost in the Dark can refer to:

- Lost in the Dark (play), a 1901 play by Roberto Bracco
- Lost in the Dark (1914 film), a 1914 Italian silent film
- Lost in the Dark (1947 film), a 1947 Italian film
- Lost in the Dark (2007 film), a 2007 TV film
- Lost in the Dark Unchanted Forest, the eleventh book in the Hank the Cowdog series
