= Lost in the Dark (1947 film) =

1947 film directed by Camillo Mastrocinque

- Film poster
- Directed by: Camillo Mastrocinque
- Written by: Giovanni Bracco; Vittorio De Sica; Camillo Mastrocinque; Fulvio Palmieri; Aldo Vergano; Cesare Zavattini
- Produced by: Fortunato Misiano
- Starring: Vittorio De Sica
- Cinematography: Renato Del Frate
- Edited by: Gino Talamo
- Music by: Ezio Carabella
- Production company: Romana Film
- Distributed by: Variety Film
- Release date: September 1947
- Running time: 105 minutes
- Country: Italy
- Language: Italian

Lost in the Dark (Italian: Sperduti nel buio) is a 1947 Italian melodrama film directed by Camillo Mastrocinque. It was entered into the 1947 Cannes Film Festival. The film was based on a 1901 play of the same title by Roberto Bracco which had earlier been made into a 1914 silent film. The film's sets were designed by the futurist architect Virgilio Marchi.

== Cast ==
- Vittorio De Sica as Nunzio
- Fiorella Betti as Paolina
- Jacqueline Plessis as Livia
- Enrico Glori as Paolo Nardone
- Olga Solbelli as Emilia
- Anna Corinto as Lolotta
- Luigi Pavese as Frantz Cardillo
- Giuseppe Porelli as Giovanni
- Pietro Bigerna
- Leo Dale
- Primo Di Gennaro
- Augusto Di Giovanni
- Claudio Ermelli
- Pupella Maggio
- Annielo Mele
- Tina Pica
- Maria Luisa Reda
- Alfredo Rizzo
- Sandro Ruffini
- Agostino Salvietti
- Domenico Serra
- Ettore Zambuto

== Bibliography ==
- Mancini, Elaine. Struggles of the Italian film industry during fascism, 1930-1935. UMI Research Press, 1985.
