= Virginia Balistrieri =

Italian stage and film actress

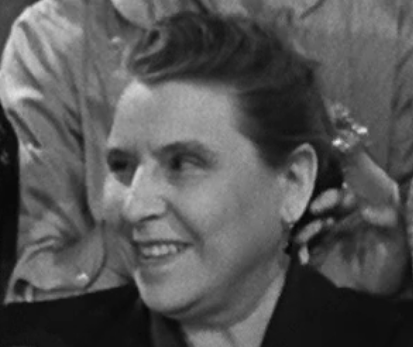
- Balistrieri in the movie Auguri e figli maschi! (1951)
- Born: 15 January 1888; Trapani, Kingdom of Italy
- Died: 7 December 1960 (aged 72); Rome, Italy
- Occupation: Actress
- Years active: 1914–1959 (film)

Virginia Balistrieri also credited as Virginia Balestrieri (15 January 1888 – 7 December 1960) was an Italian stage and film actress. She was married to the actor Giovanni Grasso. In 1914 she starred in the silent film Lost in the Dark, seen as a forerunner of Italian neorealism. In the post-Second World War years she worked as a character actress in productions such as the 1950 religious film Margaret of Cortona.

== Selected filmography ==
- Lost in the Dark (1914)
- No Man's Land (1939)
- Hawk of the Nile (1950)
- The Outlaws (1950)
- Welcome, Reverend! (1950)
- The Cliff of Sin (1950)
- Margaret of Cortona (1950)
- Fatal Desire (1953)
- Mermaid of Naples (1956)

== Bibliography ==
- Ann C. Paietta. Saints, Clergy and Other Religious Figures on Film and Television, 1895-2003. McFarland, 2005.
