= Fiorella Betti =

Italian actress and voice actress

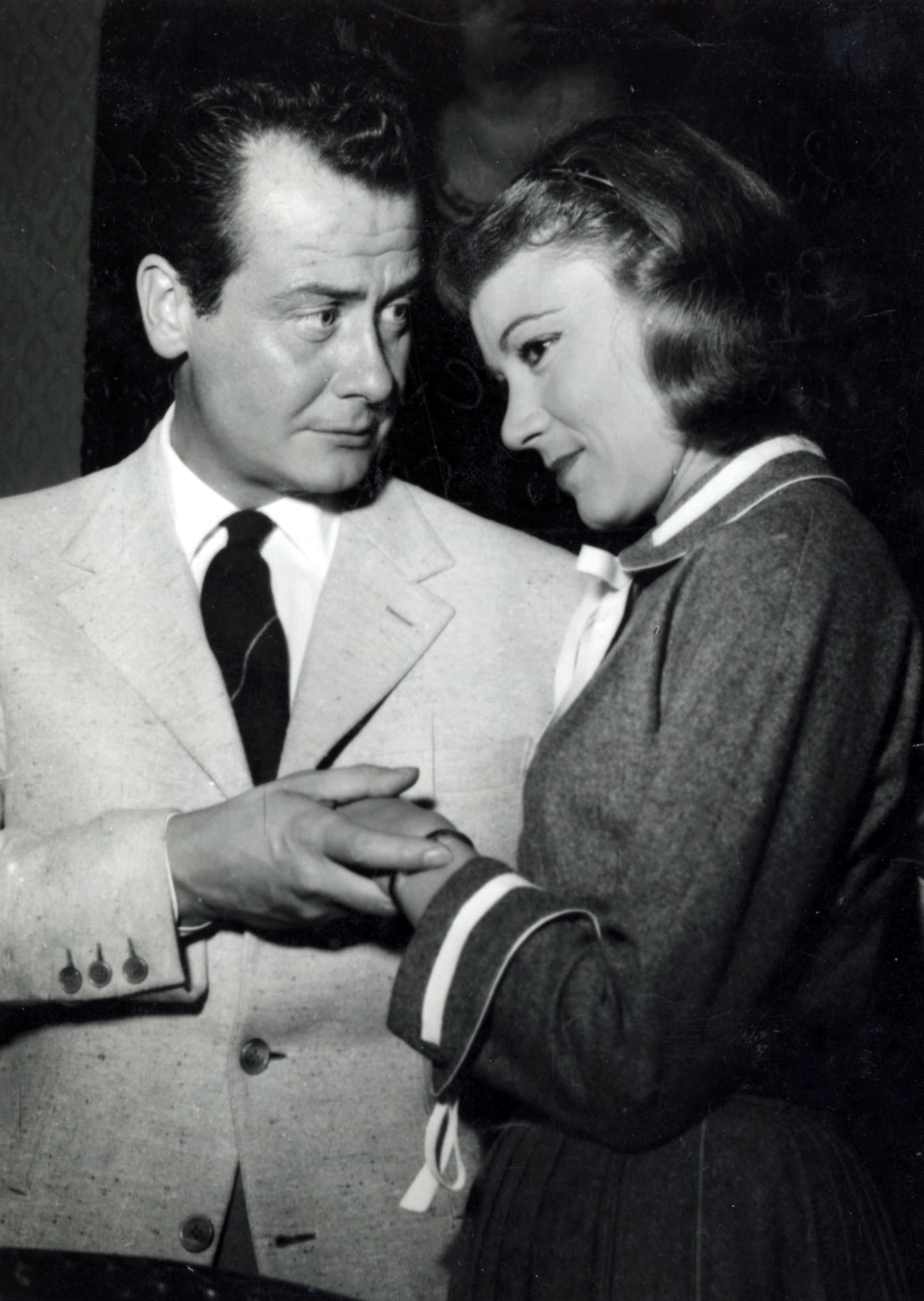
- Betti with actor Roberto Villa (1955)
- Born: 18 April 1927; Roma, Lazio, Italy
- Died: 2 November 2001 (aged 74); Rome, Lazio, Italy
- Occupation: Actress
- Years active: 1949-1978 (film & TV)

Fiorella Betti (1927–2001) was an Italian actress. She was also a voice actress, dubbing a number of actresses in postwar Italian films.

Born Delia Betti in Rome, she debuted at a very young age, and is best known for the lead role in Camillo Mastrocinque's Lost in the Dark. In the 1950s, she focused her career on dubbing, lending her voice to Hollywood stars such as Elizabeth Taylor, Grace Kelly, Natalie Wood and Jean Simmons.

== Biography ==
He graduated from the Centro Sperimentale di Cinematografia in 1942.

She died on November 2, 2001, at the age of 74, and was buried in Rome's Cimitero Flaminio.

== Selected filmography ==
- Captain Fracasse (1940)
- Sleeping Beauty (1942)
- The Champion (1943)
- Lost in the Dark (1947)
- Eleven Men and a Ball (1948)
- Tragic Spell (1951)
- VIP my Brother Superman (1968)
