= La presa di Roma =

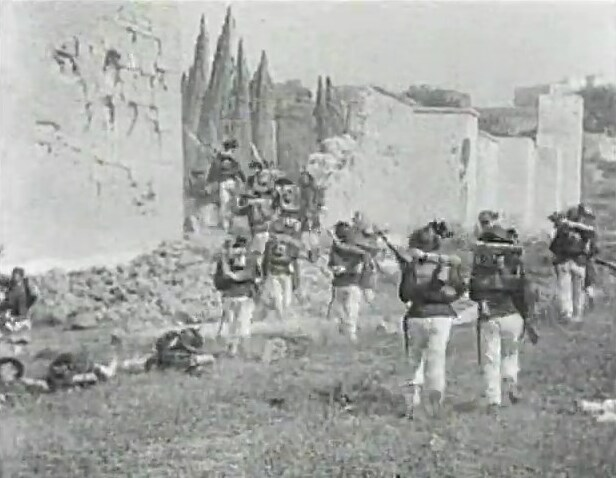
- Directed by: Filoteo Alberini
- Produced by: Alberini & Santoni
- Cinematography: Filoteo Alberini
- Release date: 1905
- Running time: 9 minutes
- Country: Italy
- Language: Silent

A six-minute version

La presa di Roma, also known as La breccia di Porta Pia or Bandiera bianca, and distributed in English-speaking countries under the title The Capture of Roma is a 1905 Italian short black-and-white silent film directed by Filoteo Alberini.

== Plot ==
The film recreates the final events leading to Italian unification in September 1870. After pope Pius IX had refused King Victor Emmanuel II demand to cede to the new Kingdom of Italy the last remnants of the Papal States, the latter sent his army to place Rome under a state of siege. Despite a last effort by Italian general Carchidio, the head of the papal force Hermann Kanzler refused to surrender. On 20 September, after a cannonade of three hours had breached the Aurelian Walls at Porta Pia, the Bersaglieri entered Rome and Pius IX ordered General Kanzler to hoist the white flag on the dome of St. Peter's Basilica. The film ends with an apotheosis showing the heroes of Italian independence.

== Release ==
The first projection took place on 16 Septembre 1905 at the Cinematografo Artistico in Livorno. It was followed by a screening outdoors on a large screen in front of the Porta Pia attended by thousands of people in the context of the celebration of the 35th anniversary of the event.

== Restoration ==
The film was originally composed of 8 shots and 7 intertitles and lasted about 10 minutes. The surviving version, restored in 2005 by the Centro Sperimentale di Cinematografia, Cineteca Nazionale [Experimental Cinematography Center, National Film Library] on the basis of material found in Italy, Argentina, United States and United Kingdom, only includes four shots. The missing shots are replaced by production stills and/or a descriptive text.

== Analysis ==
All shots were filmed with a fixed camera, each one constituting an autonomous scene.

Intertitle: General Carchidio sent to parley at the Milvian Bridge.

1. Studio set representing a city gate and a statue. A general enters from the right on horseback with an escort of two officers. He dismounts and salutes two waiting officers. He is blindfolded and taken into a carriage which enters the gate.

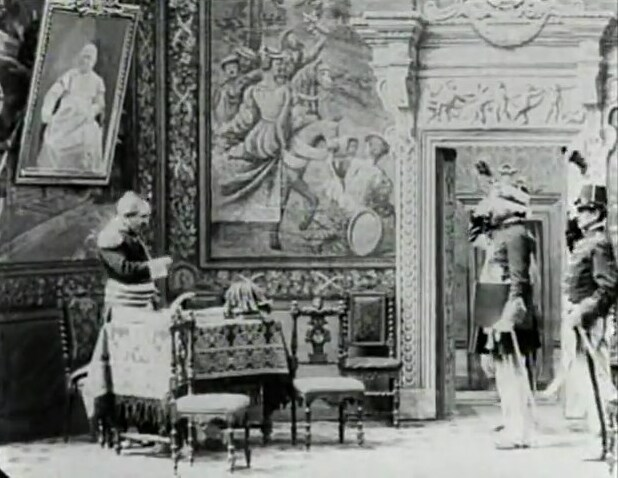
Meeting between Generals Kanzler and Carchidio

Intertitle: From General Kanzler: No surrender!

2. Studio set representing a luxurious office with tapestries and a portrait of Pope Pius IX. General Kanzler sitting at his desk at the Ministry of the Armies stands up when General Carchidio enters. Both salute. Carchidio tries to convince Kanzler, showing him a map but Kanzler refuses his proposals. Carchidio leaves and Kanzler sits back at his desk looking desperate.

3. Same set as 1. Carchidio exits the carriage and leaves on horseback to the right with his accompanying officers.

Intertitle: At the camp of the "bersaglieri": To Arms!

4. Missing shot replaced in the restored version by the following text: "Dawn of September 20, on the Via Nomentana The bugler sounds the alarms and the soldiers rush to the assault of the city, to the cry of: Long live Italy and Long live Rome!"

Intertitle: The last cannonade.

5. Missing shot replaced in the restored version by a production still showing a studio set with a group of soldiers firing a canon and in the background the city walls with the Porta Pia, and the following text: "The battery of cannons commanded by Major Luigi Pelloux opens from Villa Albani the breach in the walls of Porta Pia."

Intertitle: The breach at Porta Pia: To the assault!

6. On location shot. A large number of soldiers come running in from the left and enter the city through the breach in the wall.

Intertitle: The white flag.

7. Missing shot replaced in the restored version by the following text: Pius IX orders General Kanzler to hoist the white flag on the cross of St. Peter's dome.

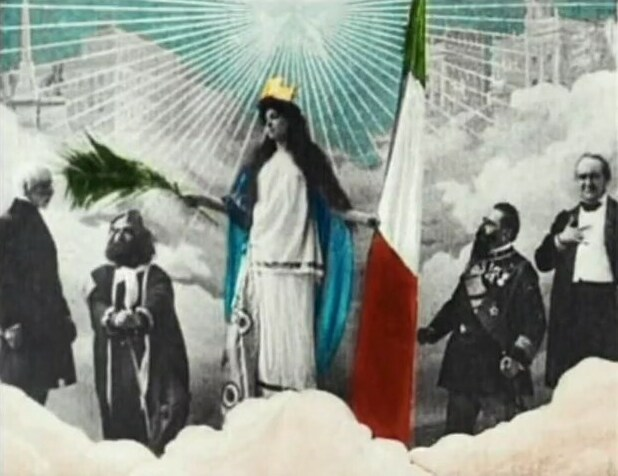
Apotheosis

Intertitle: The apotheosis.

8. Missing shot replaced in the restored version by the following text: "Free and independent Italy pays tribute to Cavour, to Vittorio Emanuele Il, to Garibaldi and Mazzini, its great creators, with the palm of victory and the applause of the people" and a colorized production still showing in the middle of clouds a young woman holding palms and a large Italian flag surrounded by fathers of the fatherland Count Cavour, Vittorio Emanuele II, Giuseppe Garibaldi and Giuseppe Mazzini.
