= Lost in the Dark (play) =

Lost in the Dark (Italian:Sperduti nel buio) is a 1901 play by the Italian writer Roberto Bracco. It has been turned into films twice: the 1914 silent Lost in the Dark, considered by some a precursor to Italian neorealism, and Lost in the Dark (1947).

== Bibliography ==
- Goble, Alan. The Complete Index to Literary Sources in Film. Walter de Gruyter, 1999.
