= Filoteo Alberini =

Italian filmmaker (1865–1937)

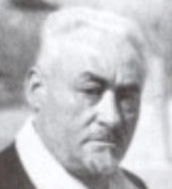
- Born: 14 March 1867; Orte, Lazio; Italy
- Died: 12 April 1937 (aged 72); Rome, Lazio; Italy
- Occupations: Inventor director
- Years active: 1904–1911

Filoteo Alberini (14 March 1867 – 12 April 1937) was an Italian inventor, movie director, and one of the earliest pioneers of cinema.

== Biography ==
Born in Orte, he began working as a handyman in his native town and, after completing the compulsory military service at the Military Engineers Department, he was hired at the Military Geographical Institute of Florence.

In 1894, inspired by Thomas Edison's kinetoscope (a "peepshow" machine which allowed to see moving frames through a lens), he patented his "kinetograph", a shooting and projecting device which could show moving images to multiple people simultaneously not unlike that of the Lumière brothers. Alberini built the kinetograph one year before the cinématograph invented by the Lumière brothers who, in turn, borrowed and expanded the idea for such a device from Léon Bouly. Due to a bureaucratic hitch, the Ministry of Industry and Commerce issued Alberini's patent (No. 245032) one year after Alberini's request, specifically in 1895, in the same year when the Lumières projected for the first time Workers Leaving the Lumière Factory. In the New York Times obituary, Filoteo Alberini is recognised as the inventor of motion pictures devices

In 1899, Alberini opened the first Italian movie theatre in Florence. In 1904, he opened 'Cinema Moderno', the first movie theatre in Rome.

Fascinated by his new invention and by the new art form, in 1904 Alberini and his friend Dante Santoni founded the Alberini and Santoni First Italian Manufacturing Company, renamed Cines in 1906. Cines was based in Rome.

In 1905 he directs La presa di Roma. The film was 250 meters long (against the average length of that time of 60 meters) and cost 500 lire. The film was divided into seven scenes, each representing some of the episodes of the capture of Rome, occurred on 20 September 1870, which was the final event of the long process of Italian unification. The seven scenes are:

- 1. The battle of Ponte Milvio
- 2. The rejection of surrender by the pontifical general Hermann Kanzler
- 3. The arrival of the Bersaglieri
- 4. The breach of Porta Pia
- 5. The entrance of the Bersaglieri in the City
- 6. The surrender of Pope Pius IX with the display of the white flag on the St. Peter's Basilica
- 7. The celebrations of Italian troops.

Among Alberini's other inventions there were the 'cinepanoramic' (a revolving lens system that expands the image on the screen, an ancestor of today's Vistavision), the 'cineclock' (a round film disk with many frames that could be viewed with a luminaire manual), and a device to be applied to cameras, a forerunner of sequential shooting. He died in Rome.

== Selected filmography ==
=== Director ===
- La Malia dell'oro (1905)
- Un Colloquio disturbato (1905)
- Ginnastica moderna (1905)
- La Presa di Roma (1905)
- Nell'assenza dei padroni (1905)
- Vendetta di suonatori (1906)
- Pierrot innamorato (1906)
- La Merca del bestiame nell'agro romano (1906)
- Concorso ippico (1906)
- La Cascata delle Marmore presso Terni (1906)
- L'Albero di Natale (1906)
- Visita dei reali di Grecia a Roma (1906)
- Inaugurazione dell'Esposizione di Catania (1907)

=== Cinematographer ===
- La presa di Roma (1905)
- Tom Butler (1906)
- Pranzo provvidenziale (1906)
- La pila elettrica (1906)
- La gitana (1906)
- Dopo un veglione (1906)
- Cuore e patria (1906)
- La confessione per telefono (1906)
- Nozze tragiche (1906)
- Il dessert di Lulù (1906)
- Il ratto di una sposa in bicicletta (1906)
- Le ore di una mondana (1906)
- Il pompiere di servizio (1906)
- Onore rusticano (1906)
- Otello (1906)
- Triste giovinezza (1907)
- Povera madre! (1909)
- Don Carlos (1909)
- Messalina (1910)
- Dramma alla frontiera (1910)

=== Producer ===
- Raffaello e la Fornarina (1907)
- Siegfried (1909)
- Il piccolo garibaldino (1909)
- Parsifal (1909)
- Lo stretto di Messina (1909)
- Brutus (1911)
