= Vittorio Calcina =

Italian filmmaker (1847–1916)

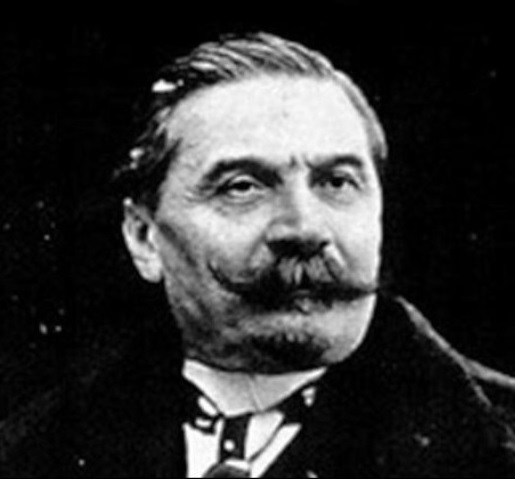
- Born: 31 December 1847; Turin, Piedmont; Italy
- Died: 31 December 1916 (aged 69); Milan, Lombardy; Italy
- Occupations: Filmmaker director
- Years active: 1896–1905

Vittorio Calcina (31 December 1847 – 31 December 1916) was the first Italian filmmaker in history.

== Biography ==
Born in Turin, Calcina was a photographer by profession, he was the Lumière brothers' representative for Italy from 1896. In that year:

- on 23 October 1896, Calcina asked the municipality of Brescia for the concession of the San Luca Hospital to carry out, in the rooms of the "Forza e Costanza" gymnasium, the screening with cinematograph of Il bagno di Diana by Giuseppe Filippi;
- on 7 November 1896 he organized a screening of about 20 films by the Lumière brothers in the former Hospice of Charity in via Po 33 in Turin.

He then became the official photographer of the House of Savoy, the Italian ruling dynasty from 1861 to 1946. In this role he filmed the first Italian film, Sua Maestà il Re Umberto e Sua Maestà la Regina Margherita a passeggio per il parco a Monza (English: His Majesty the King Umberto and Her Majesty the Queen Margherita strolling through the Monza Park), believed to have been lost until it was rediscovered by the Cineteca Nazionale in 1979.

He ended his career as a short film director in 1905, when he resumed the activity of representative of the Lumière brothers in Italy. He died in Milan and was buried in Turin.

== Filmography ==
List of films made by Calcina:

- 1896: Sua Maestà il Re Umberto e Sua Maestà la Regina Margherita a passeggio per il parco a Monza
- 1897: Le principi di Napoli a Firenze
- 1898: Varo della Emanuele Filiberto a Castellammare
- 1898: L'entrata dell'esposizione di Torino
- 1898: Ciclisti romani in arrivo a Torino
- 1899: Il re alla rivista delle truppe reduci dalle grandi manovre l'8 settembre 1899
- 1899: La passione di Cristo
- 1900: Il corteo funebre di accompagnamento alla salma di re Umberto
- 1901: La nave Stella Polare del Duca degli Abruzzi
- 1905: Il terremoto in Calabria

== See also ==
- Cinema of Italy
- Lumière brothers
