= Lost in the Dark (1914 film) =

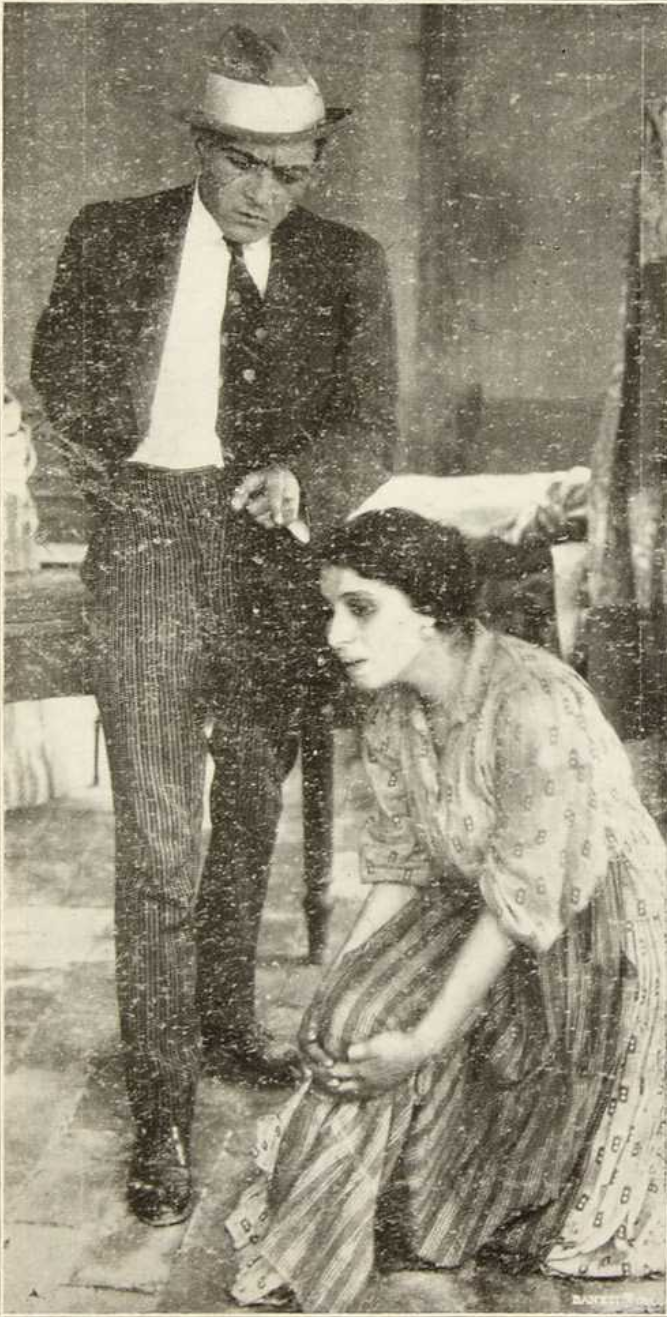
- Directed by: Nino Martoglio
- Written by: Roberto Bracco (play and screenplay)
- Starring: Giovanni Grasso Sr.; Maria Carmi; Virginia Balestrieri
- Edited by: Nino Martoglio
- Music by: E. de Leva
- Production company: Morgana Films
- Release date: November 1914
- Running time: 66 minutes
- Country: Italy
- Languages: Silent; Italian intertitles

Lost in the Dark (Italian: Sperduti nel buio) is a 1914 Italian silent drama film directed by Nino Martoglio and starring Giovanni Grasso Sr., Maria Carmi and Virginia Balestrieri. Documenting life in the slums of Naples, it is considered a precursor to the Italian neorealism movement of the 1940s and 1950s. The only known surviving copy of this film was destroyed by Nazi German forces during World War II. The film is based on a 1901 play of the same title by Roberto Bracco.

== Cast ==
- Giovanni Grasso Sr. as Nunzio the blind man
- Maria Carmi as Livia Blanchard
- Virginia Balestrieri as Paolina
- Vittorina Moneta as Paolina's mother
- Dillo Lombardi as Duke of Vallenza
- Totò Majorana as Nunzio's stepfather
- Gina Benvenuti as Nunzio's mother
- Maria Balistrieri
- Ettore Mazzanti

== Bibliography ==
- Reich, Jacqueline & Garofalo, Piero. Re-viewing Fascism: Italian Cinema, 1922-1943. Indiana University Press, 2002.
