= Roberto Bracco =

Italian playwright, screenwriter and journalist (1861–1943)

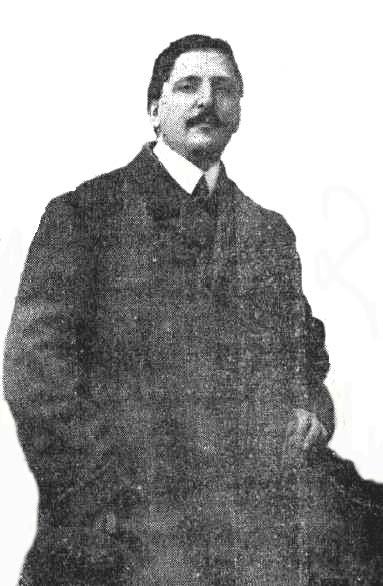
- Born: 10 November 1861; Naples, Campania; Italy
- Died: 20 April 1943 (aged 81); Sorrento, Campania; Italy
- Occupation: Writer

Roberto Bracco (1861–1943) was an Italian playwright, screenwriter and journalist. A number of his plays were turned into films, and he worked on the scripts of several of them including the 1914 silent Lost in the Dark. He was nominated for the Nobel Prize in Literature six times.

Also among his works is Un Perfetto Amore, a dramatic dialogue in three acts.

== Selected filmography ==
- Lost in the Dark (1914)

== Bibliography ==
- Goble, Alan. The Complete Index to Literary Sources in Film. Walter de Gruyter, 1999.
