= 1917 in film =

1917 in film was a particularly fruitful year for the art form, and is often cited as one of the years in the decade which contributed to the medium the most, along with 1913. Secondarily the year saw a limited global embrace of narrative film-making and featured innovative techniques such as continuity cutting. Primarily, the year is an American landmark, as 1917 is the first year where the narrative and visual style is typified as "Classical Hollywood".

== Events ==
- January – Panthea is released, the first film from the company that Joseph Schenck formed with his wife, Norma Talmadge, after leaving Loew's Consolidated Enterprises.
- February – Buster Keaton first meets Roscoe "Fatty" Arbuckle in New York and is hired as a co-star and gag man.
- April 9 – Supreme Court of the United States rule in Motion Picture Patents Co. v. Universal Film Manufacturing Co. which ends the Motion Picture Patents Company appeal and results in the end of the company.
- April 23 – Release in the United States of the short The Butcher Boy, the first of Roscoe "Fatty" Arbuckle's series of films with the Comique Film Corporation, and Buster Keaton's film debut.
- April 25 – Thomas Lincoln Tally, in a meeting in New York, co-founds the First National Exhibitors Circuit.
- June – Thomas H. Ince and Mack Sennett leave Triangle Film Corporation following Stephen Andrew Lynch taking control.
- September 13 – Release in the United States of The Gulf Between, the first film made in Technicolor System 1, a two-color process.
- November 9 – World's first feature-length animated film is made in Argentina by Quirino Cristiani (El Apóstol)
- December 18 – Foundation of Universum Film AG (UƒA), as a propaganda film company, in Berlin.
- Movette, another revision of the 17.5 mm film format, is made available.

== Top-grossing films (U.S.) ==
The top five 1917 released films by box office gross in North America are as follows:

Highest-grossing films of 1917
Rank	Title	Studio	Domestic rentals
1	Cleopatra	Fox Film	$1,000,000
2	The Little American	Paramount	$446,236
3	A Romance of the Redwoods	Paramount	$424,718
4	The Woman God Forgot	Paramount	$340,504
5	The Devil Stone	Paramount	$296,031

== Notable films ==
Films produced in the United States unless stated otherwise

=== # ===
- '49–'17, directed by Ruth Ann Baldwin

=== A ===
- The Adventurer, directed by and starring Charlie Chaplin, with Edna Purviance
- All Aboard, directed by Alfred J. Goulding, starring Harold Lloyd and Bebe Daniels
- El Apóstol (The Apostle) (lost), animated film directed by Quirino Cristiani – (Argentina)

=== B ===
- Bestia (US: The Polish Dancer), directed by Aleksander Hertz, starring Pola Negri – (Poland)
- Betsy Ross, directed by Travers Vale and George Cowl, starring Alice Brady
- Bucking Broadway, directed by John Ford, starring Harry Carey

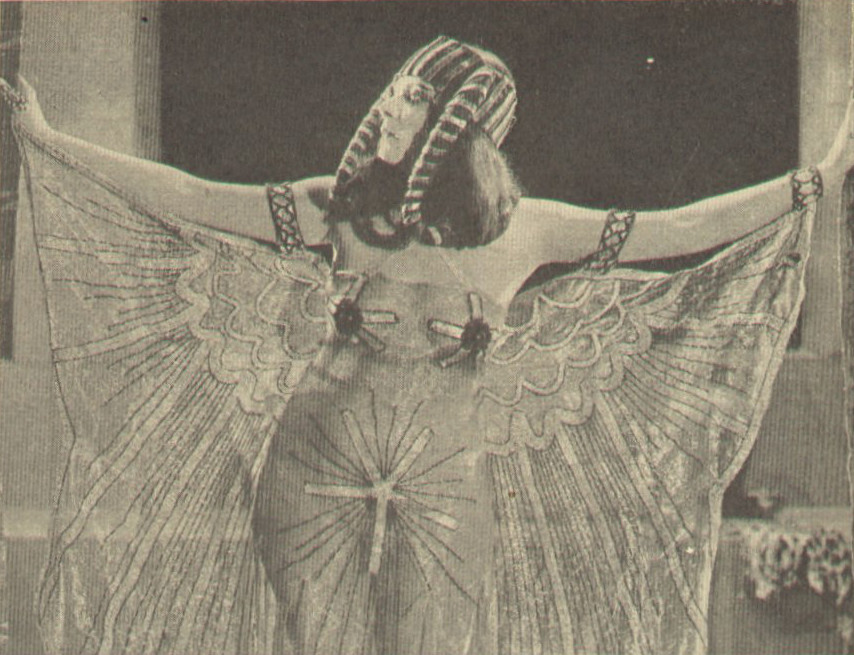
Theda Bara as Cleopatra

- The Butcher Boy, directed by and starring Fatty Arbuckle, with Buster Keaton

=== C ===
- Cleopatra (incomplete), directed by J. Gordon Edwards, starring Theda Bara
- Coney Island, directed by and starring Fatty Arbuckle, with Buster Keaton
- The Cure, directed by and starring Charlie Chaplin, with Edna Purviance

=== D ===
- Down to Earth, directed by John Emerson, starring Douglas Fairbanks

=== E ===
- Easy Street, directed by and starring Charlie Chaplin, with Edna Purviance

=== F ===
- Fear (Furcht), directed by Robert Wiene, starring Conrad Veidt – (Germany)

=== G ===
- Golden Rule Kate, directed by Reginald Barker, starring Louise Glaum
- The Gulf Between (incomplete), directed by Wray Physioc

=== H ===
- The Heart of Texas Ryan, directed by E.A. Martin, starring Tom Mix
- Hilde Warren and Death (Hilde Warren und der Tod), directed by Joe May, starring Mia May – (Germany)
- His Wedding Night, directed by and starring Fatty Arbuckle, with Buster Keaton

=== I ===
- The Immigrant, directed by and starring Charlie Chaplin, with Edna Purviance

=== L ===
- The Little American, directed by Cecil B. DeMille, starring Mary Pickford
- A Little Princess, directed by Marshall Neilan, starring Mary Pickford, Norman Kerry and ZaSu Pitts

=== M ===
- The Man from Painted Post, directed by Joseph Henabery, starring Douglas Fairbanks
- A Man There Was (Terje Vigen), directed by and starring Victor Sjöström – (Sweden)
- The Man Without a Country, directed by Ernest C. Warde, starring Florence La Badie
- A Modern Musketeer, directed by Allan Dwan, starring Douglas Fairbanks
- Mothers of Men, directed by Willis Robards, starring Dorothy Davenport

=== O ===
- Oh Doctor!, directed by and starring Fatty Arbuckle, with Buster Keaton

=== P ===
- The Poor Little Rich Girl, directed by Maurice Tourneur, starring Mary Pickford
- The Pride of the Clan, directed by Maurice Tourneur, starring Mary Pickford and Matt Moore

=== R ===
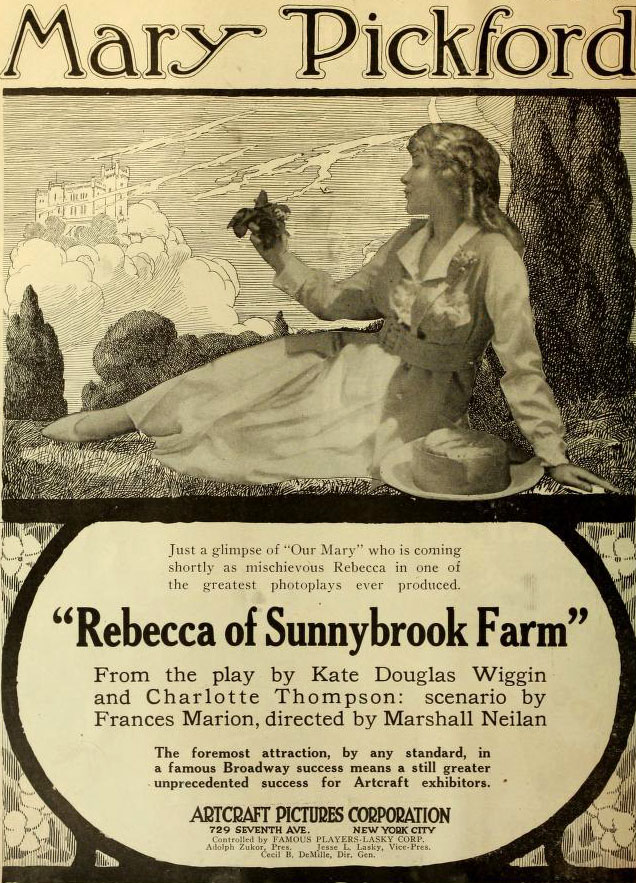
Advertisement, August 1917

- Raffles, the Amateur Cracksman, directed by George Irving, starring John Barrymore
- Reaching for the Moon, directed by John Emerson, starring Douglas Fairbanks
- Rebecca of Sunnybrook Farm, directed by Marshall Neilan, starring Mary Pickford
- A Reckless Romeo, directed by and starring Fatty Arbuckle
- A Romance of the Redwoods, directed by Cecil B. DeMille, starring Mary Pickford
- The Rough House, directed by and starring Fatty Arbuckle and Buster Keaton
- Runaway Romany, directed by George Lederer, starring Marion Davies

=== S ===
- Satan Triumphant (Satana likuyushchiy) (incomplete), directed by Yakov Protazanov – (USSR)
- The Scarlet Car, directed by Joseph De Grasse, starring Lon Chaney
- Seven Keys to Baldpate, directed by Hugh Ford, starring George M. Cohan and Anna Q. Nilsson; based on the 1913 novel by Earl Derr Biggers
- The Silent Man, directed by and starring William S. Hart
- Straight Shooting, directed by John Ford, starring Harry Carey
- The Sultan's Wife, directed by Clarence Badger, starring Gloria Swanson

=== T ===
- Teddy at the Throttle, directed by Clarence Badger, starring Gloria Swanson and Wallace Beery
- Thaïs, directed by Anton Giulio Bragaglia – (Italy)
- Tom Sawyer, directed by William Desmond Taylor, starring Jack Pickford; based on the 1876 novel The Adventures of Tom Sawyer by Mark Twain

=== W ===
- Wild and Woolly, directed by John Emerson, starring Douglas Fairbanks
- The Woman God Forgot, directed by Cecil B. DeMille, starring Geraldine Farrar
- The Woman in White, directed by Ernest C. Warde, starring Florence La Badie; based on the 1860 novel by Wilkie Collins

== Selected films with 1917 release dates ==
United States unless stated

- January 8 – Great Expectations, starring Jack Pickford
- January 22 – Easy Street, starring Charlie Chaplin, Edna Purviance
- January 22 – Her Right to Live, directed by Paul Scardon, starring Peggy Hyland, Antonio Moreno, Mae Costello, John S. Robertson
- January 29 – A Man There Was (Terje Vigen), directed by Victor Sjöström – (Sweden)
- February 2 – The Marriage of Luise Rohrbach, directed by Rudolf Biebrach, starring Henny Porten, Emil Jannings – (Germany)
- February 18 – The Bad Boy, starring Robert Harron, Mildred Harris, Colleen Moore
- March 3 – The Tornado, directed by John Ford (his debut)
- March 5 – The Poor Little Rich Girl, starring Mary Pickford
- March 7 – The Torture of Silence (Mater Dolorosa), directed by Abel Gance – (France)
- April 15 – Teddy at the Throttle, a Keystone comedy starring Gloria Swanson
- April 16 – The Cure, a Charlie Chaplin short.
- April 23 – The Butcher Boy, starring "Fatty" Arbuckle with Buster Keaton
- May 7 – Kidnapped, directed by Alan Crosland, starring Raymond McKee, Joseph Burke, and Ray Hallor
- May 14 – A Romance of the Redwoods, directed by Cecil B. DeMille, starring Mary Pickford
- May 19 – One Law for Both directed by Ivan Abramson
- May 20 – Souls Triumphant, starring Lillian Gish
- May 21 – A Reckless Romeo, a 'Fatty' Arbuckle short.
- May – Frank Hansen's Fortune directed by Viggo Larsen – (Germany)
- June 17 – The Immigrant, starring Charlie Chaplin and Edna Purviance
- June 24 – Wild and Woolly, starring Douglas Fairbanks
- June 25 – A Kentucky Cinderella, starring Ruth Clifford
- June 25 – The Rough House, a 'Fatty' Arbuckle / Buster Keaton short.
- June – The Labour Leader, directed by Thomas Bentley, starring Owen Nares, Fay Compton – (GB)
- July 5 – Big Timber
- July – The Picture of Dorian Gray (Das Bildnis des Dorian Gray) – (Germany)
- August 12 – Golden Rule Kate, a drama western starring Louise Glaum
- August 20 – His Wedding Night, a 'Fatty' Arbuckle / Buster Keaton short.
- August 27 – The Little American, starring Mary Pickford; directed by Cecil B. DeMille.
- August 27 – Straight Shooting, directed by John Ford
- August 28 – Brcko in Zagreb – (Croatia)
- August – The Gay Lord Quex directed by Maurice Elvey and starring Ben Webster and Irene Vanbrugh – (GB)
- September 13 – The Gulf Between, All color movie.
- September 22 – Rebecca of Sunnybrook Farm, starring Mary Pickford
- September 30 – Camille, starring Theda Bara
- September 30 – Oh Doctor!, a 'Fatty' Arbuckle / Buster Keaton short.
- September 30 – The Sultan's Wife, starring Gloria Swanson
- September – Fear directed by Robert Wiene and starring Conrad Veidt – (Germany)
- October 14 – Cleopatra, starring Theda Bara
- October 21 – Satan Triumphant (Satana likuyushchiy) – (U.S.S.R.)
- October 22 – The Adventurer, a Charlie Chaplin short.
- October 29 – Coney Island, a 'Fatty' Arbuckle / Buster Keaton short.
- November 9 – El Apóstol (The Apostle), animated by Quirino Cristiani – (Argentina)
- November 11 – A Little Princess, directed by Marshall Neilan, starring Mary Pickford, Norman Kerry, ZaSu Pitts
- November 12 – Harrison and Barrison, directed by Alexander Korda, starring Márton Rátkai – (Hungary)
- November 25 – All Aboard, a Harold Lloyd short
- November 26 – The Silent Man, starring William S. Hart
- December 10 – Tom Sawyer, starring Jack Pickford
- December 24 – Bucking Broadway, directed by John Ford, starring Harry Carey
- December – Raffles the Amateur Cracksman, starring John Barrymore

== Comedy film series ==
- Harold Lloyd (1913–1938)
- Charlie Chaplin (1914–1940)
- Lupino Lane (1915–1939)
- Buster Keaton (1917–1944)

== Births ==
- January 2 – Vera Zorina, German-Norwegian ballerina, theatre film actress, and choreographer (died 2003)
- January 3 – Jesse White, American actor (died 1997)
- January 5 – Jane Wyman, American actress (died 2007)
- January 10 – Hilde Krahl, Austrian actress (died 1999)
- January 21 – Lally Bowers, English actress and singer (died 1984)
- January 24 – Ernest Borgnine, American actor (died 2012)
- February 6 – Zsa Zsa Gabor, Hungarian-American socialite and actress (died 2016)
- February 15 – Sam Kydd, British actor (died 1982)
- February 16 – George N. Neise, American actor (died 1996)
- February 21 – Lucille Bremer, American actress and dancer (died 1996)
- February 25 – Brenda Joyce, American actress (died 2009)
- March 2 – Desi Arnaz, Cuban-American actor, musician, producer, and bandleader (died 1986)
- March 12 – Googie Withers, English actress and dancer (died 2011)
- March 22
  - Virginia Grey, American actress (died 2004)
  - Paul Rogers, English actor (died 2013)
- March 23 – Kenneth Tobey, American actor (died 2002)
- March 30 – Herbert Anderson, American character actor (died 1994)
- April 2 - Dabbs Greer, American character actor (died 2007)
- April 9 – Brad Dexter, American actor and film producer (died 2002)
- April 14 – Valerie Hobson, British actress (died 1998)
- April 15 – Hans Conried, American actor and comedian (died 1982)
- April 16 – William Benedict, American actor (died 1999)
- April 17 – R. G. Armstrong, American character actor and playwright (died 2012)
- April 28 – Robert Cornthwaite, American actor (died 2006)
- April 29
  - Celeste Holm, American actress (died 2012)
  - Maya Deren, American experimental filmmaker (died 1961)
- May 1 – Danielle Darrieux, French actress, singer and dancer (died 2017)
- May 3 – Leopoldo Trieste, Italian actor, film director and script writer (died 2003)
- May 5 - June Lang, American actress (died 2005)
- May 7 - David Tomlinson, English actor and comedian (died 2000)
- May 10 – Margo, Mexican actress and dancer (died 1985)
- May 16 – George Gaynes, Dutch-American singer, actor, and voice artist (died 2016)
- May 18 – James Donald, Scottish actor (died 1993)
- May 21 – Raymond Burr, Canadian actor (died 1993)
- May 22 -
  - Nathan Davis (actor), American actor (died 2008)
  - Sid Melton, American actor (died 2011)
- May 25 – Steve Cochran, American actor (died 1965)
- June 2 - Max Showalter, American actor and musician (died 2000)
- June 3 – Leo Gorcey, actor, comedian (died 1969)
- June 7 – Dean Martin, American singer, actor, and comedian (died 1995)
- June 8 – George D. Wallace, American actor (died 2005)
- June 18
  - Richard Boone, American actor (died 1981)
  - Ross Elliott, American character actor (died 1999)
- June 22 – Russell Wade, American actor (died 2006)
- June 30
  - Lena Horne, American singer, actress, dancer and civil rights activist (died 2010)
  - Susan Hayward, American actress (died 1975)
- July 1 – Virginia Dale, American actress (died 1994)
- July 8 – Faye Emerson, American actress (died 1983)
- July 17 – Phyllis Diller, American stand-up comedian, actress, author, musician and visual artist (died 2012)
- July 20 – Paul Hubschmid, Swiss actor (died 2001)
- July 26 – Lorna Gray, American actress (died 2017)
- July 27 – Bourvil, French actor and singer (died 1970)
- August 6 – Robert Mitchum, American actor (died 1997)
- August 8 – Earl Cameron, Bermudian actor (died 2020)
- August 12 – Marjorie Reynolds, American actress (died 1997)
- August 13 – Gloria Dickson, American actress (died 1945)
- August 17 – Gianni Agus, Italian actor (died 1994)
- August 25 – Mel Ferrer, American actor, director, and producer (died 2008)
- September 9 – Rolf Wenkhaus, German child actor (died 1942)
- September 11 – Herbert Lom, Czech-British actor (died 2012)
- September 18 - June Foray, American voice actress (died 2017)
- October 2 – Charles Drake, American actor (died 1994)
- October 7
  - Helmut Dantine, Austrian-American actor (died 1982)
  - June Allyson, American actress (died 2006)
- October 11 - J. Edward McKinley, American character actor (died 2004)
- October 16 – Alice Pearce, American actress (died 1966)
- October 17 – Marsha Hunt, American actress (died 2022)
- October 22 – Joan Fontaine, British-American actress (died 2013)
- October 24 – John Alvin, American actor (died 2009)
- October 26 – Virgílio Teixeira, Portuguese actor (died 2010)
- November 2 – Ann Rutherford, Canadian-American actress (died 2012)
- November 4 –
  - Leonardo Cimino, American actor (died 2012)
  - Virginia Field, British actress (died 1992)
- November 13 – Robert Sterling, American actor (died 2006)
- November 30 - Ilse Steppat, German actress (died 1969)
- December 7 – Hurd Hatfield, American actor (died 1998)
- December 12 – Margaret Marquis, Canadian-American actress (died 1993)
- December 13 - John Hart, American actor (died 2009)
- December 18 - Ossie Davis, American actor, director, writer, and activist (died 2005)
- December 22 – Frankie Darro, American actor (died 1976)
- December 28 - Kim Chan, Chinese-American actor and producer (died 2008)

== Deaths ==
- February 21 – Fred Mace, 38, American actor & comedian, What Happened to Jones, His Last Scent, A Lover's Might, The Love Comet
- March 6 – Valdemar Psilander, 32, Danish actor, Rytterstatuen, Lykken, Lydia, Klovnen, Favoriten, In Defense of a Nation, John Redmond, the Evangelist
- July 2 – Herbert Beerbohm Tree, 64, English stage & screen actor, Beerbohm Tree, The Great English Actor; Henry VIII; Macbeth; Trilby; The Old Folks at Home
- October 13 – Florence La Badie, 29, American actress, The Man Without a Country, War and the Woman, The Woman in White, When Love Was Blind
- October 25 – Jack Standing, 31, English actor, With Hoops of Steel, The Curse of Eve, The Innocent Sinner, The Price of Her Soul, One Touch of Sin
- November 5 – Howell Hansel, 46, American actor and director
- November 18 – Nino Oxilia, 28, Italian director, Rapsodia satanica, Blue Blood
- December 20 – Eric Campbell, 38, Scottish actor, The Immigrant, Behind the Screen, The Count, Easy Street, The Adventurer(short), The Cure(short)

== Film debuts ==
- Maude Allen – The Moth
- Mabel Ballin – When Bobby Broke His Arm
- Wesley Barry – Rebecca of Sunnybrook Farm
- Marjorie Bennett – The Girl, Glory
- Mercedes Brignone – Hamlet
- Eduardo Ciannelli – The Food Gamblers
- Jackie Coogan – Skinner's Baby
- Ricardo Cortez – The Fringe of Society
- Marion Davies – Runaway Romany
- Vittorio De Sica – The Clemenceau Affair
- Jean Del Val – The Fortunes of Fifi
- Cleo Desmond – The Easiest Way
- Rachel Devirys – La grande vedette
- Richard Dix – One of Many
- Annie Esmond – Dawn
- Fritz Feld – The Golem and the Dancing Girl
- Helen Ferguson – Filling His Own Shoes
- John Ford (director) – Straight Shooting
- J. Morris Foster – The Gray Ghost
- Mona Geijer-Falkner – Alexander den store
- Ferdinand Gottschalk – Please Help Emily
- Ray Hallor – Kidnapped
- Charles Halton – The Adventurer
- Taylor Holmes – Fools for Luck
- Leslie Howard – The Happy Warrior
- Isabel Jeans – The Profligate
- Buck Jones – A Rough Shod Fighter
- Buster Keaton – The Butcher Boy
- Madge Kennedy – Baby Mine
- Raymond Lee – The Babes in the Woods
- Bela Lugosi – Leoni Leo
- Bert Lytell – The Lone Wolf
- May McAvoy – Hate
- Rex McDougall – Please Help Emily
- Bull Montana – In Again, Out Again
- Chester Morris – An Amateur Orphan
- Pinna Nesbit – The Page Mystery
- ZaSu Pitts – Rebecca of Sunnybrook Farm
- Marjorie Rambeau – The Greater Woman
- Forrest Seabury – The Girl and the Crisis
- Gustav von Seyffertitz – Down to Earth
- Henry Stephenson – The Spreading Dawn
- Zeffie Tilbury – Blind Man's Luck
- Virginia Valli – Filling His Own Shoes
- Amy Veness – Please Help Emily
- Clifton Webb – National Red Cross Pageant
- Marjorie Wood – National Red Cross Pageant
- Loretta Young – The Primrose Ring
