= List of Italian films of 1917 =

A list of films produced in Italy in 1917 (see 1917 in film):

Title	Director	Cast	Genre	Notes
1917
...e la civetta cantò				
A Santa Lucia				
Addio, mia bella Napoli!...				
Ah! le donne!				
Hamlet	Eleuterio Rodolfi	Ruggero Ruggeri, Helena Makowska	Drama	
Thaïs	Anton Giulio Bragaglia			Only surviving example of Italian Futurist cinema
The Clemenceau Affair	Alfredo De Antoni			Onscreen debut of Vittorio De Sica
The Thirteenth Man	Carmine Gallone			
