= Romance of the Redwoods =

Romance of the Redwoods may refer to:

- A Romance of the Redwoods, a 1917 American silent drama film
- Romance of the Redwoods (1939 film), an American film
