= Thaïs (1917 Italian film) =

1917 film by Anton Bragaglia

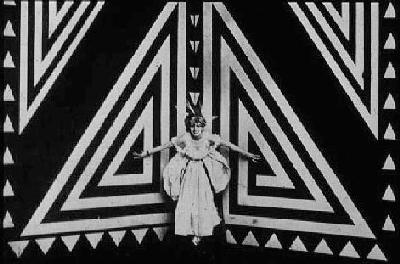
- A scene from the movie
- Directed by: Anton Giulio Bragaglia
- Written by: Riccardo Cassano
- Starring: Thaïs Galitzky
- Release date: 1917
- Running time: 105 minutes
- Country: Italy
- Language: Silent

Thaïs is a 1917 Italian silent film directed by Anton Giulio Bragaglia. The movie is the sole surviving Italian Futurist film, and currently kept at the Cinémathèque Française. It is not based on the novel of the same name by Anatole France.

== Plot ==
The surviving footage from Thaïs

The plot is fairly conventional and refers to the love stories of turbid "diva-film" typical of the period.

The beautiful Slavic countess Vera Preobrajenska (played by Thaïs Galitzy) is a seductress of married men, dragging them to the brink of ruin. Vera resolves to seduce Count San Remo, the lover of her best friend, the Countess Bianca Stagno-Bellincioni (played by Ileana Leonidoff). Bianca, in the midst of depression, falls off her horse and dies. Vera feels guilty and commits suicide.

== Characteristics ==
The film sets are characteristic of the Futurist movement. They were designed by Enrico Prampolini who used geometric shapes based on a strong black/white contrast: spiral, diamond, chess, symbolic figures (cats, masks spewing smoke). Painted scenes often interact with the characters, creating a world of illusions where it is difficult to distinguish fact from fiction. As the film progresses, it becomes more and more abstract to reflect Vera's increasing confusion.

The oppressive and anti naturalistic visions can be seen as a preamble to the German expressionist cinema, which was notably inspired by the style of Prampolini.

== Gallery ==
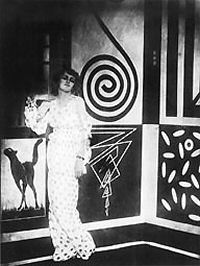
A scene from Thaïs

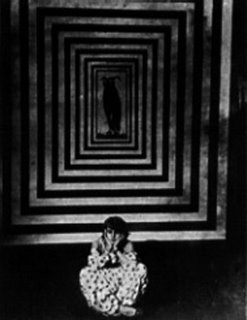
A scene from Thaïs

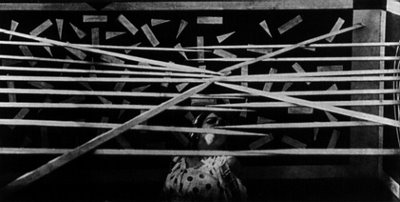
A lattice of pointed poles

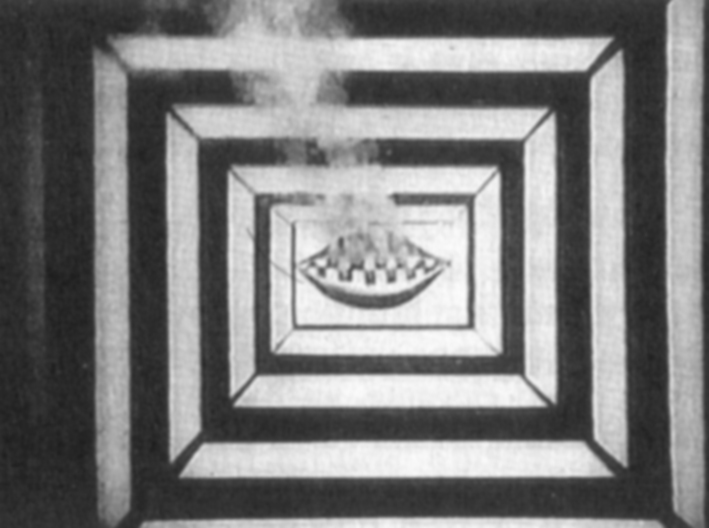
A scene with real smoke

== See also ==
- Drama in the Futurists' Cabaret No. 13 (sole surviving Russian Futurist film, albeit partially lost)
- Thais (1917 American film)
- Thaïs (opera)

== Bibliography ==
- Sandro Bernardi, L'avventura del cinematografo, Marsilio Editori, Venezia 2007. ISBN 978-88-317-9297-4
- G. Aristarco, Teoria futurista e film d'avanguardia, ne «La Biennale di Venezia» n. 36/37 Luglio- Dicembre, Venezia, 1959
- A. Bernardini, Cinema muto italiano, 3 vol., Laterza, Bari-Roma, 1980/81
- R. Campari, Il fantasma del bello: iconologia del cinema italiano, Marsilio, Venezia, 1994
- G. Lista, Cinema e fotografia futurista, Skira, Milano, 2001
- M. Macola, Prima mostra di scenotecnica futurista, in «Il Secolo XIX», Genova, 11 febbraio 1933
- F. T. Marinetti, Anton Giulio Bragaglia, in «Futurismo», n. 9, 6 novembre 1931
- C. Tisdall e A. Bozzolla, Futurismo, Skira, Milano, 2003
- M. Verdone e AAVV, La casa d’arte Bragaglia, Bulzoni, Roma, 1992
- M. Verdone, Cinema e letteratura del futurismo, Manfrini, Calliano, Trento, 1990
