= My Uncle Barbassous =

1921 film

- Directed by: Riccardo Cassano
- Starring: Carmen Boni
- Cinematography: César Sforza
- Production company: Chimera Film
- Distributed by: Chimera Film
- Release date: October 1921
- Country: Italy
- Languages: Silent; Italian intertitles

My Uncle Barbassous (Italian: Mio zio Barbassous) is a 1921 Italian silent film directed by Riccardo Cassano and starring Carmen Boni.

== Cast ==
- Carmen Boni
- Nino Camarda
- Myosa De Coudray
- Elena Sangro

== Bibliography ==
- Stewart, John. Italian film: a who's who. McFarland, 1994.
