= Straight Shooting =

1917 film directed by John Ford

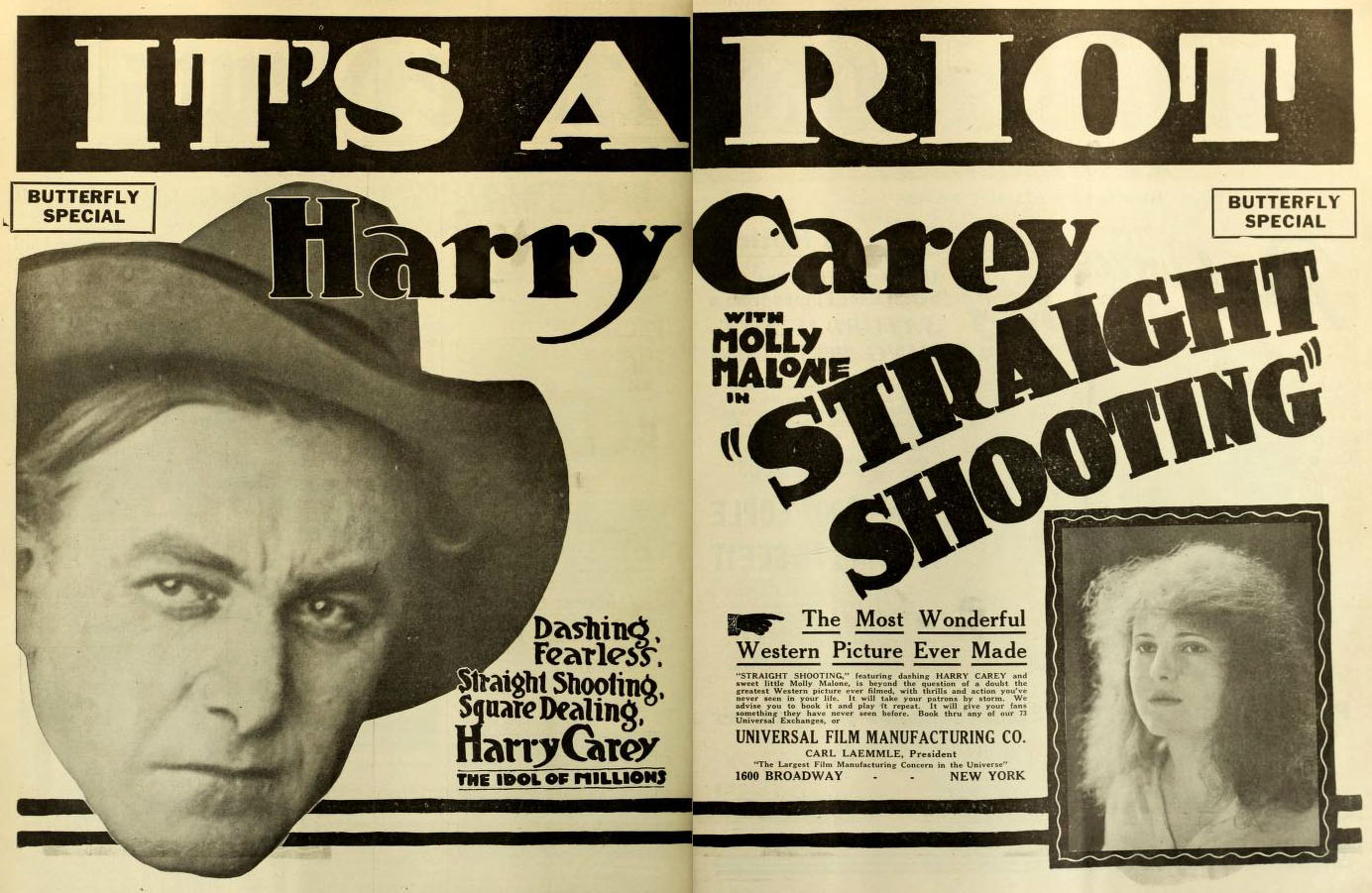
- Film advertisement
- Directed by: John Ford
- Written by: George Hively
- Starring: Harry Carey; Hoot Gibson
- Cinematography: Ben F. Reynolds; George Scott
- Distributed by: Universal Pictures
- Release date: August 27, 1917
- Running time: 57 minutes
- Country: United States
- Language: Silent (English intertitles)

Straight Shooting (1917) by John Ford

Straight Shooting is a 1917 American silent Western film directed by John Ford and featuring Harry Carey. Prints of this film survive in the International Museum of Photography and Film at the George Eastman Museum. Like many American films of the time, Straight Shooting was subject to cuts by city and state film censorship boards. The Chicago Board of Censors refused to issue a permit for this film as submitted as it consists of detailed portrayal of murder and outlawry.

== Plot ==
At the end of the 19th century in the Far West, a farmer is fighting for his right to plough the plains. In order to expel the farmers, the ranchers try to control access to water.

== Cast ==
- Harry Carey as Harry "Cheyenne Harry" Henderson
- Duke R. Lee as "Thunder" Flint (credited as Duke Lee)
- George Berrell as "Sweet Water" Sims
- Molly Malone as Joan Sims
- Ted Brooks as Ted Sims
- Hoot Gibson as Danny Morgan (credits)/Sam Turner (titles)
- Milton Brown as Pete "Black-Eye Pete" (credited as Milt Brown)
- Vester Pegg as Placer Fremont

== Production ==
John Ford's older brother Francis proposed John to direct the film after the first director left. Harry Carey and John Ford hit it off immediately and continued to work together after the success of the film. Carey mentored Ford "he tutored me in the early years sort of brought me along".

Most of the exterior sets were built and the film was shot on the Universal backlot. Ford concocted a scheme to make a feature-length film out of what was budgeted to be a two reel film by telling Universal some of the exposed film had fallen in a river. When Universal realized that they had a full-length film on their hands, the studio was upset. Studio executive Carl Laemmle pointed out that, if he paid for a suit and got an extra pair of pants, he wouldn't just throw them away.

== See also ==
- Harry Carey filmography
- Hoot Gibson filmography
