= La mosca d'oro =

1921 film

- Directed by: Riccardo Cassano
- Produced by: Chimera Film
- Starring: Eugenio Bandini; Myosa De Coudray; Fernanda Fassy; Giacomo Origoni
- Cinematography: César Sforza
- Distributed by: Chimera Film
- Release date: 1921
- Country: Italy
- Language: Italian

La mosca d'oro (The Fly Gold) is a 1921 Italian silent film directed by Riccardo Cassano and starring Eugenio Bandini, Myosa De Coudray and Fernanda Fassy.
