= Newman Levy =

American lawyer

- Born: November 30, 1888; Manhattan, New York City, New York, U.S.
- Died: March 22, 1966 (aged 77)
- Education: New York University School of Law
- Occupations: Lawyer; Poet; Playwright; Essayist
- Known for: Opera Guyed; Theatre Guyed; Gay But Wistful Verses
- Parent: Abraham Levy

Newman Levy (November 30, 1888 – March 22, 1966) was an American lawyer, poet, playwright and essayist.

Levy followed his father, well-known criminal attorney Abraham Levy, into law, but also pursued his own dreams of being a writer. Born in Manhattan, he graduated from New York University School of Law in 1911 and worked as an Assistant District Attorney, but found time to write three books of light verse and an autobiography. He socialized with New York's literary elite, and collaborated with Edna Ferber on $1200 a Year: A Comedy in Three Acts. When George Gershwin asked "I wonder if my music will be played a hundred years from now?" he is said to have answered, "Yes, if you're around to play it!"

== Levy's Works ==
His verse and short fiction was published in The New Yorker and also collected in three books: Opera Guyed, Theatre Guyed, and Gay But Wistful Verses.

His papers are collected at the Fales Library.

=== Thais ===
Levy's poetical review of the opera Thaïs by Massenet is arguably his best known work. The complex rhyme scheme, light approach to a tragic opera, and bouncy tune helped popularize it.

One time, in Alexandria, in wicked Alexandria,
Where nights were wild with revelry and life was but a game,
There lived, so the report is, an adventuress and courtesan,
The pride of Alexandria, and Thais was her name.

And the tragic ending of Thaïs is reduced to a rueful reflection on missed chances:

The monk says, "That's a joke on me, for that there dame to croak on me.
I hadn't oughter passed her up the time I had the chance."

== Bibliography ==
=== Poetry ===
Collections

- Levy, Newman (1925). Gay but wistful : verses. New York: Alfred A. Knopf.
- Levy, Newman (1923). Opera Guyed. New York: Alfred A. Knopf.
- — (1949). Theatre guyed. Alfred A. Knopf.

List of poems

Title	Year	First published	Reprinted/collected
Song of the traffic rules	1925	Levy, Newman (March 14, 1925). "Song of the traffic rules". The New Yorker. Vol. 1, no. 4. p. 18.	

=== Memoirs ===
- Levy, Newman (1958). My double life : adventures in law and letters. Garden City, New York: Doubleday.

=== Essays and reporting ===
- Levy, Newman (March 7, 1925). "Forgotten celebrities". The New Yorker. Vol. 1, no. 3. pp. 15–16.
- — (April 4, 1925). "The adventures of a play juror". The New Yorker. Vol. 1, no. 7. pp. 19–20.
- — (May 2, 1925). "Diary of a New Yorker". The New Yorker. Vol. 1, no. 11. p. 21.
- — (June 6, 1925). "Versatility personified". Profiles. The New Yorker. Vol. 1, no. 16. pp. 9–10. Deems Taylor.

=== True Crime ===
The Nan Patterson Case New York: Simon and Schuster, 1959

=== Critical studies and reviews of Levy's work ===
- "[Untitled review of My double life]". Kirkus Review.
