= Thaïs (novel) =

1890 novel by Anatole France

- Author: Anatole France
- Publication date: 1890
- Pages: 350

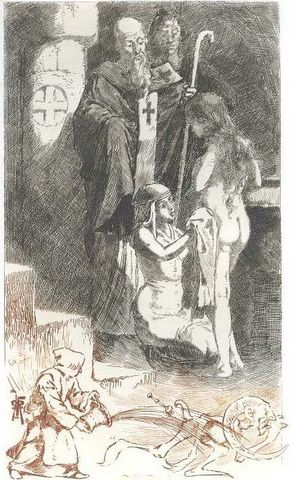
Illustration by Martin van Maële for a 1901 edition of the novel

Thaïs is a novel by French writer Anatole France, published in 1890. It is based on events in the life of Saint Thaïs of Egypt, a legendary convert to Christianity who is said to have lived in the 4th century. It was the inspiration for the 1894 namesake opera by Jules Massenet.

== Summary ==
Paphnuce, an ascetic hermit of the southern Egyptian desert, along the Nile, in the Thebaid, journeys to Alexandria to find Thais, the libertine beauty whom he knew as a youth. Masquerading as a dandy, he is able to speak with her about eternity; surprisingly he succeeds in converting her to Christianity. Yet on their return to the desert he becomes fascinated with her former life. She enters a convent to repent of her sins. He cannot forget the pull of her famous beauty, and becomes confused about the values of life. Later, as she is dying and can only see heaven opening before her, he comes to her side and tells her that her faith is an illusion, and that he loves her.

== English translations ==
- Ernest Tristan (stated 1902 in frontispiece, but likely later, Boni and Liveright. Introduction, with illustrations, by Hendrik Van Loon, likely setting publication after ca 1910)
- Robert Bruce Douglas (1926)

== Adaptations ==
The novel was adapted in 1917 for an American silent film, Thais. In 1984 new adaptation took place for a Polish film Thais directed by Ryszard Ber.

David Frischmann adapted the novel into a short story in Hebrew, called "Ir Hamiklat" ("City of Shelter). He also translated the novel into Hebrew.

The Indian writer Munshi Premchand adapted Thaïs as Ahankar in Hindi.

The comic poet Newman Levy reviewed and summarized the story in his poem "Wicked Alexandria" in response to seeing the Massenet opera. The poem was subsequently popularized as a comic song.
