= The Rough House =

1917 film

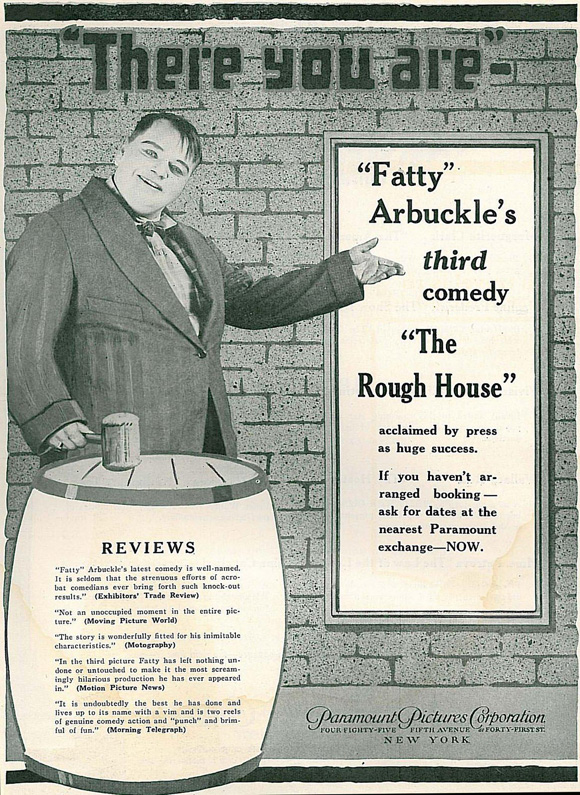
- Poster to The Rough House
- Directed by: Roscoe Arbuckle; Buster Keaton
- Written by: Roscoe Arbuckle; Buster Keaton; Joseph Anthony Roach
- Starring: Roscoe Arbuckle; Buster Keaton
- Cinematography: Frank D. Williams
- Edited by: Herbert Warren
- Production company: Famous Players–Lasky Corporation
- Distributed by: Paramount Pictures
- Release date: June 25, 1917
- Running time: 22 minutes
- Country: United States
- Languages: Silent; English intertitles

The Rough House is a 1917 American two-reel silent comedy film written by, directed by, and starring both Roscoe "Fatty" Arbuckle and Buster Keaton. The Rough House was Keaton's first film as a director.

== Plot ==
The Rough House (1917)

Mr. Rough falls asleep while smoking and wakes up to find his bed on fire. He calmly walks out of his bedroom, through the dining room, and into the kitchen. He gets a single cup of water, returns to the bedroom, and throws it on the fire. He repeats this several times; meanwhile, he drinks some of the water, flirts with the maid in the kitchen, and stops to eat an apple in the dining room. Mrs. Rough and her mother discover the fire and insist on more effective methods, so Rough obtains a garden hose from a gardener. After initially squirting everything but the fire, Rough finally succeeds in putting it out.

A delivery boy arrives. He and the cook get into a fight over the affections of the maid and chase each other all over the house until Rough throws them out. A passing policeman arrests them and takes them to the police station, where the officer in charge gives them a choice: join the force or go to jail.

The Roughs are expecting dinner guests. Lacking the cook, Rough must prepare the dinner. Some of his techniques are creative (e.g., slicing potatoes by putting them through a fan), but others prove disastrous (e.g., serving soup with a sponge). When he finds he is out of rum, he pours gasoline on the steak instead. He brings it to the table and sets fire to it, which completely spoils the dinner and embarrasses his wife and mother-in-law.

The two dinner guests appear to be distinguished, but actually they are thieves in disguise. In the chaos, they sneak away and steal one of Mrs. Rough's necklaces.

Luckily, a plainclothes officer has been tailing them. He telephones the station; the former delivery boy and cook respond. They run to the house, falling down slopes and, in the delivery boy's case, getting stuck on a fence. Meanwhile, the plainclothes officer and Rough, both armed and firing wildly, chase the thieves around the house. Once the newly minted policemen arrive, they arrest the thieves and Mr Rough recovers the necklace.

== Cast ==
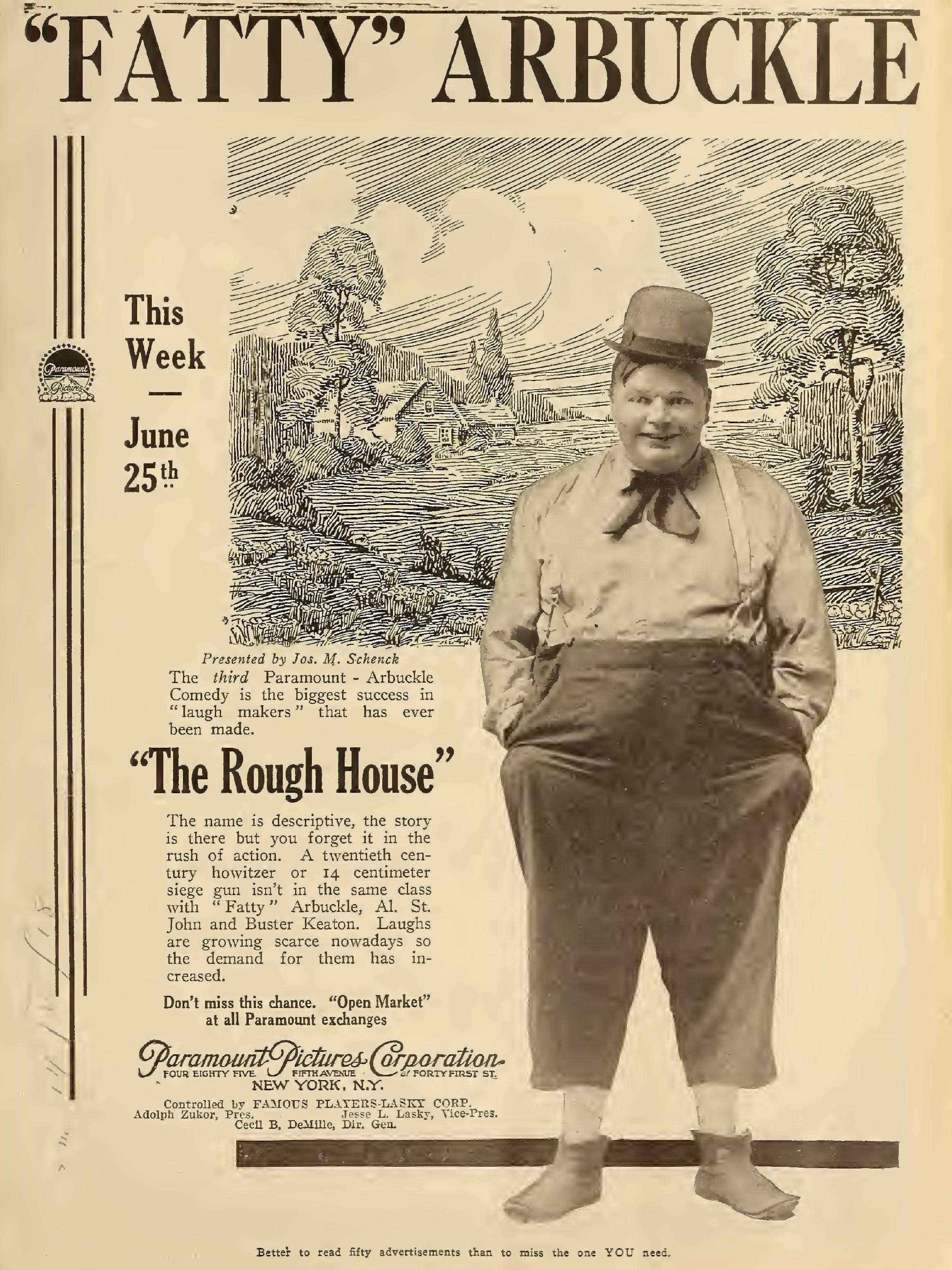
Ad in Motion Picture News, 1917

- Roscoe "Fatty" Arbuckle as Mr Rough
- Buster Keaton as Gardener / Delivery Boy / Cop
- Al St. John as Cook
- Alice Lake as Mrs Rough
- Agnes Neilson as Mother-in-Law
- Josephine Stevens as Maid
- Glen Cavender

== Reception ==
Like many American films of the time, The Rough House was subject to cuts by city and state film censorship boards. The Chicago Board of Censors cut the scene showing the theft of beads from the film.

== Preservation ==
A 35 mm print is held by George Eastman House.

== See also ==
- Fatty Arbuckle filmography
- Buster Keaton filmography
