= All Aboard (1917 film) =

1917 film

- Full film
- Directed by: Alfred J. Goulding
- Written by: H. M. Walker
- Produced by: Hal Roach
- Starring: Harold Lloyd
- Cinematography: Walter Lundin
- Release date: November 25, 1917
- Running time: 9 minutes
- Country: United States
- Language: Silent (English intertitles)

All Aboard is a 1917 American short comedy film starring Harold Lloyd.

== Plot ==
A father takes his daughter on a trip to Bermuda in an attempt to separate her from a suitor. Little does anyone know that the suitor has stowed away on board. When he is discovered, he is credited with catching a crook. The hapless hero receives a reward, and also the girl.

== Cast ==
- Harold Lloyd as The Boy
- Snub Pollard as Passenger with Trunk
- Bebe Daniels as The Girl
- Gus Leonard as The Girl's Father
- Charles Stevenson (as C.E. Stevens) - The Baggage Agent
- Sammy Brooks as Midget Crew Member
- W.L. Adams
- Virginia Baynes
- William Blaisdell
- Clara Dray
- Loretta Dray
- Billy Fay (credited as William Fay)
- Mabel Gibson
- Oscar Larson
- Chris Lynton
- M.J. McCarthy
- Susan Miller
- Belle Mitchell
- Marie Mosquini
- Fred C. Newmeyer (credited as Fred Newmeyer)
- Hazel Powell
- Nina Speight
- William Strohbach (credited as William Strawback)
- Lillian Sylvester
- Dorothea Wolbert (credited as Dorothy Wolbert)

== Reception ==
Like many American films of the time, All Aboard was subject to cuts by city and state film censorship boards. For example, the Chicago Board of Censors required the cut of the scene with the woman rolling on the man and of the woman in hallway with her nightgown raised, exposing her legs.
