= Arnaldo Ginna =

Italian painter

Arnaldo Ginna, also known as Arnaldo Ginanni Corradini, was an Italian painter, sculptor and filmmaker. He was born in Ravenna, 7 May 1890; he died in Rome, 26 September 1982.

== Biography ==
The son of Count Tullio Ginanni Corradini (who was also mayor of Ravenna) and brother of Bruno Corra (Ginna and Corra names were suggested by Giacomo Balla by assonance with the words gym and run), studied at the Academy of Fine Arts in Ravenna, and graduated in Florence.

He focused on the occult sciences, theosophy and Eastern philosophies. In 1910 he published a book with his brother entitled Method and New Life. He theorized about a future non-figurative painting with chromatic music, i.e. translation of feelings and moods in sound and color.

An important moment in his artistic research was the early meeting with the Futurist group. This occurred in Milan, in the house of Tommaso Marinetti. This Futurist group included Boccioni, Carrà and Russolo. Unlike that group, which was interested in the dynamic aspect of painting, he developed a propensity to a painting of pure color, with strong spiritualistic inflections. Between 1910 and 1912 he worked with Corra on some short abstract films, using the color directly on the untreated film. These cinepitture, consisting of overlapping colorful dots, were a commentary on the musical works of Mendelssohn symphonies and abstract compositions to avant-garde.

He participated in the Exhibition of Painting and Sculpture in 1912 at the company's Belle Arti in Florence, showing the works Neurasthenia (1908) and Romantic walk (1909). In April 1914, he participated in the Free Futurist International Exhibition, held at the Galleria Sprovieri in Rome. In 1915 he published the text painting of the future and with Corra, the synthesis theatrical Alternation of character in the Futurist Synthetic Theatre of Marinetti, Corra and Settimelli. Up residence in Florence, in addition to true artistic, tried her hand in both theoretical writing treatises on the costume and the occult, political texts and narrative. In 1916 he produced and directed the film Futurist Life, in collaboration with Corra, Balla and Marinetti. However, there now exist only a few frames of this film.

In 1919 he published the presurrealista The locomotives with stockings, with a preface by Corra and designs proprietary and pink rose. In the same year he participated in the Great National Exhibition of Futurist Milan, Genoa and Florence. From 1918 to 1920 he collaborated with the magazine Futurist Rome. In the 1920s and 1930s he collaborated with Empire and with Today and Tomorrow. In 1927 he directed the magazine of natural medicine The New. Later he collaborated with the magazine Futurism of Somenzi, which was published in his book pointing Man future. In 1937 he published The idea presentista. In 1938 he signed the manifesto with Marinetti Cinematography.

When the futurist period ended, he continued to paint in his abstract genre-occultist, continuing to devote himself to painting until the 1960s. He also collaborated in numerous publications as an art critic and film.
