= Thais (1917 American film) =

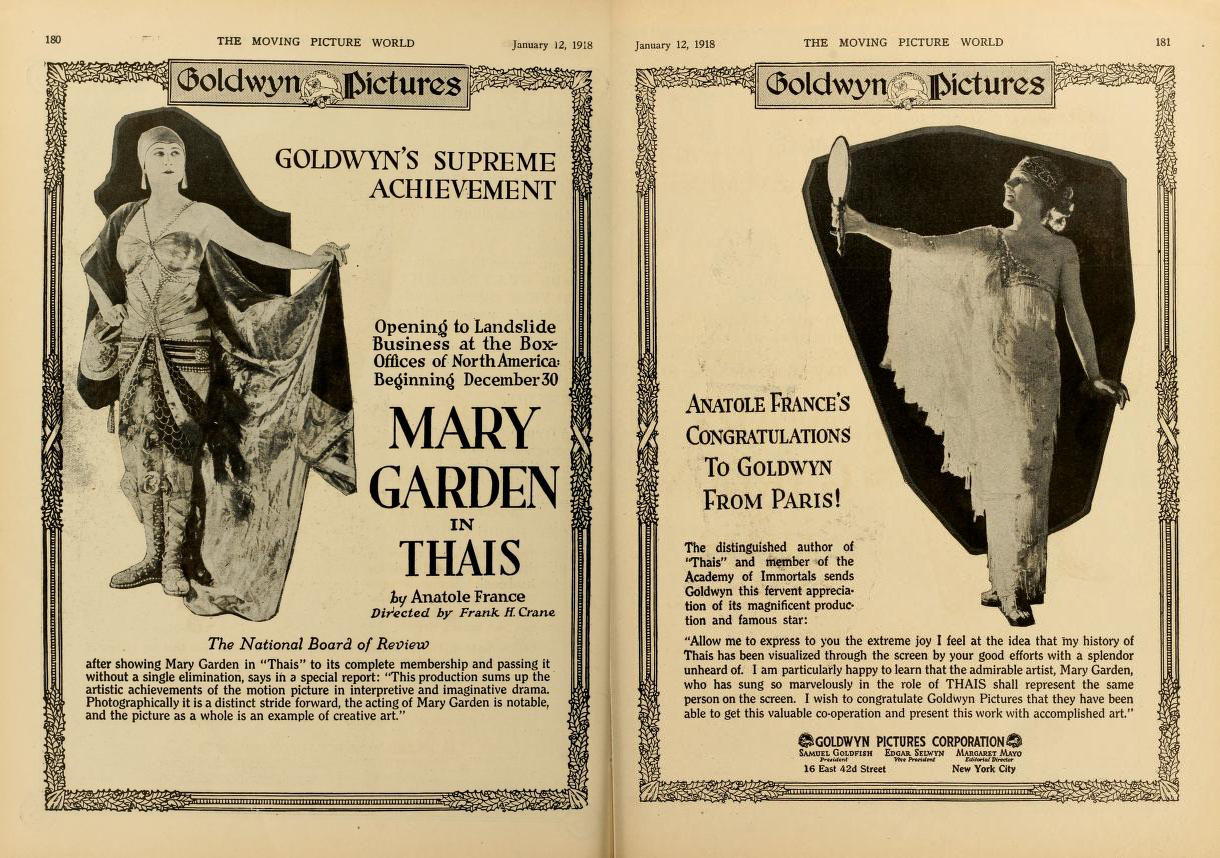
- Advertisement
- Directed by: Hugo Ballin; Frank Hall Crane
- Written by: Edfrid A. Bingham (scenario)
- Based on: Thaïs by Anatole France
- Produced by: Samuel Goldwyn
- Starring: Mary Garden
- Cinematography: David Abel
- Music by: Jules Massenet
- Distributed by: Goldwyn Pictures
- Release date: December 30, 1917
- Running time: 7 reels
- Country: United States
- Language: Silent (English intertitles)

Thais is a 1917 American silent drama film produced by Samuel Goldwyn, and based on the 1890 novel Thaïs by Anatole France. This film featured opera prima donna Mary Garden, making her film debut at the then-lavish weekly salary of US$15,000. Other cast members include Lionel Adams, Crauford Kent, and Charles Trowbridge. This film is considered "one of the most colossal flops in movie history, both artistically and financially".

== Plot ==
As described in a film magazine, Thais, a lustful dancer, tries to get Paphnutius under her power, but since he is a Christian he leaves to become a monk. Later, he returns to reclaim her soul and convinces the petted, spoiled, and lustrous Thais to cast off her riches, luxuries, and friends and to follow in his footsteps. Attempting to live solitary lives, the tortuous remembrance of their past lives causes them to forget everything and rush out into the desert. Thais is rescued by some sisters who take her to a nunnery. Paphnutius, unable to conquer his love for Thais, rushes to the nunnery only to find Thais dying the death of a saint. Her saintliness brings him a realization of his wrongs, and the film ends with his begging forgiveness for bowing to temptation and the strength to continue his work.

== Cast ==
- Mary Garden as Thais
- Hamilton Revelle as Paphnutius
- Crauford Kent as Lollius
- Lionel Adams as Cynius
- Alice Chapin as Mother Superior
- Margaret Townsend as Nun
- Charles Trowbridge as Nicius

== Reception ==
Like many American films of the time, Thais was subject to cuts by city and state film censorship boards. The Chicago Board of Censors required, in Reel 1, a shortening of the scene on stone bench where Thais embraces man, Reel 2, cut stabbing of man, Reel 3, the intertitle "To rid this city of this courtesan", Reel 4, the intertitle "Your life is a life misspent. Your body a thing impure", closeup of dancer on pedestal, closeup of intoxicated couple on couch, the intertitle "And with the morning the feast became a revel unashamed" and flash the orgy scene following, scene of two young women with man on couch prior to intertitle "Lust", all scenes of intoxicated men and women in closeup views, the intertitle "Look, Thais has a monk for a lover", suicide of man, two scenes of drunken couple staggering down banquet hall, Reel 5, stabbing Nicius, and scene of Thais in desert where her figure shows through the draperies.

== Preservation ==
The film is preserved in three film archives, the George Eastman House Motion Picture Collection, Museum of Modern Art, and BFI National Archive.

== See also ==
- Thaïs (opera)
- A monochrome copy of the Thais movie poster, a number of production still photos, and a detailed description of the production are available in a 2011 book published by David W Menefee.
