= Riccardo Cassano (director) =

Italian film director

- Born: 27 June 1885; Naples, Kingdom of Italy
- Died: 16 November 1953 (aged 68); Rome, Italy
- Occupation: Film director
- Years active: 1915-1946

Riccardo Cassano (27 June 1885 - 16 November 1953) was an Italian film director. He directed in more than ten films from 1915 to 1946.

== Selected filmography ==
Year	Title	Notes
1933	Quando eravamo muti	
1921	La mosca d'oro	
1921	My Uncle Barbassous	
