= Anton Giulio Bragaglia =

Italian photographer, filmmaker and writer (1890–1960)

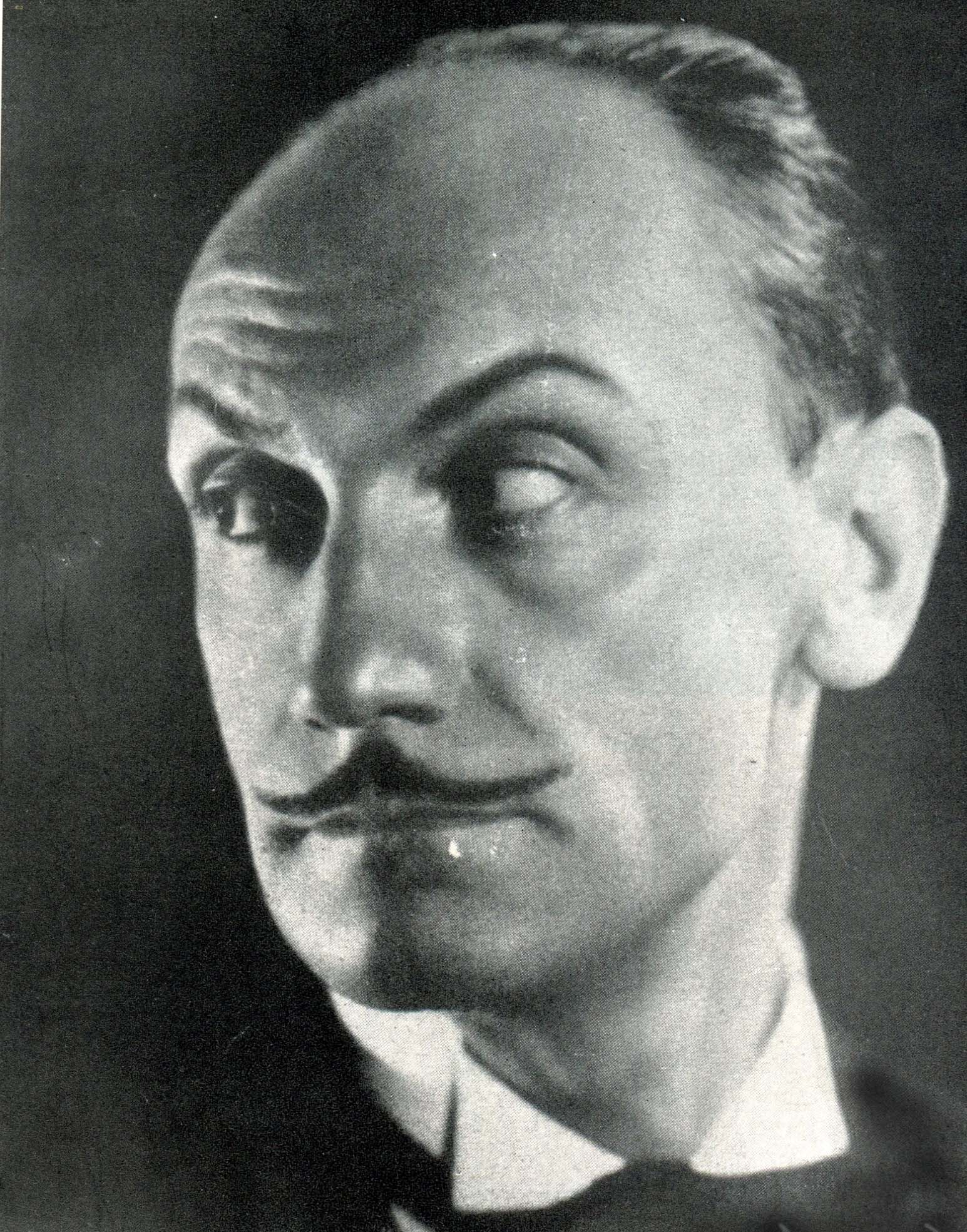
- Bragaglia in 1918
- Born: 11 February 1890; Frosinone, Lazio, Kingdom of Italy
- Died: 15 July 1960 (aged 70); Rome, Italy
- Known for: Cinematography; Photography; Theatre
- Notable work: Thais
- Movement: Futurism
- Relatives: Carlo Ludovico Bragaglia (brother); Arturo Bragaglia (brother)

Signature
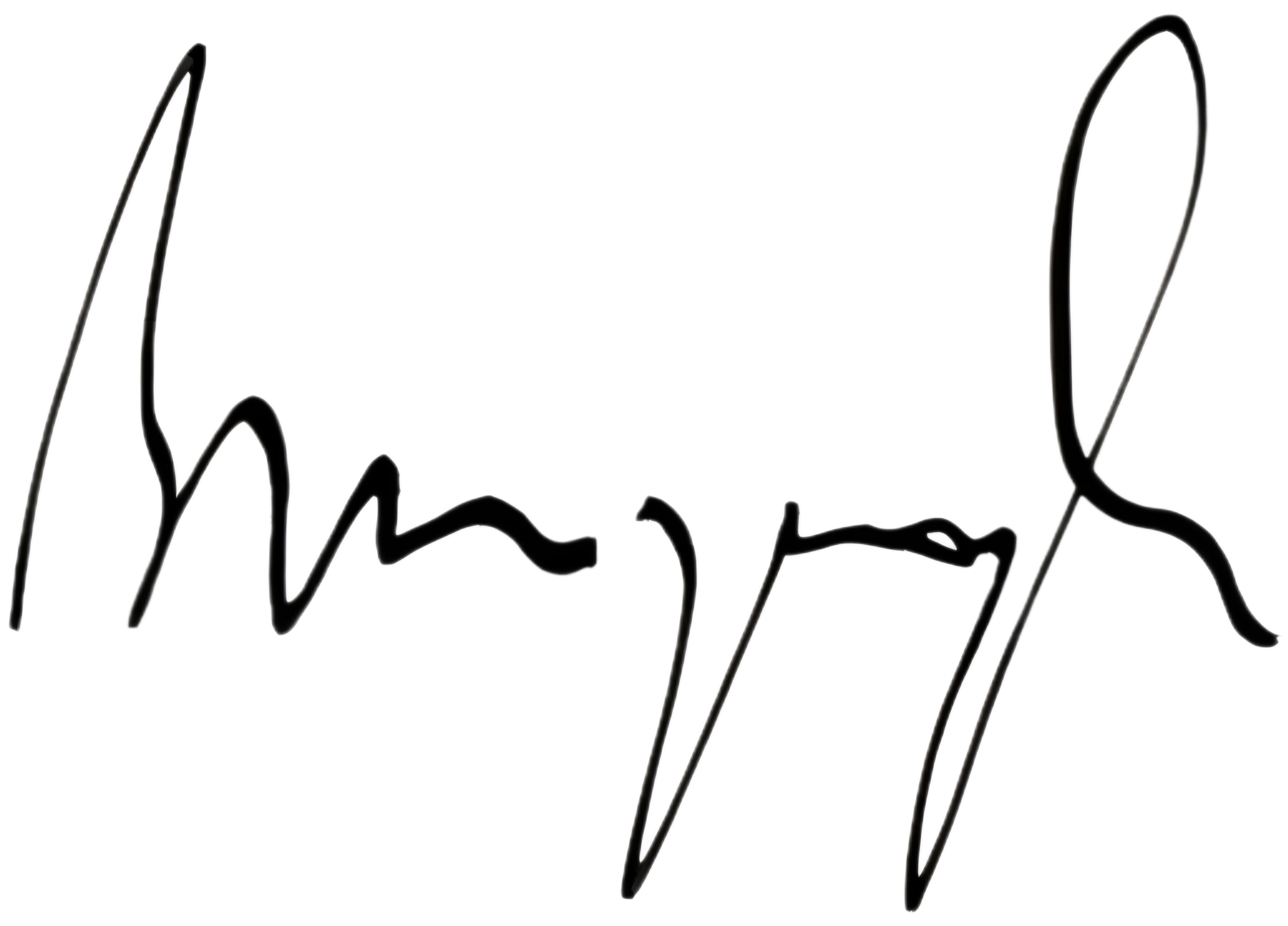

Anton Giulio Bragaglia (11 February 1890 – 15 July 1960) was a pioneer in Italian Futurist photography and Futurist cinema. A versatile and intellectual artist with wide interests, he wrote about film, theatre, and dance.

== Early life ==
Bragaglia was born in Frosinone, Lazio. His brothers were actor Arturo Bragaglia and film director Carlo Ludovico Bragaglia. In 1906 Bragaglia went to work as an assistant director of a Roman movie studio managed by his father Francesco. He gained a great deal of technical and artistic experience there, learning from directors Mario Caserini and Enrico Guazzoni. His younger siblings Arturo (actor) and Carlo Ludovico (film director) were both involved in Italian cinema from the 1930s to mid-1960s.

== Futurism ==
In 1911 he published the treatise Fotodinamismo and began lecturing on the concept. In the same year he became the chief editor of the art and theater newspaper "L'Artista". He published two Futurist manifestos, Fotodinamica Futurista (1912) and Manifesto of Futurist Cinema (1916). In 1916 he founded the avant garde magazine Cronache di Attualità, which examined politics, music, theater and art from a Futurist standpoint. In the same year he founded the film studio "Novissima-Film", and produced some visionary Futurist films including Thais, Perfido incanto, and Il mio cadavere.

In 1918 he opened an art gallery, the "Casa d'Arte Bragaglia", which became a nexus of avant garde artists and exhibitions. It displayed the work of such modernists as Balla, Depero, De Chirico, Boccioni, Klimt and Kandinsky. In 1919 he directed plays by Rosso di San Secondo and Pirandello.

From 1921 to 1924 Bragaglia published the satirical pamphlet Index Rerum Virorumque Prohibitorum ("Index of Forbidden Things and Men"). In 1922 he opened the "Teatro Sperimentale degli Indipendenti" which he directed till 1936. The same year he founded his own theater company ("Company Bragaglia Shows"), which also became a focal point for the Italian avant garde. In 1932, he was named advisor to the Corporazione dello Spettacolo (Entertainment Guild). The Teatro closed in 1936, and from 1937 to 1943 he was director of the foundation "Teatro delle Arti".

Bragaglia described his theories on the theater in Maschera mobile (1926), Del teatro teatrale ossia del teatro (1927), and Il segreto di Tabarrino (1933). He directed more than fifty productions. From 1926 until 1960, he also wrote a number of articles and books about art, the theater and motion pictures.

Bragaglia died in Rome on 15 July 1960.

== Selected filmography ==
=== Silent films ===
Year	Title	Preservation status
1917	Thais	Cinémathèque française
1917	Il mio cadavere	Lost
1917	Un dramma nell'Olimpo	Lost
1918	Perfido incanto	Lost

Sound films

Year	Title	Notes
1931	Lowered Sails	
1950	Cosenza tirrenica	Documentary
1950	Floridiana	Documentary

== Bibliography ==
- Lista, Giovanni (1979). Futurismo e fotografia. Milan: Edizioni Multhipla.
- Photographie futuriste italienne (1911–1939), exposition organisée par Giovanni Lista, Musée d’Art Moderne, 29 October 1981 – 3 January 1982, Paris.
- Lista, Giovanni (2001). Futurism and Photography. London: Merrell Publishers.
- Lista, Giovanni (2008). Cinéma et photographie futuriste. Paris: Skira-Flammarion Éditeur. ISBN 978-2081218284.
- Il Futurismo nella fotografia, exposition organisée par Giovanni Lista, Museo Nazionale Alinari della Fotografia, 17 September-15 November 2009, Florence – Edizioni Alinari, Florence, 2009.
