= A Romance of the Redwoods =

1917 film

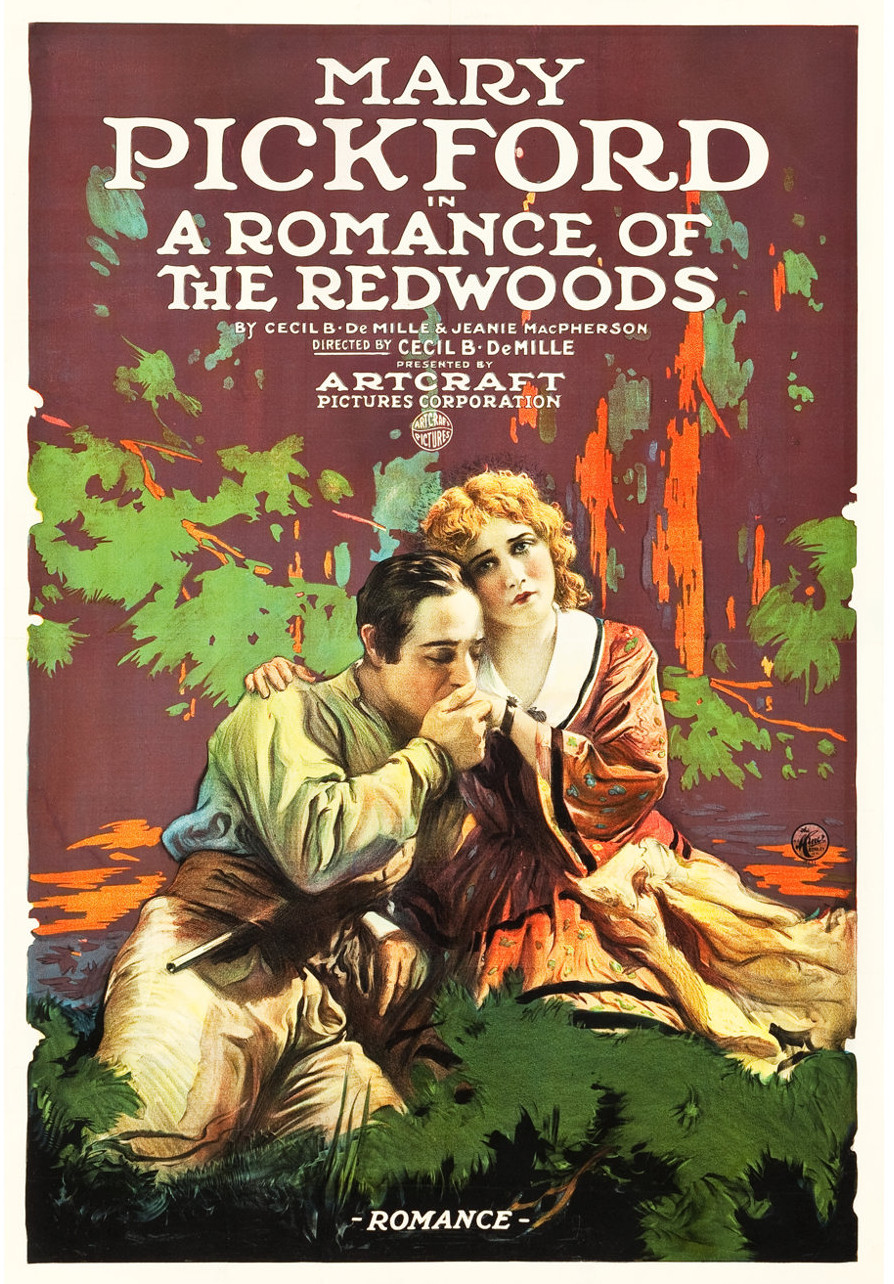
- Film poster
- Directed by: Cecil B. DeMille; Cullen Tate (asst. director)
- Written by: Cecil B. DeMille; Jeanie MacPherson
- Produced by: Cecil B. DeMille
- Starring: Mary Pickford
- Cinematography: Alvin Wyckoff
- Edited by: Cecil B. DeMille
- Production company: Famous Players–Lasky/Artcraft
- Distributed by: Paramount Pictures
- Release date: May 14, 1917
- Running time: 70 minutes
- Country: United States
- Language: Silent (English intertitles)
- Budget: $134,831
- Box office: 424,718

A Romance Of The Redwoods (1917)

A Romance of the Redwoods is a 1917 American silent drama film directed by Cecil B. DeMille and starring Mary Pickford.

Art direction for the film was done by Wilfred Buckland. Location shooting for the film took place in the redwood country in California.

== Plot ==
Around the table of a New England parlor are seated friends of the Widow Lawrence. What to do with Jenny, the only child, is the topic of the conversation. Several offer to take the little girl to live with them, when the lawyer announces that the last wish of her mother was that she be sent to her uncle John Lawrence, who left for the California gold mines two months previous. The idea appeals to Jenny and thus, during the big gold rush of '49, she leaves for California to live with her uncle. John Lawrence, the uncle, has been killed by Indians and his body is found by "Black" Brown, a road agent who is being pursued by the sheriff's posse. Substituting the clothes and papers of the dead man for his own, the bandit passes as a wealthy man from Boston and lives in the little mining camp of "Strawberry Flats." In secret, however, he still plies his outlaw trade on stagecoaches and pack trains. Jenny arrives at the cabin of "John Lawrence" and begins to straighten things out. From her bag, she takes a pair of carpet slippers which she embroidered and with a little card places them on the mantel to surprise her uncle. When Jack, as the impostor is known, enters, Jenny asks the whereabouts of her uncle. With an evil leer, the bandit advises her that he is her "uncle," and tells her of her uncle's death. Later in order to protect herself from the hands of a ruffian, Jenny is compelled to establish herself as the niece of Jack. At the cabin, Jack finds the slippers and the card, "With love, from Jenny." He begins to realize the sincerity of the little girl. Jenny refuses to sleep in the house and is put to bed in the horse shed and the next morning makes the best of things.

Taking complete charge of the house, she prepares for Jack the first good breakfast he has had for some time and a warm friendship springs up between the two. One morning, while cleaning up the cabin, Jenny finds a handkerchief in which are cut two eye holes and suddenly realizes what this man really does. In the meantime, one of the miners is robbed while taking a load of gold to the depot to be shipped home. In rage, his partner rushes to the saloon to kill the sheriff for not giving the gold proper guard but the sheriff draws first and the miner Dick Roland drops with a bullet through his heart. Jenny connects the robbery with the handkerchief, picks up the letter from his mother to the murdered miner and goes to her cabin where she prepares to leave immediately.

Jack enters with a new dress, bonnet and doll for Jenny but the latter refuses them and shows the letter of the dead boy to his mother, together with the bandit mask she discovered. Jack acknowledges his guilt but vows his love for her. Jenny promises to stay if he will send the gold to the boy's mother and live "straight," which Jack agrees to do.

Later, Jack becomes discouraged with his lack of success as a miner and determines to "turn one more trick." He holds up the stagecoach in which unknown to him Jenny is riding with Jim Lyn, her date for a country picnic at Indian Bar. Drawing a little derringer, she shoots at the outlaw, wounding his right hand, just then recognizing her “uncle” but she doesn't betray him. Back at the cabin, at first, Jack lies and says it's his gold dust from panning but his wounded hand clearly marks him a thief. He pleads with Jenny that he could not let her support him with the washing which she had been doing for the miners, but Jenny is not won over.

At this point, a knock comes at the door and the Midnight Vigilance Committee enters. Jenny quickly throws her shawl over the gold sack and there is a battle of wits. Jack is finally cornered, however, and his immediate execution is arranged despite the heart-rending pleadings of Jenny. Just as her sweetheart is about to be hanged from the cabin rafters, Jenny returns to the room with a little white dress, which she has secretly taken from the doll, and the apparent significance of the situation dawns upon the men, who are very fond of her. They agree to give Jack his freedom if he marries the girl at once, and a justice of the peace performs the ceremony immediately.

Just after the newly married couple have left the cabin to find their future, the men find the half-naked doll and they realize they have been tricked. Several grip their guns and are about to start after the couple, when Jim Lyn, the leader, who was especially sweet on Jenny, orders the men back, saying, "Boys, I reckon when 20 men have been fooled by one woman, they better take their medicine."

== Cast ==
- Mary Pickford as Jenny Lawrence
- Elliott Dexter as "Black" Brown, Road Agent
- Tully Marshall as Sam Sparks
- Raymond Hatton as Dick Roland
- Charles Ogle as Jim Lyn
- Walter Long as Sheriff
- Winter Hall as John Lawrence, Uncle To Jenny

== Production ==
Mary Pickford was paid $90,000.

== Preservation ==
A complete 35 mm print of A Romance of the Redwoods is held by the George Eastman Museum in Rochester, New York.

== See also ==
- Mary Pickford filmography
