= List of Italian films of 1924 =

A list of films produced in Italy in 1924 (see 1924 in film):

Title	Director	Cast	Genre	Notes
1924
A Marechiare 'nce sta 'na fenestra				
Amore in agguato				
L' Arzigigolo				
'Nfama!				
Cavalleria rusticana	Mario Gargiulo	Livio Pavanelli, Mary Cleo Tarlarini	Drama	
Chief Saetta	Eugenio Perego	Domenico Gambino, Pauline Polaire	Adventure	
Largo alle donne!	Guido Brignone	Oreste Bilancia, Alberto Pasquali	Comedy	
Emperor Maciste	Guido Brignone	Bartolomeo Pagano, Elena Sangro	Adventure	
The House of Pulcini	Mario Camerini	Diomira Jacobini, Amleto Novelli	Drama	
Latest Night News	Emilio Ghione	Emilio Ghione, Kally Sambucini	Action	
Maciste's American Nephew	Eleuterio Rodolfi	Bartolomeo Pagano, Diomira Jacobini	Adventure	
Messalina	Enrico Guazzoni	Rina De Liguoro, Calisto Bertramo	Historical	
Pleasure Train	Luciano Doria	Oreste Bilancia, Pauline Polaire	Silent	
Quo Vadis	Gabriellino D'Annunzio, Georg Jacoby	Emil Jannings, Elena Sangro, Lillian Hall-Davis	Historical Epic	
Vedi Napoli e poi muori	Eugenio Perego	Leda Gys, Livio Pavanelli	Drama	
Za La Mort	Emilio Ghione	Fern Andra, Emilio Ghione, Magnus Stifter	Action	Co-production with Germany

== See also ==
- List of Italian films of 1923
- List of Italian films of 1925
