= List of Italian films of 1922 =

A list of films produced in Italy in 1922 (see 1922 in film):

Title	Director	Cast	Genre	Notes
1922
'A Santanotte				
Al confine della morte				
Anadiomene				
La Belle Madame Hebért				
Cainà	Gennaro Righelli	Maria Jacobini, Carlo Benetti, Ida Carloni Talli	Drama	
Nero	J. Gordon Edwards	Jacques Grétillat, Sandro Salvini, Nerio Bernardi	Historical	Co-production with the United States
Ê piccirella	Elvira Notari	Eduardo Notari, Rosè Angione, Alberto Danza, Elisa Cava		
Under the Snow	Gennaro Righelli	Maria Jacobini, Alberto Capozzi, Ignazio Lupi	Drama	
