= List of Italian films of 1921 =

A list of films produced in Italy in 1921 (see 1921 in film):

Title	Director	Cast	Genre	Notes
1921
A Mosca cieca				
Addio Musetto				
Al chiaror dei lampi				
Alba di sangue				
Maciste on Vacation	Luigi Romano Borgnetto	Bartolomeo Pagano, Henriette Bonard, Felice Minotti	Adventure	
The Mechanical Man	André Deed	Giulia Costa, Andre Deed	Science fiction	
The Painting of Osvaldo Mars	Guido Brignone	Mercedes Brignone, Domenico Serra, Giovanni Cimara	Drama	
Red Love	Gennaro Righelli	Maria Jacobini, Amleto Novelli, Arnold Kent	Drama	
The Revenge of Maciste	Luigi Romano Borgnetto	Bartolomeo Pagano, Henriette Bonard, Felice Minotti	Adventure	
The Ship	Gabriellino D'Annunzio, Mario Roncoroni	Ida Rubinstein, Alfredo Boccolini, Ciro Galvani	Historical	
The Voyage	Gennaro Righelli	Maria Jacobini, Carlo Benetti	Drama	
