= The Prey (1921 film) =

1921 film

- Directed by: Guglielmo Zorzi
- Written by: Camille de Morlhon
- Starring: Carmen Boni
- Production company: Fert Film
- Distributed by: Fert Film
- Release date: July 1921
- Countries: France; Italy
- Languages: Silent; Italian intertitles

The Prey (Italian: La preda) is a 1921 French-Italian silent film directed by Guglielmo Zorzi.

== Cast ==
- Maria Jacobini
- Amleto Novelli
- Alfonso Cassini
- Carmen Boni
- Ida Carloni Talli
- Mara Cassano]
- Arnold Kent
- Renato Visca

== Bibliography ==
- Stewart, John. Italian film: a who's who. McFarland, 1994.
