= The Rose of Granada =

1916 film by Emilio Ghione

- Directed by: Emilio Ghione
- Written by: Emilio Ghione
- Starring: Lina Cavalieri
- Production company: Tiber-film
- Distributed by: Tiber-film
- Release date: November 1916
- Country: Italy
- Languages: Silent; Italian intertitles

The Rose of Granada (Italian:La rosa di Granata) is a 1916 Italian silent film directed by Emilio Ghione and starring Ida Carloni Talli, Lina Cavalieri and Diomira Jacobini.

This film may have been rereleased in 1919 as The House of Granada by Paramount.

== Cast ==
- Ida Carloni Talli
- Lina Cavalieri
- Diomira Jacobini
- Ignazio Lupi
- Lucien Muratore
- Claudio Nicola
- Kally Sambucini

== Bibliography ==
- Paul Fryer, Olga Usova. Lina Cavalieri: The Life of Opera's Greatest Beauty, 1874-1944. McFarland, 2003.
