= Pauline Polaire =

Italian actress (1904–1986)

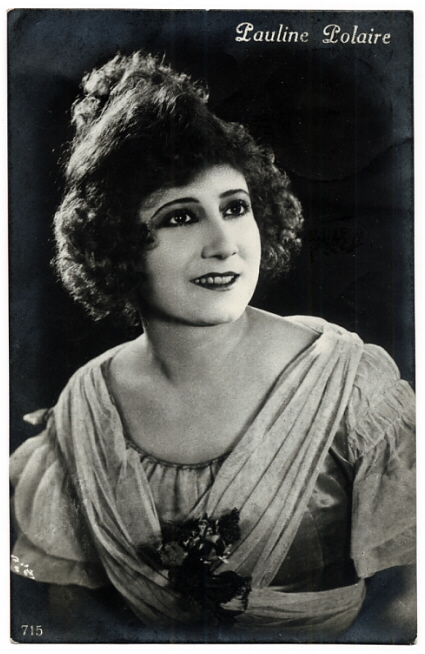
- Pauline Polaire in a publicity for the 1925 film Maciste all'inferno
- Born: Giulietta Gozzi; June 30, 1904; Ravenna
- Died: February 11, 1986 (aged 81); Rome
- Occupation: actress

Pauline Polaire (stage name of Giulietta Gozzi) was an Italian actress.

Giuletta Gozzi was born in Ravenna, Italy, on 30 June 1904. She was the niece of the Italian actress Hesperia, née Olga Mambelli. She died in Rome on 11 February 1986.

The similarity of her name with that of French actress Polaire has given rise to some confusion in their filmographies in sites specialized in cinema.

== Filmography ==
- 1918 : Leggerezza e castigo, by Gero Zambuto
- 1920 : L'istinto, by Baldassarre Negroni
- 1920 : Germoglio, by Torello Rolli
- 1920 : La farina del diavolo, by Luigi Romano Borgnetto
- 1920 : L'altro pericolo, by Baldassarre Negroni
- 1921 : Il figlio di Madame Sans Gêne, by Baldassarre Negroni
- 1921 : Un punto nero, by Augusto Genina
- 1922 : La duchessa Mistero, by Baldassarre Negroni
- 1922 : Il controllore dei vagoni letto, by Mario Almirante
- 1923 : L'ora terribile, by Baldassarre Negroni
- 1923 : La locanda delle ombre, by Baldassarre Negroni and Ivo Illuminati
- 1923 : Un viaggio nell'impossibile, by Luciano Doria and Nunzio Malasomma
- 1923 : Il capolavoro di Saetta, by Eugenio Perego
- 1923 : Saetta contro la ghigliottina, by Émile Vardannes
- 1923 : Le vie del mare, by Torello Rolli
- 1924 : Treno di piacere, by Luciano Doria
- 1924 : La taverna verde, by Luciano Doria
- 1924 : Saetta impara a vivere, by Guido Brignone
- 1924 : Maciste e il nipote d'America, by Eleuterio Rodolfi
- 1924 : Caporal Saetta, by Eugenio Perego
- 1925 : Maciste all'inferno by Guido Brignone : Graziella
