= The Closed Mouth =

1925 film

- Directed by: Guglielmo Zorzi
- Written by: Guglielmo Zorzi
- Cinematography: Cesare Cavagna
- Production company: S.A.I.C.
- Distributed by: Societa Anonima Stefano Pittaluga
- Release date: 27 October 1925
- Country: Italy
- Languages: Silent; Italian intertitles

The Closed Mouth (Italian: La bocca chiusa) is a 1925 Italian silent film directed by Guglielmo Zorzi.

== Cast ==
- Maria Jacobini as Maria
- Arnold Kent as Lord Colchester, padre e figlio
- Carlo Benetti as Marchese di Castelfino
- Carmen Boni as Jolanda
- Augusto Poggioli as Il padrigo di Maria
- Pina Marini
- Marcella Sabbatini

== Bibliography ==
- Vacche, Angela Dalle. Diva: Defiance and Passion in Early Italian Cinema. University of Texas Press, 2008.
