= Ivo Illuminati =

Italian film director, screenwriter (1882–1963)

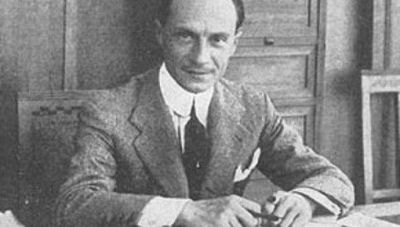
- Ivo Illuminati
- Born: 11 June 1882; Ripatransone, Italy
- Died: 6 September 1963 (aged 81); Rome, Italy
- Occupation(s): Film director screenwriter actor

Ivo Illuminati (11 June 1882 – 6 September 1963) was an Italian film director, actor and screenwriter and a pioneer of the Italian silent movie.

== Life and career ==
In 1887 he moved with his parents and two brothers from his native Ripatransone to Rome, where his father worked as a state civil servant. There Illuminati met personnel of Auguste and Louis Lumière, who imported the new techniques of the cinema from France and taught them to young people. He became a pupil of Gaston Velle, director of the production company Cines and learned how to use the movie camera.

Between 1902 and 1913 he made many short films of 2 to 5 minutes duration, in which many Italian actors made their debut, e.g., Hesperia, Leda Gys, Diomira Jacobini, Maria Jacobini, Fulvia Perini, and Elvira Radaelli. Illumnati himself had his first role in Emilio Ghione's Gespay, fantino e gentiluomo in 1914.

In the same year his career as a film director took off with La fanciulla di Capri, Una donna and Mamma perdona. He became an established figure in the Italian movie scene with Leda innamorata, Quando la primavera ritornò, Sotto l'ala della morte, I re, le torri, gli alfieri (1916) and Emir, cavallo da circo (1917). The last two films are considered to be among his best works. In 1917 Illuminati changed his production company from Medusa Film to Silentium Film of Milan, with whom he made La nemica (1917) and Automartirio (1917). However, Illuminati ran into conflicts with a film critic who preferred American imported movies and with the Italian government, which cut 600 meters from his film La vita è fumo (1918). A similar fate hit Tombola (1918, with neorealist leanings) and La stirpe (1918). Tombola convinced a public which in general preferred movies from the United States.

In the 1920s Illuminati's career halted because of the advent of sound movies and the death of his beloved actress Margherita Soave, who starred in Alba rossa (1920). In 1921 he still directed three movies and finally became an assistant-director for Carmine Gallone's Giuseppe Verdi (1938). In 1941 Illuminati directed his last film, Il vetturale del San Gottardo, even if the Italian Ministry of Popular Culture forced the collaboration of the German Hans Hinrich on him.

Forgotten by the public, Ivo Illuminati died at Rome in 1963.

== Restored copies of his movies ==
Most of Illuminati's production is lost, but the Italian Cineteca Nazionale at Rome curates restored copies of Selika (1921) and Vetturale del San Gottardo (1941) which were presented at the Venice Film Festival in 2011. In 2013, Tragico convegno (1915) was discovered at EYE Film Institute Netherlands (although the third reel remained missing) and a restored version with a running time of 34 minutes and with Dutch intertitles was subsequently presented at the Festival del Cinema Ritrovato in Bologna.

== Filmography ==
- La fiamma rossa (1914)
- La viandante (1914)
- Per mia figlia! (1914)
- Tragica confessione (1914)
- La torre dei fantasmi (1914)
- La fanciulla di Capri (1914)
- Una donna (1914)
- Tragico convegno (1915)
- Per salvarlo! (1915)
- Mamma... Perdono! (1915)
- L'oro maledetto (1915)
- Sotto l'ala della morte (1915)
- Per non-morire (1915)
- Leda innamorat (1915)
- I cavalieri moderni (1915)
- Quando la primavera ritornò (1916)
- La maschera dell'amore (1916)
- Dopo la raffica (1916)
- Automartirio (1917)
- Il re, le torri, gli alfieri (1917)
- Emir cavallo da circo (1917)
- La nemica (1917)
- La vita è fumo (1918)
- Margheritella (1918)
- Tombola (1918)
- La stirpe (1918)
- Giflée (1918)
- Eva (1919)
- Miracolo d'amore (1919)
- Papà eccellenza (1919)
- Bruscolo (1919)
- Un segreto nel chiosco (1919)
- Alba rossa (1920)
- Il mistero dell'americano (1920)
- La nemesi danzante (1920)
- Il filtro di Circe (1920)
- Selika (1921)
- La maschera (1921)
- Giovanna la pallida (1921)
- Venite, io vi amo (1921)
- Favilla (1921)
- Come io vi amo (1921)
- La locanda delle ombre (1923)
- L'aria del continente (1935) Screenwriter
- Leggenda azzurra (1940) Screenwriter
- Il vetturale del San Gottardo (1941) Co-director
