= List of Italian films of 1923 =

A list of films produced in Italy in 1923 (see 1923 in film):

Title	Director	Cast	Genre	Notes
1923
A colpi d'ascia				
A morte! Signor ladro				
Abbasso il cambio!				
Ali spezzate				
The Betrothed	Mario Bonnard	Domenico Serra, Nini Dinelli	Drama	
The Cry of the Eagle	Mario Volpe	Gustavo Serena, Dillo Lombardi	Drama	
La dama de Chez Maxim's	Amleto Palermi	Carmen Boni, Alfredo Martinelli	Comedy	

== See also ==
- List of Italian films of 1922
- List of Italian films of 1924
