= The Redemption (1924 film) =

1924 film

- Directed by: Guglielmo Zorzi
- Starring: Carmen Boni
- Production company: Direttori Associati
- Distributed by: Direttori Associati
- Release date: November 1924
- Country: Italy
- Languages: Silent; Italian intertitles

The Redemption (Italian: Il riscatto) is a 1924 Italian silent film directed by Guglielmo Zorzi and starring Carmen Boni.

== Cast ==
- Carmen Boni
- Andrea Habay
- Arnold Kent
- Elena Lunda
- Alfredo Martinelli
- Enrico Scatizzi
- Mary Cleo Tarlarini

== Bibliography ==
- Stewart, John. Italian film: a who's who. McFarland, 1994.
