= Paola Barbara =

Italian film actress (1912–1989)

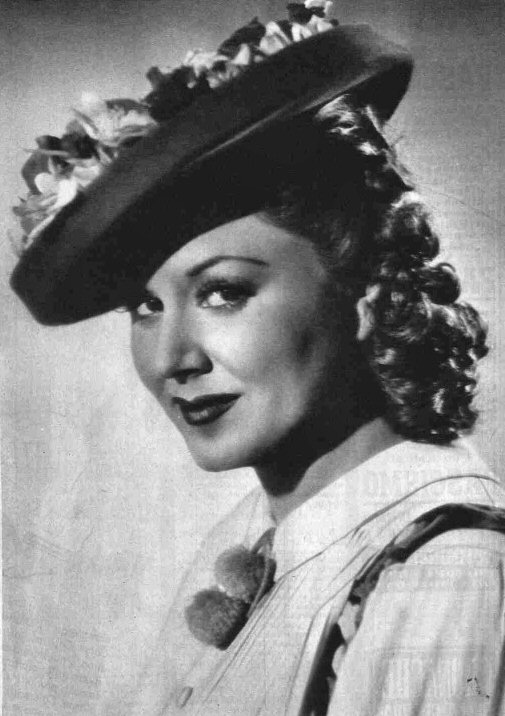
- Born: 22 July 1912; Rome, Kingdom of Italy
- Died: 2 October 1989 (aged 77); Rome, Italy
- Other names: Pauline Baards; Paola Bárbara
- Occupation: Actress
- Years active: 1914–1978

Paola Barbara (22 July 1912 – 2 October 1989) was an Italian film actress. She appeared in more than 60 films between 1935 and 1978. She was sometimes credited as Pauline Baards.

== Life and career ==
Born in Rome as Paola Proto, after her film debut in a small role in Campo di Maggio (1935), in 1936 she produced and had the leading role in White Amazons by Gennaro Righelli; the film had a huge commercial success and launched her career. Barbara was one of the most requested and popular divas in the 1930s Italian cinema industry; in 1941 she met the director Primo Zeglio who later became her husband. In 1943, with the worsening of World War II, Barbara moved in Spain where she starred on several films. After the war she moved back in Italy where she failed to recover her popularity, even keeping on appearing in dozens of films, sometimes directed by her husband, usually in supporting roles.

== Selected filmography ==
- The Ancestor (1936)
- White Amazons (1936)
- These Children (1937)
- For Men Only (1938)
- Pride (1938)
- Battles in the Shadow (1938)
- Triumph of Love (1938)
- We Were Seven Sisters (1939)
- Naples Will Never Die (1939)
- The Hotel of the Absent (1939)
- The Sinner (1940)
- The Hero of Venice (1941)
- The King's Jester (1941)
- Fourth Page (1942)
- Rossini (1942)
- Fever (1943)
- Fantastic Night (1943)
- It Happened in Damascus (1943)
- The Prodigal Woman (1946)
- Public Trial (1946)
- The Captain's Ship (1947)
- Three Mirrors (1947)
- I cavalieri dalle maschere nere (1948)
- Return to Naples (1949)
- The Beggar's Daughter (1950)
- They Were Three Hundred (1952)
- I figli non si vendono (1952)
- La figlia del diavolo (1952)
- Nero and the Burning of Rome (1953)
- Cavallina storna (1953)
- Captain Phantom (1953)
- Il coraggio (1955)
- The Seven Revenges (1961)
- The Sign of the Coyote (1963)
- Cavalca e uccidi (1964)
- The Relentless Four (1965)
- Killer Adios (1968)
- The Appointment (1969)
- A Man Called Sledge (1970)
- La banda de los tres crisantemos (1970)
