= The Opium Den =

1947 film by Raffaello Matarazzo

- Directed by: Raffaello Matarazzo
- Written by: Mario Monicelli; Tullio Pinelli; Ettore Maria Margadonna; Raffaello Matarazzo
- Produced by: Luciano Doria
- Starring: Emilio Ghione Jr.; Mariella Lotti; Emilio Cigoli; Paolo Stoppa
- Cinematography: Alberto Fusi
- Edited by: Vanda Tuzzi
- Music by: Ezio Carabella
- Production company: Metropa Film
- Distributed by: Indipendenti Regionali
- Release date: 5 September 1947
- Running time: 91 minutes
- Country: Italy
- Language: Italian

The Opium Den (Italian: Fumeria d'oppio) is a 1947 Italian crime film directed by Raffaello Matarazzo and starring Emilio Ghione Jr., Mariella Lotti, and Emilio Cigoli. It was an unsuccessful attempt to revive the Za La Mort character, who had been a popular figure during the silent era. Ghione jr. was the son of the actor Emilio Ghione who had originally played the role.

== Cast ==
- Emilio Ghione jr. as Za-la-Mort
- Mariella Lotti as Lina Vidonis, la sorella di Corrado
- Emilio Cigoli as De Rossi, il "Maestro"
- Paolo Stoppa as l'amico di Za-la-Mort
- Armando Francioli as Corrado Vidonis
- Umberto Spadaro as il "Ragno", un complice del "Maestro"
- Arnoldo Foà as altro complice del "Maestro"
- Fedele Gentile as Piero
- Enrico Glori as il commissario
- Checco Durante as Antonio, il finto cieco
- Augusto Di Giovanni as Giacomo, l'assassino
- Erminio Spalla as il fabbroferraio
- Domenico Serra as il brigadiere
- Margherita Bossi Nicosia as la padrona dell'osteria
- Fiore Forges Davanzati as l'infermiera nella villa
- Adriana De Roberto as Irene
- Marichetta Stoppa as Lidia
- Eugenio Duse as l'uomo delirante
- Aristide Garbini as il custode della villa del "Maestro"
- Roberto Mauri as un drogato dall'oppio
- Ciro Berardi as altro membro della banda di ladri
- Ida Bracci Dorati
- Aedo Galvani

== Bibliography ==
- Moliterno, Gino. The A to Z of Italian Cinema. Scarecrow Press, 2009.
