= Tragico convegno =

Tragico Convegno
- Directed by: Ivo Illuminati
- Produced by: Celio Film (Italy)
- Starring: Maria Jacobini
- Distributed by: Internationaal Filmverhuurkantoor Jean Desmet (Amsterdam) and others
- Release date: 1915
- Running time: Estimate of the original length: 900 - 1065 meter
- Country: Italy
- Language: Silent

Tragico convegno is an Italian silent movie with colour tinting by director Ivo Illuminati produced in 1915. The story is a melodrama set in an Italian aristocratic environment. The film was considered lost. However, in 2013 Tragico convegno was discovered at EYE Film Institute Netherlands (although the third reel remained missing) and was subsequently presented at the Festival del Cinema Ritrovato in Bologna.

== Plot ==
Lucien has an affair with the married Baroness Fulvia and receives a letter from a friend (dated 18 May 1914) asking him to lodge his daughter Maria. Lucien prepares a children's room, but Maria turns out to be a young lady of eighteen years old. The next day Maria wants to make a tour on horseback and behaves like a cow-girl. Gradually she falls in love with Lucien and tries to wins him over like an adult woman. (This plot summary is based on the incomplete copy.)

== Cast ==
- Angelo Gallina as Lucien Danglar
- Ivo Illuminati as Baron Abruzzio
- Maria Jacobini as Maria Pansa
- Fulvia Perini as ?
- Anna Perini as Baroness Fulvia Abruzzio
