= María Paredes =

María Paredes may refer to:

- María Paredes (film editor)
- María Paredes (table tennis)
