= Villa Falconieri (film) =

1928 silent film

- Directed by: Richard Oswald
- Written by: Alfred Halm
- Based on: Villa Falconieri by Richard Voss
- Produced by: Richard Oswald; Stefano Pittaluga
- Starring: Maria Jacobini; Hans Stüwe; Eve Gray; Clifford McLaglen
- Cinematography: Giovanni Vitrotti
- Production companies: Richard-Oswald-Produktion; Societa Anonima Stefano Pittaluga
- Distributed by: Messtro-Film (Germany)
- Release date: 20 September 1928
- Countries: Germany; Italy
- Languages: Silent; German/Italian intertitles

Villa Falconieri is a 1928 German-Italian silent drama film directed by Richard Oswald and starring Maria Jacobini, Hans Stüwe, and Eve Gray. It was based on the 1896 novel of the same title by Richard Voss.

The film was shot at the Johannisthal Studios in Berlin and the Fert Studios in Berlin. Location shooting took place at the real Villa Falconieri outside Rome. The film's sets were designed by the art director Heinrich Richter. It premiered at the Ufa-Pavillon am Nollendorfplatz in Berlin on 20 September 1928, with the first Italian release taking place in March 1929.

== Synopsis ==
A young count and poet rents the Villa Falconieri to be near to the Princess Sora with whom he believes himself in love. However while there he encounters the beautiful Maria Mariano and her brutish husband Vittorio.

== Cast ==
- Maria Jacobini as Maria Mariano
- Hans Stüwe as Cola Graf Campana, Schriftsteller
- Eve Gray as Prinzessin Sora
- Clifford McLaglen as Vittorio Mariano
- Elena Sangro as Assunta Neri, Schauspielerin
- Joop van Hulzen as Belcampo, ein Dichterling
- Angelo Ferrari as Prinz Sora
- Oreste Bilancia as Daniele
