= Don Manuel, the Bandit =

1929 film

- Directed by: Romano Mengon
- Written by: Hanns Marschall
- Cinematography: Giovanni Vitrotti
- Production company: Mengon-Film
- Distributed by: Mengon-Film
- Release date: 1929
- Country: Germany
- Languages: Silent; German intertitles

Don Manuel, the Bandit (German:Don Manuel, der Bandit) is a 1929 German silent film directed by Romano Mengon.

== Cast ==
In alphabetical order

- Liane D'Orland
- Angelo Ferrari
- Diomira Jacobini
- Judith Massena
- Clifford McLaglen
- Dora Meves
- Karl Platen
- Yvonne Reggia
- Nico Turoff
- Romero Valvidares
