= The Lady of the Camellias (1915 Negroni film) =

1915 film by Baldassarre Negroni

- Directed by: Baldassarre Negroni
- Written by: Alexandre Dumas, fils (novel); Baldassarre Negroni
- Starring: Hesperia; Alberto Collo; Ida Carloni Talli
- Production company: Tiber-film
- Distributed by: Tiber-film
- Release date: 12 August 1915
- Country: Italy
- Languages: Silent; Italian intertitles

The Lady of the Camellias (Italian:La signora delle camelie) is a 1915 Italian historical drama film directed by Baldassarre Negroni and starring Hesperia, Alberto Collo, and Ida Carloni Talli. It is an adaptation of Alexandre Dumas, fils' novel The Lady of the Camellias. Another Italian version The Lady of the Camellias was released the same year.

== Cast ==
- Hesperia as Marguerite Gauthier
- Alberto Collo as Armando Duval
- Ida Carloni Talli as Madame Duvernoy
- Alfonso Cassini as Padre di Armando
- Giulia Cassini-Rizzotto
- Marchese Mario Centurione

== Bibliography ==
- Goble, Alan. The Complete Index to Literary Sources in Film. Walter de Gruyter, 1999.
