= The Courier of the King =

- Directed by: Gennaro Righelli
- Written by: Stendhal (novel); Ignazio Nicolai; Mario Monicelli; Ernesto Guida; Steno; Gennaro Righelli
- Starring: Rossano Brazzi; Irasema Dilián; Valentina Cortese; Carlo Ninchi
- Cinematography: Carlo Montuori
- Edited by: Gennaro Righelli
- Music by: Giuseppe Becce
- Production company: Domus Film
- Distributed by: Fincine
- Release date: 4 December 1947
- Running time: 98 minutes
- Country: Italy
- Language: Italian

The Courier of the King (Italian: Il corriere del re) is a 1947 Italian historical film directed by Gennaro Righelli and starring Rossano Brazzi, Irasema Dilián and Valentina Cortese. It is an adaptation of the 1830 novel The Red and the Black by Stendhal. It was the final film of the veteran director Righelli, who had previously directed a silent version of the story in 1928. The film's sets were designed by the art director Ottavio Scotti.

== Cast ==
- Rossano Brazzi as Julien Sorel
- Irasema Dilián as Mathilde de la Mole
- Valentina Cortese as Louise de Renal
- Carlo Ninchi as Il marchese de la Mole
- Aldo Silvani as Il signor de Renal
- Laura Carli as La signora Valmod
- Fiore Davanzati as Emilia
- Massimo Serato as Maurice Croisenois
- Camillo Pilotto as Valmod
- Oreste Fares as L'abate Chenal
- Armando Francioli as Norbert de la Mole
- Vittorio Sanipoli as Luz
- Nerio Bernardi
- Ida Bracci Dorati
- Magda Forlenza

== Bibliography ==
- Moliterno, Gino. The A to Z of Italian Cinema. Scarecrow Press, 2009.
