= The Sheep (film) =

1920 film

- Directed by: Pio Vanzi
- Starring: Carmen Boni
- Cinematography: Cesare Cavagna
- Production company: Nova Film
- Distributed by: Nova Film
- Release date: March 1920
- Country: Italy
- Languages: Silent; Italian intertitles

The Sheep (Italian: La pecorella) is a 1920 Italian silent film directed by Pio Vanzi and starring Carmen Boni.

== Cast ==
- Carmen Boni
- Ignazio Lupi
- Manlio Mannozzi
- Eugenio Musso
- Fernanda Negri Pouget

== Bibliography ==
- Stewart, John. Italian film: a who's who. McFarland, 1994.
