= But It Isn't Serious =

1921 film by Augusto Camerini

- Directed by: Augusto Camerini
- Written by: Augusto Camerini; Arnaldo Frateili; Luigi Pirandello (novel)
- Cinematography: Cesare Cavagna
- Production company: Nova Film
- Distributed by: Nova Film
- Release date: 2 May 1921
- Country: Italy
- Languages: Silent; Italian intertitles

But It Isn't Serious (Italian: Ma non è una cosa seria) is a 1921 Italian silent film directed by Augusto Camerini and starring Carmen Boni.

== Cast ==
- Carmen Boni
- Romano Calò as Memmo Speranza
- Ignazio Lupi as Il cap. Barranco
- Fernanda Negri Pouget as Gasperina
- Giovanni Schettini

== See also ==
- But It's Nothing Serious (1936)

== Bibliography ==
- Stewart, John. Italian film: a who's who. McFarland, 1994.
