= McLaglen =

McLaglen is a surname. Notable people with the surname include:

- Andrew McLaglen (1920–2014), American film director and actor
- Clifford McLaglen (1892–1978), British actor
- Cyril McLaglen (1899–1987), English actor
- Victor McLaglen (1886–1959), English boxer, World War I officer and actor
