= Orient (1924 film) =

1924 film directed by Gennaro Righelli

- Directed by: Gennaro Righelli
- Written by: Nunzio Malasomma; Gennaro Righelli
- Starring: Maria Jacobini; Harry Liedtke; Magnus Stifter
- Cinematography: Julius Reinwald; Arpad Viragh
- Production company: Trianon-Film
- Distributed by: Trianon-Film
- Release date: 17 October 1924
- Running time: 128 minutes
- Country: Germany
- Languages: Silent; German intertitles

Orient (German: Orient – Die Tochter der Wüste) is a 1924 German silent drama film directed by Gennaro Righelli and starring Maria Jacobini, Harry Liedtke and Magnus Stifter. It was shot at the Grunewald in Berlin and on location in Egypt. The film's sets were designed by the art director István Szirontai Lhotka.

== Cast ==
- Maria Jacobini as Katja / Yamile
- Harry Liedtke as Harry Russin
- Magnus Stifter as Scheich
- Arthur Wellin as Mohand
- Leopold von Ledebur as Mifud
- Viggo Larsen as Bob, Russins Freund
- Louis Ralph as Max
- Sergio Mari as Izzet
- Else Wasa
- Margarete Kupfer

== Bibliography ==
- Bock, Hans-Michael & Bergfelder, Tim. The Concise CineGraph. Encyclopedia of German Cinema. Berghahn Books, 2009.
