= The Sea of Naples =

1919 film directed by Carmine Gallone

- Directed by: Carmine Gallone
- Starring: Alberto Capozzi
- Release date: November 1919
- Country: Italy
- Language: Silent

The Sea of Naples (Italian: Il mare di Napoli) is a 1919 silent Italian drama film directed by Carmine Gallone.

== Cast ==
- Alberto Capozzi as Sergio Stierni
- Mina D'Orvella as Sophia Gorka
- Silvana (actor)|Silvana as Chiara Stella
- Ida Carloni Talli
- Achille Vitti as D. Antonio
- Alfredo Bertone
