= Rudderless (1924 film) =

1924 film

- Directed by: Gennaro Righelli
- Written by: Nunzio Malasomma; Gennaro Righelli
- Starring: Maria Jacobini; Rosa Valetti; Charles Willy Kayser
- Cinematography: Julius Reinwald; Arpad Viragh
- Production company: Trianon-Film
- Distributed by: Trianon-Film
- Release date: 14 April 1924
- Country: Germany
- Languages: Silent; German intertitles

Rudderless (German: Steuerlos) is a 1924 German silent film directed by Gennaro Righelli and starring Maria Jacobini, Rosa Valetti and Charles Willy Kayser. The film's sets were designed by the art director Fritz Kraenke. It premiered on 14 April 1924 at the Ufa-Pavillon am Nollendorfplatz, Berlin.

== Cast ==
- Maria Jacobini
- Rosa Valetti
- Charles Willy Kayser
- Heinrich George
- Olga Engl
- Karl Platen
- Philipp Manning
- Joseph Kustendi
- Viktor Senger
- Clementine Plessner

== Bibliography ==
- Hans-Michael Bock and Tim Bergfelder. The Concise Cinegraph: An Encyclopedia of German Cinema. Berghahn Books.
