= La Boheme (1923 film) =

1923 film

- Directed by: Gennaro Righelli
- Written by: Hanns Kräly; Henri Murger (book); Gennaro Righelli
- Produced by: Maria Jacobini
- Starring: Maria Jacobini; Elena Lunda; Walter Janssen
- Cinematography: Kurt Lande; Franz Stein
- Production company: Jacobini-Film
- Distributed by: National Film
- Release date: 25 March 1923
- Country: Germany
- Languages: Silent; German intertitles

La Boheme (German: Bohème – Künstlerliebe) is a 1923 German silent drama film directed by Gennaro Righelli and starring Maria Jacobini, Elena Lunda, and Walter Janssen. The film's sets were designed by the art director Hans Dreier, Artur Günther and Max Knaake. It premiered in Berlin at the Marmorhaus.

== Cast ==
- Maria Jacobini as Mimi
- Elena Lunda as Musette
- Walter Janssen as Rudolphe
- William Dieterle as Marcel
- Luigi Serventi as Vicomte Paul
- Uschi Elleot as Euphemie
- Julius Brandt as Schaunard
- Jaro Fürth as Colline
- Carl Goetz as Barbemuche
- Olga Limburg as Medemoiselle Amelie
- Wilhelm Bendow as Pomponneau
- Leonhard Haskel as Momus

== Bibliography ==
- Marta Mierendorff & Jackie O'Dell. William Dieterle: der Plutarh von Hollywood : mit einer Studie von Jackie O'Dell. Henschel, 1993.
