= The Doll Queen =

1925 silent film by Gennaro Righelli

- Directed by: Gennaro Righelli
- Written by: Nunzio Malasomma; Gennaro Righelli
- Starring: Maria Jacobini; Harry Liedtke; Viggo Larsen
- Cinematography: Julius Reinwald; Arpad Viragh
- Production company: Trianon-Film
- Distributed by: Trianon-Film
- Release date: January 1925
- Running time: 96 minutes
- Country: Germany
- Languages: Silent; German intertitles

The Doll Queen (German: Die Puppenkönigin) is a 1925 German silent comedy film directed by Gennaro Righelli and starring Maria Jacobini, Harry Liedtke, Viggo Larsen. It was shot at the Grunewald Studios in Berlin. The film's sets were designed by the art director István Szirontai Lhotka.

== Cast ==
- Maria Jacobini as Jeannine Armelle
- Harry Liedtke as Comte Claude du Plessis
- Viggo Larsen
- Margarete Kupfer
- Hans Wassmann
- Erra Bognar
- Hugo Döblin
- Ida Wüst

== Bibliography ==
- Hans-Michael Bock and Tim Bergfelder. The Concise Cinegraph: An Encyclopedia of German Cinema. Berghahn Books, 2009.
