= A Storm Over Zakopane =

1931 German film

- Directed by: Domenico Gambino; Adolf Trotz
- Written by: Gernot Bock-Stieber; Ada Van Roon
- Starring: Domenico Gambino; Alfons Fryland; Lilian Ellis; Hilde von Stolz
- Cinematography: Giovanni Vitrotti
- Music by: Will Meisel; Fritz Wenneis
- Production company: Film-Producktion Löw und Co
- Release date: 2 January 1931
- Running time: 80 minutes
- Country: Germany
- Language: German

A Storm Over Zakopane (German: Sturm über Zakopane or Der Bergführer von Zakopane) is a 1931 German drama film directed by Domenico Gambino and Adolf Trotz and starring Gambino, Alfons Fryland, and Lilian Ellis. The film was made as a co-production with Poland, with a separate Polish language version directed by Józef Lejtes.

== Cast ==
- Domenico Gambino as Carlo, Bergführer
- Alfons Fryland as Harry West
- Lilian Ellis as Viola MacAllan, Tochter
- Hilde von Stolz as Gelähmte junge Frau
- Philipp Manning as MacAllan
- Aruth Wartan
- Angelo Rossi
- Inge Frank
- Ferdinand Bonn
- Eva Simon
- Paul Rehkopf

== Bibliography ==
- Skaff, Sheila (2008). The Law of the Looking Glass: Cinema in Poland, 1896–1939. Athens, OH: Ohio University Press. ISBN 978-0-8214-1784-3.
