= Latest Night News =

1924 film

- Directed by: Emilio Ghione
- Written by: Emilio Ghione
- Starring: Emilio Ghione; Kally Sambucini
- Production company: Alba Film
- Distributed by: Alba Film
- Release date: April 1924
- Country: Italy
- Languages: Silent; Italian intertitles

Latest Night News (Italian: Ultimissime della notte) is a 1924 Italian silent action film directed by Emilio Ghione and starring Ghione and Kally Sambucini. It is part of the long-running series featuring the gentleman thief Za La Mort, who in this film takes on the role of an investigative journalist.

== Cast ==
- Emilio Ghione as Za La Mort
- Kally Sambucini as Za La Vie
- Rita D'Harcourt
- Camillo De Paoli
- Alberto Pasquali
- Vittorio Rossi Pianelli

== Bibliography ==
- Moliterno, Gino. The A to Z of Italian Cinema. Scarecrow Press, 2009.
