= The Red and the Black =

1830 novel by Stendhal

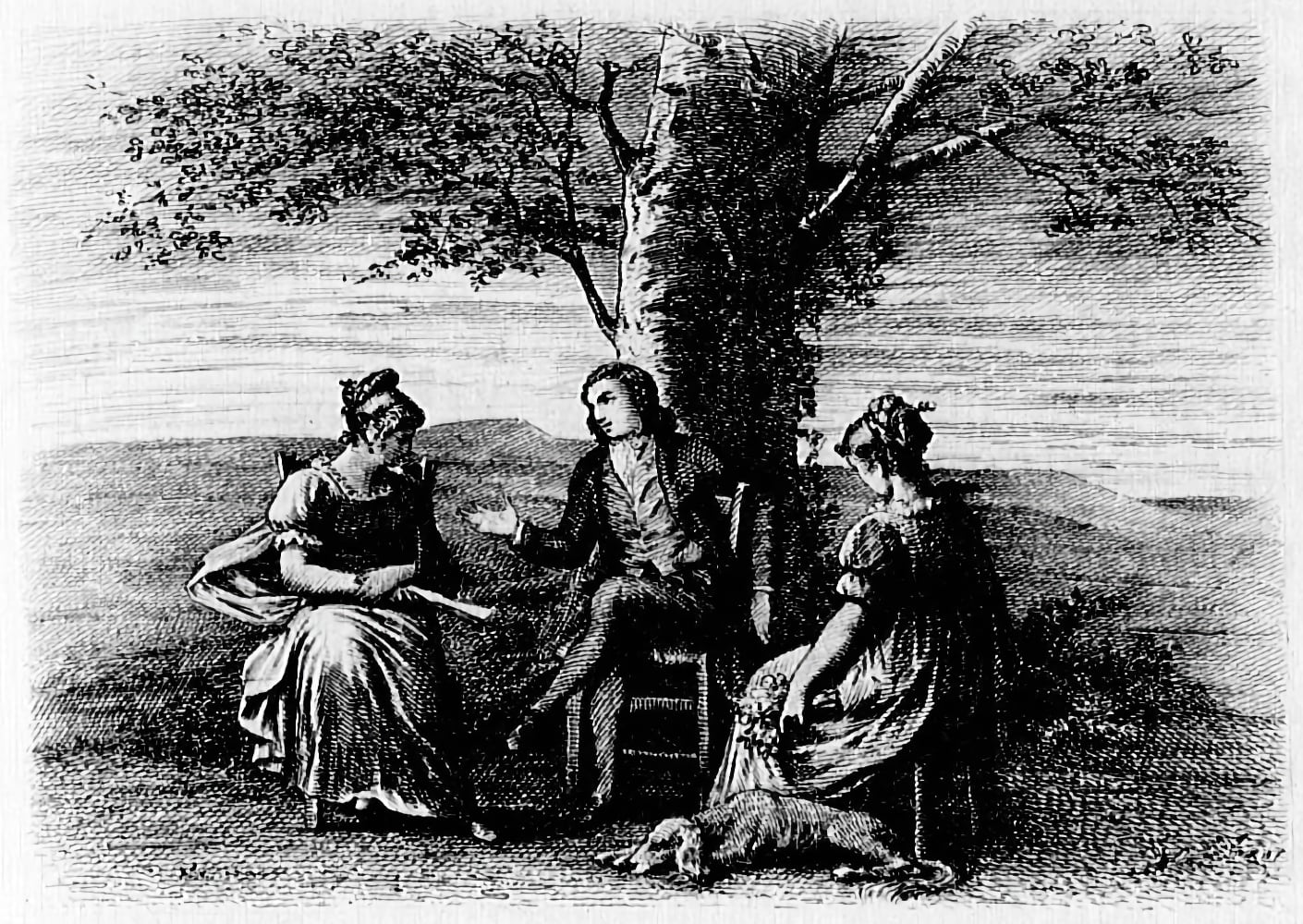
- Henri Dubouchet's illustration for an 1884 edition of Le Rouge et le Noir, Paris: L. Conquet
- Author: Stendhal (Henri Beyle)
- Original title: Le Rouge et le Noir
- Language: French
- Genre: Bildungsroman
- Publisher: A. Levasseur
- Publication date: November 1830
- Publication place: France
- Media type: Print (hardback and paperback)
- Pages: 2 vols.
- OCLC: 18684539
- Dewey Decimal: 843/.7 19
- LC Class: PQ2435.R72 H35 1989
- Original text: Le Rouge et le Noir at French Wikisource
- Translation: The Red and the Black at Wikisource

Le Rouge et le Noir (French pronunciation: [lə ʁuʒ e l(ə) nwaʁ]; meaning The Red and the Black) is a psychological novel in two volumes by Stendhal, published in 1830. It chronicles the attempts of a provincial young man to rise socially beyond his modest upbringing through a combination of talent, hard work, deception, and hypocrisy. He ultimately allows his passions to betray him.

The novel's full title, Le Rouge et le Noir: Chronique du XIX^{e} siècle (The Red and the Black: A Chronicle of the 19th Century), indicates its twofold literary purpose as both a psychological portrait of the romantic protagonist, Julien Sorel, and an analytic, sociological satire of the French social order under the Bourbon Restoration (1814–1830). In English, Le Rouge et le Noir variously is translated as Red and Black, Scarlet and Black, and The Red and the Black, without the subtitle.

The title is taken to refer to the tension between the clerical and secular interests of the protagonist, represented by each of the title colors, but it could also refer to the casino card game "rouge et noir", with the card game being the narratological leitmotiv of a novel in which chance and luck determine the fate of the main character. There are other interpretations as well.

== Background ==
Le Rouge et le Noir is the Bildungsroman of Julien Sorel, the intelligent and ambitious protagonist. He comes from a poor family and fails to understand much about the ways of the world he sets out to conquer. He harbours many romantic illusions, but becomes mostly a pawn in the political machinations of the ruthless and influential people about him. The adventures of the hero satirize early 19th-century French society, accusing the aristocracy and Catholic clergy of being hypocritical and materialistic, foretelling the radical changes that will soon depose them from their leading roles in French society.

The first volume's epigraph "La vérité, l'âpre vérité" ("The truth, the harsh truth") is attributed to Danton, but like most of the chapters' epigraphs it is fictional. The title refers (among other things—see meanings in previous section) to the contrasting uniforms of the army and the church. Accordingly, early in the story, Julien Sorel observes that under the Bourbon Restoration it is impossible for a man of his plebeian class to distinguish himself in the (red-uniformed) army (as he might have done under Napoleon), hence only a (black-uniformed) church career offers social advancement and glory.

In complete editions, the first book ("Livre premier", ending after Chapter XXX) concludes with the quotation "To the Happy Few" from The Vicar of Wakefield by Oliver Goldsmith, parts of which Stendhal had memorized in the course of teaching himself English. In The Vicar, "the happy few" read the title character's obscure and pedantic treatise on monogamy—alone.

== Plot ==
In two volumes, The Red and the Black: A Chronicle of the 19th Century tells the story of Julien Sorel's life in France's rigid social structure restored after the disruptions of the French Revolution and the reign of Napoleon Bonaparte.

=== Book I ===
Julien Sorel, the ambitious son of a carpenter in the fictional village of Verrières, in Franche-Comté, France, would rather read and daydream about the glorious victories of Napoleon's long-disbanded army than work in his father's timber business with his brothers, who beat him for his intellectual pretensions. He becomes an acolyte of the Abbé Chélan, the local Catholic prelate, who secures for Julien a job tutoring the children of Monsieur de Rênal, the mayor of Verrières. Although representing himself as a pious, austere cleric, Julien is uninterested in religious studies beyond the Bible's literary value and his ability to use memorized Latin passages to impress his social superiors.

He begins a love affair with Monsieur de Rênal's wife, which ends when her chambermaid, Elisa, who is also in love with Julien, makes it known to the village. The Abbé Chélan orders Julien to a seminary in Besançon, which he finds intellectually stifling and populated by social cliques. The initially cynical seminary director, the Abbé Pirard, likes Julien and becomes his protector. When the Abbé, a Jansenist, leaves the seminary, he fears Julien will suffer for having been his protégé and recommends Sorel as private secretary to the diplomat Marquis de la Mole, a Catholic legitimist.

=== Book II ===
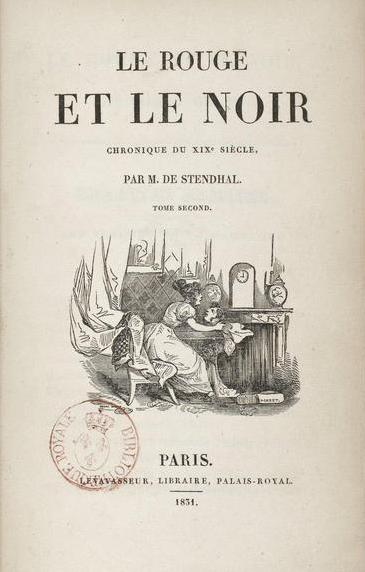
The second volume of the 1831 edition of The Red and the Black.

In the years leading up to the July Revolution of 1830, Julien Sorel lives in Paris as an employee of the de la Mole family. Despite his sophistication and intellect, Julien is condescended to as an uncouth plebeian by the de la Moles and their friends. Meanwhile, Julien is acutely aware of the materialism and hypocrisy that permeate the Parisian elite and that the counterrevolutionary temper of the time renders it impossible for even well-born men of superior intellect and aesthetic sensibility to participate in the nation's public affairs.

Julien accompanies the Marquis de la Mole to a secret meeting, then is dispatched on a dangerous mission to communicate a letter from memory to the Duc d'Angoulême, who is exiled in England; but the callow Julien is distracted by an unrequited love affair and learns the message only by rote, missing its political significance as part of a legitimist plot. Unwittingly, he risks his life in service to the monarchists he most opposes; to himself, he rationalises these actions as merely helping the Marquis, his employer, whom he respects.

Meanwhile, the Marquis's languorous daughter, Mathilde de la Mole, has become emotionally torn between her romantic attraction to Julien for his admirable personal and intellectual qualities and her revulsion at becoming sexually intimate with a lower-class man. At first Julien finds her unattractive, but his interest is piqued by her attentions and the admiration she inspires in others; twice, she seduces and rejects him, leaving him in a miasma of despair, self-doubt, and happiness (for having won her over her aristocratic suitors). Only during his secret mission does he learn the key to winning her affections: a cynical jeu d'amour (game of love) taught to him by Prince Korasoff, a Russian man-of-the-world. At great emotional cost, Julien feigns indifference to Mathilde, provoking her jealousy with a sheaf of love letters meant to woo Madame de Fervaques, a widow in the social circle of the de la Mole family. Consequently, Mathilde sincerely falls in love with Julien, eventually revealing to him that she carries his child; nevertheless, while he is on diplomatic mission in England, she becomes officially engaged to Monsieur de Croisenois, an amiable and wealthy young noble, heir to a duchy.

Learning of Julien's liaison with Mathilde, the Marquis de la Mole is angered, but he relents before her determination and his affection for Julien and bestows upon Julien an income-producing property attached to an aristocratic title as well as a military commission in the army. Although ready to bless their marriage, the marquis changes his mind after receiving a character-reference letter about Julien from the Abbé Chélan, Julien's previous employer in Verrières. Written by Madame de Rênal at the urging of her confessor priest, the letter warns the marquis that Julien is a social-climbing cad who preys upon emotionally vulnerable women.

On learning that the marquis now withholds his blessing of his marriage, Julien Sorel returns with a gun to Verrières and shoots Madame de Rênal during Mass in the village church; she survives, but Julien is imprisoned and sentenced to death. Mathilde tries to save him by bribing local officials, and Madame de Rênal, still in love with him, refuses to testify and pleads for his acquittal, aided by the priests who have looked after him since his early childhood. Yet Julien is determined to die, for the materialistic society of Restoration France has no place for a low-born man, whatever his intellect or sensibilities.

Meanwhile, Monsieur de Croisenois, the presumptive duke and one of the fortunate few of Bourbon France, is killed in a duel over a slur upon the honour of Mathilde de la Mole. Her undiminished love for Julien, his imperiously intellectual nature and romantic exhibitionism render Mathilde's prison visits to him a duty to endure and little more.

When Julien learns that Madame de Rênal survived her gunshot wound, his authentic love for her is resurrected, having lain dormant throughout his Parisian sojourn, and she continues to visit him in jail. After he is guillotined, Mathilde de la Mole reenacts the cherished 16th-century French tale of Queen Margot, who visited her dead lover, Joseph Boniface de La Mole, to kiss the forehead of his severed head. Mathilde then erects a shrine at Julien's tomb in the Italian fashion. Madame de Rênal, more quietly, dies in the arms of her children only three days later.

== Structure and themes ==
Le Rouge et le Noir is set in the latter years of the Bourbon Restoration (1814–1830) and the days of the 1830 July Revolution that established the Kingdom of the French (1830–1848). Julien Sorel's worldly ambitions are motivated by the emotional tensions between his idealistic Republicanism and his nostalgic allegiance to Napoleon and the realistic politics of counter-revolutionary conspiracy by Jesuit-supported legitimists, notably the Marquis de la Mole, whom Julien serves for personal gain. Presuming a knowledgeable reader, Stendhal only alludes to the historical background of Le Rouge et le Noir—yet did subtitle the novel Chronique de 1830 ("Chronicle of 1830"). Similarly, the historical background is depicted in Lucien Leuwen (1834), one of Stendhal's unfinished novels, posthumously published in 1894. Erich Auerbach in Mimesis: The Representation of Reality in Western Literature sees this use of specific historical context as something entirely new in literature: "So logically and systematically to situate the tragically conceived life of a man of low social position (as here that of Julien Sorel) within the most concrete kind of contemporary history and to develop it therefrom— this is an entirely new and highly significant phenomenon."

Stendhal repeatedly questions the possibility and the desirability of "sincerity" because most of the characters, especially Julien Sorel, are acutely aware of having to play a role to gain social approval. In that 19th-century context, the word "hypocrisy" denoted the affectation of high religious sentiment; in The Red and the Black it connotes the contradiction between thinking and feeling.

In Mensonge romantique et vérité romanesque (Deceit, Desire and the Novel, 1961), philosopher and critic René Girard identifies in Le Rouge et le Noir the triangular structure he denominates as "mimetic desire"; that is, one desires a person only when he or she is desired by someone else. Girard's proposition is that a person's desire for another always is mediated by a third party. This triangulation thus accounts for the perversity of the Mathilde–Julien relationship, which is most evident when Julien begins courting the widow Mme de Fervaques to pique Mathilde's jealousy, and it accounts for Julien's fascination with and membership in the high society he simultaneously desires and despises. To help achieve a literary effect, Stendhal wrote most of the epigraphs—literary, poetic, historic quotations—that he attributed to others.

== Literary and critical significance ==
André Gide stated that The Red and the Black was a novel ahead of its time, that it was a novel for readers in the 20th century. In Stendhal's time, prose novels included dialogue and descriptions from omniscient narrator; Stendhal's great contribution to literary technique was the describing of the psychologies (emotions, thoughts, and interior monologues) of the characters. As a result, he is considered the creator of the psychological novel.

In Jean-Paul Sartre's play Les Mains sales (1948), the protagonist Hugo Barine suggests pseudonyms for himself, including Julien Sorel, whom he resembles.

In the afterword to her novel them, Joyce Carol Oates wrote that she had titled the manuscript Love and Money as a nod to classic 19th-century novels, among them The Red and the Black, "whose class-conscious hero Julien Sorel is less idealistic, greedier, and crueler than Jules Wendall but is clearly his spiritual kinsman."

A passage describing Julien Sorel's sexual indifference is deployed as the epigraph to Paul Schrader's screenplay of American Gigolo, whose protagonist is named Julien: "The idea of a duty to be performed, and the fear of making himself ridiculous if he failed to perform it, immediately removed all pleasure from his heart."

Former U.S. Vice President Al Gore named The Red and the Black as his favorite book. It is also one of the books in Emmanuel Macron's official portrait.

== Translations ==
Le Rouge et le Noir, Chronique du XIX^{e} siècle (1830) first was translated into English ca. 1900; the best-known translation, The Red and the Black (1926) by C. K. Scott Moncrieff, has been, like his other translations, characterised as one of his "fine, spirited renderings, not entirely accurate on minor points of meaning ... Scott Moncrieff's versions have not really been superseded." The version by Robert M. Adams for the Norton Critical Editions series is highly regarded; it "is more colloquial; his edition includes an informative section on backgrounds and sources, and excerpts from critical studies." Other translators include Margaret R. B. Shaw (as Scarlet and Black for Penguin Classics, 1953), Lowell Blair (Bantam Books, 1959), Lloyd C. Parks (New York, 1970), Catherine Slater (Oxford World's Classics, 1991), Roger Gard (Penguin Classics, 2002), and Raymond N. MacKenzie (University of Minnesota Press, 2022).

The 2006 translation by Burton Raffel for the Modern Library edition generally earned positive reviews, and Salon.com stated "[Burton Raffel's] exciting new translation of The Red and the Black blasts Stendhal into the twenty-first century." Michael Johnson for The New York Times wrote "Now The Red and the Black is getting a new lease on life with an updated English-language version by the renowned translator Burton Raffel. His version has all but replaced the decorous text produced in the 1920s by the Scottish-born writer–translator C. K. Scott-Moncrieff".

== Burned in 1964 Brazil ==
Following the 1964 Brazilian coup d'état, General Justino Alves Bastos, commander of the Third Army, ordered, in Rio Grande do Sul, the burning of all "subversive books". Among the books he branded as subversive was The Red and the Black.

== Adaptations ==
=== Film ===
- Der geheime Kurier (The Secret Courier) is a silent 1928 German film by Gennaro Righelli, featuring Ivan Mosjoukine, Lil Dagover, and Valeria Blanka.
- Il Corriere del re (The Courier of the King) is a 1947 Italian film adaptation of the story directed by Gennaro Righelli. It features Rossano Brazzi, Valentina Cortese, and Irasema Dilián.
- Another film adaptation of the novel was released in 1954, directed by Claude Autant-Lara. It stars Gérard Philipe, Antonella Lualdi, and Danielle Darrieux. It won the French Syndicate of Cinema Critics award for the best film of the year.
- Le Rouge et le Noir is a 1961 French TV film directed by Pierre Cardinal, with Robert Etcheverry, Micheline Presle, Marie Laforêt, and Jean-Roger Caussimon.
- A BBC TV miniseries in five episodes, The Scarlet and the Black, was made in 1965, starring John Stride, June Tobin, and Karin Fernald. It is unknown if the serial still exists as it has not been seen or documented in decades.
- Красное и чёрное (Krasnoe i čërnoe) (Red and Black) is a 1976 Soviet film version, directed by Sergei Gerasimov, with Nikolai Yeryomenko Ml, Natalya Bondarchuk, and Natalya Belokhvostikova.
- Another BBC TV miniseries titled Scarlet and Black was broadcast in 1993, starring Ewan McGregor, Rachel Weisz, and Stratford Johns as the Abbé Pirard. A notable addition to the plot was the spirit of Napoleon (Christopher Fulford), who advises Sorel (McGregor) through his rise and fall.
- A TV film of the novel titled The Red and the Black was broadcast in 1997 by Koch Lorber Films, starring Kim Rossi Stuart, Carole Bouquet, and Judith Godrèche; it was directed by Jean-Daniel Verhaeghe. This version is available on DVD.

=== Theater ===
- A Japanese musical The Red and the Black (赤と黒). The first adaptation by Kazuo Kikuta was produced by all-female theater troupe Takarazuka Revue in 1957 and starred Hanayo Sumi, Kaoru Yodo, and Yachiyo Ootori. Since then it has been performed in 1975, 1989, 2008 and 2020.
- A French musical Le Rouge et le Noir – L'opéra rock, produced by Albert Cohen and directed by François Chouquet and Laurent Seroussi; it starred Côme, Haylen and Yoann Launay among others. After its premier in 2016, the show went on a tour in China. It was also performed by Takarazuka Revue in 2023 and was staged in Tokyo Metropolitan Theater in 2023 and Umeda Arts Theater in 2024.

== See also ==
- Bildungsroman

== Bibliography ==
- Burt, Daniel S. (2003). The Novel 100. Checkmark Books. ISBN 0-8160-4558-5.
