= Saetta Learns to Live =

1924 film

- Directed by: Guido Brignone
- Written by: Pier Angelo Mazzolotti
- Starring: Domenico Gambino; Pauline Polaire
- Cinematography: Massimo Terzano
- Production company: Fert Film
- Distributed by: Fert Film
- Release date: May 1924
- Country: Italy
- Languages: Silent; Italian intertitles

Saetta Learns to Live (Italian: Saetta impara a vivere) is a 1924 Italian silent film directed by Guido Brignone and starring Domenico Gambino and Pauline Polaire. It was made by the Turin-based Fert Film.

== Cast ==
- Domenico Gambino as Saetta
- Pauline Polaire
- Rita D'Harcourt
- Liliana Ardea
- Alberto Collo
- Giuseppe Brignone
- Franz Sala
- Armand Pouget
- Augusto Bandini

== Bibliography ==
- Jacqueline Reich. The Maciste Films of Italian Silent Cinema. Indiana University Press, 2015.
