= Thieves (1928 film) =

1928 film

- Directed by: Domenico Gambino; Edmund Heuberger
- Written by: Edmund Heuberger
- Produced by: Joseph Candolini
- Starring: Hellen Allan; William Dieterle; Domenico Gambino
- Cinematography: Georg Muschner
- Music by: Hansheinrich Dransmann
- Production company: Cando-Film
- Release date: 1928
- Country: Germany
- Languages: Silent; German intertitles

Thieves (German: Diebe) is a 1928 German silent film directed by Domenico Gambino and Edmund Heuberger and starring Hellen Allan, William Dieterle and Domenico Gambino. The film's sets were designed by the art director August Rinaldi.

== Cast ==
- Hellen Allan
- William Dieterle
- Domenico Gambino

== Bibliography ==
- Bock, Hans-Michael & Bergfelder, Tim. The Concise CineGraph. Encyclopedia of German Cinema. Berghahn Books, 2009.
