= Broken Idol =

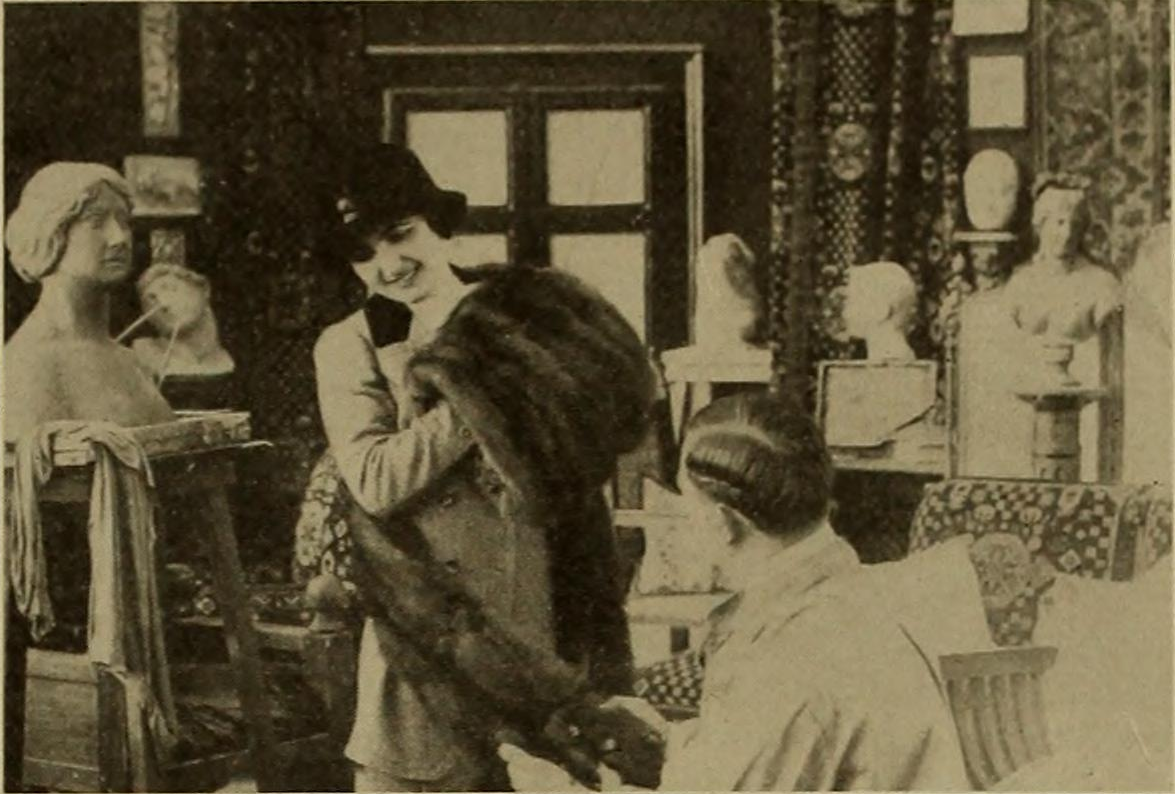
- Directed by: Emilio Ghione
- Starring: Francesca Bertini; Angelo Gallina; Alberto Collo
- Production company: Celio Film
- Distributed by: Società Italiana Cines
- Release date: October 1913
- Running time: 2 reels
- Country: Italy
- Languages: Silent; Italian intertitles

Broken Idol (Italian:Idolo infranto) is a 1913 Italian silent short drama film directed by Emilio Ghione and starring Francesca Bertini, Angelo Gallina and Alberto Collo.

== Cast ==
- Francesca Bertini
- Angelo Gallina
- Alberto Collo

== Bibliography ==
- Moliterno, Gino. The A to Z of Italian Cinema. Scarecrow Press, 2009.
