= Public Trial (film) =

- Directed by: Florián Rey
- Written by: Rogelio Perioult (book); Florián Rey
- Starring: Paola Barbara
- Cinematography: José F. Aguayo
- Edited by: María Paredes
- Music by: Rafael Martínez
- Production company: Suevia Films
- Distributed by: Suevia Films
- Release date: 20 September 1946
- Running time: 97 minutes
- Country: Spain
- Language: Spanish

Public Trial (Spanish: Audiencia pública) is a 1946 Spanish drama film directed by Florián Rey and starring Paola Barbara.

The film's sets were designed by the art director Francisco Canet.

== Cast ==
- Fernando Aguirre
- Matilde Artero
- Paola Barbara
- Anita Bass
- Raúl Cancio
- Francisco Delgado Tena
- Mary Delgado
- Ramón Giner
- José María Lado
- Regina Ley
- Ramón Martori
- Alfredo Mayo
- José Nieto
- Alicia Palacios
- Nicolás D. Perchicot
- José Prada
- Santiago Rivero
- Porfiria Sanchíz
- Mary Santpere
- Lolita Valcárcel
- Aníbal Vela
- Juan Vázquez

== Bibliography ==
- Labanyi, Jo & Pavlović, Tatjana. A Companion to Spanish Cinema. John Wiley & Sons, 2012.
