= Gian Luca Tocchi =

Italian composer

- Born: 10 January 1901; Perugia, Italy
- Died: 14 September 1992 (aged 91); Rome, Italy
- Occupation: Composer

Gian Luca Tocchi (10 January 1901 – 14 September 1992) was an Italian composer. He studied with Ottorino Respighi and Bernardino Molinari at the Accademia di Santa Cecilia in Rome. His work was part of the music event in the art competition at the 1936 Summer Olympics.
