= Lilian Ellis =

Danish actress (1907–1951)

Lilian Ellis (25 May 1907 – 21 February 1951) was a Danish actress. She was born as Ellis Stampe Bendix.

== Selected filmography ==
- Strauss Is Playing Today (1928)
- Lieutenant of His Majesty (1929)
- Wiener Herzen (1930)
- A Thousand Words of German (1930)
- Errant Husbands (1931)
- The Merry Wives of Vienna (1931)
- A Storm Over Zakopane (1931)
- The Woman They Talk About (1931)
- The Theft of the Mona Lisa (1931)
- En melodi om våren (1943)
- Elly Petersen (1944)
- De kloge og vi gale (1945)

== Bibliography ==
- Jung, Uli & Schatzberg, Walter. Beyond Caligari: The Films of Robert Wiene. Berghahn Books, 1999.
