= The Last Performance of the Circus Wolfson =

1928 film directed by Domenico Gambino

- Hellen Allan in a scene from the film
- Directed by: Domenico Gambino
- Written by: Domenico Gambino
- Starring: Hermann Vallentin; Lydia Potechina
- Cinematography: Paul Holzki; Franz Meinecke; Erich Nitzschmann; László Schäffer; Giovanni Vitrotti
- Production company: Rosenfeld Film
- Distributed by: Deutsche Lichtspiel-Syndikat
- Release date: 11 April 1928
- Country: Germany
- Languages: Silent; German intertitles

The Last Performance of the Circus Wolfson (German: Die letzte Galavorstellung des Zirkus Wolfson) is a 1928 German silent film directed by Domenico Gambino and starring Hermann Vallentin. The film's sets were designed by the art directors Willi Herrmann and Fritz Willi Krohn.

== Cast ==
- Hermann Vallentin as Direktor Wolfson
- Hellen Allan as Eva, seine Tochter
- Saetta Gambino as Gaston Serato
- Adelmo Burini as Garrigan - Artist
- Mario Cusmich as Der Sekretär
- Fritz Ruß as Clown Polidor
- Lydia Potechina as Dame mit heißem Herzen
- Johanna Ewald as Die gestrenge Gattin
- Oreste Bilancia as Der Herr Gemahl
- Ernst Hofmann as Der Jüngling, Pantomime
- Hilde Jennings as Das Mädchen, Pantomime
- Raimondo Van Riel as Der Satan, Pantomime
- Xenia Ledoff as Die Tänzerin, Pantomime

== Bibliography ==
- Fritz Güttinger. Köpfen Sie mal ein Ei in Zeitlupe!: Streifzüge durch die Welt des Stummfilms. Fink, 1992.
