= Tortured Soul =

1919 Italian silent film by Mario Caserini

- Directed by: Mario Caserini
- Starring: Maria Jacobini; Andrea Habay; Alberto Collo
- Production company: Tiber-film
- Distributed by: Tiber-film
- Release date: February 1919
- Country: Italy
- Languages: Silent; Italian intertitles

Tortured Soul (Italian: Anima tormentata) is a 1919 Italian silent film directed by Mario Caserini and starring Maria Jacobini, Andrea Habay and Alberto Collo. Alessandro Blasetti, a leading Italian director of the Fascist era, had his first contact with filmmaking by appearing as an extra.

== Cast ==
- Maria Jacobini
- Andrea Habay
- Alberto Collo
- Ida Carloni Talli
- Alfredo Martinelli
- Alessandro Blasetti

== Bibliography ==
- Reich, Jacqueline & Garofalo, Piero. Re-viewing Fascism: Italian Cinema, 1922-1943. Indiana University Press, 2002.
