= Return to Naples =

1949 film directed by Domenico Gambino

- Directed by: Domenico Gambino
- Written by: Domenico Gambino
- Produced by: Domenico Gambino
- Starring: Maria D'Ayala; Carlo Lombardi; Paola Barbara
- Cinematography: Edoardo Lamberti
- Music by: Ulisse Siciliani
- Production company: Central Film
- Release date: 1949
- Running time: 81 minutes
- Country: Italy
- Language: Italian

Return to Naples (Italian: Torna a Napoli) is a 1949 Italian melodrama film directed by Domenico Gambino and starring Maria D'Ayala, Carlo Lombardi and Paola Barbara.

== Cast ==
- Nino Manfredi as Francisco
- Carlo Lombardi as Angelo
- Paola Barbara as Adriana
- Marina Bonfigli as Mimi
- Maria D'Ayala as Lucia
- Vittorio Duse as Mario
- Carlo Sposito as Vittorio
- Leopoldo Valentini as Alberto
- Italia Marchesini as Gina
- Renato Terra as Nino
- Mimì Ferrari
- Silvana Jachino
- Vincenzo Mazzola
- Pino Serpe
- Paolo Vinci

== Bibliography ==
- Bernardini, Aldo. Nino Manfredi. Gremese Editore, 1999.
