= Saetta Saves the Queen =

1920 film

- Directed by: Ettore Ridoni
- Starring: Domenico Gambino
- Cinematography: Natale Chiusano
- Production company: Delta Film
- Distributed by: Delta Film
- Release date: June 1920
- Country: Italy
- Languages: Silent; Italian intertitles

Saetta Saves the Queen (Italian: Saetta salva la regina) is a 1920 Italian silent adventure film directed by Ettore Ridoni and starring Domenico Gambino.

== Cast ==
- Domenico Gambino as Saetta
- Raffaele di Napoli
- Guido Pistono
- Tina Ronay
- Lina Spina
- Luigi Stinchi

== Bibliography ==
- Jacqueline Reich. The Maciste Films of Italian Silent Cinema. Indiana University Press, 2015.
