= Eugenio Duse =

Italian stage and film actor

- Born: 24 January 1889; Senigallia, Marche, Italy
- Died: 24 November 1969 (aged 80); Bologna, Emilia-Romagna, Italy
- Occupation: Actor
- Years active: 1921-1952 (film)

Eugenio Duse (1889–1969) was an Italian stage and film actor who appeared in thirty-one films during his career. He was a relative of the celebrated stage actress Eleonora Duse.

== Selected filmography ==
- Cainà (1922)
- Your Money or Your Life (1932)
- Loyalty of Love (1934)
- The Joker King (1935)
- Golden Arrow (1935)
- La Damigella di Bard (1936)
- Giuseppe Verdi (1938)
- It Always Ends That Way (1939)
- The Boarders at Saint-Cyr (1939)
- The Hotel of the Absent (1939)
- The First Woman Who Passes (1940)
- The Hero of Venice (1941)
- The Adulteress (1946)
- The Opium Den (1947)

== Bibliography ==
- Hochkofler, Matilde. Anna Magnani. Gremese Editore, 2001.
