= White Amazons =

1936 film

- Directed by: Gennaro Righelli
- Written by: Gino Valori (novel); Marcello Albani; Ferruccio Biancini; Gennaro Righelli
- Starring: Paola Barbara; Luisa Ferida; Doris Duranti; Sandro Ruffini
- Cinematography: Ferdinando Martini; Augusto Tiezzi
- Edited by: Giacomo Gentilomo
- Music by: Antonio D'Elia
- Production company: Arbor Film
- Distributed by: Piemonte Film
- Release date: 1936
- Running time: 83 minutes
- Country: Italy
- Language: Italian

White Amazons (Italian: Amazzoni bianche) is a 1936 Italian white telephone comedy film directed by Gennaro Righelli and starring Paola Barbara, Luisa Ferida and Doris Duranti. Screwball in style, it is part of the tradition of schoolgirl comedies of the Fascist era.

== Plot ==
The film is set in a winter sports resort, where an all-female race with a prize of two hundred thousand lira for the winner provokes rivalry and confusions.

== Cast ==
- Paola Barbara as Mara Danieli
- Luisa Ferida as Luisa Carrai
- Doris Duranti as Giulietta
- Sandro Ruffini as Mario Gualdi
- Clara Padoa as Margherita Menardi
- Enrico Viarisio as Simone Gualtieri
- Olinto Cristina as Biancheri
- Mario Pisu as Biancheri
- Maria Arcione as Laura
- Valentino Bruchi as Luigi Allegri
- Nicola Maldacea as direttore Circolo Sciatori
- Lulu Marinelli as Berta
- Adrianna Miramonti as Giorgetta
- Tamara Nera as Antonietta

== Bibliography ==
- Reich, Jacqueline Beth. Fascism, Film, and Female Subjectivity: The Case of Italian Cinema 1936-1943. University of California, Berkeley, 1994.
