= The Woman Disputed =

1928 film

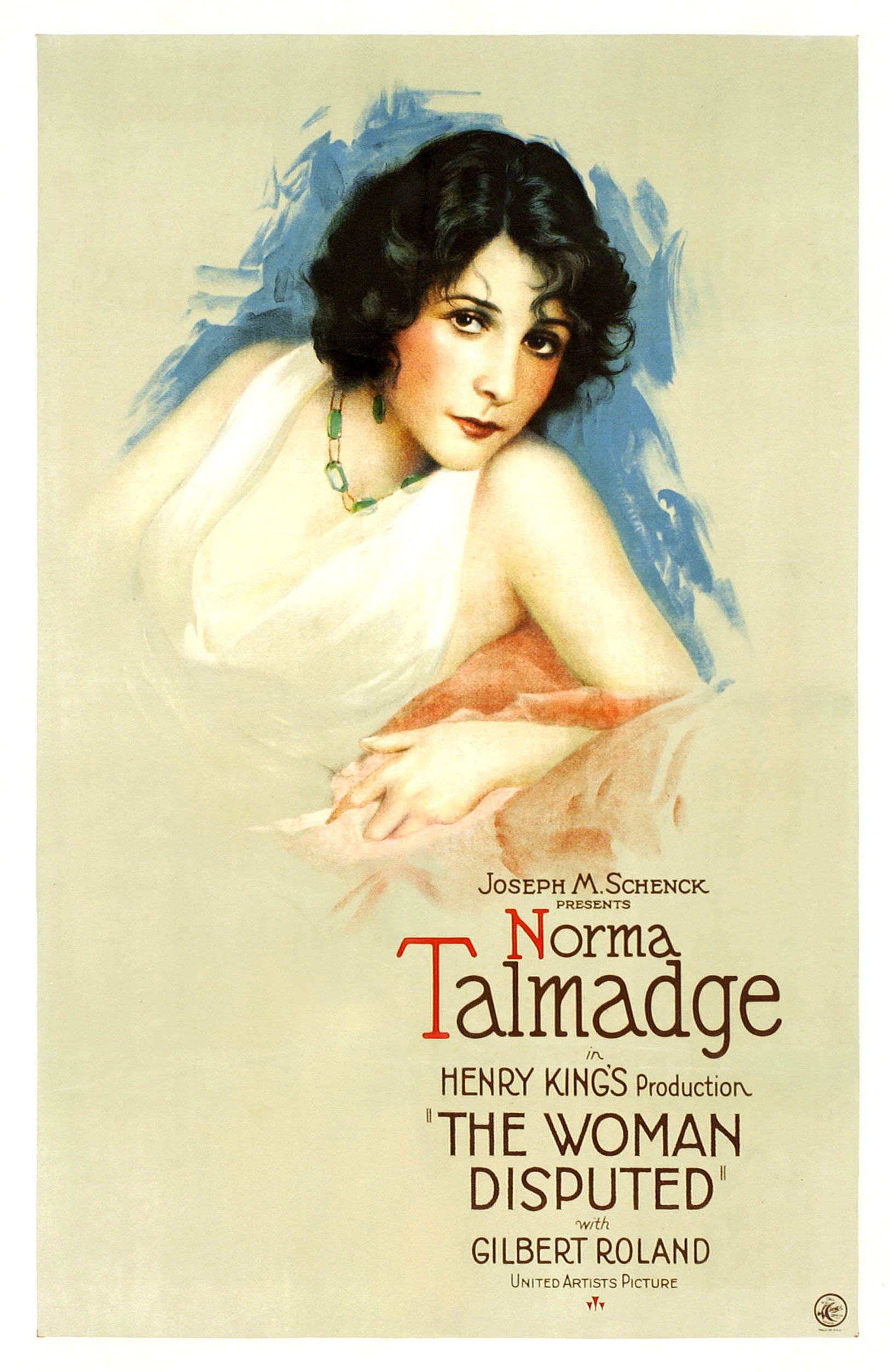
- Theatrical release poster
- Directed by: Henry King; Sam Taylor
- Written by: C. Gardner Sullivan
- Screenplay by: C. Gardner Sullivan
- Produced by: Joseph M. Schenck; Norma Talmadge
- Starring: Norma Talmadge; Gilbert Roland; Arnold Kent
- Cinematography: Oliver T. Marsh
- Edited by: Hal C. Kern
- Music by: Hugo Riesenfeld
- Production company: Feature Productions
- Distributed by: United Artists
- Release date: September 1928
- Running time: 108 minutes
- Country: United States
- Language: Sound film (Synchronized)

The Woman Disputed is a 1928 American synchronized sound drama film directed by Henry King and Sam Taylor. While the film has no audible dialog, it was released with a synchronized musical score with sound effects using both the sound-on-disc and sound-on-film process. The plot draws in part on the 1880 short story "Boule de Suif" by French writer Guy de Maupassant.

Norma Talmadge stars as a good-hearted Austrian prostitute drawn into a romantic triangle on the eve of World War I. Based on a Denison Clift play, the nationalities of the characters had to be adjusted to satisfy official complaints registered with the MPPDA from the German government.

This film would be the last film Talmadge made without audible dialogue. After this film was completed she separated from her husband and producer Schenck. Talmadge would spend much of the following year on vocal lessons in preparation for her first talking picture. Talmadge appeared in two talking films. The lackluster response to them forced her into an early retirement.

== Plot ==
In the city of Lemberg, Austria, Mary Ann Wagner, a street girl with a tarnished past but a noble heart, finds unexpected kindness from two young military officers: the warm and affable Austrian Lieutenant Paul Hartman and his proud Russian friend, Lieutenant Nika Turgenov, on furlough from his post. Their friendship and trust awaken something new in Mary Ann, a sense of self worth and dignity, and she begins to reform her life. So grateful is she for their friendship that she fails to realize both men have secretly fallen in love with her.

Then war erupts between Austria and Russia. One morning, Paul and Nika each receive urgent orders to return to their regiments. Nika’s first instinct is to call Mary Ann, but she is not at home. Surprised and troubled by her absence at such an early hour, he visits Paul only to find Mary Ann in Paul’s room, helping him pack.

This moment of impending separation forces Paul and Mary Ann to confront their feelings, and they realize they are in love. When Nika confesses his love and asks Mary Ann to come back to Russia with him, Paul intervenes, revealing that Mary Ann has promised to become his wife.

Shattered and betrayed, Nika erupts in jealous fury, accusing them of deceiving him and making love behind his back. Enraged, he nearly comes to blows with Paul, but Mary Ann steps between them—the “disputed woman”—begging Nika to understand the truth. But Nika storms out, vowing revenge.

His chance comes months later. Now a Russian officer stationed in Lemberg, which has fallen to Russian control, Nika presides over a tribunal judging Mary Ann and five others (including Father Roche) who are caught trying to flee the city in defiance of martial law. The Russian authorities, desperate to trap Libert, a legendary Austrian spy believed to be operating in the city, have decreed death for violators.

As judge, Nika gives the condemned a cruel ultimatum: all may go free—if Mary Ann spends the night with him. She is horrified. Though the others beg her to accept and save their lives, Mary Ann, loyal to Paul and her sense of dignity, prepares to face death rather than submit.

As time slips away and the execution hour nears, the silent priest among them reveals himself to be none other than Libert, the famed Austrian spy in disguise. For the sake of 10,000 Austrian soldiers whose lives depend on his safe return, he begs Mary Ann to make the ultimate sacrifice—not for herself, nor for Paul, but for her country. Broken in spirit but resolved, Mary Ann consents.

Through Libert’s intelligence, Austrian forces reclaim Lemberg at dawn. Among them is Paul (now a captain) leading the victorious troops. He finds Mary Ann and, in a rush of joy, embraces her, not yet seeing the haunted, otherworldly look in her eyes.

But into their reunion stumbles the dying Nika, wounded in the retreat. In his final breath, he declares to Paul that Mary Ann was unfaithful. Shocked and wounded, Paul pulls away. Mary Ann remains silent, accepting his judgment, her sacrifice too private and painful to explain.

But Libert steps forward, unable to let her heroism go unrecognized. With reverence, he leads her to a balcony overlooking the gathered Austrian troops. A general delivers a solemn tribute, and the army kneels before her in honor. Among them are Otto Krueger, the stern commandant; the Countess, a noblewoman moved by Mary Ann’s valor; and the Count, who bows with the others.

Only Paul remains standing, frozen with guilt and awe. Slowly, humbly, he drops to his knees.

Mary Ann’s eyes brim with tears (not of sorrow, but peace) as she reaches out to the man she loves. Her faith is restored.

== Cast ==
- Norma Talmadge as Mary Ann Wagner
- Gilbert Roland as Paul Hartman
- Arnold Kent as Nika Turgenov
- Boris de Fast as Passerby
- Michael Vavitch as Father Roche
- Gustav von Seyffertitz as Otto Krueger
- Gladys Brockwell as Countess
- Nicholas Soussanin as Count

== Music ==
The film featured a theme song entitled “Poem” which was composed by Zdenko Fibich. This song is better known under its 1933 title "My Moonlight Madonna" in which the melody was slightly altered to fit the newly written lyrics. Although the song "Woman Disputed (I Love You)" (which was written by Bernie Grossman and Edward Ward) was published as the theme song of the film it is not featured at all on the recorded synchronized soundtrack released with the film. The orchestra featured on the soundtrack was directed by Hugo Riesenfeld with Josef Pasternack acting as assistant director.

== Preservation ==
The film is extant at the Library of Congress film archive, and has been exhibited for audiences in recent years. A full restoration of the film with the original synchronized musical score from the original Vitaphone discs was released by the Vitaphone Soundtrack Project in 2025 on YouTube.

== See also ==
- List of early sound feature films (1926–1929)
