= The Dealer from Amsterdam =

1925 film

- German: Der Trödler von Amsterdam
- Directed by: Victor Janson
- Written by: Fanny Carlsen; Alfred Schirokauer (story)
- Starring: Werner Krauss; Hilde Hildebrand; Harry Hardt
- Cinematography: Georg Muschner
- Music by: Bruno Schulz
- Production company: Defa-Deutsche Fox
- Distributed by: Defa-Deutsche Fox
- Release date: 9 November 1925
- Running time: 93 minutes
- Country: Germany
- Languages: Silent; German intertitles

The Dealer from Amsterdam (German: Der Trödler von Amsterdam) is a 1925 German silent drama film directed by Victor Janson and starring Werner Krauss, Hilde Hildebrand and Harry Hardt. It was made by the German subsidiary of the Fox Film Company. The film's sets were designed by the art directors Andrej Andrejew and Gustav A. Knauer.

== Cast ==
- Werner Krauss as Arent Bergh
- Hilde Hildebrand as Susi
- Alf Blütecher as Oliver Morrisson
- Harry Hardt as Ernst
- Diomira Jacobini as Annette Bergh
- Hans Mierendorff
- Anton Pointner as Gilbert

== Bibliography ==
- Saunders, Thomas J. Hollywood in Berlin: American Cinema and Weimar Germany. University of California Press, 2023.
