= The Secret Courier =

1928 film

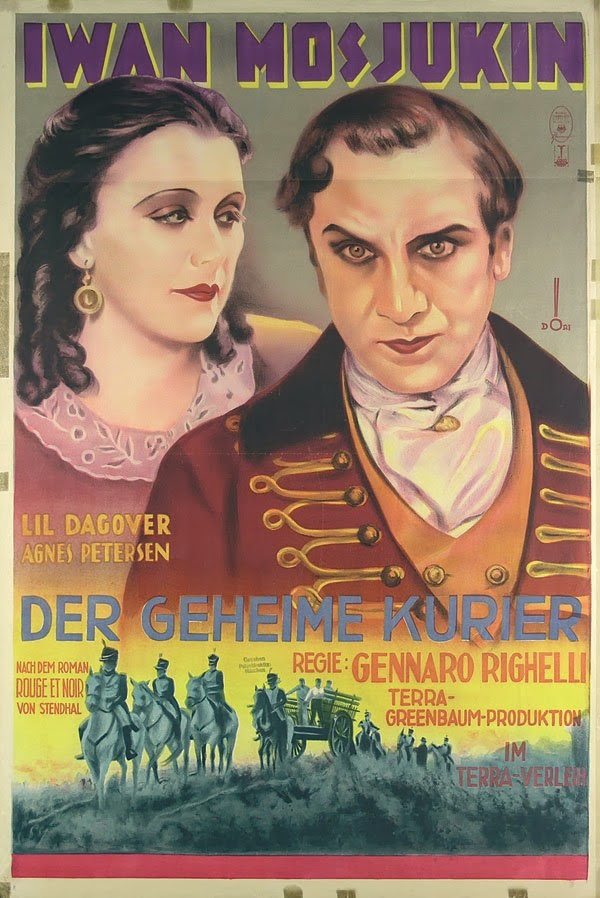
- Directed by: Gennaro Righelli
- Written by: Curt J. Braun; Walter Jonas; Stendhal (novel The Red and the Black)
- Produced by: Marcel Hellman; Herman Millakowsky
- Starring: Lil Dagover; Ivan Mozzhukhin; Agnes Petersen
- Cinematography: Friedrich Weinmann
- Music by: Giuseppe Becce
- Production company: Greenbaum-Film
- Distributed by: Terra Film
- Release date: 25 October 1928
- Running time: 116 minutes
- Country: Germany
- Languages: Silent; German intertitles

The Secret Courier (German: Der geheime Kurier) is a 1928 German silent adventure film directed by Gennaro Righelli and starring Lil Dagover, Ivan Mozzhukhin and Agnes Petersen. It is based on the classic novel The Red and the Black by Stendhal, which Righelli later remade as a sound film The Courier of the King in 1947. The film was shot at the Terra Studios in Berlin. The film's art direction was by Otto Erdmann and Hans Sohnle.

== Cast ==
- Lil Dagover as Mme. Thérèse de Renal
- Ivan Mozzhukhin as Julien Sorel
- Agnes Petersen as Mathilde de la Môle
- Félix de Pomés as Norbert de la Môle
- Valeria Blanka as Innkeeper's Daughter
- Hubert von Meyerinck as Duc d'Orléans
- José Davert as Mayor Rénal
- Jean Dax as Marquis de la Môle
- Dillo Lombardi as Abbé

== Bibliography ==
- Hans-Michael Bock and Tim Bergfelder. The Concise Cinegraph: An Encyclopedia of German Cinema. Berghahn Books, 2009.
