= For Men Only (1938 film) =

1938 film

- Directed by: Guido Brignone
- Written by: Luciano Doria; Aldo Vergano; Nino Giannini
- Starring: Antonio Gandusio; Carlo Buti; Paola Barbara
- Cinematography: Carlo Montuori
- Edited by: Giuseppe Fatigati
- Music by: Ulisse Siciliani
- Production companies: Romulus Film; Lupa Film
- Distributed by: Consorzio Italiano Film
- Release date: 16 December 1938
- Running time: 80 minutes
- Country: Italy
- Language: Italian

For Men Only (Italian:Per uomini soli) is a 1938 Italian "white-telephones" comedy film directed by Guido Brignone and starring Antonio Gandusio, Carlo Buti and Paola Barbara.

The film's sets were designed by Piero Filippone. It was made at Cinecittà in Rome.

== Cast ==
- Antonio Gandusio as Barnaba Tamburini
- Carlo Buti as Carlo Lupoli
- Paola Barbara as Cecchina Spolveri
- Fanny Marchiò as Herta Gerbins, l'attrice
- Guido Riccioli as Ulisse Lupoli
- Loris Gizzi as Ladislao Paszkowsky, il regista
- Pina Renzi as Miss Betty Thompson
- Virgilio Riento as Pasquale Pappalardo
- Giulio Alfieri as Natalino Sperenza
- Nino Altieri
- Oreste Bilancia
- Enzo Biliotti
- Pasquale Braucci
- Remo Brignardelli
- Giorgio Capecchi
- Giovanni Conforti
- Luigi Erminio D'Olivo
- Bianca Della Corte
- Alba Ferrarotti
- Giuseppe Gambardella
- Renato Malavasi
- Nicola Maldacea
- Thea Martinero
- Bebi Nucci
- Massimo Pianforini
- Vittorio Ripamonti
- Angelini Vittorio

== Bibliography ==
- Stefano Masi & Enrico Lancia. Les séductrices du cinéma italien. Gremese Editore, 1997.
