= Alberto Collo =

Italian actor (1883–1955)

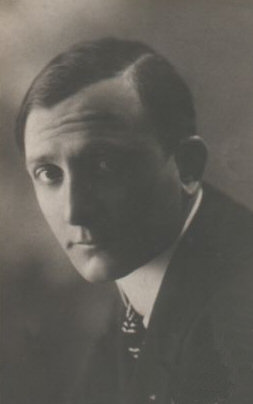
- Alberto Collo (1923)
- Born: 6 May 1883; Turin, Piedmont; Italy
- Died: 7 May 1955 (aged 72); Turin, Piedmont; Italy
- Occupation: Actor
- Years active: 1912-1955 (film)

Alberto Collo (6 May 1883 – 7 May 1955) was an Italian actor who appeared in more than a hundred and thirty films during his career, mostly during the silent era. During the 1910s he starred in several films directed by Baldassarre Negroni.

== Selected filmography ==
- Broken Idol (1913)
- The Lady of the Camellias (1915)
- The Shadow of Her Past (1915)
- Tortured Soul (1919)
- Saetta Learns to Live (1924)
- Maciste's American Nephew (1924)
- Pleasure Train (1924)
- Maciste in the Lion's Cage (1926)
- Villafranca (1934)
- Shipwrecked (1939)
- William Tell (1949)
- The Crossroads (1951)

== Bibliography ==
- Moliterno, Gino. Historical Dictionary of Italian Cinema. Scarecrow Press, 2008.
