= Domenico Gambino =

Italian actor (1890–1968)

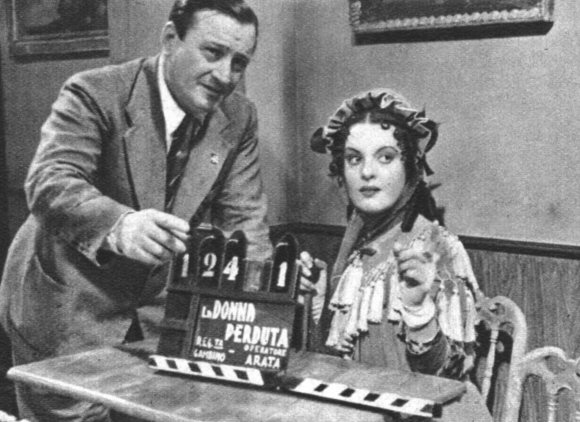
- Gambino and Elli Parvo in the set of La donna perduta (1940)
- Born: Domenico Maria Gambino; 17 May 1890; Turin, Piedmont; Italy
- Died: 17 April 1968 (aged 77); Rome, Lazio; Italy
- Occupations: Actor; Screenwriter; Director
- Years active: 1912–1954 (film)

Domenico Gambino (17 May 1890 – 17 April 1968) was an Italian actor, screenwriter and film director.

Gambino played Saetta, one of the rival strongman heroes to Maciste. Saetta had his own series of films during the early 1920s. He directed the 1931 German film A Storm Over Zakopane.

== Selected filmography ==
=== Actor ===
- Cabiria (1914)
- Saetta Saves the Queen (1920)
- Chief Saetta (1924)
- Emperor Maciste (1924)
- Saetta Learns to Live (1924)
- Thieves (1928)
- I Lost My Heart on a Bus (1929)
- A Storm Over Zakopane (1931)
- All is at Stake (1932)
- His Young Wife (1945)

=== Director ===
- The Last Performance of the Circus Wolfson (1928)
- Affair at the Grand Hotel (1929)
- A Storm Over Zakopane (1931)
- Battles in the Shadow (1938)
- The Secret of Villa Paradiso (1940)
- The Black Panther (1942)
- Return to Naples (1949)

=== Screenwriter ===
- Tragic Serenade (1951)

== Bibliography ==
- Munich, Adrienne. Fashion in Film. Indiana University Press, 2011.
- Skaff, Sheila. The Law of the Looking Glass: Cinema in Poland, 1896-1939. Ohio University Press, 2008.
