= Ignazio Lupi =

Italian actor and film director

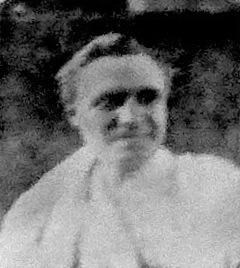
- 1914
- Born: 11 December 1867; Rome, Lazio; Italy
- Died: 14 December 1942 (aged 75); Rome, Lazio; Italy
- Occupation: Actor
- Years active: 1912–1925 (film)

Ignazio Lupi (1867–1942) was an Italian actor and film director. Lupi appeared in more than eighty films, including several historical epics such as Cabiria (1914).

== Selected filmography ==
- Quo Vadis (1913)
- Antony and Cleopatra (1913)
- Cabiria (1914)
- The Rose of Granada (1916)
- The Sheep (1920)
- But It Isn't Serious (1921)
- Under the Snow (1922)
- The Fiery Cavalcade (1925)

== Bibliography ==
- Cowie, Peter (1969). Seventy Years of Cinema. A.S. Barnes.
