= The Voyage (1921 film) =

1921 film

- Maria Jacobini and Carlo Benetti
- Directed by: Gennaro Righelli
- Written by: Adriano Piacitelli; Luigi Pirandello (novel); Gennaro Righelli
- Starring: Maria Jacobini; Carlo Benetti
- Production company: Fert Film
- Distributed by: Fert Film
- Release date: November 1921
- Running time: 64 minutes
- Country: Italy
- Languages: Silent; Italian intertitles

The Voyage (Italian: Il viaggio) is a 1921 Italian silent drama film directed by Gennaro Righelli and starring Maria Jacobini and Carlo Benetti. It is an adaptation of the novel of the same title by Luigi Pirandello. It was made by the Turin-based Fert Film.

== Cast ==
- Carlo Benetti
- Alfonso Cassini
- Maria Jacobini
- Andrea Rinaldi

== Bibliography ==
- Mancini, Elaine. Struggles of the Italian Film Industry During Fascism, 1930-1935. UMI Research Press, 1985.
