= Under the Snow =

1922 film

- Directed by: Gennaro Righelli
- Written by: Alessandro De Stefani; Luciano Doria
- Produced by: Gennaro Righelli
- Starring: Maria Jacobini; Alberto Capozzi; Ignazio Lupi
- Production company: E.D.A.
- Distributed by: Società Anonima Stefano Pittaluga
- Release date: 31 March 1922
- Running time: 90 minutes
- Country: Italy
- Languages: Silent; Italian intertitles

Under the Snow (Italian: La casa sotto la neve) is a 1922 Italian silent drama film directed by Gennaro Righelli and starring Maria Jacobini, Alberto Capozzi and Ignazio Lupi.

== Cast ==
- Maria Jacobini as Maria
- Alberto Capozzi as Dr. Giorgio Salviati
- Ignazio Lupi as Duca Roberto Rovere
- Enrico Kanti as Peter Norton
- Marcella Sabbatini as Grazia Rovere

== Bibliography ==
- Lancia, Enrico. Dizionario del cinema italiano : testi e strumenti per la scuola e l'università. Gli artisti : Vol. 3, Gli attori dal 1930 ai giorni nostri : T. 1. A - L, Volume 1. Gremese Editore, 2003.
