= Guglielmo Zorzi =

Italian screenwriter and film director

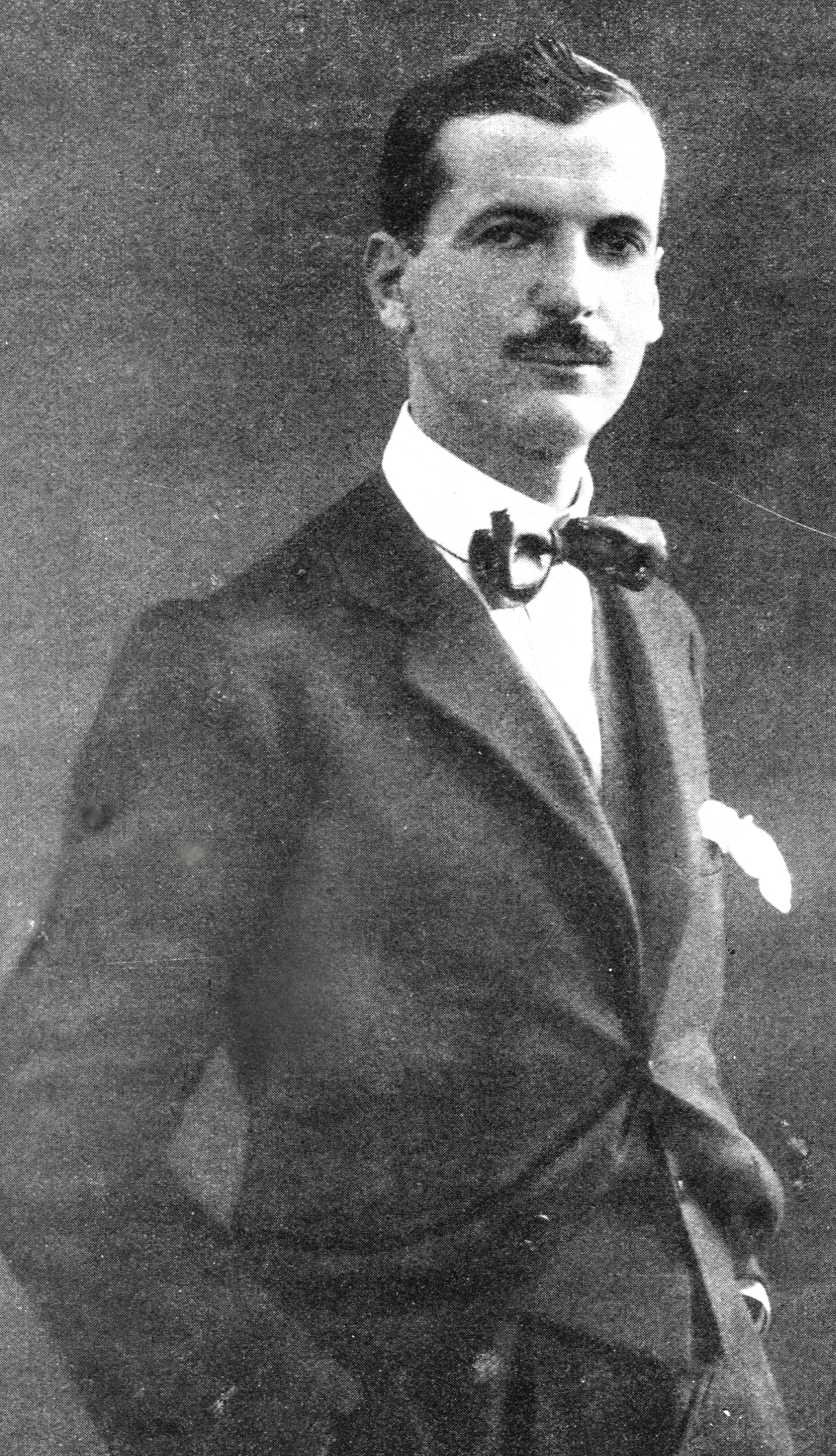
- Zorzi in 1914.
- Born: 31 January 1879; Bologna, Italy
- Died: 4 October 1967 (aged 88); Bologna, Italy
- Occupations: Writer, director
- Years active: 1913–1971 (film)

Guglielmo Zorzi (1879–1967) was an Italian screenwriter and film director.

== Selected filmography ==
=== Director ===
- The Redemption (1924)
- The Closed Mouth (1925)
- The Golden Vein (1928)

=== Screenwriter ===
- Blue Blood (1914)
- The Closed Mouth (1925)
- The Lady in White (1938)
- The Iron Crown (1941)
- Margaret of Cortona (1950)

== Bibliography ==
- Vacche, Angela Dalle. Diva: Defiance and Passion in Early Italian Cinema. University of Texas Press, 2008.
