= Oreste Bilancia =

Italian actor (1881–1945)

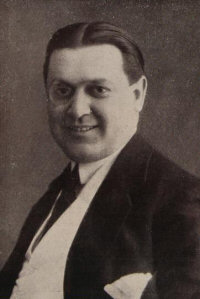
- Born: 24 September 1881; Catania, Sicily, Italy
- Died: 31 October 1945 (aged 64); Rome, Italy
- Occupation: actor
- Years active: 1915—1944

Oreste Bilancia (24 September 1881 – 31 October 1945) was an Italian film actor.

Born in Catania, Sicily, he was a star of Italian films during the silent era. He also worked during the 1920s in Weimar Germany, which had the then largest European film industry of the era. He appeared in 134 films between 1915 and his death in 1945.

== Selected filmography ==
- Lucciola (1917)
- Il trono e la seggiola (1918)
- Goodbye Youth (1918)
- Hedda Gabler (1920)
- Red Love (1921)
- Chief Saetta (1924)
- Pleasure Train (1924)
- Maciste's American Nephew (1924)
- The Girl with a Patron (1925)
- One Minute to Twelve (1925)
- Letters Which Never Reached Him (1925)
- Women You Rarely Greet (1925)
- Nick, King of the Chauffeurs (1925)
- The Flight in the Night (1926)
- One Does Not Play with Love (1926)
- The Pink Diamond (1926)
- The Queen of the Baths (1926)
- Department Store Princess (1926)
- The Bank Crash of Unter den Linden (1926)
- The White Slave (1927)
- A Serious Case (1927)
- When the Young Wine Blossoms (1927)
- The Eighteen Year Old (1927)
- The Csardas Princess (1927)
- Floretta and Patapon (1927)
- Folly of Love (1928)
- The Case of Prosecutor M (1928)
- Two Red Roses (1928)
- Only a Viennese Woman Kisses Like That (1928)
- The Last Performance of the Circus Wolfson (1928)
- Suzy Saxophone (1928)
- The Story of a Little Parisian (1928)
- Pawns of Passion (1928)
- Love's Masquerade (1928)
- Villa Falconieri (1928)
- Tempo! Tempo! (1929)
- The Hero of Every Girl's Dream (1929)
- The Girl with the Whip (1929)
- The Doctor's Secret (1931)
- Queen of the Night (1931)
- Paradise (1932)
- Five to Nil (1932)
- Zaganella and the Cavalier (1932)
- Sailor's Song (1932)
- The Gift of the Morning (1932)
- The Wedding March (1934)
- A Woman Between Two Worlds (1936)
- Bayonet (1936)
- The Ambassador (1936)
- Thirty Seconds of Love (1936)
- Hands Off Me! (1937)
- For Men Only (1938)
- Red Tavern (1940)
- The Palace on the River (1940)
- Saint John, the Beheaded (1940)
- The King's Jester (1941)
- Four Steps in the Clouds (1942)
- Two Hearts Among the Beasts (1943)
