= Za La Mort =

Fictional character who featured in a number of Italian films

Za La Mort (also written as Za-La-Mort) is a fictional character who featured in a number of Italian films. Along with characters such as Maciste and Saetta, he was a pulp hero of the silent era. Za La Mort was noted as a gentleman thief with an essentially honourable heart who often tackles those more villainous than himself. The character resembles other well-meaning criminals, particularly Arsène Lupin and Raffles.

He was played by the actor Emilio Ghione who became closely identified with the role. The original series began with the 1914 film Nelly. This was a commercial success, and a sequel Za La Mort was released in 1915 introducing a female sidekick Za La Vie (played by Kally Sambucini). The series continued until 1924 with Ghione directing as well as acting in the films. Ghione based the series on the French crime films by Louis Feuillade and Victorin Jasset.

In 1947, the director Raffaello Matarazzo made an unsuccessful attempt to revive the character in The Opium Den, with the role now played by the former star's son Emilio Ghione Jr.

== Bibliography ==
- Moliterno, Gino. The A to Z of Italian Cinema. Scarecrow Press, 2009.
