= Cainà =

1922 film

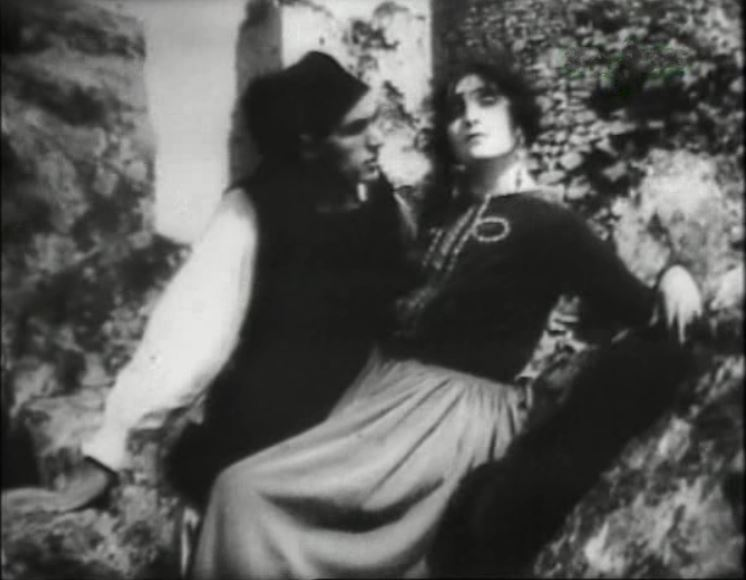
- Directed by: Gennaro Righelli
- Written by: Maria Jacobini; Adriano Piacitelli; Gennaro Righelli
- Starring: Maria Jacobini; Carlo Benetti; Ida Carloni Talli
- Cinematography: Tullio Chiarini
- Production company: Fert Film
- Release date: 2 June 1922
- Running time: 50 minutes
- Country: Italy
- Languages: Silent; Italian intertitles

Cainà is a 1922 Italian silent drama film directed by Gennaro Righelli and starring Maria Jacobini, Carlo Benetti and Ida Carloni Talli. It was shot at the Fert Studios in Turin.

== Cast ==
- Maria Jacobini as Cainà
- Carlo Benetti as Pietro
- Ida Carloni Talli as La madre
- Eugenio Duse
- Sig. Carmi as Giannatola

== Bibliography ==
- Mattei, Jean-Pierre. La Corse & le cinéma: première époque, 1897-1929 : le muet. A. Piazzola, 1996.
- Olla, Gianni. Dai Lumière a Sonetàula: 109 anni di film, documentari, fiction e inchieste televisive sulla Sardegna. CUEC, 2008.
