= Za La Mort (film) =

1924 German-Italian silent action film

- Directed by: Emilio Ghione
- Written by: Emilio Ghione
- Produced by: Fern Andra
- Starring: Fern Andra; Emilio Ghione; Magnus Stifter
- Cinematography: Eugen Hamm; Franz Stein
- Production companies: Fern Andra-Film; National Film
- Distributed by: National Film
- Release date: 1 May 1924
- Countries: Germany; Italy
- Languages: Silent; German intertitles

Za La Mort (German: Der Traum der Zalavie, Italian: Il sogno di Za la Vie) is a 1924 German-Italian silent action film directed by Emilio Ghione and starring Ghione, Fern Andra and Magnus Stifter. It is part of a series of silent films featuring the pulp hero Za La Mort.

== Cast ==
- Fern Andra as Schauspielerin Perla Cristal / Prinzessin Perla
- Emilio Ghione as Maler Prof. Antonio Butty / Zalamort
- Magnus Stifter as Bildhauer Prof. Rudens / König Jaromir der Finstere
- Henry Sze as Geheimsekretär Hatsuma
- Kally Sambucini as Maja / Zalavie
- Ernst Rückert as Der verbannte Prinz
- Robert Scholz

== Bibliography ==
- Burke, Frank. A Companion to Italian Cinema. John Wiley & Sons, 2017.
