= Diomira Jacobini =

Italian actress (1899–1959)

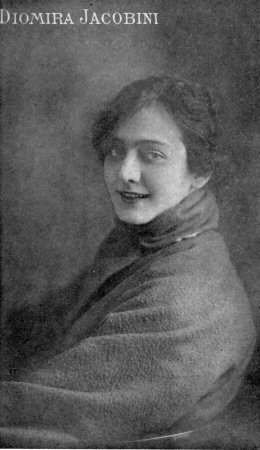
- Born: 25 May 1899; Rome, Lazio, Italy
- Died: 13 September 1959 (aged 60); Rome, Lazio, Italy
- Occupation: Actress
- Years active: 1912–1933 (film)

Diomira Jacobini (25 May 1899 – 13 September 1959) was an Italian film actress of the silent era. She was the younger sister of actress Maria Jacobini.

== Selected filmography ==
- The Shadow of Her Past (1915)
- The Rose of Granada (1916)
- The House of Pulcini (1924)
- Maciste's American Nephew (1924)
- The Dealer from Amsterdam (1925)
- The Alternative Bride (1925)
- The Last Night (1928)
- Don Manuel, the Bandit (1929)
- The Last Adventure (1932)

== Bibliography ==
- Goble, Alan. The Complete Index to Literary Sources in Film. Walter de Gruyter, 1999.
