= Red Love (1921 film) =

1921 film directed by Gennaro Righelli

- Directed by: Gennaro Righelli
- Written by: Luciano Doria; Nunzio Malasomma; Gennaro Righelli
- Based on: Militona by Théophile Gautier
- Starring: Maria Jacobini; Amleto Novelli; Arnold Kent
- Cinematography: Tullio Chiarini
- Production company: Fert Film
- Distributed by: Fert Film
- Release date: June 1921
- Running time: 69 minutes
- Country: Italy
- Languages: Silent; Italian intertitles

Red Love (Italian: Amore rosso) is a 1921 Italian silent drama film directed by Gennaro Righelli and starring Maria Jacobini, Amleto Novelli and Arnold Kent. It was shot at the Fert Studios in Turin.

== Cast ==
- Maria Jacobini as Juanita, la manola
- Amleto Novelli as l'espada Barrena
- Arnold Kent as don Alvaro de San Rosario
- Oreste Bilancia as padre di Isabella
- Orietta Claudi as Isabella de los Rios
- Ida Carloni Talli as la Tia
- Alfonso Cassini
- Silvio Orsini

== Bibliography ==
- Dalle Vacche, Angela. Diva: Defiance and Passion in Early Italian Cinema. University of Texas Press, 2008.
- Goble, Alan. The Complete Index to Literary Sources in Film. Walter de Gruyter, 1999.
