= Chief Saetta =

1924 film

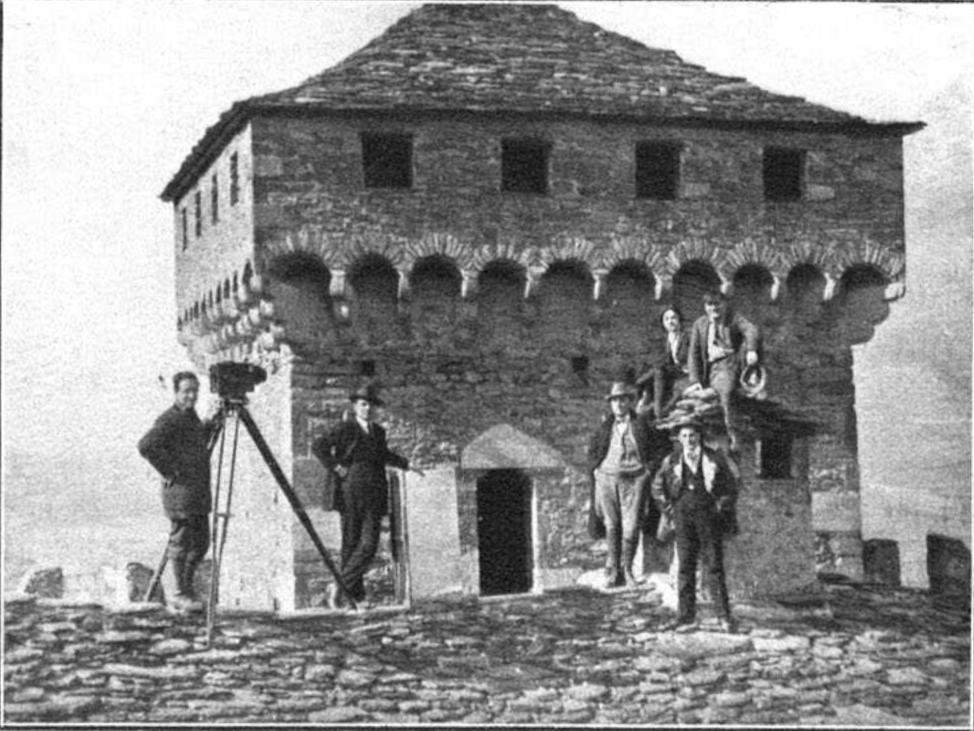
- Behind the scenes at Fénis Castle.
- Directed by: Eugenio Perego
- Written by: Ermanno Geymonat
- Produced by: Stefano Pittaluga
- Starring: Domenico Gambino; Pauline Polaire; Oreste Bilancia
- Cinematography: Sergio Goddio
- Production company: Fert Film
- Distributed by: Societa Anonima Stefano Pittaluga
- Release date: December 1924
- Country: Italy
- Languages: Silent; Italian intertitles

Chief Saetta (Italian: Caporal Saetta) is a 1924 Italian silent adventure film directed by Eugenio Perego and starring Domenico Gambino and Pauline Polaire. It was part of a series featuring Gambino as the strongman Saetta. Produced by Fert Film of Turin, it still exists in film archives.

== Cast ==
- Liliana Ardea as Saetta's sister
- Augusto Bandini as Crapotti
- Oreste Bilancia as Albert
- Domenico Gambino as Saetta
- Felice Minotti
- Pauline Polaire as Marquise Laurette
- Franz Sala as Jaquito
- Armando Pouget as Colonel
- Domenico Serra

Character names are taken from the French language section of Pittaluga's magazine, and may not be the same as the original Italian names.

== Production ==
Caporal Saetta was partially shot on location in Aosta Valley, with behind the scenes photographs placing the crew at Fénis Castle.

== Bibliography ==
- Jacqueline Reich. The Maciste Films of Italian Silent Cinema. Indiana University Press, 2015.
