= María Paredes (film editor) =

Spanish film editor

- Born: María Paredes Martín
- Occupation: Film editor
- Years active: 1937–1950

María Paredes (sometimes credited as Maruja Paredes) was a Spanish film editor active from the 1930s through the 1950s.

== Selected filmography ==
- I'm Not Mata Hari (1950)
- Audiencia pública (1946)
- El huésped del sevillano (1940)
- Nuestro culpable (1938)
