= Pleasure Train (film) =

1924 film

- Directed by: Luciano Doria
- Written by: Maurice Hennequin (play)
- Produced by: Stefano Pittaluga
- Starring: Oreste Bilancia; Pauline Polaire
- Cinematography: Anchise Brizzi
- Production company: Fert Film
- Distributed by: Fert Film
- Release date: November 1924
- Country: Italy
- Languages: Silent; Italian intertitles

Pleasure Train (Italian: Treno di piacere) is a 1924 Italian silent film directed by Luciano Doria and starring Oreste Bilancia and Pauline Polaire. The film was shot by the Turin-based Fert Film company. It still exists in archives.

== Cast ==
- Augusto Bandini
- Alex Bernard
- Oreste Bilancia
- Alberto Collo
- Petronilla Garis
- Alberto Pasquali
- Pauline Polaire
- Armand Pouget
- Lidia Quaranta
- Franz Sala
- Elena Sangro
- Domenico Serra

== Bibliography ==
- Jacqueline Reich. The Maciste Films of Italian Silent Cinema. Indiana University Press, 2015.
