= Maciste's American Nephew =

1924 film

- Directed by: Eleuterio Rodolfi
- Written by: Giovacchino Forzano
- Produced by: Stefano Pittaluga
- Starring: Bartolomeo Pagano; Diomira Jacobini; Alberto Collo
- Cinematography: Anchise Brizzi; Sergio Goddio
- Production company: Fert Film
- Distributed by: Societa Anonima Stefano Pittaluga
- Release date: March 1924
- Country: Italy
- Languages: Silent; Italian intertitles

Maciste's American Nephew (Italian: Maciste e il nipote d'America) is a 1924 Italian silent adventure film directed by Eleuterio Rodolfi and starring Bartolomeo Pagano, Diomira Jacobini and Alberto Collo. It was part of the long-running Maciste series of films.

== Cast ==
- Bartolomeo Pagano as Maciste
- Diomira Jacobini
- Alberto Collo
- Augusto Bandini
- Oreste Bilancia
- Mercedes Brignone
- Pauline Polaire

== Bibliography ==
- Roy Kinnard & Tony Crnkovich. Italian Sword and Sandal Films, 1908–1990. McFarland, 2017.
