= Ida Carloni Talli =

Italian actress (1860–1940)

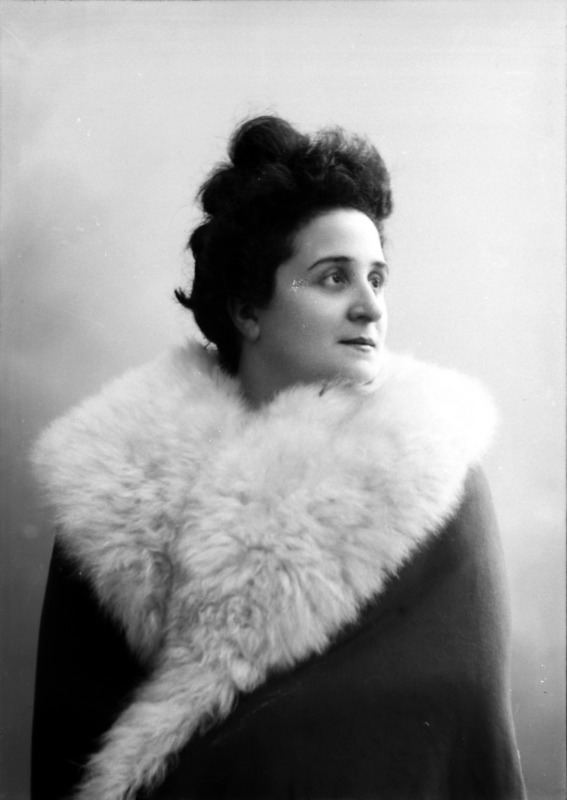
- Born: 31 January 1860; Rome, Papal States
- Died: 23 April 1940 (aged 80); Milan, Italy
- Occupation: Actress
- Years active: 1912–1924

Ida Carloni Talli (31 January 1860 – 23 April 1940) was an Italian film actress of the silent era. She appeared in 92 films between 1912 and 1924. She was born Rome and died in Milan. She made her debut as a stage actress in 1887.

== Selected filmography ==
- Antony and Cleopatra (1913)
- Quo Vadis (1913)
- The Lady of the Camellias (1915)
- The Shadow of Her Past (1915)
- I Topi Grigi, starring Emilio Ghione
- The Sea of Naples (1919)
- Tortured Soul (1919)
- Red Love (1921)
- The Prey (1921)
- Cainà (1922)
- The White Sister (1923)
- The Betrothed (1923)
- Consuelita (1925)
