= Kally Sambucini =

Italian film actress

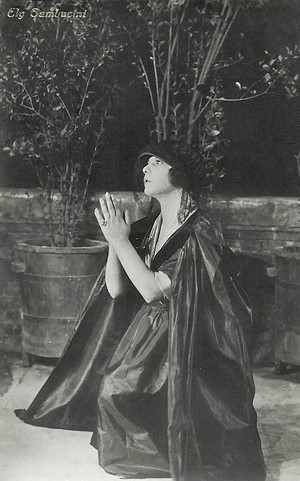
- Born: 18 August 1892; Rome, Lazio; Italy
- Died: 27 December 1969 (aged 77); Rome, Lazio; Italy
- Other name: Calliope Sambucini
- Occupation: Actress
- Years active: 1915–1942 (film)

Kally Sambucini (1892–1969) was an Italian film actress, known for playing the female sidekick Za La Vie in the Za La Mort series of action films alongside Emilio Ghione.

== Selected filmography ==
- The Rose of Granada (1916)
- Za La Mort (1924)
- Latest Night News (1924)
