= Alberto Capozzi =

Italian actor (1886–1945)

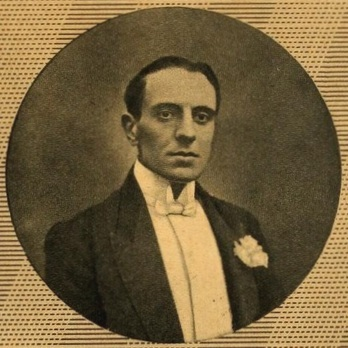
- Born: 8 July 1886; Genoa, Italy
- Died: 27 June 1945 (aged 58); Rome, Italy
- Occupation: Actor
- Years active: 1908-1945

Alberto Capozzi (8 July 1886 – 27 June 1945) was an Italian film actor. He appeared in more than 130 films between 1908 and 1945.

== Selected filmography ==
- The Two Sergeants (1913)
- The Open Door ( 1914 film) (La porta aperta)
- The Sea of Naples (1919)
- The Mysterious Princess (1920)
- A Vanished World (1922)
- Under the Snow (1922)
- Marco Visconti (1941)
- The Jester's Supper (1942)
- The Woman of Sin (1942)
- No Turning Back (1945)
