= Luciano Doria =

- Born: 30 November 1891; Rome, Lazio, Italy
- Occupations: Writer, Producer, Director
- Years active: 1918-1960 (film)

Luciano Doria (born 1891) was an Italian screenwriter, producer and film director.

== Selected filmography ==
- Red Love (1921)
- Under the Snow (1922)
- Pleasure Train (1924)
- Beatrice Cenci (1926)
- The Golden Vein (1928)
- Goodbye Youth (1928)
- Kif Tebbi (1928)
- For Men Only (1938)
- The Fornaretto of Venice (1939)
- We Were Seven Sisters (1939)
- The Carnival of Venice (1939)
- Rossini (1942)
- The Opium Den (1947)
- The Loves of Hercules (1960)

== Bibliography ==
- Goble, Alan. The Complete Index to Literary Sources in Film. Walter de Gruyter, 1999.
