= Carlo Benetti =

Italian actor (1885–1949)

- Born: 4 July 1885; Florence, Tuscany, Italy
- Died: 4 June 1949 (aged 63); Rome, Lazio, Italy
- Occupations: Actor; Production Manager
- Years active: 1912–1946 (film)

Carlo Benetti (1885–1949) was an Italian film actor of the silent era. During the sound era he worked as production manager on a number of films.

== Selected filmography ==
- Assunta Spina (1915)
- The Lady of the Camellias (1915)
- The Blind Woman of Sorrento (1916)
- Odette (1916)
- The Voyage (1921)
- Cainà (1922)
- The Closed Mouth (1925)
- The Golden Vein (1928)
- Kif Tebbi (1928)

== Bibliography ==
- Goble, Alan. The Complete Index to Literary Sources in Film. Walter de Gruyter, 1999.
