= Hesperia (actress) =

Italian actress (1885–1959)

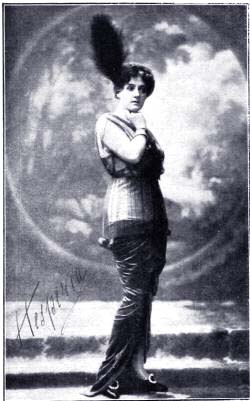
- Born: 9 July 1885; Bertinoro, Forlì-Cesena, Kingdom of Italy
- Died: 30 May 1959 (aged 73); Rome, Italy
- Occupation: Actor
- Years active: 1912–1938

Hesperia (born Olga Mambelli; 9 July 1885 – 30 May 1959) was an Italian actress. She appeared in more than sixty films and shorts from 1912 to 1938. She was married to the director Baldassarre Negroni.

== Selected filmography ==
Year	Title	Role	Notes
1938	Pride		
1923	Il velo della colpa		
1923	L'ora terribile		
1923	La locanda delle ombre		
1923	La duchessa Mistero		
1922	La belle Madame Hebért		
1921	Il figlio di Madame Sans Gêne		
1920	L'altro pericolo		
1920	Chimere		
1919	Divorziamo		
1919	Bimbi lontani		
1919	La signora senza pace		
1919	Vertigine		
1919	La fibra del dolore		
1918	Madame Flirt		
1918	Il volto del passato		
1918	La principessa di Bagdad		
1917	La donna abbandonata		
1917	La via della luce		
1917	L'aigrette		
1917	La cuccagna		
1917	Gli onori della guerra		
1917	La donna di cuori		
1916	Il potere sovrano		
1916	Jou-Jou		
1916	Anime buie		
1916	Il mistero di una notte di primavera		
1916	La morsa		
1916	A guardia di Sua Maestà		
1915	Marcella		
1915	Rugiada di sangue		
1915	La signora delle camelie (The Lady of the Camellias)		
1915	L'ereditiera		
1915	La via dolorosa		
1915	L'agguato		
1914	Dopo il veglione		
1914	Vizio atavico		
1914	The Last Battle		
1914	L'arma del vile		
1913	Paying the Price		
1913	When a Woman Wills		
1913	Between Savage and Tiger		
