= Gennaro Righelli =

Italian film director

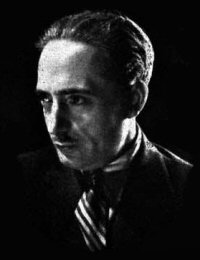
- Born: 12 December 1886; Salerno, Italy
- Died: 6 January 1949 (aged 62); Rome, Italy
- Occupations: Film director, screenwriter
- Years active: 1910–1947
- Notable work: The Song of Love
- Spouse: Maria Jacobini (m. 1925; died 1944)

Signature
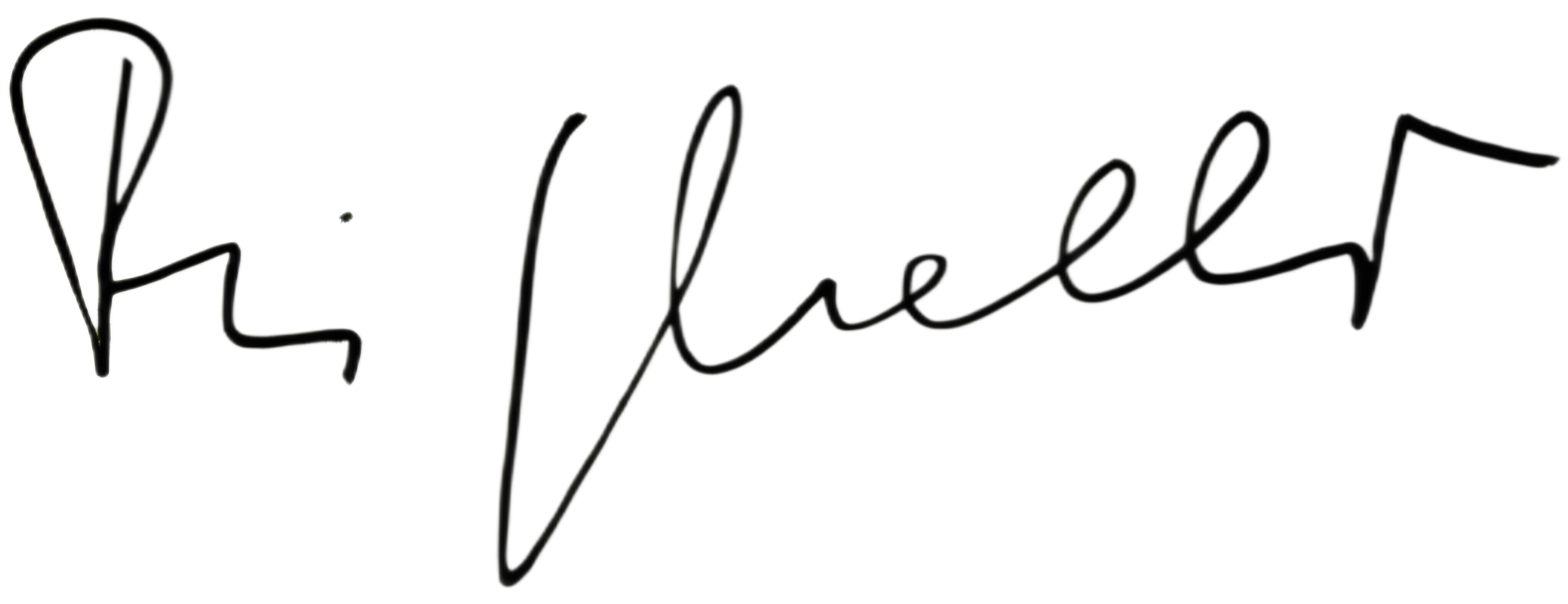

Gennaro Righelli (12 December 1886 – 6 January 1949) was an Italian film director, screenwriter and actor. He directed more than 110 films in Italy and Germany between 1910 and 1947. In 1930, he directed the first Italian sound film, The Song of Love. He was married to the film star Maria Jacobini, whom he frequently cast in his films.

== Biography ==
=== Early career ===
Salvatore Gennaro Righelli was born in Salerno on 12 December 1886 to the Neapolitan actor Angelo Righelli and Maria Galassi. After working as a stage actor in his youth, he started his career at the production company Cines, initially as a screenwriter and then as a director. His debut film was La fidanzata di Messina (1911), in which he played the lead role. He then moved to Vesuvio Films, where he directed several films with his wife, Maria Mauro, until 1913. In 1916, he began working for Tiber Film, before moving to Fert in 1920. Righelli drew inspiration for most of his films from great works of literature. Examples include Il Decamerone (1912), inspired by Giovanni Boccaccio's collection of short stories The Decameron, and The Voyage (1921), based on Luigi Pirandello's novel of the same title.

=== In Germany ===
Due to the crisis that affected the Italian film industry in the 1920s, Righelli moved to Germany, where he worked as a director from 1923 to 1929. Initially hired by Berlin producer Jakob Karol, he then founded the film company Maria Jacobini-Film GmbH with Maria Jacobini, whom he married in 1925. During his time in Germany, Righelli directed over fifteen films, including La Boheme (1923) and Rudderless (1924), which are widely considered among the finest works of his career and enjoyed success throughout Europe.

=== Back in Italy ===
Back in Italy, Righelli was hired by Stefano Pittaluga, the head of Cines, to direct the first Italian sound film, The Song of Love (1930), starring Dria Paola, Isa Pola, and Elio Steiner. Based on Luigi Pirandello's novella In silenzio, the film was a huge success with critics and audiences alike, and was distributed in France and Germany.

Following the comedy Patatrac (1931) starring Armando Falconi, and the subsequent L'aria del continente (1935) – based on a play by Nino Martoglio – starring Angelo Musco. In 1935, he directed with Eduardo and Peppino De Filippo in the comedy Quei due, a farce based on Eduardo's one-act play Sik Sik l'artefice magico. Righelli also directed the sentimental comedies Mr. Desire (1933) and They've Kidnapped a Man (1938), starring Vittorio De Sica. After the war, he directed Down with Misery (1945) and Peddlin' in Society (1946). Despite their evidently populist tone, these films are marked by neorealist traits in their depiction of the hardships and economic difficulties faced by the country in the aftermath of World War II. In 1947, he directed his final film, the drama The Courier of the King, based on Stendhal's novel The Red and the Black.

== Selected filmography ==
=== Silent films ===
Year	Title	Preservation status
1921	Red Love	Lost
1921	The Voyage	Lost
1922	Cainà	Cineteca del Friuli
1922	Under the Snow	Public domain
1923	La Boheme	Lost
1924	Orient	Lost
1924	Rudderless	Deutsche Kinemathek
1925	The Doll Queen	Lost
1927	Svengali	Lost
1927	Homesick	Lost
1927	The Champion of the World	Lost
1928	Five Anxious Days	Lost
1928	The President	Lost
1928	The Secret Courier	Cinémathèque de Toulouse
1928	Orient	Lost
1929	Their Son	Lost
1929	The Night of Terror	Lost

Sound films

Year	Title	Notes
1930	The Song of Love	First Italian sound film
1932	The Blue Fleet	Italy's first aviation drama film
1933	Together in the Dark	
1934	Stadium	
1934	The Last of the Bergeracs	
1934	Mr. Desire	
1935	Those Two	
1936	The Amnesiac	
1936	White Amazons	
1937	Abandon All Hope	
1938	They've Kidnapped a Man	
1939	La voce senza volto	
1939	The Boarders at Saint-Cyr	
1939	The Knight of San Marco	
1947	The Courier of the King	Remake of his 1928 silent film
