= Emilio Ghione =

Italian actor, film director, and author (1879–1930)

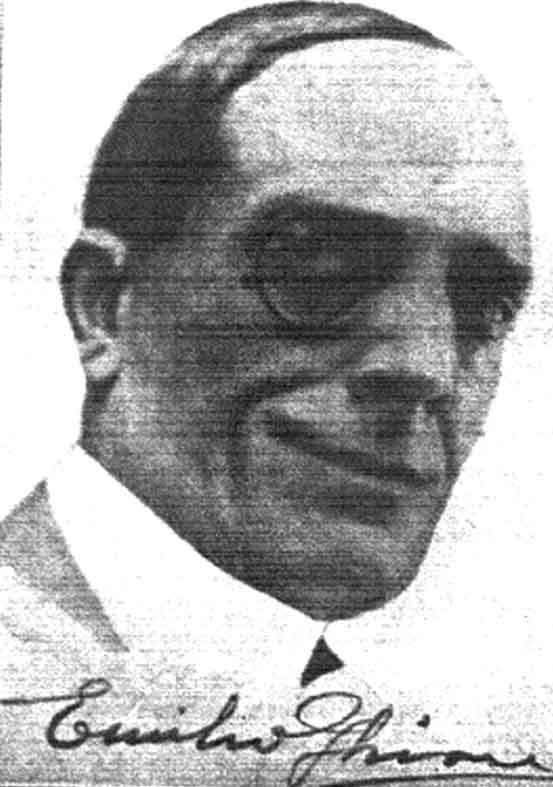
- Emilio Ghione
- Born: Emilio Luigi Carlo Giuseppe Maria Ghione; 30 July 1879; Turin, Italy
- Died: 7 January 1930 (aged 50); Rome, Italy
- Occupations: Actor, director, screenwriter and author
- Years active: 1908-1929
- Spouse: Clotilde Coletti (1911–1930)
- Partner: Kally Sambucini (1915–1930)
- Children: Pierfrancesco Ghione (1911-1982)

Emilio Luigi Carlo Giuseppe Maria Ghione (30 July 1879 – 7 January 1930), known as Emilio Ghione, was an Italian silent film actor, director and screenwriter. Ghione was best known for writing, directing, and starring in the Za La Mort series of adventure films, in which he played a likeable French Apache and 'honest outlaw'.

Ghione directed, wrote, and acted in multiple genres including crime, melodrama, and historical drama, and directed stars including Francesca Bertini, Lina Cavalieri, Alberto Collo, and Hesperia. As film roles became more scarce, Ghione turned to theatre in 1926, joining the Compagnia delle Maschere e del Colore as it toured Italy.

Ghione wrote three novels based around his Za La Mort character; an autobiography; and an essay on Italian silent cinema, before his death from tuberculosis in 1930.

In 1979, a retrospective of Ghione's films was held at the Venice Film Festival. In 2008, a retrospective of his films was held at the Cinema Ritrovato festival in Bologna, and a temporary exhibition of photographs and film stills documenting Ghione's career was opened at the Cineteca of Bologna.

== Film career ==
=== Early life and film career ===
Born in Turin, Emilio Ghione was the son of a minor painter, Celestino Ghione, and initially worked as a painter of miniatures.

Ghione secured work in Turin's growing film industry in 1908, initially as a set-hand and stuntman, performing dangerous stunts involving falling from horses. He began to play secondary roles in a variety of films, including the comedies of André Deed. Frustrated by the slow progress of his career, Ghione left Turin in 1911 to seek his fortune in Rome.

=== Rise to fame ===
In Rome, Ghione quickly progressed to starring roles in films made by Cines and Celio-Film, such as Il poverello di assisi (St Francis on its British release). Ghione then starred in a series of films alongside Francesca Bertini and Alberto Collo, including Histoire d'un Pierrot. Ghione directed his first film as actor-director, Il Circolo Nero, in 1913. Ghione became known for his success in directing the demanding divas of the period, including Lina Cavalieri, Francesca Bertini and Hesperia. However, Ghione was not entirely able to resist their demands - Francesca Bertini allegedly ordered the destruction of all the prints of Don Pietro Caruso because she did not like the outfits she wore in the film.

=== Za La Mort and height of fame ===
In 1914, Ghione created the first film featuring his character Za La Mort, Nelly La Gigolette, which was a great success. Following this success and his move to Tiber film, Ghione created a sequel called Za La Mort (1915), which developed the character and introduced a companion, Za La Vie, played by Kally Sambucini. Ghione created a total of thirteen Za La Mort feature films and three serial films between 1914 and 1924, many of which were very successful commercially. The character of Za La Mort, a Parisian apache, was unstable throughout the series. In some films, Za La Mort was a cruel-hearted, murderous, seductive criminal, while in others he was a romantic, faithful, underworld avenger, similar to Louis Feuillade's Judex.

The Za La Mort series was mostly set in an imaginary Paris, with some episodes set in America and exotic tropical locations. Despite inconsistencies of plot and character and mostly negative critical reviews, Za La Morts exotic, exciting adventures captured the public imagination and Ghione became one of the most recognisable stars of the Italian silent cinema. During the production of the Za La Mort series, Ghione continued to star in and direct a variety of films, including melodramas, adventure films and a biopic of Italian patriot Guglielmo Oberdan.

=== Decline of film career and appearances in theatre ===
In the period 1919-1924, Ghione directed and starred in films for most of the major Italian film companies (including Lombardo (now known as Titanus) and other minor film companies. Ghione's decadent lifestyle and expensive habits left him nearly penniless when the Italian film industry collapsed in 1922. In 1923, he left for Germany to make Zalamort – Der Traum der Zalavie with Fern Andra, but the film was a commercial failure, owing partially to the fact that it was extensively cut by the censors.

Eventually, Ghione's own lack of funds and the commercial failure of several projects meant that he was no longer able to get the investment necessary to make his own film projects. Senza Padre (1924) was his last film as screenwriter, director and actor, and Ghione abandoned his last film project as a director, La Casa Errante, in 1927.

Ghione then acted in several of the 'all-star' productions of 1925-1926, which failed to revive the dying Italian film industry.

In 1926, Ghione launched a theatrical revue with Kally Sambucini and Alberto Collo and toured Italy performing sketches based on the Za La Mort films.

== Career as an author ==
In 1922, Ghione's first Za La Mort novel, Le Maschere Bianche, was published in installments in the popular Al Cinema magazine.

Ghione's second novel, Za La Mort, was published in 1928. The novel was largely based on the Za La Mort films, especially on Zalamort – Der Traum der Zalavie, the plot of which had been made almost unintelligible by censorship cuts. Ghione's autobiography, Memorie e Confessioni also appeared in the monthly cinema magazine Cinemalia between March and December 1928.

During his time in Paris in 1929, Ghione wrote an essay on the history of Italian silent cinema La Parabole du Cinéma Italien (The Parabola of Italian Cinema). This essay was the first look at Italian silent cinema as a whole and was quoted extensively by the first film historians to deal with Italian silent cinema, such as Eugenio Palmieri. The essay was published in the French L'Art Cinematographique series in 1930 and in the Barcelona newspaper La Vanguardia in 1931.

In 1930, another Za La Mort novel was published called L'Ombra di Za La Mort. The novel's central character is Ghione/Za La Mort, a mix of Ghione's decadent star persona and his favourite character, and tells of his adventures across the world and his encounters with beautiful women. The novel features extracts from Ghione's autobiography Memorie e Confessioni and minimises the character of Kally Sambucini/Za La Vie.

== Personal life ==
In 1911, Ghione married Clotilde Coletti and they had one son, Pierfrancesco Ghione, also known as Emilio Ghione Jr. The couple separated after 1913.

In 1915, Ghione started a relationship with Kally Sambucini, which lasted until his death.

Ghione was known for spending money on restaurants, clothes and antiques, and for giving generous tips. He also owned luxury cars made by Lancia and used them in his films.

== Illness and death ==
Emilio Ghione was hospitalised following tuberculosis in 1927. A public appeal was opened for Ghione, and the money was used to help his recovery and send him to Paris in search of work. During his stay in Paris in 1929, Ghione slept rough and his health deteriorated. He was hospitalised in Paris and Lina Cavalieri paid to send him back to Turin by train.

Emilio Ghione died on 7 January 1930 in Rome, in the presence of Kally Sambucini and his son, Pierfrancesco Ghione. His funeral was held at the Roman Basilica of Santa Maria degli Angeli e dei Martiri, and his remains interred in the Verano cemetery in Rome.

== Selected filmography ==
=== Films as actor and director ===
Il circolo nero (1913)

Anime buie (1916)

Dollari e fraks (1919)

- Il Circolo Nero (1913)
- Don Pietro Caruso (1914)
- Nelly La Gigolette (1914)
- Za La Mort (1915)
- Oberdan (1915)
- Anime Buie (1916)
- Il Triangolo Giallo (1917)
- I Topi Grigi (1918)
- Sua Eccellenza La Morte (1919)
- Dollari e Fracks (1919)
- Il castello di bronzo (1920)
- Senza pietà (1921)
- Quale dei due (1922), also known as Za La Mort contro Za La Mort
- La maga e il grifo (1922)
- Latest Night News (1924)
- Za La Mort (1924), known in Italy as L'incubo di Zalavie
- Senza Padre (1926)

=== Films as actor ===
- Come fu che l'ingordigia rovinò il Natale a Cretinetti (1910)
- La Gerusalemme Liberata (1911)
- Broken Idol (1913)
- Pierrot the Prodigal (1913)
- Il Potere Sovrano (1916)
- The Fiery Cavalcade (1925)
- The Last Days of Pompeii (1926)

=== Films as director ===
- Sposa nella morte! (1915) starring Lina Cavalieri
- La rosa di granata (1916), starring Lina Cavalieri

== Bibliography ==
- Abrate, Piero; Longo, Germano (1997). Cento anni di cinema in Piemonte. Turin: Abacus Edizioni.
- Alacci (Alacevich), Tito (1919). Le noste attrici cinematografiche. Florence: Bemporad & Figli.
- Angelini, Antonella (2007). "Alle origini del Cineromanzo: note su Al Cinema". In Alovisio, Silvio (ed.). Cineromanzi. La Collezione del Museo Nazionale del Cinema. Turin: Museo Nazionale del Cinema.
- Brunetta, Gian Piero (2008). Storia Del Cinema Muto Italiano. Bari: Laterza.
- Brunetta, Gian Piero, ed. (2008). Cent'anni di cinema: 1. Dalle origini alla Seconda Guerra Mondiale. Bari: Laterza.
- Collo, Alberto (16 July 1938). "Vita patetica di Alberto Collo, il primo bello dello schermo Italiano. IV. Malinconico Tramonto del Fornaretto". Film (Settimanale di Cinematografo, Teatro e Radio). Rome: Film.
- Ghione, Emilio (1928). Za La Mort. Florence: Nerbini.
- Ghione, Emilio (1930). "La Parabole du Cinema Italien". In Boisyvon, André; Ghione, Emilio; Pisani, Ferri (eds.). L'Art Cinématographique, volume 7. Paris: Félix Alcan.
- Ghione, Emilio (1973). L'Ombra di Za La Mort. Brescia: Bietti.
- Jandelli, Cristina (2007). Breve Storia Del Divismo cinematografico. Venice: Marsilio.
- Lotti, Denis (2008). Emilio Ghione, l'ultimo apache. Bologna: Edizioni Cineteca di Bologna.
- Martinelli, Vittorio (2007). Za La Mort. Bologna: Edizioni Cineteca di Bologna.
- Palmieri, Eugenio Ferdinando (1994). Vecchio Cinema Italiano. Vicenza: Neri Pozza Editore. ISBN 88-7305-458-7.
- Redi, Riccardo (1999). Cinema Muto Italiano (1896-1930). Rome/Venice: Bianco & Nero, Marsilio.
- Soro, Francesco (1935). Splendori e Miserie del Cinema: cose viste e vissute da un avvocato. Milan: Consalvo.
