= Arnold Kent =

American actor

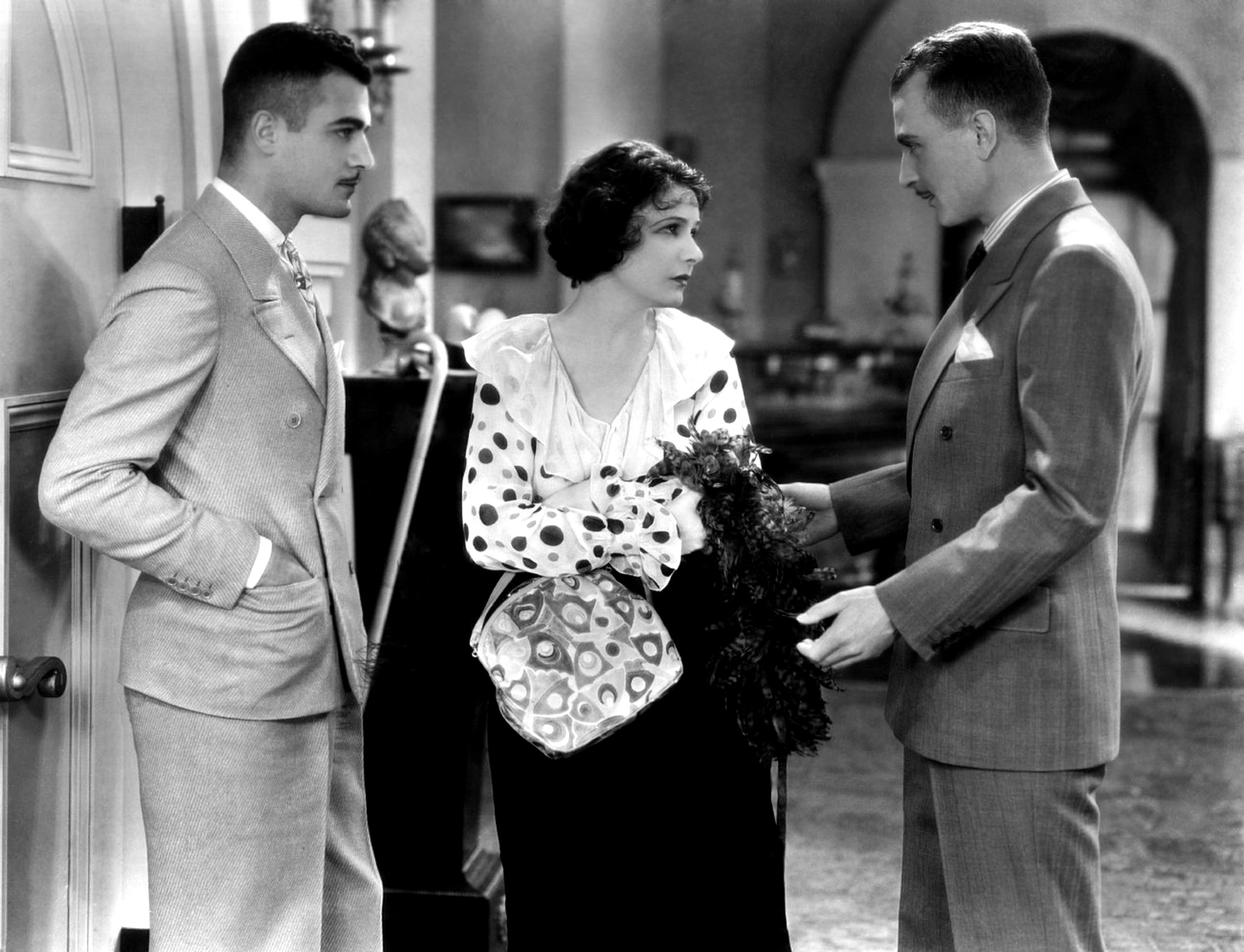
- Gilbert Roland, Norma Talmadge, and Arnold Kent in The Woman Disputed (1928)
- Born: Lido Manetti; 21 January 1899; Sesto Fiorentino, Tuscany, Italy
- Died: 29 September 1928 (aged 29); Los Angeles, California, United States
- Occupation: Actor
- Years active: 1917–1928 (film)

Arnold Kent (21 January 1899 – 29 September 1928) was an Italian-born American actor. He was born in Sesto Fiorentino as Lido Manetti and acted under that name in Italy, appearing in films such as Goodbye Youth (1918) and Quo Vadis (1924). He moved then to Hollywood where he played supporting roles in films such as Hula (1927) with Clara Bow and Clive Brook. He died in Los Angeles the following year after a car accident shortly before he was due to make a film with Mary Pickford.

== Selected filmography ==
- The Clemenceau Affair (1917)
- Goodbye Youth (1918)
- Red Love (1921)
- Through the Shadows (1923)
- Quo Vadis (1924)
- The Hearth Turned Off (1925)
- The Love Thief (1926)
- Maciste against the Sheik (1926)
- Evening Clothes (1927)
- The World at Her Feet (1927)
- Hula (1927)
- The Woman on Trial (1927)
- Beau Sabreur (1928)
- The Showdown (1928)
- The Woman Disputed (1928)

== Bibliography ==
- Goble, Alan. The Complete Index to Literary Sources in Film. Walter de Gruyter, 1999.
- Phillips, Alastair & Vincendeau, Ginette. Journeys of Desire: European Actors in Hollywood. BFI, 2006.
