= Maria Jacobini =

Italian actress (1892–1944)

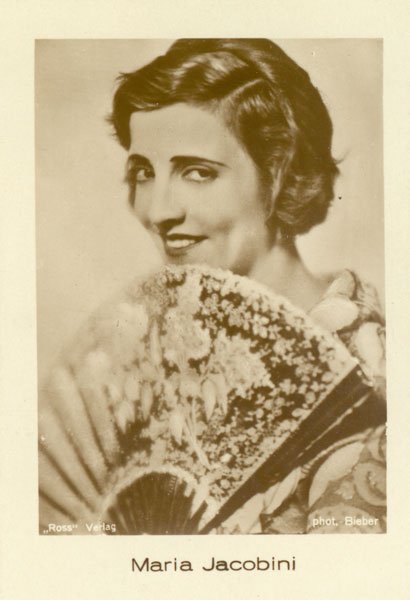
- Born: 17 February 1892; Rome, Lazio, Kingdom of Italy
- Died: 20 November 1944 (aged 52); Rome, Lazio, Italy
- Occupation: film actress
- Years active: 1910–1944

Maria Jacobini (17 February 1892 – 20 November 1944) was an Italian film actress and writer. She was born in Rome. She was married to the film director Gennaro Righelli and appeared in many of his silent films for the Vesuvio Film Company. She and her husband worked in the German film industry in the mid-1920s. She was the older sister of actress Diomira Jacobini. She died in Rome in 1944, at the age of 52.

== Selected filmography ==
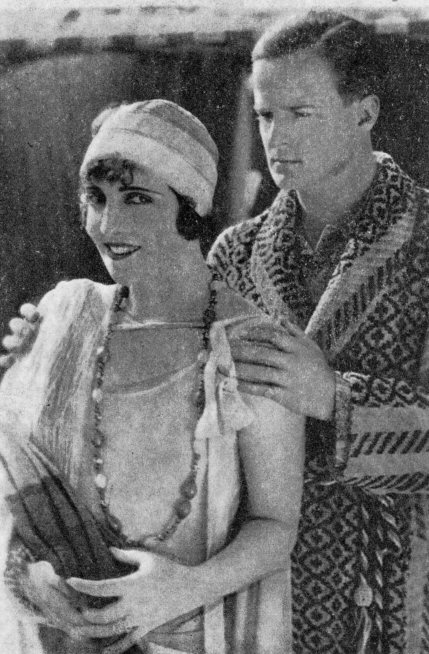
With Malcolm Tod in The Carnival of Venice (1928).

- Joan of Arc (1913)
- Goodbye Youth (1918)
- Tortured Soul (1919)
- The Prey (1921)
- Red Love (1921)
- The Voyage (1921)
- Cainà (1922)
- Under the Snow (1922)
- La Boheme (1923)
- Rudderless (1924)
- Orient (1924)
- The Closed Mouth (1925)
- The Doll Queen (1925)
- Beatrice Cenci (1926)
- The Bordellos of Algiers (1927)
- Bigamie (1927)
- Folly of Love (1928)
- Ariadne in Hoppegarten (1928)
- The Case of Prosecutor M (1928)
- Five Anxious Days (1928)
- The Carnival of Venice (1928)
- Villa Falconieri (1928)
- Maman Colibri (1929)
- The Living Corpse (1929)
- Patatrac (1931)
- La scala (1931)
- The Matchmaker (1934)
- Giuseppe Verdi (1938)
- The Boarders at Saint-Cyr (1939)
- Eternal Melodies (1940)
- The Actor Who Disappeared (1941)
- Street of the Five Moons (1942)
- La signorina (1942)
- The Mountain Woman (1944)

== Bibliography ==
- Moliterno, Gino. The A to Z of Italian Cinema. Scarecrow Press, 2009.
- Vacche, Angela Dalle. Diva: Defiance and Passion in Early Italian Cinema. University of Texas Press, 2008.
