= La maestrina =

La maestrina may refer to:

- The Little Schoolmistress (1919 film), an Italian silent drama film
- The Little Schoolmistress (1934 film), an Italian drama film
- The Little Teacher (1942 film), an Italian drama film
