= Brignone =

Brignone is an Italian surname. Notable people with the surname include:

- Federica Brignone (born 1990), Italian World Cup alpine ski racer
- Guido Brignone (1886–1959), Italian film director and actor
- Lilla Brignone (1913–1984), Italian film and theater actress
- Mercedes Brignone (1885–1967), Spanish-born Italian stage, film and television actress
- Nicolas Brignone (born 1989), French para-sport athlete
