= The Little Schoolmistress =

The Little Schoolmistress may refer to:

- The Little Schoolmistress (1919 film), an Italian silent drama film
- The Little Schoolmistress (1934 film), an Italian drama film

== See also ==
- The Little Teacher (disambiguation)
