= Rissone =

Rissone is a surname. Notable people with the surname include:

- Giuditta Rissone (1895–1977), Italian film actress
- Checco Rissone (1909–1985), Italian actor
- Francesco Rissone (1900–1987), Italian American mobster
