= Busoni (disambiguation) =

Ferruccio Busoni (1866–1924) was an Italian composer.

Busoni may also refer to:

- Manlio Busoni (1906–1999), Italian actor
- Commune of Busoni, a commune of Burundi
