= The Little Schoolmistress (1934 film) =

1934 film

- Directed by: Guido Brignone
- Written by: Guido Brignone
- Based on: The Little Teacher by Dario Niccodemi
- Produced by: Giuseppe Amato
- Starring: Andreina Pagnani; Renato Cialente; Egisto Olivieri
- Cinematography: Ubaldo Arata
- Edited by: Giacinto Solito
- Music by: Armando Fragna
- Production company: Gai
- Distributed by: Società Anonima Stefano Pittaluga
- Release date: 17 April 1934
- Running time: 60 minutes
- Country: Italy
- Language: Italian

The Little Schoolmistress (Italian: La maestrina) is a 1934 Italian drama film directed by Guido Brignone and starring Andreina Pagnani, Renato Cialente and Egisto Olivieri. It was based on a play of the same title by Dario Niccodemi which was again adapted into a 1942 film. It was shot at the Cines Studios in Rome. The film's sets were designed by the art director Gastone Medin. Brignone's sister Mercedes Brignone had starred in a 1919 silent film version of the story directed by Eleuterio Rodolfi.

== Synopsis ==
In a village in rural Tuscany at the turn of the twentieth century the young schoolmistress is wrongly suspected by gossips of conducting a secret romantic affair.

== Cast ==
- Andreina Pagnani as Maria Bini, la maestrina
- Renato Cialente as Il podestà
- Egisto Olivieri as Il commissario
- Enzo Gainotti as Il bidello
- Jone Frigerio as La direttrice
- Mario Ferrari as Giacomo Macchia
- Cesare Zoppetti as Il medico
- Gina Grappasonni as Una collega di Maria

== Bibliography ==
- Chiti, Roberto & Poppi, Roberto. I film: Tutti i film italiani dal 1930 al 1944. Gremese Editore, 2005.
- Goble, Alan. The Complete Index to Literary Sources in Film. Walter de Gruyter, 1999.
