= The Little Teacher =

The Little Teacher may refer to:

- The Little Teacher (1915 film), an American short comedy film
- The Little Teacher (1942 film), an Italian drama film

== See also ==
- The Little Schoolmistress (disambiguation)
