= Le inchieste del commissario Maigret =

Italian television series

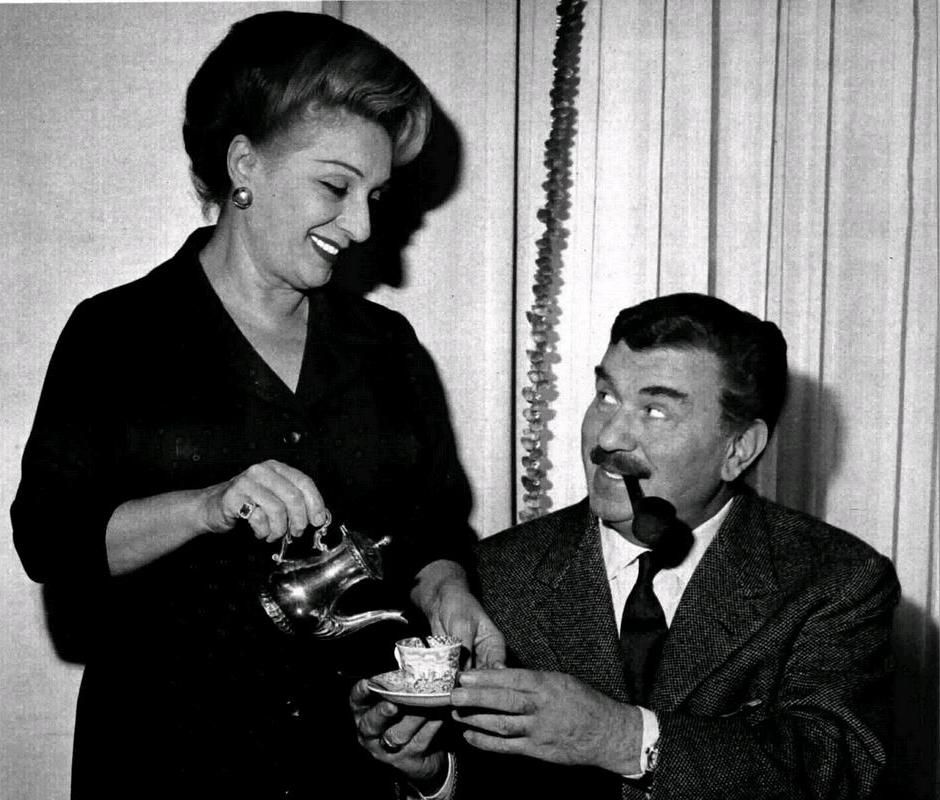
- Andreina Pagnani and Gino Cervi (1966)
- Genre: Detective fiction
- Created by: Mario Landi
- Starring: Gino Cervi; Andreina Pagnani; Mario Maranzana; Manlio Busoni; Daniele Tedeschi; Gianni Musy; Oreste Lionello; Franco Volpi; Edoardo Toniolo; Rino Genovese
- Country of origin: Italy
- Original language: Italian
- No. of seasons: 4
- No. of episodes: 16

Original release
- Network: RAI
- Release: 17 September 1964 – 29 November 1972

Le inchieste del commissario Maigret (i.e. 'The inquiries of the superintendent Maigret') is an Italian television series based on the detective fiction of Georges Simenon about the French police commissaire Jules Maigret, portrayed by Gino Cervi, directed by Mario Landi, in sixteen episodes, produced by RAI.

Shot in black and white, the series was very successful: the last season (1972) was followed by eighteen and a half million viewers.

== Episodes ==
(with dates of first broadcast on Rai Uno)

=== Series 1 ===
1. Un'ombra su Maigret, Novel, (broadcast in three episodes, December 27, 1964, and 1–3 January 1965)
2. L'affare Picpus, Novel, (10, 15 and 17 January 1965)
3. Un Natale di Maigret, Novel, (10 January 1965)
4. Una vita in gioco (A Battle of Nerves), Novel (7, 12 and 14 February 1965)

=== Series 2 ===
1. Non si uccidono i poveri diavoli, Novel (20–27 February 1965)
2. L'ombra cinese, Novel (le 6, 13, 20 et 27 March 1966)
3. La vecchia signora di Bayeux Short story, (3 April 1966)
4. L'innamorato della signora Maigret Short story, (7 April 1966)

=== Series 3 ===
1. Maigret e i diamanti (The Patience of Maigret), Novel (19–26 May and 2 June 1968)
2. Il cadavere scomparso, Short story, (7 July 1968)
3. Maigret e l'ispettore sfortunato, Short story, (9 July 1968)
4. La chiusa, Novel, (14, 21 and 28 July 1968)
5. Maigret sotto inchiesta (Maigret on the Defensive), Novel (4, 11 and 18 August 1968)

=== Series 4 ===
1. Il pazzo di Bergerac (2–3 September 1972)
2. Il ladro solitario (9–10 September 1972)
3. Maigret in pensione (Maigret in Retirement), (16–17 September 1972)

== Cast ==
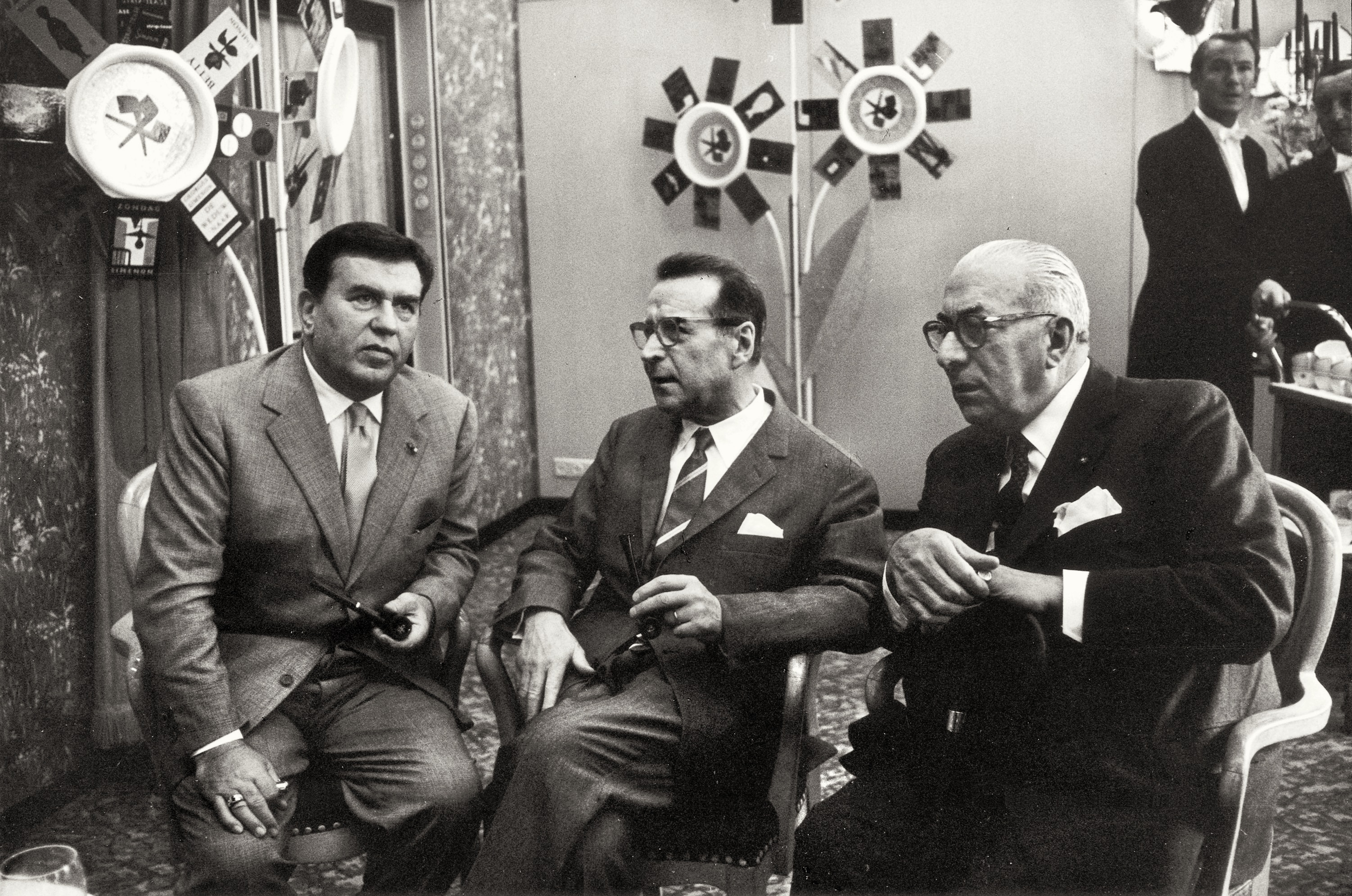
Actor Gino Cervi (left) with the Belgian author Georges Simenon (center) and the Italian publisher Arnoldo Mondadori

=== Main and recurring ===
- Gino Cervi as Commissaire Maigret
- Andreina Pagnani as Mme Maigret
- Mario Maranzana as Inspecteur Lucas
- Manlio Busoni as Inspecteur Torrence
- Daniele Tedeschi as Inspecteur Janvier
- Gianni Musy as Inspecteur Lapointe
- Oreste Lionello as Dr. Moers
- Franco Volpi as Judge Coméliau
- Edoardo Toniolo as Police Director
- Rino Genovese as Bailiff Leopold

=== Guest cast ===
Notable guest stars include

- Sergio Tofano (L'affare Picpus, Il cadavere scomparso)
- Leopoldo Trieste (Maigret e i diamanti)
- Gian Maria Volonté (Una vita in gioco)
- Marisa Merlini (Il pazzo di Bergerac)
- Arnoldo Foà (La chiusa)
- Ugo Pagliai (Una vita in gioco, La vecchia signora di Bayeux)
- Andrea Checchi (Un Natale di Maigret, La chiusa)
- Marina Malfatti (L'ombra cinese)
- Giuseppe Pambieri (Maigret in pensione)
- Loretta Goggi (Non si uccidono i poveri diavoli)
- Lidia Alfonsi (L'ombra cinese)
- Carlo Alighiero (La vecchia signora di Bayeux, Maigret sotto inchiesta)
- Irene Aloisi (Non si uccidono i poveri diavoli)
- Gabriella Andreini (Un'ombra su Maigret, L'ombra cinese, Maigret e l'ispettore sfortunato, Maigret in pensione)
- Lia Angeleri (Un Natale di Maigret)
- Ennio Balbo (Un'ombra su Maigret)
- Aldo Barberito (La vecchia signora di Bayeux, Il ladro solitario)
- Mario Bardella (L'ombra cinese)
- Cesco Baseggio (Maigret sotto inchiesta)
- Antonio Battistella (L'ombra cinese, Maigret e l'ispettore sfortunato)
- Marco Bonetti (Maigret in pensione)
- Andrea Bosic (Non si uccidono i poveri diavoli)
- Mariolina Bovo (L'affare Picpus, Maigret e i diamanti)
- Mercedes Brignone (L'affare Picpus)
- Pier Paola Bucchi (Maigret sotto inchiesta)
- Paolo Carlini (Il pazzo di Bergerac)
- Antonio Casagrande (L'affare Picpus)
- Luigi Casellato (Un'ombra su Maigret)
- Franco Castellani (La vecchia signora di Bayeux)
- Vittorio Congia (Maigret in pensione)
- Mico Cundari (Il ladro solitario, Maigret in pensione)
- Umberto D'Orsi (L'innamorato della signora Maigret)
- Nino Dal Fabbro (Maigret sotto inchiesta)
- Elena de Merik (Un Natale di Maigret, Maigret e i diamanti, Il ladro solitario)
- Antonella Della Porta (La chiusa, Il ladro solitario)
- Vittoria Di Silverio (La vecchia signora di Bayeux)
- Gino Donato (Un'ombra su Maigret)
- Jacqueline Dulac (Maigret e i diamanti)
- Mirko Ellis (Un'ombra su Maigret)
- Mario Feliciani (La vecchia signora di Bayeux, Maigret e i diamanti)
- Jole Fierro (L'affare Picpus, Maigret sotto inchiesta)
- Corrado Gaipa (Maigret in pensione)
- Giovanna Galletti (Il ladro solitario)
- Gianni Garko (L'ombra cinese)
- Ileana Ghione (Maigret e l'ispettore sfortunato)
- Gabriella Giacobbe (L'affare Picpus)
- Giulio Girola (Non si uccidono i poveri diavoli, Il pazzo di Bergerac)
- Carlo Hintermann (L'innamorato della signora Maigret)
- Gino Lavagetto (Una vita in gioco, Il ladro solitario)
- Loris Loddi (L'innamorato della signora Maigret, Il cadavere scomparso)
- Angela Luce (Il pazzo di Bergerac)
- Renato Lupi (Un'ombra su Maigret, Maigret sotto inchiesta, Maigret in pensione)
- Walter Maestosi (Una vita in gioco)
- Michele Malaspina (Non si uccidono i poveri diavoli)
- Evi Maltagliati (L'affare Picpus)
- Augusto Mastrantoni (Non si uccidono i poveri diavoli)
- Anna Mazzamauro (La vecchia signora di Bayeux)
- Gilberto Mazzi (L'affare Picpus)
- Franca Mazzoni (Un'ombra su Maigret, Non si uccidono i poveri diavoli)
- Adriano Micantoni (Maigret e i diamanti)
- Diego Michelotti (Un'ombra su Maigret, Il pazzo di Bergerac)
- Anna Miserocchi (L'ombra cinese)
- Luigi Montini (Maigret e l'ispettore sfortunato)
- Corrado Olmi (Il ladro solitario)
- Orazio Orlando (Un'ombra su Maigret)
- Giuseppe Pagliarini (La vecchia signora di Bayeux)
- Quinto Parmeggiani (Un'ombra su Maigret, Maigret e i diamanti)
- Nino Pavese (L'affare Picpus)
- Didi Perego (L'innamorato della signora Maigret)
- Gino Pernice (L'ombra cinese, Non si uccidono i poveri diavoli, L'innamorato della Signora Maigret)
- Giuseppe Pertile (L'affare Picpus, Il cadavere scomparso)
- Antonio Pierfederici (Maigret sotto inchiesta)
- Giusi Raspani Dandolo (Un'ombra su Maigret)
- Luisa Rivelli (Una vita in gioco)
- Valeria Sabel (Il cadavere scomparso)
- Gina Sammarco (L'ombra cinese)
- Vittorio Sanipoli (Maigret sotto inchiesta)
- Loredana Savelli (L'affare Picpus)
- Franco Scandurra (Un'ombra su Maigret, L'ombra cinese, Maigret e i diamanti, Il pazzo di Bergerac)
- Carmen Scarpitta (La vecchia signora di Bayeux)
- Tino Schirinzi (La vecchia signora di Bayeux)
- Leonardo Severini (L'ombra cinese)
- Stefano Sibaldi (Non si uccidono i poveri diavoli)
- Franco Silva (La vecchia signora di Bayeux, Il ladro solitario)
- Gianni Solaro (Maigret e l'ispettore sfortunato)
- Edda Soligo (L'affare Picpus, Il cadavere scomparso)
- Ivano Staccioli (L'affare Picpus)
- Silvano Tranquilli (L'innamorato della signora Maigret)
- Lino Troisi (Il cadavere scomparso)
- Mila Vannucci (Un'ombra su Maigret, Maigret e i diamanti)
- Jolanda Verdirosi (Non si uccidono i poveri diavoli)
- Nietta Zocchi (L'affare Picpus)

== See also ==
- Maigret a Pigalle (1966)
