= Luisella Beghi =

Italian actress and voice actress

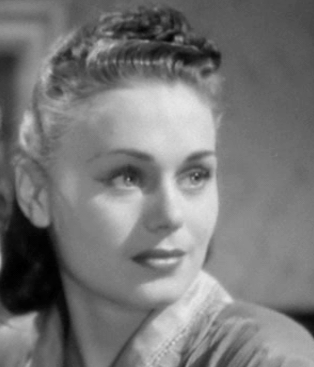
- Born: 22 November 1922; Parma, Kingdom of Italy
- Died: 9 September 2006 (aged 83); Rome, Italy
- Occupation: Actress

Luisella Beghi (1922–2006) was an Italian actress and voice actress.

== Biography ==
Born in Parma, at very young age Beghi moved to Rome, where she was one of the first female students of the Centro Sperimentale di Cinematografia. Graduated in 1938, Beghi almost immediately debuted on the big screen but her first roles were small and even insignificant. Her first role of weight was Emilia, the young saleswoman with emotional problems in Mario Camerini's I grandi magazzini. Between 1940 and 1942 she got her most significant and critically appreciated roles, in films as Eternal Melodies by Carmine Gallone (in which she played Constance Weber Mozart, Wolfgang Amadeus Mozart's wife), Turbamento (1942) by Guido Brignone, and Via delle Cinque Lune (1942) by Luigi Chiarini. After her marriage Beghi slowed her activity and in mid-fifties she eventually retired from acting, preferring to concentrate on her family and children.

== Selected filmography ==
- The Two Mothers (1938)
- Heartbeat (1939)
- Department Store (1939)
- Eternal Melodies (1940)
- Red Roses (1940)
- Disturbance (1942)
- Street of the Five Moons (1942)
- Angelo tra la folla (1950)
- Captain Demonio (1950)
- The Country of the Campanelli (1954)
- The Belle of Rome (1955)
