= Marta Abba =

Italian actress (1900–1988)

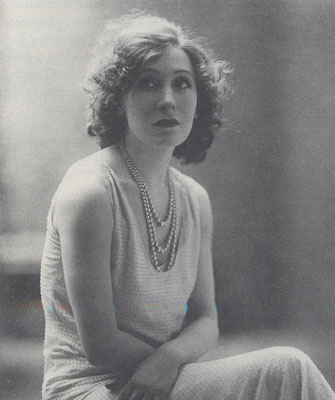
- Born: 25 June 1900; Milan, Kingdom of Italy
- Died: 24 June 1988 (aged 87); Milan, Italy
- Spouse: Severance Millikin (m.1938–div.1952)

Marta Abba (25 June 1900 – 24 June 1988) was an Italian actress, considered as the muse of the playwright Luigi Pirandello.

== Life and career ==
Abba was born in Milan and was the sister of another actress, Cele Abba.

At the age of fourteen, Abba tried to enter the Academy of Drama Lovers in Milan (in Italian: Accademia dei Filodrammatici). However, she had to wait a year before getting accepted since she was too young. She attended it for three years, then she was cast by dramatist Sabatino Lopez and she began performing together with the acting company headed by Enrico Reinach in Milan.

After their meeting in 1925 and until his death in 1936, Marta Abba was the stimulus to the playwright Luigi Pirandello's creativity. She was an aspiring young 25-year-old actress when she met the 58-year-old playwright, whose wife had been confined to a mental asylum in 1919. From their correspondence, it comes out that she not only inspired him but she also gave the writer confidence, in his work. Their relationship was complex but contributed much to the Italian theatre.

Pirandello was obsessive in pursuit of what could be presumed to have remained an unconsummated affair. Marta was the true great actress for whom he had been waiting after his earlier bitter disappointment with Eleonora Duse. Luigi Pirandello's and Marta Abba's letters to each other have been translated into English. Marta Abba and Pirandello teamed up in 1925, and she appeared in many of his productions at the Rome Arts Theater. In 1930, Abba founded her own theatrical company and specialized in staging the works of Pirandello and other European playwrights like George Bernard Shaw, Gabriele d'Annunzio and Carlo Goldoni under the direction of prestigious directors like Max Reinhardt and Guido Salvini.

Her Broadway theatre debut was in the play Tovarich at the Plymouth Theatre, (October 15, 1936 – c. August 1937) in the role of Grand Duchess Tatiana Petrovna. Marta Abba's screen début in Broadway was in Loyalty of Love, in 1937. In January 1938, she married a wealthy Cleveland polo player, Severance Allen Millikin and settled down in Cleveland, Ohio until 1952, when she divorced and returned to Italy.

After her marriage, she performed summer stock at Cain Park Theatre in Cleveland Heights, Ohio in two productions: Divorçons by Sardou (August 21–24, 1941) and Pirandello's Right You Are (If You Say You Are) (July 22–25, 1942).

For Divorçons, Abba insisted on working on a new translation so that the words "would fit her mouth." Abba was also a stickler for realism, insisting that Frank Monoco, a leading Cleveland restaurateur, play the maitre d'hotel so that he could serve an entire dinner onstage, which included the carving a whole fowl. Cain Park is an outdoor theatre which provided no shelter for the audience in the 1940s. The final performance of Divorcons had to be relocated to Severance Hall because of rain. Marta Abba used her own limousine to transport props and costumes to the Hall where the performance occurred "against the drapes". The scenic design for Divorcons was by the American industrial designer Viktor Schreckengost. The total attendance for the 4 performances of Divorcons was 11,183 paid admissions, so Cain Park Theatre was eager to have Abba return in another production.

Abba consented to appear in Pirandello's Right You Are (If You Say You Are) the next year. When Abba appeared in the play's original production in Italy, she had a small role. This time, she took the lead of the ageing Lady Frola. Although a director had been assigned to the production, Abba quickly overtook those duties herself. Dr. Dina Rees Evans, supervising director of Cain Park, recalled:

"She wanted to have rehearsals longer than we were able to have them, many times four, five and seven-hour sessions. She was used to them, but eventually came to understand that other plays were in rehearsal, and some of her cast was playing at night as well. Miss Abba suggested that she didn't like having actors sit down during rehearsals, it sets the atmosphere and the mood of being on your toes. She instructed (the cast) to listen carefully to scenes they were in and those they were not in."

This production was the only time Abba performed in a play by Pirandello in the United States.

Abba expressed an interest in starting an acting school, using the sunken garden area of the Severance Estate as a performing area. However, divorce proceedings soon ensued and Abba returned to Italy.

In the last years of her life, she suffered from paresis and had to use a wheelchair. She died, at 87, in Milan, from a cerebral haemorrhage, one day before her 88th birthday

She published her autobiography in Italian, La mia vita di attrice.

== Selected filmography ==
- The Haller Case directed by Alessandro Blasetti (1933)
- Loyalty of Love, directed by Guido Brignone (1934)

== Selected plays ==
Some of the plays written by Luigi Pirandello in which Marta Abba acted:

- The New Colony (La Nuova Colonia)
- As You Desire Me (Come tu mi vuoi)
- Finding Oneself (Trovarsi)
- The Wives' Friend (L'Amica delle Mogli)
- Diana and Tuda (Diana e La Tuda)
- You Don't Know How (Non Si Sa Come)
