= Carlo Veneziani =

Italian playwright and screenwriter

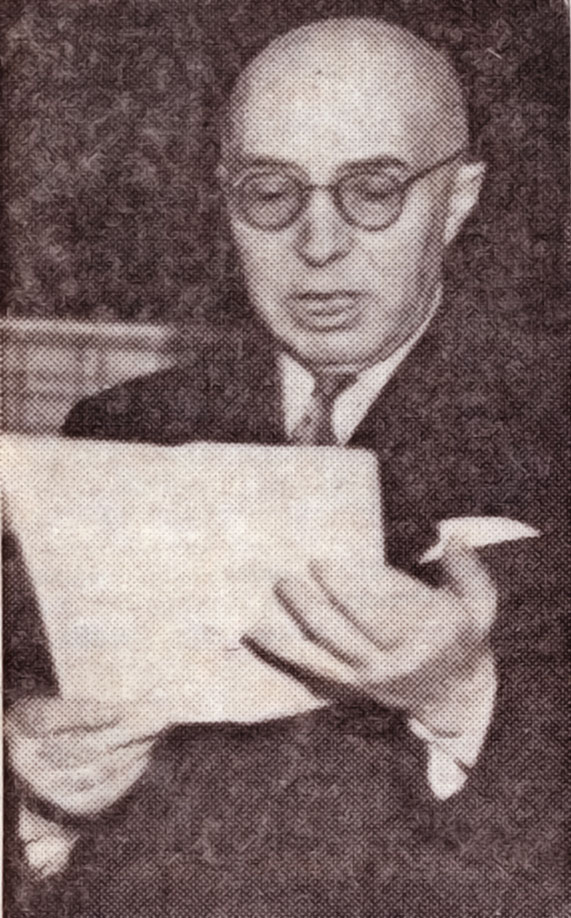
- Born: 12 July 1882; Leporano, Apulia, Kingdom of Italy
- Died: 17 January 1950 (aged 67); Milan, Italy
- Occupation: Writer

Carlo Veneziani (12 July 1882 – 17 January 1950) was an Italian playwright and screenwriter. He wrote the comedy play The Ancestor which was later adapted into a film of the same title.

== Selected filmography ==
- The Ancestor (1938)
- The Boarders at Saint-Cyr (1939)
- The Hussar Captain (1940)
- The Devil Goes to Boarding School (1944)

== Bibliography ==
- Estavan, Lawrence & Burgess, Mary Wickizer, The Italian Theatre in San Francisco (Wildside Press, 1991)
