= The Golden Vein =

1928 film

- Directed by: Guglielmo Zorzi
- Written by: Guglielmo Zorzi (play); Luciano Doria
- Starring: Diana Karenne; Elio Steiner; Giovanni Cimara
- Cinematography: Ferdinando Martini
- Production company: Autori Direttori Italiani Associati
- Distributed by: Consorzio Cinematografico E.I.A.
- Release date: December 1928
- Running time: 92 minutes
- Country: Italy
- Languages: Silent; Italian intertitles

The Golden Vein (Italian: La vena d'oro) is a 1928 Italian silent comedy film directed by Guglielmo Zorzi and starring Diana Karenne, Elio Steiner, and Giovanni Cimara. It was adapted from Zorzi's own play. It is now considered a lost film. It was subsequently remade as sound film in 1955.

== Cast ==
- Diana Karenne as Contessa Maria Usberti
- Elio Steiner as Corrado Usberti, suo figlio
- Giovanni Cimara as Guido Manfredi
- Enrico Scatizzi as il professore Alban
- Nini Dinelli as Amelia Carena
- Augusto Bandini
- Carlo Benetti
- Renato Malavasi

== Bibliography ==
- Enrico Lancia & Roberto Poppi. Dizionario del cinema italiano: Gli artisti. Gli attori dal 1930 ai giorni nostri. M - Z., Volume 3. Gremese Editore, 2003.
