= The Ancestor =

1936 film

- Directed by: Guido Brignone
- Written by: Carlo Veneziani (play); Guido Brignone
- Produced by: Oreste Cariddi Barbieri
- Starring: Antonio Gandusio; Paola Barbara; Mercedes Brignone; Aldo Silvani
- Cinematography: Otello Martelli
- Edited by: Giuseppe Fatigati
- Music by: Renzo Rossellini
- Production company: Astra Film
- Distributed by: ENIC
- Release date: 1936
- Running time: 76 minutes
- Country: Italy
- Language: Italian

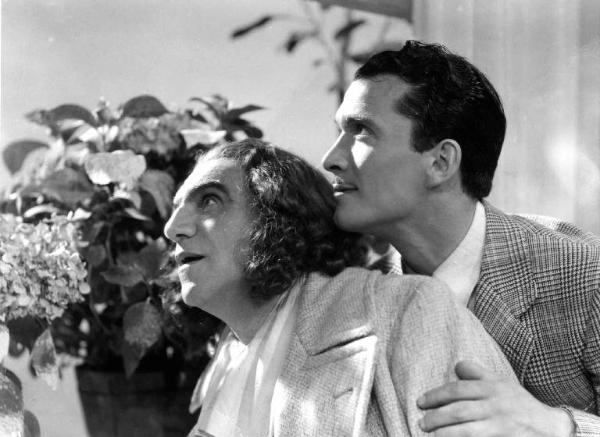
Antonio Gandusio and Maurizio D'Ancora in The Ancestor.

The Ancestor (Italian: L'antenato) is a 1936 Italian comedy film directed by Guido Brignone and starring Antonio Gandusio, Paola Barbara and Mercedes Brignone. It is an adaptation of a play by Carlo Veneziani, and was made at the Palatino Studios in Rome.

== Cast ==
- Antonio Gandusio as barone di Montespanto
- Paola Barbara as Germana
- Mercedes Brignone as signora Leuci
- Aldo Silvani as Ascanio
- Olivia Fried as Vannetta
- Minna Rubino Rossini as Fanny
- Maurizio D'Ancora as Guiscardo di Montespanto
- Guglielmo Barnabò as Bergandi
- Claudio Ermelli as Samuele
- Vittorio Simbolotti as Egido
- Dina Romano
- Alessandra Varna
- Rocco D'Assunta
- Giovanni Conforti

== Bibliography ==
- Moliterno, Gino. Historical Dictionary of Italian Cinema. Scarecrow Press, 2008.
