= Andreina Pagnani =

Italian actress and voice actress

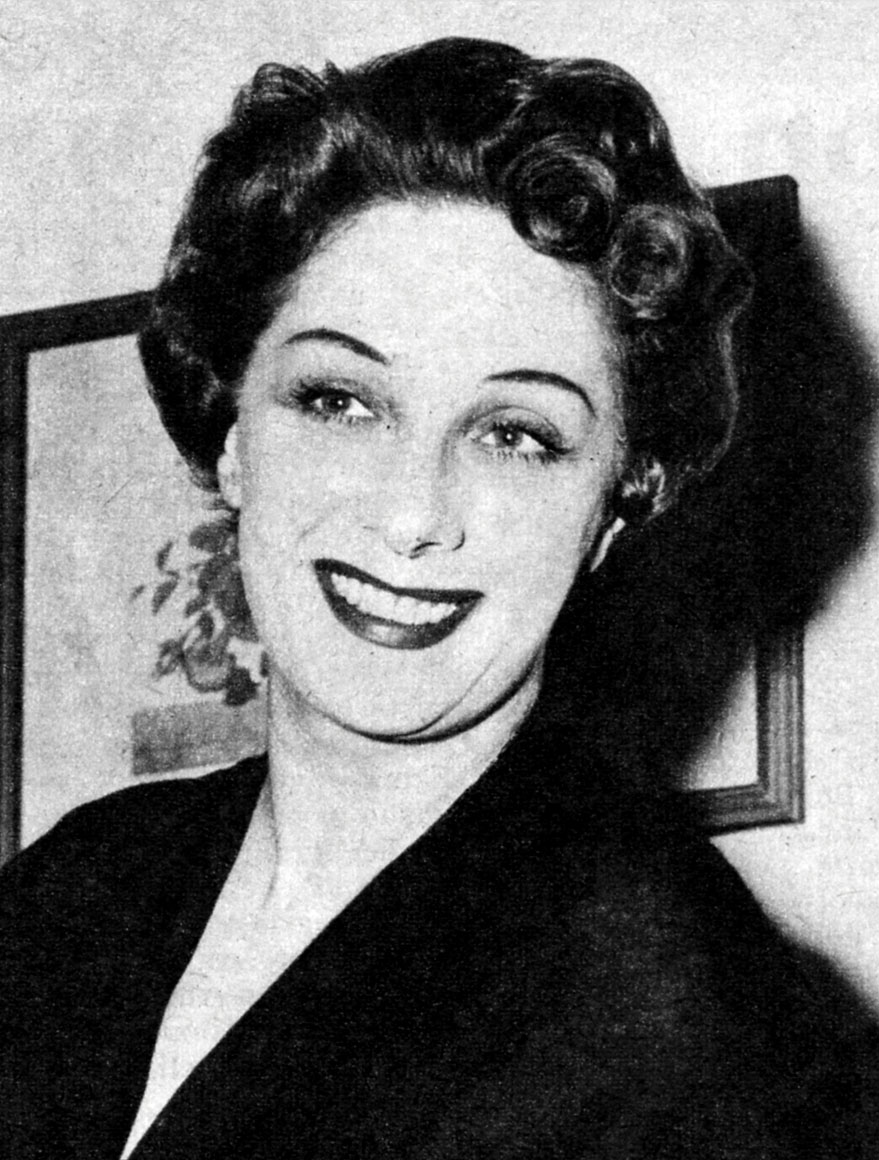
- Born: Andreina Gentili; 24 November 1906; Rome, Italy
- Died: 22 November 1981 (aged 74); Rome, Italy
- Occupations: Actress; voice actress
- Years active: 1924–1981
- Spouse: Federico Franco Pagnani (m. 1927; died 1933)

Andreina Pagnani (born Andreina Gentili; 24 November 1906 – 22 November 1981) was an Italian actress and voice actress.

== Biography ==
Born in Rome, Italy, and the daughter of a dresser, at a young age Pagnani studied the harp and the piano, then she devoted herself to theatre and then entering the stage companies Artistica Operaia e Giovanni Emanuel. In a short time Pagnani became a prima donna of Italian theater, working among others with Totò, Gino Cervi, Gabriele Ferzetti, Lauretta Masiero.

She made her film debut in 1924, in the silent film L'osteria di Mozzadita. Her film activity was long but very irregular, and almost entirely consisting of supporting roles. She obtained a large popularity as the Maigret's wife in the TV series Le inchieste del commissario Maigret, broadcast on RAI from 1964 to 1972.

Pagnani was also very active as a voice actress and a dubber. She dubbed actresses such as Marlene Dietrich, Bette Davis, Rhonda Fleming, Gloria Swanson, Katharine Hepburn, Barbara Stanwyck, Greta Garbo, Ginger Rogers and many more. She was among the earliest of Italy's prominent dub actresses along with Lydia Simoneschi, Rosetta Calavetta, Giovanna Scotto and Tina Lattanzi.

=== Personal life ===
In 1927, Pagnani was married to the aviator Federico Franco Pagnani until he died in a plane crash in 1933. She also dated actor Alberto Sordi for nine years, who was nearly 14 years her junior.

== Filmography ==
=== Cinema ===
- Mese mariano (1929)
- Patatrac (1931)
- Acqua cheta (1933) – Anita
- Il presidente della Ba.Ce.Cre.Mi. (1933) – Signorina Rossi
- The Little Schoolmistress (1934) – Maria Bini, la maestrina
- Quella vecchia canaglia (1934) – Susanna
- Il serpente a sonagli (1935) – Sonia
- Orizzonte dipinto (1941)
- Apparition (1943) – Zia Ortensia
- Caccia all'uomo (1948) – Suor Simplicia
- La nemica (1952) – Duchessa Anna di Nemi (Voice, Uncredited)
- Concert of Intrigue (1954) – Elisabetta Tabor || (Voice, Uncredited)
- Il padrone sono me (1955) – La signora Maria
- Io, Caterina (1957)
- Domenica è sempre domenica (1958) – Countess Clotilde Landolfi Ferretti
- Call Girls of Rome (1960) – Arabella
- Le pillole di Ercole (1960) – Giovanna
- The Lovemakers (1961) – Maîtresse (Voice, Uncredited)
- The Last Judgment (1961) – Guest of Matteoni
- The Commandant (1963) – Francesca Cavalli
- I 2 vigili (1967) – Herself (Uncredited)
