= Golden Vein =

The Golden Vein
- Directed by: Mauro Bolognini
- Starring: Märta Torén; Richard Basehart
- Release date: 21 October 1955
- Running time: 86 minutes
- Country: Italy
- Language: Italian

The Golden Vein (Italian: La vena d'oro) is a 1955 Italian drama film directed Mauro Bolognini and starring Märta Torén and Richard Basehart. It is based on a play by Guglielmo Zorzi which had previously been made into the 1928 silent film The Golden Vein.

== Plot ==
Corrado is a teenager who lives with his mother Maria who has been totally dedicated to him since her husband's death. The boy invites Stefano, an archaeologist, to his house, who immediately falls in love with his mother. Maria begins to flourish again but her son, exaggeratedly jealous, tries to stop this story in the bud and at the same time ruins his first love affair with Carla. It will be Maria who will help Corrado to win back the girl; in turn Corrado will call Stefano back, allowing him to be next to his mother.

== Cast ==
- Märta Torén - Maria
- Richard Basehart - Ing. Stefano Manfredi
- Titina De Filippo - Teresa
- Terence Hill - Corrado
- Bianca Maria Ferrari - Carla Albani
- Elsa Vazzoler - Duchessa Giulia Carena
- Hélène Vercors - Signora Albani
- Arturo Bragaglia
- Violetta Napierska - Violetta
