= The Street Has Many Dreams =

- Directed by: Mario Camerini
- Written by: Piero Tellini; Mario Camerini
- Produced by: Dino De Laurentiis
- Starring: Anna Magnani; Massimo Girotti; Checco Rissone
- Cinematography: Aldo Tonti
- Edited by: Mario Camerini; Adriana Novelli
- Music by: Nino Rota
- Production company: Lux Film
- Distributed by: Lux Film
- Release date: 9 October 1948
- Running time: 84 minutes
- Country: Italy
- Language: Italian

The Street Has Many Dreams (Italian: Molti sogni per le strade) is a 1948 Italian comedy film directed by Mario Camerini and starring Anna Magnani, Massimo Girotti and Checco Rissone. The film's sets were designed by the art director Alberto Boccianti.

== Cast ==
- Anna Magnani as Linda Bertoni
- Massimo Girotti as Paolo Bertoni
- Checco Rissone as Donato
- Dante Maggio as Emilio
- Checco Durante as Il parroco
- Luigi Pavese as Il commendatore Giulio Carocci
- Italo Tancredi as Egisto
- Giorgio Nimmo as Romoletto Bertoni
- Ciro Berardi as Sor Antonio - il salumaio
- Manlio Busoni as L'appuntato di pubblica sicurezza
- Paolo Ferrara as Il brigadiere siciliano
- Enrico Glori as Il ricettatore
- Gino Leurini as Il garzone del lattaio
- Nadia Niver as La figlia di Egisto
- Franco Pesce as Il lattaio
- Dina Romano as La moglie di Egisto
- Peppino Spadaro as Il commissario

== Bibliography ==
- Miguel Mera & David Burnand. European Film Music. Ashgate Publishing, 2006.
