= Olga Vittoria Gentilli =

Italian actress

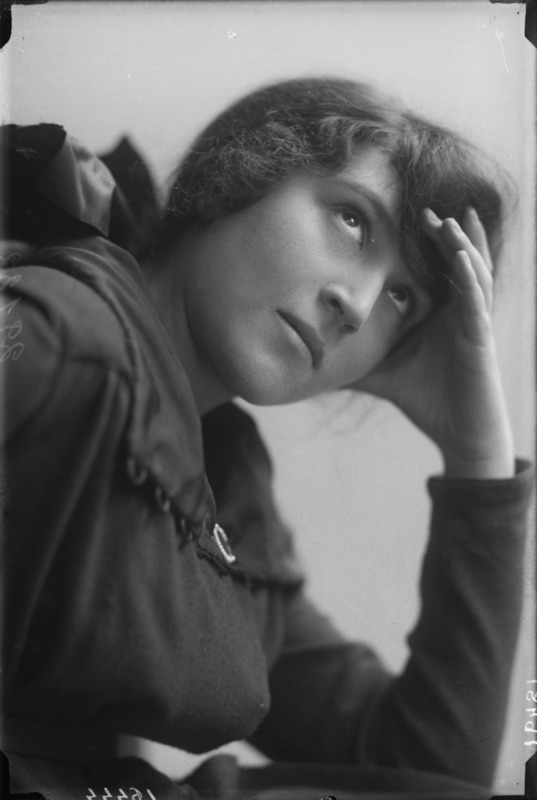
- Born: 19 July 1888; Naples, Kingdom of Italy
- Died: 29 May 1957 (aged 68); Rapallo, Genoa, Italy
- Occupation: Actress
- Years active: 1933–1953 (film)

Olga Vittoria Gentilli (19 July 1888 – 29 May 1957) was an Italian stage and film actress. She appeared in around forty films during the Fascist era and immediate post-war years. She generally played supporting roles in films such as Naples of Olden Times (1938).

== Selected filmography ==
- Together in the Dark (1933)
- Adam's Tree (1936)
- To Live (1937)
- The Two Misanthropists (1937)
- Naples of Olden Times (1938)
- Captain Fracasse (1940)
- Eternal Melodies (1940)
- Teresa Venerdì (1941)
- Tosca (1941)
- Honeymoon (1941)
- The Adventuress from the Floor Above (1941)
- A Garibaldian in the Convent (1942)
- The Peddler and the Lady (1943)
- Two Hearts (1943)
- The Tyrant of Padua (1946)
- Baron Carlo Mazza (1948)
- Son of the Hunchback (1952)

== Bibliography ==
- Landy, Marcia. Italian Film. Cambridge University Press, 2000.
