= Before the Jury =

1931 film

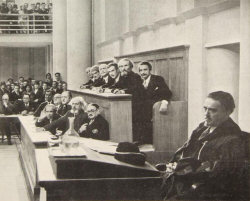
- Scene photo of Corte d'Assise (1930)
- Directed by: Guido Brignone
- Written by: Mario Serandrei; Giuseppe Romualdi; Guido Brignone
- Starring: Marcella Albani; Lia Franca; Carlo Ninchi; Renzo Ricci
- Cinematography: Ubaldo Arata; Massimo Terzano
- Edited by: Guido Brignone
- Music by: Pietro Sassoli
- Production company: Società Italiana Cines
- Distributed by: Societa Anonima Stefano Pittaluga
- Release date: January 1931
- Running time: 70 minutes
- Country: Italy
- Language: Italian

Before the Jury (Italian title: Corte d'Assise) is a 1931 Italian crime film directed by Guido Brignone and starring Marcella Albani, Lia Franca and Carlo Ninchi. It was made at the Cines Studios in Rome. The film is a precursor to the later genre of Giallo films.

== Cast ==
- Marcella Albani as Leda Astorri
- Lia Franca as Dora Bardi
- Carlo Ninchi as Marcello Barra, il guardacaccia
- Renzo Ricci as Aroldo Cramoli
- Elio Steiner as Giulio Alberti
- Elvira Marchionni as La cognata del guardiacaccia
- Giovanni Cimara as Alberto Astorri
- Camillo De Rossi as Adolfo Calandri
- Vasco Creti as Giovanni, il cameriere di casa Astorri
- Franco Coop as Il portiere di casa Calandri
- Giorgio Bianchi as Lo sconosciuoto
- Luigi Carini as Il presidente del tribunale
- Raimondo Van Riel as Il procuratore generale
- Oreste Fares as L'avvocato difensore
- Nino Altieri
- Augusto Bandini
- Vittorio Bianchi
- Amerigo Bombrazzi
- Mercedes Brignone
- Rosetta Calavetta
- Bruno Castellani
- Alberto Castelli
- Francesco Ciancamerla
- Umberto Cocchi
- Enrico De Martino
- Jolanda Di Lorenzo
- Clara Di Martignano
- Giuseppe Farnesi
- Tullio Galvani
- Giuseppe Gambardella
- Walter Grant
- Umberto Maestri
- Enrico Marignetti
- Angelo Marsili
- Alfredo Martinelli
- Roberto Pasetti
- Giuseppe Pierozzi
- Rinaldo Rinaldi
- Flora Rossini
- Gino Sabbatini
- Umberto Sacripante
- Franz Sala
- Salvatore Schiavo
- Lorenzo Soderini
- Elena Zoar

== Bibliography ==
- Moliterno, Gino. A to Z of Italian Cinema. Scarecrow Press, 2009.
