= Down with Misery =

1945 film

- Directed by: Gennaro Righelli
- Written by: Mario Monicelli; Nicola Fausto Neroni; Gennaro Righelli
- Produced by: Umberto Bompani; Valentino Brosio
- Starring: Anna Magnani; Nino Besozzi; Marisa Vernati
- Cinematography: Rodolfo Lombardi
- Edited by: Duilio A. Lucarelli
- Music by: Umberto Mancini
- Production company: Domus Film
- Distributed by: Lux Film
- Release date: December 27, 1945
- Running time: 90 minutes
- Country: Italy
- Language: Italian

Down with Misery (Italian: Abbasso la miseria!) is a 1945 Italian comedy drama film directed by Gennaro Righelli and starring Anna Magnani, Nino Besozzi and Marisa Vernati. It was shot at the Farnesina Studios in Rome during the autumn of 1945. The film's sets were designed by the art director Gino Brosio. It was released in the wake of Magnani's success in Roberto Rossellini's Rome, Open City. It makes reference to the thriving black market in postwar Italy and was followed by a loose sequel Peddlin' in Society (1946), which focused on a similar theme.

== Synopsis ==
Nannina, a Roman housewife, is frustrated by her truck driver's husband Giovanni's refusal to take part in the black market and pressures him into take part in illegal actions with their more successful neighbour Gaetano. While he is in Naples, Giovanni rescues and adopts a boy he finds in the bombed-out southern city. His wife is furious and coldly rejects the boy at first, but gradually warms to him. Meanwhile, Giovanni becomes involved in fake currency smuggling, bringing the family increased prosperity, until he is caught and sent briefly to prison. The boy's father than turns up, he had gone missing rather than be killed in the bombing, and offers Giovanni an honest job.

== Cast ==
- Anna Magnani as Nannina Straselli
- Nino Besozzi as Giovanni Straselli
- Virgilio Riento as Gaetano Schioppa
- Marisa Vernati as Caterina Schioppa
- Vito Chiari as Nello Esposito
- Sandro Ruffini as Porzio Ray
- Lauro Gazzolo as Commendator Trombetti
- Aldo Silvani as The cellmate
- Vittorio Mottini as The father of Nello
- Checco Durante as The bellman of the radiogram
- Mario Castellani as A police officer

== Bibliography ==
- Burke, Frank. A Companion to Italian Cinema. John Wiley & Sons, 2017.
- Gundle, Stephen. Fame Amid the Ruins: Italian Film Stardom in the Age of Neorealism. Berghahn Books, 2019.
- Sorlin, Pierre. Italian National Cinema. Routledge, 2006.
