= The Little Schoolmistress (1919 film) =

1919 film

- Directed by: Eleuterio Rodolfi
- Based on: The Little Schoolmistress by Dario Niccodemi
- Starring: Mercedes Brignone; Domenico Serra
- Cinematography: Luigi Fiorio
- Production company: Rodolfifilm
- Distributed by: Rodolfifilm
- Release date: May 1919
- Country: Italy
- Languages: Silent; Italian intertitles

The Little Schoolmistress (Italian: La maestrina) is a 1919 Italian silent drama film directed by Eleuterio Rodolfi and starring Mercedes Brignone and Domenico Serra. It is based on the play of the same title by Dario Niccodemi, later adapted into 1934 and 1942 sound versions.

== Synopsis ==
In a Tuscan village the schoolteacher is suspected by local gossip of conducting a clandestine affair.

== Cast ==
- Domenico Serra
- Mercedes Brignone
- Giuseppe Brignone
- Linda Mozzato

== Bibliography ==
- Bernardini, Aldo. Il cinema muto italiano, Volume 11. Nuova ERI, 1995.
- Goble, Alan. The Complete Index to Literary Sources in Film. Walter de Gruyter, 1999.
