= The Two Sergeants (1922 film) =

1922 film

- Directed by: Guido Brignone
- Written by: Théodore Baudouin d'Aubigny (play)
- Starring: Vasco Creti; Mercedes Brignone
- Production company: Rodolfifilm
- Distributed by: Rodolfifilm
- Release date: December 1922
- Country: Italy
- Languages: Silent; Italian intertitles

The Two Sergeants (Italian: I due sergenti) is a 1922 Italian silent historical drama film directed by Guido Brignone and starring Vasco Creti and Mercedes Brignone. It is an adaptation of Théodore Baudouin d'Aubigny's 1823 play of the same title, which has been made into several films. It is set during the Napoleonic Wars. It was released in Britain in 1925 under the title The Flame of Honour.

== Cast ==
- Liliana Ardea
- Giuseppe Brignone as Caporal Debin
- Mercedes Brignone as Claudie
- Ria Bruna as Sylviane
- Giovanni Cimara
- Giovanni Ciusa as Napoleon
- Vasco Creti as Capitaine Devers / Bernard
- Cesare Gani Carini
- Oreste Grandi
- Vittorio Pieri
- Armand Pouget as Major Tebor
- Lola Romanos as Alice Debin
- Luigi Stinchi

== Bibliography ==
- James Robert Parish & Kingsley Canham. Film Directors Guide: Western Europe. Scarecrow Press, 1976.
