= Domenico Serra =

Italian stage and film actor

- Born: 19 September 1899; Crescentino, Piedmont; Italy
- Died: 9 April 1965 (aged 65); Rome, Lazio; Italy
- Occupation: Actor
- Years active: 1913–1956 (film)

Domenico Serra (1899–1965) was an Italian stage and film actor. He made more than sixty films, many of them during the silent era including Mario Bonnard's historical film The Betrothed (1923). In the sound era, he largely played supporting or minor roles.

== Partial filmography ==
- Il tesoro della cattedrale (1915)
- Il diamante azzurro (1916)
- Il germoglio della morte (1916)
- La trovata del brasiliano (1916)
- L'apostolo (1916)
- The Cavalcade of Dreams (1917)
- Wanda Warenine (1917)
- Sorrisi e spasimi della menzogna (1917)
- Maternità (1917)
- Le due orfanelle di Torino (1917)
- I raggi 'Z' (1917)
- Il rifugio dell'alba (1918)
- Il marito dell'amica (1919)
- Le labbra e il cuore (1919)
- The Little Schoolmistress (1919)
- Il buon Samaritano (1919)
- Il mistero della casa di fronte (1919)
- Federica d'Illiria (1919)
- Il ventriloquo (1920)
- Il marito in campagna (1920)
- The Shadow (1920)
- Il tredicesimo commensale (1921)
- The Painting of Osvaldo Mars (1921) - Osvald Mars, il pittore
- Il tango dei trapassatti (1921)
- L'inafferrabile (1922)
- The Betrothed (1922) - Renzo Tramaglino
- El martirio de vivir (1922)
- Il forzato dell'amore (1923)
- Il capolavoro di Saetta (1923)
- Contro corrente (1923)
- La taverna verde (1924) - Il viveur
- Pleasure Train (1924)
- Chief Saetta (1924)
- Maciste all'inferno (1925) - Giorgio
- Steel (1933)
- La voce senza volto (1939) - L'altro aiutante del regista
- La notte delle beffe (1939)
- Cuori nella tormenta (1940) - Renato
- Piccolo alpino (1940)
- Lucky Night (1941)
- The Betrothed (1941) - Tonio (uncredited)
- Se io fossi onesto (1942) - Il maggiordomo del barone Vareghi
- La fabbrica dell'imprevisto (1942)
- Quelli della montagna (1943) - (uncredited)
- Lo sbaglio di essere vivo (1945)
- O sole mio (1946)
- The Opium Den (1947) - (uncredited)
- I fratelli Karamazoff (1947)
- Lost in the Dark (1947)
- L'ebreo errante (1948)
- Il corriere di ferro (1948)
- Margaret of Cortona (1950)
- The Beggar's Daughter (1950)
- Bellezze in bicicletta (1951)
- Jolanda, the Daughter of the Black Corsair (1953) - Ramon
- The Steel Rope (1954)
- Orphan of the Ghetto (1954)
- The Song of the Heart (1955)
- Canzone proibita (1956) - (final film role)

== Bibliography ==
- Goble, Alan. The Complete Index to Literary Sources in Film. Walter de Gruyter, 1999.
