= The Painting of Osvaldo Mars =

1921 film

- Directed by: Guido Brignone
- Produced by: Eleuterio Rodolfi
- Starring: Mercedes Brignone; Domenico Serra; Giovanni Cimara
- Cinematography: Anchise Brizzi
- Production company: Rodolfifilm
- Distributed by: Rodolfifilm
- Release date: June 1921
- Running time: 56 minutes
- Country: Italy
- Languages: Silent; Italian intertitles

The Painting of Osvaldo Mars (Italian: Il quadro di Osvaldo Mars) is a 1921 Italian silent drama film directed by Guido Brignone and starring Mercedes Brignone, Domenico Serra and Giovanni Cimara.

== Synopsis ==
A countess, discovering that a painting of her provocatively dressed as Salome by the artist Osvaldo Mars is to be publicly exhibited, slashes the canvas. When he is found dead soon afterwards she is suspected of his murder.

== Cast ==
- Mercedes Brignone as Contessa Anna Maria di San Giusto
- Domenico Serra as Osvaldo Mars, il pittore
- Giovanni Cimara as Conte di San Giusto
- François-Paul Donadio as Cameriere
- Armand Pouget as Ispettore Rull

== Bibliography ==
- Ágnes Pethő. The Cinema of Sensations. Cambridge Scholars Publishing, 2015.
