= L'Eclisse =

1962 film by Michelangelo Antonioni

- Theatrical release poster
- Directed by: Michelangelo Antonioni
- Written by: Michelangelo Antonioni; Tonino Guerra; Elio Bartolini (Note: Collaboration); Ottiero Ottieri
- Produced by: Robert and Raymond Hakim
- Starring: Alain Delon; Monica Vitti; Francisco Rabal; Lilla Brignone; Louis Seigner
- Cinematography: Gianni Di Venanzo
- Edited by: Eraldo Da Roma
- Music by: Giovanni Fusco
- Production companies: Interopa Film; Cineriz; Paris Film Production
- Distributed by: Cineriz (Italy); CFDC (France)
- Release dates: 12 April 1962 (Italy); 25 August 1962 (France)
- Running time: 126 minutes
- Countries: Italy; France
- Languages: Italian; English
- Box office: ₤305 million (Italy)

L'Eclisse (English: "The Eclipse") is a 1962 romantic drama film co-written and directed by Michelangelo Antonioni and starring Alain Delon and Monica Vitti, with Francisco Rabal, Lilla Brignone, and Louis Seigner. Filmed on location in Rome and Verona, the story follows a young woman (Vitti) who pursues an affair with a confident young stockbroker (Delon). Antonioni attributed some of his inspiration for L'Eclisse to when he filmed a solar eclipse in Florence. The film is considered the last part of a trilogy and is preceded by L'Avventura (1960) and La Notte (1961).

L'Eclisse won the Special Jury Prize at the 1962 Cannes Film Festival and was nominated for the Palme d'Or. Described by Martin Scorsese as the boldest film in the trilogy, it is one of the director's more acclaimed works. In 2008, the film was included on the Italian Ministry of Cultural Heritage’s 100 Italian films to be saved, a list of 100 films that "have changed the collective memory of the country between 1942 and 1978."

== Plot ==
On a Monday morning in July 1961, Vittoria, a young literary translator, ends her relationship with Riccardo in his apartment in the EUR residential district of Rome, following a long night of conversation. Riccardo tries to persuade her to stay, but she tells him she no longer loves him and leaves. As she wanders the deserted streets, Riccardo catches up and walks with her through a wooded area to her apartment building, where they say their final goodbyes.

Vittoria visits her mother at the frantic Rome Stock Exchange. A young stockbroker, Piero, overhears an inside tip, rushes to purchase the stocks, and then sells them at a large profit. He introduces himself to Vittoria; he is her mother's stockbroker. Outside the building, Vittoria attempts to tell her mother about her recent breakup, but her mother is preoccupied with her earned profits.

That evening, Vittoria's neighbor Anita comes to visit and they discuss the former's breakup. Another neighbor, Marta, calls and invites them to her apartment nearby. A white colonialist from Kenya, Marta refers to the natives as "monkeys" and believes they are threatening the white minorities. Vittoria dons blackface and mimics an African tribal dance until Marta, unamused, asks her to stop. When Marta's dog Zeus escapes from the apartment, the women chase after him. Later, Riccardo calls for Vittoria outside her apartment, but she hides and does not answer.

The next day, Vittoria accompanies Anita and her husband on a trip to Verona. Meanwhile, back at the Rome Stock Exchange, Piero is busy making trades. Vittoria arrives at the Stock Exchange and learns that her mother has lost approximately 10 million lire due to a stock market crash. She encounters Piero, who drives her to her mother's apartment in his Alfa Romeo Giulietta sports car. She shows him framed family pictures and her room growing up. Piero tries to kiss her, but she refuses. Piero drives back to his office, where he must break the bad news to his investors.

After work, Piero meets with a call girl he previously arranged to meet, but sends her away upon finding that she has dyed her blonde hair a darker color. He then drives to Vittoria's building and stands outside her apartment. Vittoria comes out to her balcony, and while they are talking, a drunk man steals Piero's sports car. The next morning, Vittoria and Piero meet by a lake and watch as a crane lifts the car with the drunk man's dead body out of the water. After a long walk, they arrive at a building under construction near Vittoria's apartment building. Piero again tries to kiss her, but she pulls away and heads home. That evening, Vittoria calls Piero but says nothing; thinking it is a prank call, he yells into the phone and slams down the receiver.

The next day, while Vittoria is waiting by the construction site, Piero arrives and tells her he has bought a new BMW to replace his Alfa Romeo. He takes her to his parents' apartment, which is filled with paintings and sculptures. As they talk, she seems nervous and unwilling to open up to him. They eventually kiss, and after he accidentally tears her dress, she goes into a bedroom and looks at his old family pictures. Piero comes to the bedroom, and they have sex.

Vittoria and Piero are lying on a hill. When he brings up marriage, she asserts that she does not miss it, even though she has never been married. He then grows frustrated with her inability to express how she feels about him, to which she responds, "I wish I didn't love you or that I loved you much more." Some time later at his office, Vittoria and Piero are making out and frolicking on a couch. When an alarm goes off, they prepare to part. They embrace and discuss seeing each other every day. They agree to meet that evening at 8 pm at the "usual place" outside the construction site, and Vittoria leaves. That evening, on Sunday, 10 September 1961, neither shows up at the designated meeting place. (Note: The final sequence contains images that were presented earlier in the film: a nurse with a child, a horse-drawn buggy, a man crossing a street, trees rustling in the wind, water running from a barrel, people waiting for a bus at a bus stop, sprinklers going off, a blonde woman walking by, a piece of wood floating in a water barrel, and people coming home from work. The sky grows dark, and the street lights come on.)

== Cast ==
- Alain Delon as Piero
- Monica Vitti as Vittoria
- Francisco Rabal as Riccardo
- Lilla Brignone as Vittoria's mother
- Rossana Rory as Anita
- Mirella Ricciardi as Marta
- Louis Seigner as Ercoli

== Production ==
=== Filming locations ===
- Rome Stock Exchange, Rome, Lazio, Italy
- Rome, Lazio, Italy
- Verona, Veneto, Italy

== Release ==
=== Box office ===
On its theatrical run in Italy, L'Eclisse grossed a total of 305 million lire. In France, the film had 470,764 admissions.

=== Reception ===
While Antonioni's earlier film L'Avventura had been derided upon its 1960 premiere, it was quickly reevaluated to the extent that L'Eclisse became "the most eagerly awaited film of the 1962 Cannes Film Festival"; critics had begun to believe that Antonioni's approach "was perhaps one way forward for an artform that was in danger of endlessly repeating itself". L'Eclisse won the Special Jury Prize at the festival and was nominated for the Palme d'Or (Golden Palm).

It is today considered one of Antonioni's more important works. David Sin wrote: "The intervening years appear not to have diminished its impact as an innovative work of cinema, nor as a wider critique of the age in which we live. The film retains a formal playfulness, with its open form offering different ways of watching and projecting onto the characters...and the overall atmosphere of ennui, so beautifully constructed through sound and image, still feels heavily familiar". Peter Bradshaw of The Guardian called the film "visionary" and argued "Antonioni opens up a sinkhole of existential dismay in the Roman streets and asks us to drop down into it. What a strange and brilliant film it is".

The final sequence is especially praised, with Jonathan Rosenbaum and others regarding it as one of the more effective scenes in Antonioni's oeuvre. Director Martin Scorsese, in his documentary about Italian films titled My Voyage to Italy, describes how the film haunted and inspired him as a young moviegoer, noting it seemed to him a "step forward in storytelling" and "felt less like a story and more like a poem". He adds that the ending is "a frightening way to end a film...but at the time it also felt liberating. The final seven minutes of Eclipse suggested to us that the possibilities in cinema were absolutely limitless". In the 2012 Sight & Sound polls conducted by the British Film Institute, L'Eclisse was voted in both the critics' and directors' polls as one of the 100 greatest films of all time.

Nevertheless, disapproval of the work has occasionally been voiced. Film critic Robin Wood complained that this and all films made by Antonioni after L'Avventura were "self-indulgent", "defeatist" and a "retreat into a fundamentally complacent despair". Jon Lisi of PopMatters criticized the work as "strictly intellectual" in its returns to the viewer and wrote that viewing the film "isn't exactly like watching paint dry, but the pace is so deliberately slow that it might as well be". Lisi dubbed L'Eclisse "beautifully made, historically important, and boring as hell". Conversely, Susan Doll wrote that if Antonioni's works are "out of vogue with movie goers captivated by postmodern irony and fast-paced editing...we are the worse for it. His work reflected not only a major change in Italian society but also a profound shift in film culture. His visually driven style and provocative approach to narrative raised the bar of what constituted popular filmmaking, and audiences at the time rose to the occasion to embrace it".

On the review aggregator website Rotten Tomatoes, 87% of 30 critics' reviews are positive, with an average rating of 8.1/10. The film was included in BBC's 2018 list of the 100 greatest foreign language films, ranked by 209

film critics from 43 countries.

== See also ==
- Michelangelo Antonioni filmography
