= Eternal Melodies =

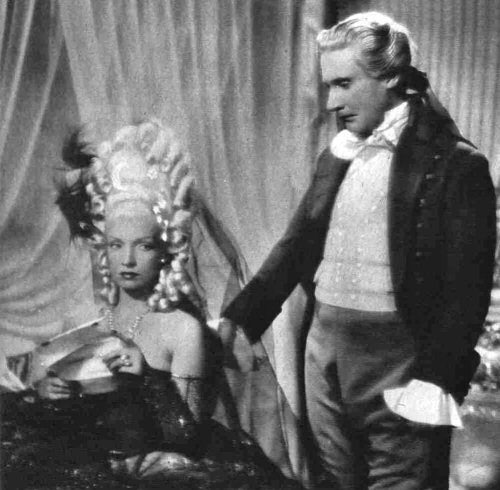
- Directed by: Carmine Gallone
- Written by: Guido Cantini; Ernst Marischka; Carmine Gallone
- Produced by: Giuseppe Amato
- Starring: Gino Cervi; Conchita Montenegro; Luisella Beghi; Maria Jacobini
- Cinematography: Anchise Brizzi
- Edited by: Niccolò Lazzari
- Music by: Alessandro Cicognini; Luigi Ricci
- Production company: ENIC
- Distributed by: ENIC
- Release date: 3 December 1940
- Running time: 97 minutes
- Country: Italy
- Language: Italian

Eternal Melodies (Italian: Melodie eterne) is a 1940 Italian historical drama film directed by Carmine Gallone and starring Gino Cervi, Conchita Montenegro and Luisella Beghi. It was one of several musical biopics directed by Gallone. The film was shot at Cinecittà in Rome.

== Synopsis ==
The film is a heavily fictionalized account of the life of the Austrian composer Wolfgang Amadeus Mozart (1756–1791).

== Cast ==
- Gino Cervi as Wolfgang Amadeus Mozart
- Conchita Montenegro as Aloisia Weber Lange
- Luisella Beghi as Costanza Weber Mozart
- Maria Jacobini as Anna Maria Mozart
- Jone Salinas as Nannina Mozart
- Luigi Pavese as Leopoldo Mozart
- Paolo Stoppa as Haibl, clarinettista
- Lauro Gazzolo as Il locandiere Deiner
- Claudio Gora as L'imperatore Giuseppe
- Olga Vittoria Gentilli as L'imperatrice Maria Teresa
- Margherita Bagni as Signora Weber
- Marisa Vernati as Sofia Weber
- Armida Bonocore as Giuseppina Weber
- Giulio Donadio as L'impresario Schikaneder
- Augusto Marcacci as Il musicista Salieri
- Sandro Ruffini as Il gentiluomo che commissiona il 'Requiem'
- Giulio Stival as Il tenore Giuseppe Lange
- Romolo Costa as Il compositore Schröder
- Carlo Duse as Il conte Arco
- Cesare Polacco as Haydn
- Alfredo Martinelli as Il signore invidioso
- Giuseppe Varni as Un detrattore
- Franco Pesce as Il direttore di scena

== Bibliography ==
- Moliterno, Gino. Historical Dictionary of Italian Cinema. Scarecrow Press, 2008.
