= Disturbance (1942 film) =

1942 film by Guido Brignone

- Directed by: Guido Brignone
- Written by: Guido Cantini
- Starring: Renzo Ricci; Mariella Lotti; Luisella Beghi
- Cinematography: Arturo Gallea
- Edited by: Ines Donarelli
- Music by: Carlo Innocenzi
- Production company: Euro International Film
- Distributed by: Euro International Film
- Release date: 1 March 1942
- Running time: 86 minutes
- Country: Italy
- Language: Italian

Disturbance (Italian: Turbamento) is a 1942 Italian drama film directed by Guido Brignone and starring Renzo Ricci, Mariella Lotti and Luisella Beghi. It was shot at the Cinecittà Studios in Rome. The film's sets were designed by the art director Guido Fiorini.

== Cast ==
- Renzo Ricci as Il marchese Ippolito
- Mariella Lotti as Silvia
- Luisella Beghi as Adriana
- Sergio Tofano as Antonio, padre di Silvia
- Elvira Betrone as Bice, madre di Silvia
- Giuseppe Rinaldi as Saverio, il musicista
- Aroldo Tieri as Aurelio
- Pino Locchi as Giovanni
- Tina Lattanzi as La contessa di Greve

== Bibliography ==
- Enrico Lancia & Roberto Poppi. Le attrici: dal 1930 ai giorni nostri. Gremese Editore, 2003.
