= The Betrothed (1923 film) =

1923 film directed by Mario Bonnard

- Directed by: Mario Bonnard
- Written by: Alessandro Manzoni (novel); Mario Bonnard
- Produced by: Bonnard Film
- Starring: Domenico Serra; Nini Dinelli; Emilia Vidali; Raimondo Van Riel
- Cinematography: Giuseppe Paolo Vitrotti
- Production company: Bonnard Film
- Distributed by: Bonnard Film
- Release date: 1923
- Running time: 140 minutes
- Country: Italy
- Languages: Silent; Italian intertitles

The Betrothed (Italian: I promessi sposi) is a 1923 Italian silent historical drama film directed by Mario Bonnard and starring Domenico Serra, Nini Dinelli and Emilia Vidali. It is an adaptation of the 1827 novel The Betrothed by Alessandro Manzoni.

== Plot ==
The Betrothed (1923)

Lake Como: Renzo and Lucia are two farmers who are in love. But the cruel and despotic Don Rodrigo impairs their marriage because he is secretly in love with Lucia. The two have to flee from their Lombard village, and shelter by different routes: Renzo goes to Milan and Lucia in a convent in Monza. Even the plague of 1600 contributes to the prolongation of the separation of the two lovers, who eventually find themselves in a hospital in Milan.

== Cast ==
- Emilia Vidali as Lucia
- Domenico Serra as Renzo
- Ninì Dinelli as la monaca di Monza
- Mario Parpagnoli as Don Rodrigo
- Rodolfo Badaloni as l'Innominato
- Umberto Scalpellini as Don Abbondio
- Ida Carloni Talli as Agnese
- Raimondo Van Riel as il Griso
- Olga Capri as Perpetua
- Enzo Biliotti as frà Cristoforo
- Bonaventura Ibáñez

== Bibliography ==
- Buonanno, Milly. Italian TV Drama and Beyond: Stories from the Soil, Stories from the Sea. Intellect Books, 2012.
