= Adorabili e bugiarde =

1958 film directed by Nunzio Malasomma

- Directed by: Nunzio Malasomma
- Written by: Alfredo Angeli; Sandro Continenza; Nunzio Malasomma; Giuseppe Mariani
- Starring: Isabelle Corey; Ingeborg Schöner; Eloisa Cianni
- Cinematography: Tonino Delli Colli
- Edited by: Jolanda Benvenuti
- Music by: Lelio Luttazzi
- Release date: 8 August 1958
- Country: Italy
- Language: Italian

Adorabili e bugiarde (also known as Adorable and a Liar) is a 1958 Italian crime comedy film directed by Nunzio Malasomma. The film was later re-released as Ragazze brivido and Assassino col botto.

== Plot ==
Three beautiful girls, a model, a journalist and a painter, eager for celebrity at all costs, decide to stage a fake murder to attract the attention of the press. At some point, one of them really disappears, being found only after many vicissitudes. The three young women understand that it is better to live a quiet life far from the spotlight.

== Cast ==
- Isabelle Corey: Anna Pelti
- Ingeborg Schöner: Paola Brini
- Eloisa Cianni: Marisa Dalli
- Franco Fabrizi: Geronti
- Paolo Ferrari: Carlo
- Nino Manfredi: Mario
- Rick Battaglia: Giorgio Pitagora
- Roberto Risso: Gino Gorni
- Franco Silva: police commissioner
- Loris Gizzi: court clerk
- Enrico Glori: Donatello
- Carlo Tamberlani: chief editor
- Lauro Gazzolo: president of the tribunal
- Edoardo Toniolo: instruction judge
- Manlio Busoni: public attorney
- Carlo Delle Piane: Nasone
- Nando Bruno: concierge
- Anita Durante: concierge's wife
- Giacomo Furia: Primo Fiorenzi
- Franco Giacobini: assistente costumista
