= Marisa Vernati =

Italian actress (1920–1988)

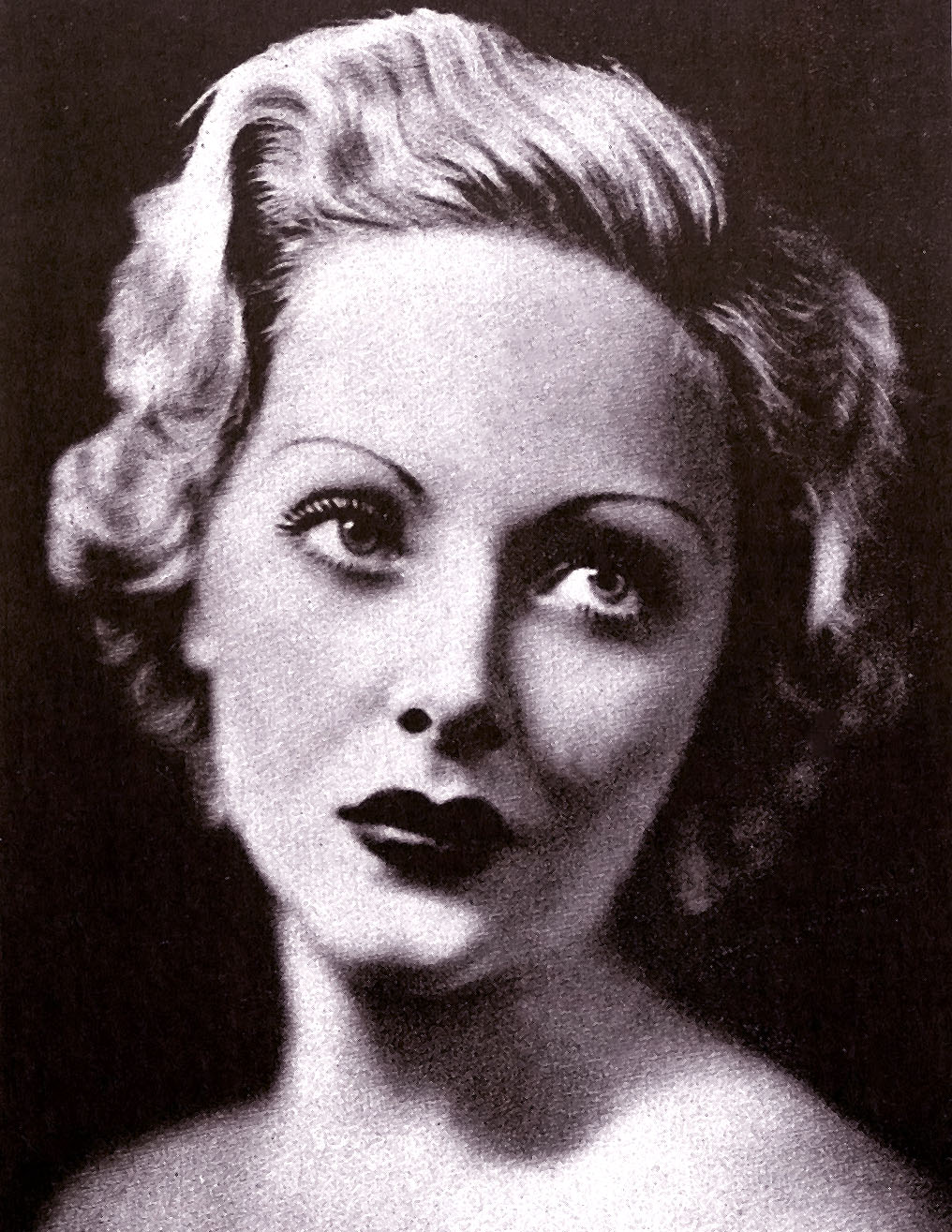
- Marisa Vernati
- Born: 21 June 1920; Rome, Italy
- Died: 1 February 1988 (aged 67); Rome, Italy
- Occupation: Actress
- Years active: 1937–1955

Marisa Vernati (21 June 1920 – 1 February 1988) was an Italian actress.

Born in Rome, Vernati was helped by her aunt soprano Luisa Tetrazzini to enter the world of entertainment, starting with small roles in films directed by Raffaello Matarazzo and Camillo Mastrocinque. Her film career was mainly limited to stereotyped roles of a femme fatale or seductress in sentimental melodramas and romantic comedies. Her career on stage was more successful, as Vernati was the prima donna in several successful revues, with the companies of Nino Taranto, Tino Scotti and Fanfulla, among others. In 1947, after her marriage to an Iranian doctor, she followed her husband who for professional reasons had to move to Turkey. Once returned, she resumed her activities in films, theater and radio, and then she retired to private life in the mid-1950s.

== Selected filmography ==
- It Was I! (1937)
- Departure (1938)
- I Want to Live with Letizia (1938)
- Eternal Melodies (1940)
- Two Suffer Better Than One (1943)
- Down with Misery (1945)
- Crime News (1947)
- My Beautiful Daughter (1950)
- Peppino e la vecchia signora (1954)
