= Guido Cantini =

Italian screenwriter

- Born: 9 April 1889; Livorno, Tuscany, Italy
- Died: 1 January 1945 (aged 55); Rome, Lazio, Italy
- Occupation: Screenwriter
- Years active: 1920-1943 (film)

Guido Cantini (9 April 1889 – 1 January 1945) was an Italian playwright and screenwriter.

== Selected filmography ==
- The Wedding March (1934)
- The Carnival Is Here Again (1937)
- The Dream of Butterfly (1939)
- Eternal Melodies (1940)
- Antonio Meucci (1940)
- Manon Lescaut (1940)
- Beyond Love (1940)
- Love Me, Alfredo! (1940)
- Disturbance (1942)
- La signorina (1942)
- The Two Orphans (1942)
- Maria Malibran (1943)

== Bibliography ==
- Mancini, Elaine. Struggles of the Italian film industry during fascism, 1930-1935. UMI Research Press, 1985.
