= Elvira Betrone =

Italian actress (1881–1961)

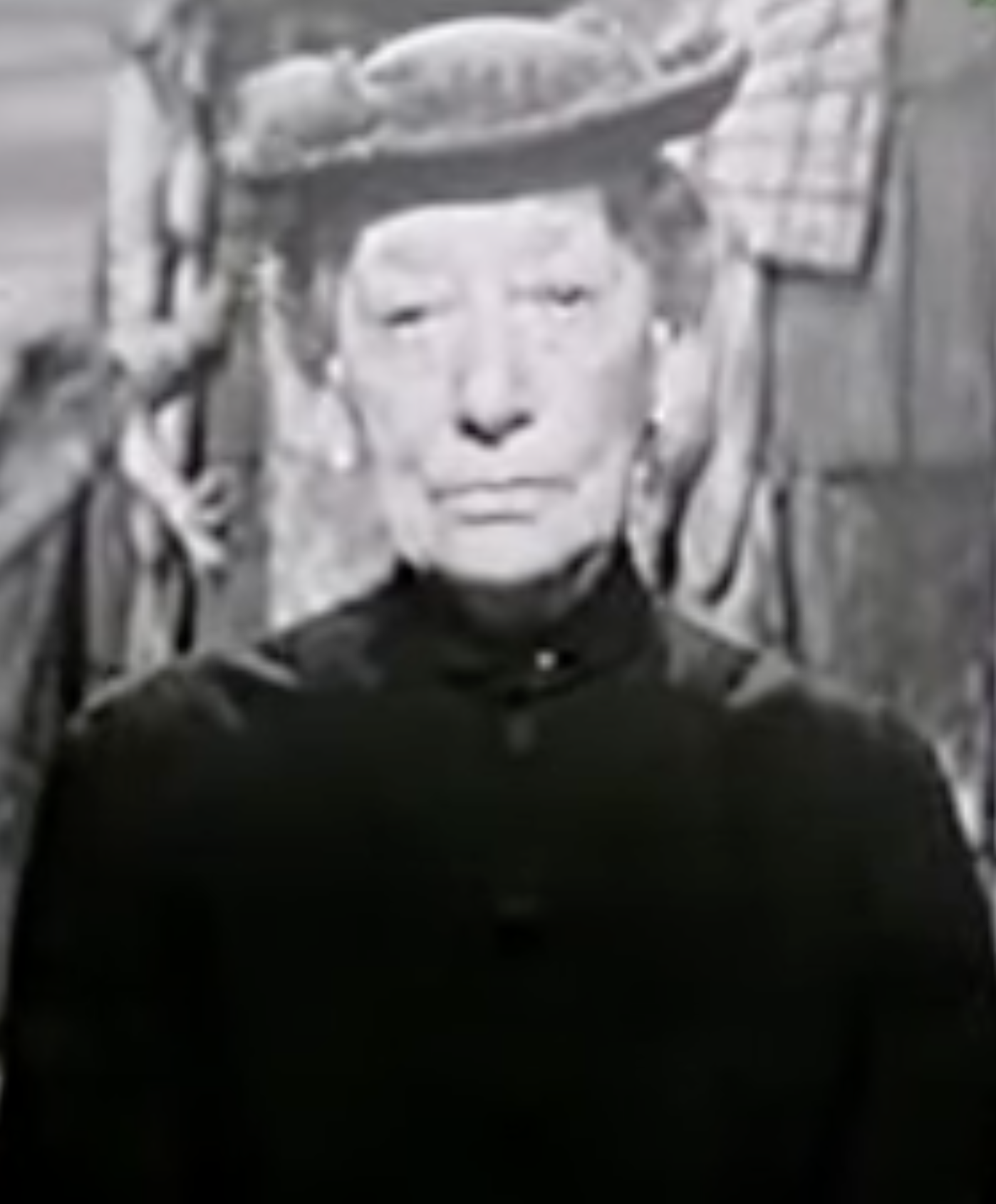
- Betrone in 1959
- Born: 6 February 1881; Rome, Lazio, Italy
- Died: 11 August 1961 (aged 80); Milan, Lombardy, Italy
- Occupation: Actress
- Years active: 1940-1959 (film)

Elvira Betrone (1881–1961) was an Italian actress of stage, film, radio and television.

== Selected filmography ==
- Teresa Venerdì (1941)
- A Garibaldian in the Convent (1942)
- A Pilot Returns (1942)
- The Little Teacher (1942)
- Disturbance (1942)
- Jealousy (1942)
- The Ten Commandments (1945)
- No Turning Back (1945)
- Il Brigante Musolino (1950)
- The Ungrateful Heart (1951)

== Bibliography ==
- Bert Cardullo. Vittorio De Sica: Director, Actor, Screenwriter. McFarland, 2002.
