= The Adventuress from the Floor Above =

- Directed by: Raffaello Matarazzo
- Written by: Edoardo Anton; Riccardo Freda; Margherita Maglione; Vittorio De Sica; Raffaello Matarazzo
- Produced by: Francesco Curato; Giorgio Genesi
- Starring: Vittorio De Sica; Clara Calamai; Giuditta Rissone; Olga Vittoria Gentilli
- Cinematography: Tino Santoni
- Edited by: Riccardo Freda
- Music by: Giuseppe Anepeta
- Production company: Artisti Associati
- Distributed by: Artisti Associati
- Release date: 21 October 1941
- Running time: 80 minutes
- Country: Italy
- Language: Italian

The Adventuress from the Floor Above (Italian: L'avventuriera del piano di sopra) is a 1941 Italian "white-telephones" comedy film directed by Raffaello Matarazzo and starring Vittorio De Sica, Clara Calamai and Giuditta Rissone. It was made at the Palatino Studios in Rome. The film was part of the popular White Telephone genre of comedies.

== Synopsis ==
When his wife goes away to attend her sister's wedding, the young lawyer Fabrizio Marchini expects a quiet time at home. However that evening, a woman bursts into his apartment and demands refuge, claiming that her angry husband Signor Rossi is searching for her. He shelters her when the abrasive Rossi, who rents the apartment above, enters and demands to search the place. Once he is gone, she spends the night in his bed while he sleeps on the sofa. In the morning, however he discovers that both she and his wife's valuable pearl necklace have disappeared. With the assistance of a friend he attempts to track her down before his wife returns.

== Cast ==
- Vittorio De Sica as Fabrizio Marchini
- Clara Calamai as Biancamaria Rossi
- Giuditta Rissone as Clara Marchini
- Olga Vittoria Gentilli as La madre di biancamaria
- Camillo Pilotto as Rossi
- Carlo Campanini as Arturo
- Ernesto Almirante as Il padre de Biancamaria
- Giselda Gasperini as Lucrezia - la cameriera di Arturo
- Jucci Kellerman as La cameriera
- Dina Romano as Matilde

== Bibliography ==
- Moliterno, Gino. Historical Dictionary of Italian Cinema. Scarecrow Press, 2008.
