= Giovanni Cimara =

Italian film actor (1889–1970)

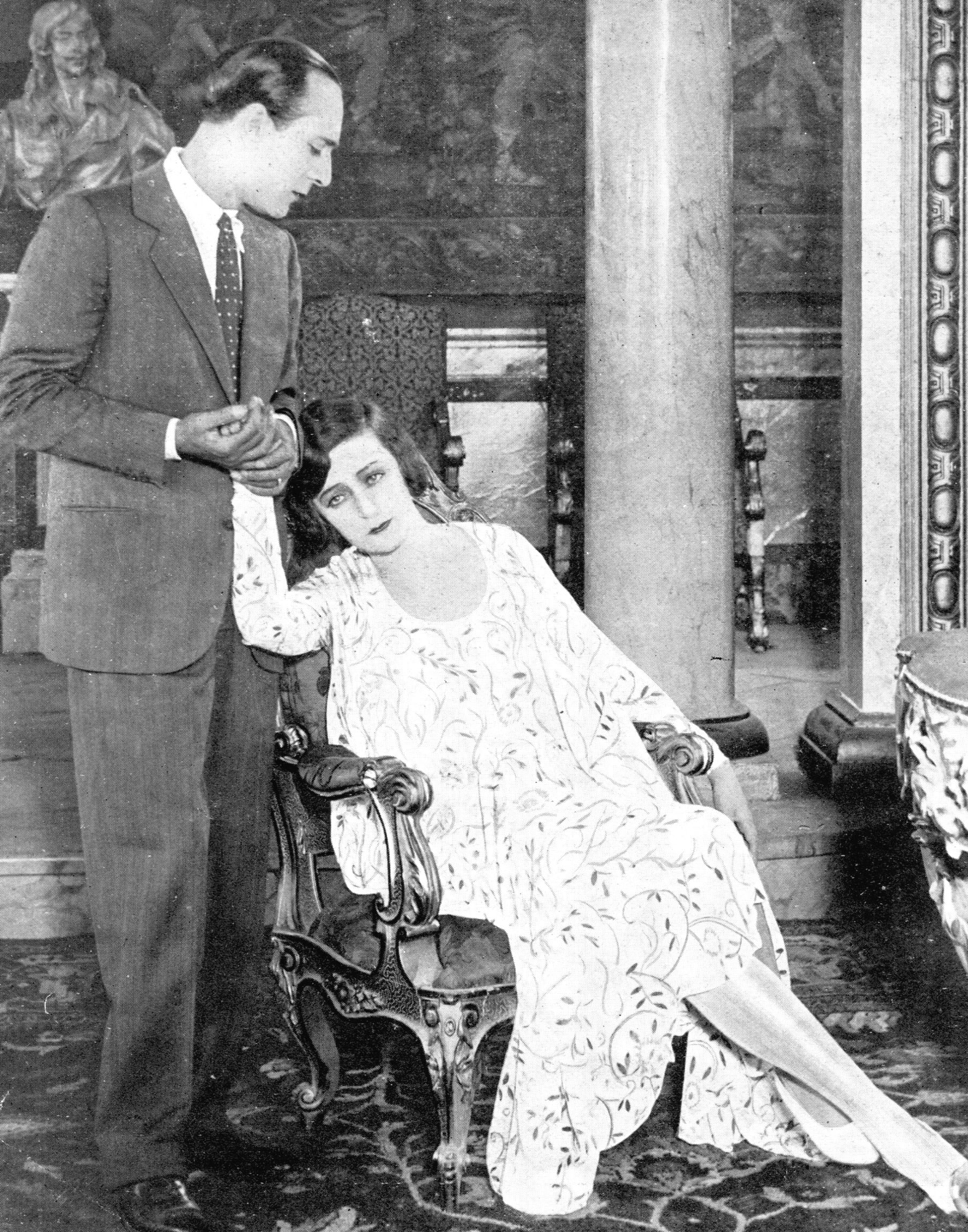
- Born: 1 February 1899; Rome, Lazio, Italy
- Died: 14 December 1970 (aged 71); Rome, Lazio, Italy
- Occupation: Actor
- Years active: 1913-1959 (film)

Giovanni Cimara (1889–1970) was an Italian film actor, mainly of the silent era.

== Biography ==
Born into a noble Roman family and brother of the much more famous Luigi Cimara, he had an unfortunate career as an actor at a young age but was later able to make up for himself by obtaining a first writing in the theater by the great Ermete Zacconi, to then move on to the company of Dina Gauls .

He was also very active in silent cinema where he made his debut in 1913 with a contract with the production company Latium and was later appreciated as the protagonist of films produced by the production house Pasquali Film and Edison Film, then from 1918 he worked for Ambrosio Film and finally, since 1921 with Silentium Film and Rodolfi Film .

At that time he appeared in important and highly successful films such as The Bloody Primroses of 1914, Ettore Fieramosca of 1915, Passione tsigana and La contessa Arsenia directed by Ernesto Maria Pasquali in 1916 . Then came The lover of the moon of 1919 (the film in two episodes) and golden Canaglia of 1921 (three episodes) until the vein of gold of 1930, directed by William Zorzi .

With the advent of sound, his participation in films thinned and in the thirties he joined EIAR where he became a renowned radio actor in a period in which prose through the radio was very popular. In 1933 he is Lisandro in A Midsummer Night's Dream by William Shakespeare directed by Max Reinhardt with Carlo Lombardi, Cele Abba, Nerio Bernardi, Rina Morelli, Sarah Ferrati, Cesare Bettarini, Armando Migliari, Ruggero Lupi, Luigi Almirante, Giuseppe Pierozzi, Memo Benassi, Evi Maltagliati and Eva Magni in the Boboli Gardens and Sinibaldo in the world premiere of The representation of Santa Uliva in the Great Cloister of the Basilica of Santa Croce in Florence with Morelli, Bettarini, Benassi, Andreina Pagnani, Lupi, Lombardi, Ferrati, Bernardi and Migliari directed by Jacques Copeau . In 1940 he was hired to play himself in the movie Here is the radio!, directed by Giacomo Gentilomo.

On the radio he continued to work assiduously even after the war, acting with the Company of the Teatro Comico Musicale in Rome directed by Riccardo Mantoni .

Cimara became, from 1946, for a certain period of acting teacher at the Free Academy of Art in Turin, appearing from time to time in secondary roles in some films of the forties and fifties : among these, Campo di Maggio, Catene invisibili and the bachelor of Antonio Pietrangeli of 1955 where it was next to Alberto Sordi .

He also returned, from time to time, to work in the theater.

He married twice, the first with the radio actress Lina Franceschi, then with Paola Fiorentini .

== Selected filmography ==
- The Painting of Osvaldo Mars (1921)
- The Two Sergeants (1922)
- The Golden Vein (1928)
- Before the Jury (1931)
- Queen of the Scala (1937)
- Pietro Micca (1938)
- Catene invisibili (1942)
- Cercasi bionda bella presenza (1942)
- La vita torna (1943)
- The Bachelor (1955)

== Bibliography ==
- Goble, Alan. The Complete Index to Literary Sources in Film. Walter de Gruyter, 1999.
