= Gianni Musy =

Italian actor and voice actor (1931–2011)

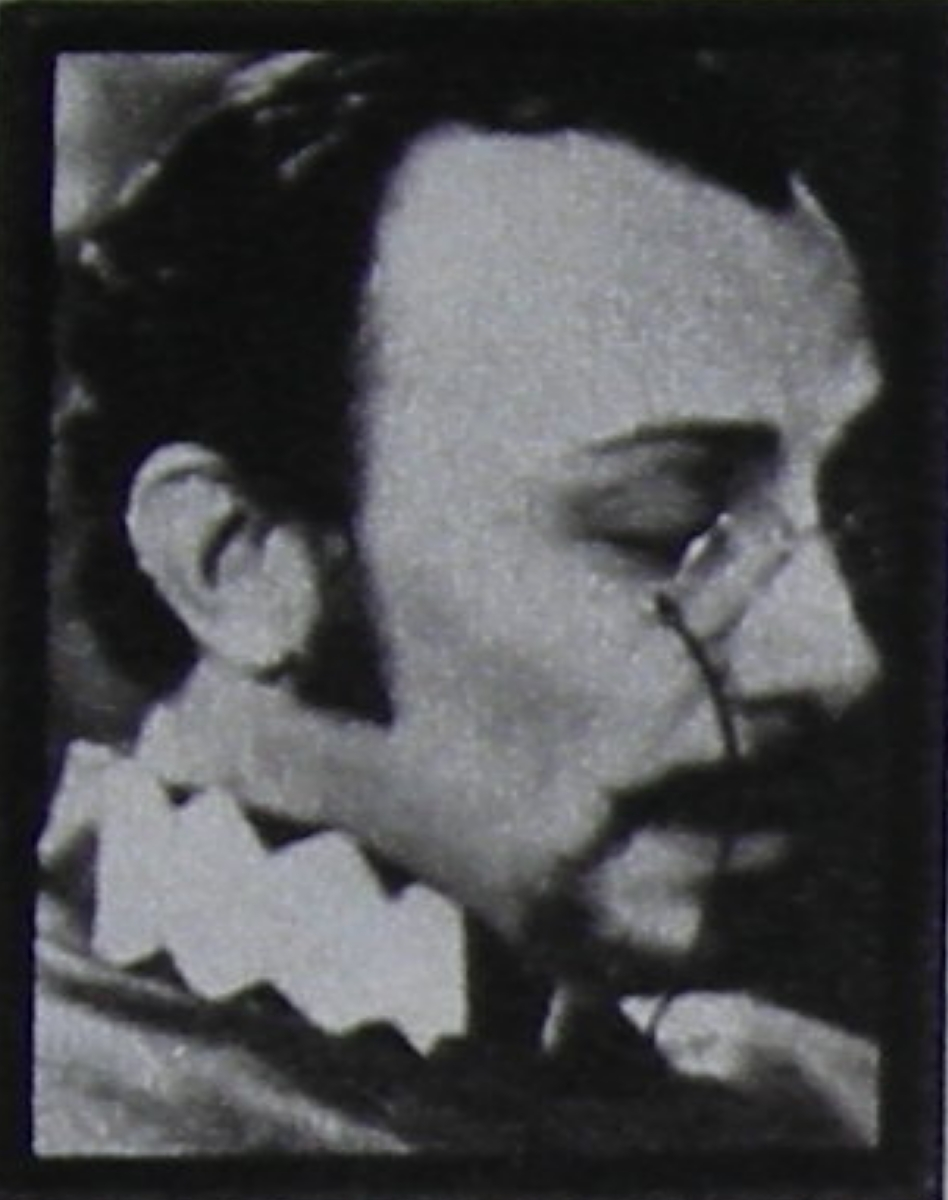
- Musy in I giorni dei Turbin (1969)
- Born: Giovanni Musy; 3 August 1931; Milan, Italy
- Died: 7 October 2011 (aged 80); Mentana, Italy
- Other names: Gianni Glori; Gianni Musy Glori
- Occupations: Actor; voice actor; dubbing director; lyricist
- Years active: 1942–2011
- Spouse: Rada Rassimov
- Children: Mascia; Stella
- Father: Enrico Glori

Giovanni "Gianni" Musy (3 August 1931 – 7 October 2011) was an Italian actor and voice actor.

== Biography ==
Born in Milan, the son of actors Enrico Glori and Gianna Pacetti, he started working as a child actor at eleven years old and studied at the Accademia di Belle Arti in his hometown. Starting from the late 1950s, Musy began an intense activity as a character actor, often being cast in villainous roles. Musy became best known through his television work, notably the RAI TV series La freccia nera, Le inchieste del commissario Maigret, E le stelle stanno a guardare and Dov'è Anna?. Also remembered for playing distinctive characters in some of his film work, in 1993 Musy portrayed Sicilian mafioso Tommaso Buscetta in Giuseppe Ferrara's film Giovanni Falcone; despite panning the end result, critics still praised the actors.

Musy was also very active and appreciated as a voice dubbing artist. He provided the Italian-dubbed voice of Dumbledore (portrayed by Richard Harris and Michael Gambon) in the Harry Potter film franchise as well as Gandalf (portrayed by Ian McKellen) in The Lord of the Rings. He sometimes dubbed actors such as Charlton Heston, Christopher Plummer, and George Peppard. In his animated roles, Musy voiced Giuseppe Garibaldi in the Italian film L'eroe dei due mondi, directed by Guido Manuli in 1994 and served as the Italian voice of Zeus in Hercules and Billy Bones in Treasure Planet.

Musy died before being able to post-synchronize his own dialogue for his final film role, so in The Day of the Siege: September Eleven 1683 Sergio Graziani's voice is heard instead of his.

=== Personal life ===
From his marriage to actress Rada Rassimov, he had two daughters, Mascia, who works as a stage actress, and Stella, who works as a voice dubbing actress.

== Death ==
Musy died in Mentana of a long illness on October 7, 2011 at the age of 80.

== Filmography ==
=== Cinema ===
Year	Title	Role	Notes
1942	Black Gold	Young Nicola	
1943	Harlem	Tony Rossi	
1947	Angelina	Libero Bianchi	Credited as "Gianni Glori"
1949	Sicilian Uprising		Credited as "Gianni Glori"
1950	Side Street Story	Amedeo Iovine	Credited as "Gianni Glori"
1950	The Cadets of Gascony	Nino Quaranta	Credited as "Gianni Glori"
1951	Strano appuntamento		Credited as "Gianni Glori"
1951	Il caimano del Piave	Goffredo	Credited as "Gianni Glori"
1951	Filumena Marturano	Riccardo	
1952	Toto and the King of Rome	Giorgio	
1952	Who Is Without Sin	Dario	
1952	The Island's Sinner	Rosario	Credited as "Gianni Glori"
1952	Una croce senza nome		
1952	The Man in My Life	Alberto Grino	
1953	Nero and the Burning of Rome		
1953	Siamo tutti milanesi	Mario	Credited as "Gianni Glori"
1954	La Luciana	Vincenzo	
1955	Na sera 'e maggio	Riccardo	
1958	Caporale di giornata	Felice Corradini	
1959	The Facts of Murder	Retalli	
1959	Desert Desperadoes	Fabius	Credited as "Gianni Glori"
1960	Love in Rome		
1961	Mariti a congresso	Glori	
1961	His Women	Nando Marcellini	
1961	Duel of the Titans	Romolo’s partner	
1962	Jessica	Filippo Casabranca	
1966	The Man Who Laughs	Paolo Orsini	
1972	Decameron proibitissimo	Agilulfo	
1972	Come fu che Masuccio Salernitano	Frate Partenope	
1972	Le notti peccaminose di Pietro l'Aretino	Painter	
1973	The Boss	Carlo Attardi	
1975	Due Magnum 38 per una città di carogne	Piero Turchi	
1975	La verginella	Stefano	
1975	Il sogno di Zorro	General Ruarte	
1977	The Cynic, the Rat and the Fist	Nicola Proietti	
1979	The Gang That Sold America	Gitto Cardone	
1981	Ace	Announcer	
1983	State buoni se potete	The Prince	
1983	O surdato 'nnammurato		
1985	Bank Clerks	Pozzi	
1988	Compagni di scuola	Piero's father-in-law	
1991	Faccione	Daniela and Giuseppe's father	
1993	Giovanni Falcone	Tommaso Buscetta	
1998	Dangerous Beauty	Joseph	
2001	Stregati dalla luna	Miria’s father	
2004	Don't Move	Elsa’s father	
2005	L'eretico - Un gesto di coraggio		
2012	Piazza Fontana: The Italian Conspiracy	Confessor of Moro	Posthumous release
2012	The Day of the Siege: September Eleven 1683	Carlo Cristofori	Posthumous release

=== Television ===
Year	Title	Role	Notes
1962	Angelina mia		TV film
1964	I grandi camaleonti	Freron	TV miniseries
1964–1972	Le inchieste del commissario Maigret	Inspector Lapointe	Main cast
1968	La freccia nera	Will "Senzalegge"	TV miniseries
1969	I giorni dei Turbin	Talberg	TV film
1971	E le stelle stanno a guardare	Dick Jobey	TV miniseries
1972	La pietra di Luna	Luker	TV miniseries
1973	Qui squadra mobile		1 episode (season 1x06)
1975	Murat		TV miniseries
1978	Storie della camorra		TV miniseries
1979	Il signore di Ballantrae	Tam Macmorland	TV miniseries
1980	L'eredità della priora	Anastasio	TV miniseries
1984	I racconti del maresciallo	Garaguso	TV miniseries
1987	Aeroporto internazionale		
1990	La piovra 5 - Il cuore del problema		TV miniseries
1995	Pazza famiglia	Victor	Recurring role (season 1)
1996	La tenda nera		TV film
1996	Il maresciallo Rocca	Passigli	1 episode (season 1x02)
1998	Professione fantasma	Camillo	1 episode (season 1x06)
2005	Elisa di Rivombrosa		Recurring role (season 2)
2007	Donna Detective		
2011	Cugino & cugino		1 episode (season 1x08)

== Voice work ==
Year	Title	Role	Notes
1993	The Secret of the Old Woods	Old Owl	Voice-over
1994	L'eroe dei due mondi (film 1994)	Giuseppe Garibaldi	Animated film
2002	Maria José - L'ultima regina	Radio announcer	Voice-over
2005	Autodidatta, Duilio Cambellotti racconta se stesso	Narrator	Documentary
2011	Oltre la frontiera	Narrator	Documentary

=== Dubbing ===
==== Films (Animation, Italian dub) ====
Year	Title	Role(s)	Ref
1976	The Twelve Tasks of Asterix	Abraracourcix	
1997	Hercules	Zeus	
1997	Neon Genesis Evangelion: Death & Rebirth	Keel Lorenz	
1997	The End of Evangelion	Keel Lorenz	
2001	Atlantis: The Lost Empire	Kashekim Nedakh	
2002	Treasure Planet	Billy Bones	
2007	Sword of the Stranger	Byakuran	
2007	Persepolis	God	
2007	Highlander: The Search for Vengeance	Amergan	
2010	Animals United	Winston	
2011	Rango	Tortoise John	
2011	The Smurfs	Papa Smurf	

==== Films (Live action, Italian dub) ====
Year	Title	Role(s)	Original actor	Ref
1968	Joanna	Lord Peter Sanderson	Donald Sutherland	
1970	Horror of the Blood Monsters	Dr. Rynning	John Carradine	
1976	Buffalo Bill and the Indians, or Sitting Bull's History Lesson	Ned Buntline	Burt Lancaster	
1980	Atlantic City	Lou Pascal	Burt Lancaster	
1981	Agency	Ted Quinn	Robert Mitchum	
1981	Escape from New York	Bob Hauk	Lee Van Cleef	
1982	Five Days One Summer	Douglas Meredith	Sean Connery	
1983	Local Hero	Felix Happer	Burt Lancaster	
1983	The Osterman Weekend	Maxwell Danforth	Burt Lancaster	
1986	The Night Is Young	Boris	Hugo Pratt	
1986	Round Midnight	Dale Turner	Dexter Gordon	
1986	Heartbreak Ridge	J. Choozhoo	Arlen Dean Snyder	
1988	Young Guns	Lawrence Murphy	Jack Palance	
1989	Batman	Carl Grissom	Jack Palance	
1990	The Field	'Bull' McCabe	Richard Harris	
1991	Prospero's Books	Prospero	John Gielgud	
1992	Christopher Columbus: The Discovery	Tomás de Torquemada	Marlon Brando	
1992	Unforgiven	English Bob	Richard Harris	
1992	The Last of the Mohicans	Chingachgook	Russell Means	
1993	Wrestling Ernest Hemingway	Frank	Richard Harris	
1993	Homeward Bound: The Incredible Journey	Shadow	Don Ameche	
1994	True Lies	Spencer Trilby	Charlton Heston	
1994	Intersection	Neal	Martin Landau	
1994	Natural Born Killers	Earl	Lanny Flaherty	
1995	Dolores Claiborne	John Mackey	Christopher Plummer	
1995	Cry, the Beloved Country	James Jarvis	Richard Harris	
1995	Casino	Pat Webb	L. Q. Jones	
1996	City Hall	Judge Walter Stern	Martin Landau	
1996	Homeward Bound II: Lost in San Francisco	Shadow	Ralph Waite	
1996	Hard Eight	Sydney	Philip Baker Hall	
1997	This Is the Sea	Old Man Jacobs	Richard Harris	
1997	The Game	Anson Baer	Armin Mueller-Stahl	
1997	Batman & Robin	Commissioner Gordon	Pat Hingle	
1997	The Brave	Lou Sr.	Frederic Forrest	
1998	The Barber of Siberia	Douglas McCracken	Richard Harris	
1998	Dancing at Lughnasa	Father Jack Mundy	Michael Gambon	
1999	Snow Falling on Cedars	Nels Gudmundsson	Max von Sydow	
1999	Star Wars: Episode I – The Phantom Menace	Ki-Adi-Mundi	Silas Carson	
1999	The Hurricane	H. Lee Sarokin	Rod Steiger	
1999	Any Given Sunday	AFFA Football Commissioner	Charlton Heston	
1999	The 13th Warrior	Hrothgar	Sven Wollter	
2000	Gladiator	Marcus Aurelius	Richard Harris	
2000	The Kid	Bob Riley	Stanley Anderson	
2001	Intacto	Samuel "Sam" Berg	Max von Sydow	
2001	Harry Potter and the Philosopher's Stone	Albus Dumbledore	Richard Harris	
2001	Planet of the Apes	Zaius	Charlton Heston	
2001	Amélie	Raymond Dufayel	Serge Merlin	
2001	The Majestic	Harry Trimble	Martin Landau	
2001	The Lord of the Rings: The Fellowship of the Ring	Gandalf	Ian McKellen	
2001	Don't Say a Word	Sydney Simon	Victor Argo	
2002	The Count of Monte Cristo	Abbé Faria	Richard Harris	
2002	Harry Potter and the Chamber of Secrets	Albus Dumbledore	Richard Harris	
2002	The Lord of the Rings: The Two Towers	Gandalf	Ian McKellen	
2002	Ararat	David	Christopher Plummer	
2002	Star Wars: Episode II – Attack of the Clones	Ki-Adi-Mundi	Silas Carson	
2002	Minority Report	Lamar Burgess	Max von Sydow	
2003	Cold Creek Manor	Theodore Massie	Christopher Plummer	
2003	The Lord of the Rings: The Return of the King	Gandalf	Ian McKellen	
2004	Harry Potter and the Prisoner of Azkaban	Albus Dumbledore	Michael Gambon	
2004	The Princess Diaries 2: Royal Engagement	Lord Palimore	Tom Poston	
2005	Oliver Twist	Mr. Brownlow	Edward Hardwicke	
2005	Must Love Dogs	William "Bill" Nolan	Christopher Plummer	
2005	The New World	Christopher Newport	Christopher Plummer	
2005	Syriana	Dean Whiting	Christopher Plummer	
2005	Star Wars: Episode III – Revenge of the Sith	Ki-Adi-Mundi	Silas Carson	
2005	The Interpreter	Edmond Zuwanie	Earl Cameron	
2005	Harry Potter and the Goblet of Fire	Albus Dumbledore	Michael Gambon	
2005	Manderlay	Wilhelm	Danny Glover	
2006	The Good Shepherd	Dr. Fredericks	Michael Gambon	
2006	Goya's Ghosts	Father Gregorio	Michael Lonsdale	
2007	Stardust	Narrator	Ian McKellen	
2007	Harry Potter and the Order of the Phoenix	Albus Dumbledore	Michael Gambon	
2007	The Golden Compass	First High Councillor	Christopher Lee	
2007	Surviving with Wolves	Jean	Guy Bedos	
2009	Harry Potter and the Half-Blood Prince	Albus Dumbledore	Michael Gambon	
2009	The Imaginarium of Doctor Parnassus	Doctor Parnassus	Christopher Plummer	
2010	I Want to Be a Soldier	Principal	Danny Glover	
2010	Harry Potter and the Deathly Hallows – Part 1	Albus Dumbledore	Michael Gambon	
2010	The Wolfman	Elderly man	Max von Sydow	
2010	Shutter Island	Dr. Naehring	Max von Sydow	
2010	Robin Hood	Sir Walter Loxley	Max von Sydow	
2010	The Next Three Days	George Brennan	Brian Dennehy	
2011	Harry Potter and the Deathly Hallows – Part 2	Albus Dumbledore	Michael Gambon	

==== Television (Animation, Italian dub) ====
Year	Title	Role(s)	Notes	Ref
1997–1998	Battle Angel Alita	Vector	Recurring role	
2000–2001	Neon Genesis Evangelion	Keel Lorenz	Recurring role	
2003	Cédric	Jules Boudinet	Recurring role (2nd voice)	
2004	New Fist of the North Star	Master	Episode 2	
2004	The Simpsons	Ian McKellen	1 episode (season 15x04)	

==== Television (Live action, Italian dub) ====
Year	Title	Role(s)	Notes	Original actor	Ref
1984–1985	The A-Team	John "Hannibal" Smith	Main cast (seasons 1–2)	George Peppard	
1985	Mussolini and I	Benito Mussolini	TV film	Bob Hoskins	
1991	The Cave of the Golden Rose	King	TV film	Mario Adorf	
1992	A Thousand Heroes	Al Haynes	TV film	Charlton Heston	
1992–1994	The Young Indiana Jones Chronicles	Indiana Jones (aged 93)	Main cast	George Hall	
1996	Alisea and the Dream Prince	Azaret	TV miniseries	Christopher Lee	
1997	The Princess and the Pauper	Epos	TV film	Max von Sydow	
1998	Merlin	Elderly Merlin	TV miniseries	Sam Neill	
2002	The Apocalypse	John the Apostle	TV film	Richard Harris	
2003	Julius Caesar	Lucius Sulla	TV miniseries	Richard Harris	
2003	Angels in America	Prior Walter Ancestor No. 1	TV miniseries	Michael Gambon	
2010	Doctor Who	Kazran / Elliot Sardick	1 episode	Michael Gambon	

==== Video games (Italian dub) ====
Year	Title	Role(s)	Ref
1997	Hercules	Zeus	
2003	The Lord of the Rings: The Return of the King	Gandalf	
2004	Sacred	Narrator	
