= Invisible Chains (film) =

1942 film

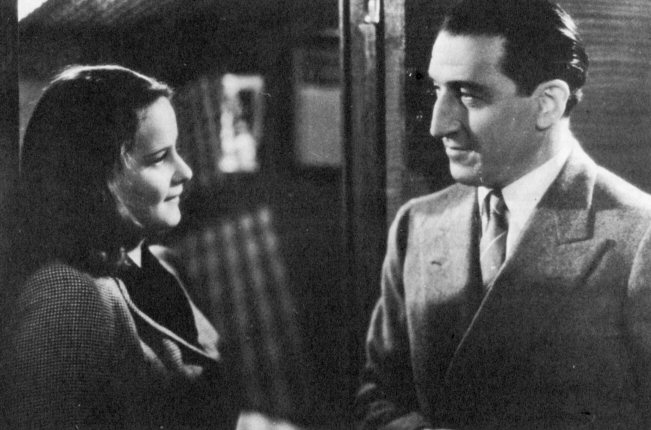
- Valli and Ninchi in a film scene
- Directed by: Mario Mattoli
- Written by: Aldo De Benedetti; Vittorio Malpassuti; Marcello Marchesi; Francesco Marturano; Mario Mattoli
- Produced by: Ettore Rosboch
- Starring: Alida Valli; Carlo Ninchi; Giuditta Rissone
- Cinematography: Anchise Brizzi
- Edited by: Fernando Tropea
- Music by: Carlo Innocenzi
- Production company: Italcine
- Distributed by: Industrie Cinematografiche Italiane
- Release date: 1 April 1942
- Running time: 90 minutes
- Country: Italy
- Language: Italian

Invisible Chains (Italian: Catene invisibili) is a 1942 Italian drama film directed by Mario Mattoli and starring Alida Valli, Carlo Ninchi and Giuditta Rissone. It was shot at the Cinecittà Studios in Rome. The film's sets were designed by the art directors Ottavio Scotti and Mario Rappini.

== Plot ==
Following the death of her industrialist father, a young socialite inherits his business empire. Discovering that she has an illegitimate half-brother, she tries to assist him by finding him employment in the factory, but his criminal behaviour lets her down. Finally, she finds love and companionship in the engineer who runs the factory on her behalf.

== Cast ==
- Alida Valli as Elena Silvagni
- Carlo Ninchi as Carlo Danieli
- Giuditta Rissone as La signora Matilde Silvagni
- Andrea Checchi as Enrico Leni, il fratellastro
- Jone Morino as La madre di Enrico
- Carlo Campanini as Cesare Tani
- Luigi Almirante as Un amico dei Silvagni
- Ada Dondini as La fioraia
- Armando Migliari as Il commissario
- Augusto Marcacci as Il direttore dell'albergo
- Arturo Bragaglia as Il cameriere di casa Tani
- Cesare Fantoni as Il maggiordomo di casa Silvagni
- Ciro Berardi as Giulio Berri
- Paolo Bonecchi as L'avvocato della querela
- Armida Bonocore as La segretaria di Danieli
- Giovanni Cimara as Un industriale di Milano
- Giorgio Costantini as Il mediatore
- Giovanni Dolfini as Il direttore della prigione
- Oreste Fares as Il notaio
- Adolfo Geri as Marini
- Virgilio Gottardi as Un amico tennista di Elena
- Delia Lancelotti as Un'amica di Elena
- Renato Malavasi as L'impiegato dell'albergo
- Nino Marchesini as Un membro del consiglio d'amministrazione
- Carlo Mariotti as Il segretario del commissario
- Patrizia Muller as Un' amica di Elena
- Giovanni Petrucci as Gino, il barista
- Aldo Pini as L'equivoco compagno di Enrico
- Mirella Scriatto as Daniela, la commessa fioraia
- Elide Spada as Claretta
- Umberto Spadaro as Un amico di Enrico al biliardo
- Gioconda Stari as Una cameriera di casa Silvagni
- Guido Verdiani as Il dottore Moretti
- Leonello Zanchi as Un impiegato di Danieli

== Bibliography ==
- Gundle, Stephen. Mussolini's Dream Factory: Film Stardom in Fascist Italy. Berghahn Books, 2013.
