= Two Suffer Better Than One =

1943 film directed by Nunzio Malasomma

- Directed by: Nunzio Malasomma
- Written by: Gaspare Cataldo; Mino Caudana; Nunzio Malasomma; Luigi Pesenti
- Produced by: Giulio Manenti
- Starring: Carlo Ninchi; Giuditta Rissone; Marisa Vernati
- Cinematography: Alberto Fusi
- Edited by: Gabriele Varriale
- Music by: Ezio Carabella
- Production company: Manenti Film
- Distributed by: Nazionalcine
- Release date: 21 April 1943
- Running time: 85 minutes
- Country: Italy
- Language: Italian

Two Suffer Better Than One (Italian: In due si soffre meglio) is a 1943 Italian comedy film directed by Nunzio Malasomma and starring Carlo Ninchi, Giuditta Rissone and Marisa Vernati. It was shot at the studios of the Centro Sperimentale di Cinematografia in Rome. The film's sets were designed by the art director Piero Filippone.

== Synopsis ==
A prosperous man loses his money and has only debts, so that his daughters need to make their own way in the world. One of them attempts a singing career while the other decides to try and snare a wealthy husband leading to a series of complications.

== Cast ==
- Carlo Ninchi as Roberto Lanzi
- Dedi Montano as Lucia Barduzzi
- Marisa Vernati as Giuliana Barduzzi
- Giuditta Rissone as La signora Barduzzi
- Carlo Micheluzzi as Il signor Barduzzi
- Carlo Campanini as Mario Motta
- Wanda Capodaglio as La signora Lanzi
- Tino Scotti as Il maggiordomo
- Tatiana Farnese as Marta
- Egisto Olivieri as L'investigatore privato
- Anna Maria Dionisi as La cameriera dei Barduzzi
- Tina Maver as La segretaria di Lanzi
- Armando Furlai as Ottavio

== Bibliography ==
- Casadio, Gianfranco. Opera e cinema: la musica lirica nel cinema italiano dall'avvento del sonoro ad oggi. Longo Editore, 1995.
- Ipsen, Carl David. Fumo: Italy's Love Affair with the Cigarette. Stanford University Press, 2016.
