= Mirella Ricciardi =

Kenyan-born photographer and author (born 1931)

- Born: Mirella Rocco; 14 July 1931 (age 95); Kenya
- Occupations: Photographer, primarily of African subjects Author; Adventurer
- Spouse: Lorenzo Ricciardi
- Children: 2
- Parent(s): Mario Rocco (1893–1975); Giselle Bunau-Varilla (1892–1978)

Mirella Ricciardi (born 14 July 1931) is a Kenyan-born photographer and author. She also appeared in Michelangelo Antonioni's 1962 film L'Eclisse, playing the part of a woman whose backstory bore some resemblance to her own.

== Early life ==
Mirella Rocco was born on 14 July 1931, the elder daughter of Mario Rocco (1893–1975) and Giselle Bunau-Varilla (1892–1978). Her father, originally from Naples, was an Italian cavalry officer who had taken part in the First World War. Her mother was a French-born sculptor who had once been a pupil of Rodin. Both her parents were married (but not to each other) when they set off for Africa at the end of 1928. They initially planned to elope in the Belgian Congo and make a fortune by killing elephants and selling the ivory. However, after a year-long safari Giselle became pregnant and the couple headed for Kenya to find a hospital. They finally settled in Kenya when Mirella's elder brother, Dorian Rocco (1930–2013), was born. The youngest of the three children, Orla, was born in 1933.

Mario Rocco acquired 5,000 acres on the shores of Lake Naivasha which he farmed. The children enjoyed the privileged childhood familiar to many "white" Kenyan contemporaries in the 1930s. When Mirella Rocco was just nine, and her father was forty-seven, the East African campaign came to Kenya in 1940. Since Kenya was then a British colony, Mario Rocco, as an Italian, was arrested and taken to a camp at Kabete, before being transferred to South Africa for four years.

For two years during the 1950s, Mirella Rocco undertook an internship in Paris with the fashion photographer Harry Meerson. In 1957, a press photograph of her sitting in front of a tourism poster for Uganda and Kenya, which was taken while she was visiting to New York, bore a caption stating that back in Kenya she had already "acted as cameraman, guide and hunter on more than 15 safaris". But it was evidently clear that it was the camera that piqued her interest.

On 26 May 1957, she appeared as the "mystery guest" on an episode of the American TV show What's My Line?

== Personal ==
Mirella Rocco married Lorenzo Ricciardi. They had met when he recruited her as the "stills photographer" in connection with a movie he was shooting in East Africa. Various sources describe Lorenzo Ricciardi as "an Italian adventurer." He has led much of his life pursued by a succession of seemingly fantastical anecdotes. Despite his Neapolitan familial provenance, he was reportedly born in a Milanese prison because there was insufficient time for his mother to reach the hospital. As a child, he had watched the Nazis burn down his family home. Later, he made significant money by playing roulette and purchased a boat and, used it to "sail through a string of monsoons" on an "ocean-going dhow". until it sank

In 1990, Lorenzo's brief relationship with Georgiana Bronfman (née Rita Webb), the former wife of Edgar Bronfman, Sr. (now married to actor Nigel Havers), led to him being arrested in 1990 after accusations by Ms. Bronfman for an argument after a regrettable and stupid prank. The court case was quashed due to insufficient evidence. Mirella has written of their adventure-strewn marriage with some honesty: defining it as not always the most stable or monogamous of partnerships. However, they shared an intense curiosity about life, seeing the world and Lorenzo while working alongside his wife also played a pivotal role in supporting her as an independent photographer.

In 1971 London she published, her first volume of photographs, entitled Vanishing Africa. According to her, her intention was "to photograph the tribal life and customs of the people of Africa before they changed forever". It was a commercial success. By 2014, there had been four further photo-volumes. The couple by this time reportedly divided their lives between homes in London and in Italy.

== Works ==
- Vanishing Africa, Collins, London 1971; revised edition 1974, ISBN 0-00-211876-9.
- African Saga, Collins, London 1981, ISBN 0-00-216191-5.
- with Lorenzo Ricciardi: African Rainbow: Across Africa by Boat, Ebury Press, London 1989, ISBN 0-85223-746-4.
- Vanishing Amazon, Weidenfeld & Nicolson, London 1991, ISBN 0-2978-3089-9.
- African Visions The Diary of an African Photographer, Cassell & Co, London 2000, ISBN 0-304354015.
