= Loyalty of Love =

1934 film

- Directed by: Guido Brignone
- Written by: Rino Alessi (play); Tomaso Smith
- Produced by: Angelo Besozzi
- Starring: Marta Abba; Nerio Bernardi; Luigi Cimara
- Cinematography: Anchise Brizzi
- Edited by: Giorgio Simonelli
- Music by: Cesare A. Bixio
- Production company: Società Italiana Cines
- Distributed by: Società Italiana Cines
- Release date: August 1934
- Running time: 90 minutes
- Country: Italy
- Language: Italian

Loyalty of Love (Italian: Teresa Confalonieri) is a 1934 Italian historical drama film directed by Guido Brignone and starring Marta Abba, Nerio Bernardi and Luigi Cimara. It is based on the story of Teresa Confalonieri, a celebrated figure of the Italian reunification campaign. It was one of several films made during the 1930s that portrayed this era. It premiered at the Venice Film Festival in August 1934.

The film was shot at the Cines Studios in Rome with sets designed by the art director Guido Fiorini.

== Cast ==
- Marta Abba as Teresa Confalonieri
- Nerio Bernardi as Il conte Federico Confalonieri
- Luigi Cimara as Il principe de Metternich
- Elsa De Giorgi as La principessa Carolina Jablonowska
- Filippo Scelzo as Il barone Salvotti
- Luigi Carini as Il conte Vitaliano Confalonieri
- Riccardo Tassani as Franz the First
- Tina Lattanzi as L'imperatrice Carolina
- Achille Majeroni as Il feldmaresciallo Bubna
- Giovanni Barrella as Bolchesi – il servitore
- Carlo Tamberlani as Luigi Parravicini
- Romolo Costa as Il governatore di Milano
- Luigi Erminio D'Olivo as Cavaliere di Castillo
- Eugenio Duse as Il ministro di polizia
- Mercedes Brignone as La marchesa al ballo
- Lilla Brignone as La marchesina al ballo
- Elli Parvo as La nobildonna al ballo
- Vinicio Sofia as Un uomo di fiducia del barone Salvati
- Mauro Serra as Conte Ilario
- Renato Ferrari as Giudice Menghin
- Maria Zanoli as La cameriera pettegola di casa Confalonieri
- Cesare Polacco as Il banditore al patibolo
- Idolo Tancredi as Operaio della stamperia

== Bibliography ==
- Norma Bouchard. Risorgimento in Modern Italian Culture: Revisiting the Nineteenth-century Past in History, Narrative, and Cinema. Fairleigh Dickinson Univ Press, 2005.
