= These Children =

Questi ragazzi
- Directed by: Mario Mattoli
- Written by: Aldo De Benedetti (writer), Gherardo Gherardi (play)
- Starring: Vittorio De Sica; Paola Barbara; Giuditta Rissone
- Cinematography: Arturo Gallea
- Music by: Giovanni Fusco; Umberto Mancini
- Production companies: Lupa Film; Romulus Film
- Distributed by: Minerva Film
- Release date: 1937
- Running time: 68 minute
- Country: Italy
- Language: Italian

Questi ragazzi or These Children is a 1937 Italian "white-telephones" comedy film directed by Mario Mattoli. The film was produced at Pisorno Studios in Tirrenia.

== Plot ==
Vincenzo and Giovanna have been destined to marry since childhood by their strict aunt Lucia. After the wedding, the two realize that they have never loved each other and go to Lucia for help in having the marriage annulled. There, they discover that Lucia is sincerely in love with the local doctor. Meanwhile, the arrival of a new suitor makes Vincenzo jealous. In the end, Vincenzo and Giovanna abandon the idea of having their marriage annulled.

== Cast ==
- Vittorio De Sica as Vincenzo
- Paola Barbara as Giovanna
- Enrico Viarisio as Giangiacomo Pastori
- Giuditta Rissone as Aunt Lucia
- Checco Rissone as Rissone Francesco
- Armando Migliari as Dr. Andrea
- Adele Garavaglia as Ninetta
- Annette Ciarli
- Yvonne Sandner
- Renzo Brunori
- Massimo Morosini
- Anna Maria Pauli
- Maria Polese
- Anna Valpreda

== Reception ==
Variety gave the film a negative review, stating that it "lost the subtlety of the play, without adding anything new."
