= Checco Rissone =

Italian actor (1909–1985)

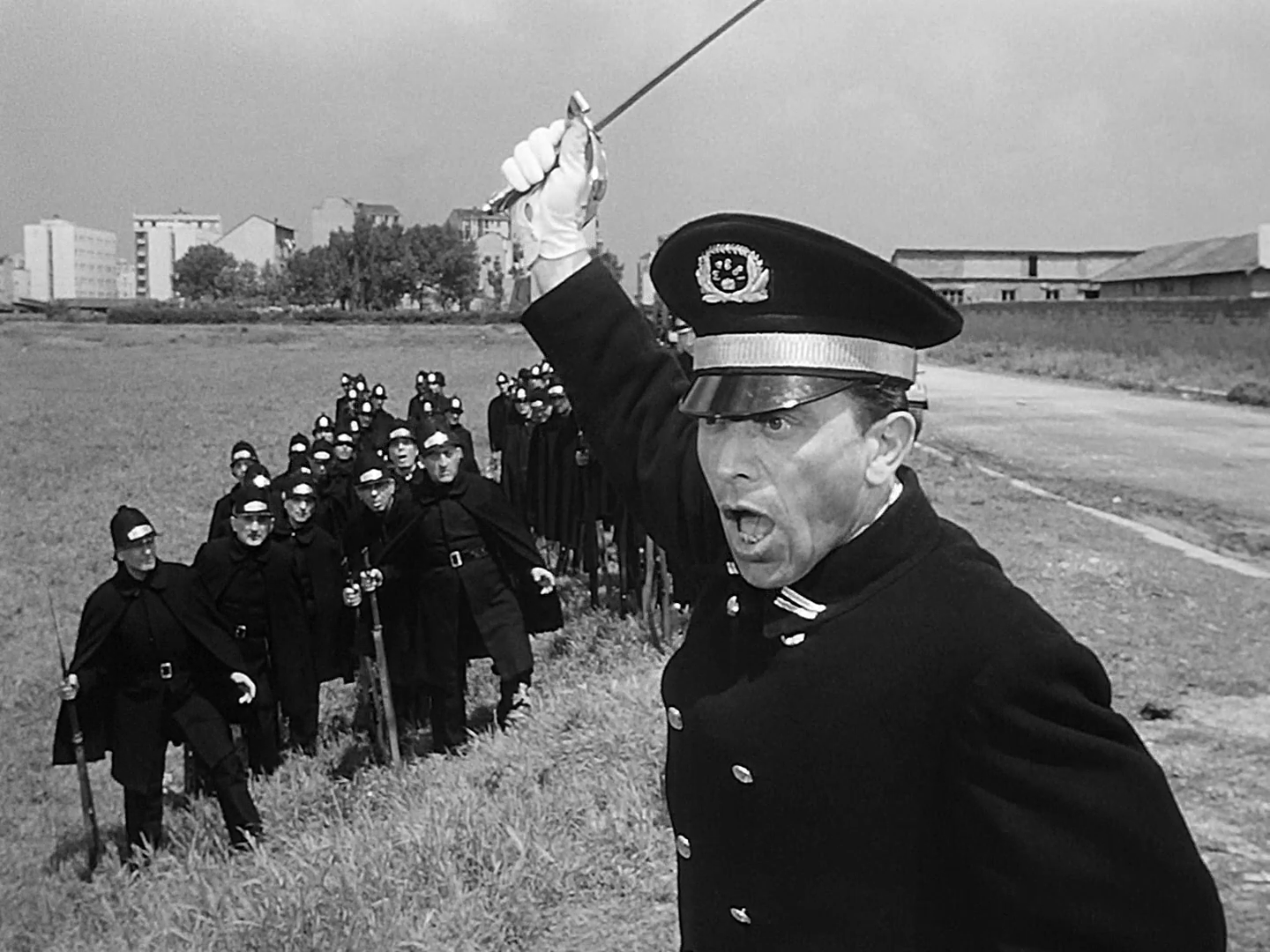
- Checco Rissone in Miracolo a Milano
- Born: Francesco Rissone; 7 July 1909; Turin, Piedmont, Italy
- Died: 26 September 1985 (aged 76); Vicenza, Veneto, Italy
- Relatives: Giuditta Rissone (sister)

Francesco "Checco" Rissone (7 July 1909 – 26 September 1985) was an Italian film, stage and television actor.

== Life and career ==
Rissone was born in Turin, the younger brother of the more famous Giuditta. He debuted on stage at a young age and often worked in the same companies as his sister. Graduating in economics, in the post-war years Rissone specialized in character roles, in films, television and particularly on stage, often working at the Piccolo Teatro in Milan under the direction of Giorgio Strehler. At the Piccolo Teatro, he also worked as assistant director and later as teacher at the drama school of the theatre.

== Partial filmography ==
- Everybody's Secretary (1933)
- Full Speed (1934) – Un ciclista (uncredited)
- Il signore desidera? (1934)
- These Children (1937)
- The Cuckoo Clock (1938) – Narciso
- Departure (1938) – Il fattore
- The Lady in White (1938) – L'autista del pullman a Cervinia
- Duetto vagabondo (1939)
- Ai vostri ordini, signora.. (1939)
- Scandalo per bene (1940)
- Centomila dollari (1940) – L'infermiere ambulanza
- The Two Mothers (1940)
- La granduchessa si diverte (1940)
- The Siege of the Alcazar (1940) – Il radiotelegrafista
- The Sinner (1940) – Tonio (uncredited)
- L'arcidiavolo (1940)
- Inspector Vargas (1940) – Roulis
- Ragazza che dorme (1941) – Lo scemo
- The Betrothed (1941) – Gervaso (uncredited)
- Alone at Last (1942) – Paolo
- Odessa in Flames (1942) – Gruscenko
- A Living Statue (1943)
- Gente dell'aria (1943) – Il tenente Zaccheo
- The Peddler and the Lady (1943) – Giovanni (uncredited)
- I'll Always Love You (1943) – Un giovane mantenuto (uncredited)
- Enrico IV (1943) – Fino Pagliuca / Bertoldo
- La carica degli eroi (1943)
- The Priest's Hat (1944) – Filippino
- No Turning Back (1945) – Ignazio
- Incontro con Laura (1945)
- The Sun Still Rises (1946) – Mario
- Vanity (1947)
- Tragic Hunt (1947) – Mimì
- The Street Has Many Dreams (1948) – Donato
- Bicycle Thieves (1948) – Guard in Piazza Vittorio (uncredited)
- Bitter Rice (1949) – Aristide
- The Walls of Malapaga (1949) – Le faux-monnayeur / il contraffattore
- Patto col diavolo (1950)
- Il sentiero dell'odio (1950)
- Miracle in Milan (1951) – Il comandante in secondo
- Mamma Mia, What an Impression! (1951) – L'uomo del panino
- Bread, Love and Dreams (1953) – Barbiere
- Bread, Love and Jealousy (1954) – Barbiere
- Eva (1962) – Pieri
- Seasons of Our Love (1966) – Olindo Civinini
- Death Occurred Last Night (1970) – Ing. Salvarsanti
- Come Have Coffee with Us (1970) – Mansueto
- Il generale dorme in piedi (1972) – Gen. Ciccolo
