= Giuditta Rissone =

Italian actress (1895–1977)

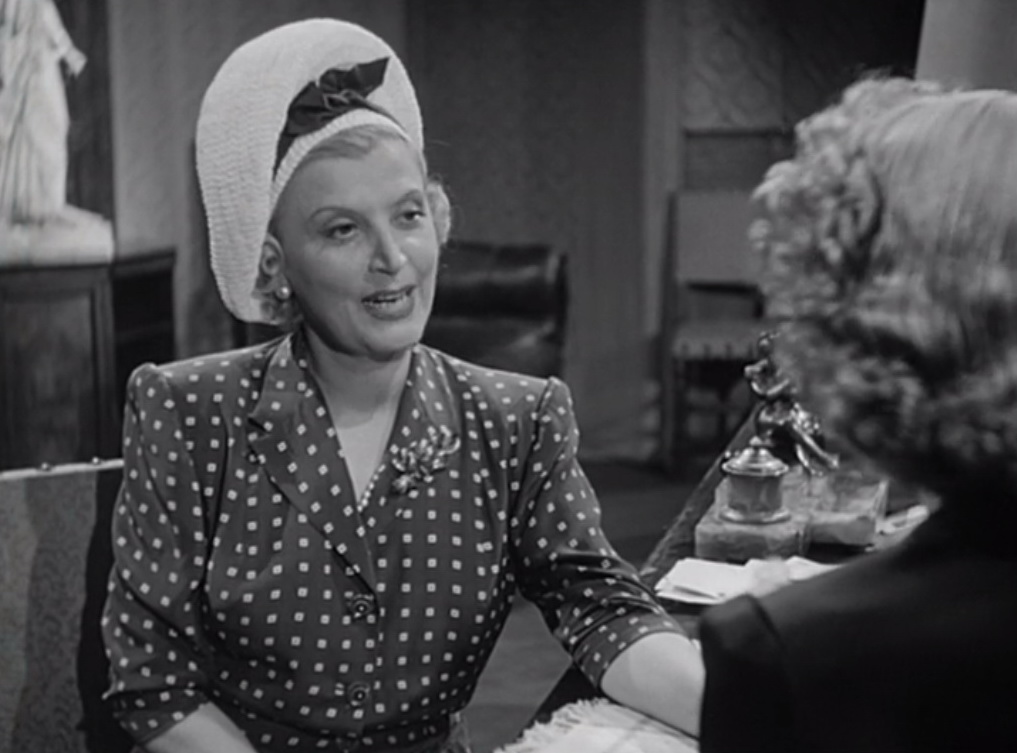
- Rissione in Lively Teresa (1943)
- Born: 28 August 1895; Genoa, Liguria, Kingdom of Italy
- Died: 31 May 1977 (aged 82); Rome, Lazio, Italy
- Occupation: Actress
- Years active: 1933–1966
- Spouse: Vittorio De Sica (m. 1937; div. 1954)
- Children: 1
- Relatives: Checco Rissone (brother)

Giuditta Rissone (28 August 1895 – 31 May 1977) was an Italian film actress who appeared in 25 films between 1933 and 1966. She was born in Genoa and died in Rome. In 1937 in Asti, in the Montferrat region of Piemont she became the wife of actor-director Vittorio De Sica. Her brother Checco Rissone was also an actor.

== Selected filmography ==
- Everybody's Secretary (1933)
- The Missing Treaty (1933) – Miss Alice Baskerville
- Bad Subject (1933) – Susanna, Willy's sister
- Giallo (1934) – (uncredited)
- I Love You Only (1936) – Carlotta
- Lohengrin (1936) – Marianna
- These Children (1937) – Aunt Lucia
- Triumph of Love (1938) – Aunt Lucia
- At Your Orders, Madame (1939) – Evelina Watron
- La fanciulla di Portici (1940) – Marchioness Del Vasto
- Schoolgirl Diary (1941) – boarding school director
- The Adventuress from the Floor Above (1941) – Clara Marchini
- Teresa Venerdì (1941) – governess Anna
- Invisible Chains (1942) – Mrs. Matilde Silvagni
- Love Story (1942)
- Nothing New Tonight (1942) – Clelia, the landlady
- Four Steps in the Clouds (1942) – Clara Bianchi
- Two Suffer Better Than One (1943) – Mrs. Barduzzi
- Lively Teresa (1943) – Matilde Mari, Alberto's mother
- No Turning Back (1945) – Dora Belluzzi
- Eugenie Grandet (1946) – Eugenia's mother
- Toto Tours Italy (1948) – Mrs. Casamandrei
- Torment (1950) – Mother Celeste
- 8½ (1963) – Guido's mother
- La ragazza in prestito (1964) – Mario's mother (final film role)
