= Manlio Busoni =

Italian actor (1906–1999)

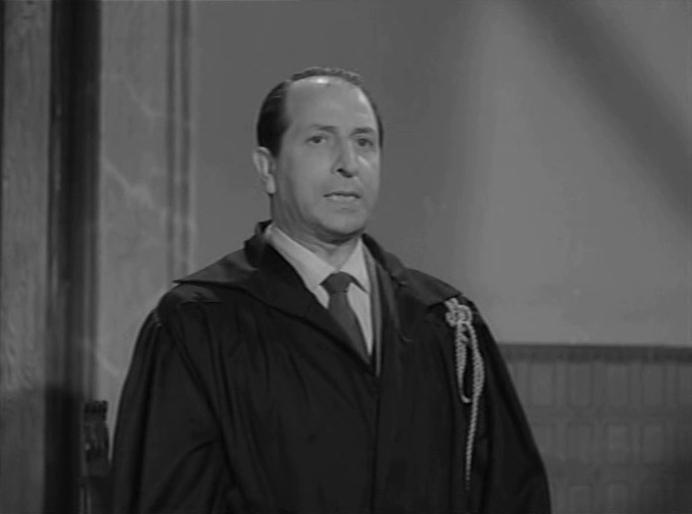
- Busoni in Adorabili e bugiarde (1958)
- Born: 1 October 1906; San Cesareo, Lazio, Kingdom of Italy
- Died: 10 June 1999 (aged 92); Milan, Lombardy, Italy
- Occupation: Actor
- Years active: 1946–1980 (film & TV)

Manlio Busoni (1 October 1906 – 10 June 1999) was an Italian film and television actor. He was also a voice actor, dubbing the performances of other actors.

== Selected filmography ==
- Rome, Free City (1946)
- The White Primrose (1947)
- The Street Has Many Dreams (1948)
- Against the Law (1950)
- In Olden Days (1952)
- I, Hamlet (1952)
- Too Bad She's Bad (1955)
- Adorabili e bugiarde (1958)
- Le inchieste del commissario Maigret (1964, TV series)
- The Battle of El Alamein (1969)
- The Assassination of Matteotti (1973)

== Bibliography ==
- Chiti, Roberto & Poppi, Roberto. Dizionario del cinema italiano: Dal 1945 al 1959. Gremese Editore, 1991.
