= Lilla Brignone =

Italian actress (1913–1984)

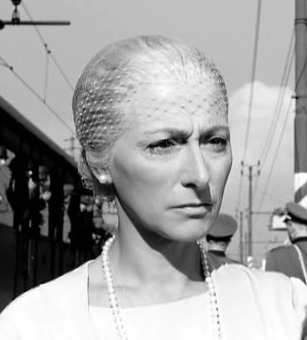
- Brignone in the movie Violent Summer (1961)
- Born: Adelaide Brignone; 23 August 1913; Rome, Italy
- Died: 24 March 1984 (aged 70); Rome, Italy
- Occupation: Actress
- Years active: 1930–1982
- Relatives: Guido Brignone (father); Mercedes Brignone (aunt)

Lilla Brignone (23 August 1913 – 24 March 1984) was an Italian film and theater actress. She appeared in 40 films between 1930 and 1982. Her father was film director and actor Guido Brignone and her aunt was actress Mercedes Brignone. Her mother was actress Lola Visconti (pseudonym of Dolores Visconti).

== Selected filmography ==
- Loyalty of Love (1934)
- Thirty Seconds of Love (1936)
- The Amnesiac (1936)
- The Jester's Supper (1942)
- Abbiamo vinto! (1951)
- Angels of Darkness (1954)
- Dreams in a Drawer (1957)
- Violent Summer (1959)
- Ghosts of Rome (1961)
- L'Eclisse (1962)
- The Betrothed (1964)
- Malicious (1973)
