= Guido Brignone =

Italian film director and actor (1886–1959)

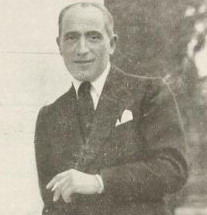
- Guido Brignone in 1930
- Born: 6 December 1886; Milan, Lombardy, Kingdom of Italy
- Died: 6 March 1959 (aged 72); Rome, Lazio, Italy
- Occupation: Film director
- Years active: 1916–1959
- Spouse: Lola Visconti (died 1924)
- Partner(s): Tina Lattanzi (1930s–?)
- Children: Lilla Brignone
- Relatives: Mercedes Brignone (sister)

Guido Brignone (6 December 1886 – 6 March 1959) was an Italian film director and actor. He was the father of actress Lilla Brignone and younger brother of actress Mercedes Brignone.

Brignone was born in Milan. He was the first Italian director to win at the Venice Film Festival, the oldest film festival in the world then at its second edition, with Best Italian Film for Teresa Confalonieri (1934). He died in Rome.

== Selected filmography ==
- Odette (1916)
- The Painting of Osvaldo Mars (1921)
- The Two Sergeants (1922)
- Emperor Maciste (1924)
- Saetta Learns to Live (1924)
- Maciste in Hell (1925)
- Maciste in the Lion's Cage (1926)
- The Giant of the Dolomites (1927)
- Mary's Big Secret (1928)
- Devotion (1929)
- The Man Without Love (1929)
- Before the Jury (1931)
- The Charmer (1931)
- La Wally (1932)
- Pergolesi (1932)
- Paradise (1932)
- Loyalty of Love (1934)
- The Little Schoolmistress (1934)
- Just Married (1934)
- Red Passport (1935)
- Ginevra degli Almieri (1935)
- Beggar's Wedding (1936)
- The Ancestor (1936)
- To Live (1937)
- Marcella (1937)
- For Men Only (1938)
- Under the Southern Cross (1938)
- Kean (1940)
- Disturbance (1942)
- The Gorgon (1942)
- Maria Malibran (1943)
- Baron Carlo Mazza (1948)
- Buried Alive (1949)
- The Ungrateful Heart (1951)
- Deceit (1952)
- Storms (1953)
- Ivan, Son of the White Devil (1953)
- Sunset in Naples (1955)
- The Courier of Moncenisio (1956)
