= Dario Niccodemi =

Italian novelist and playwright (1874–1934)

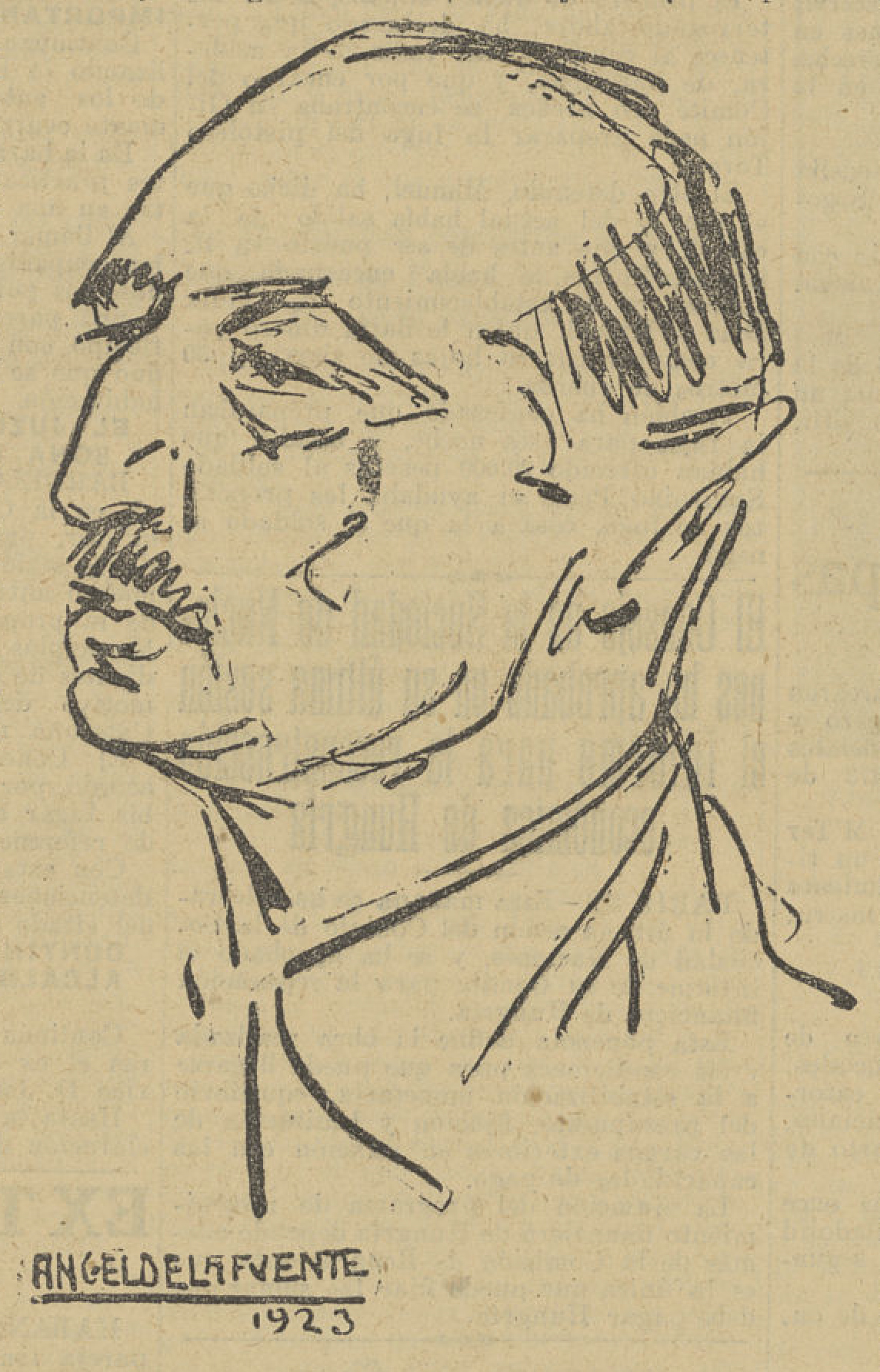
- Born: 1874; Livorno, Italy
- Died: 1934 (aged 59–60); Rome, Italy
- Occupations: novelist and playwright

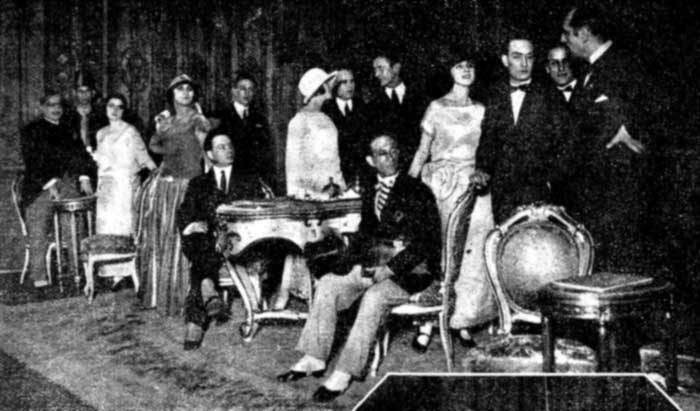
Theater Company Niccodemi, after the play Fuochi d'artificio. Left to right, Marini, Rissone, Vera Vergani, Luigi Chiarelli, Armani, Luigi Almirante, Puccini, Luigi Cimara, Brizzolari and Dario Niccodemi. Actors are still wearing costumes.

Dario Niccodemi (27 January 1874 – 24 September 1934) was an Italian novelist and a playwright who was born in Italy.

== Life and career ==
He spent his youth in Buenos Aires; he met the French actress Rejane in 1900, became her secretary and translated and adapted for her several Italian works. In this way, he learned techniques which he used later on, beginning with L'aigrette (comedy in three acts, 1912).

His comedies represent the bourgeois drama in an ironic and sentimental way, in which his characters are modelled on the society of the beginning of the century.

He founded a theater company in 1921, wrote novels (Il romanzo di scampolo) and two opera librettos, a scampolo with music by Camussi, and another, La ghibellina, with music by Bianchi.

He has written several plays and screenplays, including Scampolo (film, 1928), La nemica, L'alba, il giorno, la notte, La maestrina (film, 1942). About La nemica he said: "The actress Paola Pezzaglia was perhaps the best Nemica on stage". He carried out the first performance of Six Characters in Search of an Author by Luigi Pirandello at Teatro Valle in Rome. Among his fans was Leo Tolstoy, who wrote to prefer La nemica by Niccodemi to Pirandello's dramas of and to Verga's novels.

== Other works ==
- Teatrino, three one-act volumes

first volume includes:

  - Lettera smarrita
  - Il poeta
  - Festa di beneficenza

second volume includes:

  - Fricchi
  - Le tre Grazie
  - L'incognita

third volume includes:

  - Scena vuota
  - La pelliccia
  - Natale.
- Tempo passato, con 17 ritratti
- Il rifugio, three-act play
- I Pescicani, three-act play
- L'ombra, three-act play
- Il Titano, three-act play
- Prete Pero, three-act play
- La volata, three-act play
- L'alba, il giorno, la notte, three-act play
- Acidalia, three-act play
- La casa segreta, three-act play
- La piccina, three-act play
- La Madonna, three-act play

== Bibliography ==
- Dario Niccodemi, Teatrino volume I (Lettera smarrita-Il Poeta-Festa di beneficenza) commedie in un atto, Milano, Fratelli Treves Editori, Quinto migliaio, 1929
- Dizionario Enciclopedico Universale, Casa Editrice Le Lettere, 1981
- Nuova Enciclopedia Universale, Alberto Peruzzo Editore, C.E.I., 1967
