= The Little Teacher (1942 film) =

1942 film

- Directed by: Giorgio Bianchi
- Written by: Giorgio Bianchi; Augusto Mazzetti
- Based on: The Little Teacher by Dario Niccodemi
- Produced by: Attilio Fattori; Vincenzo Genesi
- Starring: Maria Denis; Nino Besozzi; Elvira Betrone
- Cinematography: Mario Craveri
- Edited by: Mario Bonotti
- Music by: Alessandro Cicognini
- Production company: Nembo Film
- Distributed by: Artisti Associati
- Release date: 8 October 1942
- Running time: 83 minutes
- Country: Italy
- Language: Italian

The Little Teacher (Italian: La maestrina) is a 1942 Italian drama film directed by Giorgio Bianchi and starring Maria Denis, Nino Besozzi and Elvira Betrone. It was based on a play of the same title by Dario Niccodemi. It was shot at the Cinecittà Studios in Rome and on location around Lake Orta in Piedmont. The film's sets were designed by the art directors Gino Brosio and Ottavio Scotti.

== Cast ==
- Maria Denis as Maria Bini, la maestrina
- Nino Besozzi as Il sindaco
- Elvira Betrone as La direttrice
- Virgilio Riento as Pallone, il bidello
- Enrico Glori as Giacomo Macchia
- Annibale Betrone as Il medico
- Clara Auteri Pepe as La prima maestra
- Amalia Beretta as La seconda maestra
- Angela Lavagna as La terza maestra
- Luciana Lucarelli as La piccola Annina
- Umberto Sacripante as Il vetturino
- Claudio Ermelli as L'usciere
- Giovanna Ralli as Una bambina

== Bibliography ==
- Goble, Alan. The Complete Index to Literary Sources in Film. Walter de Gruyter, 1999.
- Reich, Jacqueline Beth. Fascism, Film, and Female Subjectivity: The Case of Italian Cinema 1936-1943. University of California, Berkeley, 1994.
