= Mercedes Brignone =

Italian actress (1885–1967)

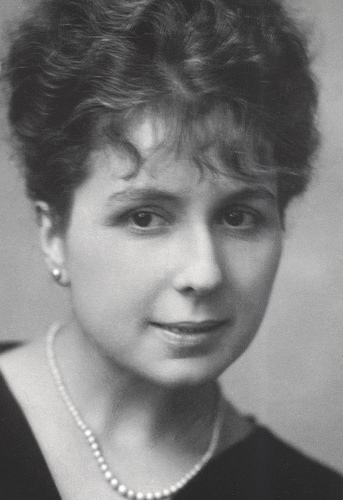
- Born: 18 May 1885; Madrid, Spain
- Died: 24 June 1967 (aged 82); Milan, Italy
- Occupation: Actress
- Years active: 1912–1965 (film)

Mercedes Brignone (18 May 1885 – 24 June 1967) was a Spanish-born Italian stage, film and television actress. She was the daughter of the actor Giuseppe Brignone. She often played divas, and appeared in numerous silent films for Milano Films during the 1910s. In later years she played largely supporting roles. She was the older sister of film director and actor Guido Brignone and the aunt of actress Lilla Brignone.

== Selected filmography ==
- Hamlet (1917)
- The Little Schoolmistress (1919)
- The Painting of Osvaldo Mars (1921)
- The Two Sergeants (1922)
- Maciste's American Nephew (1924)
- The Song of Love (1930)
- Nerone (1930)
- Before the Jury (1931)
- The Charmer (1931)
- Seconda B (1934)
- Loyalty of Love (1934)
- The Wedding March (1934)
- The Ancestor (1936)
- To Live (1937)
- The Document (1939)
- The Marquis of Ruvolito (1939)
- Lorenzaccio (1951)
- Winter Holidays (1959)

== Bibliography ==
- Moliterno, Gino Historical Dictionary of Italian Cinema. Scarecrow Press, 2008.
