= List of Italian films of 1919 =

A list of films produced in Italy in 1919 (see 1919 in film):

Title	Director	Cast	Genre	Notes
1919
...La bocca mi bacio tutto tremante				
L' Accidia				
Adrianna Lecouvreur				
L' Agguato della morte				
A Doll Wife	Carmine Gallone			
The Little Schoolmistress	Eleuterio Rodolfi	Mercedes Brignone, Domenico Serra	Drama	
Redemption	Carmine Gallone	Diana Karenne, Alberto Pasquali, Elisa Severi	Drama	
The Sea of Naples	Carmine Gallone	Alberto Capozzi		
