= List of Italian films of 1918 =

A list of films produced in Italy in 1918 (see 1918 in film):

Title	Director	Cast	Genre	Notes
1918
...E dopo?				
A peso d'oro				
Ah, quella Dory!...				
Fabiola	Enrico Guazzoni	Augusto Mastripietri, Amleto Novelli	Historical	
Goodbye Youth	Augusto Genina	Maria Jacobini, Helena Makowska	Drama	
La storia di un peccato	Carmine Gallone	Soava Gallone		
