= Maria Cebotari =

Romanian singer (1910–1949)

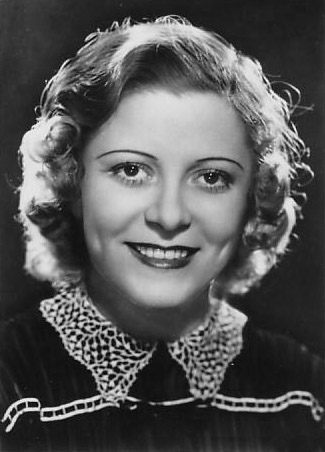
- Born: 10 February 1910; Chișinău, Bessarabia Governorate, Russian Empire (now Moldova)
- Died: 9 June 1949 (aged 39); Vienna, Austria
- Occupation: Opera singer (lyric coloratura soprano)
- Years active: 1931–1949
- Spouse(s): Alexander Virubov (1929–1938); Gustav Diessl (1938–1948)

Maria Cebotari (original name: Ciubotaru, 10 February 1910 – 9 June 1949) was a Bessarabian-born lyric coloratura soprano who made her career in Germany. She was widely known as a soprano by the mid 1930s, in particular for her wide range of repertoire.

Beniamino Gigli stated that Cebotari was one of the greatest female voices he had ever heard. Maria Callas was compared to her, and Angela Gheorghiu named Maria Cebotari among the artists she admires the most.

With thousands of people in attendance, her funeral was "one of the most imposing demonstrations of love and honor any deceased artist has ever received" in the history of Vienna.

== Biography ==
Cebotari was born in Chişinău, Bessarabia, and studied singing at the Chişinău Conservatory in 1910. In 1929, she joined the Moscow Art Theater Company as an actress. Shortly after, she married the company's leader, Alexander Virubov.

She soon moved to Berlin with the company and studied singing with Oskar Daniel for three months. She made her debut as an operatic singer as Mimi in La Bohème at Dresden Semperoper on 15 March 1931. Bruno Walter invited her to the Salzburg Festival, where she sang Euridice in Gluck's opera Orfeo ed Euridice.

In 1935, she sang the part of Aminta in the world premiere of Richard Strauss' opera Die Schweigsame Frau under Karl Böhm at Dresden Semper Opera House. Strauss advised her to move to Berlin, and in 1936 she joined the Berlin State Opera, where she was a prima donna until 1946. That year, she sang Susanna in Le Nozze di Figaro, Zerlina in Don Giovanni, and Sophie in Der Rosenkavalier for the Dresden Semper Opera Company's performances at Covent Garden Royal Opera House of London. Cebotari appeared at many opera houses, including the Vienna State Opera and La Scala Opera House of Milan.

In 1938, she divorced Virubov and married the Austrian actor Gustav Diessl, with whom she had two sons. In 1946, she left Berlin and joined the Vienna State Opera House. The next year, she revisited Covent Garden with the Vienna State Opera Company and sang Salome, Donna Anna in Don Giovanni, and Countess Almaviva in Le Nozze di Figaro. On September 27 of that year, she was Donna Anna to the Ottavio of Richard Tauber, in his final stage appearance less than a week before his cancerous left lung was removed.

In early 1949, she suffered severe pain during the performance of Le Nozze di Figaro at La Scala Opera House. At first, doctors did not consider it serious. However, on 31 March 1949, she collapsed during the performance of Karl Millöcker's operetta Der Bettelstudent in Vienna. During surgery on 4 April, doctors found cancer in her liver and pancreas. She died from cancer on 9 June 1949 in Vienna. British pianist Clifford Curzon and his wife Lucille Wallace adopted her two sons.

Cebotari had a versatile voice; her repertoire covered coloratura, soubrette, lyric, and dramatic roles, as is illustrated in her performance history. She concentrated on four composers: Mozart, Richard Strauss, Verdi, and Puccini. During a BBC interview decades after her death, Herbert von Karajan said she was the greatest "Madame Butterfly" he had ever conducted.

== Films ==
Along with her successful career at the opera houses, Cebotari appeared in several operatic films, such as Verdi's Three Women, Maria Malibran, and The Dream of Madame Butterfly.

Cebotari also was cast in the film Odessa in fiamme (Odessa in Flames) in 1942, directed by Italian director Carmine Gallone with the script by Nicolae Kiriţescu. The movie is a fascist propaganda film about the Battle of Odessa, which was won by Romanian and Nazi troops. The Romanian-Italian co-production won at the Festival of Venice in 1942. In the film, Cebotari plays the role of Maria Teodorescu, an opera singer from Bessarabia, in Chisinau with her eight-year-old son at the time of the invasion. Her husband fights as a captain in the Romanian army in Bucharest, and her son is taken. Teodorescu is informed that her son will be kept in a camp and trained to be a Soviet man. Teodorescu consents to perform Russian music in theatres and taverns in exchange for her son's return. By chance, her spouse discovers her photo, and the family gets back together.

Odessa in Flames was banned after Soviet troops reached Bucharest. The film was later rediscovered in the Cinecittà archives in Rome, where it was screened for the first time in years in Romania in December 2006.

Director Vlad Druc's documentary "Aria" (2005) about the life of Maria Cebotari faced difficulties when screening in Moldova during the Communist administration (which ended in 2009). This was due to a part in the movie where the soprano self-identifies as Romanian, contrary to the official policy of the Communist government that called the ethnic majority Moldovan.

== Recordings ==
Many of her surviving recordings are from live performances, either in opera houses or radio broadcasts. Almost all have now been digitally remastered.

The Austrian CD label Preiser Records has issued several of her CDs, among which is The Art of Maria Cebotari and Maria Cebotari singt Richard Strauss.

- Mozart – Le nozze di Figaro (Böhm 1938, in German/Ahlersmeyer, Teschemacher, Schöffler, Wessely, Böhme) Preiser
- Puccini – Turandot (Keilberth 1938, in German/Hauss, Buchta, Hann, Eipperle, Harlan, Schupp, Kiefer), Koch-Schwann
- Schoeck – Das Schloss Dürande (Heger live 1943, excerpts/Anders, Berglund, Fuchs, Domgraf-Fassbaender, Greindl, Hüsch), Jecklin
- R. Strauss – Salome (Krauss 1947 live/Rothmüller, Höngen), Gebhardt
- R. Strauss – Taillefer (Rother 1944/ Walter Ludwig, Hans Hotter), Preiser
- Verdi – Luisa Miller (Elmendorff 1944, in German/Böhme, Hopf, Hann, Herrmann, Eipperle), Preiser
- Verdi – La traviata (Steinkopf 1943, in German/Rosvaenge, Schlusnus), Iron Needle
- von Einem – Dantons Tod (Fricsay live 1947/Schöffler, Patzak, Klein, Weber, Alsen, Hann), Stradivarius
- Recital (Mozart, Verdi, Puccini, Leoncavallo, J. Strauss, Arditi, Rachmaninov, Beckmann, Mackeben, Tchaikovsky), Preiser – LV
- Recital – Maria Cebotari singt Arien (Mozart, J. Strauss, Gounod, Puccini and R. Strauss), Preiser – LV
- Maria Cebotari – Arien, Duette, Szenen (Mozart, Bizet, Verdi, Puccini), Preiser
- Recital – Maria Cebotari singt Richard Strauss (Salome, Feuersnot, Der Rosenkavalier, Daphne, Taillefer), Preiser (Berliner Rundfunk Sinfonie Orchester, Artur Rother, 1–4 recorded 1943, 5 in 1944).
- Maria Cebotari: Arias, Songs and in Film, Weltbild
- Recital – Maria Cebotari singt Giuseppe Verdi (La traviata, Rigoletto), Preiser
- Four Famous Sopranos of the Past (Gitta Alpar, Jarmila Novotná and Esther Réthy), Preiser – LV
- Bruno Walter Vol. 1, Symphony No 2 and No 4 (1948/50), LYS
- Helge Rosvaenge in Szenen aus André Chénier und Rigoletto – Duets, Preiser
- Helge Rosvaenge – Duets, Preiser – LV
- Grosse Mozartsänger Vol. 1 1922 – 1942, Orfeo
- Von der Königlichen Hofoper zur Staatsoper ‘Unter den Linden’, Preiser – LV

== Filmography ==
- Troika (1930)
- Girls in White (1936)
- Mother Song (1937)
- Strong Hearts (1937)
- Giuseppe Verdi (1938)
- The Dream of Butterfly (1939)
- Love Me, Alfredo! (1940)
- Odessa in Flames (1942)
- Maria Malibran (1943)

== Sources ==
- Pâris, Alain (14 October 2004). Le dictionnaire des interprètes. Robert Laffont. ISBN 978-2-221-10214-5.
