= Scipio Africanus: The Defeat of Hannibal =

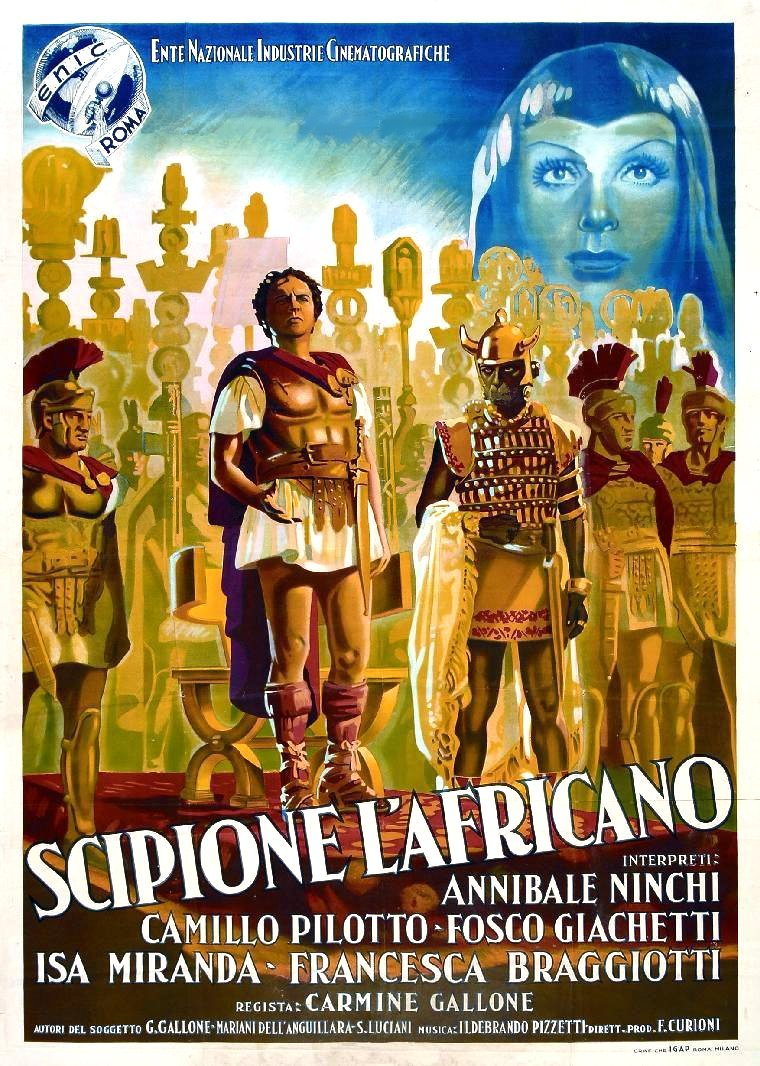
- Directed by: Carmine Gallone
- Written by: Camillo Mariani dell'Aguillara; S.A. Luciani; Carmine Gallone; Silvio Maurano
- Produced by: Federic Curiosi
- Starring: Annibale Ninchi; Camillo Pilotto; Isa Miranda
- Production company: ENIC
- Release date: 1937
- Running time: 83 minutes
- Country: Italy
- Language: Italian
- Budget: 12.6 million lira

Scipio Africanus: The Defeat of Hannibal (Italian title: Scipione l'africano) is a 1937 Italian historical propaganda film directed by Carmine Gallone about Scipio Africanus from the time of his election as proconsul until his defeat of Hannibal at the Battle of Zama. The film received financial backing from Benito Mussolini's dictatorship and its production was overseen by Vittorio Mussolini.

== Plot ==
Publius Cornelius Scipio is selected to serve as consul following the Battle of Cannae. Scipio defeats Hasdrubal in Spain before defeating Hannibal at the Battle of Zama. Queen Sophonisba is captured and commits suicide by drinking poison.

== Cast ==
- Annibale Ninchi as Scipio Africanus
- Camillo Pilotto as Hannibal
- Fosco Giachetti as Captain Masinissa
- Francesca Braggiotti as Sophonisba
- Marcello Giorda as Syphax
- Guglielmo Barnabò as Furius
- Isa Miranda as Velia
- Memo Benassi as Cato the Elder
- Franco Coop as Mezio
- Ciro Galvani as Quintus Fabius Maximus Verrucosus
- Carlo Lombardi as Lucius
- Marcello Spada as Arunte
- Piero Carnabuci as Il Reduce della Battaglia
- Carlo Ninchi as Lelius
- Lamberto Picasso as Hasdrubal

== Production ==
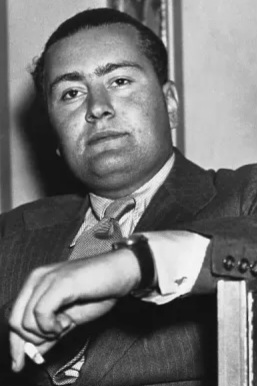
Vittorio Mussolini, the son of Benito Mussolini, oversaw the film's production.

Benito Mussolini sought to revive Italian cinema after it was hurt by multiple box-office failures in the 1920s. His son Vittorio Mussolini oversaw the production of the film. He refused to use miniatures and sets up to 175 feet were built by 500 workers.

The film was shot over the course of 232 days from 10 August 1936 to 29 March 1937, near Sabaudia with 12.6 million lira invested by the Italian government. 20 principal actors, 38 secondary actors, 44,425 extras, 26,671 crew members, 174,610 military personnel, 3,171 horses, and 50 elephants were used for the film. 500 camels for a three minute scene and 100 seaworthy galleys were used. The film cost around twenty times more than the average Italian film of the time.

The scene depicting the Battle of Zama used 12,000 soldiers and 1,000 Libyan horsemen. Sixteen soldiers were injured during the filming of the battle. The soldiers were then transferred to duty in the Spanish Civil War. Tobis Film participated in the film's production and required that Hannibal's soldiers be Aryans.

On 10 June 1936, Giacomo Paulucci, president of ENIC, asked Ildebrando Pizzetti to compose the film's score. It was the first film that Pizzetti worked on although he was offered the role to compose Cabiria. The score was completed by spring 1937, and Pizzetti performed one of its songs before Benito Mussolini on 28 April in Cinecittà using the orchestra and chorus of the Teatro dell'Opera di Roma. Mussolini considered adopting Pizzetti's Inno a Roma as the national anthem of Italy according to Luigi Freddi.

Carmine Gallone was selected to direct the film, but Italian officials criticized his failure to prevent historical inaccuracies in the film, including extras wearing watches and telephone wires in the background of the Battle of Zama. Gallone argued against cutting the scenes featuring the inaccuracies due to them being needed for continuity and the scenes remained in the film. Gallone, Camillo Mariani dell'Aguillara, S.A. Luciani, and Silvio Maurano wrote the film. The film's cinematography was done by Ubaldo Arata and Anchise Brizzi.

Freddi stated that the "political aim of Scipione l'africano is not banal propaganda, it is the expression of the transcendent continuity in our history which transmits into the Black Shirt legionary the living and vibrant echo of the legionary at Zama".

== Release ==
Benito Mussolini was shown the film on 4 August 1937. The film was shown at the Venice Film Festival on 25 August, where it received the Coppa Mussolini for Best Italian Film. The film was distributed by Esperia Film Distribution in the United States.

== Reception ==
The June-July issue of Bianco e Nero was solely devoted to coverage of the film. Variety stated that the film was "undramatic and wooden". Bosley Crowther, writing in The New York Times, stated that "there are moments in the film when one feels that it is not so much the noble days of Republican Rome that one is witnessing as the last act of Aida".

Time's review of the film stated that it "is also as spectacular a show as the movies have seen since the Italian Quo Vadis first made the U.S. spectacle-conscious".

== See also ==
- list of historical drama films
- List of films set in ancient Rome

== Works cited ==
- Caprotti, Federico (2009). "Scipio Africanus: film, internal colonization and empire". Cultural Geographies. 16 (3). SAGE Publishing: 381–401. doi:10.1177/1474474009105054. JSTOR 44251536. S2CID 144393385.
- Cornell, Tim; Lomas, Kathryn, eds. (1995). Urban Society in Roman Italy. St. Martin's Press. ISBN 0312124163.
- Medved, Harry; Medved, Michael (1984). The Hollywood Hall of Shame: The Most Expensive Flops in Movie History. Angus & Robertson. ISBN 0207149291.
- Sciannameo, Franco (2004). "In Black and White: Pizzetti, Mussolini and "Scipio Africanus"". The Musical Times. 145 (1887): 25–50. doi:10.2307/4149145. JSTOR 4149145.
- Vermilye, Jerry (1994). Great Italian Films. Carol Publishing Group. ISBN 0806514809.
- "Scipio Africanus". Time. 27 November 1939.
