= 3rd Venice International Film Festival =

Italian film festival in 1935

- Festival poster
- Location: Venice, Italy
- Founded: 1932
- Festival date: 10 August – 1 September 1935
- Website: labiennale.org

Venice Film Festival chronology
- 4th 2nd

The 3rd annual Venice International Film Festival was held between 10 August and 1 September 1935. This festival saw the introduction of the Coppa Volpi for the acting awards.

== Jury ==
- Giuseppe Volpi di Misurata, Italian - Jury President
- Raffaele Calzini, Italian
- Ottavio Croze, Italian
- Giacomo Paolucci de'Calboli, Italian
- Gino Damerini, Italian
- Charles Delac, French
- Giovanni Dettori, Italian
- Luigi Freddi, Italian
- Eugenio Giovannetti, Italian
- Mario Gromo, Italian
- Antonio Maraini, Italian
- Ryszard Ordynski, Polish
- Filippo Sacchi, Italian
- Fritz Scheuermann, German
- Louis Villani, Hungarian
- Elio Zorzi, Italian

== In-Competition films ==
- Anna Karenina by Clarence Brown
- Becky Sharp by Rouben Mamoulian
- Casta diva by Carmine Gallone
- Crime et châtiment by Pierre Chenal
- Die ewige Maske by Werner Hochbaum
- Episode by Walter Reisch
- La dame aux camélias by Abel Gance, Fernand Rivers
- Sanders of the River by Zoltán Korda
- The Informer by John Ford
- David Copperfield by George Cukor
- The Wedding Night by King Vidor

== Awards ==
- Best Foreign Film: Anna Karenina by Clarence Brown
- Best Italian Film: Casta diva by Carmine Gallone
- Volpi Cup:
  - Best Actor: Pierre Blanchar for Crime et châtiment
  - Best Actress: Paula Wessely for Episode
- Golden Medal: The Band Concert by Walt Disney
- Special Mention:
  - Hermine und die sieben Aufrechten by Frank Wisbar
  - Le voyage imprévu by Jean de Limur
  - Maria Chapdelaine by Julien Duvivier
  - Op hoop van zegen by Alex Benno
  - The Private Life of the Gannets by Julian Huxley
- Biennale Cup: Dream Love by Heinz Hille
- Best Director: The Wedding Night by King Vidor
- Best Cinematography: The Devil Is a Woman by Josef von Sternberg, Lucien Ballard
- Best Music: Sanders of the River by Mischa Spoliansky
- Best Animation: The Band Concert by Walt Disney
- Jury Special Mention: L'Chayim Hadashim by Judah Leman
