= Ciro Galvani =

Italian actor (1867–1956)

- Born: 10 April 1867; Castel San Pietro Terme, Emilia-Romagna, Italy
- Died: 29 January 1956 (aged 88); Castel San Pietro Terme, Emilia-Romagna, Italy
- Other name: Giuseppe Chiamato Ciro Galvani
- Occupation: Actor
- Years active: 1909-1937 (film)

Ciro Galvani (1867–1956) was an Italian stage and film actor. He appeared in a number of films directed by Carmine Gallone.

== Selected filmography ==
- La storia di un peccato (1918)
- Nemesis (1920)
- The Ship (1921)
- The Fiery Cavalcade (1925)
- The Last Adventure (1932)
- King of Diamonds (1936)
- Scipio Africanus: The Defeat of Hannibal (1937)

== Bibliography ==
- Goble, Alan. The Complete Index to Literary Sources in Film. Walter de Gruyter, 1999.
