= Antonio Meucci (film) =

1940 film

- Directed by: Enrico Guazzoni
- Written by: Guido Cantini; Lucio D'Ambra; Alberto Spaini; Nando Vitali
- Produced by: Angelo Tarchi
- Starring: Luigi Pavese; Leda Gloria; Nerio Bernardi; Greta Gonda
- Cinematography: Fernando Risi
- Edited by: Pietro Benedetti
- Music by: Ezio Carabella
- Production company: Sabaudia Film
- Distributed by: ENIC
- Release date: 30 June 1940
- Running time: 87 minutes
- Country: Italy
- Language: Italian

Antonio Meucci is a 1940 Italian historical drama film directed by Enrico Guazzoni and starring Luigi Pavese, Leda Gloria, and Nerio Bernardi. It portrays the life of Antonio Meucci, the nineteenth century inventor and supporter of Giuseppe Garibaldi. The film was shot at the Cinecittà Studios in Rome. The film's sets were designed by the art director Pietro Monastero.

== Cast ==
- Luigi Pavese as Antonio Meucci
- Leda Gloria as Ester Meucci, sua moglie
- Nerio Bernardi as Alexander Graham Bell
- Greta Gonda as Consuelo Ispahan
- Osvaldo Valenti as Giuseppe Garibaldi giovane
- Armando Migliari as Elisha Gray
- Rubi D'Alma as Liliana Montes
- Anna Valpreda as Mary
- Rudi Dal Pra as Ramiro Gomez
- Olinto Cristina as Wilson
- Emilio Petacci as Sam Cloton
- Nino Pavese as L'onorevole Closter
- Gino Bianchi as Parodi
- Aristide Garbini as Fleming
- Oreste Fares as Il medico
- Nino Marchesini as Il presidente del tribunale
- Eugenio Duse as Il giornalista
- Cesare Fantoni as L'avvocato difensore
- Clara Andri
- Franco Barci
- Ernesto Bianchi
- Gildo Bocci
- Vasco Cataldo
- Tullio Galvani
- Bebi Nucci
- Luciano Seno
- Gina Spicchiesi
- Franca Volpini
- Olga von Kollar

== Bibliography ==
- Poppi, Roberto. I film: Tutti i film italiani dal 1930 al 1944. Gremese Editore.
- Savio, Francesco. Ma l'amore no: realismo, formalismo, propaganda e telefoni bianchi nel cinema italiano di regime (1930-1943). Sonzogno, 1975.
