= 13th man =

13th man or thirteenth man may refer to:

- 13th man (Canadian football), like the 12th man in 11-player forms of football, a reference to fans of a 12-player Canadian football team
- The 13th Man, a 1937 American mystery film
- The Thirteenth Man, a 1917 Italian drama silent film
- 13th man rule, a provision in the American Basketball Association rulebook allowing each 12-man team to dress an extra player
