= Niccolò Lazzari =

Italian film editor

- Occupation: Editor
- Years active: 1940-1966

Niccolò Lazzari was an Italian film editor. He worked on more than thirty films between 1940 and 1966, including Vittorio De Sica's neorealist Shoeshine (1946). He worked on a number of films directed by Carmine Gallone.

== Partial filmography ==
- Eternal Melodies (1940)
- Love Me, Alfredo! (1940)
- First Love (1941)
- The Two Orphans (1942)
- Odessa in Flames (1942)
- Sad Loves (1943)
- Shoeshine (1946)
- Before Him All Rome Trembled (1946)
- The Lady of the Camellias (1947)
- The Legend of Faust (1949)
- Night Taxi (1950)
- The Force of Destiny (1950)
- Messalina (1951)
- We're Dancing on the Rainbow (1952)
- Neapolitan Carousel (1954)
- Madame Butterfly (1954)
- House of Ricordi (1954)
- Tosca (1956)
- Altair (1956)
- Damon and Pythias (1962)

== Bibliography ==
- Bizio, Silvia & Laffranchi, Claudia. Cinema Italian style: Italians at the Academy Awards. Gremese, 2002.
