= Garbini =

Garbini is a surname. Notable people with the surname include:

- Aristide Garbini (1890–1950), Italian film actor
- Michel Garbini Pereira (born 1981), Brazilian football player
