= Gilda Marchiò =

Italian theatre actress

- Born: 9 July 1884; Florence, Tuscany, Kingdom of Italy
- Died: 22 October 1954 (aged 70); Bologna, Emilia-Romagna, Italy
- Occupation: Actress
- Years active: 1941–1945 (film)

Gilda Marchiò (1884–1954) was an Italian theatre actress. She also appeared in a number of films in the 1940s, her performances including a small role in the 1942 propaganda film Odessa in Flames.

== Selected filmography ==
- The Betrothed (1941)
- A Garibaldian in the Convent (1942)
- Odessa in Flames (1942)
- Nothing New Tonight (1942)
- Rossini (1942)
- The Two Orphans (1942)
- I'll Always Love You (1943)
- In High Places (1943)
- Short Circuit (1943)
- No Turning Back (1945)

== Bibliography ==
- Susan Bassnett & Jennifer Lorch. Luigi Pirandello in the Theatre. Routledge, 2014.
