= Tragic Hunt =

1947 Italian drama film

- Directed by: Giuseppe De Santis
- Written by: Giuseppe De Santis; Corrado Alvaro; Michelangelo Antonioni; Umberto Barbaro; Carlo Lizzani; Gianni Puccini; Cesare Zavattini
- Produced by: Giorgio Agliani; Marcello Caccialupi
- Starring: Vivi Gioi; Massimo Girotti; Carla Del Poggio; Andrea Checchi
- Cinematography: Otello Martelli
- Edited by: Mario Serandrei
- Music by: Giuseppe Rosati
- Production companies: Dante Film; ANPI
- Distributed by: Libertas Film
- Release date: 4 November 1947
- Running time: 90 Minutes
- Country: Italy
- Language: Italian

Tragic Hunt (Italian: Caccia tragica) is a 1947 Italian drama film directed by Giuseppe De Santis and starring Vivi Gioi, Andrea Checchi and Carla Del Poggio. It was part of the wave of postwar neorealist films. It was one of two produced by the ANPI movement along with The Sun Still Rises from the previous year.

Future filmmakers Michelangelo Antonioni and Carlo Lizzani co-wrote the script. The film's sets were designed by the art director Carlo Egidi.

== Plot ==
After the Second World War, in Emilia-Romagna, Italy, a cooperative has been founded by peasants. War has destroyed the country. A group of bandits, with former Nazi-collaborator Daniela, known as 'Lili Marlene' (Vivi Gioi), holds up the truck where the money of the cooperative is travelling. All the peasants search for the thieves in a tragic hunt.

== Cast ==
- Vivi Gioi as Daniela 'Lili Marlene'
- Andrea Checchi as Alberto
- Carla Del Poggio as Giovanna
- Massimo Girotti as Michele
- Vittorio Duse as Giuseppe
- Checco Rissone as Mimì
- Umberto Sacripante as The lame man
- Folco Lulli as A farmer
- Michele Riccardini as The maresciallo
- Eugenia Grandi as Sultana
- Piero Lulli as The driver
- Ermanno Randi as Andrea
- Enrico Tacchetti as The accountant
- Carlo Lizzani as The veteran holding a speech

== Awards ==
It won two Nastro d'Argento as Best Director and Best Supporting Actress (Vivi Gioi).
