= Alfredo Martinelli =

Italian actor (1899–1968)

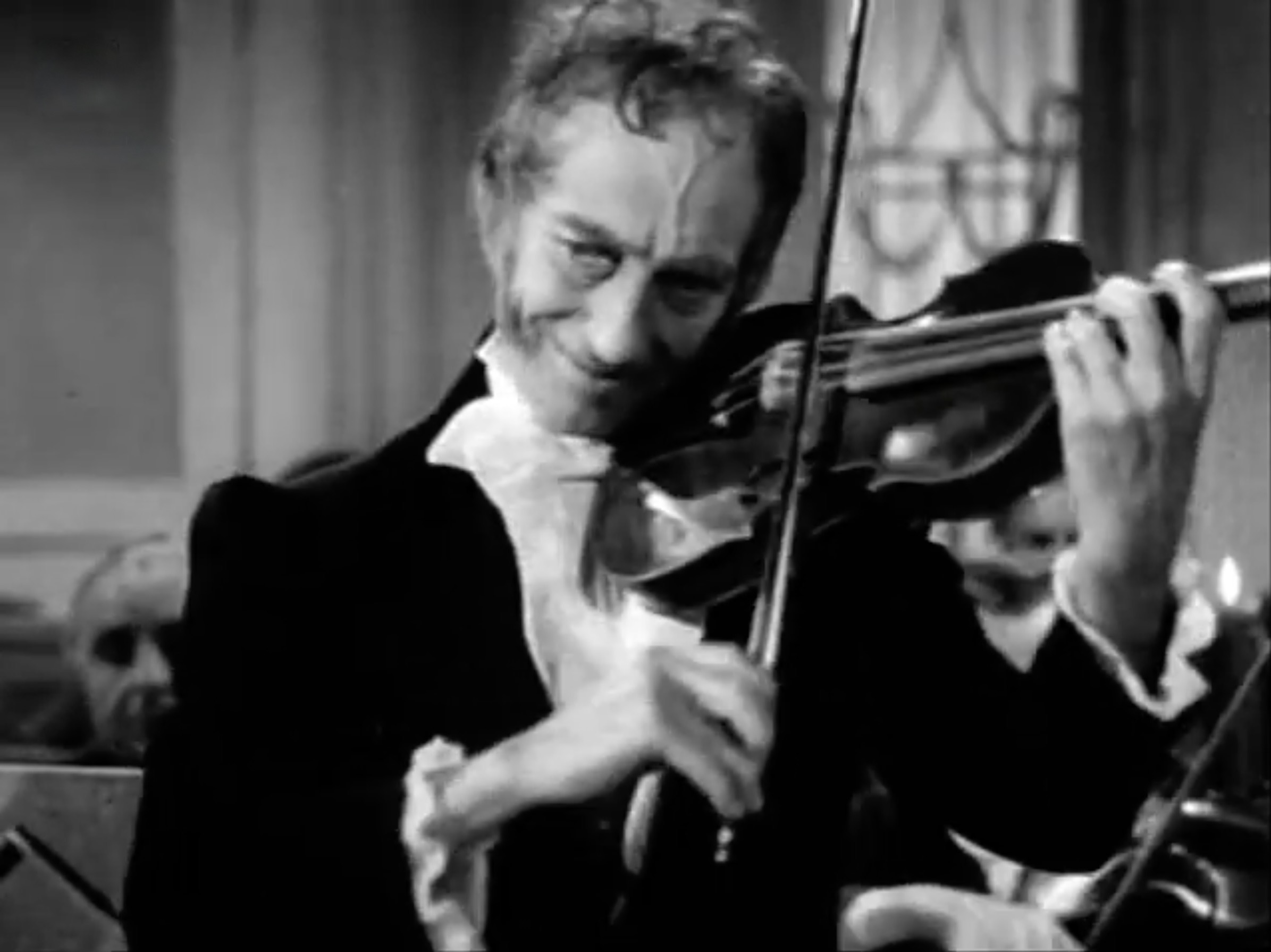
- Martinelli in A Romantic Adventure (1940)
- Born: 7 March 1899; Siena, Tuscany, Italy
- Died: 11 November 1968 (aged 69); Siena, Tuscany, Italy
- Occupation: Actor
- Years active: 1916-1967

Alfredo Martinelli (7 March 1899 – 11 November 1968) was an Italian film actor. He appeared in 103 films between 1916 and 1967. He was born and died in Siena, Tuscany.

== Selected filmography ==
- I Topi Grigi (1918)
- Tortured Soul (1919)
- Il teschio d'oro (1920)
- The Second Wife (1922)
- The White Sister (1923)
- La dama de Chez Maxim's (1923)
- Romola (1924)
- The Faces of Love (1924)
- The Fiery Cavalcade (1925)
- The Last Days of Pompeii (1926)
- Floretta and Patapon (1927)
- The Storyteller of Venice (1929)
- Assunta Spina (1930)
- The Charmer (1931)
- Resurrection (1931)
- Before the Jury (1931)
- Figaro and His Great Day (1931)
- The Devil's Lantern (1931)
- The Private Secretary (1931)
- The Opera Singer (1932)
- Paradise (1932)
- Seconda B (1934)
- Everybody's Woman (1934)
- A Woman Between Two Worlds (1936)
- Adam's Tree (1936)
- Hands Off Me! (1937)
- The Ferocious Saladin (1937)
- It Always Ends That Way (1939)
- Heartbeat (1939)
- The Hotel of the Absent (1939)
- No Man's Land (1939)
- Eternal Melodies (1940)
- Red Tavern (1940)
- A Romantic Adventure (1940)
- Kean (1940)
- Two on a Vacation (1940)
- The Man on the Street (1941)
- The Secret Lover (1941)
- The Hero of Venice (1941)
- A Husband for the Month of April (1941)
- The Countess of Castiglione (1942)
- The Black Panther (1942)
- Fedora (1942)
- Don Cesare di Bazan (1942)
- Two Hearts Among the Beasts (1943)
- The Peddler and the Lady (1943)
- Annabella's Adventure (1943)
- The Adulteress (1946)
