= Before Him All Rome Trembled =

- Directed by: Carmine Gallone
- Written by: Gherardo Gherardi; Gaspare Cataldo; Carmine Gallone
- Starring: Anna Magnani; Tito Gobbi; Hans Hinrich; Gino Sinimberghi
- Cinematography: Anchise Brizzi
- Edited by: Niccolò Lazzari
- Music by: Renzo Rossellini
- Production company: Excelsa Film
- Distributed by: Minerva Film
- Release date: 2 October 1946
- Running time: 98 minutes
- Country: Italy
- Language: Italian

Before Him All Rome Trembled (Italian: Avanti a lui tremava tutta Roma) is a 1946 Italian musical war melodrama film directed by Carmine Gallone and starring Anna Magnani, Tito Gobbi and Hans Hinrich. Ada and Marco are a pair of opera singers, who moonlight working for the Italian resistance at the time of the German occupation of Rome during the Second World War. They are sheltering a British soldier with whom they make contact with the advancing Allied forces. Sylistically the film is a hybrid between filmed performances of opera, and a neorealistic resistance melodrama.

The title refers to Giacomo Puccini's Tosca, which is performed during the film.

== Cast ==
- Anna Magnani as Ada
- Tito Gobbi as Marco
- Hans Hinrich as German Officer
- Gino Sinimberghi as Frank, the British soldier
- Guido Notari as Doctor
- Tino Scotti as Mechanic
- Guglielmo Sinaz as Stagehand
- Joop van Hulzen as Webb
- Giuseppe Varni as Stagehand
- Carlo Duse as Police Officer
- Edda Albertini as Lena
- Heinrich Bode as German Soldier
- Antonio Crast
- Giulio Neri
- Ave Ninchi

== Bibliography ==
- Bayman, Louis & Rigoletto, Sergio. Popular Italian Cinema. Palgrave Macmillan, 2013.
