= Hurricane in the Tropics =

- Directed by: Pier Luigi Faraldo; Gino Talamo
- Written by: Anton Giulio Majano (novel); Antonio Leonviola; Domenico Meccoli
- Produced by: G.G. Ponzano
- Starring: Fosco Giachetti; Rubi D'Alma; Osvaldo Valenti; Mino Doro
- Cinematography: Aldo Tonti
- Edited by: Gino Talamo
- Music by: Ulisse Siciliani
- Production company: Ponzano Film
- Distributed by: Ponzano Film
- Release date: 4 November 1939
- Running time: 74 minutes
- Country: Italy
- Language: Italian

Hurricane in the Tropics (Italian: Uragano ai tropici) is a 1939 Italian adventure film directed by Pier Luigi Faraldo and Gino Talamo and starring Fosco Giachetti, Rubi D'Alma, and Osvaldo Valenti. The film is based on a novel by Anton Giulio Majano. The film was shot at the Fert Studios in Turin, with sets designed by Ottavio Scotti.

== Cast ==
- Fosco Giachetti as Il capitano Moraes
- Rubi D'Alma as Manoela Moraes
- Osvaldo Valenti as Il tenente Reguero (dubbed by Renato Cialente)
- Mino Doro as Nichols
- Vinicio Sofia as Il radiotelegrafista
- Danilo Calamai
- Aristide Garbini
- Antimo Reyner

== Bibliography ==
- Poppi, Roberto Dizionario Del Cinema Italiano. I film: Tutti i film italiani dal 1930 al 1944.
