= Il siluramento dell'Oceania =

- Directed by: Augusto Genina
- Release date: 1917
- Country: Italy
- Language: Silent

Il siluramento dell'Oceania is a 1917 Italian film directed by Augusto Genina.

== Cast ==
- Alfredo Boccolini
- Cecyl Tryan
- Ileana Leonidoff
- Oreste Bilancia
- Vasco Creti
- Pietro Pesci
- Armando Pilotti
