= Love Me, Alfredo! =

1940 film directed by Carmine Gallone

- Directed by: Carmine Gallone
- Written by: Guido Cantini; Carmine Gallone
- Produced by: Federico Curioni; Nino Ottavi
- Starring: Maria Cebotari; Claudio Gora; Lucie Englisch
- Cinematography: Anchise Brizzi
- Edited by: Oswald Hafenrichter; Niccolò Lazzari
- Music by: Riccardo Zandonai
- Production company: Grandi Film
- Distributed by: ICI
- Release date: 29 September 1940
- Running time: 92 minutes
- Country: Italy
- Language: Italian

Love Me, Alfredo! (Italian: Amami, Alfredo!) is a 1940 Italian romantic drama film directed by Carmine Gallone and starring Maria Cebotari, Claudio Gora and Lucie Englisch. It portrays the relationship between an established opera singer and her lover an unknown composer. The title is a reference to Verdi's La Traviata. It was shot at Cinecittà Studios in Rome. The film's sets were designed by the art director Guido Fiorini.

== Cast ==
- Maria Cebotari as Maria Dalgeri
- Claudio Gora as Il compositore Giacomo Varni
- Lucie Englisch as Luisa Traller
- Paolo Stoppa as Cecè
- Luigi Almirante as Romanelli
- Aristide Baghetti as Il sovrintendente
- Carmen Fortis as Una spettatrice

== Bibliography ==
- Nowell-Smith, Geoffrey. The Companion to Italian Cinema. Cassell, 1996.
