= Carmen di Trastevere =

1962 film directed by Carmine Gallone

- Directed by: Carmine Gallone
- Written by: Lucia Drudi Demby; Carmine Gallone; Giuseppe Mangione
- Produced by: Carmine Gallone
- Starring: Giovanna Ralli; Jacques Charrier
- Cinematography: Carlo Carlini
- Music by: Angelo Francesco Lavagnino; Georges Bizet
- Release date: 1962
- Language: Italian

Carmen di Trastevere is a 1962 Italian drama film directed by Carmine Gallone and starring Giovanna Ralli. It is a loosely based on the novella Carmen by Prosper Mérimée and on the relevant opera by Georges Bizet.

== Cast ==
- Giovanna Ralli as Carmen
- Jacques Charrier as Antonio Lizzani
- Lino Ventura as Vincenzo
- Dante DiPaolo as Tom, the American Smuggler
- Fiorenzo Fiorentini as Carmen's Guitar Player
- Luigi Giuliani as Luca
- Carlo Romano as Police Commissioner
- Enzo Liberti as Vincenzo's Fat Accomplice
- Giuliano Persico as Vincenzo's Tall Accomplice
- Renato Terra as Gerardo
- Ciccio Barbi as Vincenzo's Accomplice in Black
- Anita Durante as Landlady of the Boarding House
- Alfredo Rizzo as Doorkeeper at Villa Borghese
