= The Divine Spark =

1935 British film by Carmine Gallone

- Original trade ad
- Directed by: Carmine Gallone
- Written by: Walter Reisch; Richard Benson; Emlyn Williams
- Produced by: Arnold Pressburger
- Starring: Marta Eggerth; Phillips Holmes; Benita Hume; Donald Calthrop
- Cinematography: Franz Planer
- Edited by: Fernando Tropea
- Music by: Willy Schmidt-Gentner
- Production company: Alleanza Cinematografica Italiana
- Distributed by: Gaumont British Distributors
- Release date: June 1935
- Running time: 82 minutes
- Country: United Kingdom
- Language: English

The Divine Spark is a 1935 British musical film directed by Carmine Gallone and starring Marta Eggerth, Phillips Holmes, Benita Hume and Donald Calthrop. An Italian-language version Casta Diva was shot simultaneously. Both films were made at the Tirrenia Studios in Italy.

== Plot ==
The film concerns Italian composer Vincenzo Bellini and his problems with his opera Norma (1831), which itself tells the passionate love story of a Gallican priestess of the local Celtic religion and a Roman proconsul (governor of a province). The film is unique because it uses abstract paintings-in-motion to express the passion between the two main characters.

== Cast ==
- Marta Eggerth as Maddalena Fumaroli
- Phillips Holmes as Vincenzo Bellini
- Benita Hume as Giuditta Pasta
- Donald Calthrop as Judge Fumaroli
- Arthur Margetson as Ernesto Tosi
- Edmund Breon as Gioacchino Rossini
- Basil Gill as Romanie
- Hugh Miller as Niccolo Paganini
- Edward Chapman as Saverio Mercadante
- John Clements as Fiorino
- John Deverell as King
- Felix Aylmer as Butler
- Peter Gawthorne as Felice Romani
