= The Fiery Cavalcade =

1925 film directed by Carmine Gallone

- Italian: La cavalcata ardente
- Directed by: Carmine Gallone
- Starring: Emilio Ghione
- Cinematography: Alfredo Donelli; Emilio Guattari; Giulio Rufini
- Production companies: S.A.I.C. Westi Film
- Release date: 1925
- Country: Italy
- Languages: Silent; Italian intertitles

The Fiery Cavalcade (Italian: La cavalcata ardente) is a 1925 Italian silent film directed by Carmine Gallone and starring Emilio Ghione.

== Cast ==
- Soava Gallone
- Emilio Ghione
- Jeanne Brindeau
- Americo de Giorgio
- Gabriel de Gravone
- Ciro Galvani
- Umberto Ledda
- Ignazio Lupi
- Alfredo Martinelli
- Giuseppe Pierozzi
- Fosco Risturi
- Marcella Sabbatini
- Raimondo Van Riel
