= Carlo Gualandri =

Italian actor

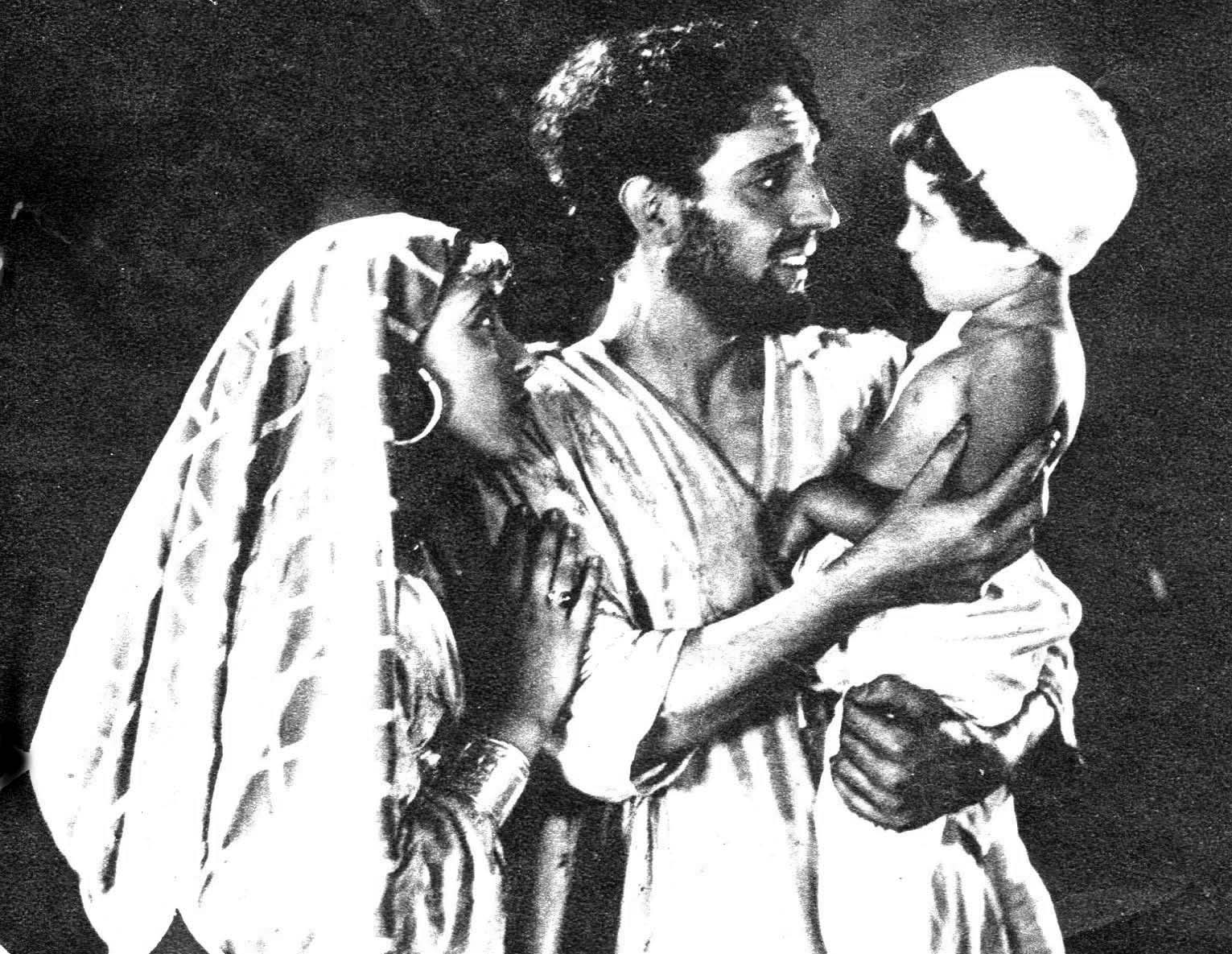
- Gualandri with Isa Pola in Miryam
- Born: 24 December 1895; Rome, Lazio, Italy
- Died: 11 April 1972 (aged 76); Reggio Emilia, Emilia-Romagna, Italy
- Occupation: Actor
- Years active: 1916-1931 (film)

Carlo Gualandri (1895–1972) was an Italian film actor.

== Selected filmography ==
- Nemesis (1920)
- The Knot (1921)
- The Last Days of Pompeii (1926)
- Miryam (1929)
- The Man with the Claw (1931)
- The Devil's Lantern (1931)

== Bibliography ==
- Ágnes Pethő. The Cinema of Sensations. Cambridge Scholars Publishing, 2015.
