= Senza colpa! =

1915 film directed by Carmine Gallone

- Directed by: Carmine Gallone
- Starring: Soava Gallone
- Release date: January 1915
- Country: Italy
- Language: Silent

Senza colpa! is a 1915 silent Italian drama film directed by Carmine Gallone.

== Cast ==
- Francesco Cacace
- Eduardo D'Accursio
- Soava Gallone
- Augusto Mastripietri
- Gina Romani
