= On with the Motley =

1920 film directed by Carmine Gallone

- Directed by: Carmine Gallone
- Written by: Lucio D'Ambra
- Starring: Soava Gallone
- Cinematography: Emilio Guattari
- Release date: 26 January 1920
- Country: Italy
- Language: Silent

On with the Motley (Italian: Amleto e il suo clown) is a 1920 silent Italian drama film directed by Carmine Gallone.

== Cast ==
- Soava Gallone as Alessandra di Tranda
- Elisa Severi as Sua madre
- Maurice De Grunewald
- Angelo Gallina
- Tatiana Gorka
- Luciano Molinari as Frere Ivre
- Renato Piacentini
- Umberto Zanuccoli
