= The Devil's Lantern =

1931 film directed by Carlo Campogalliani

- Directed by: Carlo Campogalliani
- Written by: Gian Bistolfi; Leo Menardi
- Starring: Nella Maria Bonora; Donatella Neri; Carlo Gualandri
- Cinematography: Anchise Brizzi
- Edited by: Carlo Campogalliani; Giuseppe Fatigati
- Music by: Ettore Montanaro
- Production company: Società Italiana Cines
- Distributed by: Societa Anonima Stefano Pittaluga
- Release date: October 1931
- Running time: 70 minutes
- Country: Italy
- Language: Italian

The Devil's Lantern (Italian: La lanterna del diavolo) is a 1931 Italian drama film directed by Carlo Campogalliani and starring Nella Maria Bonora, Donatella Neri, and Carlo Gualandri.

It was made at the Cines Studios in Rome.

== Cast ==
- Nella Maria Bonora
- Donatella Neri
- Carlo Gualandri as Capobanda
- Letizia Quaranta
- Carlo Tamberlani
- Raimondo Van Riel
- Alfredo Martinelli
- Guido Celano
- La Baiocchi
- Il Piccolo Lamberto

== Bibliography ==
- Mancini, Elaine. Struggles of the Italian film industry during fascism, 1930-1935. UMI Research Press, 1985.
