= First Love (1941 film) =

- Directed by: Carmine Gallone
- Written by: Lucio D'Ambra; Cesare Giulio Viola
- Starring: Leonardo Cortese; Vivi Gioi; Luigi Almirante; Valentina Cortese
- Cinematography: Václav Vích; Gábor Pogány
- Edited by: Niccolò Lazzari
- Music by: Alessandro Cicognini
- Production company: Grandi Film
- Distributed by: Industrie Cinematografiche Italiane
- Release date: 5 October 1941
- Running time: 109 minutes
- Country: Italy
- Language: Italian

First Love (Italian: Primo amore) is a 1941 Italian drama film directed by Carmine Gallone and starring Leonardo Cortese, Vivi Gioi and Luigi Almirante. It was made at the Cinecittà Studios in Rome.

== Cast ==
- Leonardo Cortese as Pietro Redi / Peter Reed
- Vivi Gioi as Jane Blue
- Luigi Almirante as Girolamo Redi
- Valentina Cortese as Nerina Redi
- Bianca Della Corte as Celeste Redi
- Clelia Matania as Silvia Redi
- Osvaldo Valenti as Giovannino Cafiero
- Giuseppe Porelli as Peppino Percoppo
- Luigi Cimara as Il maestro Giacomo Asquini
- Carlo Bressan as Il maestro Gargiulo
- Guido Celano as Il capitano del "Flavio Gioia"
- Oreste Fares as Il dottore Lanzara
- Nicola Maldacea as Don Gennaro Del Pezzo
- Dina Romano as Nannina
- Gina Ror as Donna Concetta
- Bella Starace Sainati as Zia Giovanna
- Giuseppe Varni as L'editore Wolkoff
- Augusto Marcacci
- Roberto Semprini

== Bibliography ==
- Nowell-Smith, Geoffrey & Hay, James & Volpi, Gianni. The Companion to Italian Cinema. Cassell, 1996.
