= Abbiamo vinto! =

- Film poster
- Directed by: Robert A. Stemmle
- Written by: Mario Amendola, Siro Angeli, Robert A. Stemmle
- Produced by: Giorgio Agliani
- Starring: Paolo Stoppa
- Release date: 28 January 1951
- Running time: 84 minutes
- Country: Italy
- Language: Italian

Abbiamo vinto! is a 1951 Italian comedy film directed by Robert A. Stemmle starring Paolo Stoppa.

== Cast ==
- Paolo Stoppa as Augusto Fabriano
- Camillo Pilotto as Pasquale Nardecchi
- Walter Chiari as Giorgio Silvestri
- Antonella Lualdi as Elsa Nardecchi
- Margherita Bagni as Amalia Nardecchi
- Jacqueline Pierreux as Iris
- Sergio Tofano as Temistocle Leoni
- Lilla Brignone as Giulia Casadei
- Anna Maria Bottini as Maria Bianchi
