= Giorgio Agliani =

Italian film producer

- Born: 2 October 1910; Milan, Lombardy; Italy
- Died: May 1996 (aged 85); Italy
- Occupation: Producer
- Years active: 1946–1974 (film)

Giorgio Agliani (1910–1996) was an Italian film producer. A former Italian Resistance member he got his start in film production through his involvement with the ANPI-backed neorealist films The Sun Still Rises (1946) and Tragic Hunt (1947). Many of his later films were produced in the Sword-and-sandal epic genre.

== Selected filmography ==
- The Sun Still Rises (1946)
- Tragic Hunt (1947)
- Women Without Names (1950)
- Abbiamo vinto! (1951)
- Attention! Bandits! (1951)
- Three Girls from Rome (1952)
- It Happened in the Park (1953)
- High School (1954)
- The Most Wonderful Moment (1957)
- First Love (1959)
- Minotaur, the Wild Beast of Crete (1960)
- Gladiator of Rome (1962)
- Goliath and the Rebel Slave(1963)
- Beatrice Cenci (1969)

== Bibliography ==
- Kinnard, Roy & Crnkovich, Tony . Italian Sword and Sandal Films, 1908–1990. McFarland, 2017.
- Vitti, Antonio. Giuseppe De Santis and Postwar Italian Cinema. University of Toronto Press, 1996.
