= The Ship (film) =

1921 film

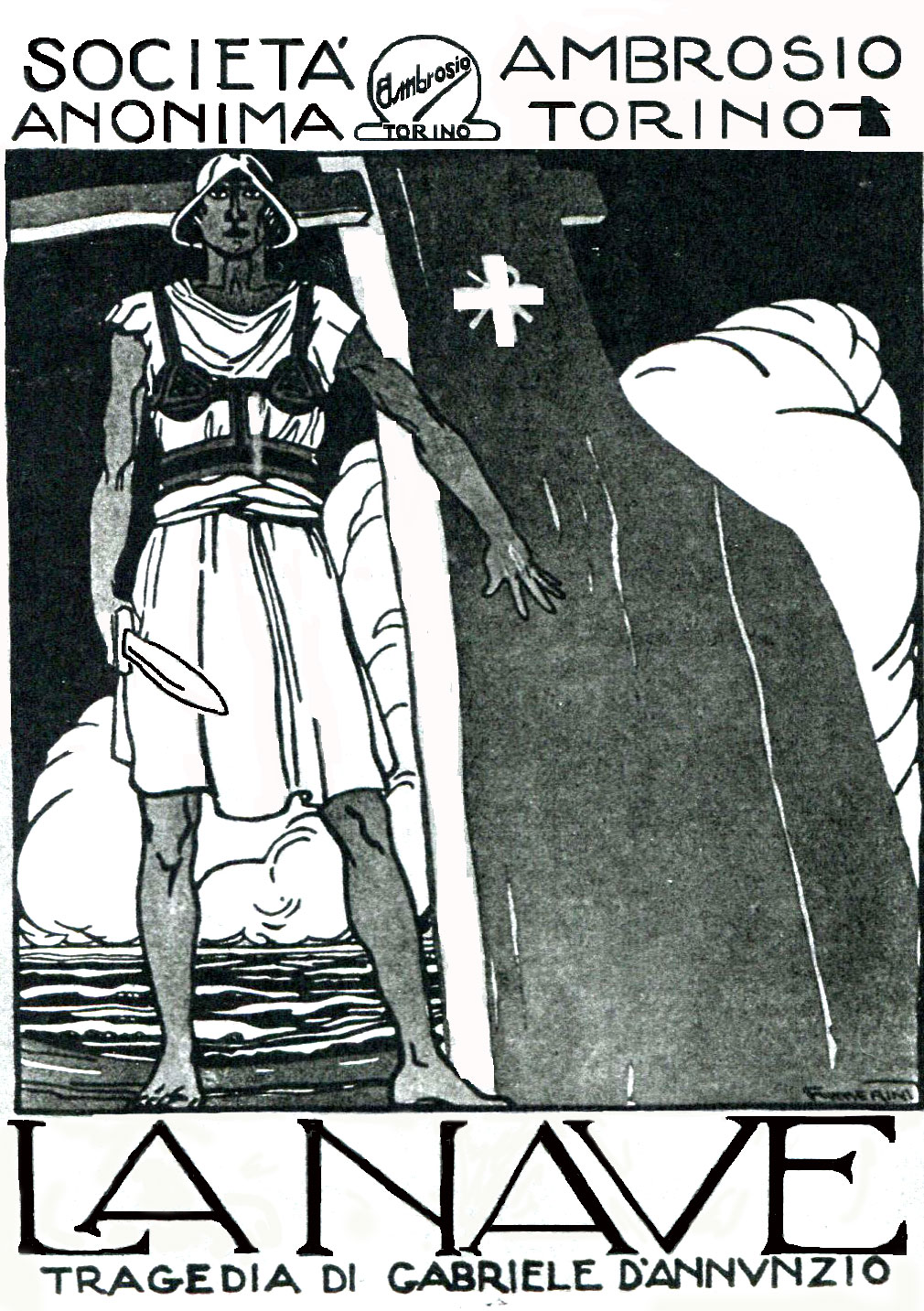
- Directed by: Gabriellino D'Annunzio; Mario Roncoroni
- Written by: Gabriele D'Annunzio (play); Gabriellino D'Annunzio
- Produced by: Arturo Ambrosio
- Starring: Ida Rubinstein; Alfredo Boccolini; Ciro Galvani
- Cinematography: Narciso Maffeis
- Music by: Ildebrando Pizzetti
- Production company: Ambrosio Film
- Distributed by: Unione Cinematografica Italiana
- Release date: 25 November 1921
- Country: Italy
- Languages: Silent; Italian intertitles

The Ship (Italian: La Nave) is a 1921 Italian silent historical drama film directed by Gabriellino D'Annunzio and Mario Roncoroni and starring Ida Rubinstein, Alfredo Boccolini, and Ciro Galvani. It is an adaptation of the play La Nave by Gabriele D'Annunzio, father of the film's director. Painter Guido Marussig designed sets and costumes for the film. Although the reception of The Ship was mixed at the time of its release, the film is now widely recognised for its artistic ambition, and is often cited as a notable example of Italian historical epic cinema from the early 1920s.

== Plot ==
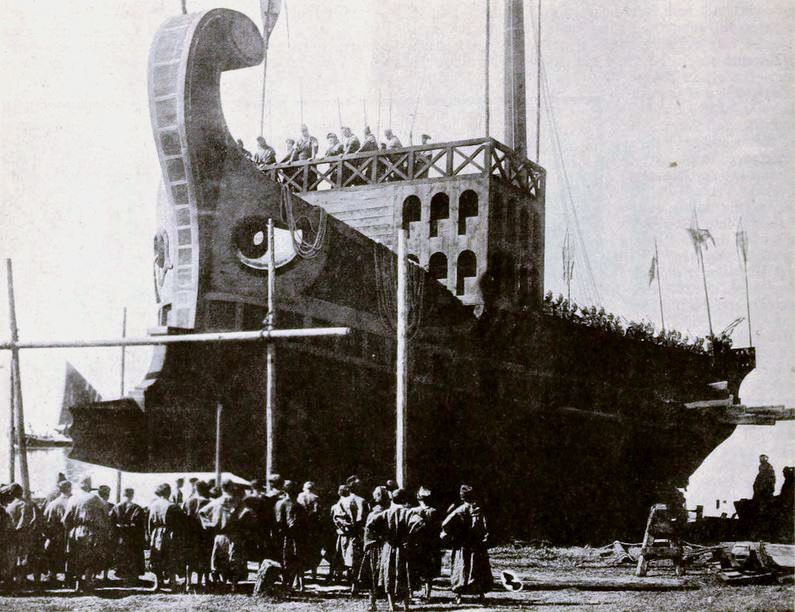

Basilioa is the daughter of Orso Faledro and is back in town in search of revenge for her father and for her brothers. The cause of the ruin of her relatives are the Graticis, a rival family. So she pretends to fall in love with both of the Gratici brothers, Marco and Sergio, pushing the two to fight to the death for the love of her. Mario is the winner, but finally he understands that he and his brother have fallen into the seductive trap of Basilioa. Mario is a tribune and uses his power to condemn the woman to the same punishment of her father Orso Faledro: blinding; but Basilioa prefers death in the flames. In the meantime barbarians are coming to the doors of the town; the people move away to found another city: Venice.

== Cast ==
- Ida Rubinstein as Basiliola
- Alfredo Boccolini as Marco Gràtico
- Ciro Galvani as Sergio Gràtico
- Mary Cleo Tarlarini as La diaconessa Ema
- Mario Mariani as Il monaco Traba

== Bibliography ==
- Nowell-Smith, Geoffrey (1996). The Oxford History of World Cinema. Oxford: Oxford University Press. ISBN 978-0198112570.
- De Berti, Raffaele; Gagetti, Elisabetta (2022). "La Nave (1921) di Gabriellino D'Annunzio e Mario Roncoroni. Tra archeologia e art déco". L’oro di Atlantide. Edizioni Kaplan. pp. 192–214. doi:10.4000/14h4s.
