= Red Roses (film) =

1940 film

- Directed by: Vittorio De Sica; Giuseppe Amato
- Written by: Aldo De Benedetti
- Produced by: Angelo Rizzoli; Giuseppe Amato
- Starring: Vittorio De Sica; Renée Saint-Cyr; Vivi Gioi
- Cinematography: Tamás Keményffy
- Edited by: Maria Rosada
- Music by: Renzo Rossellini
- Production company: Era Film
- Distributed by: Minerva Film
- Release date: 16 April 1940
- Running time: 65 minutes
- Country: Italy
- Language: Italian

Red Roses (Italian: Rose scarlatte) is a 1940 Italian "white-telephones" comedy film directed by Vittorio De Sica and Giuseppe Amato and starring De Sica, Renée Saint-Cyr, and Vivi Gioi. It was De Sica's first film as a director. De Sica had previously appeared in a 1936 production of the stage play by Aldo De Benedetti on which it was based. It was shot at the Cinecitta Studios in Rome. The film's sets were designed by the art director Gastone Medin.

== Plot ==
When Renée Saint-Cyr as Maria Verani, gets a delivery of a bunch of scarlet roses, it starts a series of events between the adulterers but the focus is on the spouses themselves. The husband Vittorio De Sica as Alberto Verani, test to see if she will betray him, but repents of his actions and goes back to her.

== Cast ==
- Vittorio De Sica as Alberto Verani
- Renée Saint-Cyr as Maria Verani
- Umberto Melnati as Tommaso Savelli
- Vivi Gioi as Clara
- Luisella Beghi as Rosina, the waitress
- Rubi Dalma as the Countess
- Carlo Ranieri as the gardener
- Livia Minelli as the flower girl
- Olga von Kollar
- Aristide Garbini

== Bibliography ==
- Cardullo, Bert. Vittorio De Sica: Actor, Director, Auteur. Cambridge Scholars Publishing, 2009.
