= Mistress of the Mountains =

- Directed by: Fernando Cerchio
- Written by: Leonardo Benvenuti; Fernando Cerchio; Giovanni Guareschi; Giorgio Venturini; Giancarlo Vigorelli
- Produced by: Giorgio Venturini
- Starring: Vivi Gioi; Adriano Rimoldi; Camillo Pilotto
- Cinematography: Arturo Gallea
- Edited by: Rolando Benedetti
- Music by: Giovanni Fusco
- Production company: Artisti Associati
- Distributed by: Variety Distribution
- Release date: 18 September 1950
- Running time: 90 minutes
- Country: Italy
- Language: Italian

Mistress of the Mountains (Italian: Gente così) is a 1950 Italian drama film directed by Fernando Cerchio and starring Vivi Gioi, Adriano Rimoldi and Camillo Pilotto.

== Plot ==
In a small town in upper Lombardy near the Swiss border, smuggling is considered legal and Don Candido intervenes in the endless discussions on business, trying to restore peace. A new elementary teacher arrives in the village, a woman with modern ideas who comes into conflict with the mentality of the inhabitants of the village. During a difficult construction of the dam, a smuggler arrives with whom the young teacher falls in love. When the young man flees to Milan, the woman follows him, only to turn back when she realizes she is pregnant. Surprised by the financial police, the smuggler falls into a ravine. Don Candido just has time to unite them in marriage, just before the young man dies.

== Cast ==
- Vivi Gioi as Teresa, la maestrina
- Adriano Rimoldi as Giàn, il contrabbandiere
- Camillo Pilotto as Don Candido, arciprete
- Renato De Carmine as Il biondino
- Marisa Mari as La biondina
- Saro Urzì as sindaco Giusà
- Alberto Archetti as Un consigliere
- Arrigo Peri as Segretario
- Nicola La Torre as Consigliere III
- Augusto Favi
- Raffaello Niccoli as Vecchio Operaio
- Raf Pindi as Nelli
- Lena Zoppegni as La bidella
- Egisto Olivieri as Consigliere II
- Luigi Tosi
- Giuliana Rivera

== Bibliography ==
- James Monaco. The Encyclopedia of Film. Perigee Books, 1991.
