= The Faces of Love (film) =

1924 film directed by Carmine Gallone

- Directed by: Carmine Gallone
- Written by: Filippo Folchi; Giorgio Mannini; Carmine Gallone (play); Ernest Legouvé (play); Eugène Scribe (play)
- Starring: Angelo Ferrari
- Production company: Films Gallone
- Distributed by: Films Gallone
- Release date: April 1924
- Country: Italy
- Languages: Silent; Italian intertitles

The Faces of Love (Italian: I volti dell'amore) is a 1924 Italian silent film directed by Carmine Gallone and starring Angelo Ferrari. It is based on the life of 18th-century French actress Adrienne Lecouvreur, whose life had been adapted into a play.

== Cast ==
In alphabetical order

- Alex Bernard
- Gina Cinquini
- Angelo Ferrari
- Soava Gallone
- Bonaventura Ibáñez
- Lydianne
- Alfredo Martinelli
- Pietro Paoli
- Giuseppe Pierozzi
- Clarette Sabatelli

== Bibliography ==
- P. D'Agostini & S. Della Casa. Cinema Italiano. Il Castoro, 1997.
