= Clifford Curzon =

English classical pianist (1907–1982)

Clifford Curzon CBE
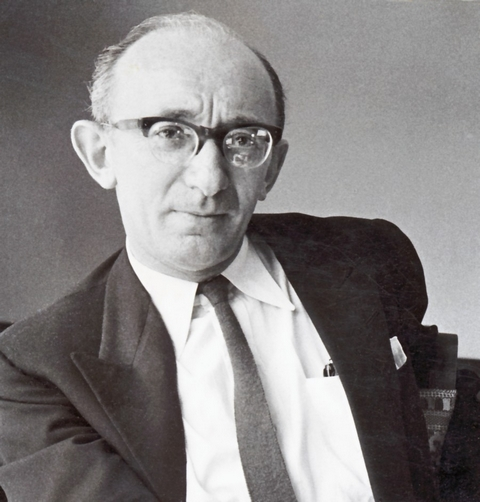
- Curzon in 1960
- Born: Clifford Michael Siegenberg; 18 May 1907; Islington, London, England
- Died: 1 September 1982 (aged 75); London, England
- Education: Royal Academy of Music
- Occupations: Composer, pianist
- Spouse: Lucille Wallace (m. 1931-1977; her death)

Sir Clifford Michael Curzon CBE (né Siegenberg; 18 May 1907 – 1 September 1982) was an English classical pianist.

Curzon studied at the Royal Academy of Music in London, and subsequently with Artur Schnabel in Berlin and Wanda Landowska and Nadia Boulanger in Paris. In his early career he was known for his performances of Romantic and virtuoso music, and for championing modern works. Later he concentrated on composers such as Mozart, Beethoven, Schubert and Brahms. He played regularly in continental Europe and North America, making tours in the 1930s and for most of his post-war career.

Although signed to a recording company, Decca, for most of his career, Curzon was not at ease in the studio, and vetoed the release of many of his recordings, some of which were published after his death.

== Life and career ==
=== Early years ===
Curzon was born in Islington, London, the younger son and second of three children of Michael Siegenberg, a Jewish antiques dealer, and his wife Constance Mary, née Young. The family name was changed to Curzon in August 1914, shortly after the outbreak of the First World War. The household was musical: Mary Curzon was a talented amateur singer, Michael's sister was a professional singer, and his uncle, the composer Albert Ketèlbey, was a frequent visitor, whose performances of his music on the family piano were the young Curzon's earliest abiding musical memories. The boy's first musical studies were as a violinist, but he soon concentrated on the piano.

In 1919 Curzon entered the Royal Academy of Music (RAM) in London, and two years later he was admitted to the senior school of the academy at the unusually early age of 14. He studied with Charles Reddie, whose own teacher, Bernhard Stavenhagen, had been a pupil of Franz Liszt. Curzon won many prizes, including the RAM's MacFarren Gold Medal, and then continued his studies with Katharine Goodson, who had been a pupil of Theodor Leschetizky. Sir Henry Wood conducted the academy's student orchestra, and in 1924 he gave Curzon his first Promenade Concert engagement, as one of the co-soloists in Bach's Triple Keyboard Concerto in D minor, along with two other students. (Note: The Oxford Dictionary of National Biography gives the year as 1922, and the Oxford Dictionary of Music gives it as 1923. The BBC's Prom archive shows the date of the concert as 3 October 1924.) Around the time Curzon was graduating, his father became seriously ill, affecting the family business; money became short, and in 1926 Curzon, though not drawn to teaching, accepted a salaried post as a sub-professor at the RAM. One of his pupils was Constance Warren, two years his senior. He continued to pursue a career as a soloist. A family friend introduced him to Sir Thomas Beecham, who was sufficiently impressed by Curzon's playing to engage him as soloist in Mozart's Coronation Concerto at the Queen's Hall.

In 1928 Curzon temporarily left the RAM. A legacy from the mother of a colleague enabled him to move to Berlin for two years, to study with Schnabel. He then studied with Landowska and Boulanger in Paris. Curzon believed his style owed much to Schnabel and Landowska. He said they disliked each other and were diametrically opposite in their musical aesthetics, but that he learned about phrasing from Schnabel and about precision of technique from Landowska.

=== Soloist ===
Curzon built a successful career as a soloist, enabling him to resign from the RAM in 1932. In addition to frequent concerts in Britain, he toured Europe in 1936 and 1938 under the auspices of the British Council, and made his US debut in 1939, returning regularly for many years after World War II. In his early years as a star soloist Curzon played a more Romantic and virtuosic repertoire than that associated with him in his later career. Established pianists of the time generally ignored concertante works by such composers as Ignacy Jan Paderewski, Vincent d'Indy and Frederick Delius, with whom Curzon made a mark. He was also known for his espousal of new music, giving premieres and early performances of works by Germaine Tailleferre, John Ireland, Alan Rawsthorne and Lennox Berkeley. During the war, shortage of time prevented him from undertaking the British premiere of Aram Khachaturian's Piano Concerto, but his friendship with Benjamin Britten led to many joint concerts by the two musicians.

Curzon was a highly self-critical performer, and though he signed with Decca in 1937 and remained with them throughout his career, he was rarely at ease in the studios, and frequently refused to allow the release of recordings in which he felt dissatisfied with his performance. (Note: Among recordings that Curzon barred from release were a 1944 Tchaikovsky First Piano Concerto conducted by Malcolm Sargent, a 1947 Wanderer Fantasy, two Mozart concertos conducted by Britten, a 1961 Liszt B minor Sonata, and three different recordings of Mozart's Piano Concerto No. 27 in B-flat, K. 595 made in 1964, 1967 and 1970. Some of these were released after his death.)

After the war Curzon began to limit his appearances in the concert hall and recording studios, devoting himself to extensive periods of private study. Throughout his career he maintained a rigorous regime of practice, playing for several hours every day.

Together with Joseph Szigeti, William Primrose and Pierre Fournier, Curzon formed the Edinburgh Festival Piano Quartet in 1952. In The Manchester Guardian, Neville Cardus wrote, "They do not quite make an easeful ensemble. The ear is constantly attracted by individual touches of fine musical art, but we receive a sense that each master is playing with his eye on the other, so as not to overstep the bounds of modesty." As a soloist Curzon made American tours between 1948 and 1970, played at European music festivals and toured the continent with the BBC Symphony Orchestra and Sir Malcolm Sargent in 1954.

From the post-war years onwards, Curzon increasingly concentrated on less virtuoso repertoire. He became celebrated for his performances of Mozart, Beethoven, Schubert and Brahms. Max Loppert, his biographer in Grove Dictionary of Music and Musicians, wrote that in the works of these Austro-German classical masters "he was unequalled for sensitivity and directness of manner, beauty of tone and an inner stillness. In such works as Mozart's Concerto in B♭ K595, his unique combination of nervous energy and Olympian calm earned him a reputation as a supreme Mozartian." Another biographer of Curzon, William Mann, wrote:

The virtues which he applied to Mozart's piano concertos—he regarded them as the most perfect music ever composed—included line-drawing that colours itself and a control of structure through harmony and feeling for ensemble, which was overwhelming when the conductor was sympathetic. He achieved them with Britten often, and also with Daniel Barenboim and Sir Colin Davis

Curzon suffered throughout his career from stage fright and, unlike most star pianists, played not from memory at concerts but with the score. In private life, Mann records, Curzon was "an ideal host, a lively raconteur, a keen connoisseur of painting and literature, and appreciative of other countries and their cultures, food, drink and language."

== Personal life ==
While still in Paris, Curzon married the American harpsichordist Lucille Wallace. They had no offspring, but adopted the soprano Maria Cebotari's two sons after she and her husband died young.

== Death ==
Curzon died in September 1982, aged 75. He is buried next to his wife in the churchyard of St Patrick's, Patterdale, near their holiday home in the Lake District. On his gravestone are inscribed the opening words of Franz von Schober's poem "An die Musik": "Du holde Kunst" (O fairest art), familiar from Schubert's setting.

== Honours ==
In 1958 Curzon was appointed Commander of the Order of the British Empire (CBE), and in 1977 he was knighted. He was elected a Fellow of the RAM in 1939, and in 1980 he received the Royal Philharmonic Society's gold medal. He was an honorary fellow of St Peter's College, Oxford (1981) and was awarded honorary doctorates by the University of Leeds (1970) and the University of Sussex (1973).

== Notes, references and sources ==
=== Sources ===
- Culshaw, John (1981). Putting the Record Straight. London: Secker & Warburg. ISBN 978-0-436-11802-9.
