= Il bacio di Cirano =

1913 film by Carmine Gallone

- Directed by: Carmine Gallone
- Written by: Lucio D'Ambra
- Starring: Soava Gallone
- Cinematography: Emilio Guattari
- Release date: 1913
- Country: Italy
- Language: Silent

Il bacio di Cirano is a 1913 silent Italian drama film directed by Carmine Gallone. It was Gallone's debut film as a director.

== Cast ==
- Umberto Zanuccoli
- Soava Gallone as Grazia
- Romano Calò as Claudio Arcieri
- Tatiana Gorka as Rosetta
- Luciano Molinari
- Renato Piacentini
- Diomede Procaccini
- Ernesto Treves
