= Avatar (1916 film) =

1916 film directed by Carmine Gallone

- Directed by: Carmine Gallone
- Starring: Soava Gallone
- Release date: 6 March 1916
- Country: Italy
- Language: Silent

Avatar is a lost Italian silent film from 1916 based on the 1856 novel Avatar by Théophile Gautier. It was directed by Carmine Gallone and starred Soava Gallone. In the UK it was also known as The Magician. It was produced by Società Italiana Cines.

== Cast ==
- Soava Gallone
- Andrea Habay
- Augusto Mastripietri
- Amleto Novelli
