= Lucille Wallace =

American pianist

Lucille Wallace Curzon
- Born: Lucille Wallace; February 22, 1898; Chicago, Illinois, US
- Died: March 21, 1977 (aged 79); London, England
- Occupations: Concert pianist and harpsichordist
- Spouse: Sir Clifford Curzon (m. 1931)

Lucille, Lady Curzon (née Wallace; 1898–1977) was a British-based American harpsichordist and student of the classical musicians Artur Schnabel, Wanda Landowska and Nadia Boulanger. She was the wife of classical pianist Sir Clifford Curzon.

== Formative years ==
Born in Chicago, Illinois on February 22, 1898, Lucille Wallace was the only child of Edward Wesley Wallace, an engineer and native of Kentucky, and Illinois native Caroline (Craig) Wallace.

She was raised in Cook County on Chicago's North Side. In 1900, she resided with her parents at their home in that city's Hyde Park section. Also living with the trio were her widowed paternal grandmother, Elizabeth Wallace (aged 64), and widowed paternal great-grandmother, Emily Duncan (aged 94).

Following her completion of her Bachelor of Music degree at the Bush Conservatory of Music in Chicago, she was accepted to Vassar College in Poughkeepsie, New York, where she pursued studies in English and history. President of Vassar's German Club, she also participated on the college's intercollegiate debate team, and performed as the accompanist for Vassar's presentation of “The Beggar's Opera” on Founder's Day, a 1923 production for which she also served as the assistant music director.

She was 25 years old when she graduated Phi Beta Kappa from the college that same year – on June 12 – along with 229 other members of the senior class. Those in attendance were treated to a performance by her of Grieg's Piano Concerto (first movement) with organ accompaniment by Professor E. Harold Geer.

Following her relocation to Europe to pursue a Vassar fellowship in history and music history at the University of Vienna from 1923 to 1924, she then pursued additional studies at the Sorbonne in France from 1924 to 1925. From 1927 to 1932, she traveled to London, Paris and Berlin to receive training from the masters Artur Schnabel, Wanda Landowska and Nadia Boulanger.

During her time with Schnabel, she lived in her own villa in Attersee, Salzkammergut, Austria, which she obtained by using funds from the inheritance she received when her father died. It was during this period of her life that she met her future husband and fellow Schnabel student, Clifford Curzon (1907—1982), a pianist from England. They courted from 1928 until their marriage on July 16, 1931, in Paris, where they were both studying with Wanda Landowska.

Wallace became a devotee of the harpsichord under Landowska's tutelage, and then went on to build a successful musical career, concertizing as a harpsichordist during the 1930s and 1940s. During this time, the couple relocated permanently to London, where they ultimately settled near Hampstead Heath.

On September 29, 1946 – the first broadcast day for the BBC's new classical music station – she performed Bach's "Goldberg Variations". Four years later, she made the decision to give up her career on the musical stage in order to become a mother to two boys who had been orphaned by friends and fellow artists, Gustav Diessl and Maria Cebotari, who had died, respectively, from a stroke and cancer.

For the remainder of her life, she devoted her time to raising her family and supporting her husband's musical career. According to O. H. Neighbour in a guide prepared for The Curzon Collection at the British Library:

Most important of all is Curzon's wife, the harpsichordist Lucille Wallace…. She studied with Landowska and Boulanger in the twenties, and also had lessons with Schnabel, so that by the time of their marriage in 1931 their natural musical affinity was reinforced by their shared experience of formative tuition. She clearly had very deep understanding of his artistic ideals, which she may indeed have helped to shape. Whereas other musicians were naturally called on only as occasion offered and usually heard him play large scale works, she kept him company in his study not only of these, but of everything he played, down to the smallest pieces.

Among the couple's circle of friends was composer Benjamin Britten. According to Britten, he and Clifford Curzon had “a long and important musical friendship,” and Curzon “performed and recorded a number of Britten works.” In addition, Britten composed “cadenzas for Haydn's Harpsichord Concerto in D Major … for Curzon's wife, the harpsichordist, Lucille Wallace….”

== Illness, death and interment ==
In 1975, Curzon suffered a stroke, which substantially diminished her quality of life. Her husband wrote to Vassar College's "alumnae office, dated March 30, 1977 ... I regret very much to have to tell you that my beloved wife passed away on March 21, 1977, after a long illness. Owing to this illness, news may not have reached Vassar that Mrs. Curzon received the title of Lady Curzon on January 1, 1977, when I was knighted by Her Majesty Queen Elizabeth."

She died in London on March 21, 1977. Following funeral services, she was laid to rest at St Patrick's Church in Patterdale, England. Her husband, Sir Clifford Curzon, died in September 1982, and was interred next to her.
