= Vivi Gioi =

Italian actress (1917–1975)

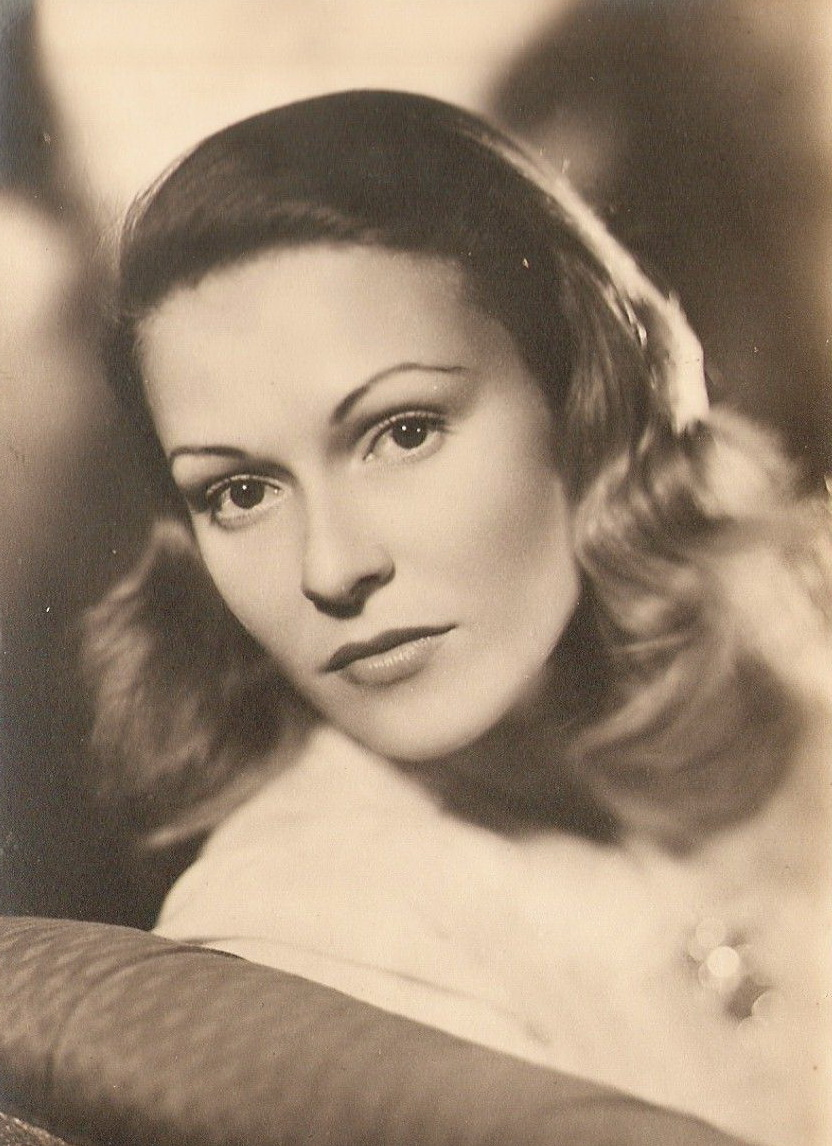
- Born: Vivienne Trumpy; 2 January 1919; Livorno, Kingdom of Italy
- Died: 12 July 1975 (aged 56); Fregene, Italy
- Occupation: Actress

Vivi Gioi (born Vivienne Trumpy; 2 January 1919 – 12 July 1975) was an Italian actress. Her alternative professional last name Diesca was an anagram of De Sica, the famous actor and director with whom she was in love. She is remembered for Il signor Max, starring Vittorio De Sica, an actor with whom she worked again in Red Roses (1940). She won a Nastro d'Argento for Best Supporting Actress for her performance in Giuseppe De Santis' film Tragic Hunt. She was the daughter of an Italian mother and a Norwegian father.

== Filmography ==
Year	Title	Role	Notes
1936	But It's Nothing Serious	Matilde	
1937	Il signor Max	Dolly	Uncredited
1939	Bionda sotto chiave	Vivetta	
1939	Frenzy	Daniela	
1939	Mille chilometri al minuto!	Figlia del scienziato	
1940	Vento di milioni	Lucy Davies	
1940	Red Roses	Clara	
1940	Alessandro sei grande!	Lucy, attrice di varietà	
1940	Cento lettere d'amore	La moglie del segretario	
1940	Then We'll Get a Divorce	Grace Peterson	
1940	La canzone rubata	Anna Berti	
1941	Il pozzo dei miracoli	Clara Tolnay	
1941	The Actor Who Disappeared	L'attrice	
1941	The Secret Lover	Diana Ponzio	
1941	First Love	Jane Blue	
1942	Giungla	La dottoressa Virginia Larsen	
1942	Bengasi	Giuliana	
1942	Seven Years of Good Luck	Ella Jüttner	
1942	Piazza San Sepolcro	La spia inglese	
1943	Lascia cantare il cuore	Lisa "Lissy" Rossi	
1943	Short Circuit	Cristina Redy	
1943	Harlem	Muriel	
1943	Seven Years of Happiness	Frau Lissy Müller	
1944	Night Shift	Hélène Jansen	
1945	The Whole City Sings	Pepita	
1945	La casa senza tempo	Anna Mendes / Marta	
1947	Tragic Hunt	Daniela 'Lili Marlene'	
1949	The Earth Cries Out	Judith	
1950	Mistress of the Mountains	Teresa, la maestrina	
1950	Women Without Names	Hilda von Schwartzendorf the Nazi	
1950	The Bread Peddler	Jeanne Fortier aka Lise Perrin	
1951	Without a Flag	Helga Grueber	
1956	Rice Girl	Maria Nardi	
1963	The Verona Trial	Donna Rachele	
1967	Kill the Wicked!	Molly Verner	
1974	The Silkworm	Costa's ex lover	(final film role)
