= Casta Diva (1935 film) =

1935 film directed by Carmine Gallone

- Directed by: Carmine Gallone
- Written by: Walter Reisch; Corrado Alvaro
- Produced by: Giuseppe Amato; William Szekeley
- Starring: Mártha Eggerth; Lamberto Picasso; Gualtiero Tumiati
- Cinematography: Franz Planer; Massimo Terzano
- Edited by: Fernando Tropea
- Music by: Willy Schmidt-Gentner
- Production company: Alleanza Cinematografica Italiana
- Distributed by: Generalcine
- Release dates: 14 June 1935 (France); 10 August 1935 (Italy)
- Running time: 87 minutes
- Country: Italy
- Language: Italian

Casta Diva is a 1935 Italian musical drama film directed by Carmine Gallone and starring Mártha Eggerth, Lamberto Picasso and Gualtiero Tumiati. The film won Best Italian Film at the 1935 Venice International Film Festival. An English-language version The Divine Spark was made at the same time, also directed by Gallone and starring Eggerth. Gallone remade the film in 1954 in Technicolor.

The film's sets were designed by the art directors Werner Schlichting and Enrico Verdozzi. Location shooting took place around Catania in Sicily.

In Bellini's opera, Norma, the soprano's plea to the moon goddess in Act I begins Casta diva, and the aria is well known by that name.

== Plot ==
The film concerns Italian composer Vincenzo Bellini and his problems with his opera Norma (1831), which itself tells the passionate love story of a Gallican priestess of the local Celtic religion and a Roman proconsul (governor of a province). The film is unique because it uses abstract paintings-in-motion to express the passion between the two main characters.

== Cast ==
- Mártha Eggerth as Maddelena Fumarol
- Sandro Palmieri as Vincenzo Bellini
- Gualtiero Tumiati as Niccolò Paganini
- Lamberto Picasso as Fumaroli
- Achille Majeroni as Gioacchino Rossini
- Lina Marengo as a guest
- Giulio Donadio as Felice Romani
- Ennio Cerlesi as Ernesto Tosi
- Vasco Creti as Rettore del Conservatorio
- Bruna Dragoni as Giuditta Pasta
- Maurizio D'Ancora as Saverio Mercadante
- Cesare Bettarini as Francesco Fiorino
- Alfredo Robert as Ferdinand I of the Two Sicilies
- Gino Viotti as Maestro Zingarelli
