= Odessa in Flames =

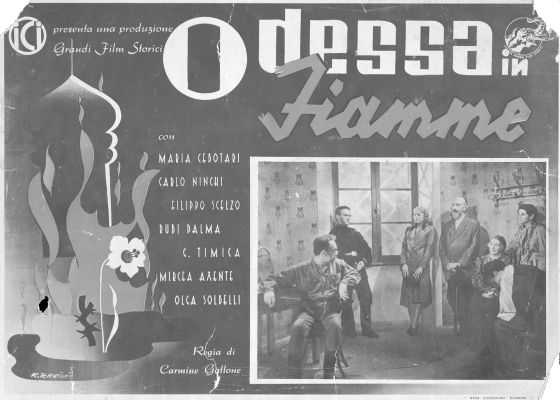
- Directed by: Carmine Gallone
- Written by: Nicolae Kiritescu; Gherardo Gherardi
- Starring: Maria Cebotari; Carlo Ninchi; Filippo Scelzo; Olga Solbelli
- Cinematography: Anchise Brizzi
- Edited by: Niccolò Lazzari
- Music by: Pietro Sassoli; Ion Vasilescu
- Production companies: Grandi Film; Oficiul National Cinematografiei
- Distributed by: ICI
- Release date: 14 September 1942
- Running time: 83 minutes
- Countries: Italy; Romania
- Language: Italian

Odessa in Flames (Italian: Odessa in fiamme, Romanian: Odessa în flăcări) is a 1942 Italian-Romanian propaganda war film directed by Carmine Gallone and starring Maria Cebotari, Carlo Ninchi and Filippo Scelzo. The film is about the Battle of Odessa in 1941, where the city was taken in an operation that was primarily conducted by Romanian forces and elements of the German Army's 11th Army.

It is an anti-communist propaganda work focusing on a family trapped in Soviet-occupied Bessarabia and its eventual liberation by Axis forces during Operation Barbarossa. It was screened at the 1942 Venice Film Festival. It was made at the Cinecittà Studios in Rome. The sets were designed by the art director Guido Fiorini. Location shooting took place in Axis-occupied Odessa and Moldova as well as Romania.

== Plot ==
Maria Cebotari played the role of Maria Teodorescu, an opera singer from Bessarabia, who is in Chișinău with her 8-year-old son at the time of the invasion. The boy is taken somewhere in Odessa. The mother is told that he will be maintained in a camp where he will be educated as a man and a Soviet. To get her son back she agrees to sing Russian songs in theaters and taverns. There, she shares pictures of her past. One such image is found by chance by her husband, who is in the Romanian army with the rank of captain. In the end, the family reunites.

Because of the invasion of Bucharest by Soviet troops in 1944 the movie was banned and the actors were arrested. Many such movies were either destroyed or censored. Nothing was heard of this movie for more than 50 years. However, it was rediscovered in the Cinecittà archives in Rome and was shown for the first time in Romania in December 2006.

== Cast ==
- Maria Cebotari as Maria Teodorescu
- Carlo Ninchi as Il capitano Sergio Teodorescu
- Filippo Scelzo as Michele Smirnoff
- Olga Solbelli as Luba
- Rubi D'Alma as Florica, l'amante di Michele
- George Timica as Giovanni Alexis
- Silvia Dumitrescu-Timica as Anna, la moglie di Giovanni
- Mircea Axente as Pietro
- Maurizio Romitelli as Nico
- Paolo Ferrari as Paolo
- Gilda Marchiò as Ila
- Giuseppe Varni as Lo scrivone
- Checco Rissone as Gruscenko
- Adele Garavaglia as La nonna del bambino malato
- Bella Starace Sainati as La vecchietta

== Bibliography ==
- Michael Laffan & Max Weiss. Facing Fear: The History of an Emotion in Global Perspective. Princeton University Press, 2012.
- Reich, Jacqueline & Garofalo, Piero. Re-viewing Fascism: Italian Cinema, 1922-1943. Indiana University Press, 2002.
