= Nemesis (1920 film) =

1920 film directed by Carmine Gallone

- German release poster
- Directed by: Carmine Gallone
- Written by: Paul Bourget (novel); Lucio D'Ambra
- Starring: Soava Gallone
- Cinematography: Emilio Guattari
- Production company: D'Ambra Film
- Distributed by: UCI
- Release date: 11 December 1920
- Country: Italy
- Languages: Silent; Italian intertitles

Nemesis is a 1920 Italian silent film directed by Carmine Gallone and starring Ida De Bonis, Soava Gallone, and Ciro Galvani.

== Cast ==
- Ida De Bonis
- Soava Gallone as Elisa di Roannez
- Ciro Galvani as Roudin
- Carlo Gualandri as Ugo Cordin
- Lorenzino Pery
- R. Scomox
- Gino Viotti
- Achille Vitti

== Bibliography ==
- Geoffrey Nowell-Smith. The Companion to Italian Cinema. Cassell, 1996.
