= Luciano Molinari =

Italian stage and film actor

- Born: 13 December 1880; Garlasco, Lombardy, Italy
- Died: 27 July 1940 (aged 59); Turin, Piedmont, Italy
- Occupation: Actor
- Years active: 1913–1934 (film)

Luciano Molinari (1880–1940) was an Italian stage and film actor.

== Selected filmography ==
- Il bacio di Cirano (1913)
- On with the Motley (1920)
- Five to Nil (1932)
- Three Lucky Fools (1933)
- Cardinal Lambertini (1934)

== Bibliography ==
- Goble, Alan. The Complete Index to Literary Sources in Film. Walter de Gruyter, 1999.
