= Miryam (film) =

1929 film

- Directed by: Enrico Guazzoni
- Written by: Enrico Guazzoni
- Produced by: Enrico Guazzoni
- Starring: Isa Pola; Carlo Gualandri; Aristide Garbini
- Cinematography: Arturo Climati; Carlo Montuori
- Production company: Suprema Film
- Distributed by: Suprema Film
- Release date: 31 March 1929
- Country: Italy
- Languages: Silent; Italian intertitles

Miryam is a 1929 Italian silent drama film directed by Enrico Guazzoni and starring Isa Pola, Carlo Gualandri, and Aristide Garbini.

== Cast ==
- Isa Pola as Myriam
- Aristide Garbini as Ibrahim
- Carlo Gualandri as Mario Palmi
- Isa Buzzanca as Ulema

== Bibliography ==
- Liliana Ellena. Film d'Africa: film italiani prima, durante e dopo l'avventura coloniale. Archivio nazionale cinematografico della Resistenza, 1999.
