= The Knot (1921 film) =

1921 film

- Directed by: Gaston Ravel
- Starring: Elena Lunda; Carlo Gualandri; Francesca Bertini
- Production companies: Bertini Film; Caesar Film
- Distributed by: Caesar Film
- Release date: July 1921
- Country: Italy
- Languages: Silent; Italian intertitles

The Knot (Italian: Il nodo) is a 1921 Italian silent film directed by Gaston Ravel and starring Elena Lunda, Carlo Gualandri, and Francesca Bertini.

== Bibliography ==
- Ágnes Pethő. The Cinema of Sensations. Cambridge Scholars Publishing, 2015.
