= Rubi Dalma =

Italian actress (1906–1994)

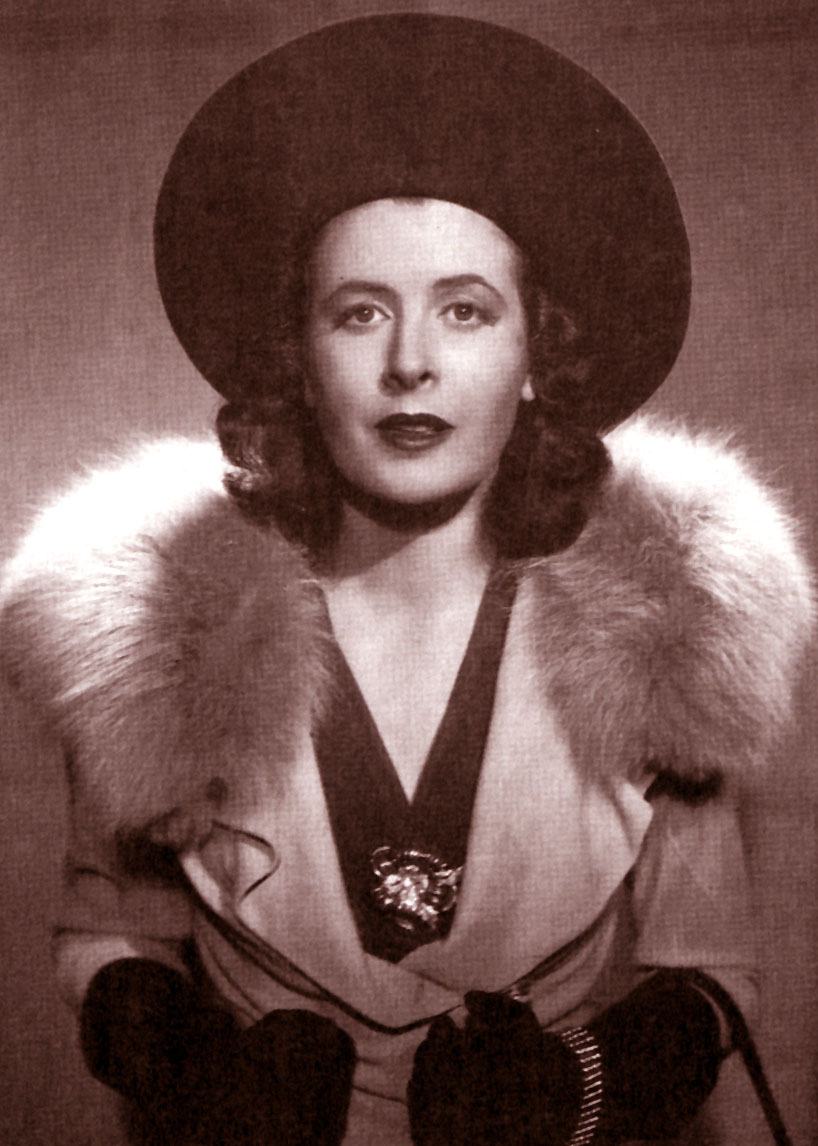
- Born: Giusta Manca di Villahermosa; 24 April 1906; Milan, Kingdom of Italy
- Died: 7 August 1994 (aged 88); Castel Gandolfo, Rome, Italy
- Occupation: Actress
- Years active: 1937–1953 (film)

Rubi Dalma (24 April 1906 – 7 August 1994) was an Italian actress.

== Life and career ==
Born Giusta Manca di Villahermosa in Milan, she belonged to an aristocratic family from the Sardinian town of Sassari. After a bit part in the Camillo Mastrocinque's film Regina della Scala, in which she basically played herself, Manca di Villahermosa decided to start a career as an actress and she adopted the stage name Rubi Dalma (sometimes spelled as Rubi D'Alma or Ruby Dalma). Her breakout role was as the aristocrat donna Paola unsuccessfully courted by Vittorio De Sica in Mario Camerini's Il signor Max. From then Dalma started a successful career, even if often limited to stereotyped roles of cold, sophisticated and sometimes snobbish noblewomen. After the war she mainly appeared in character roles and, gradually, moved away from the cinema industry.

== Selected filmography ==
- Il signor Max (1937)
- Queen of the Scala (1937)
- Hurricane in the Tropics (1939)
- Heartbeat (1939)
- Red Roses (1940)
- Antonio Meucci (1940)
- A Pistol Shot (1942)
- Odessa in Flames (1942)
- C'è sempre un ma! (1942)
- Calafuria (1943)
- Daniele Cortis (1947)
- Heaven over the Marshes (1949)
- Story of a Love Affair (1950, dir. Michelangelo Antonioni)
- Eager to Live (1953)
