= Alfredo Donelli =

Italian cinematographer

- Occupation: Cinematographer
- Years active: 1915–1929

Alfredo Donelli was a leading Italian cinematographer who worked on a number of silent films including the largely abandoned Italian-shot scenes of MGM's blockbuster Ben-Hur: A Tale of the Christ (1925). For Italian studios he worked on big-budget epics such as Quo Vadis (1924) and The Last Days of Pompeii (1926).

Along with Edmundo Orlandi he invented the Avia compact camera.

== Selected filmography ==
- Francesca da Rimini (1922)
- Quo Vadis (1924)
- The Fiery Cavalcade (1925)
- Ben-Hur: A Tale of the Christ (1925)
- The Last Days of Pompeii (1926)
- The Storyteller of Venice (1929)
- Girls Do Not Joke (1929)

== Bibliography ==
- Souto, H. Mario Raimondo. Motion Picture Photography: A History, 1891-1960. McFarland, 2007.
