= Through the Shadows =

1923 film

- Directed by: Carmine Gallone
- Cinematography: Emilio Guattari
- Production company: Films Gallone
- Release date: May 1923
- Country: Italy
- Languages: Silent; Italian intertitles

Through the Shadows (Italian: La madre folle) is a 1923 Italian silent film directed by Carmine Gallone.

== Cast ==
- Yvonne Fleuriel
- Frisco
- Mario Fumagalli
- Soava Gallone
- Arnold Kent
- Nella Montagna
- Giuseppe Pierozzi
- Fosco Risturi
- Raimondo Van Riel

== Bibliography ==
- Ken Wlaschin. The Silent Cinema in Song, 1896-1929: An Illustrated History and Catalog of Songs Inspired by the Movies and Stars, with a List of Recordings. McFarland & Company, 2009.
