= Nella Maria Bonora =

Italian actress (1904–1990)

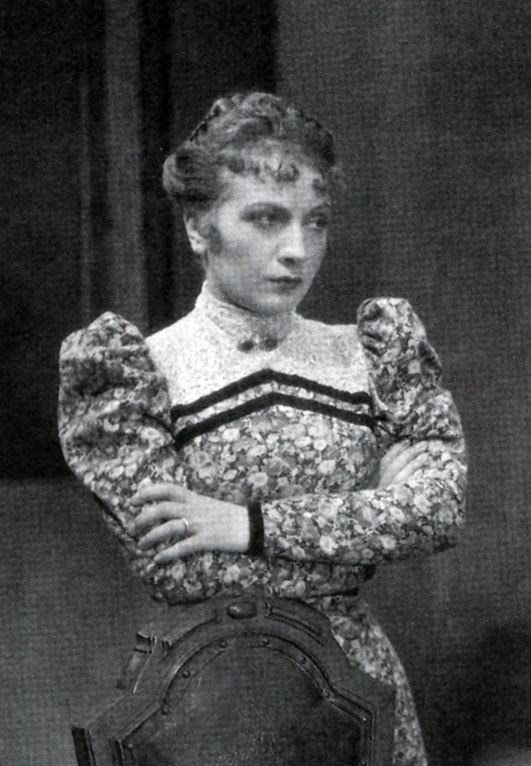
- Bompra om 1937
- Born: 19 May 1904; Mantua, Lombardy, Italy
- Died: 3 August 1990 (aged 86); Florence, Tuscany, Italy
- Occupation: Actress
- Years active: 1931–1940 (film)

Nella Maria Bonora (19 May 1904 – 3 August 1990) was an Italian actress of film, radio and stage. She also worked as a prominent voice actress, dubbing foreign films for release in the Italian market.

== Selected filmography ==
- The Devil's Lantern (1931)
- The Old Lady (1932)
- The Last Adventure (1932)
- The Wedding March (1934)
- The Two Sergeants (1936)
- The Former Mattia Pascal (1937)
- The Two Misanthropists (1937)

== Bibliography ==
- Landy, Marcia. Fascism in Film: The Italian Commercial Cinema, 1931-1943. Princeton University Press, 2014.
