= Alfredo Boccolini =

Italian actor (1885–1956)

- Born: 29 December 1885; La Spezia, Italy
- Died: 5 February 1956 (aged 70); Viadana, Italy
- Occupation: Actor
- Years active: 1917–1939

Alfredo Boccolini (29 December 1885 –5 February 1956) was an Italian actor. He appeared in more than ten films from 1917 to 1939.

== Selected filmography ==
Year	Title	Role	Notes
1917	Il siluramento dell'Oceania		
1921	The Ship		
1922	Samson and Delilah	Samson	
