= The Storyteller of Venice =

1929 film

- Directed by: Retti Marsani
- Written by: Elio Zorzi
- Starring: Hertha von Walther; Luigi Serventi
- Cinematography: Alfredo Donelli; Gabriele Gabrielian
- Production company: Suprema Film
- Distributed by: Suprema Film
- Release date: February 1929
- Running time: 71 minutes
- Country: Italy
- Languages: Silent; Italian intertitles

The Storyteller of Venice (Italian: Il Cantastorie di Venezia) is a 1929 Italian silent comedy film directed by Retti Marsani and starring Hertha von Walther and Luigi Serventi.

== Cast ==
- Luigi Serventi as Adolfo
- Hertha von Walther as Nina
- Pietro Cimarro as il barone
- Daisy Lorand as Maria Rosa
- Roberto Pasetti as Marco, il cantastorie
- Gildo Bocci
- Alfredo Martinelli

== Bibliography ==
- Reich, Jacqueline & Garofalo, Piero. Re-viewing Fascism: Italian Cinema, 1922-1943. Indiana University Press, 2002.
