= The Secret Lover =

- Directed by: Carmine Gallone
- Written by: Gherardo Gherardi
- Produced by: Federico Curloni; Carmine Gallone
- Starring: Alida Valli; Fosco Giachetti; Vivi Gioi; Osvaldo Valenti
- Cinematography: Václav Vích
- Music by: Felice Montagnini
- Production company: Grandi Film
- Distributed by: ICI
- Release date: 27 September 1941
- Running time: 101 minutes
- Country: Italy
- Language: Italian

The Secret Lover (Italian: L'amante segreta) is a 1941 Italian drama film directed by Carmine Gallone and starring Alida Valli, Fosco Giachetti and Vivi Gioi. It was made at Cinecittà in Rome.

== Plot ==
After her tutor embezzles and squanders her inheritance, a young woman is forced to seek work in a series of different occupations.

== Cast ==
- Alida Valli as Renata Croci
- Fosco Giachetti as Giorgio Amholt
- Vivi Gioi as Diana Ponzio
- Osvaldo Valenti as Valentini
- Luigi Almirante as Il pittore Riganti
- Camillo Pilotto as Giacomo Mori
- Ada Dondini as Antonia Mori
- Bella Starace Sainati as La contessa Bianca Lotti
- Anita Farra as Teresa Amholt
- Luigi Pavese as Melchiorri
- Carlo Lombardi as L'attore Mario Fulvi
- Arturo Bragaglia as Il ragionere
- Jacchi Gambino as Krick
- Claudio Ermelli as Il cameriere Ottaviano
- Giuseppe Pierozzi as Marini
- Luigi Erminio D'Olivo as Il barone
- Marina Doge as Un'amica di Renata
- Fedele Gentile as Un amico di Renata
- Mario Giannini as Un amico di Renata
- Mara Landi as Un'amica di Renata
- Alfredo Martinelli as Un cliente dell'albergo
- Edda Soligo as La cameriera dell'albergo
- Alfredo Varelli as Un amico di Renata
- Giuseppe Varni as Il portiere dell'albergo

== Bibliography ==
- Gundle, Stephen. Mussolini's Dream Factory: Film Stardom in Fascist Italy. Berghahn Books, 2013.
- Nowell-Smith, Geoffrey & Hay, James & Volpi, Gianni. The Companion to Italian Cinema. Cassell, 1996.
