= Fricsay =

Fricsay is a Hungarian surname. Notable people with the surname include:

- András Fricsay (1942–2024), German actor and director
- Ferenc Fricsay (1914–1963), Hungarian conductor
