= Redemption (1919 film) =

1919 film directed by Carmine Gallone

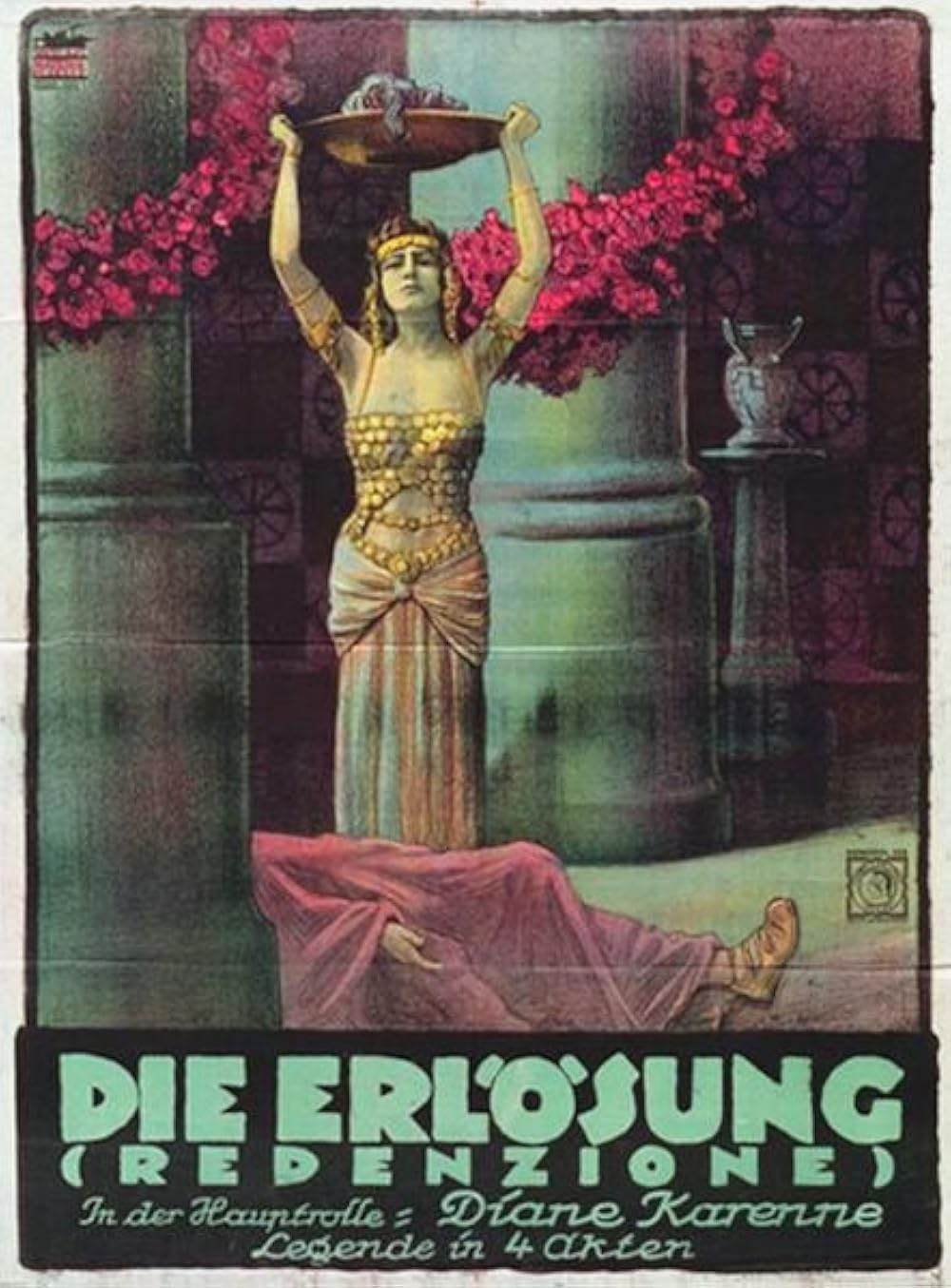
- German poster
- Directed by: Carmine Gallone
- Written by: Fausto Salvatori
- Starring: Diana Karenne; Alberto Pasquali; Elisa Severi
- Production company: Medusa Film
- Distributed by: Medusa Film; Gaumont Film (France)
- Release date: 1 March 1919
- Running time: 80 minutes
- Country: Italy
- Language: Silent

Redemption (Italian: Redenzione) is a 1919 silent Italian drama film directed by Carmine Gallone and starring Diana Karenne, Alberto Pasquali and Elisa Severi.

== Cast ==
- Diana Karenne as Maria di Magdala
- Alberto Pasquali as Gesù
- Pépa Bonafé as Salomè
- Luigi Rossi as Erode
- Elisa Severi as Erodiade
- Camillo De Rossi as Il Centurione
- Palloe as Mercante Egizio
- Luigi Duse
- Salvatore Mereu
- Salvatore Ramponi
