= A Doll Wife =

1919 film directed by Carmine Gallone

- Directed by: Carmine Gallone
- Written by: Washington Borg
- Starring: Soava Gallone
- Cinematography: Emilio Guattari
- Release date: 14 March 1919
- Country: Italy
- Language: Silent

A Doll Wife (Italian: Maman poupée) is a 1919 silent Italian drama film directed by Carmine Gallone. The film was shown as part of the Silent Divas of the Italian Cinema programme at the 38th New York Film Festival in 2000.

== Cast ==
- Soava Gallone as Susanne di Montalto, detta Maman Poupée
- Bruno Emanuel Palmi as Il marito
- Mina D'Orvella as La rivale
- Mario Cusmich
