= Alberto Pasquali =

Italian actor (1882–1929)

- Born: 24 August 1882; Turin, Piedmont, Italy
- Died: 15 February 1929 (aged 46); Milan, Lombardy, Italy
- Occupation: Actor
- Years active: 1916-1929 (film)

Alberto Pasquali (24 August 1882 – 15 February 1929) was an Italian stage and film actor of the silent era.

== Selected filmography ==
- Christus (1916)
- Redemption (1919)
- Pleasure Train (1924)
- Latest Night News (1924)
- The Passion of St. Francis (1927)
- Kif Tebbi (1928)
- The Last Tsars (1928)
- Call at Midnight (1929)

== Bibliography ==
- Ann C. Paietta. Saints, Clergy and Other Religious Figures on Film and Television, 1895–2003. McFarland, 2005.
