= Aristide Garbini =

Italian actor (1890–1950)

- Born: 9 April 1890; Rome, Lazio, Italy
- Died: 3 February 1950 (aged 59); Rome, Lazio, Italy
- Occupation: Actor
- Years active: 1918–1950 (film)

Aristide Garbini (1890–1950) was an Italian film actor.

== Selected filmography ==
- The Crusaders (1918)
- Messalina (1924)
- Miryam (1929)
- Five to Nil (1932)
- Ragazzo (1934)
- The Old Guard (1934)
- Aldebaran (1935)
- King of Diamonds (1936)
- Doctor Antonio (1937)
- The Count of Brechard (1938)
- Heartbeat (1939)
- Hurricane in the Tropics (1939)
- Father For a Night (1939)
- Guest for One Night (1939)
- Two on a Vacation (1940)
- The Sinner (1940)
- Antonio Meucci (1940)
- Red Tavern (1940)
- Red Roses (1940)
- The Prisoner of Santa Cruz (1941)
- After Casanova's Fashion (1942)
- Street of the Five Moons (1942)
- Non ti pago! (1942)
- Four Steps in the Clouds (1942)
- The Last Wagon (1943)
- Mist on the Sea (1944)
- Romulus and the Sabines (1945)
- Unknown Man of San Marino (1946)
- The Opium Den (1947)
- Bullet for Stefano (1947)
- Mad About Opera (1948)
- Yvonne of the Night (1949)
- Ring Around the Clock (1950)

== Bibliography ==
- Verdone, Luca. I film di Alessandro Blasetti. Gremese Editore, 1989.
