= La storia di un peccato =

1918 film directed by Carmine Gallone

- Directed by: Carmine Gallone
- Written by: Stefan Żeromski
- Starring: Soava Gallone
- Cinematography: Giulio Rufini
- Release date: April 1918
- Country: Italy
- Language: Silent

La storia di un peccato (English: The story of a sin) is a 1918 silent Italian drama film based on the novel by Polish writer Stefan Żeromski of the same title directed by Carmine Gallone.

== Cast ==
- Soava Gallone
- Ciro Galvani
- Tony Kirkland
- Bruno Emanuel Palmi
- Mario Parpagnoli
- Guido Trento
