= Soava Gallone =

Polish actress (1880–1957)

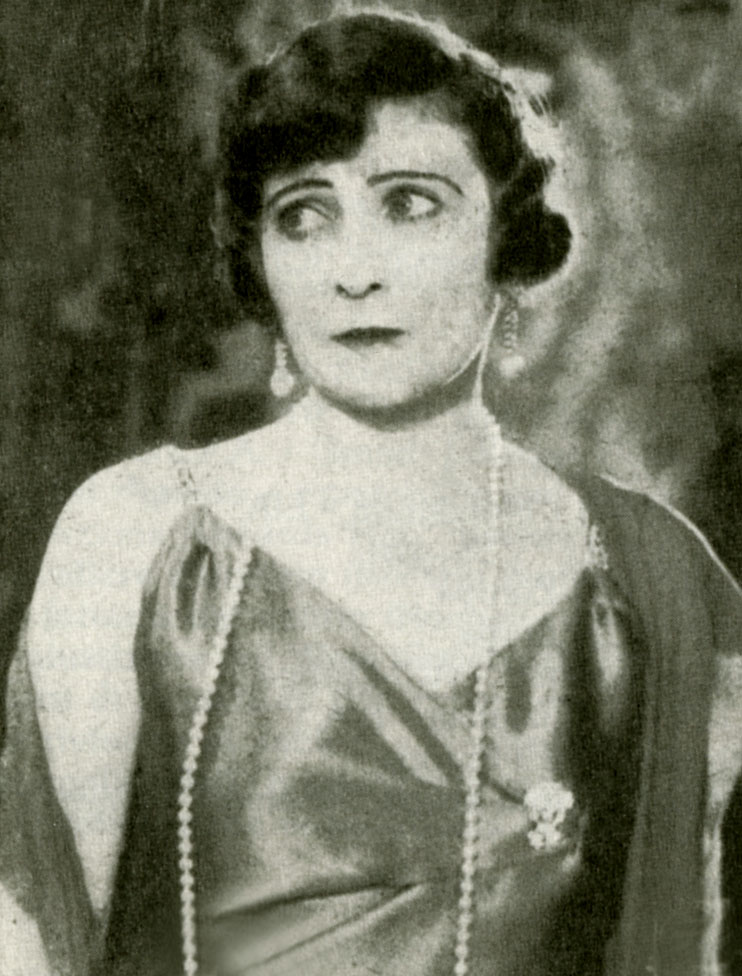
- Born: Stanisława Winawerówna; 1880; Warsaw, Poland
- Died: 30 May 1957 (aged 76–77); Rome, Italy
- Occupation: Actress
- Years active: 1913–1931
- Spouse: Carmine Gallone
- Relatives: Giuseppe Varni (brother); Regina Winawer (mother)

Soava Gallone, née Stanisława Winawerówna (1880 – 30 May 1957) was a Polish and later Italian film actress who appeared in early Italian cinema. She appeared in more than 40 films between 1913 and 1931. She was the wife of film director Carmine Gallone. Her mother was the Polish writer Regina Winawer. Her younger brother Józef Bruno Winawer (known in Italy by the stage name Giuseppe Varni) was also an actor.

== Selected filmography ==
- Il bacio di Cirano (1913)
- Senza colpa! (1915)
- Sotto le tombe (1915)
- Avatar (1916)
- La storia di un peccato (1918)
- A Doll Wife (1919)
- On with the Motley (1920)
- Nemesis (1920)
- Through the Shadows (1923)
- The Faces of Love (1924)
- The Fiery Cavalcade (1925)
- The Doctor's Secret (1931)
