= Elisa Severi =

Italian actress (1872–1930)

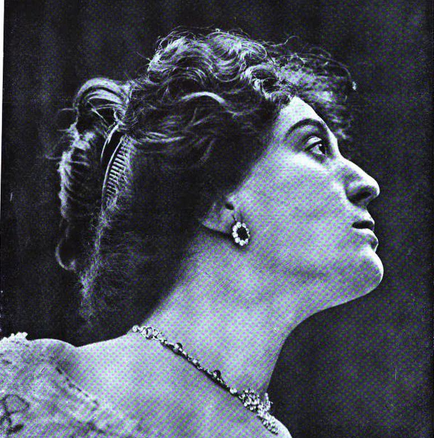
Elisa Severi, from a 1905 publication.

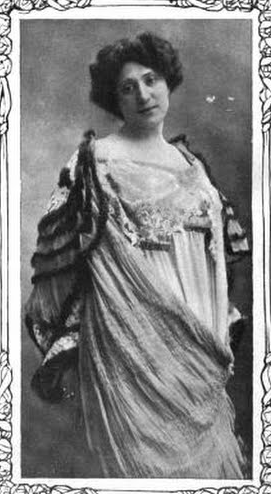
Elisa Severi, from a 1908 publication.

Elisa Severi (6 April 1872 – 26 August 1930) was an Italian actress.

== Early life ==
Elisa Severi was born in Ravenna. She trained as an actress in Rome, where she debuted in the 1889-1890 season.

== Career ==
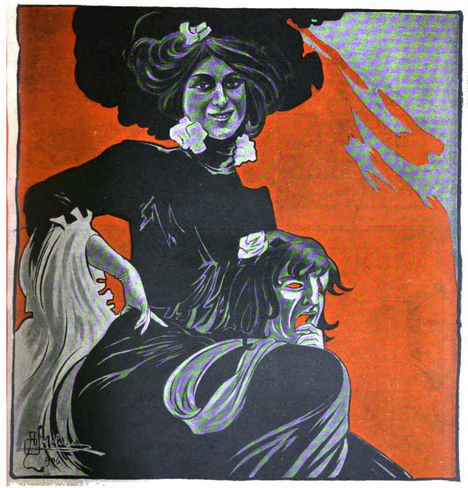
A portrait of Elisa Severi, on the cover of a 1907 magazine.

Elisa Severi started as a stage actress. She joined the Drammatica Compagnia Palladini-Talli in 1894, and headed a company with Oreste Calabresi for the 1905-1906 season, with Mercedes Brignone as one of the company's other actresses. and became a member of Ettore Berti's Compagnia Stabile Romana in 1912. A reviewer of her stage work called her "una splendida creatura vibrante di passione sentida" (a splendid creature vibrating with sentimental passion).

Severi appeared in twenty silent films between 1913 and 1921, among them La corsa all'amore (1914), La contessa Fedra (1914), Circe moderna (1914), Il bacio di sirena (1915), Redemption (1919), Dopo il suicidio (1920), L'erma biffronte (1920), On with the Motley (1920), and Sublime rinuncia (1921).

== Personal life ==
Severi had a son, editor and translator Giorgio Monicelli (1910-1968), whose father was journalist Tomaso Monicelli. Her son coined the Italian word fantascienza for the science fiction magazine Urania. She died in Rome in 1930, aged 58 years. A park in Ravenna is named for Elisa Severi.
