= The Thirteenth Man =

1917 film directed by Carmine Gallone

- Directed by: Carmine Gallone
- Written by: Lucio D'Ambra; Honoré de Balzac
- Starring: Lyda Borelli
- Cinematography: Giovanni Grimaldi
- Release date: October 1917
- Country: Italy
- Language: Silent

The Thirteenth Man (Italian: La storia dei tredici) is a 1917 silent Italian drama film directed by Carmine Gallone.

== Cast ==
- Lyda Borelli
- Ugo Piperno
- Sandro Salvini
