= Luigi Freddi =

Italian journalist and politician

Luigi Freddi (12 June 1895, Milan – 17 March 1977, Sabaudia) was an Italian journalist and politician, principally notable for being the first vice seсretary of the Fasci italiani all'estero, and later one of those most responsible for Italian political cinema in the second half of the 1930s and the start of the 1940s.

== Biography ==
As a futurist and a legionario fiumano (see Italian Regency of Carnaro), he edited Il Popolo d'Italia and in 1920 was one of the founders of the student avant-garde within the fighting Italian Fascist party and became director of the review Giovinezza.

He was then head press officer of the PNF (1923–24), vicesegretario (vice-secretary) of the Fasci italiani all'estero (FIE) (1927) and vice-director of the Exhibition of the Fascist Revolution.

In 1934 he was made head of the General Directorate of Cinematography, the Fascist organisation controlling cinema. Freddi aimed to create an entertainment cinema on the American type, imitating the commercial Hollywood model instead of the Soviet propaganda model. The Cinecittà studios (of which he became a director) and the Centro sperimentale di cinematografia film school were founded under his direction.
