= Lucio D'Ambra =

Italian writer and film director

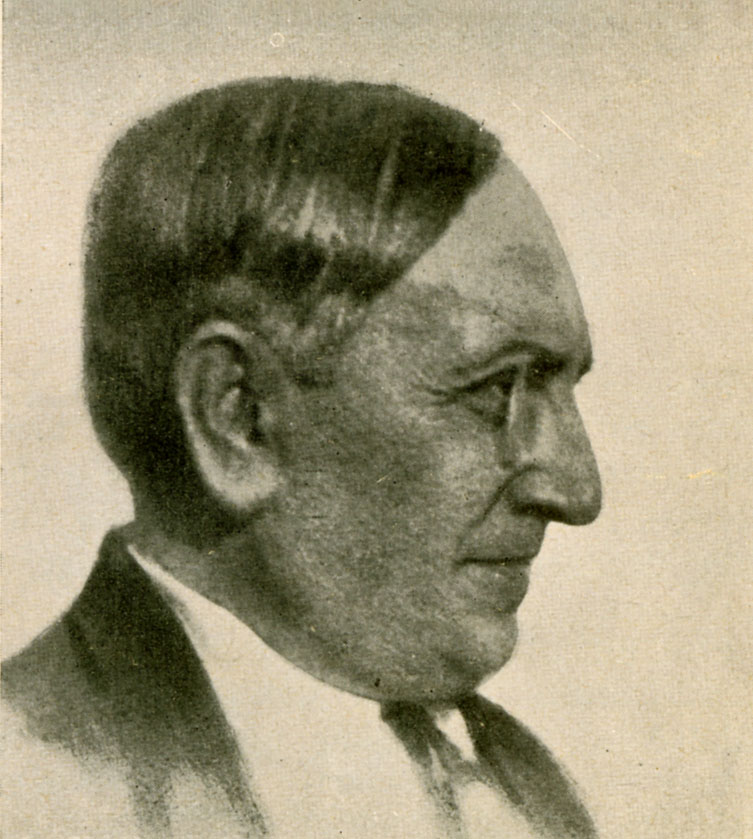
- Born: Renato Eduardo Manganella; 1 November 1880; Rome, Lazio, Italy
- Died: 31 December 1939 (aged 59); Rome, Lazio, Italy
- Occupations: Director; Producer; Screenwriter
- Years active: 1911–1939 (film)

Lucio D'Ambra (1880–1939) was an Italian writer and film director. Born as Renato Manganella, he wrote under the pen name of D'Ambra becoming a celebrated journalist, novelist, and film critic. A noted film enthusiast, D'Ambra became involved in the cinema in 1911 when he anonymously wrote screenplays. From 1916 he formally entered the film industry, setting up his own production company and directing more than twenty films. His silent comedies drew comparisons to the films of his German contemporary Ernst Lubitsch. In 1922 D'Ambra's company was absorbed into the conglomerate Unione Cinematografica Italiana and he retired from regular filmmaking although he occasionally produced further screenplays. In 1937 he published his memoirs, recounting his time working in Italy's early film industry.

== Biography ==
D'Ambra was also a journalist, literary and theater critic, playwright and artistic director of theater companies (Ettore Petrolini reduced his play Ambasciatori to one of his shows) as well as a screenwriter for cinema (he began his career at the time of silent film and then moved on to so-called metacinema and Italian futurism in cinema). Royal Academy of Italy and author of novels (among others, I due modi di avere vent anni, published by Arnoldo Mondadori Editore in 1934, he had the writer and poet Tullio Colsalvatico as his secretary and was on friendly terms with the philosopher and critic Adriano Tilgher (philosopher), with whom he polemicized at length.

He founded in 1919, in collaboration with Piedmontese entrepreneur Alfredo Fasola, his own production company, “D'Ambra-Film,” with which director Ivo Illuminati collaborated, and was the animator of a literary salon that allowed him to come into contact with literati and personalities from the art world (he was friends with writer Arturo Olivieri Sangiacomo, playwright Tito Marrone and Bagutta Prize founder Marino Parenti, among others). In 1923 he founded at the Teatro Eliseo in Rome, together with Mario Fumagalli and Santi Severino, the company called Teatro degli Italiani (which, however, had little luck), whose purpose was to enhance Italian dramaturgy while being able to count on the subsidies promised by the Italian fascism.

His literary activity was extrinsic in a series of novels collected in seven trilogies (of note, the Trilogy of Life in Two comprising The Profession of Husband, The Profession of Wife and The Art of Being Lovers). During the Ventennio he was an ardent supporter of the regime's demographic policy, so much so that he had to declare, “With the white ribbon of cradles, Benito Mussolini friezes the fertile breasts of Italian women who, blessed by God in the glory of motherhood, prepare - spring of children - the Italy of tomorrow.”

Forty or so, on the other hand, are his works as a dramatic author. They include: The Little Red Horse, from 1928; Monte Carlo, from the following year; and Solitude, given to the presses in 1936. The author of essays and fictionalized biographies concerning characters from the world of theater, he is best known for his work as a producer and author of film subjects and Screenplay. He died a few months after the start of World War II. At the invasion of Poland by Nazi Germany he had the following to say: “God spare mad Europe the end of the world!”.

== Selected filmography ==
=== Director ===
- The Illustrious Actress Cicala Formica (1920)

=== Screenwriter ===
- Il bacio di Cirano (1913)
- The Thirteenth Man (1917)
- Nemesis (1920)
- On with the Motley (1920)
- Take Care of Amelia (1925)
- Giuseppe Verdi (1938)
- First Love (1941)

== Bibliography ==
- Marrone, Gaetana. Encyclopedia of Italian Literary Studies: A-J. Taylor & Francis,
- Auro d'Alba (1956). "Mondanità di Giannino Antona Traversi". Formato Tessera. Case Editrice Ceschina. pp. 21–25.
