= Carmine Gallone =

Italian film director (1885–1973)

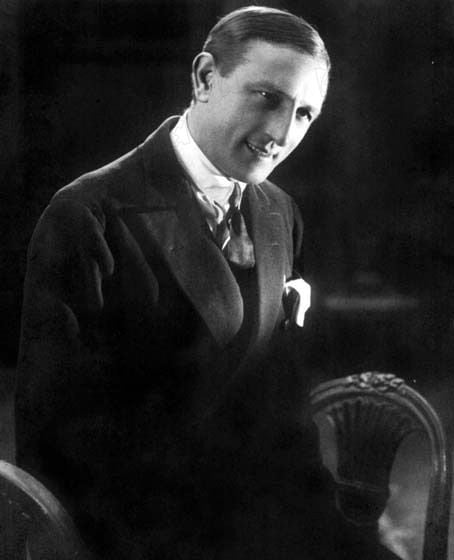
- Carmine Gallone in the 1930s
- Born: Carmelo Camillo Gallone; 10 September 1885; Taggia, Liguria, Kingdom of Italy
- Died: 11 March 1973 (aged 87); Frascati, Lazio, Italy
- Occupations: Film director; screenwriter
- Spouse: Soava Gallone (m. 1911; died 1957)
- Relatives: Giuseppe Varni (brother-in-law)

Signature
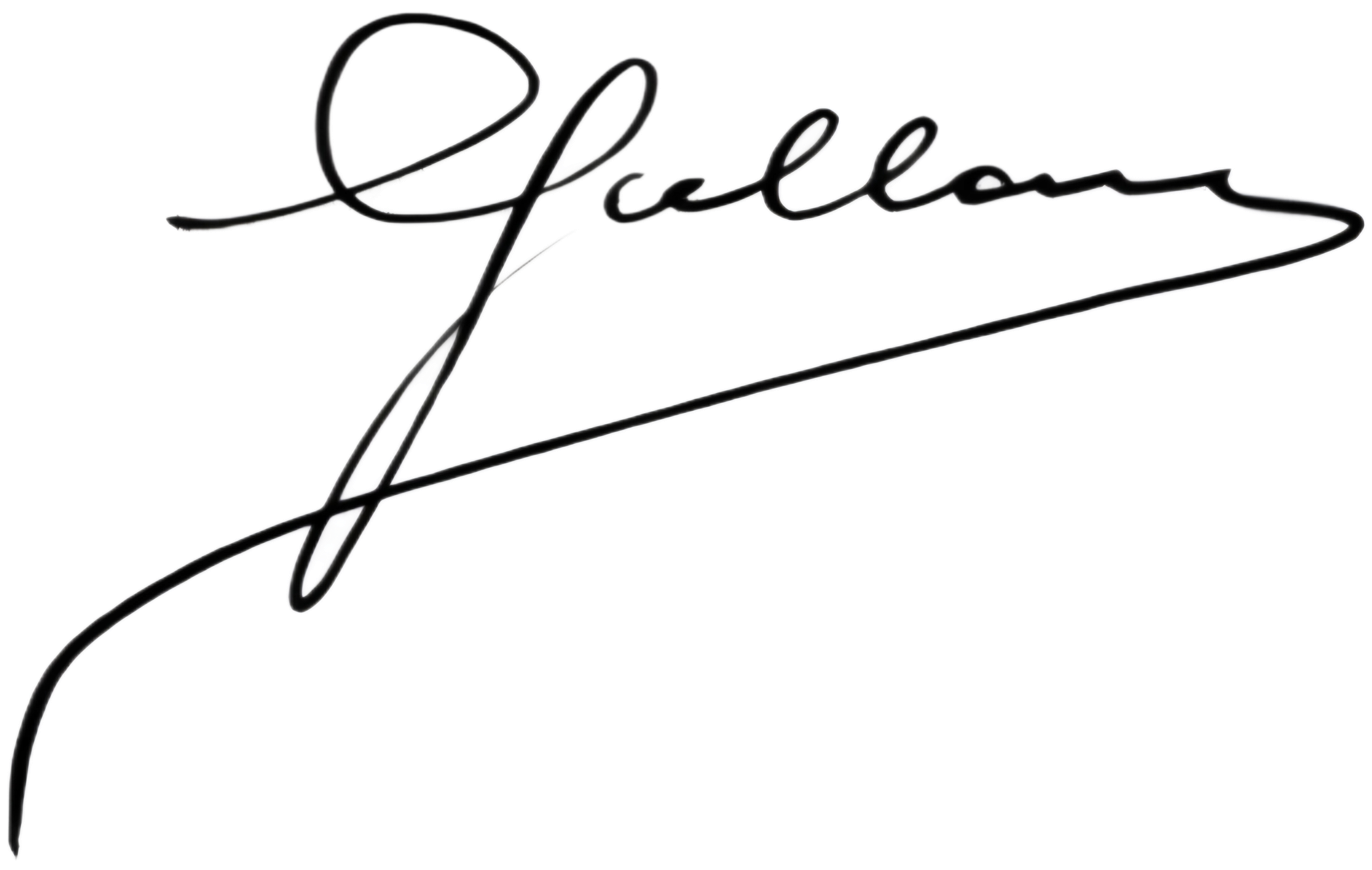

Carmine Gallone (10 September 1885 – 11 March 1973) was an early Italian film director, screenwriter, and film producer, who was also controversial for his works of pro-Fascist propaganda and historical revisionism. Considered one of Italian cinema's leading early directors, he directed over 120 films in his fifty-year career between 1913 and 1963. Due to his predilection for historical epics he has been compared to Cecil B. DeMille.

== Life and career ==
=== Early life and career ===
Carmine Gallone was born as Carmelo Camillo Gallone on 10 September 1885 in Taggia (in the province of Imperia), but grew up in Naples. His father, Pasquale Gallone, was Italian, from Sorrento, and his mother, Rosa Langery, was French, from Nice. He began writing plays at the age of 15 and, in 1911, he travelled to Rome to participate in the National Drama Competition organised to celebrate the fiftieth anniversary of the Unification of Italy. Although the play he submitted, Il Britannico, did not win, it received an honourable mention from the examining committee.

That same year, he married Stanisława Winawerówna, a Polish actress born in Warsaw in 1880. He was hired by the resident acting company of the Teatro Argentina, where he remained with his wife until the end of 1912. During this period, he also worked as a film critic for several Roman magazines. In 1913, the young film director Nino Oxilia introduced him to Cines, where he made his debut as a screenwriter, adapting several comedies by Henry Bataille. At the end of the year, the Chief Executive Officer of Cines, Alberto Fassini, entrusted him with directing the drama film The Naked Truth, based on Bataille's play of the same name and starring Lyda Borelli.

=== Early successes ===
Gallone directed thirteen films for Cines in 1914 alone, including Amore senza veli, Il romanzo di un torero and Le campane di Sorrento. In 1915, he was chosen to direct Avatar, and in 1917, he directed Malombra, a loose adaptation of Fogazzaro's novel of the same name. Gallone's early films are characterised by a refined aesthetic sensibility influenced by the Decadent movement prevalent at the time. He carefully constructed each image, studying the relationship between lighting and composition to create original visual effects.

At the outbreak World War I, Gallone was filming Cuor di neve, starring Leda Gys. He was drafted into the army at the end of 1915, serving in the 1st Regiment "Granatieri di Sardegna", before being called up by the Ministry of the Navy in 1916 to direct propaganda films. Meanwhile, he began a collaboration with the novelist, screenwriter and director Lucio D'Ambra, a key figure in the development of sophisticated silent comedy in Italy. D'Ambra and Gallone collaborated on several films, including: La chiamavano Cosetta, Storia dei tredici (1917), On with the Motley (1919), Il bacio di Cirano, a reimagining of Edmond Rostand's Cyrano de Bergerac. In 1919, Gallone made his most successful film to date: the historical epic Redenzione (Redemption), produced by the Medusa Film company. Starring Diana Karenne, the film stood out from other historical films of the same period thanks to its elegant and sophisticated cinematography, and was a great success with both audiences and critics.

While Italian cinema was experiencing a period of crisis and a decline in production, Gallone continued to make successful films characterised by lavish sets and high production quality. These included the dark, sentimental drama Through the Shadows (1924); the melodrama The Faces of Love (1924), based on the opera Adriana Lecouvreur by Eugène Scribe and Ernest Legouvé; and La signorina madre di famiglia (1925). In 1925, he directed The Fiery Cavalcade, a love story set against the backdrop of Garibaldi's Expedition of the Thousand. Starring Gallone's wife, Emilio Ghione, and Jeanne Brindeau, the film drew parallels between the Garibaldian and Fascist movements, a comparison that would later be endorsed by the fascist regime.

In 1926, Gallone directed the historical epic The Last Days of Pompeii, based on E. G. Bulwer-Lytton's novel. A spectacular production with thousand of extras and an international cast, the film is notable for featuring scenes colorized by the Pathéchrome stencil color process. Despite its grand scale, the film was a commercial disappointment, particularly when compared to earlier versions. It was a major setback for Italian cinema and marked the end to the first part of Gallone's career as a filmmaker.

=== The crisis of Italian cinema ===
Poster for Gallone's Die Stadt der Tausend Freuden (The City of a Thousand Delights)

In 1927, Gallone left Italy to work in France, Germany, England and Austria. While in Paris, he directed Celle qui domine for the British film company Gaumont-British. That same year Gallone moved to Berlin, where he directed the drama film The City of a Thousand Delights, starring Paul Richter, Adele Sandrock and Langhorn Burton. His next movie, Pawns of Passion, shot in Germany and Poland in 1928, was an explicit anti-Soviet and anti-communist propaganda film. In 1929, Gallone shot his first sound film, Land Without Women, stylistically one of his best works. The movie was shot at the Staaken and Templehof Studios in Berlin with sets designed by the art directors Hans Sohnle and Otto Erdmann. After returning to Paris, he directed Un soir de rafle (1931). Lively, engaging, sentimental, and funny, it was considered one of the greatest successes of French sound film.

In 1933, Gallone moved to London to realize English-language versions of some of his films. In 1934, he filmed Lucean le stelle in Berlin, for which he made French and English versions. The following year he directed the musical drama film Casta Diva. Written by Hollywood screenwriter Walter Reisch and starring Marta Eggerth, Lamberto Picasso and Gualtiero Tumiati, the film was a fictionalized biography of Vincenzo Bellini. It was filmed at the Cines studios in Rome and won the Mussolini Cup at the 1935 Venice International Film Festival. Gallone simultaneously shot an English-language version of the film, The Divine Spark, starring Marta Eggerth, Phillips Holmes, Benita Hume, and Donald Calthrop.

=== The Fascist period ===
In 1937, Gallone was commissioned to direct Scipio Africanus, a historical epic widely regarded as the most significant cinematic propaganda effort of the Italian Fascist regime. The film was intended to celebrate the victorious conclusion of the Second Italo-Ethiopian War and to serve as a metaphor for the regime's imperial project. It received heavy financial backing from Italian government and was overseen by Mussolini's son, Vittorio. Although the film failed to impress Mussolini, it still premiered at the Venice Film Festival and was quite successful.

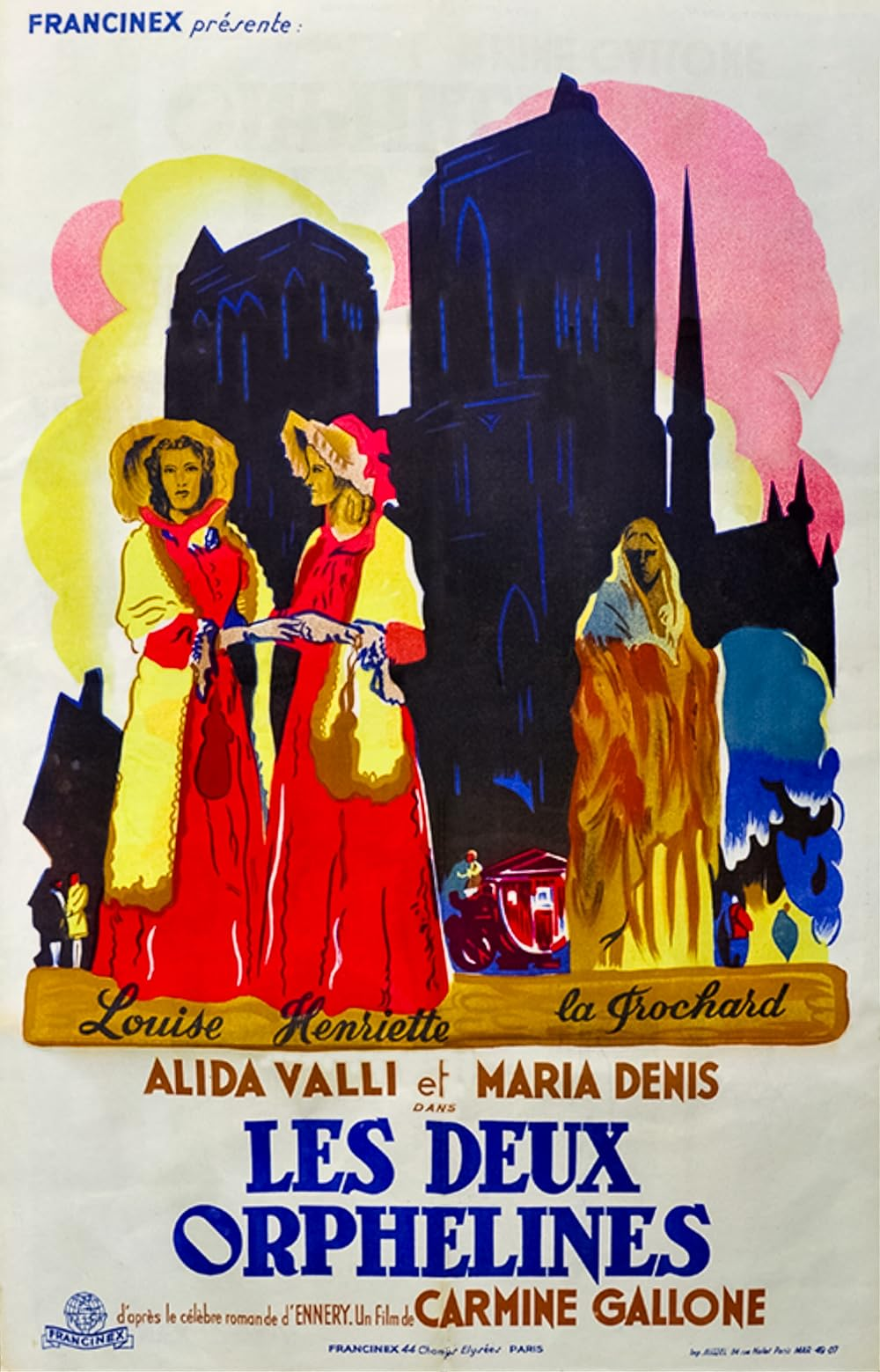
Poster to the French theatrical release of Gallone's The Two Orphans, 1942

Following the revival of the Italian film industry, Gallone settled permanently in Italy. In the late 1930s he directed several films inspired by the world of opera, most notably Giuseppe Verdi (1938), Marionette (1939), Il sogno di Butterfly, (1939) and Amami Alfredo (1940). In 1940 he directed The Two Orphans, a remake of D. W. Griffith's Orphans of the Storm, starring Alida Valli and Maria Denis; In Eternal Melodies, starring Gino Cervi and the Spanish actress Conchita Montenegro, Gallone recounts the precocious debut, unhappy love affairs and premature death of Wolfgang Amadeus Mozart, skilfully blending elements of opera with exquisitely dramatic scenes. The Secret Lover (1941) is remembered for Valli's provocative performance. Odessa in Flames (1942), a propaganda war film set in the Soviet Union, was the first result of a collaboration agreement between Italian and Romanian filmmakers. In 1943 Gallone directed Harlem, set in the US and critical about the American lifestyle, with afro-American and colonial British war prisoners employed in extra roles as colored characters. Despite its setting in a stilted New York lifted directly from contemporary American films, the film stood out for its memorable sequences.

=== Post-war period ===
Following the collapse of the Italian Social Republic, Gallone, one of the foremost figures in fascist cinema, was handed a six-month suspension by the Italian authorities. Between 1946 and 1947, he directed five film adaptations of operas, including the box-office hit Rigoletto and Davanti a lui tremava tutta Roma, starring Anna Magnani. These were followed by: Addio Mimì! (1948); The Lady of the Camellias (1949); Puccini (1952), which was also number one at the box office; The Legend of Faust (1953); Aida and Cavalleria rusticana (1954).

When interest in operatic films waned, Gallone returned to historical epics, with Messalina (1951) and especially Carthage in Flames (1960), one of the most expensive epic adventure films produced in Italy during the 1960s. In 1955, he directed some comic films in the Don Camillo series, starring Fernandel and Gino Cervi. The 1962 comedy Carmen di Trastevere was the last film of his long career. Gallone died in Frascati on 11 March 1973 following a heart attack. Having directed over one hundred films, he is recognised as one of the most prolific filmmakers in the history of Italian cinema.

== Selected filmography ==
=== Silent films ===
Year	Title	Preservation status
1913	Il bacio di Cirano	Lost
1915	The Naked Truth	Cineteca di Bologna and Cinémathèque Française
1915	Senza colpa!	Lost
1915	Flower of Evil	Public domain; Cineteca di Bologna and EYE Film Institute Netherlands
1915	The Wedding March	Cineteca di Bologna
1915	Sotto le tombe	Lost
1916	Avatar	Lost
1916	La falena	Public domain; Fondazione Cineteca Italiana
1917	Malombra	Public domain; Cineteca di Bologna
1917	The Thirteenth Man	Lost
1918	La storia di un peccato	Lost
1919	Redemption	Lost
1919	A Doll Wife	BFI National Archive, Archives françaises du film and Cineteca di Bologna
1919	The Sea of Naples	Lost
1920	On with the Motley	Lost
1920	Nemesis	Lost
1921	All'ombra di un trono	Czech Film Archive and Museo del Cine Pablo Ducrós Hicken
1924	The Faces of Love	Lost
1925	The Fiery Cavalcade	Swiss Film Archive and Cineteca di Bologna
1926	The Last Days of Pompeii	Cineteca di Bologna, National Museum of Cinema and British Film Institute
1927	The City of a Thousand Delights	Lost
1928	Pawns of Passion	Lost
1929	Ship in Distress	Lost

Sound films

Year	Title	Notes
1929	Land Without Women	First full-length German-speaking sound film to be released.
1930	The Singing City	An English-language version was released in 1930 under the title City of Song (1931).
1931	My Cousin from Warsaw	A separate German-language version was also made, directed by Carl Boese
1932	A Son from America	Remake of the 1924 silent film of the same name.
1932	Sailor's Song	
1933	Going Gay	Followed by a sequel For Love of You, also released the same year.
1934	My Heart Calls You	Separate English-language (My Heart Is Calling) and French-language versions (Mon cœur t'appelle) were made, both also directed by Gallone.
1934	Two Hearts in Waltz Time	Remake of a 1930 German film of the same name.
1935	Casta Diva	An English-language version The Divine Spark was made at the same time, also directed by Gallone and starring Eggerth.
1935	If It Were Not for Music	
1936	Thank You, Madame	Also known by the alternative title In the Sunshine
1937	Mother Song	
1937	Scipio Africanus: The Defeat of Hannibal	
1938	Giuseppe Verdi	Also known by the alternative title The Life of Giuseppe Verdi
1939	Marionette	A separate German version Dir gehört mein Herz was also made
1939	The Dream of Butterfly	A co-production between Italy and Germany, two separate versions were produced in the respective languages
1940	Eternal Melodies	
1940	Manon Lescaut	
1940	Love Me, Alfredo!	
1940	Beyond Love	
1941	The Secret Lover	
1941	First Love	
1942	The Two Orphans	Remake of D. W. Griffith's Orphans of the Storm
1942	The Queen of Navarre	
1942	Odessa in Flames	Location shooting took place in Axis-occupied Odessa and Moldova as well as Romania.
1943	Sad Loves	
1943	Harlem	also known by the alternative title of Knock Out
1945	The Song of Life	
1946	Biraghin	
1946	Before Him All Rome Trembled	
1947	The Lady of the Camellias	Released in America by Columbia Pictures under the title The Lost One
1949	The Legend of Faust	
1950	The Force of Destiny	
1950	Night Taxi	
1951	Messalina	
1952	Puccini	
1952	We're Dancing on the Rainbow	
1953	Fatal Desire	
1954	Madame Butterfly	
1954	House of Ricordi	
1954	Casta Diva	
1954	Mata Hari's Daughter	
1955	Don Camillo's Last Round	
1954	Michel Strogoff	
1954	Tosca	
1959	Carthage in Flames	
1961	Don Camillo: Monsignor	
1962	Carmen di Trastevere	
1962	La monaca di Monza	

== Bibliography ==
- Iaccio, Pasquale; Calabretto, Roberto (2003). Non solo Scipione: il cinema di Carmine Gallone. Naples: Liguori. ISBN 9788820733131.
- Hughes, Howard (2011). Cinema Italiano. The Complete Guide From Classics To Cult. London-New York: I.B.Tauris. ISBN 978-1-84885-608-0.
