= The Wedding March =

The Wedding March may refer to:

- "Wedding March" (Mendelssohn), an 1842 composition by Felix Mendelssohn from his incidental music for A Midsummer Night's Dream
- The Wedding March, an 1873 play by W. S. Gilbert, later adapted as the comic opera Haste to the Wedding
- The Wedding March (1915 film), an Italian silent film directed by Carmine Gallone
- The Wedding March (1928 film), an American silent film directed by Erich von Stroheim
- The Wedding March (1929 film), a French silent film directed by André Hugon
- The Wedding March (1934 film), an Italian comedy film
- The Wedding March (film series), a 2016–2019 American-Canadian romantic film series

== See also ==
- "Bridal Chorus", from the 1850 opera Lohengrin by Richard Wagner, frequently used as a wedding march
- Wedding music
