= Madame Guillotine (1916 film) =

- Directed by: Enrico Guazzoni; Mario Caserini
- Written by: Victorien Sardou (play); Enrico Guazzoni
- Starring: Lyda Borelli; Renzo Fabiani; Amleto Novelli
- Cinematography: Gabriele Gabrielian
- Production company: Palatino Film
- Release date: November 1916
- Country: Italy
- Languages: Silent; Italian intertitles

Madame Guillotine (Italian: Madame Tallien) is a 1916 Italian historical film directed by Mario Caserini and Enrico Guazzoni and starring Lyda Borelli, Renzo Fabiani and Amleto Novelli. It is based on a play by Victorien Sardou set during the French Revolution.

== Cast ==
- Lyda Borelli as Madame Tallien
- Renzo Fabiani as Robespierre
- Amleto Novelli as Tallien
- Ettore Baccani as Fontenay
- Ruggero Barni as Guery
- Orlando Ricci
- Roberto Spiombi

== Bibliography ==
- Redi, Riccardo. Cinema muto italiano: 1896-1930. Fondazione Scuola nazionale di cinema, 1999.
