= The Revolt of the Slaves =

- Directed by: Nunzio Malasomma
- Screenplay by: Stefano Srucchi; Duccio Tessari
- Based on: Fabiola; 1854 novel by Nicholas Patrick Wiseman
- Produced by: Paolo Moffa
- Starring: Rhonda Fleming; Lang Jeffries; Darío Moreno
- Cinematography: Cecilio Paniagua
- Edited by: Eraldo Da Roma
- Music by: Angelo Francesco Lavagnino
- Production companies: Ambrosiana Cinematografica; C.B. Films S.A; Ultra Film
- Distributed by: United Artists
- Release dates: 20 December 1960 (Italy); 17 March 1961 (West Germany)
- Running time: 100 minutes
- Countries: Italy; Spain; West Germany
- Languages: Italian; German

The Revolt of the Slaves (Italian: La rivolta degli schiavi) is a 1960 Italian adventure film directed by Nunzio Malasomma. It is based on the 1854 novel Fabiola by Nicholas Wiseman.

== Cast ==
- Rhonda Fleming: Claudia
- Lang Jeffries: Vibio
- Darío Moreno: Massimiano
- Ettore Manni: Sebastiano
- Wandisa Guida: Agnese
- Gino Cervi: Claudio
- Fernando Rey: Valerio
- Serge Gainsbourg: Corvino
- José Nieto: Sesto, servitore di Claudia
- Rainer Penkert: Massimo
- Antonio Casas: Tertulio
- Dolores Francine: Liubaia

== Release ==
The Revolt of the Slaves was released in Italy on 20 December 1960 with a 100-minute running time and in the United States with a 102-minute running time in June 1961. It was released in West Germany as Die Sklaven Roms on 17 March 1961.

== See also ==
- List of Italian films of 1960
