= Callista (novel) =

1855 novel by John Henry Newman

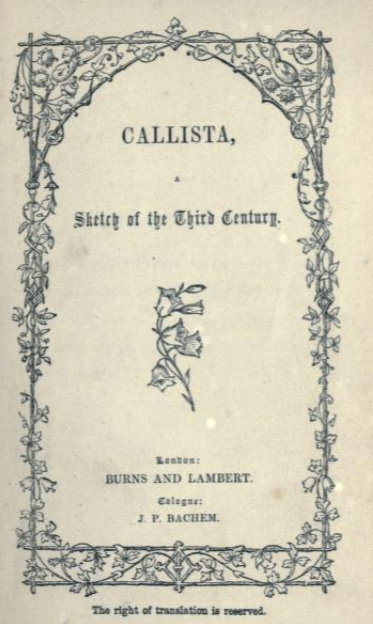
- Title page for Callista (1855)
- Author: John Henry Newman
- Language: English
- Genre: Fiction
- Published: 1855
- Publication place: England

Callista is a novel by the English Catholic theologian, priest and writer St John Henry Newman. It was first published in 1855.

== Plot summary ==
Callista is set in the mid-3rd century in the city of Sicca Veneria in the Roman province of Africa. It deals with the persecution of the Christian community under Emperor Decius.

The main character of the novel is Callista, a young and beautiful Greek girl who has arrived from Greece some years previously with her brother Aristo; they work for Agellius's uncle, Jucundus, carving statues of pagan gods. She is a gifted young woman, yet she is unhappy with her life.

Another main character is the troubled young Christian Agellius, who wants to marry Callista. He is torn between his faith and his brother (Juba), his stepmother Gurta, a pagan witch, and his pagan uncle Jucundus, who all want to bring him away from the Christian faith. Agellius soon meets the mysterious Christian priest Caecilius (later identified as St. Cyprian of Carthage), who becomes a father figure for him and strengthens his faith again.

After a terrible plague of locusts, popular rage against Christians breaks out and persecution starts once again. Agellius has to flee from the surroundings of Sicca Veneria. At the same time, Callista sees herself drawn more and more strongly to Christianity. When she is compelled to offer incense to the pagan gods, she has to make a dramatic choice, which finally leads her into the Catholic Church and then to martyrdom.

== Background ==
The novel was commissioned as a sort of "prequel" to Fabiola by Cardinal Nicholas Wiseman, published a year earlier. It draws both from the parallels between ancient Roman society and the still lingering persecution of and prejudices against Roman Catholics in the Britain of the time and from Newman's own experiences as a convert. The novel also deals with questions of integrity and determination, even in the face of death. Most of its characters are at the same time ambiguous and troubled ones, who have to make a choice for or against the Christian faith in the course of the story.
