= Ivan the Terrible (1917 film) =

- Directed by: Enrico Guazzoni
- Music by: Benedetto Cerrato
- Production company: Società Italiana Cines
- Distributed by: Società Italiana Cines
- Release date: August 1917
- Country: Italy
- Languages: Silent; Italian intertitles

Ivan the Terrible (Italian: Ivan, il terribile) is a 1917 Italian historical film directed by Enrico Guazzoni and starring Lina Dax, Matilde Di Marzio and Angelo Gallina. It portrays the life of the Russian tsar Ivan the Terrible.

== Plot ==
Tsar Ivan fathers a child by the wife of the boyar Athanasius Romanov. Twenty years later, a revenge-fueled Ivan turns against the boyars, and orders his soldiers to destroy their villages and slaughter their inhabitants. During an orgy that follows, he attempts to rape a young woman named Elena, only for the elderly Romanov to reveal to him that Elena is Ivan's daughter.

Vladimir, Elena’s fiancé, plots to kill the Tsar while disguised as a monk, but Elena stops him. Plagued by remorse, an elderly Ivan dies.

== Cast ==
- Lina Dax
- Matilde Di Marzio
- Angelo Gallina
- Andrea Habay
- Amleto Novelli

== Production ==
Ivan the Terrible was finished in 1915, but was initially rejected by the Italian censors. Eventually, the censors decided to allow it on the condition that the title be changed to "Il principe crudele" (The Cruel Prince), but the studio Società Italiana Cines rejected the requirement. After a second committee review, the film was approved, so long as the word "bacchanal" was cut from all the intertitles.

== Reception ==
Giuseppe Lega in La cine-fono called the film "beautiful and magnificent", but said it fell short of the marketing material, and that for all its technical mastery the film failed to be a real innovation in film production. He praised Novelli's performance of the eponymous Tsar, calling him an "artist of profound dramatic integrity" and that he "achieved remarkably clear effects of broad and varied expressiveness", while the other actors were not much more than "adequate".

Pier da Costello, writing for La vita cinematografica, was much harsher. "The frames—there is no denying it—are beautiful and magnificently conceived," he wrote; "it is just a pity that the actors move within them...in this Cines film, if you set aside one or two actors, the rest look like people who have never set foot on a film set, except perhaps as extras."

== Bibliography ==
- Redi, Riccardo. Cinema muto italiano: 1896-1930. Fondazione Scuola nazionale di cinema, 1999.
