= Fabiola (1918 film) =

- Directed by: Enrico Guazzoni
- Written by: Fausto Salvatori
- Based on: Fabiola by Nicholas Patrick Wiseman
- Starring: Augusto Mastripietri; Amleto Novelli; Elena Sangro; Livio Pavanelli
- Cinematography: Alfredo Lenci
- Music by: Alexander Henneman
- Production company: Palatino Film
- Release date: 25 March 1918
- Running time: 85 minutes
- Country: Italy
- Languages: Silent; Italian intertitles

Fabiola is a 1918 Italian silent historical film directed by Enrico Guazzoni and starring Augusto Mastripietri, Amleto Novelli and Elena Sangro. It is an adaptation of the 1854 novel Fabiola by Nicholas Patrick Wiseman about the rise of Christianity in the Roman Empire. It was one of a series of historical epics for which the Italian film industry became famous during the era. The novel was later turned into a sound film of the same name in 1949.

== Cast ==
- Augusto Mastripietri: Eurota
- Amleto Novelli: Fulvio
- Elena Sangro: Fabiola
- Livio Pavanelli: San Sebastiano
- Giulia Cassini-Rizzotto: Lucia
- Bruno Castellani: Quadrato
- Valeria Sanfilippo: Santa Cecilia
- Signora Poletti: Sant' Agnese
- Signora Tirelli: Afra

== Bibliography ==
- Sorlin, Pierre (1996). Italian National Cinema 1896-1996. London: Routledge. ISBN 978-0415116985.
