= Fabiola (novel) =

1854 novel by Cardinal Nicholas Wiseman

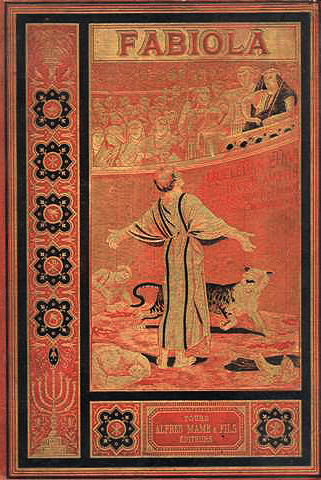
- Fabiola, French 1893 edition
- Author: Cardinal Nicholas Patrick Wiseman
- Language: English
- Genre: Historical/Religious Fiction
- Publication date: 1854
- Publication place: England
- Pages: 616

Fabiola or, the Church of the Catacombs is a novel by the English Cardinal Nicholas Wiseman. It was first published in 1854. The novel has been adapted to film three times.

== Plot summary ==
The story is set in the early 4th century AD, Rome, during the time of the persecution of Christians under the Roman emperor Diocletian.

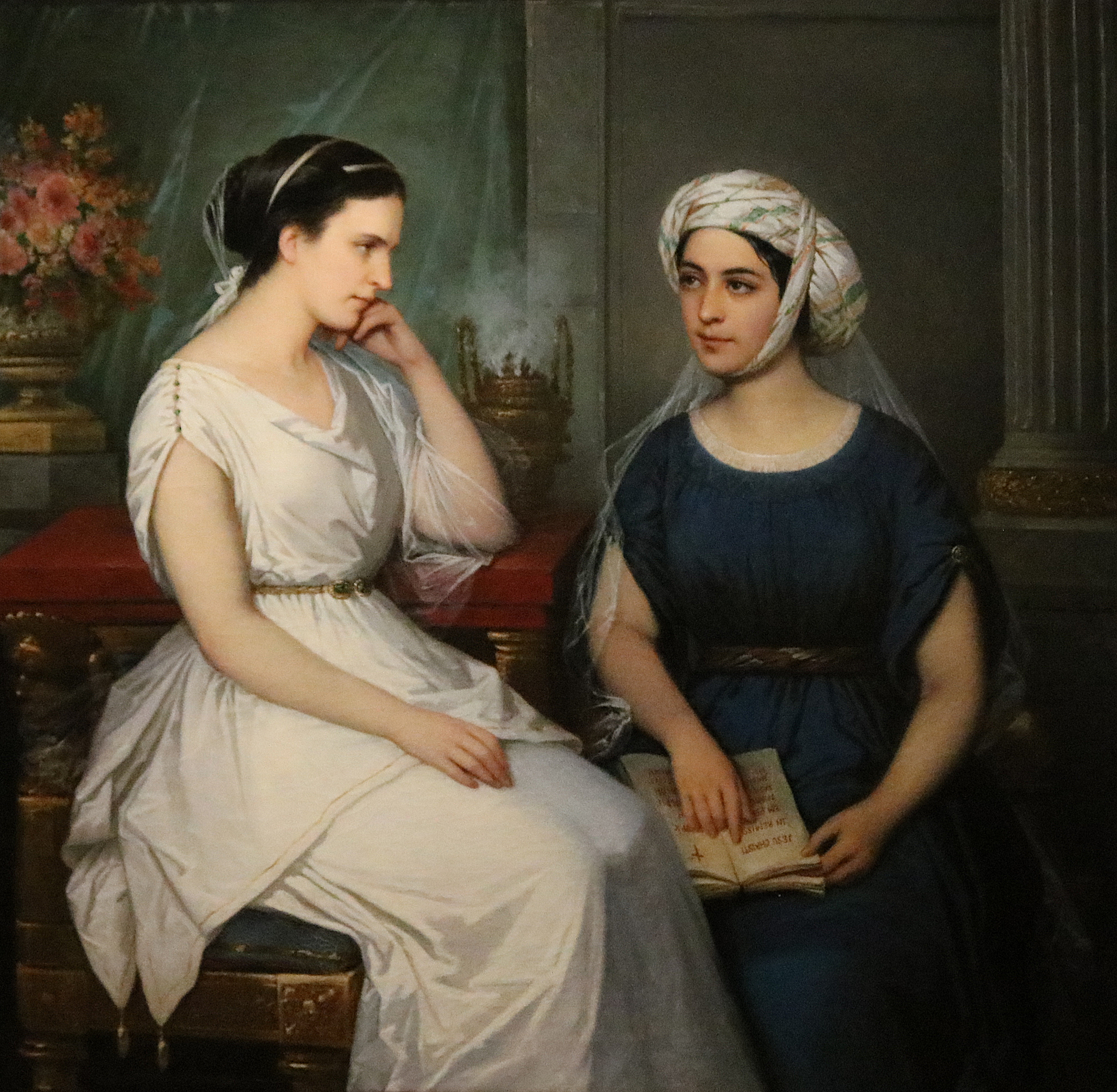
Amanda Fougère, Fabiola and Syra, 1859, painting inspired by Wiseman's novel

The heroine of the book is Fabiola, a young beauty from a noble Roman family. She is spoiled by her father Fabius, who cannot deny her anything. Fabiola seems to have everything, including a superior education in the philosophers, yet under the surface, she is not content with her life. One day, in a fit of rage, she attacks and wounds her slave girl Syra, who is a secret Christian. The proud, spoiled Roman girl is humbled by Syra's humility, maturity and devotion to her in this situation, and a slow transformation begins, which finally culminates in her conversion to Christianity, brought on by Syra and of her own cousin Agnes, whom she adores and dotes on.

Another thread of the story deals with the young boy Pancratius, a pious Christian and son of a martyr, who is himself preparing for martyrdom. Pancratius' nemesis is Corvinus, a bullying schoolmate who is irritated by the young Christian's saintliness. He does everything to bring him and the Christian community of the catacombs of Rome down. This includes the orchestrating of the lynching of their former teacher Cassianus, who is secretly Christian. Yet Pancratius shows his enemy the meaning of Christian forgiveness when he saves his life shortly after Corvinus had Cassianus killed.

Another major villain in the story is the enigmatic Fulvius, an apparently rich young man from the East who soon reveals himself to be a hunter of Christians who turns them in to the authorities for money. His aim on the one hand is to gain the hand of either Fabiola or Agnes, and on the other hand, to uproot the Christian community in Rome. After some dramatic events that reveal his surprising connections to Syra, who is his long-lost younger sister Myriam, Fulvius rejects his evil ways, converts to Christianity and becomes a hermit.

== Characters ==
The story also weaves a number of martyrdom accounts and legends of real-life Christian saints into the fictitious story. These include Saint Agnes, Saint Sebastian, Saint Pancras (Pancratius), Saint Cassian (Cassianus), Saint Emerentiana, and Saint Tarcisius. Two exceptions are the characters of Fabiola and of the blind beggar girl Caecilia, Syra's friend and fellow Christian; though they do bear saints' names, are not identical with Saint Fabiola (who lived later) and Saint Cecilia (whose legend is very different from Caecilia's story in the novel).

== Background ==
Wiseman wrote Fabiola in part as an answer to the book Hypatia, written by the Anglican Charles Kingsley. The novel was mainly aimed at the embattled Catholic minority in England, who had recently emerged from a half-illegal status (the Catholic hierarchy in England had been re-established only in 1850).

The story thus constantly stresses the close-knit community of the early Christians, their love for each other, their solidarity, and their strong sense of communion. At the same time, direct references to the present situation of Catholics in England are relatively rare, especially when compared to John Henry Newman's Callista (1855), which was commissioned as a sort of "prequel" to Fabiola. Still, the heroic language in which the tales of the martyrs are told obviously aims at strengthening the courage and determination of Catholics in England. The educational side of the book is also important: several chapters digress on historical information about worship and burial in the catacombs. However the novel followed the understanding of contemporary historians and greatly exaggerated the role the catacombs played in Early Christian life.

A film version was produced in 1918 in Italy directed by Enrico Guazzoni. Also, a lavish Franco-Italian film version was released in 1949. (It reached the USA only in 1951 in a dubbed and drastically cut version.) The second film bears little resemblance to its ostensible source. A third "peplum" film version called La Rivolta degli schiavi was produced in 1960. It takes more elements from the novel than the second, such as including both St. Agnes and St. Sebastian, but strays from the novel in many ways.
