= Tarcisius =

Martyr of the early Christian church

Saint Tarcisius
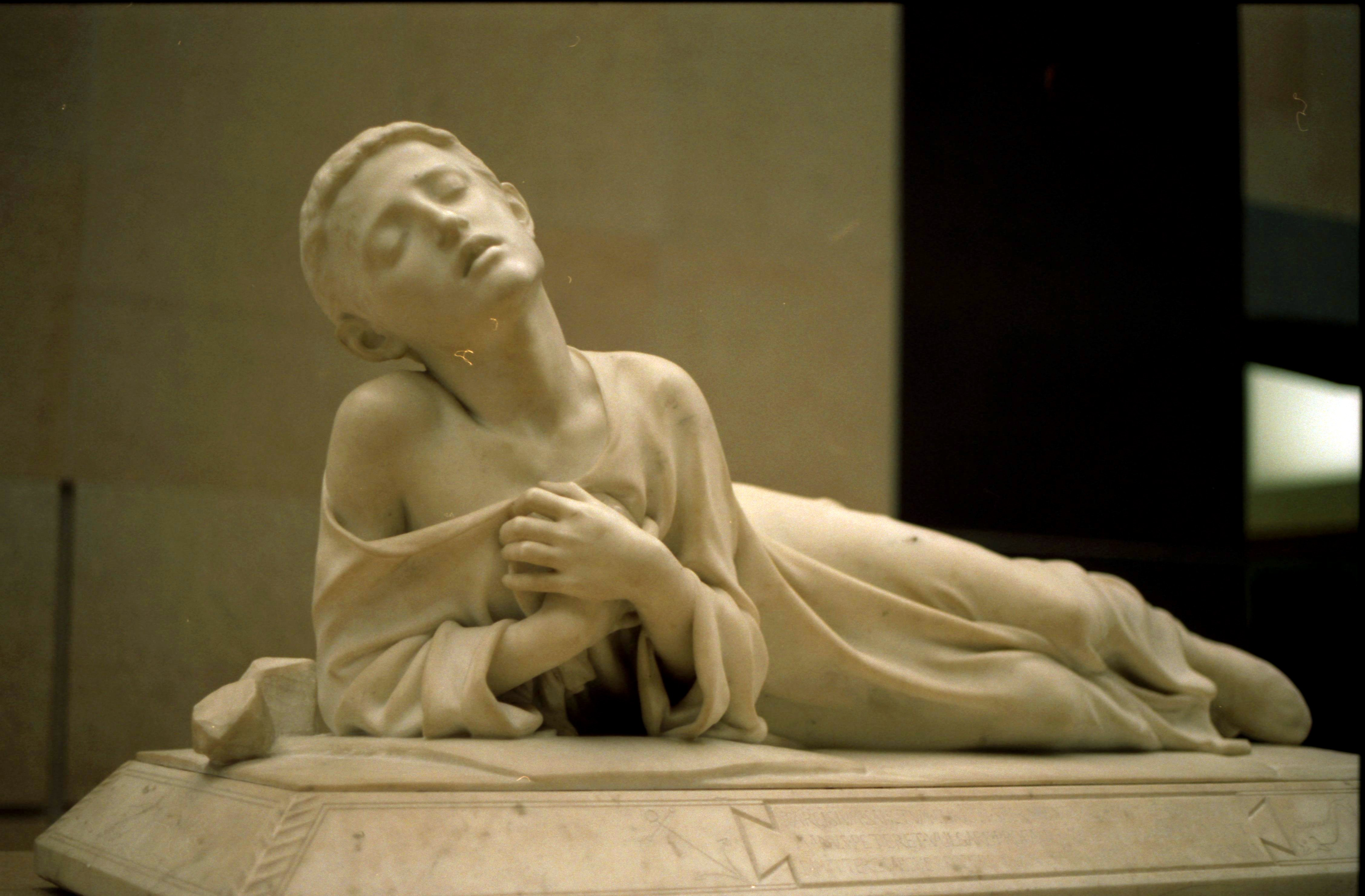
- Alexandre Falguière, Tarcisius, Christian martyr, 1868, musée d'Orsay.

Martyr
- Died: 3rd Century; Rome
- Venerated in: Catholic Church; Eastern Orthodox Church; Anglicanism; Lutheranism
- Canonized: Pre-Congregation
- Major shrine: San Silvestro in Capite, Rome
- Feast: August 15 (Roman Martyrology), and additionally universally in the Orthodox Church on August 14
- Attributes: Host, youth, wounds
- Patronage: altar servers and first communicants

Tarsicius or Tarcisius was a martyr of the early Christian church who lived in the 3rd century. The little that is known about him comes from a metrical inscription by Pope Damasus I, who was pope in the second half of the 4th century.

== History ==
The only positive information concerning this Roman martyr is found in a poem composed in his honour by Pope Damasus (366–384), who compares him to the deacon Saint Stephen and says that, as Stephen was stoned by a crowd, so Tarcisius, carrying the Blessed Sacrament, was attacked by a group and beaten to death.

Nothing else definite is known concerning Tarcisius. Since Damasus compares him to Stephen, he may have been a deacon; however, a 6th-century account makes him an acolyte. According to one version of the detailed legend that developed later, Tarcisius was a young boy during one of the fierce 3rd-century Roman persecutions, probably during the reign of Emperor Valerian (253–259). One day, he was entrusted with the task of bringing the Eucharist to condemned Christians in prison. He preferred death at the hands of a mob rather than deliver to them the Blessed Sacrament which he was carrying.

== Veneration ==
He was originally buried in the Catacombs of San Callisto and the inscription by Damasus was placed later on his tomb. Some time later his relics were moved to the San Silvestro in Capite church in Rome; however, excavations to find his relics were fruitless. The relics are currently located in the Chapel of the Guardian Angel in the Church of San Domenico Maggiore in Naples, having been transferred there in 1646. A relic of the saint is also kept in the chapel of the Salesian Institute of Saint Tarcisius in Rome. His feast day is celebrated on 15 August; which is the solemnity of the Assumption of Mary. Therefore, his memorial is not included in the General Roman Calendar, but he is listed in the Roman Martyrology.

== Patronage ==
He is the patron saint of altar servers and first communicants.

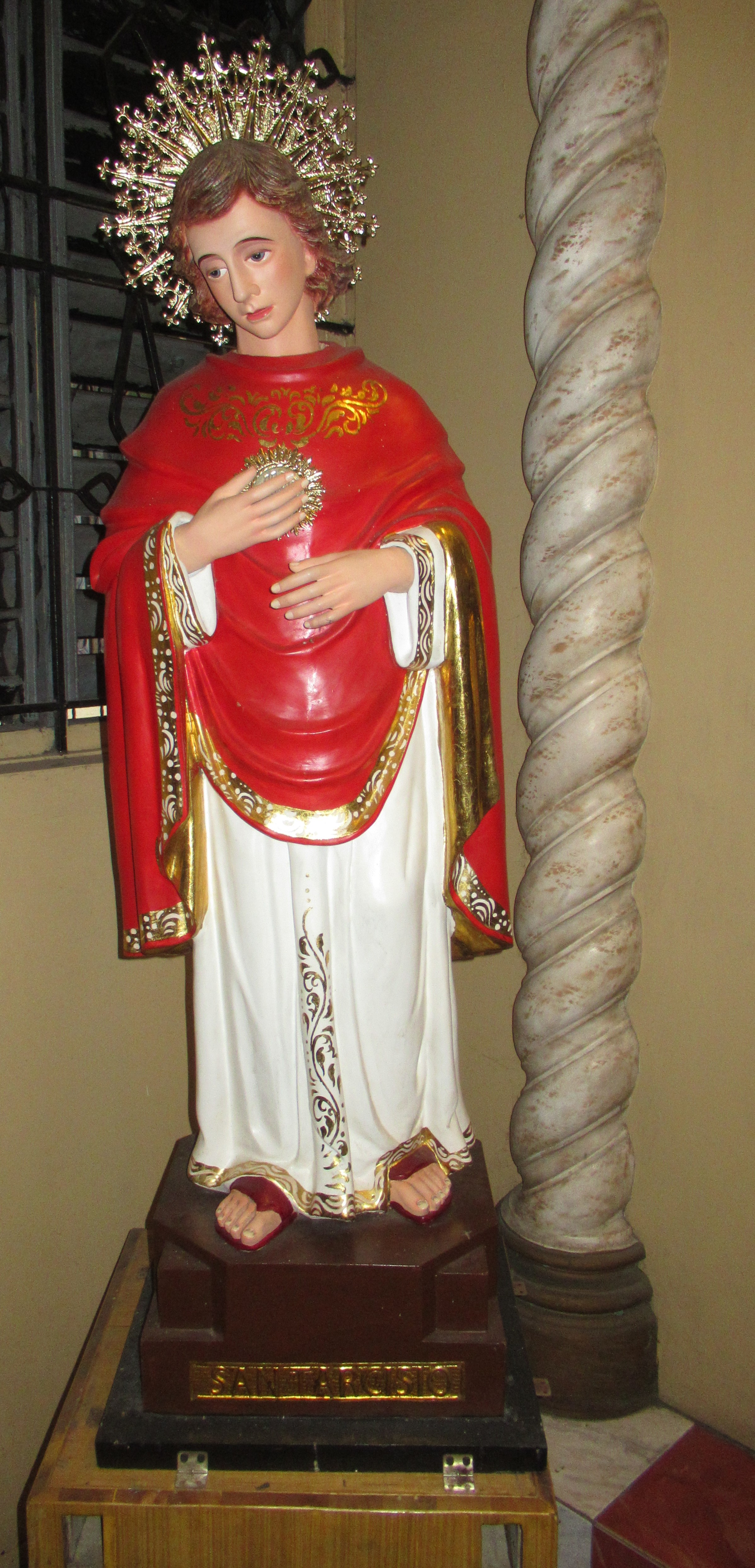
Saint Tarcisius, Philippines

== Legacy ==
His story was greatly expanded by Cardinal Nicholas Wiseman, who portrays him as a young acolyte in his novel Fabiola, or the Church in the Catacombs.

The municipality of Saint-Tharcisius in Quebec, Canada, is named after him, as well as a 35 kilogram (77 lb) bell in the Stephansdom in Vienna, Austria.

A Catholic church on London Road, Camberley, England, is dedicated to St Tarcisius.

The St. Tarcisius parish in Framingham, Massachusetts was founded in 1907 by Father Pietro Maschi.

The St. Tarcissus parish in Chicago, Illinois, was established in 1926, with St. Tarcissus Church dedicated in 1954. The parish was combined in 2020 with two other parishes on Chicago's north side to form the new St. Elizabeth of the Trinity Parish, with St. Tarcissus designated the parish church (and the other two churches relegated to "profane but not sordid use" in 2021).

Saint José Sánchez del Río was nicknamed "Tarcisius".

== Poem by Damasus ==
The first five lines say that both Stephen (the protomartyr) and Tarcisius are equal in merit, and Stephen's death (as recorded in the Acts of the Apostles) is retold poetically. The last four lines can be translated as:

When an insane gang pressed saintly Tarcisius, who was carrying the sacraments of Christ, to display them to the profane, he preferred to be killed and give up his life rather than betray to rabid dogs the heavenly body.
