= Malombra (1917 film) =

1917 film directed by Carmine Gallone

- Screenshot
- Directed by: Carmine Gallone
- Written by: Antonio Fogazzaro
- Starring: Lyda Borelli
- Cinematography: Giovanni Grimaldi
- Release date: February 1917
- Running time: 75 minutes
- Country: Italy
- Language: Silent

Malombra is a 1917 silent Italian drama film directed by Carmine Gallone. The film was shown as part of the Silent Divas of the Italian Cinema programme at the 38th New York Film Festival in 2000. It is an adaptation of the 1881 novel Malombra by Antonio Fogazzaro, which was later adapted into a 1942 film of the same name.

== Plot ==
Marina di Malombra (Borelli) is forced to live in a castle on Lake Como prior to her wedding. She reads letters written by Cecilia, one of her ancestors who was driven to death by her uncle, and begins to believe that she herself is Cecilia. She takes revenge on Cecilia's behalf by murdering her own uncle, but then, realizing what she's done, commits suicide.

== Reception ==
The film premiered on February 15, 1917. Tito Alacci wrote for Film that Malombra was a visually marvelous movie, with particular praise for "the magnificence of its visuals, its superb use of color, and its technical execution", and that moviegoers would express admiration in the theater for the visual shots of Lake Como. However, he criticized the plot and acting, saying that it could neither "entertain, move, nor persuade" an ordinary audience, and that the presence of well-known actors like Borelli in the main roles was jarring and dramatically stifling.

== Cast ==
- Lyda Borelli as Marina di Malombra
- Amleto Novelli as Corrado Silla
- Augusto Mastripietri as Cesare d'Ormegno
- Amedeo Ciaffi as Steinegge
- Francesco Cacace as Conte Salvador
- Consuelo Spada as Edith Steinegge
- Giulia Cassini-Rizzotto as Contessa Salvador
