= Lyda Borelli =

Italian actress (1884–1959)

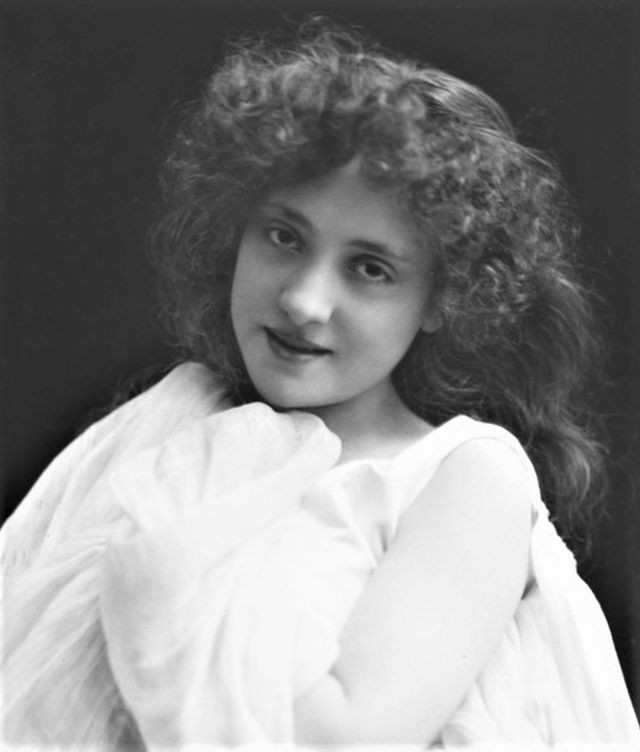
- Born: Lyda Borelli; 22 March 1884; Genoa, Kingdom of Italy
- Died: 2 June 1959 (aged 75); Rome, Italy
- Occupation: Actress
- Years active: 1902–1918
- Spouse(s): Vittorio Cini, Count of Monselice (m. 1918)
- Children: 4

Lyda Cini, Countess of Monselice (née Borelli; 22 March 1884 – 2 June 1959) was an Italian actress of cinema and theatre. Her career in theatre started when she was a child, acting on stage with Paola Pezzaglia in the French drama I due derelitti.

== Biography ==
Lyda Borelli was born on 22 March 1884, the second child to stage actors Napoleone Borelli and Cesira Banti Borelli. She had an older sister, Alda (1879–1964), who also became an actress.

Borelli made her stage debut in 1902, and, by the age of 18, she was already receiving lead roles and had become a favorite actress of Gabriele D’Annunzio. In 1904, she starred in D’Annunzio's La Figlia di Jorio, and D'Annunzio dedicated his books Il ferro and Più che l’amore to her.

By 1908, Borelli was considered a fashion icon; Borellismo and Borelleggiare both became terms used to describe how women tried to pose, dress, and move like Lyda Borelli.

In 1913, Borelli made her film debut in Ma l'amor mio non muore, directed by Mario Caserini, who was considered to be the best Italian silent film director, and starring opposite Mario Bonnard.

Between 1913 and 1918 Borelli made 14 films and appeared in 2 documentaries. She often portrayed vamps who end up committing suicide via poison. Her acting was mainly based on excessive gestures, painful expressions and languid gazes. Antonio Gramsci, who, in 1917 worked as a theatre reviewer, criticised her stating she represented a heightened form of sensuality, "a part of a primordial and prehistoric humanity" that had managed to cast a spell on the audience.

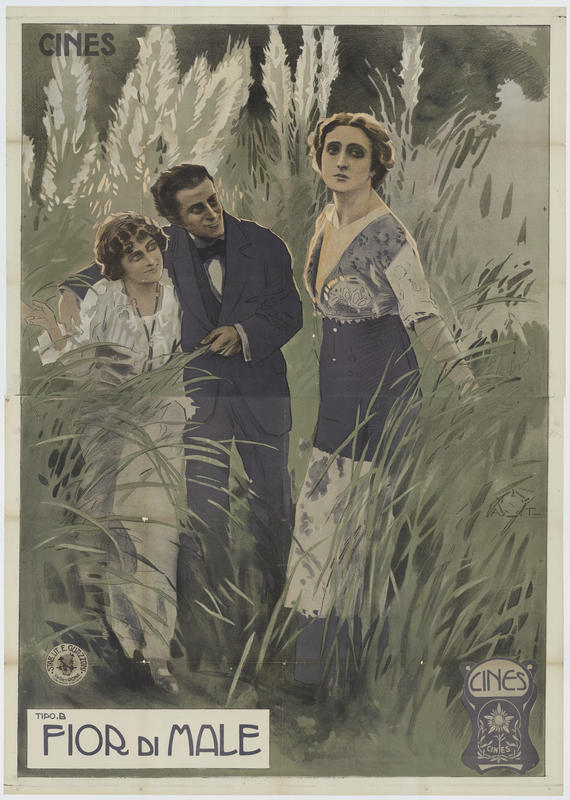
Lyda Borelli in the poster for Fior di male.

Novelist Lucio D'Ambra wrote about her in 1937: "The new goddess eclipsed with her aesthetic prestige all the others; young Italian women literally moulded themselves on this sinuous statue that, struck by love pangs, harmoniously twisted and turned like a sensual music. Women at the time loved her grand gestures on stage and on the big screen and tried to imitate as much as they could those plastic yet sensual movements. What later on happened with Greta Garbo, had happened in Italy with Lyda Borelli a few years earlier. It was easy to meet in the literary salons and cafes, at the theatre and in the streets many little Borellis who starved themselves ending up looking like sinuously serpentine shadows, thin, wrapped up and draped in the shortest fabric swatches they could find among the stocks of the silk shops."

In 1918, at the height of her career, Borelli retired and married Vittorio Cini, Count of Monselice (1885–1977). The two had four children together: Giorgio, Mynna, and twins Ylda and Yana.

Vittorio Cini had a long relationship with the Italian Fascist party, joining in 1926, and had occupied influential positions within government and industry throughout the decades of Benito Mussolini's rule. In early 1943 he was named to the Ministry of Communication, but soon resigned, publicly castigating the obviously dire state of the national situation. He joined the plotting against Mussolini, and with the Nazi occupation of Northern Italy, he was arrested by the SS and sent to the Dachau concentration camp. Transferred to a hospital, his son Giorgio was able to get him released by bribing officials with diamonds and jewellery. Giorgio would also lobby successfully against the elder Cini's legal exclusion from political activities, arguing that his final break with Mussolini mitigated his long years of collaboration.

Giorgio died in a plane crash near Cannes on 31 August 1949. After his death, Vittorio established the Cini Foundation in his memory.

Lyda Borelli died on 2 June 1959 and was buried at Ferrara Charterhouse alongside her son. Her husband, Vittorio, was buried with her upon his death in 1977, as was one of her daughters, Yana, in 1989, along with her husband, Fabrizio, in 2017.

== Filmography ==
- Ma l'amor mio non muore (1913)
- La memoria dell'altro (1913)
- La donna nuda (1914)
- Fior di male (1915)
- Rapsodia satanica (1915)
- La marcia nuziale (1915)
- La falena (1916)
- Madame Tallien (1916)
- Malombra (1917)
- Carnevalesca (1917)
- Il dramma di una notte, intitolato anche Una notte a Calcutta, (1917)
- La storia dei tredici (1917)
- La leggenda di Santa Barbara (1918)

== Artworks ==
- Portrait of Lyda Borelli, painting by Giuseppe Amisani oil on cardboard, 29.5 cm × 29 cm (11.6 in × 11.4 in)
- Portrait of Lyda Borelli, painting by Cesare Tallone oil on canvas

== Gallery ==
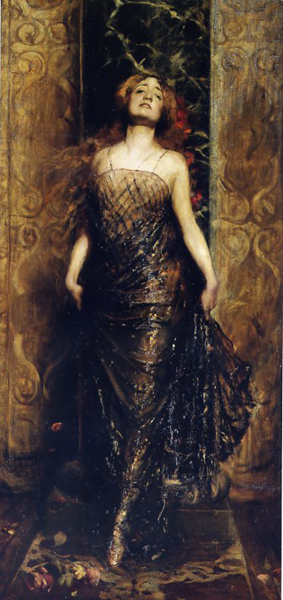
Painting by Cesare Tallone

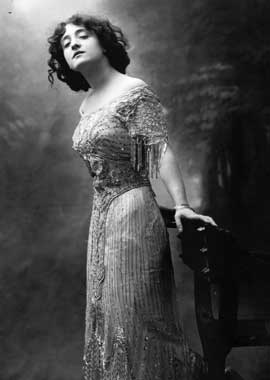
Photograph by Mario Nunes Vais

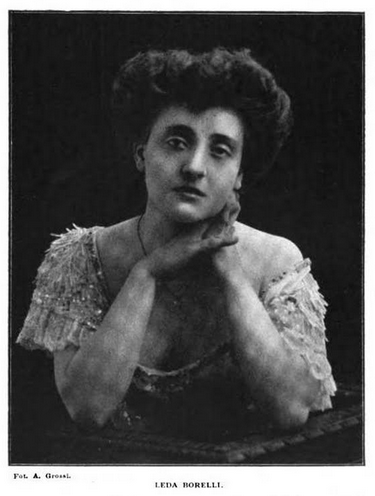
1907 photograph

== See also ==
- Romolo Manissero
