= The Sack of Rome (film) =

1920 film

- Directed by: Enrico Guazzoni; Giulio Aristide Sartorio
- Written by: Emilio Calvi; Fausto Salvatori; Giulio Aristide Sartorio
- Starring: Livio Pavanelli; Raimondo Van Riel
- Production company: Guazzoni Film
- Release date: October 1920
- Country: Italy
- Languages: Silent; Italian intertitles

The Sack of Rome (Italian: Il Sacco di Roma) is a 1920 Italian silent historical film directed by Enrico Guazzoni and Giulio Aristide Sartorio. The film portrays the 1527 Sack of Rome.

== Cast ==
- Beppo Corradi
- Tullio Ferri
- Irma Julians
- Ida Magrini
- Giuseppe Majone Diaz
- Silvia Malinverni
- Haydee Mercatali
- Livio Pavanelli
- Carlo Simoneschi
- Raimondo Van Riel

== Sources ==
- Moliterno, Gino. Historical Dictionary of Italian Cinema. Scarecrow Press, 2008.
