= Giulio Aristide Sartorio =

Italian painter and film director (1860–1932)

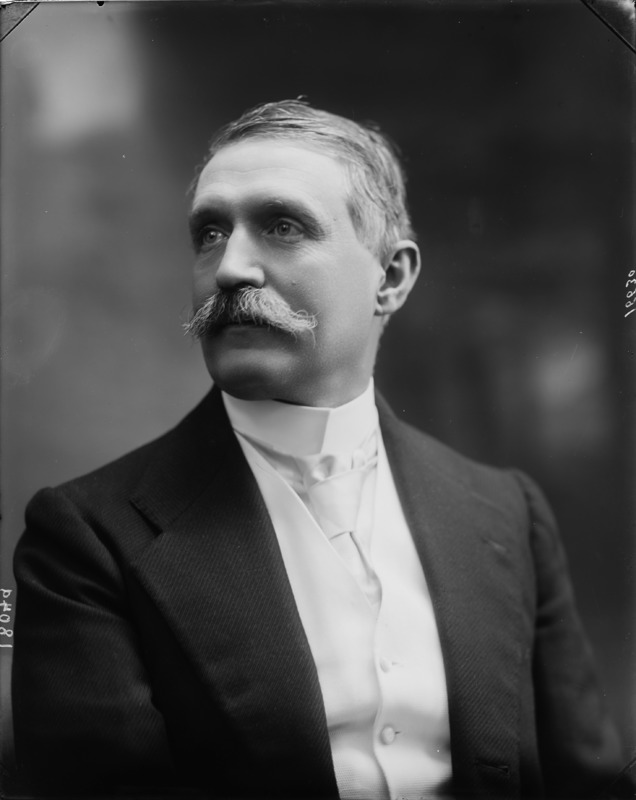
- Born: February 11, 1860; Rome, Papal States (now Italy)
- Died: October 3, 1932 (aged 72); Rome
- Education: Rome Institute of Fine Arts
- Occupations: Painter, film director

Giulio Aristide Sartorio (11 February 1860 – 3 October 1932) was an Italian painter and film director from Rome.

== Biography ==
Having attended the Rome Institute of Fine Arts, Sartorio presented a Symbolist work at the 1883 International Exposition of Rome. He formed friendships with Nino Costa and Gabriele D’Annunzio, and associated with the painters and photographers of the Roman countryside. He won a gold medal at the Paris Universal Exhibition of 1889 and met the Pre-Raphaelites in England in 1893. His participation in the Venice Biennale began in 1895 with the 1st International Exposition of Art of Venice, after which he taught at the Weimar Academy of Fine Arts from 1896 to 1898.

His period of greatest renown came at the beginning of the century, when he produced decorative friezes for the 5th Esposizione Internazionale d'Arte of Venice (1903), the Mostra Nazionale of Fine Arts (Milan, Parco Sempione, 1906) and Palazzo Montecitorio in Rome (1908–12). Wounded during World War I, he travelled extensively in the Middle East, Japan and Latin America during the 1920s and became a member of the Italian Royal Academy.

== Works ==
His most famous works are: Diana of Ephes and the slaves, Gorgon and the Heroes (1895–99) and a frieze in the Palazzo Montecitorio. He also collaborated with Gabriele D'Annunzio in a magazine entitled The Banquet (1895–98).

He directed the motion picture Il mistero di Galatea (1919), starring Marga Sevilla, his wife, who studied acting with Eleonora Duse.

== Selected filmography ==
- The Sack of Rome (1920)

== Gallery ==
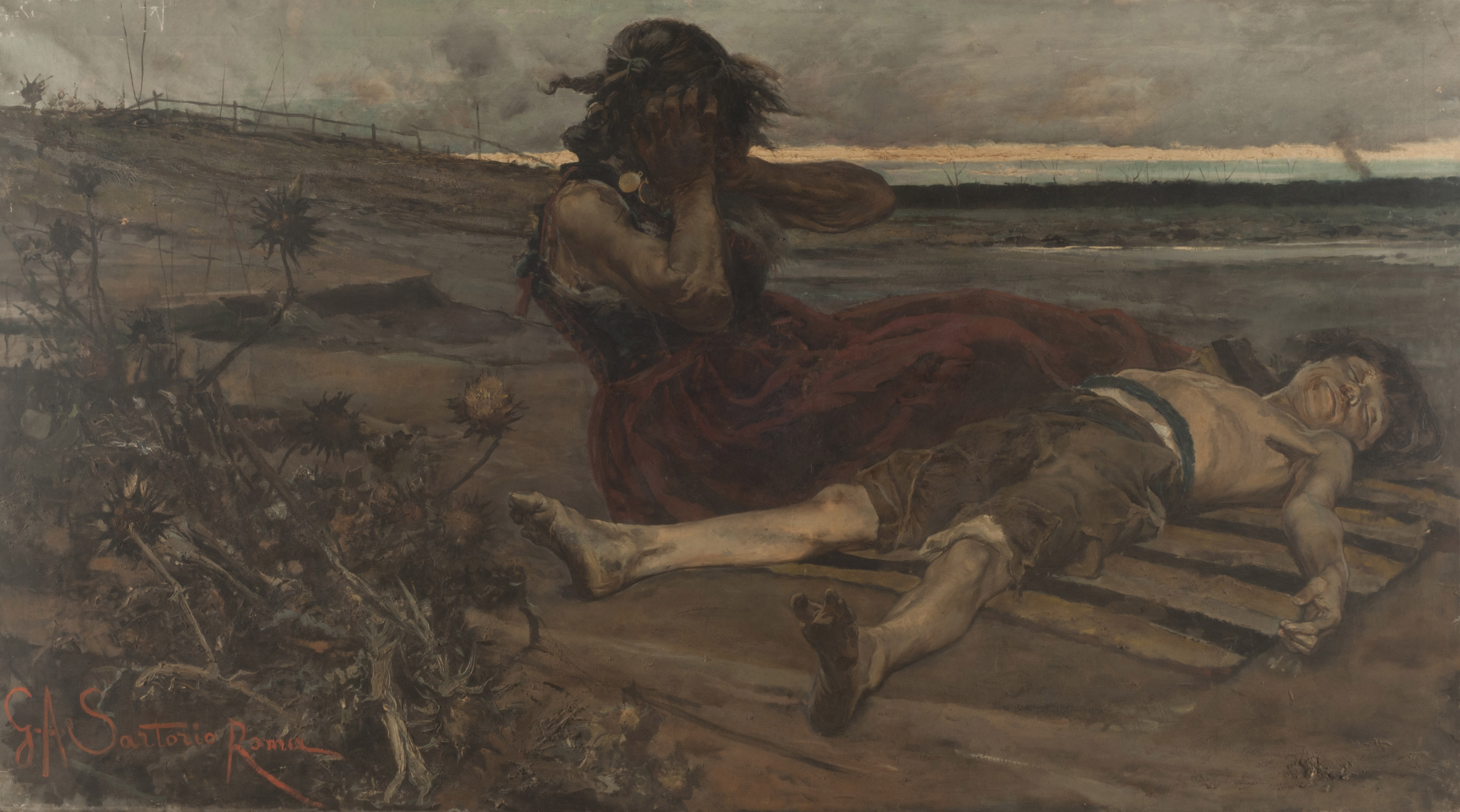
Malaria (1883). National Museum of Fine Arts, Buenos Aires

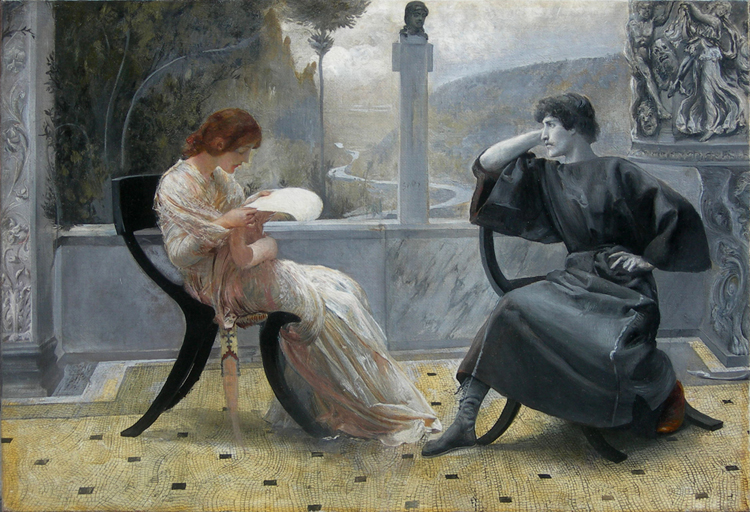
The Reading (Catullus and Clodia)

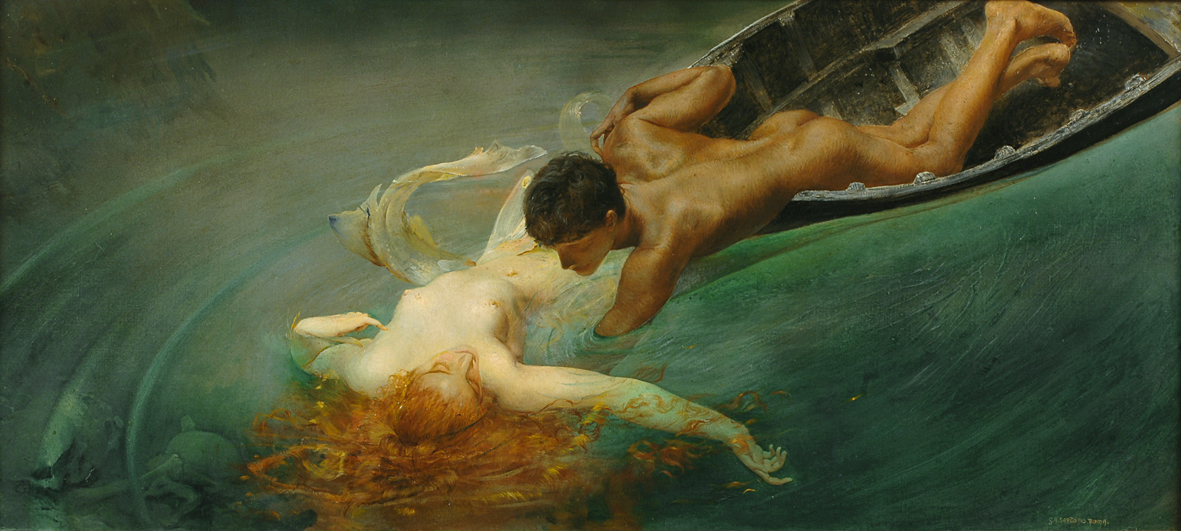
Siren or Green Abyss (1893). Civic Gallery of Modern and Contemporary Art, Turin

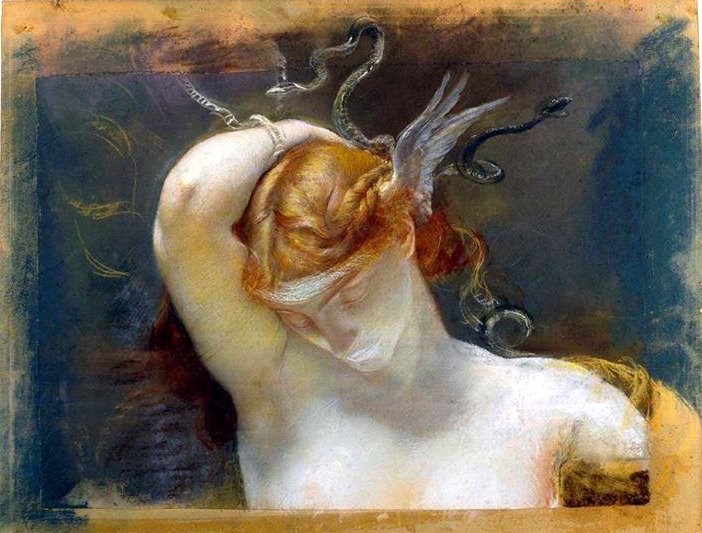
Study of the Head of the Gorgon for The Gorgon and the Heroes (c. 1895). National Gallery of Modern and Contemporary Art, Rome

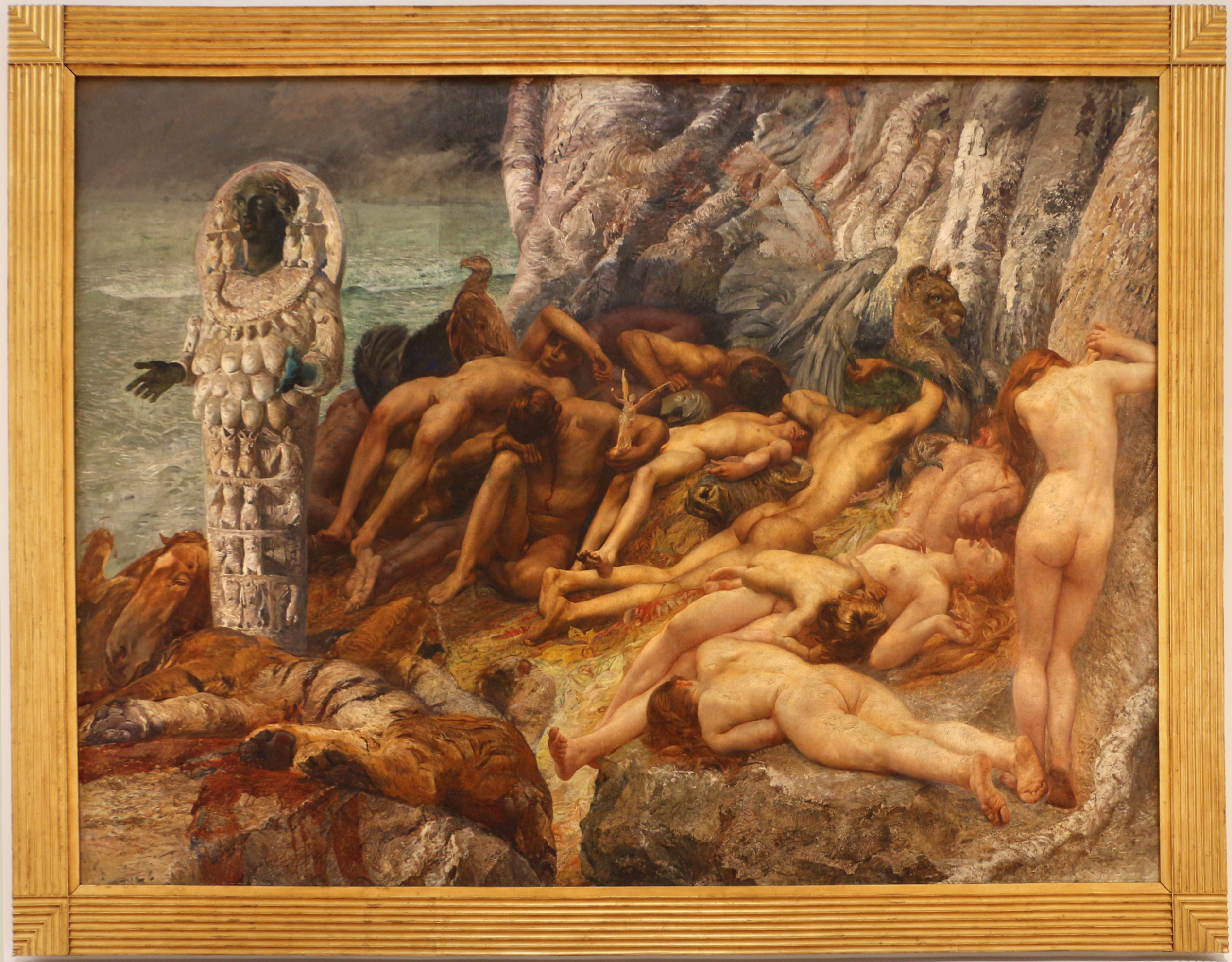
Diana of Ephesus and the slaves (c. 1895-1899). National Gallery of Modern and Contemporary Art, Rome

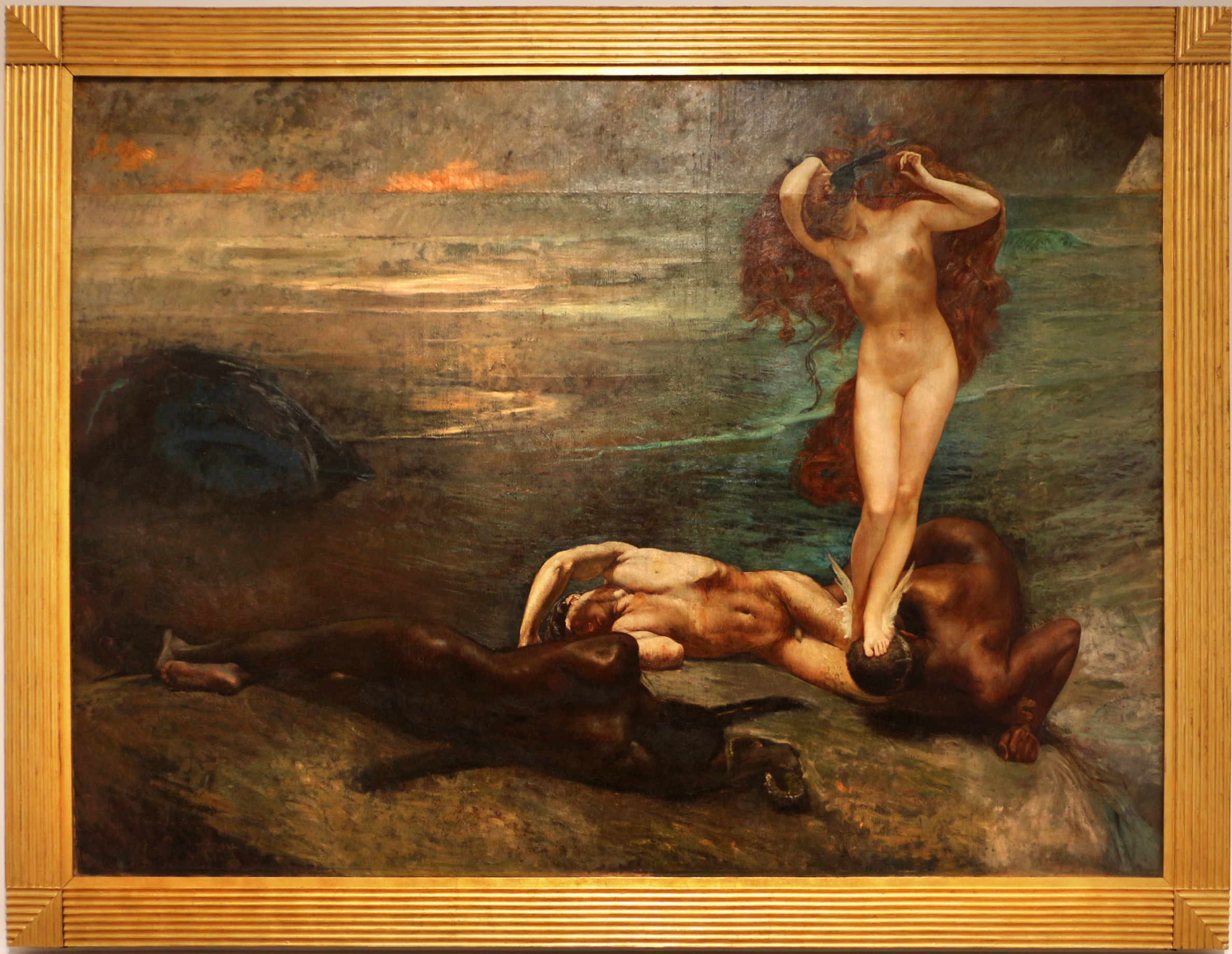
The Gorgon and the Heroes (c. 1897-1899). National Gallery of Modern and Contemporary Art, Rome

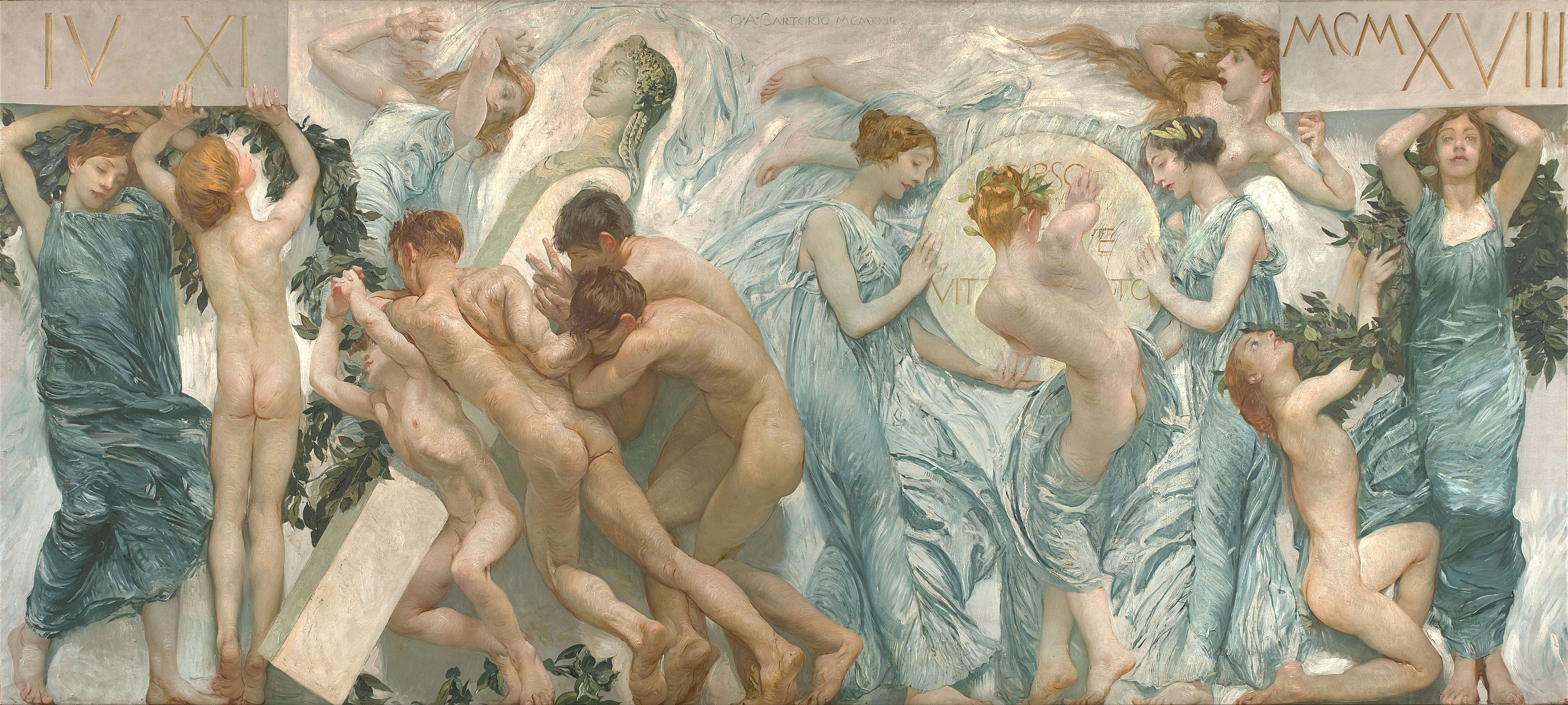
Sagra, Example of the Art Nouveau style by Giulio Aristide Sartorio. Gallerie di Piazza Scala, Milan

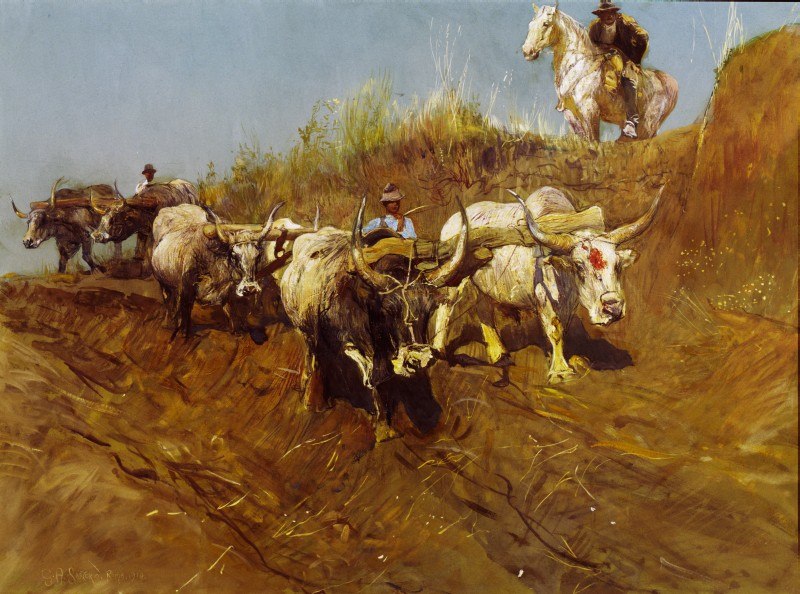
November plowing or Oxen at the plow (1914) (Views of the Roman countryside). Art collections of Fondazione Cariplo
