= Kiki Palmer =

Italian actress (1907–1949)

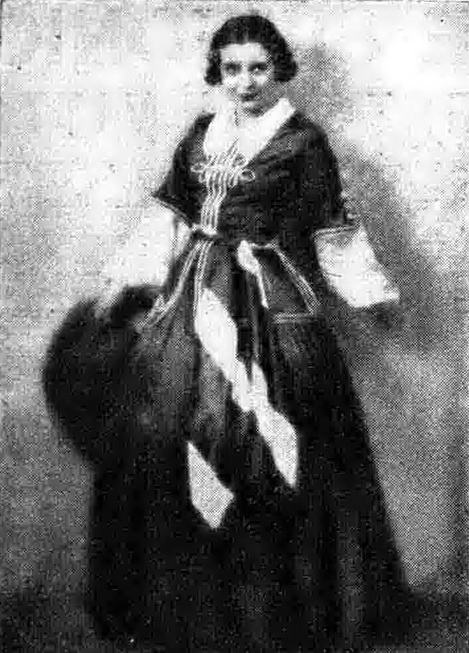
- Palmer in 1935
- Born: Giulia Fogliata; July 11, 1907; Milan, Kingdom of Italy
- Died: August 11, 1949 (aged 42); Milan, Italy
- Occupation: Actress

Giulia Fogliata (July 11, 1907 – August 11, 1949), better known by her stage names Kiki Palmer and Daniela Palmer, was an Italian stage, film, and radio actress.

== Life and career ==
Born in Milan, after an occasional acting experience at the Teatro degli Arcimboldi Palmer left her university studies in medicine to become an actress. After studying acting under Ida Carloni Talli, in 1931 she began using the 'Kiki Palmer' stage name. Palmer was one of the most well known Italian stage actresses of her time, and came to be highly regarded outside of Italy as well. From 1938 to 1939, Palmer used the stagename "Palma Palmer", a name suggested to her by artist Gabriele D'Annunzio.

Palmer committed suicide in Rome on August 11, 1949, after the death of her friend Eva Mangili, who she considered a second mother.

== Personal life ==
Palmer was the adoptive mother of actor Renzo Palmer.

== Selected filmography ==
- The Wedding March (1934)
- La luce del mondo (1935)
