= La falena (film) =

1916 film directed by Carmine Gallone

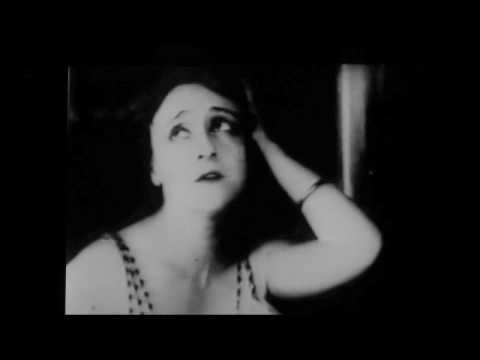
- Directed by: Carmine Gallone
- Written by: Henry Bataille (play Le Phalène); Carmine Gallone
- Starring: Lyda Borelli
- Cinematography: Domenico Grimaldi
- Release date: March 1916
- Country: Italy
- Language: Silent

La falena is a 1916 silent Italian drama film directed by Carmine Gallone. The film is considered to be lost, with only a fragment surviving in the film archive of the Cineteca Italiana.

== Plot ==
Thea (Borelli) is a sculptor diagnosed with phthisis before she marries Filippo (Habay). After abandoning him, her health begins to decline. She organises a final party, inviting her estranged husband. He fails to show, as he's now married to another woman. Thea appears naked in front of her guests before she kills herself.

== Cast ==
- Lyda Borelli as Thea di Marlievo
- Andrea Habay as Filippo
- Francesco Cacace as Lignères
- Giulia Cassini-Rizzotto as Principessa Maria
- Nella Montagna as La madre di Thea
- Lina Dax as Allegra
- Alfonso Cassini as Il maestro di Thea
