= Messalina (1924 film) =

1924 film

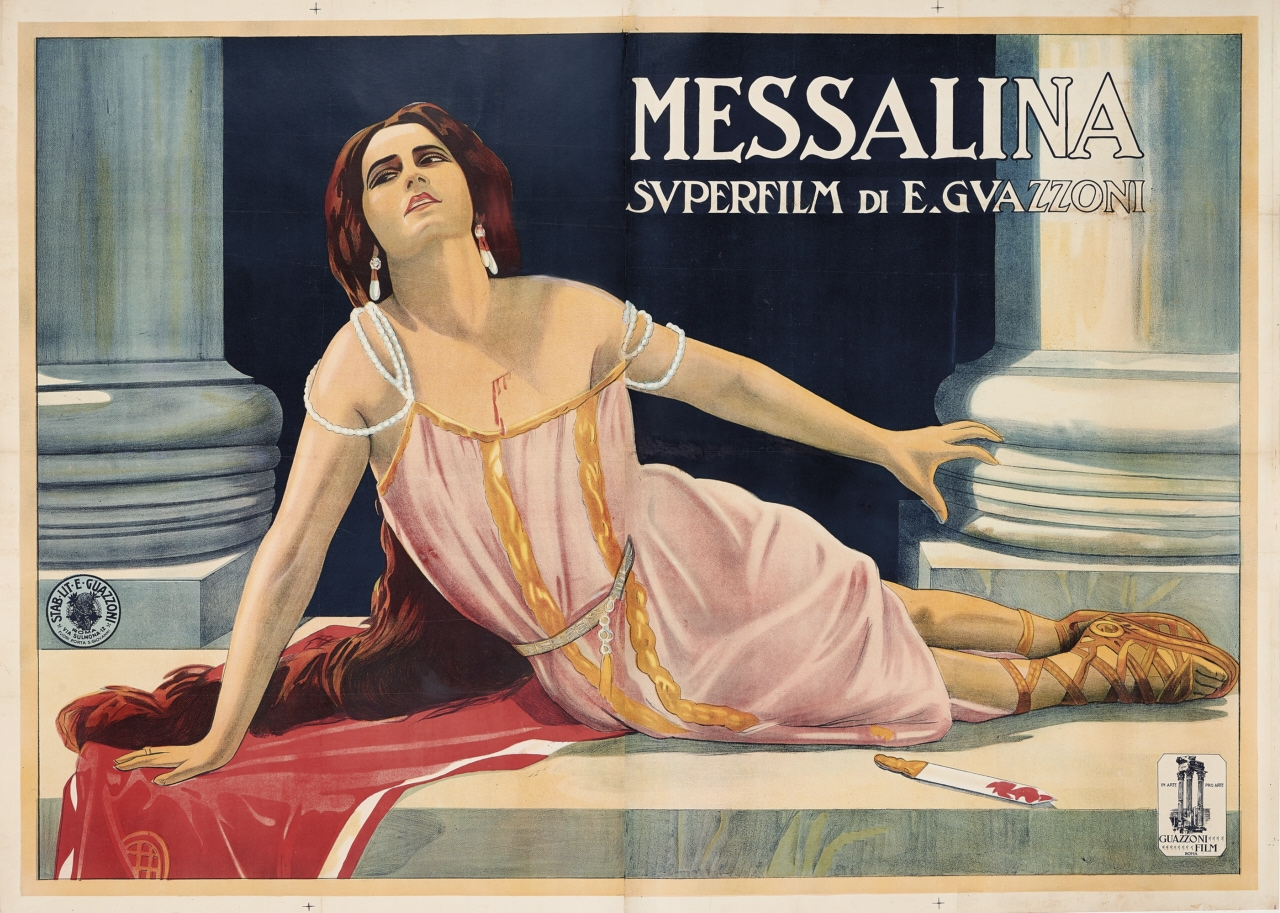
- Directed by: Enrico Guazzoni
- Written by: Enrico Guazzoni
- Starring: Rina De Liguoro; Calisto Bertramo; Gildo Bocci
- Cinematography: Victor Arménise; Alfredo Lenci
- Production company: Guazzoni Film
- Distributed by: Guazzoni Film
- Release date: 1924
- Country: Italy
- Languages: Silent; Italian intertitles

Messalina is a 1924 Italian historical drama film directed by Enrico Guazzoni and starring Rina De Liguoro, Calisto Bertramo, and Gildo Bocci. It portrays the life of Messalina, the third wife of the Roman Emperor Claudius.

== Cast ==
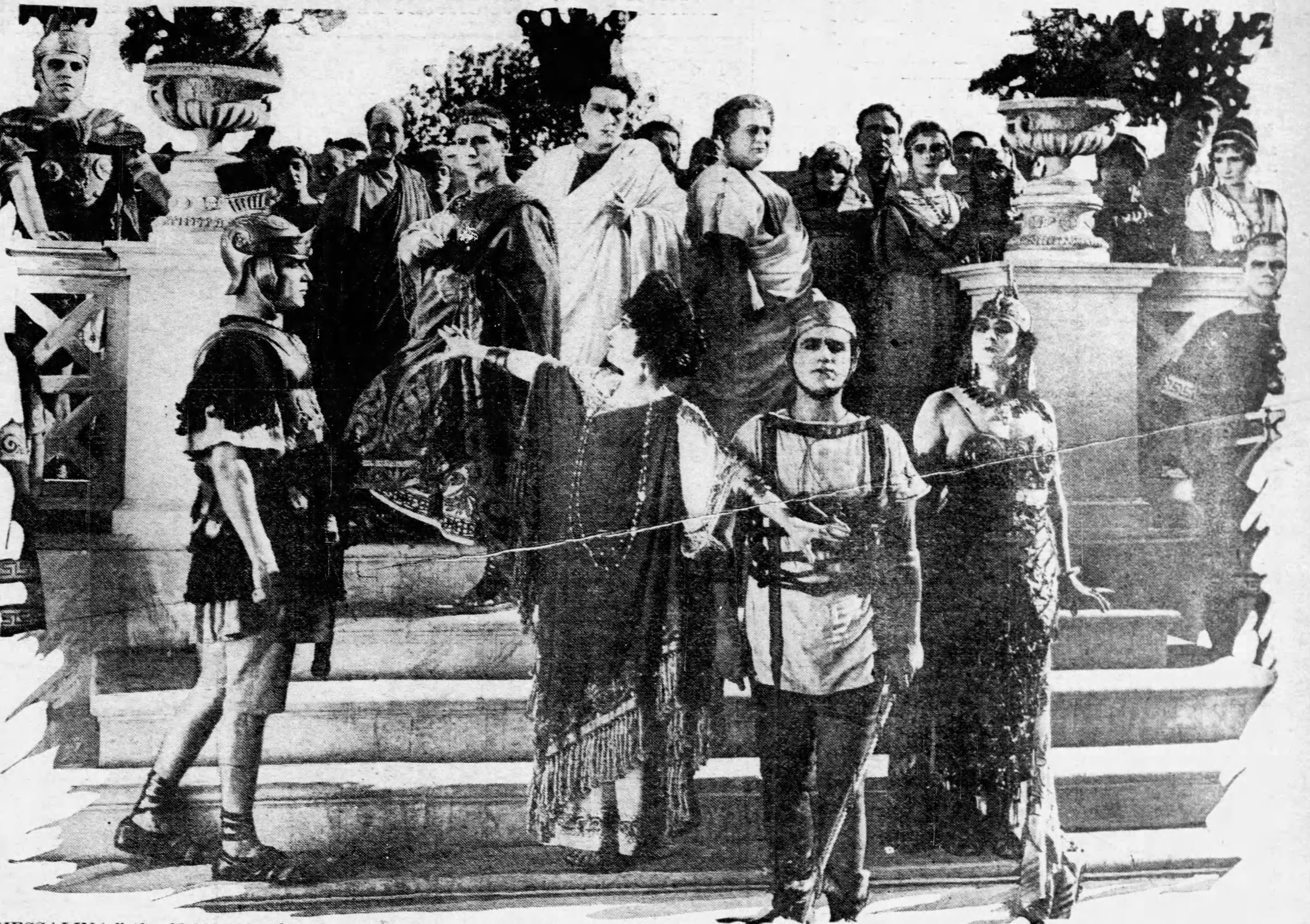
A publicity photo from the film. De Liguoro as Messalina in center

- Rina De Liguoro as Messalina
- Calisto Bertramo
- Gildo Bocci as Apollonio
- Bruto Castellani as Tigrane
- Mario Cusmich
- Édouard de Max
- Alfredo de Felice
- Aristide Garbini as Narciso
- Rita Jolivet
- Augusto Mastripietri as Claudio
- Gino Talamo as Ennio
- Gianna Terribili-Gonzales as Mirit
- Adolfo Trouché
- Lucia Zanussi as Egle

== Bibliography ==
- Moliterno, Gino. Historical Dictionary of Italian Cinema. Scarecrow Press, 2008.
