= Giulia Cassini Rizzotto =

Italian film director and actress (1865–1943)

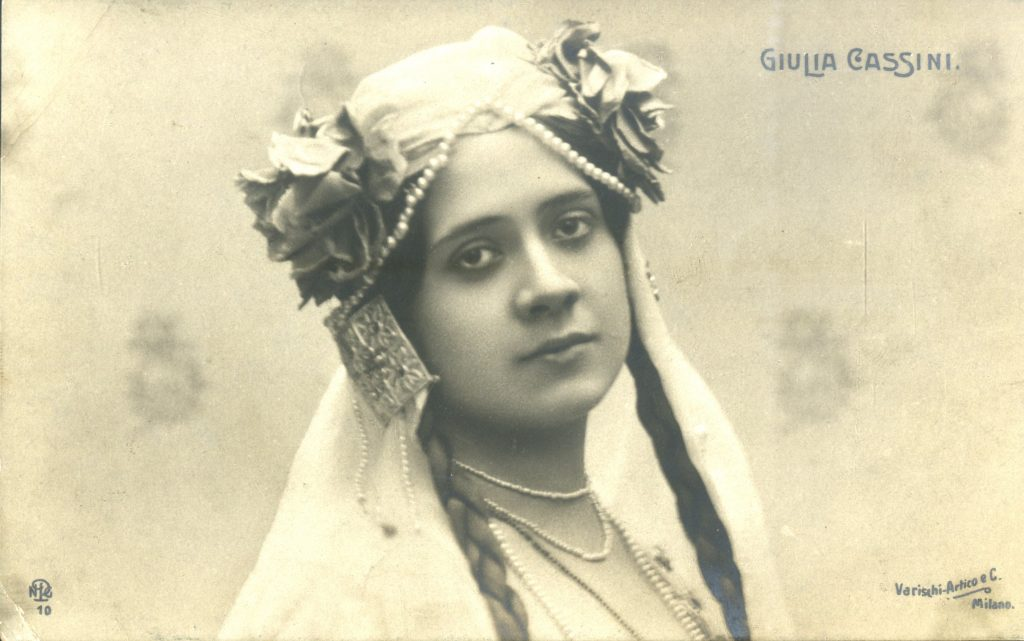
- Rizzotto depicted on a postcard
- Born: 15 June 1865; Palermo, Italy
- Died: 24 August 1943 (aged 78); Buenos Aires, Argentina
- Occupation(s): Actor, Director, Kindergarten teacher, Novelist, Translator, Writer
- Spouse: Alfonso Cassini (m. 1902)

Giulia Cassini Rizzotto (15 June 1865 – 24 August 1943) was an Italian actress and film director, kindergarten teacher, novelist, translator and writer. She appeared in many films in Italy including Malombra (1917) and Fabiola (1918).

== Biography ==
Rizzotto was born in 1865 into a family of theatre actors with her father, Giuseppe Rizzotto a dialect actor who had his own theatre troupe. She first appeared on stage in his troupe.

They worked together as daughter and father on the Latium Film in Rome, Giulia Cassini Rizzotto met Alfonso Cassini; and they married in 1902. Her husband was a film actor throughout his life. She made her film debut in 1912 at the age of forty-seven where she appeared in melodrama films set in Rome.

An early appearance was in 1914 in Paternità, a short film that also starred Alfonso Cassini and Eugenio de Liguoro. Her directing career from the 1910s to the early 1920s includes La Piccola Manon (1920) and Scugni (1918).

She had her own acting school in Rome named School of Cinematic Art Cassini Rizzotto. She was one of the first Italian women to be behind the camera. She worked on five films, with her most recognisable film being her first, Scugni, in 1918. It was produced by her and her husband. He had written the script and acted under her direction.

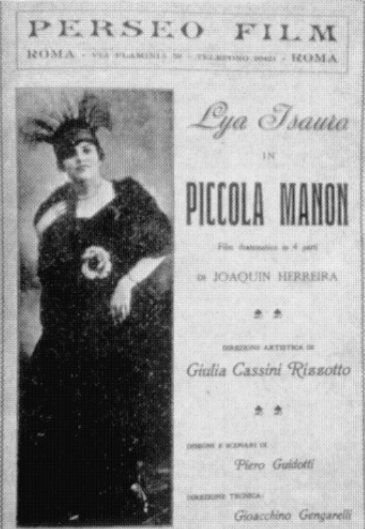
La Piccola Manon, her 1920 film

Unfortunately due to the low recognition of female directors and actresses in the early 1900s film footage is hard to gather and most of Rizzotto's work is hard to come by. Her second film was co-directed with Mario Corsi and it was not fiction but it concerned the life of Leonardo da Vinci. In 1920 she directed two films produced by Perseo Film and were both described as large. Her acting in La Piccola Manon was well received but Lya Isauro and Alberto Monti who took leading roles less so.

Her fifth and last film she directed was Mosca Cieca (Blindman's Buff). This film is extant. The film's story was her idea and it involved two couples where the women are rich and the men are penniless aristocrats. It was funded by the Vatican and the cast employed genuine nobility. The premiere was in Rome, featured at a special evening.

In later life, towards the end of the 1920s, Rizzotto travelled to Argentina with Maria Melato's theatre group, following the death of her husband. She opened an acting school in Buenos Aires and worked there until her death in 1943.

== Selected filmography ==
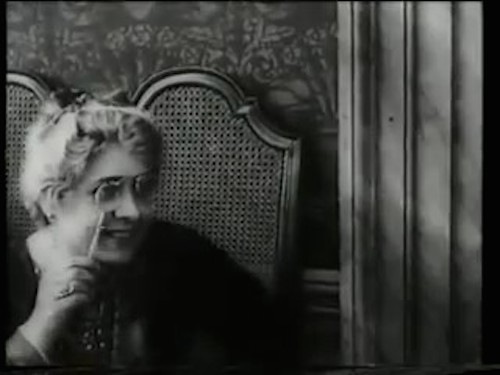
Cassini Rizzotto in Malombra in 1917

=== Acting ===
- Redde rationem - 1912
- Capriccio fatale! - 1912
- Il romanzo di Luisa - 1913
- Christus - 1914
- Pulcinella - 1915
- Camille - 1915
- La falena - 1916
- Alla capitale - 1916
- Gli onori della guerra - 1917
- Fabiola - 1918
- Scugni - 1918
- La piccola Manon - 1920
- Germaine - 1923
- Triboulet - 1923

=== Directing ===
- Leonardo Da Vinci - 1919
- A Mosca cieca - 1924
