= The Crusaders (1918 film) =

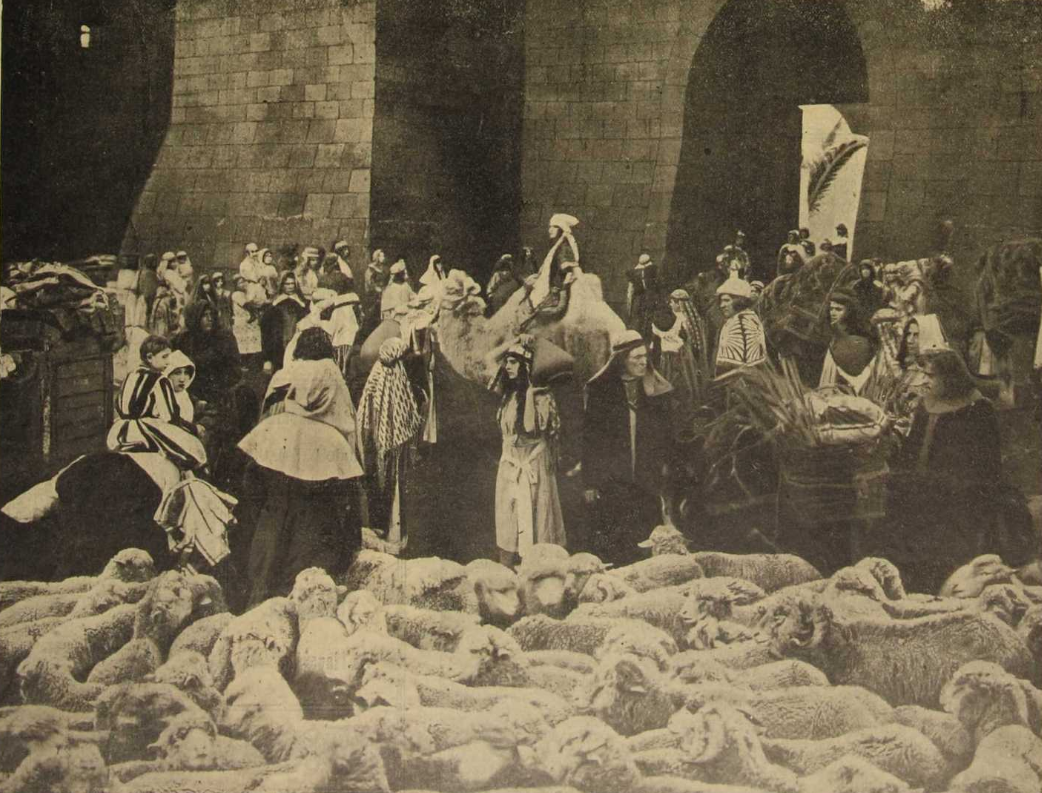
- Directed by: Enrico Guazzoni
- Written by: Torquato Tasso (poem); Enrico Guazzoni
- Starring: Amleto Novelli; Elena Sangro
- Cinematography: Alfredo Lenci
- Production company: Guazzoni Film
- Release date: April 1918
- Country: Italy
- Languages: Silent; Italian intertitles

The Crusaders or Jerusalem Liberated (Italian: La Gerusalemme liberata) is a 1918 Italian silent historical film directed by Enrico Guazzoni. It is based on the poem Jerusalem Delivered by Torquato Tasso. The film is set during the Crusades and describes Godfrey of Bouillon's conquest of Jerusalem in 1099.

== Cast ==
In alphabetical order

- Olga Benetti as Clorinda
- Laura Brezet
- Beppo Corradi
- Edy Darclea
- Americo De Giorgio
- Aristide Garbini
- Alfredo Gelmi
- Adolfo Geri
- Mity Mignone
- Eduardo Monteneve
- Amleto Novelli
- Rinaldo Rinaldi
- Elena Sangro
- Ljubomir Stanojevic

== Bibliography ==
- Moliterno, Gino (2009). The A to Z of Italian Cinema. Lanham, Maryland: Scarecrow Press. ISBN 978-0810870598.
