= Brutus (1911 film) =

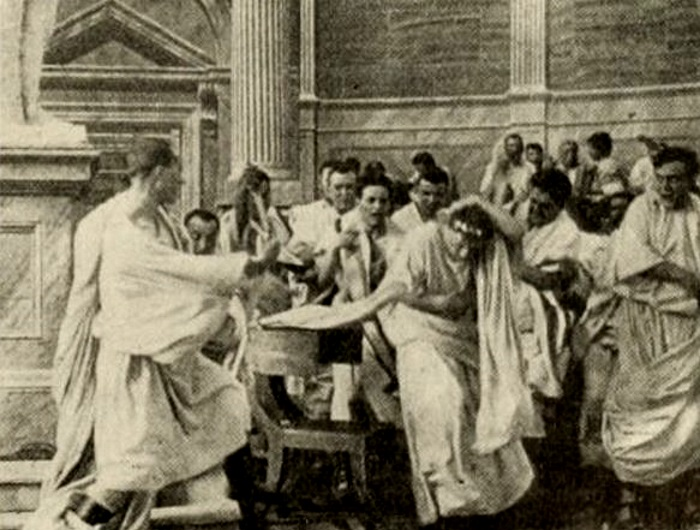
- Directed by: Enrico Guazzoni
- Written by: Enrico Guazzoni
- Produced by: Filoteo Alberini
- Starring: Amleto Novelli
- Production company: Società Italiana Cines
- Distributed by: Società Italiana Cines
- Release date: November 1911
- Country: Italy
- Languages: Silent; Italian intertitles

Brutus is a 1911 Italian silent historical film directed by Enrico Guazzoni and starring Amleto Novelli. The film portrays the life of Marcus Junius Brutus the Younger, one of the assassins of Julius Caesar. The film was moderately successful, but not on the scale of his Quo Vadis the following year which was a major international hit.

== Bibliography ==
- Moliterno, Gino (2008). Historical Dictionary of Italian Cinema. Lanham, Maryland: Scarecrow Press. ISBN 978-0810862548.
