= Enrico Guazzoni =

Italian screenwriter and film director

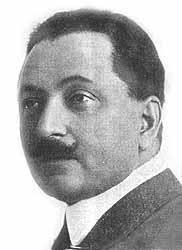
- Enrico Guazzoni
- Born: Enrico Guazzone; December 18, 1876; Rome, Kingdom of Italy
- Died: September 23, 1949 (aged 72); Rome, Italy
- Occupations: Film director; screenwriter; producer
- Years active: 1907–1931
- Notable work: Quo Vadis?
- Spouse: Livia Leonzio (m. 1909)

Signature
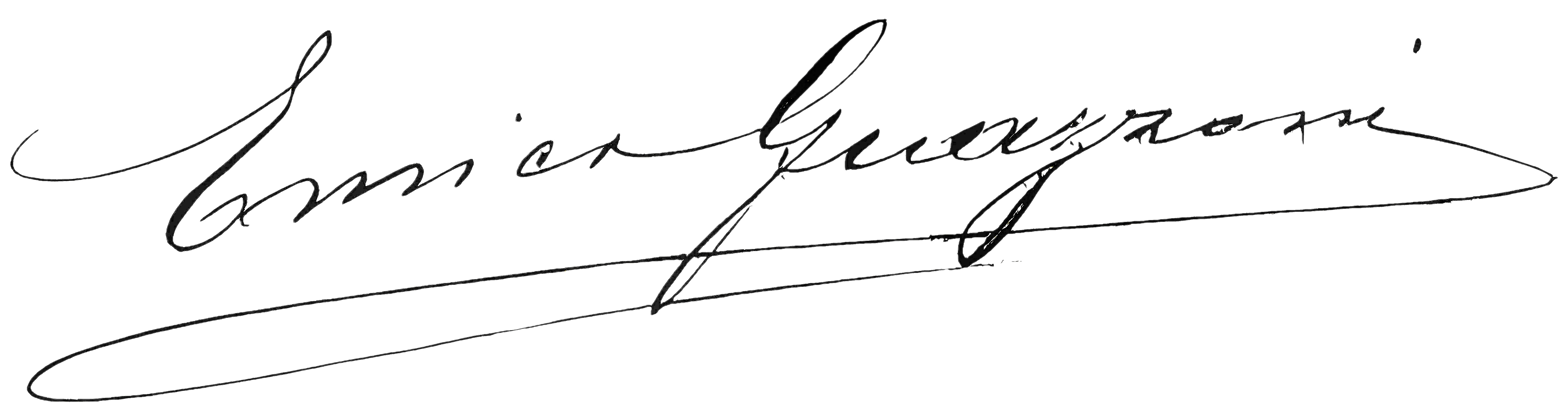

Enrico Guazzoni (18 December 1876 – 23 September 1949) was an Italian screenwriter and film director. He is renowned for his silent historical films, which set the standard for epic cinema in the early twentieth century. Guazzoni was the uncle of Jolanda Kodra, an Italian-Albanian writer and translator.

== Biography ==
Enrico Guazzoni was born in Rome on 18 December 1876 to Bartolomeo and Ginevra Santucci. After graduating from the Accademia di Belle Arti di Roma, he began a career as a genre painter. In 1901, he met the film producer Filoteo Alberini, who offered him a job at Cines, Alberini's film production company Guazzoni made his debut as a writer and director in 1907 with the comedy film Un invitato a pranzo, starring André Deed. The following year, he founded the film company Cosmos, for which he directed a documentary and two films starring Gianna Terribili-Gonzales, Il romanzo di una ciociara and Fiore selvaggio.

In 1909, Guazzoni made two more films with Terribili-Gonzales: Adriana and La nuova mammina. He also co-directed an adaptation of Collodi's Pinocchio with Giulio Antamoro. The following year, he finally achieved success with two historical productions set in ancient Rome: Brutus and Agrippina. These spectacular epics involved massive crowds and employed 2,000 extras instead of the usual 30–40. Guazzoni designed the sets and costumes for both films himself, drawing on his experience as a painter and decorator – a practice that would accompany him for years to come.

That same year, Guazzoni directed the historical films Faust and Andreuccio da Perugia, both of which starred Amleto Novelli. These were followed in 1911 by the biblical dramas The Maccabees and Jerusalem Delivered, which established Cines as a leading Italian production company specialising in historical monumental films. In the same year, Guazzoni's short film Il Poverello di Assisi was awarded second prize in the artistic film section of the Turin International. The film was distributed in Germany and Great Britain. Filmed largely on location in Assisi, it drew on Guazzoni's academic and artistic background, meticulously capturing the characters, costumes and settings with philological precision.

Before making his films, Guazzoni would carefully prepare in libraries, museums and antique shops, gathering historical documentation on the customs and traditions of the period to be reproduced. He then personally oversaw the details of hairstyles, clothing and weapons, entrusting their execution to various craftsmen – tailors, prop makers and carpenters – under his direct supervision.

== Quo Vadis? ==
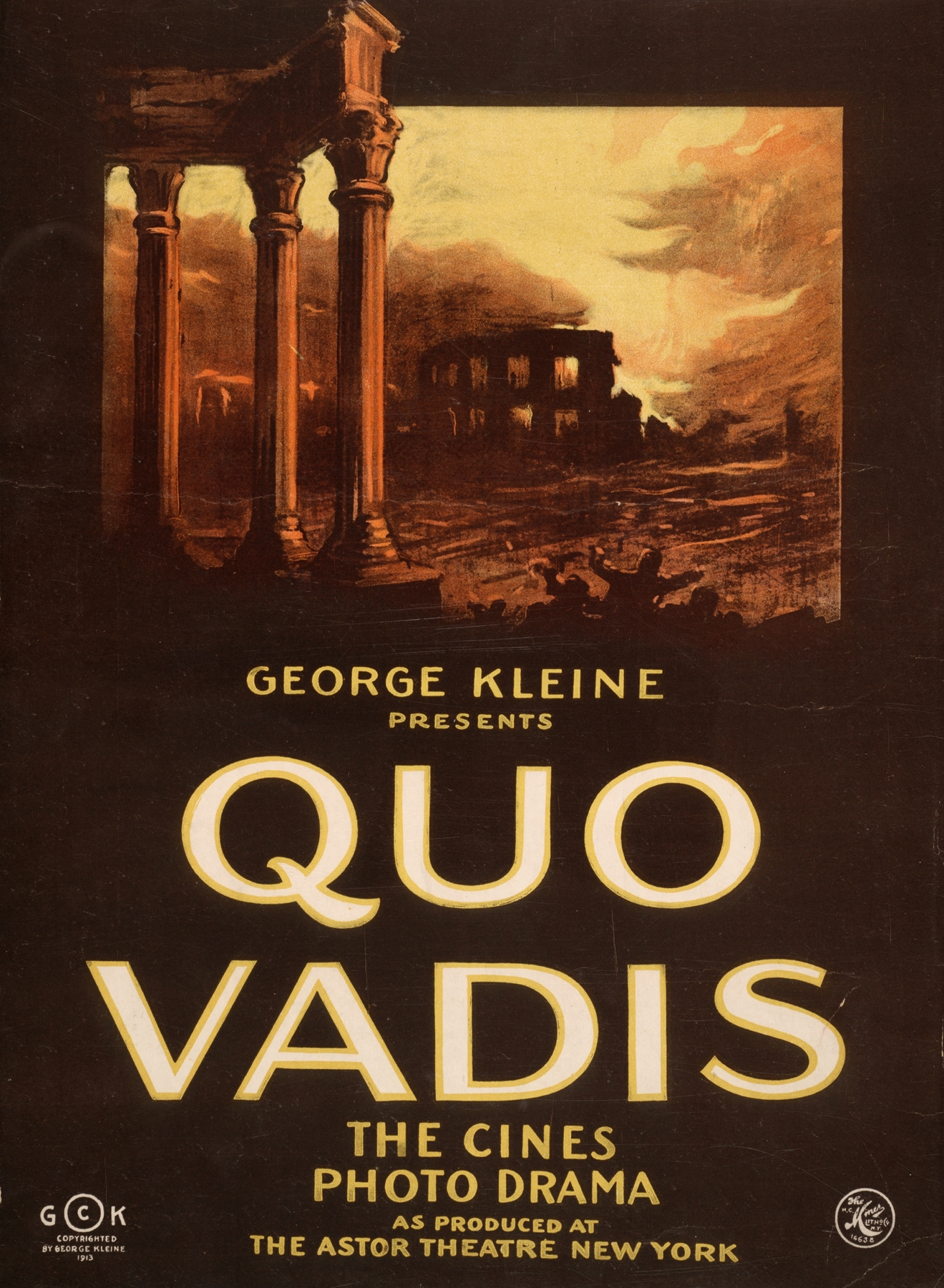
Poster for Quo Vadis? at Astor Theatre.

The movie that definitively brought Guazzoni, and Italian cinema in general, to the world's attention was Quo Vadis?, released in 1913 and based on the novel by Henryk Sienkiewicz. It was a highly demanding film, costing a significant sum for the time (between 45,000 and 60,000 lire). Based on a narrative that skilfully alternated between individual and group stories, it successfully transferred the novel's complex plot to the screen in full-length feature film format, employing a mature cinematic language. A distinctive feature of Quo Vadis? was its massive production scale, characterized by imposing architectural sets and a record-breaking number of extras (more than 5,000), which together created highly realistic crowd scenes. Guazzoni was the first filmmaker to address the issue of perspective. He moved away from the confining spaces of studios and successfully combined dramatic and cinematic scenes with theatrical elements.

Quo Vadis? is considered one of the first true blockbusters in the history of cinema. It was a huge international hit, with full orchestral accompaniment at screenings in major cities. The film premiered in Germany on the opening night of the Ufa-Pavillon am Nollendorfplatz in Berlin – the city's first purpose-built, free-standing cinema. The Royal Albert Hall in London was converted into a cinema for the film's first screening; it was also the first film to be shown at the Astor Theatre at Broadway, where it ran for nine months from April to December 1913. Guazzoni's sumptuous spectacle paved the way for the production of vast, epic historical films characterised by grandiosity and opulent scenery. With their enormous sets, thousands of extras and lengthy running times, these productions dominated the global market before World War I and deeply influenced early directors such as Cecil B. DeMille and D. W. Griffith.

== After Quo Vadis? ==
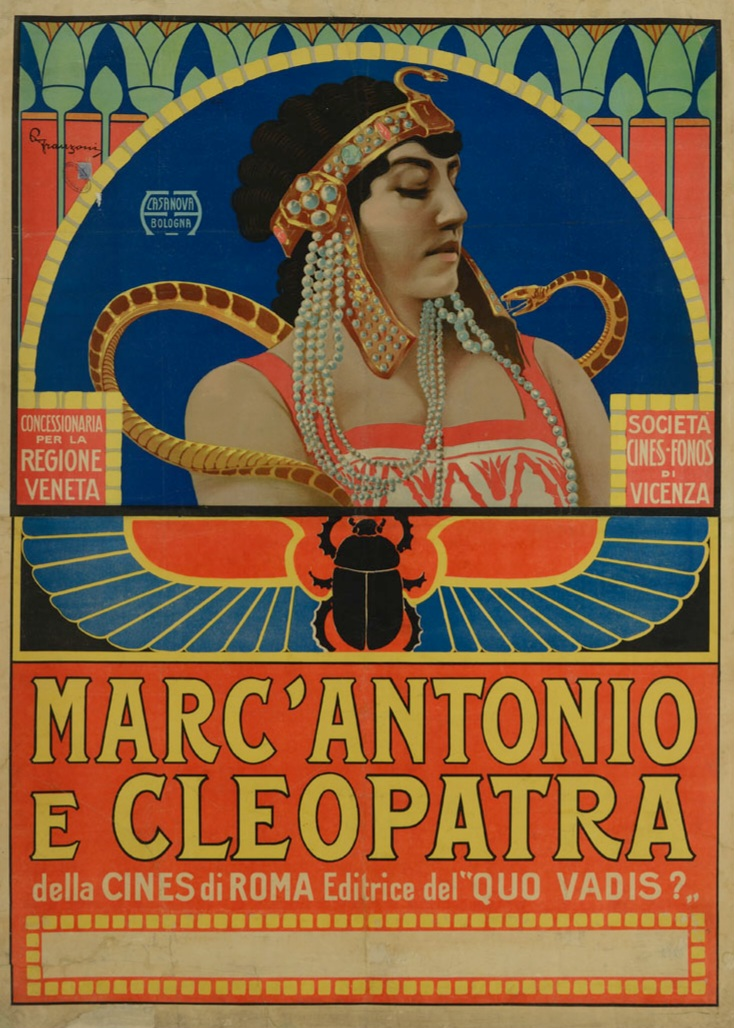
Poster advertising Guazzoni's Anthony and Cleopatra

Following Quo Vadis?, Guazzoni directed several successful historical movies, including Antony and Cleopatra (1913), Julius Caesar (1914) and Fabiola (1918), all starring Amleto Novelli and with sets designed by Guazzoni himself. These films reflect Guazzoni's commitment to grandiose sets, historical authenticity, and dramatic storytelling.

In 1918, Guazzoni founded his own production company, Guazzoni Film, which was based at Villa Massimo in Rome. For this company, he produced and directed several films, including Pagliaccio, The Gates of Death, The Hyena's Daughter, The Three Shadows, Arduino d'Ivrea and The Crusaders. These films starred Amleto Novelli and Elena Sangro. The following year, he produced the epic film The Sack of Rome. Messalina (1924), starring the diva Rina De Liguoro in the title role, was the last of Guazzoni's monumental historical movies.

Like many veterans of the silent era, Guazzoni struggled with the abrupt technological and stylistic shifts brought about by the advent of sound. Although he continued to work as a director, primarily of sentimental comedies and popular melodramas, his sound films did not enjoy the same international prestige or groundbreaking impact as his pre-World War I works. Guazzoni died in Rome on 23 September 1949.

== Selected filmography ==
=== Silent films ===
Year	Title	Preservation status
1911	Brutus	BFI National Archive and Cineteca del Friuli
1911	Agrippina	EYE Film Institute Netherlands
1913	Quo Vadis	Public domain
1913	Antony and Cleopatra	Public domain
1914	Julius Caesar	Public domain
1916	Madame Guillotine	Cineteca di Bologna and Cinémathèque française
1918	Fabiola	Public domain
1918	The Crusaders	Public domain; Centre national du cinéma et de l'image animée
1920	The Sack of Rome	Lost
1924	Messalina	Public domain
1929	Miryam	Lost

Sound films

Year	Title	Notes
1932	The Gift of the Morning	
1934	Lady of Paradise	
1935	The Joker King	
1936	King of Diamonds	
1936	The Two Sergeants	
1937	Doctor Antonio	
1937	I've Lost My Husband!	
1940	Antonio Meucci	
1940	The Daughter of the Green Pirate	
1941	Pirates of Malaya	Sequel of Giorgio Simonelli's The Two Tigers.
1942	Black Gold	
1942	The Lion of Damascus	Begun under the direction of Corrado D'Errico but completed by Guazzoni following his death.
1944	La Fornarina	

== Bibliography ==
- Elley, Derek (1984). The Epic Film: Myth and History. London: Routledge. ISBN 978-0710099938.
- Sorlin, Pierre (1996). Italian National Cinema 1896-1996. London: Routledge. ISBN 978-0415116985.
- Vacche, Angela Dalle (2008). Diva: Defiance and Passion in Early Italian Cinema. Austin: University of Texas Press. ISBN 978-0292717114.
- Moliterno, Gino (2009). The A to Z of Italian Cinema. Lanham, Maryland: Scarecrow Press. ISBN 978-0810870598.
