= Romolo Manissero =

Italian aviator

Romolo Manissero

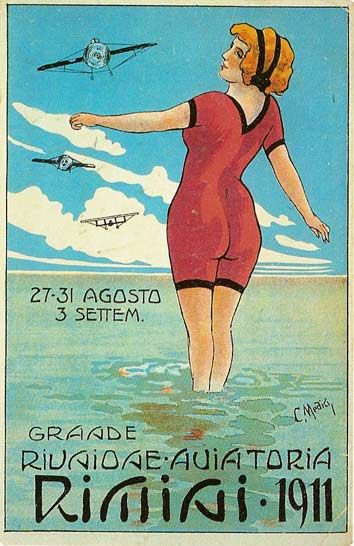
Poster for the 1911 Rimini air meeting.

Romolo Manissero (1882 - 19 May 1951) was an early Italian aviator who trained at the Berlioz school in Paris and was the first Italian to loop-the-loop.

== Early life ==
Romolo Manissero was born in Pocapaglia in the province of Cuneo in 1882.

== Aviation ==
He received his aviator's certificate from the Aéro-Club de France on 7 April 1911. He participated in the Italian air meeting at Rimini in August 1911 with Francesco Deroye and Carlo Maffei. On 31 August he made a flight with Lyda Borelli, a famous actress of the time, of 20 minutes in order to promote the event. On his next flight, alone, he was involved in an accident when his wheel clipped a rise in the airfield and he suffered serious cerebral and abdominal injuries and broke his jaw. The accident led to the early cancellation of the meeting. He suffered from the after-effects of his injuries for the rest of his life. He was later involved in aircraft manufacture in Italy and military aviation.
