= Agrippina (film) =

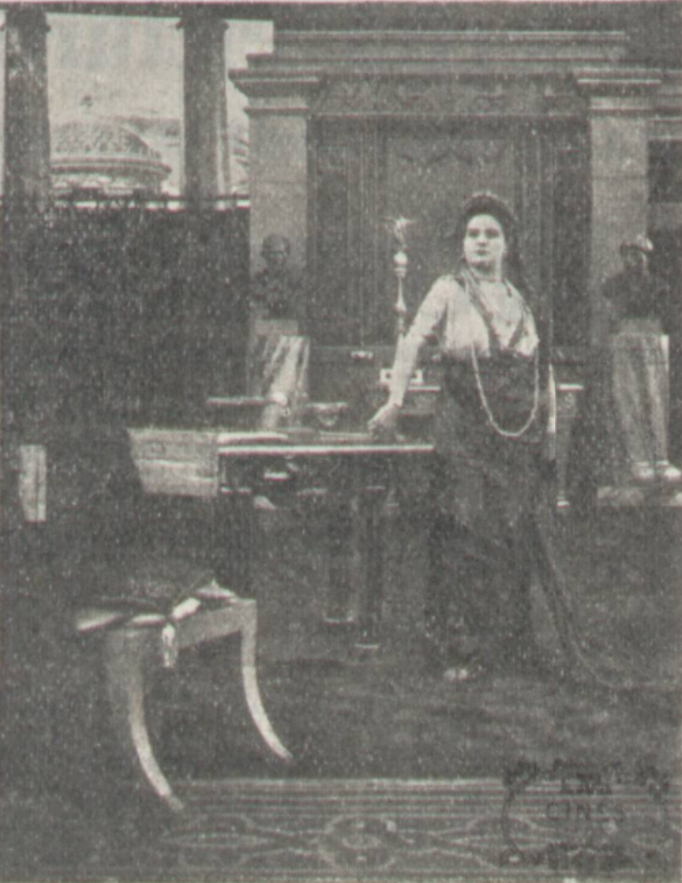
- Directed by: Enrico Guazzoni
- Written by: Enrico Guazzoni
- Starring: Adele Bianchi Azzarili; Amleto Novelli; Maria Caserini
- Production company: Società Italiana Cines
- Distributed by: Società Italiana Cines
- Release date: 7 January 1911
- Running time: 19 min.
- Country: Italy
- Languages: Silent; Italian intertitles

Agrippina is a 1911 Italian silent historical film directed by Enrico Guazzoni and starring Adele Bianchi Azzarili, Amleto Novelli and Maria Caserini. The film portrays the life of Agrippina the Younger, and was part of the move towards Roman epics in early Italian cinema.

== Cast ==
- Adele Bianchi Azzarili
- Cesare Moltini
- Maria Caserini
- Giovanni Dolfini
- Amleto Novelli

== Bibliography ==
- Moliterno, Gino (2009). The A to Z of Italian Cinema. Lanham, Maryland: Scarecrow Press. ISBN 978-0810870598.
