= Antony and Cleopatra (1913 film) =

1913 film by Enrico Guazzoni

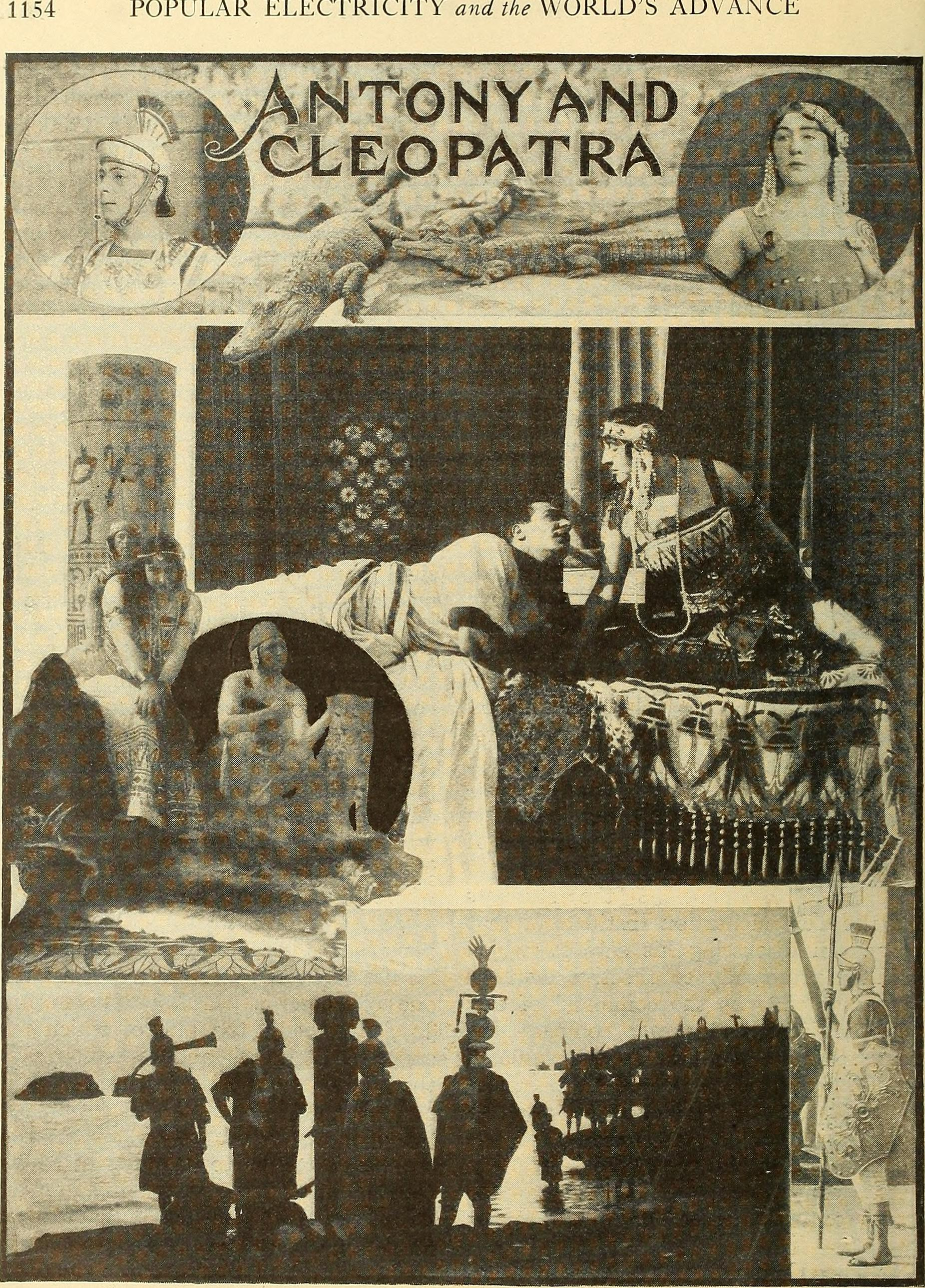
- Advertisement in the Popular Electricity magazine
- Directed by: Enrico Guazzoni
- Written by: William Shakespeare (play); Pietro Cossa (poem)
- Starring: Gianna Terribili-Gonzales; Amleto Novelli; Ignazio Lupi
- Cinematography: Alessandro Bona
- Production company: Società Italiana Cines
- Distributed by: Società Italiana Cines
- Release dates: 14 August 1913 (Germany); 5 January 1914 (USA)
- Running time: 11 reels, 120 mins. (edited to 8 reels, 73 mins. in U.S.).
- Country: Italy
- Languages: Silent; Italian intertitles

Antony and Cleopatra (Italian: Marc'Antonio e Cleopatra) is a 1913 Italian silent historical film directed by Enrico Guazzoni, starring Gianna Terribili-Gonzales, Amleto Novelli and Ignazio Lupi.

The film nods towards William Shakespeare's play of the same title, with inspiration drawn from Plutarch's Parallel Lives (Demetrius and Antony); the play or dramatic poem Cleopatra (1879), in Italian by Pietro Cossa; and the German novel Cleopatra by Georg Ebers (1893).

The film was distributed in Germany from August 1913 as Die Herrin des Nils—Cleopatra, and in the U.S. by George Kleine as Antony and Cleopatra from January 1914. The film still exists today.

== Cast ==
- Gianna Terribili-Gonzales as Cleopatra
- Amleto Novelli as Marc Antony
- Ignazio Lupi as Augustus Caesar Octavian
- Elsa Lenard as Octavia (Antony's wife and Octavian's sister)
- Matilde Di Marzio as the slave Hagar (named Charmian in the US version)
- Ruffo Geri as the Chief of the plotters
- Ida Carloni Talli as the Witch of the oracle
- Bruto Castellani
- Giuseppe Piemontesi

== Historical background ==
After the assassination of Julius Caesar in 44 BC, the Second Triumvirate was formed by Mark Antony, Octavian, and Marcus Lepidus. After the Battle of Phillipi against Caesar's killers (the Liberatores), the control of Rome's Eastern provinces including the client kingdom of Ptolemaic Egypt fell to Mark Antony, Caesar's nephew. Antony was married to Octavia, Octavian's sister. Egypt was ruled by the beautiful and seductive Cleopatra VII, with whom Antony fell hopelessly in love and fathered several children. A rivalry grew up between him and Octavian, who instigated a war, ostensibly against Cleopatra, since Antony was a true Roman (Latin: civis romanus). Defeated, Antony and Cleopatra separately committed suicide.

== Synopsis ==
The film opens with Antony arriving in Egypt to arrest Cleopatra for her rebellion against Rome: however he falls for her charms and they fall in love. Antony's wife Octavia, the sister of Octavian, arrives and jealously accuses Cleopatra for her illicit relationship with Antony. Egyptian nobles plot against Rome. The Roman senate denounces Antony as a traitor. Octavian's legions arrive. The naval Battle of Actium (31 BC) takes place in which Octavian wins a crushing victory over Antony's ships and the Egyptian forces. (In the film the action is transferred to the River Nile, rather than the Ionian Sea off the west coast of Greece where it historically took place.) The pair flee to Alexandria which is besieged. Panic ensues, and Antony commits suicide. Cleopatra still hopes to win the heart of Octavian, the conqueror, but he declares her a prisoner and must go with him to Rome. Unable to bear the humiliation of a triumphal procession with her in chains, Cleopatra commits suicide by an asp bite.

== Production ==
The opening credits of the US version state that the film was staged in Italy and Egypt. The cinematographer, Alessandro Bona, was previously behind the camera for Quo Vadis, also directed by Guazzoni.

== Release ==
In Germany, a press showing of Die Herrin des Nils–Cleopatra took place on 14 August 1913 at the Ufa-Pavillon am Nollendorfplatz, Berlin (at the time named the Cines Nollendorf Theater.) The audience included "other interested parties". The audience, including critics from de:Berliner Neuesten Nachrichten, de:Berliner Lokalanzeiger, Die Wahrheit, and de:Berliner Volkszeitung, seemed to be unanimous in their spontaneous applause. The Nollendorfplatz cinema, the first free-standing, purpose-built film theatre in the capital, was built by Joe Golsdoll and A. H. Woods, Cines' representatives in Germany and owners of Cines film rights. The cinema had opened in March that year with another Cines historical blockbuster, Quo Vadis, also directed by Guazzoni. Antony and Cleopatra was still running in December, after nearly 200 performances.

A competing film with a confusingly similar title (Cleopatra, die Beherrscherin des Nils) and subject matter was released in September by the Rheinisch-Westfälischen Filmzentrale company in Bochum. The 1912 US film Cleopatra starring Helen Gardner was also released in Germany in September 1913.

The film was released somewhere on 26 September 1913.

== Reception ==
An anonymous critic writing in the German trade journal de:Lichtbild-Bühne was very positive:

In the program booklet, this film is described by the Cines-Gesellschaft as "The most magnificent cinematic painting in the world," a promise that is quite high. — Since the film industry has recently been using all sorts of buzzwords, the public has become desensitized to them. All the more pleasant, then, that this announcement did not disappoint us. As with Quo Vadis, the subject of this film is also classical; it depicts a piece of ancient Roman history. The actors' figures are magnificent: Cleopatra, Queen of Egypt, a voluptuous, fiery figure; Marc Antony, Triumvir of the Roman Republic, and his brother-in-law, Octavius, are classically magnificent figures; Octavia, the wife of Mark Antony, a refined, almost delicate Roman woman, as depicted by ancient artists, and Hagar, Cleopatra's courageous slave [Charmian in the US version], is a southern beauty with sparkling eyes.
The film is extraordinarily rich in gripping, lavishly staged crowd scenes; we witness spectacular festivals with fairytale splendor and truly oriental luxury, and powerful images of war sweep before us. The image in which the Roman legions creep along the blue sea at dusk is overwhelming. [The copy seems to have been tinted.] The great procession of warriors along the banks of the Nile (filmed from a bird's-eye view by the director) has such a magnificent effect, never before seen in film, that the audience, which had remained rather cold until then, involuntarily and spontaneously bursts into applause.
This unsurpassed picturesque effect of that colossal scene is an unforgettable delight for the aesthete and artistically sensuous layman. This one scene alone makes it worthwhile to see the two-hour film. The battle scenes that develop afterward are also of great effect. Fire and sword wreak havoc. "Vae victis" echoes through the room; "Woe to the vanquished!" — Marc Antony, as a defeated and true Roman, plunges his sword into his heart, and when the proud Cleopatra receives news that she is to end her life as a slave, she presses the poisonous viper to her breast and collapses lifeless onto the ottoman.
The burning of Alexandria also leaves a profound impression; in the foreground, the desperate struggle of thousands, and in the background, the burning city—a sight that compels even the greatest cinema critic to pay tribute to the art of film."

== Film status ==
A copy of the complete US version is available on Archive.org with English intertitles.

== Sources ==
- Hatchuel, Sarah & Vienne-Guerrin, Nathalie. Shakespeare on Screen: The Roman Plays. Publication Univ Rouen Havre, 2009.
