= Matilde Di Marzio =

Italian film actress

- Occupation: Actress
- Years active: 1913–1921 (film)

Matilde Di Marzio was an Italian film actress of the silent era. She appeared in twenty seven films between 1913 and 1921, including Antony and Cleopatra (1913).

== Selected filmography ==
- Antony and Cleopatra (1913)
- Ivan the Terrible (1917)

== Bibliography ==
- Hatchuel, Sarah; Vienne-Guerrin, Nathalie (2009). Shakespeare on Screen: The Roman Plays. Presses universitaires de Rouen et du Havre. ISBN 978-2-87775-478-1.
