= Alfredo Lenci =

Italian cinematographer

- Born: 1873; Rome, Lazio; Italy
- Died: 1959 (aged 85–86); Rome, Lazio; Italy
- Occupation: Cinematographer

Alfredo Lenci (1873–1959) was an Italian cinematographer. After working as a cinematographer on a number of historical epics during the silent era, Lenci was later employed by the state-owned Istituto Luce on documentary and propaganda films such as Black Shirt (1933).

== Selected filmography ==
- Fabiola (1918)
- The Crusaders (1918)
- A Dying Nation (1922)
- Messalina (1924)
- Black Shirt (1933)

== Bibliography ==
- Poppi, Roberto. I film: Tutti i film italiani dal 1930 al 1944. Gremese Editore, 2005. ISBN 978-88-8440-351-3.
