= Elena Sangro =

Italian actress (1897–1969)

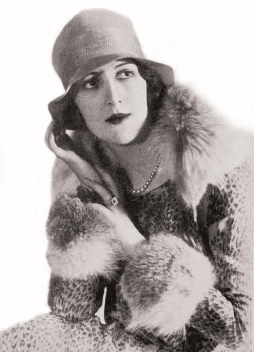
- Born: Maria Antonietta Bartoli Avveduti; 5 September 1897; Vasto, Abruzzo, Kingdom of Italy
- Died: 26 January 1969 (aged 71); Rome, Lazio, Italy
- Occupation: Actress
- Years active: 1918–1951

Elena Sangro (born Maria Antonietta Bartoli Avveduti; 5 September 1897 – 26 January 1969) was an Italian actress.

== Selected filmography ==
- The Crusaders (1918)
- Fabiola (1918)
- Samson (1923)
- Emperor Maciste (1924)
- Pleasure Train (1924)
- Quo Vadis? (1924)
- Maciste in the Lion's Cage (1926)
- Goodbye Youth (1927)
- Villa Falconieri (1928)
- L'abito nero da sposa (1945)
- The Young Caruso (1951)

== Bibliography ==
- Vacche, Angela Dalle. Diva: Defiance and Passion in Early Italian Cinema. University of Texas Press, 2008.
