= The Wedding March (1934 film) =

- Directed by: Mario Bonnard
- Written by: Henry Bataille (play); Guido Cantini; Mario Bonnard
- Produced by: Pietro Mander
- Starring: Tullio Carminati; Cesare Bettarini; Assia Noris
- Cinematography: Ubaldo Arata
- Edited by: Giuseppe Fatigati
- Music by: Giulio Bonnard
- Production companies: Mander Film; Paris-Rome Films
- Distributed by: Mander Film
- Release date: 1934
- Running time: 92 minutes
- Country: Italy
- Language: Italian

The Wedding March (Italian: La marcia nuziale) is a 1934 Italian comedy film directed by Mario Bonnard and starring Tullio Carminati, Cesare Bettarini, and Assia Noris. The film's sets were designed by the art director Gastone Medin. A French-language version titled La marche nuptiale with Madeleine Renaud was also released in 1935.

== Cast ==
- Kiki Palmer as Grazia de Plessans
- Tullio Carminati as Ruggero Lechatelier
- Cesare Bettarini as Claudio Morillot
- Diana Lante as Susanna Lechatelier
- Assia Noris as Signora Clozières
- Nella Maria Bonora as Amata
- Enrico Viarisio as Cesare
- Mercedes Brignone as Signora de Plessans
- Lamberto Picasso as L'editore
- Cesare Zoppetti as Sig. de Plessans
- Ferruccio Ermini as Sig. de Saussy
- Oreste Bilancia as L'albergatore

== See also ==
- The Wedding March (1915)
- The Wedding March (1929)

== Bibliography ==
- Goble, Alan. The Complete Index to Literary Sources in Film. Walter de Gruyter, 1999.
