= The Wedding March (1915 film) =

1915 film directed by Carmine Gallone

- Directed by: Carmine Gallone
- Written by: Henry Bataille (play); Carmine Gallone
- Starring: Lyda Borelli
- Cinematography: Domenico Grimaldi
- Release date: 26 November 1915
- Country: Italy
- Language: Silent

The Wedding March (Italian: La marcia nuziale) is a 1915 silent Italian drama film directed by Carmine Gallone.

== Cast ==
- Lyda Borelli as Grazia di Plessans
- Francesco Cacace as Ruggero Lechatelier
- Wanda Capodaglio
- Angelo Gallina
- Leda Gys as Susanna Lechatelier
- Amleto Novelli as Claudio Morillot

== See also ==
- The Wedding March (1929)
- The Wedding March (1934)
