= Amleto Novelli =

Italian silent film actor

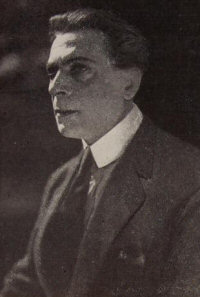
- Born: 18 October 1885; Bologna, Italy
- Died: 16 April 1924 (aged 38); Turin, Italy
- Occupation: Actor
- Years active: 1909–1924

Amleto Novelli (18 October 1885 – 16 April 1924) was an Italian film actor of the silent era. He appeared in 110 films between 1909 and 1924.

== Selected filmography ==
- Brutus (1911)
- Agrippina (1911)
- Quo Vadis (1913)
- Antony and Cleopatra (1913)
- Julius Caesar (1914)
- The Wedding March (1915)
- Avatar (1916)
- Malombra (1917)
- Ivan the Terrible (1917)
- Fabiola (1918)
- The Crusaders (1918)
- The Railway Owner (1919)
- The Shadow (1920)
- Zingari (1920)
- The Prey (1921)
- Red Love (1921)
- The House of Pulcini (1924)
- Marco Visconti (1925)
