= Nicholas Wiseman =

English Catholic cardinal (1802–1865)

His Eminence Nicholas Patrick Stephen Wiseman
- Cardinal, Archbishop of Westminster
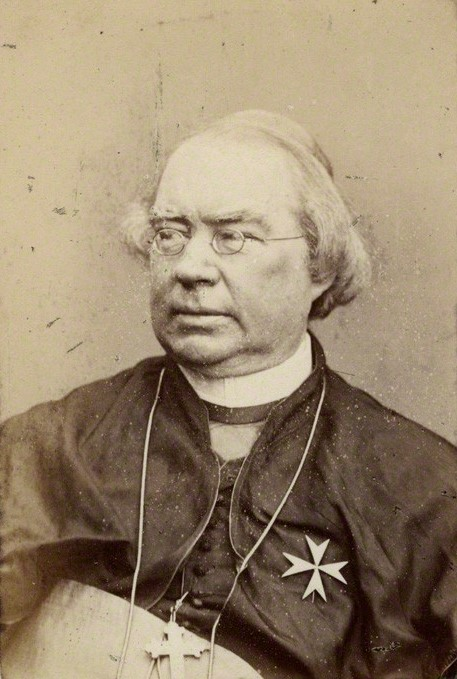
- Photograph c. 1860s
- Province: Westminster
- Diocese: Westminster
- Appointed: 29 August 1847 (Coadjutor Vicar Apostolic)
- Installed: 29 September 1850
- Term ended: 15 February 1865
- Predecessor: Thomas Walsh (as Vicar Apostolic)
- Successor: Henry Edward Manning
- Other post: Cardinal-Priest of Santa Pudenziana
- Previous posts: Vicar Apostolic of the Midland District (1840–1847); Titular Bishop of Milopotamos (1840–1850); Coadjutor Vicar Apostolic of the Central District (1840–1847); Apostolic Administrator of Southwark (1850–1851)

Orders
- Ordination: 19 March 1825
- Consecration: 8 June 1840 by Giacomo Filippo Fransoni
- Created cardinal: 30 September 1850 by Pius IX
- Rank: Cardinal-Priest

Personal details
- Born: Nicolás Patricio Esteban Wiseman; 3 August 1802 Seville, Spain
- Died: 15 February 1865 (aged 62) York Place, Portman Square, London, England
- Buried: Westminster Cathedral
- Denomination: Catholic
- Parents: James Wiseman and Xaviera Wiseman (née Strange)
- Coat of arms

Styles of Nicholas Wiseman
- Reference style: His Eminence
- Spoken style: Your Eminence
- Informal style: Cardinal

Nicholas Patrick Stephen Wiseman (3 August 1802 – 15 February 1865) was an English Catholic prelate who served as the first Archbishop of Westminster upon the re-establishment of the Catholic hierarchy in England and Wales in 1850. He was made a cardinal in 1850.

Born in Seville to Irish parents, Wiseman was educated at a school in Waterford before attending St Cuthbert's College, Ushaw. He subsequently went to the English College in Rome, where he subsequently became Rector. While in Rome, he was assigned to preach to the English Catholics there. As Rector, he was the representative of the English bishops. During a visit to England in 1836, he helped initiate the periodical Dublin Review. In 1840, he was appointed president of Oscott College.

== Early life ==
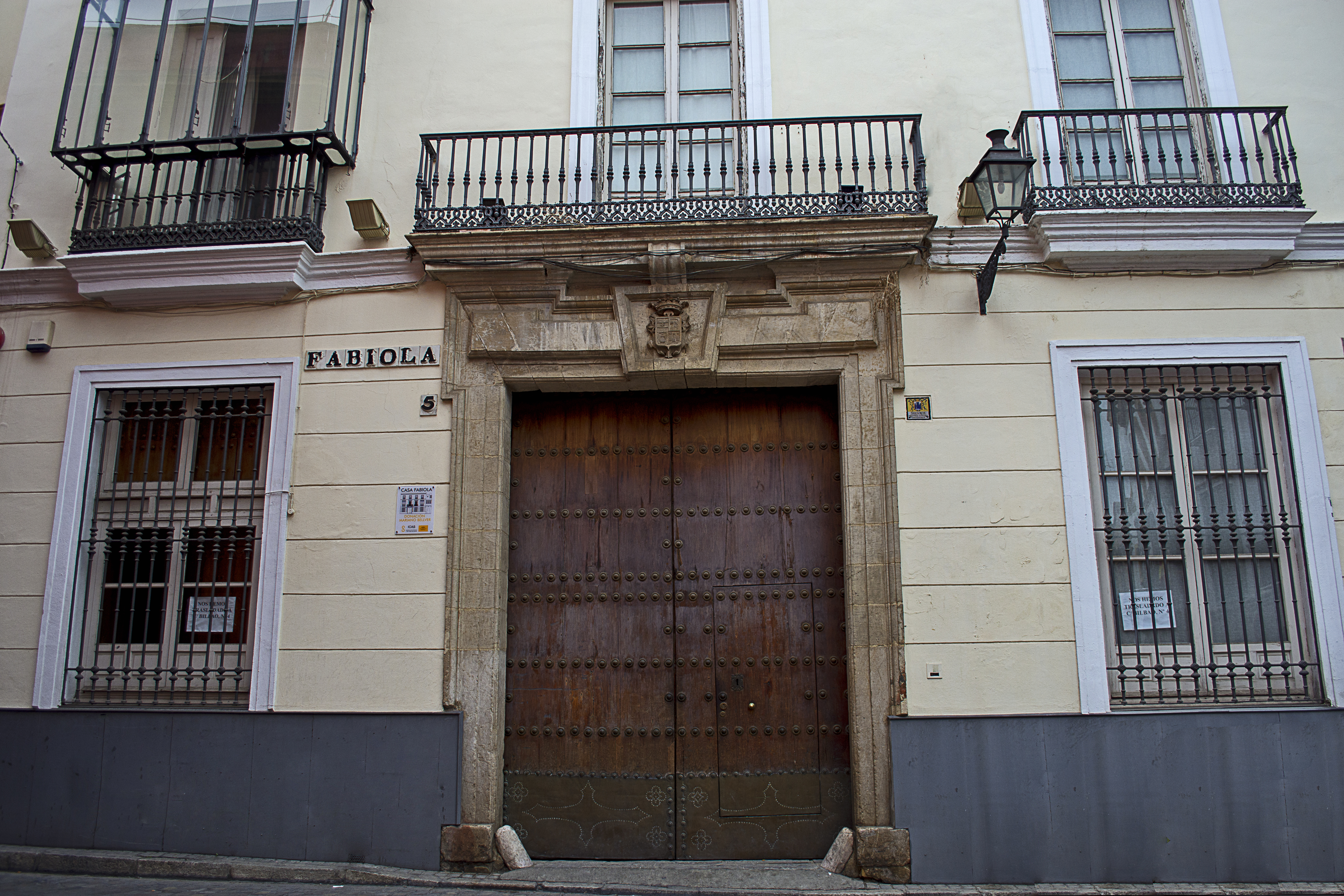
Birthplace of Cardinal Wiseman, 5 Calle Fabiola, Seville, Spain

Wiseman was born in Seville on 2 February 1802, the younger son of merchant James Wiseman and his second wife, Xaviera (née Strange), of Waterford, Ireland, who had settled in Spain for business. On his father's death in 1805, he was brought to his parents' home in Waterford. In 1810, he was sent to Ushaw College, near Durham, where he was educated until the age of sixteen. Wiseman would later recall that John Lingard, Vice-President of the college at the time, showed the quiet, retiring boy much kindness. In 1818, Wiseman proceeded to the English College in Rome, which had reopened in 1818 after being closed by the Napoleonic Wars for twenty years. He graduated with a doctorate of theology with distinction in July 1824, and was ordained to the priesthood 10 March 1825.

He was appointed vice-rector of the English College in 1827, and rector in 1828, although he was not yet twenty-six years of age. He had this office until 1840. From the first a devoted student and scholar of antiquity, he devoted much time to the examination of Oriental manuscripts in the Vatican Library, and a first volume, entitled Horae Syriacae, published in 1827, showed that he had promise as a good scholar.

Pope Leo XII (r. 1823–1829) appointed him curator of the Arabic manuscripts in the Vatican, and professor of Oriental languages in the Roman University. His academic life was, however, interrupted by the pope's command to preach to English residents of Rome. A course of his lectures, On the Connexion between Science and Revealed Religion, attracted much attention. His general thesis was that whereas scientific teaching had repeatedly been thought to disprove Christian doctrine, further investigation has shown that reconciliation is possible. It is much to Wiseman's credit that his lectures on the relationship between religion and science were approved by a critic as stern as Andrew Dickson White. In his extremely influential A History of the Warfare of Science with Theology in Christendom, the primary contention of which was the conflict thesis, White wrote that "it is a duty and a pleasure to state here that one great Christian scholar did honour to religion and to himself by quietly accepting the claims of science and making the best of them.... That man was Nicholas Wiseman, better known afterward as Cardinal Wiseman. The conduct of this pillar of the Church contrasts admirably with that of timid Protestants, who were filling England with shrieks and denunciations".

== England ==
Wiseman visited England during 1835–1836 and delivered lectures on the principles and main doctrines of Catholicism in the Sardinian Chapel, Lincoln's Inn Fields, and in the church in Moorfields. The effect of his lectures was considerable. At Edward Bouverie Pusey's request, John Henry Newman reviewed them in the periodical British Critic during December 1836, treating them for the most part with sympathy as a triumph over popular Protestantism. To another critic, who had claimed a resemblance between Catholic and pagan ceremonies, Wiseman replied admitting the likeness, and saying that it could be shown equally well to exist between Christian and non-Christian doctrines.

In 1836, Wiseman initiated the periodical Dublin Review, partly to give English Catholics greater ideals for their religion and enthusiasm for the papacy, and partly to deal with the Oxford Movement. In 1916 the name was changed to the Wiseman Review. At this date he was already distinguished as a scholar and critic, fluent in many languages, and informed on questions of scientific, artistic or historical interest.

An article by Wiseman on the Donatist schism, appearing in the Dublin Review in July 1839, made an impression in Oxford, Newman and others seeing the analogy between Donatists and Anglicans. Wiseman, preaching at the opening of St Mary's Church, Derby, in the same year, anticipated Newman's argument on religious development, published six years later. In 1840, he was consecrated bishop, and was sent to England as coadjutor to Bishop Thomas Walsh, vicar-apostolic of the Central district, and was also appointed president of Oscott College near Birmingham.

Oscott, during his presidency, became a centre for English Catholics. The Oxford converts (1845 and later) added to Wiseman's responsibilities, as many of them found themselves wholly without means, while the old Catholic body looked on the newcomers with distrust. It was by his advice that Newman and his companions spent some time in Rome before undertaking clerical work in England. Soon after the accession of Pope Pius IX, Bishop Walsh was assigned to be vicar-apostolic of the London district with Wiseman still as his coadjutor. For Wiseman, the appointment became permanent on Walsh's death in February 1849.

On his arrival from Rome in 1847, Wiseman acted as an informal diplomatic envoy from the pope, to ascertain from the government what assistance England was likely to give in implementing the liberal policy with which Pius inaugurated his reign. In response, Lord Minto was sent to Rome as "an authentic organ of the British Government", but the policy in question proved abortive. Residing in London in Golden Square, Wiseman threw himself into his new duties with many-sided activities, working especially for the reclamation of Catholic criminals and for the restoration of the lapsed poor to the practice of their religion. He was zealous for the establishment of religious communities, both of men and women, and for performing retreats and missions. He preached on 4 July 1848 at the opening of St George's, Southwark, an occasion unique in England since the Reformation, 14 bishops and 240 priests being present, and six religious orders of men being represented.

== Cardinal ==
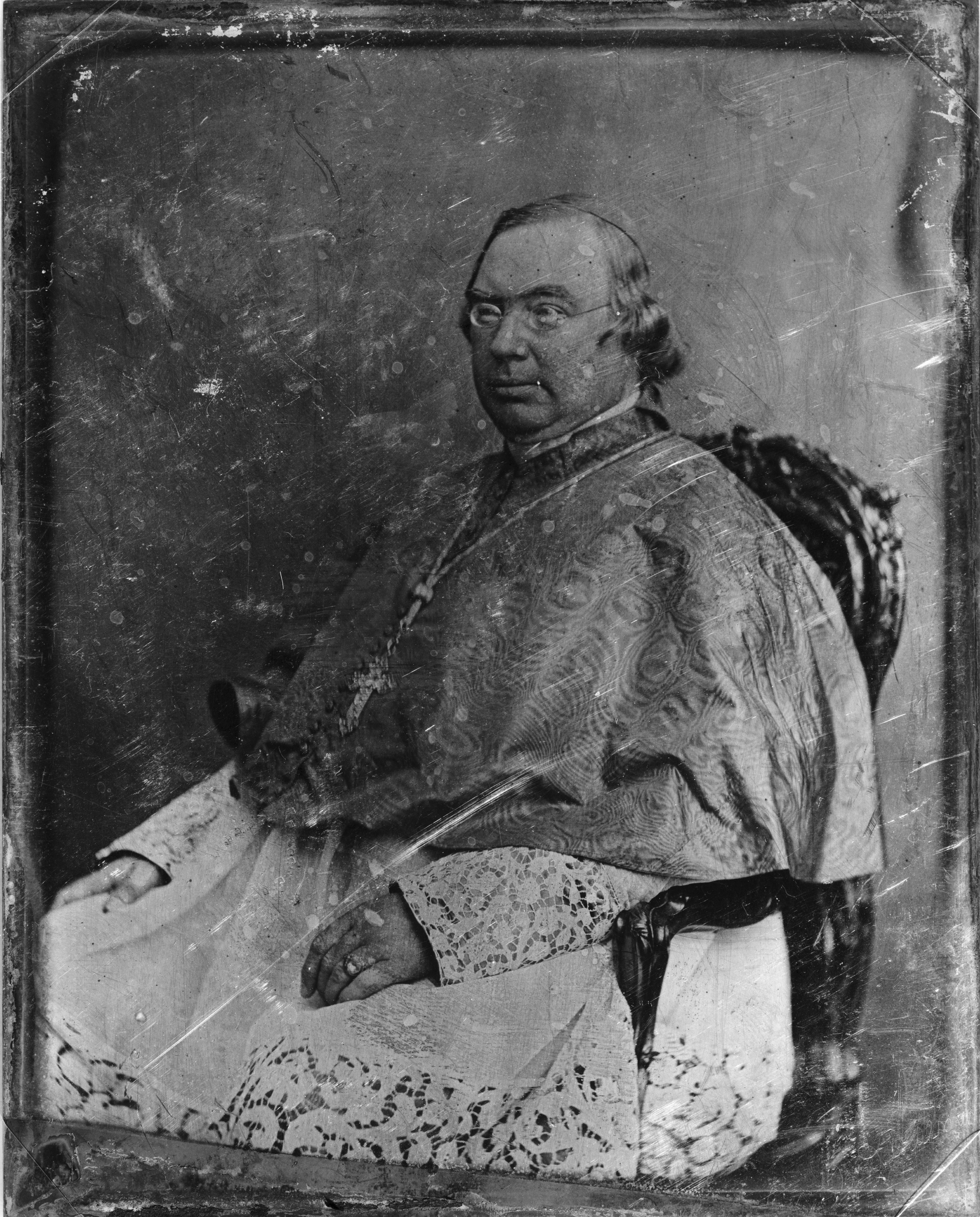
Cardinal Wiseman, daguerreotype by Mathew Brady studio

Wiseman found himself opposed by some of his clergy who disliked his ultramontane ideas of his "Romanizing and innovating zeal", especially in revivals of ritual. In July 1850, Wiseman heard of the pope's intention to create him a cardinal. Arriving at Rome, he found that the Pope wanted him to return to England as Cardinal and Archbishop of Westminster. The papal brief Universalis Ecclesiae was dated 29 September 1850, and Wiseman wrote a pastoral from Rome on 7 October, in which he said "Catholic England has been restored to its orbit in the ecclesiastical firmament, from which its light had long vanished". (Note: From body of pastoral letter.)

Wiseman travelled slowly to England, via Vienna. When he reached London on 11 November, the whole country was ablaze with indignation at the "papal aggression," which was interpreted to imply a new and unjustifiable claim to territorial rule. Some indeed feared that his life was endangered by the violence of popular feeling. Wiseman displayed calmness and courage, and immediately penned a pamphlet of over 30 pages titled Appeal to the English People, in which he explained the nature of the pope's action. He argued that the admitted principle of toleration included leave to establish a diocesan hierarchy. In his concluding paragraphs, he effectively contrasted that dominion over Westminster, which he was taunted with claiming, with his duties towards the poor Catholics resident there, with which alone he was really concerned. A course of lectures at St George's, Southwark, further moderated the storm. In July 1852, he presided at St Mary's College, Oscott over the first provincial synod of Westminster, at which Newman preached his sermon on the "Second Spring"; and at this date, Wiseman's dream of the rapid conversion of England to the ancient faith seemed capable of realisation. But many difficulties with his own people shortly beset his path, due largely to the suspicions aroused by his evident preference for the ardent Roman zeal of the converts, and especially of Manning, to the dull and cautious formalism of the old Catholics.

During the autumn of 1853, Wiseman went to Rome, where Pius IX gave full approval to his ecclesiastical policy. It was during this visit to Rome that Wiseman projected, and began to write, the most popular book that he ever wrote, the historical romance, Fabiola, a tale of the Church of the Catacombs. The book was published at the end of 1854, and its success was immediate and phenomenal. Translations of it were published in almost every European language. Wiseman wrote Fabiola in part as an answer to the vigorously anti-Catholic book Hypatia (1853) by Charles Kingsley. The novel was mainly intended the aid the embattled Catholic minority in England.

The year 1854 was also marked by Wiseman's presence in Rome at the definition of the dogma of the Immaculate Conception of the Blessed Virgin on 8 December.

In 1855, Wiseman applied for a coadjutor bishop. George Errington, who was then Bishop of Plymouth and his friend since boyhood, was appointed Coadjutor Archbishop of Westminster and Titular Archbishop of Trapezus. Two years later, Manning was appointed Provost of Westminster. During Wiseman's later years Errington was hostile to Manning, and to himself insofar as he was supposed to be influenced by Manning. The story of the estrangement, which was largely a matter of temperament, is told in Ward's biography. In July 1860 Errington was deprived by the Pope of his coadjutorship with right of succession. He retired to Prior Park, near Bath, where he died in 1886.

Wiseman's speeches, sermons and lectures, delivered during his tour, were printed in a volume of 400 pages, showing an extraordinary power of speaking with sympathy and tact. He was able to use considerable influence with English politicians, partly because in his time English Catholics were wavering in their historical allegiance to the Liberal party. He was in a position to secure concessions that bettered the condition of Catholics in regard to poor schools, reformatories and workhouses, and in the status of their army chaplains. In 1863, addressing the Catholic Congress in Mechelen, he stated that since 1830 the number of priests in England had increased from 434 to 1242, and of convents of women from 16 to 162, while there were no religious houses of men in 1830 and 55 in 1863. The last two years of his life were troubled by illness and by controversies in which he found himself, by Manning's influence, compelled to adopt a policy less liberal than that which had been his during earlier years.

Wiseman had to condemn the Association for the Promotion of the Unity of Christendom, with which he had shown some sympathy at its inception during 1857, and to forbid Catholic parents to send their sons to Oxford or Cambridge, though at an earlier date he had hoped (with Newman) that at Oxford at least a college or hall might be assigned to them. In other respects, however, his last years were cheered by marks of general regard and admiration, in which non-Catholics joined. After his death on 16 February 1865, there was an extraordinary demonstration of popular respect as his body was taken from St Mary's, Moorfields, to St Mary's Catholic Cemetery in Kensal Green, where it was intended that it should rest only until a more appropriate place could be found in a Catholic cathedral church of Westminster. On 30 January 1907, the body was removed with great ceremony from Kensal Green and was reburied in the crypt of the new cathedral, where it lies beneath a Gothic altar tomb, with a recumbent effigy of the archbishop in full pontificals.

Wiseman's birthplace on Calle Fabiola in Barrio Santa Cruz, the old Jewish part of Seville, features a commemorative plaque, as does Etloe House in Leyton, London E10, where he lived from 1858 to 1864.

== Artistic recognition ==
Wiseman was sculpted by Christopher Moore during 1853.

In Robert Browning's 1855 poem "Bishop Blougram's Apology", the speaker, a somewhat hypocritical English Catholic cleric, is based on Wiseman.

== Schools ==
Several schools have been named after Wiseman, including:

- The Cardinal Wiseman Catholic School, Greenford, a high school located in Greenford, West London. It was originally opened in 1959 as a special agreement school catering for 456 boys and girls aged 11–15 years.
- Cardinal Wiseman Catholic School, Birmingham, a Catholic secondary school, in Birmingham, England.
- Cardinal Wiseman Catholic School, Coventry, a Catholic secondary school in Coventry, England.

== Works ==
- Daily Meditations by Cardinal Wiseman
- The Real Presence of the Body and Blood of Our Lord Jesus Christ in the Blessed Eucharist, Proved from Scripture. In Eight Lectures, Delivered in the English College, Rome
- Twelve Lectures on the Connection between Science and Revealed Religion. Delivered in Rome
- Lectures on the Principal Doctrines and Practices of the Catholic Church. Delivered at St. Mary's, Moorfields, during the Lent of 1836
- The Catholic Doctrine on the Use of the Bible. Being a Review of His Grace Archbishop Dixon's "Catholic Introduction to Scripture" (1852)
- Fabiola or The Church of the Catacombs (1854)
- Essays on Various Subjects in Six Volumes. Vol 1
- Essays on Various Subjects in Six Volumes. Vol 2
- Sermons on Our Lord Jesus Christ and on His Blessed Mother
- Sermons on Moral Subjects
- Wiseman, Nicholas (1864). Judging from the past and present . London: John Murray.

== Sources ==
- Anon (2019). "Wiseman, Nicholas Patrick, 1802-1865". Library of Congress.
- Diamond, Michael (2003). Victorian sensation, or, The Spectacular, the Shocking, and the Scandalous in Nineteenth-century Britain. London, UK: Anthem Press. ISBN 1843310767. LCCN 2003446248.
- Fothergill, Brian (2013) [1963]. Nicholas Wiseman. London, UK: Faber & Faber. ISBN 9780571307258.
- Gunnis, Rupert (1953). Dictionary of British Sculptors 1660–1851. London, UK: Odhams Press. LCCN 53003647. OCLC 684045.
- Hunter-Blair, Oswald (1912). "Catholic Encyclopedia: Nicholas Patrick Wiseman". www.newadvent.org. New York, NY: Robert Appleton Company.
- Miranda, Salvador (2009). "Nicholas Wiseman". The Cardinals of the Holy Roman Church. Archived from the original on 9 October 2009.
- Morrin, Olive (13 February 2015). "Cardinal Wiseman at Maynooth". libfocus.
- Uffelman, Larry K. (June 1986). "Kingsley's Hypatia: Revisions in Context". Nineteenth-Century Literature. 41 (1). Oakland, CA: University of California Press: 87–96. doi:10.2307/3045056. JSTOR 3045056.
- Watson, J. R.; Hornby, Emma, eds. (2013). "Nicholas Wiseman". The Canterbury Dictionary of Hymnology. Norwich, UK: Canterbury Press. OCLC 862965143.
- Wheeler, Michael (2006). The Old Enemies: Catholic and Protestant in Nineteenth-century English Culture. Cambridge, UK: Cambridge University Press. ISBN 0521828104. LCCN 2005018619.
- White, Andrew Dickson (1896). "V: From Genesis to Geology". A History of the Warfare of Science with Theology in Christendom. New York, NY: D. Appleton and Company. LCCN 09020218. OCLC 192320.
- Wiseman, Nicholas Patrick Stephen (2018) [1853]. The Catholic Doctrine on the Use of the Bible. London, UK: Richardson and Son. ISBN 9781332402335.

Catholic Church titles
Preceded by Thomas Walsh	Vicar Apostolic of the London District; 1849–1850	Last appointment
New title	Archbishop of Westminster; 1850–1865	Succeeded by Henry Edward Manning
Preceded by Tommaso Pasquale Gizzi	Cardinal priest of Santa Pudenziana; 1850–1865	Succeeded by Lucien Louis Joseph Napoleon Bonaparte
