= Battle of Cardedeu =

1808 battle of the Peninsular War

- Part of Peninsular War
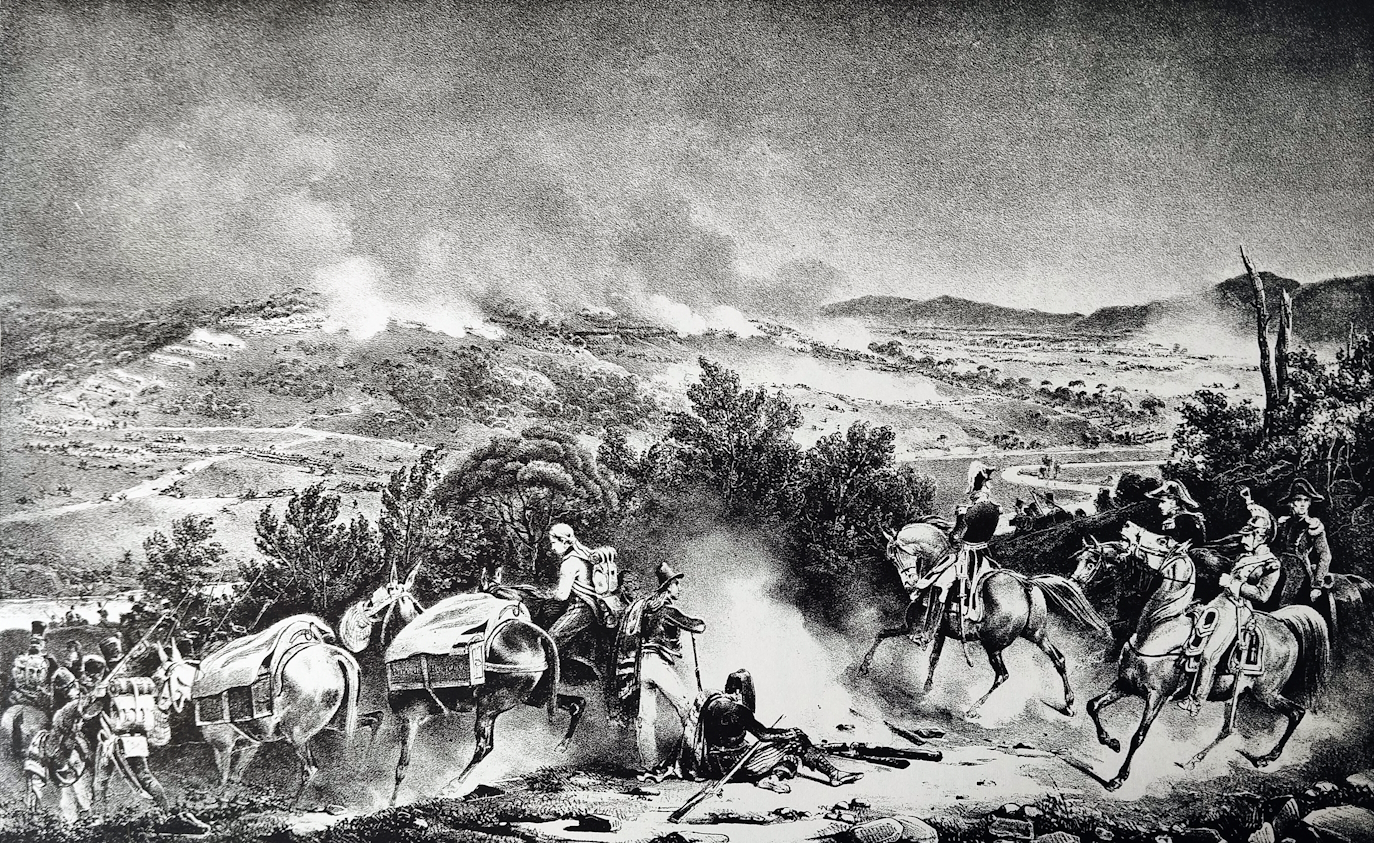
- Battle of Cardedeu, by Jean-Charles Langlois.
Date	16 December 1808
Location	Cardedeu, Catalonia, Spain 41°38′26″N 2°21′34″E
Result	Franco-Italian victory

Belligerents
(First French Empire) French Empire (Kingdom of Italy (Napoleonic)) Kingdom of Italy	Spain

Commanders and leaders
(First French Empire) Laurent Gouvion Saint-Cyr (Kingdom of Italy (Napoleonic)) Domenico Pino	(Spain) Juan Miguel de Vives (Spain) Theodor von Reding

Strength
15,000–16,500, 30 guns	9,000, 7 guns

Casualties and losses
600	2,500, 5 guns, 2 colors

Peninsular War: Napoleon's invasion
current battle

The Battle of Cardedeu on 16 December 1808 saw an Imperial French corps led by Laurent Gouvion Saint-Cyr assault a Spanish force commanded by Juan Miguel de Vives y Feliu and Theodor von Reding. Saint-Cyr won the engagement by forming most of his troops into gigantic attack columns and smashing through the Spanish lines. Cardedeu is located 17 kilometres (11 mi) northeast of Barcelona, Spain. The action occurred during the Peninsular War, part of the Napoleonic Wars.

By the fall of 1808, a French corps under Guillaume Philibert Duhesme was besieged in Barcelona by a 24,000-man Spanish army led by Vives. With 23,000 Franco-Italian soldiers, Gouvion Saint-Cyr marched from France to relieve Duhesme's troops. First Saint-Cyr undertook the successful Siege of Roses. Confronted by the fortress of Girona, which had resisted two earlier attacks, the French general resorted to a risky strategy. Leaving his artillery and most of his supplies behind, he avoided Girona by marching 16,500 men though the mountains and headed for Barcelona. Saint-Cyr completely outgeneraled Vives, who was only able to marshal 9,000 troops to block his opponent. Vives drew up his outnumbered troops on high ground, but Saint-Cyr's huge columns proved unstoppable. The Spanish withdrew after suffering heavy losses and Barcelona was soon relieved.

== Background ==
The Dos de Mayo Uprising had put Iberia in revolt against French rule. The Spanish conventional warfare had started with the Battles of El Bruch. The British intervention had started with the Battle of Roliça. Napoleon's invasion of Spain had ended successfully with the French occupation of Madrid. The Corunna campaign started with the Battle of Cardedeu.

=== French defeats ===
As part of Emperor Napoleon's plan to seize the Kingdom of Spain in a military coup, several key points, including Barcelona were captured in February 1808. Among other strong places, the French also seized San Sebastián, Pamplona and Figueras by trickery. On 2 May 1808, the Spanish people revolted against the Imperial French occupation in the Dos de Mayo Uprising.

In the early summer of 1808, a 12,710-man French corps commanded by General of Division Guillaume Philibert Duhesme was stationed at Barcelona. General of Division Joseph Chabran's 1st Division had 6,050 soldiers in eight battalions, while General of Division Giuseppe Lechi's 2nd Division consisted of 4,600 men in six battalions. The 1,700 cavalry were organized in nine squadrons under Generals of Brigade Bertrand Bessières and François Xavier de Schwarz. The force included 360 artillerists. This modest-sized corps was instructed to put down the insurrection in Catalonia, to send assistance to Marshal Bon-Adrien Jeannot de Moncey in his attempt to capture Valencia, and to hold Barcelona. Considering the intensity of the rebellion, these orders were unrealistic.

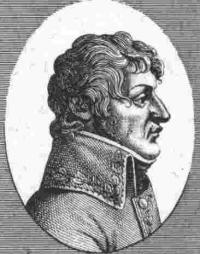
Guillaume Duhesme's men were bottled up in Barcelona.

Chabran and Schwarz were defeated at the Battles of the Bruch in mid-June and Duhesme was repulsed in the Battle of Gerona on 20–21 June. After securing the assistance of an improvised division commanded by General of Division Honoré Charles Reille, Duhesme initiated the Siege of Gerona. This unsuccessful operation lasted from 24 July to 16 August before Duhesme retreated to Barcelona and Reille withdrew to Figueres. News of the French disaster at the Battle of Bailen on 22 July 1808 buoyed Spanish morale and depressed the Imperial troops. Duhesme's troops had to fight their way back through the hills and abandon their field artillery in order to make it back to Barcelona, where they arrived on 20 August.

Meanwhile, Marquis del Palacio's division of regular Spanish troops arrived from the Balearic Islands. Supported by thousands of miquelets (Catalan militia) the Spaniards blockaded Barcelona at the beginning of August. On 31 July, they captured the castle of Mougat and its garrison of 150 Neapolitans with the help of Captain Thomas Cochrane and a British frigate. Though Duhesme's 10,000 surviving troops were in a tight spot, Del Palacio did not press them very hard. The French commander was able to send strong columns through the loose blockade in order to gather food and other supplies. On 12 October, an Italian column was roughly handled at Sant Cugat del Vallès with 300 casualties and the expeditions stopped. Because Del Palacio remained almost inert during his tenure of command, the Catalan Junta replaced him as Captain General with Juan Miguel de Vives y Feliu on 28 October. This veteran of the War of the Pyrenees had capably led the Spanish right wing at the Battle of the Black Mountain in 1794 and covered the retreat at the Battle of Boulou. Vives skirmished with the French outpost line on 8 November, but then went into hibernation until reinforcements arrived under General Theodor von Reding. On 26 November, Vives pushed the French within the walls of Barcelona, inflicting about 100 casualties.

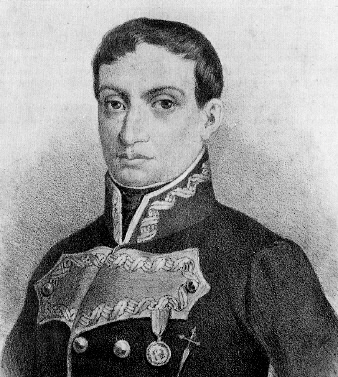
Mariano Alvarez de Castro commanded a Spanish division.

According to a 5 November report, the Army of Catalonia under Vives had 20,033 soldiers available in five divisions and a small reserve. Brigadier General Mariano Álvarez de Castro led 5,600 soldiers of the Vanguard Division. The Vanguard included 100 cavalry in the volunteer San Narciso Hussars, the regular foot regiments of Ultonia (300), Borbon (500), 2nd Barcelona (1,000), and 1st Wimpfen Swiss (400), and the volunteer tercios 1st Gerona (900), 2nd Gerona (400), Igualada (400), Cervera (400), 1st Tarragona (800), and Figueras (400). General Conde de Caldagues commanded the 4,998-strong 1st Division which consisted of six artillery pieces manned by 70 gunners, 50 sappers, the cavalry regiments Españoles Hussars (220) and Catalonia Cazadores (180), the regular infantry regiments the 2nd Walloon Guards (314), Soria (780), Borbon (151), 2nd Savoia (1,734), and 2nd Swiss (270), and the volunteer tercios Tortosa (984) and elements of Igualada and Cervera (245). General Laguna led the 2,360-man 2nd Division with seven guns manned by 84 artillerists, 30 sappers, Españoles Hussars (200), two battalions each of provincial grenadier militia of Old Castile (972) and New Castile (924), and the Zaragoza Volunteers (150).

General La Serna's 2,458-man 3rd Division comprised the regular two-battalion Granada Regiment (961), and the volunteer units 2nd Tarragona Tercio, Arzu division (325), and Sueltas companies (250). General Francisco Milans del Bosch led the 4th Division which was made up of 3,710 volunteer soldiers in the following tercios, 1st Lerida (872), Vich (976), Manresa (937), and Vallès (925). The 907-strong Reserve included four guns manned by 50 artillerymen, 20 sappers, 80 Españoles Hussars, a 60-man detachment from the Spanish Guards, the detached grenadiers from the Soria (188) and Wimpfen (169) Regiments, and the General's bodyguard (340). Two divisions of Granadan reinforcements under Reding were just arriving or on the way. The 1st Division numbered 8,200 men and included one battalion of the 2nd Reding Swiss Regiment (1,000) and two 1,200-man battalions each of the 1st Granada, Baza, and Almeria Regiments. The 6,000-man 2nd Division consisted of 1,200-man battalions. These were the one-battalion Antequera and the two-battalion Santa Fé and Loxa Regiments. The Granada Hussars with 670 sabers and six artillery pieces worked by 130 gunners accompanied Reding's force. In addition, the 3rd Division of the Army of Aragon under General Palafox was instructed to reinforce Vives on 10 November. The division numbered 4,688 soldiers and comprised 64 gunners, one troop of the Ferdinand VII Cazadores Cavalry (22), and the volunteer infantry battalions 1st Zaragoza (638), 3rd Zaragoza (593), Ferdinand VII (648), Daroca (503), La Reunion (1,286), and General Reserve (934).

=== Saint-Cyr takes command ===
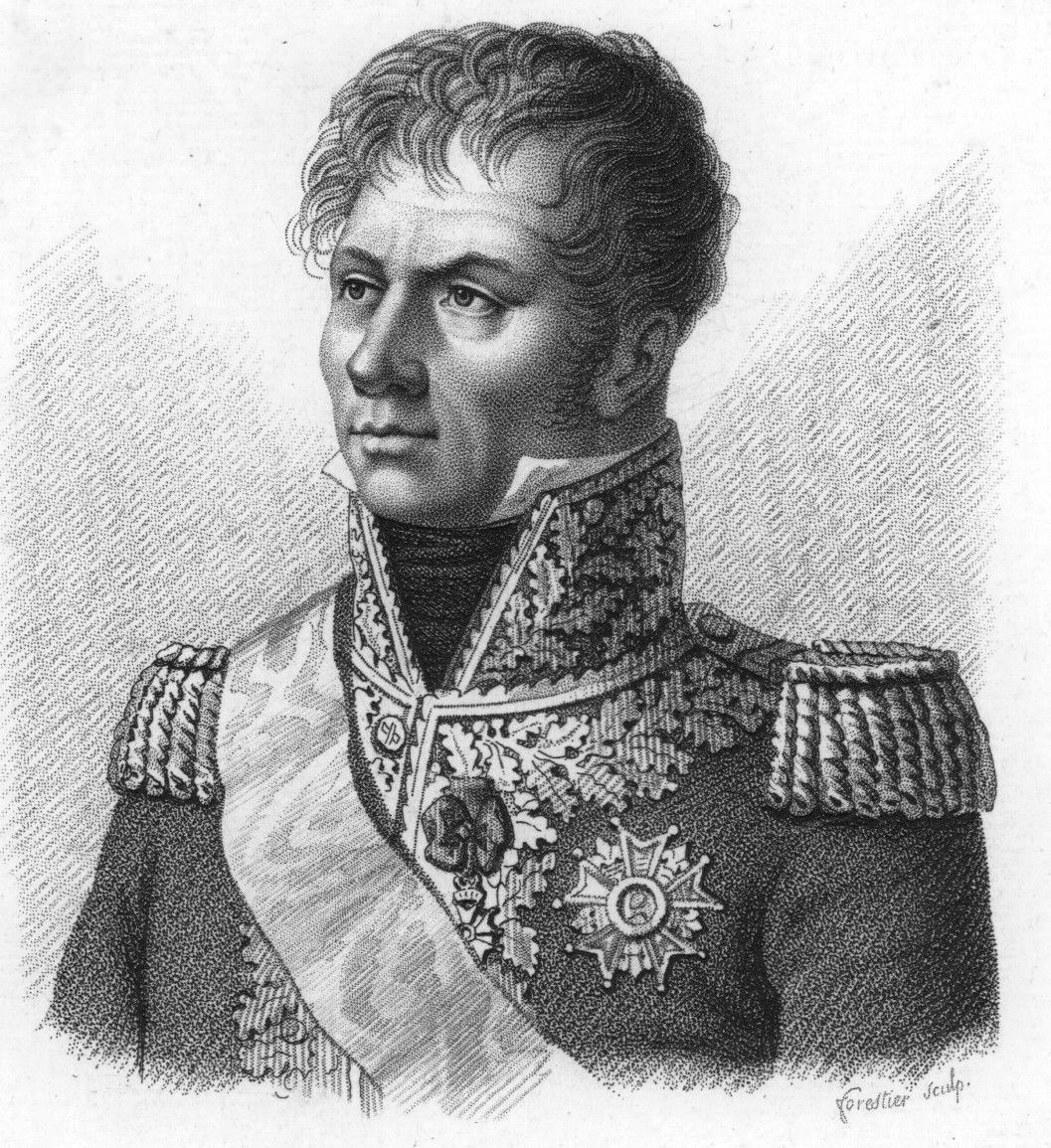
Laurent Gouvion Saint-Cyr had orders from Napoleon to relieve Duhesme in Barcelona.

After the failures of the summer, Napoleon appointed General of Division Laurent Gouvion Saint-Cyr to replace Duhesme on 17 August 1808. A week earlier, the emperor had ordered two crack divisions to reinforce the VII Corps from the garrison of Italy. General of Division Joseph Souham led 10 veteran French battalions while General of Division Domenico Pino commanded the best Italian units. On the other hand, Reille's division had been formed of 8,000 soldiers of indifferent quality. His rag-tag force included French National Guards, drafted gendarmes, French reserves and provisional units, one Swiss battalion, and the French 113th Line Infantry Regiment, plus cavalry and artillery. The so-called French 113th was actually made up of Italians from the recently annexed Grand Duchy of Tuscany.

For many years, Saint-Cyr served France with distinction and had "first-rate ability" according to historian Charles Oman. His soldiers recognized his talents and had confidence in him but he was too aloof to be loved by them. He was also very self-centered and quick to leave his fellow generals to their own devices. Saint-Cyr's dislike of Napoleon had held him back from earlier promotion. Though he later wrote darkly that the emperor wanted him to fail, Napoleon made him a Marshal of France in 1812. Saint-Cyr's reinforcements did not begin to assemble in southern France until mid-September and lack of wagons caused further delay. On 5 November Saint-Cyr's corps finally crossed the Pyrenees, near the Fort de Bellegarde.

At this time, Saint-Cyr's VII Corps consisted of six infantry divisions, three cavalry brigades, and attached artillery. A roster from 10 October listed a total of 42,382 soldiers, but 1,302 were on detached duty and another 4,948 were wounded or sick. Of these, Chabran's 1st and Lechi's 2nd Divisions plus the cavalry brigades of Bessières and Schwarz were bottled up in Barcelona with Duhesme. Reille's 3rd Division had one battalion each of the 32nd Light, 16th Line, and 56th Line Infantry Regiments, one battalion each of the 5th Reserve Legion, the Chasseurs des Montagnes, and the Swiss Valais, two battalions of the 113th Line, and four battalions of the Perpignan Provisional Regiment. Souham's 4th Division was made up of three battalions each of the 1st Light and 42nd Line Infantry Regiments, two battalions of the 7th Line, and one battalion each of the 3rd Light and 67th Line.

Pino's 5th Division comprised three battalions each of the Italian 1st Light, 2nd Light, and 6th Line Infantry Regiments, two battalions of the 4th Line, and one battalion each of the 5th and 7th Line. General of Division Louis François Jean Chabot's 6th Division included only two battalions of the 2nd Neapolitan Line Infantry Regiment and one battalion of the Chasseurs of the Eastern Pyrenees. General of Brigade Jacques Fontane's cavalry brigade consisted of the Royal and 7th Italian Chasseurs à Cheval. The corps included the French 24th Dragoon Regiment which was unbrigaded. Of the divisions in Saint-Cyr's field army, Reille counted 4,612 men, Souham 7,712, Pino 8,368, and Chabot 1,988. The three cavalry regiments numbered 1,700 troopers while the gun crews had about 500 artillerists.

Upon taking his new command, Saint-Cyr received his orders in person from Napoleon. The emperor instructed him that the relief of Barcelona was the prime objective but allowed him discretion in how to carry out the assignment. According to the latest information from Duhesme, Barcelona could be expected to hold out until the end of December before running out of food. Saint-Cyr decided that he must first reduce the port of Roses (Rosas) before marching to Duhesme's relief. The Siege of Roses consumed another month, lasting from 7 November to 5 December 1808. The successful operation cost the Imperial French forces about 1,000 killed, wounded, or died of disease.

With Roses out of the way, Saint-Cyr was free to direct his energies to the relief of Barcelona. After assigning Reille to hold Figueras and Roses and to protect the roads from France, Saint-Cyr had about 1,500 horsemen and 15,000 foot soldiers in three divisions of 26 total battalions. Girona (Gerona) stood squarely in the path that the French army would have to take. The French general knew that besieging Girona was out of the question; in the time it would take to capture the place, Barcelona would be starved out. Once past Girona, there were two available roads. Knowing that the coast road via Mataró was obstructed and could easily be placed under the guns of the British Royal Navy, Saint-Cyr chose to use the inland road. In order for his plan to work, the Imperial general hoped to keep Vives guessing as to his true intentions and to defeat his opponent in detail.

== Battle ==
=== French offensive ===
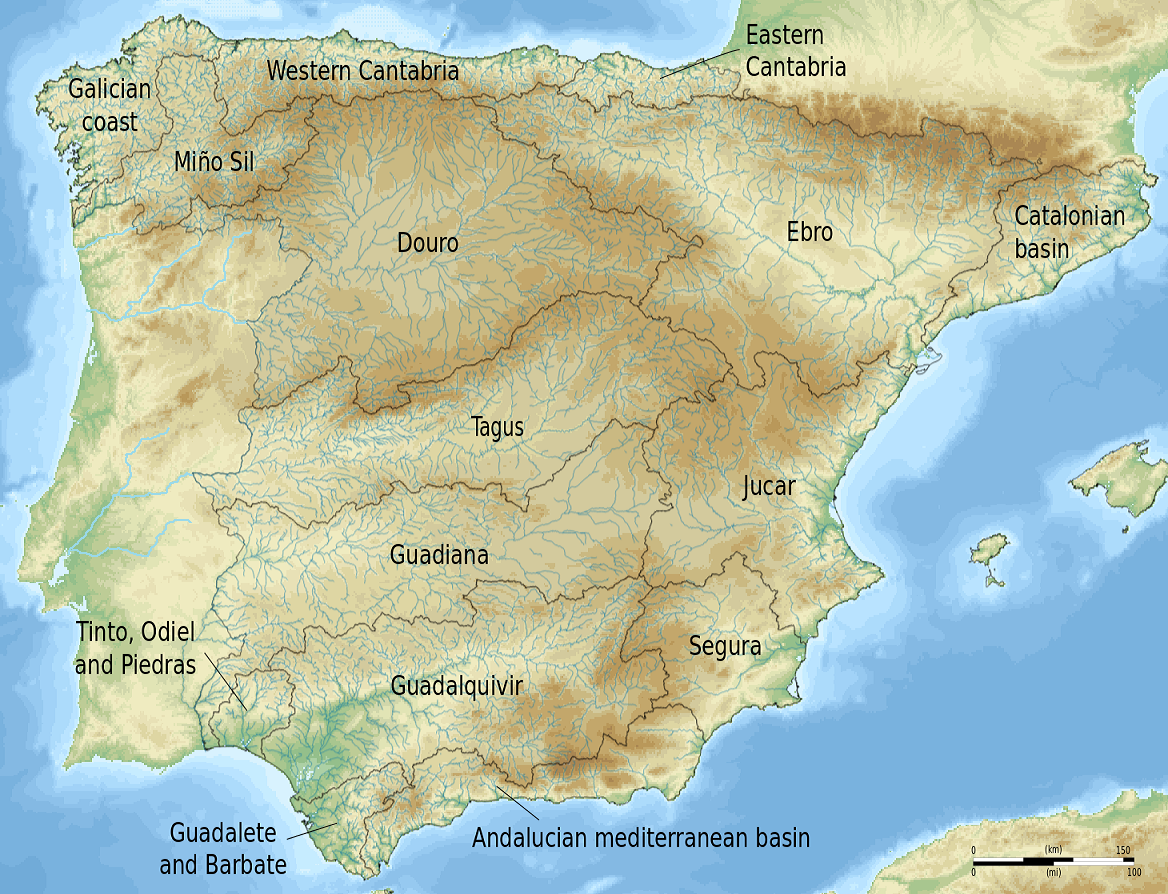
Mogent river

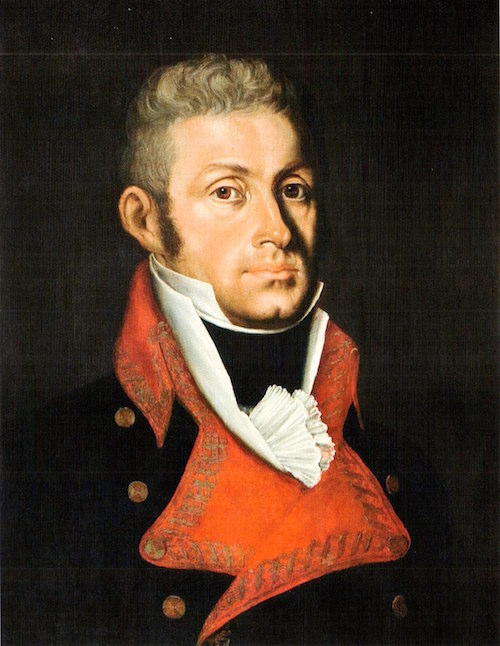
Theodor von Reding led the Spanish right wing.

On 9 November 1808, Saint-Cyr massed his field army on the north bank of the Ter River opposite Girona. The following day, the French general advanced on the city as if to invest it. He wished to tempt Álvarez and Lazán into offering battle, but the two Spanish generals declined to be drawn out, seeing that their 8,000 men would be crushed. On the 11th, Saint-Cyr sent his artillery and wagon train back to Figueras and marched to La Bisbal d'Empordà where his quartermasters handed out four days of rations to each soldier. Each soldier carried 50 cartridges of ammunition and mule train carried another 10 rounds per man. The French general was taking an enormous risk. If the army remained too long in the mountains it would starve and if it were forced to fight several battles it would be out of ammunition. On 12 November, the Franco-Italians passed near Palamós and fought their way through a force of miquelets (Catalan militia) under Juan Clarós.

On 13 November, Saint-Cyr's host stumbled into Vidreres which was near the coast road that led to Malgrat de Mar, Mataró, and Barcelona. That evening the Imperial soldiers saw the campfires of Lazán to the north and other enemy campfires to the south. But Saint-Cyr knew of a secret path from a Perpignan smuggler, that connected the coast road with the inland road. Several search parties that were sent out to find the path during the 14th failed to locate it, so Saint-Cyr personally set out with a small escort to find it. In this he was successful, though the group was nearly captured by guerillas and had to fight its way clear. On the 15th the entire Franco-Italian army snaked through the hills, bypassing the small fortress of Hostalric and reaching the inland road at Sant Celoni. At the latter place the Imperial troops scattered a force of miquelets under Milans. Though his men were tired, Saint-Cyr hustled his soldiers along the highway until they reached the dangerous Trentapassos defile which was found to be unoccupied. That evening the Franco-Italians could see a line of campfires ahead of them, indicating the presence of the Spanish army.

The report of Saint-Cyr's march into the hills on 11 November reached the Spanish camp promptly. Vives responded by sending Reding and seven battalions of his leading echelon, a total of 5,000 men, to watch the inland road. Milans with 3,000 volunteers was ordered to block the coast road. Though Caldagues begged him to send every available man to stop the Imperial army, Vives held back at least 16,000 troops to maintain the blockade of Barcelona. Finding the coast road clear, Milans moved to Sant Celoni where his men were defeated. The news of this action on 15 November finally prompted Vives to take an additional 4,000 men and march through the night to reinforce Reding at dawn on 16 November 1808. Caldagues and the remaining 12,000 troops kept up the blockade of Duhesme's troops. Consequently, Saint-Cyr's 16,500 troops only faced 9,000 Spaniards under Vives. Milans and 3,000 more were to the east, recovering from their repulse, while Lazán and 6,000 more were somewhere to the north. According to Gaston Bodart, the Franco-Italians counted 13,500 infantry and 1,500 cavalry while Vives' Spanish force numbered 8,400 infantry and 600 cavalry. Digby Smith added that Vives had 7 guns while Saint-Cyr had 30 guns.

=== Action ===
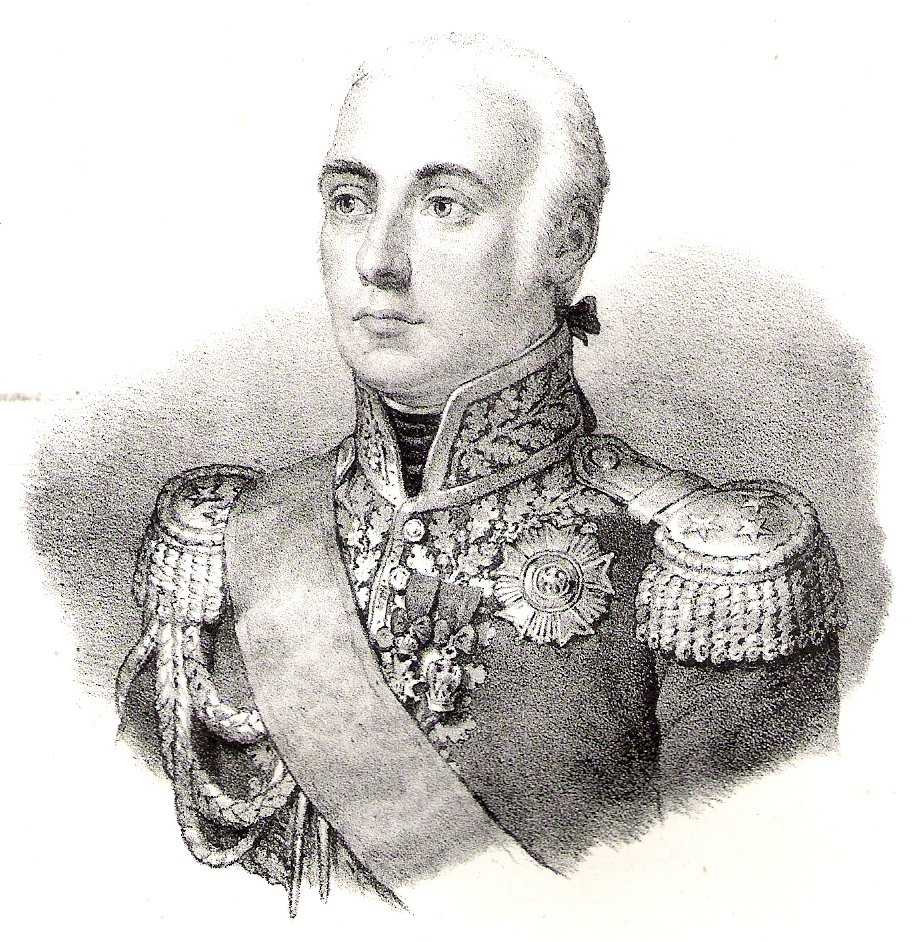
Domenico Pino disobeyed Saint-Cyr's orders and his division's first attack failed.

The battlefield is located between Llinars del Vallès to the east and Cardedeu to the west. The Mogent River, a tributary of the Besòs runs from the northeast to the southwest through the area and south of the Autopista AP-7. Several streams run into the Mogent from the north. Vives reached the position in the morning and consequently had no time to make a defensive plan. Instead, he deployed his first line behind the Riera de la Roca stream and his second line behind it, farther uphill. Reding's Granadan division held the right wing as far south as the Mogent, while Vives defended the center and left wing with his Catalan troops. There were three guns on a hill overlooking the main road in the center, two more artillery pieces on the left, and two guns with the reserve. The miquelets of Vich held the far left flank. Two battalions and two squadrons of the Españoles Hussars were in reserve. The area was dotted with pine and oak groves amid plowed fields, making it hard for both sides to discern enemy movements.

Saint-Cyr knew that time was of the essence. The last rations had been eaten, ammunition was running low, and every minute of delay allowed Lazán to close in on his rear. Instructing Chabot to hold the Trentapassos defile with three battalions, the French commander determined to smash through Vives' lines with the remaining 23 battalions. Pino's Italian division was in front, followed by Souham's French division. Saint-Cyr ordered Pino to keep his battalions in column formation and crash through the enemy lines by sheer impetus. Pino was forbidden to deploy a single battalion, not even to take prisoners.

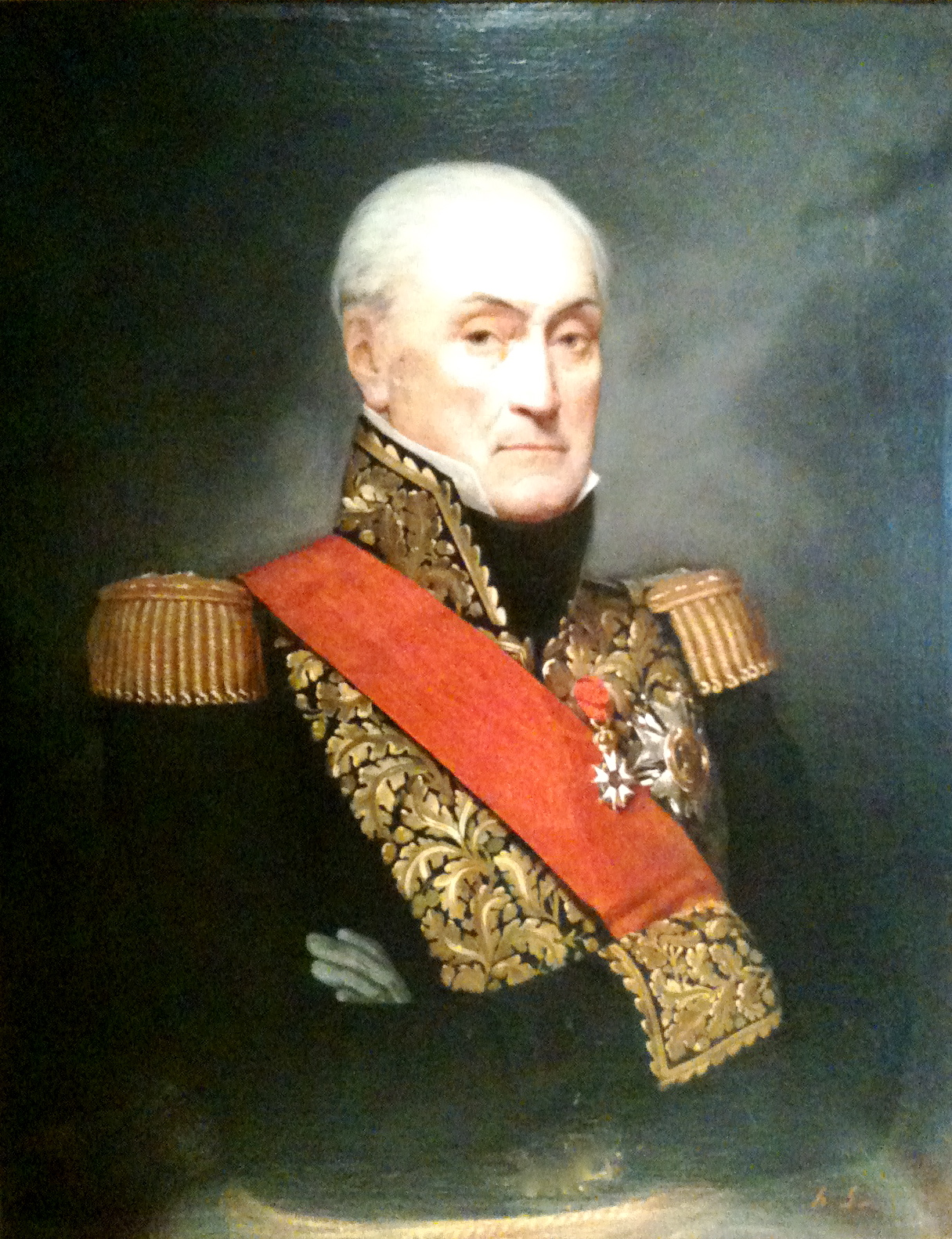
Joseph Souham's veteran French division breached the Spanish defenses.

As Pino's narrow column advanced to pierce the Spanish right-center, it began to come under galling fire from the flanks. Ignoring his orders, Pino panicked and sent Fontane with one battalion each of the 2nd Light and 7th Line to the right. He directed General of Brigade Luigi Mazzucchelli to the left with the remaining two battalions of the 2nd Light and three battalions of the 4th Line. The attack broke the Spanish first line but came to a stand before the second line, halfway up the hillside. Reding ordered the Españoles Hussars to charge and sent his whole line forward. Mazzucchelli's Italians faltered and were chased back to their starting point.

At this moment Saint-Cyr arrived at the front to witness the collapse of the first attack. The French commander immediately directed Souham's 10 battalions to angle to their left and assault Reding's right flank. He also sent Pino's second brigade, the three battalions each of the 1st Light and 6th Line, to rush the Spanish center. Fontane continued to distract the enemy's left flank with his two battalions. Souham's heavy column plowed into and ruptured Reding's line. Meanwhile, Pino's second brigade pressed back the Spanish center. With the Spanish position unraveling, Saint-Cyr ordered the Italian light cavalry under Carlo Balabio to charge up the main highway. As the horsemen galloped up the hill, the entire Spanish force bolted to the rear.

The Imperial troops inflicted losses of 1,000 killed and wounded on their enemies. In addition, they scooped up 1,500 Spanish prisoners and captured five artillery pieces and two colors. Saint-Cyr reported losses of 600, mostly in Pino's Italian units. Reding was nearly captured while trying to rally his men. Vives abandoned his horse while escaping up a cliff. He reached the coast and was taken off to Tarragona in HMS Cambrian. Milans arrived on the scene after the battle was finished. Lazán never got as far as Sant Celoni, nor did he come into contact with Chabot's small division. After hearing the bad news, Lazán marched his command back to Girona.

== Result ==
On the 16th Caldagues repelled an attempt by Duhesme to break out. But when he found out that night that Vives had been routed, he abandoned the blockade and fell back behind the Llobregat River. The Spanish army left behind large stocks of food at Sarrià. On 17 November 1808, Saint-Cyr's victorious troops marched into Barcelona. He later claimed that Duhesme did not offer a word of thanks and even insisted that Barcelona could have held out for six more weeks. At this Saint-Cyr coldly produced a copy of one of Duhesme's messages pleading for immediate help. The campaign, however, was not over. On 21 December Saint-Cyr's army faced Vives, Reding, and Caldagues at the Battle of Molins de Rey.

== Aftermath ==
The Corunna campaign proceeded with the Battle of Molins de Rei.

== See also ==
- Timeline of the Peninsular War

== Bibliography ==
- Bodart, Gaston (1908). Militär-historisches Kriegs-Lexikon (1618-1905).
- Gates, David (2002). The Spanish Ulcer: A History of the Peninsular War. London: Pimlico. ISBN 0-7126-9730-6.
- Oman, Sir Charles William Chadwick (1902a). A History of the Peninsular War Volume I. Vol. 1. Oxford: Clarendon Press.
- Oman, Sir Charles William Chadwick (1902b). A History of the Peninsular War Volume II. Vol. 2. Oxford: Clarendon Press.
- Phipps, Ramsay Weston (2011) [1931]. The Armies of the First French Republic and the Rise of the Marshals of Napoleon I: The Armies in the West 1793 to 1797 and The Armies in the South 1793 to March 1796. Vol. 3. Pickle Partners Publishing. ISBN 978-1-908692-26-9.
- Smith, Digby (1998). The Napoleonic Wars Data Book. London: Greenhill. ISBN 1-85367-276-9.
