= Blockade of Barcelona =

1808 blockade of the Peninsular War

- Part of the Peninsular War
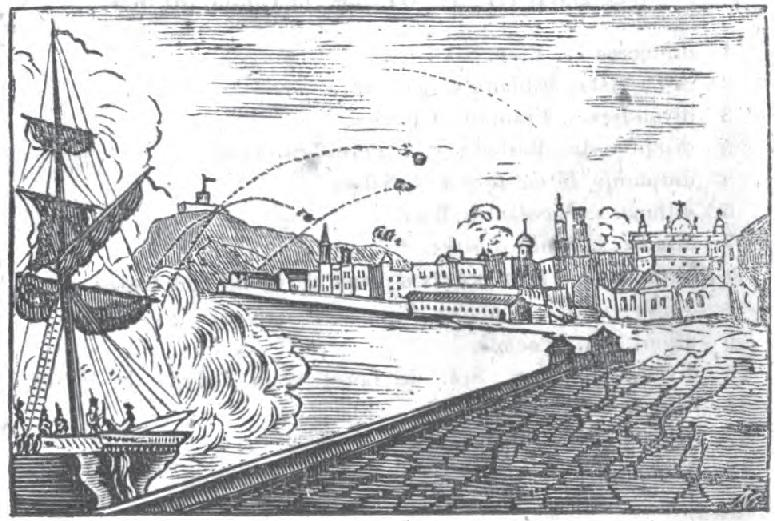
- 1847 illustration of the Royal Navy bombarding French-held Barcelona during the blockade
Date	1 August – 21 December 1808
Location	Barcelona, Catalonia, Spain 41.4044°N 2.1608°E
Result	Frenco-Italian victory

Belligerents
(First French Empire) French Empire; Kingdom of Italy	Kingdom of Spain; United Kingdom

Commanders and leaders
(First French Empire) Guillaume Duhesme (Kingdom of Italy (Napoleonic)) Giuseppe Lechi; Relief force: (First French Empire) St. Cyr (Kingdom of Italy (Napoleonic)) Domenico Pino	(Spain) Joan Miquel de Vives

Strength
8,000 infantry and 1,400 cavalry 23,680 (relief force)	19,551 infantry and 780 cavalry

Blockade of Barcelona (Catalonia)

The blockade of Barcelona was a failed attempt by Spanish troops to recapture the French occupied Barcelona between August and December 1808 during the Peninsular War.

== Background ==
The French under Guillaume Philibert Duhesme had occupied Barcelona on 29 February 1808.

In the Dos de Mayo Uprising in Madrid, citizens revolted against the French on 2 May 1808, and three days later, pressure from Napoleon forced Ferdinand VII of Spain to return the crown to his father, who handed it over to Napoleon who, in turn handed it over to his brother Joseph Bonaparte on 10 May.

But Spanish-occupied Girona kept on blocking the connection from Barcelona to Perpignan in France as Duhesme besieged Girona on 20–21 June 1808 unsuccessfully and on 24 July–16 August, his second siege of Girona failed again.

== Blockade ==
Meanwhile, on 23 July, one day before the start of the second siege of Girona, the Marquis of Del Palacio landed at Tarragona at the head of a division of regular Spanish troops. French Barcelona was defended by only 3,500 Swiss and Italian remaining troops under the command of General Lecchi. On 31 July the last of the French outposts, the castle of Mongat, surrendered and the blockade of Barcelona started. After the failed second siege of Gerona, Duhesme returned to Barcelona on 20 August and the blockade turned into a siege.

== Relief ==
On 5 November, General St. Cyr with his troops, now 23,680 strong, was marching towards Barcelona. His siege of Roses, from 7 November to 5 December 1808, ended with a French victory.

The decisive Battle of Cardadeu on 16 December 1808 ended with a French victory. On 21 December, St. Cyr defeated the Spanish at the Battle of Molins de Rei, driving the Catalan army away from Barcelona. An Italian division led by Domenico Pino was heavily involved in the aforementioned battles leading to the relief of Barcelona.

== See also ==
- Wikisource:1911 Encyclopædia Britannica/Peninsular War
- Sieges of Barcelona (801–1808)
- Timeline of the Peninsular War
- War of the Spanish Succession
