= Siege of Roses (1808) =

1808 siege during the Peninsular War

- Part of Peninsular War
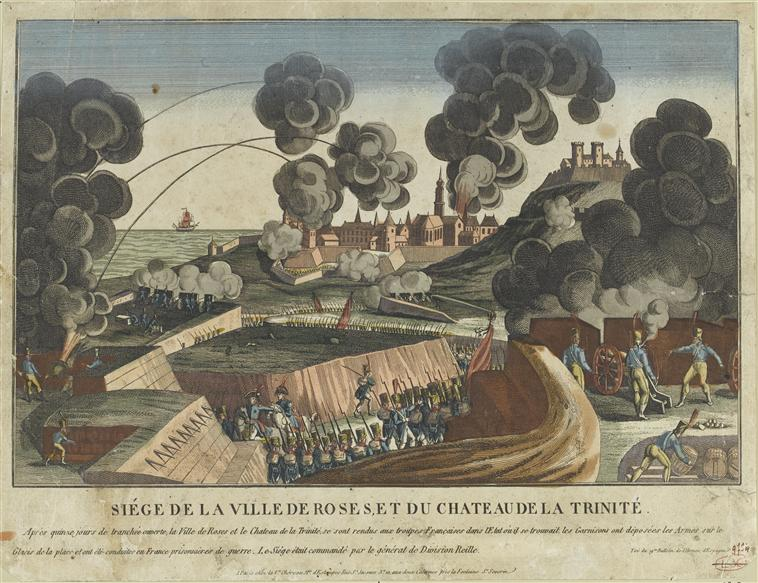
- Contemporary print of the Siege of Roses
Date	7 November to 5 December 1808
Location	Roses, Catalonia, Spain 42°16′N 3°11′E
Result	French victory

Belligerents
(France) French Empire (Kingdom of Italy (Napoleonic)) Kingdom of Italy	Kingdom of Spain; United Kingdom

Commanders and leaders
(France) L. Gouvion Saint-Cyr (France) Honoré Reille (Kingdom of Italy (Napoleonic)) Domenico Pino	(Spain) Peter O'Daly (United Kingdom) Thomas Cochrane

Strength
23,000	3,500; 58 guns 1 third-rate 1 frigate 2 bomb ketches

Casualties and losses
1,000	3,166; 58 guns captured

Peninsular War: Napoleon's invasion
current battle

The Siege of Roses or Siege of Rosas from 7 November to 5 December 1808 saw an Imperial French corps led by Laurent Gouvion Saint-Cyr invest a Catalan and Spanish garrison commanded by Peter O'Daly. After a siege lasting a month in which the haven and town of Roses was captured and the nearby Trinity Castle invested by over 13,000 French and Italian infantry, artillery and cavalry with heavy siege trains on the hills above, the citadel was surrendered to the Napoleonic forces. Roses (Rosas) is located 43 kilometres (27 mi) northeast of Girona, Catalonia, Spain. The action occurred during the Peninsular War, part of the Napoleonic Wars.

In the summer and fall of 1808, an Imperial French corps under Guillaume Philibert Duhesme was isolated in Barcelona by a 24,000-man Spanish army led by Juan Miguel de Vives y Feliu. With 23,000 men, Gouvion Saint-Cyr moved from the French border to relieve Duhesme's troops. The first obstacle to Gouvion Saint-Cyr's mission was the haven of Roses defended by a large citadel with sea approaches defended by a headland castle. The 3,500 Catalan and Spanish defenders of Roses were mostly local miquelets (militia) stiffened by a small unit of regulars from the Fija de Roses garrison. Although assisted by a bombardment of the French lines by several British warships commanded by Captain Robert Hallowell, and a strong defence of the castle by Catalan regulars and militia with men of the 38-gun frigate HMS Imperieuse commanded by Thomas Cochrane, the garrison was unable to prevent the advance of the Franco-Italian siege lines tightening its grip around the citadel. The defenders eventually capitulated, the soldiers and civilians inside the citadel being taken into captivity in Figueres and the local defenders of the castle being taken by the British to join Vivès Spanish forces in the marshes to the south. Gouvion Saint-Cyr still faced the problem of getting past Girona in order to succor Duhesme's soldiers. The French general made a bold but risky maneuver and the result was the Battle of Cardedeu on 16 December.

== Background ==
Napoleon's invasion of Spain had started with the Battle of Zornoza.

=== Initial operations ===
Emperor Napoleon I plotted to replace the royal family of the Kingdom of Spain. Pursuant to his design, he ordered several key points, including Barcelona, to be seized in February 1808. On 29 February, General of Division Giuseppe Lechi's Imperial French troops were marching through Barcelona, ostensibly to help fight Portugal. Lechi staged a military review, but it was a cover for gaining control of the citadel. As the soldiers marched past the main gate of the fortress, they suddenly turned left and rushed inside. Without spilling a drop of blood, the Imperial troops herded the baffled Spanish garrison out of the fortifications and occupied the place. Among other key points, the French also grabbed San Sebastián, Pamplona and Figueres. On 2 May 1808, the infuriated Spanish people rose in rebellion against their French occupiers.

A 12,710-man Franco-Italian corps commanded by General of Division Guillaume Philibert Duhesme guarded Barcelona in June 1808. General of Division Joseph Chabran's 1st Division consisted of 6,050 soldiers in eight battalions, while Lechi's 2nd Division had 4,600 men in six battalions. Generals of Brigade Bertrand Bessières and François Xavier de Schwarz led 1,700 cavalrymen in nine squadrons. There were also 360 artillerists. The French authorities in Madrid confidently expected that Duhesme's corps would quickly stamp out the rebellion in Catalonia, but they grossly underestimated its seriousness. The miquelets, the Catalan militia, turned out in large numbers to harass their enemies. In June, Schwarz and Chabran were beaten at the Battles of the Bruch and Duhesme was turned back at the Battle of Girona.

Finally awakening to reality, Napoleon ordered General of Division Honoré Charles Reille and a division of reinforcements to Duhesme's assistance. The troops were of low quality and scattered throughout southern France, but Reille quickly cobbled together a fraction of this force and successfully relieved the French garrison of Figueres. Joined by more of his division, he next marched on the port of Roses.

=== First attack on Roses ===
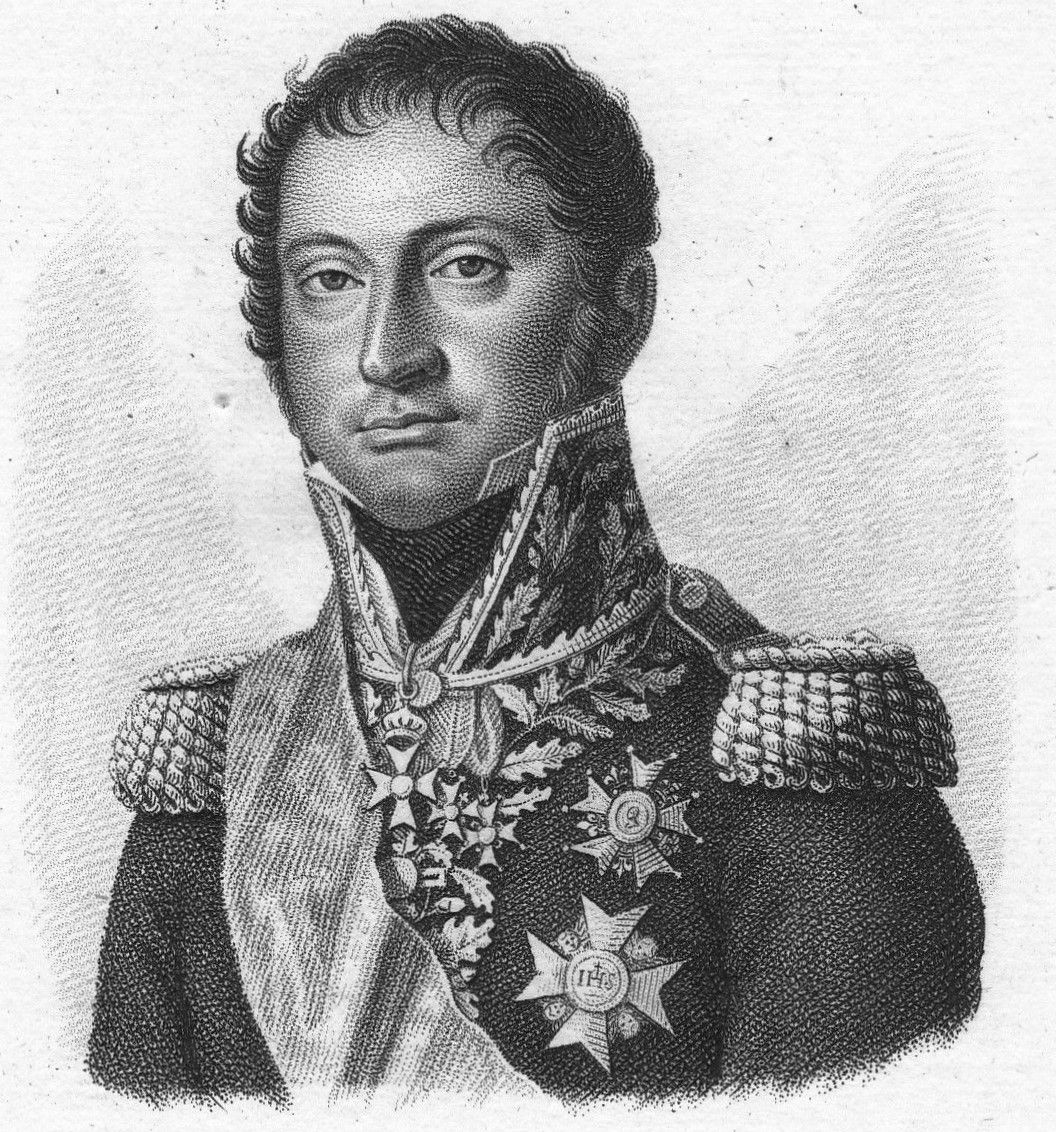
Honoré Charles Reille

Reille commanded 4,000 men and two cannons. These troops included two battalions of the 113th Line Infantry Regiment, 560 men of the Pyrenées Orientales Garde Nationale, two companies of the 2nd Swiss Infantry Regiment, 700 gendarmes and department reserves, and various march battalions and conscript drafts. Roses was held by about 800 men of the Fija de Roses regiment and 400 miquelets, the Catalan militia, with 5,000 more miquelets under Colonel Juan Clarós in the nearby hills. The defenders were given a boost when the British warship HMS Montagu, under Captain Robert Otway, appeared off the port and landed her marines to help. Reille launched an attack on 11 July 1808, but his troops were driven off with 200 casualties. Spanish losses were light.

Thwarted at Roses, Reille moved in the direction of Girona. When he reached there, he joined with Duhesme to initiate the Siege of Girona. Meanwhile, 5,000 Spanish regular troops from the Balearic Islands commanded by the Marquis Del Palacio landed at Tarragona. Appointed Captain General of Catalonia, Del Palacio joined his regulars with a large mass of Catalan irregulars to start a blockade of Barcelona, on 1 August 1808. Lechi's 3,500-man Italo-Swiss garrison defended the city. Among a large population that threatened to revolt at any moment, Lechi began sending alarming reports to Duhesme after being compelled to abandon his outposts, such as the castle of Mongat.

Even though Duhesme mustered 13,000 soldiers for the siege operation, it ended in failure after starting on 24 July and dragging on until 16 August. When his siege lines were attacked from the rear by a force under the Conde de Caldagues, Duhesme gave up and ordered a withdrawal. He buried his heavy siege cannons, burned his supplies, and headed back to Barcelona while Reille fell back to Figueres. While marching along the coast road Duhesme's marching columns were bombarded by the British frigate HMS Iphigenia commanded by Captain Thomas Cochrane. Faced with this threat and the miquelets' road demolitions, the French veered away from the vulnerable coast highway. After throwing eight field guns into the sea and leaving behind their baggage train, Duhesme's men struck out into the mountains and finally reached Barcelona on 20 August. One source described the Imperial column as "a starving, demoralized mob" by the time it arrived. In October, Napoleon appointed General of Division Laurent Gouvion Saint-Cyr and a new corps to relieve Barcelona.

=== Opposing forces ===
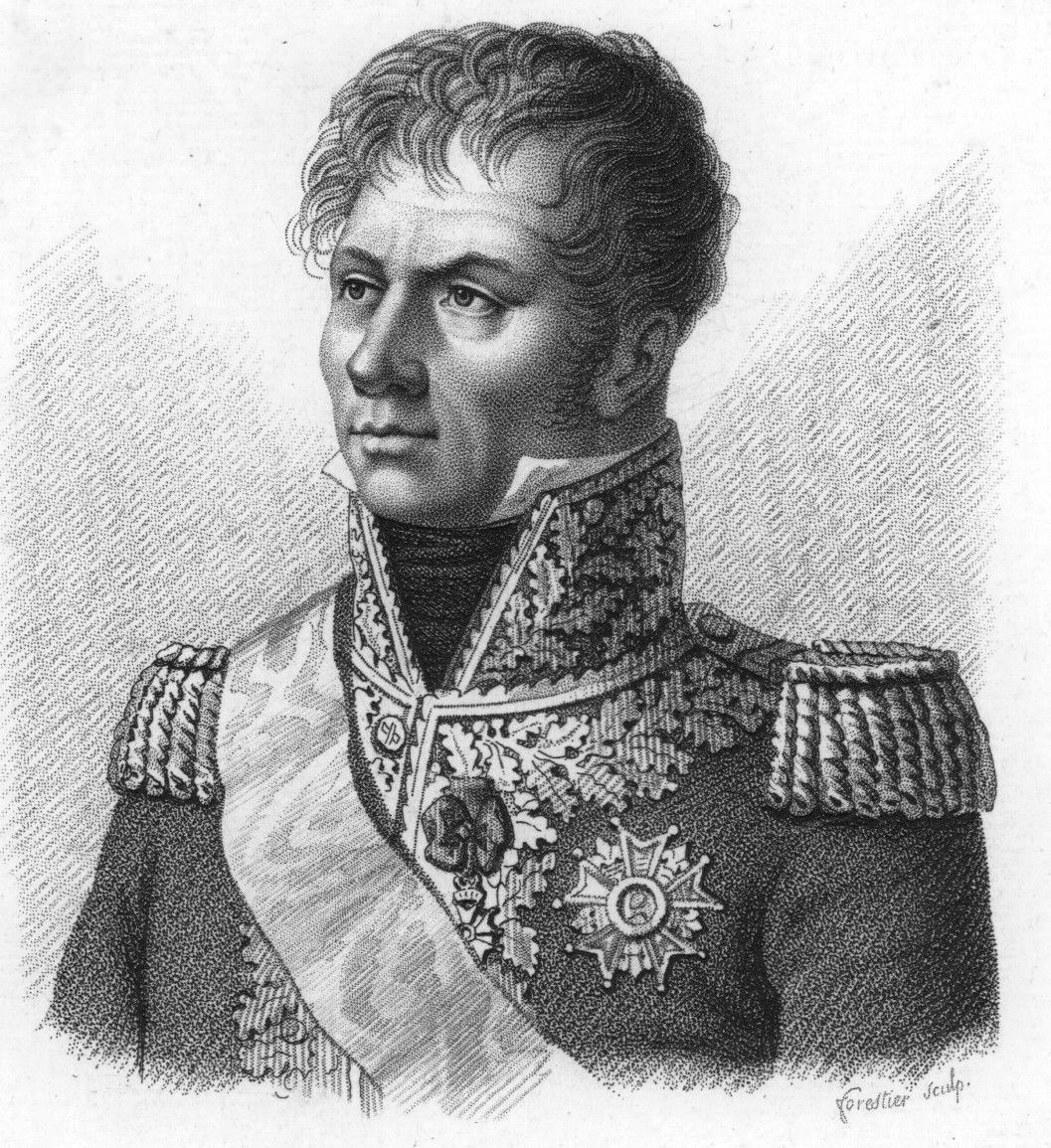
Laurent Gouvion Saint-Cyr

The newly activated VII Corps was made up of six infantry divisions and three cavalry brigades. Chabran's 1st Division, Lechi's 2nd Division, and the mounted brigades of Bessières and Schwarz were cooped up inside Barcelona with Duhesme. With Gouvion Saint-Cyr were Reille's 3rd Division of 12 battalions, General of Division Joseph Souham's 4th Division of 10 battalions, General of Division Domenico Pino's 5th Division of 13 battalions, Louis François Jean Chabot's 6th Division of three battalions, and General of Brigade Jacques Fontane's cavalry brigade of one dragoon and one light cavalry regiment. There was also one unattached dragoon regiment. Including Duhesme's stranded troops, the VII Corps counted 42,380 soldiers. To build up this force, Napoleon had to shift troops from Italy to Spain. On 28 October the siege artillery finally arrived at the frontier.

Bottled up in Barcelona, Duhesme's 10,000 remaining troops were in a vulnerable situation, but Del Palacio did not press operations with vigor. Instead, he ordered Caldagues to hold a line 15 miles (24 km) long with 2,000 regulars and 4,000 to 5,000 miquelets while remaining at Tarragona, far from the action. Duhesme periodically sent out strong columns to strip the countryside of food and supplies for his soldiers. On 12 October, a column was roughly handled and the excursions finally stopped. Finally, on 28 October, the Catalan Junta replaced Del Palacio with Captain General Juan Miguel de Vives y Feliu. The new commander was a veteran of the War of the Pyrenees, having commanded the Spanish left wing at the Battle of Boulou in 1794. De Vives attacked the French outpost line on 6 November. After this, the Spanish remained quiescent until 26 November when de Vives' offensive forced the French to take refuge behind the walls of Barcelona.

In the fall of 1808, the 20,031 men of the Army of Catalonia were organized into a vanguard, four divisions, and a reserve. Brigadier General Mariano Álvarez de Castro led the Vanguard with 5,500 infantry in 10 battalions and 100 cavalry in one squadron. Mariscal de Campo Caldagues commanded the 1st Division with 4,528 foot soldiers in seven battalions, 400 horsemen in four squadrons, and six guns served by 70 artillerists. Mariscal de Campo Gregorio Laguna directed the 2nd Division with 2,076 soldiers in five battalions, 200 cavalry in two squadrons, and seven artillery pieces served by 84 gunners. Colonel Gaspar Gomez de la Serna led the 3rd Division with 2,458 men in five battalions and Colonel Francisco Milans del Bosch commanded the 4th Division with 3,710 troops in four battalions. There was also a reserve of 777 infantry, 80 cavalry, and 48 artillerists serving four guns.

== Siege ==
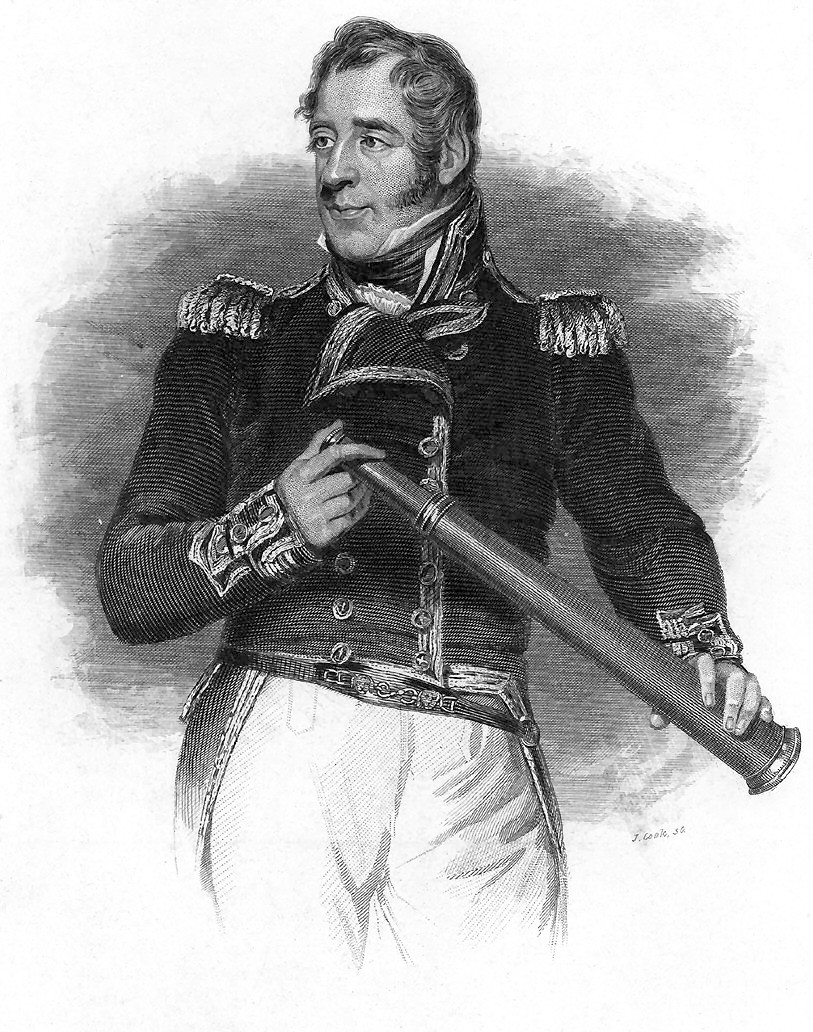
Thomas Cochrane

Gouvion Saint-Cyr's field force numbered 23,000 men. He appointed Reille to manage the siege while he and the rest of the corps stood by to fend off any relief attempts. Reille had 12,000 Imperial troops in 24 battalions supported by four foot artillery batteries. For the siege, the French general employed his own and Pino's divisions. Reille's 3rd Division included one battalion each of the 16th Line, 32nd Light, 56th Line, and 113th Line Infantry Regiments, four battalions of the Regiment of Perpignan, and the Valais, Chasseurs des Montagnes, and 5th Reserve Legion Battalions. Pino's 5th Division was made up of three battalions each of the Italian 1st Light, 2nd Light, and 6th Line Infantry Regiments, two battalions of the Italian 4th Line Infantry Regiment, and one battalion each of the Italian 5th and 7th Line Infantry Regiments.

The garrison of Roses consisted of 3,500 soldiers and 58 cannons commanded by Colonel Peter O'Daly. The small core of regulars was represented by 150 men of the Ultonia Infantry Regiment, one company of the Wimpffen Swiss Regiment, a half-battalion of the 2nd Light Infantry of Barcelona, and 120 artillerists. Later in the siege, one weak battalion of the Borbon Infantry Regiment was landed. The remainder of the garrison was made up of the Berga, Figueras, Igualada, and Lérida Tercios, which were formations of miquelets. Providing naval support was the British third-rate HMS Excellent, Captain John West. As the siege progressed Excellent was replaced by HMS Fame , Captain Richard Bennett. Also present were two bomb vessels, HMS Meteor and HMS Lucifer. Cochrane's Imperieuse arrived later in the siege.

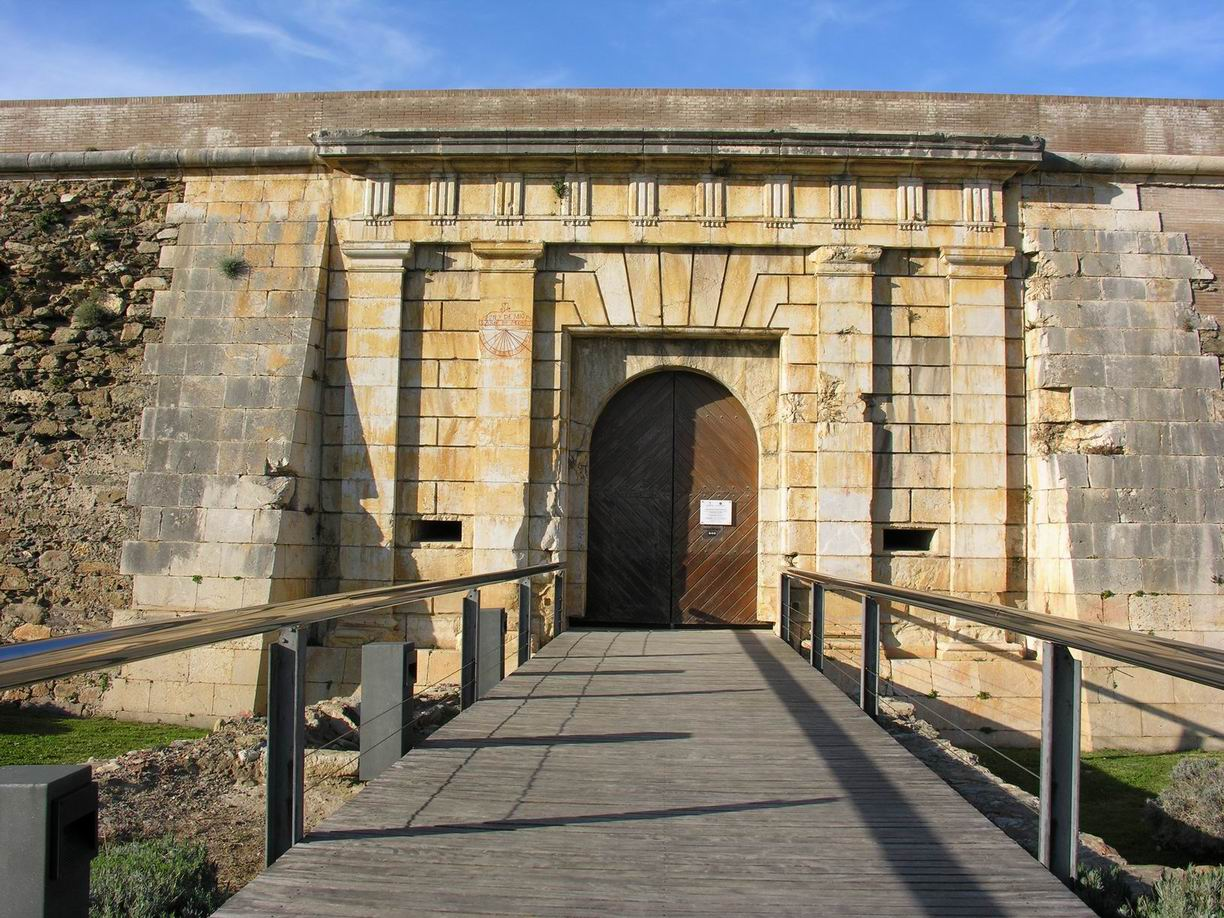
Portal del Mar (Sea Gate), Fortress of Roses.

The port of Roses was provided with a Vauban-type citadel (Ciutadella de Roses) and the satellite Castell de la Trinitat. In 1543 Charles V, Holy Roman Emperor ordered these fortifications to be built. The works were completed by 1570 and were besieged in 1645, 1693, and 1794–1795. The citadel was a modified pentagon with five bastions. Four demi-lunes covered all sides except the sea side. The Castillo de la Trinidad was an outlying 4-pointed star fort on a 60 metres (197 ft) high elevation. The citadel is located just west of Roses while the castillo tops a headland about two kilometers south-southeast of the citadel along a tightly curved promontory. A 300 metres (984 ft) high height overlooks the Castillo on the northeast.

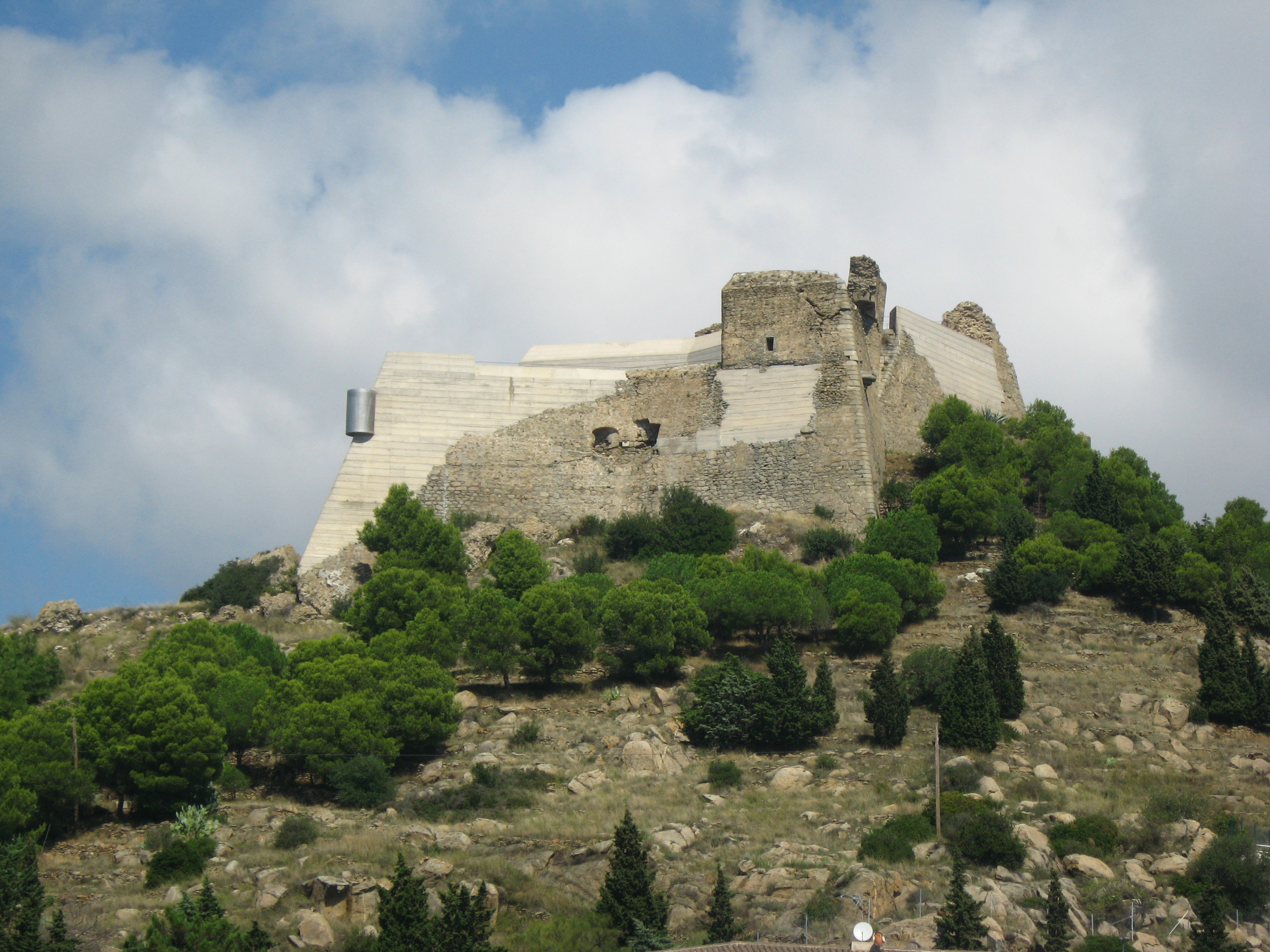
Castell de la Trinitat, an outlying fort.

On 8 November a thick fog settled on the land and a force of miquelets took the opportunity to attack Gouvion Saint-Cyr's corps while O'Daly's garrison moved against Reille's encampment. Neither action stopped the siege operation. That day, all civilians were evacuated from the town by sea. After a week of heavy rain, Reille attacked the Castillo de la Trinidad but was repulsed. The heavy guns reached Roses on 16 November and Reille's men soon dug emplacements for them, the rain having stopped. Though he had plenty of soldiers available, de Vives declined to mount a relief expedition. Álvarez tried to march to the assistance of Roses from Girona, but he was stopped at the Fluvià River.

The Italians successfully stormed into the town on 26 November. This allowed Reille to construct a water-front battery which threatened the British warships. Around this time, O'Daly was reinforced by one battalion of regulars. On the 28th, Reille summoned the fortress to surrender, but O'Daly refused. Cochrane arrived and assumed command of the Castillo which was held by Spaniards and sailors from the British squadron. On 30 November, Pino's men tried to storm the Castillo without success. After this repulse, Reille ignored the position and concentrated on reducing the citadel.

The French bombardment soon smashed a breach in the fortress walls. On 3 December, the Spanish commander sent 500 men to seize the most deadly of the breaching batteries. This assault failed with heavy losses and the attackers returned to their positions in disarray. On the 4th, Reille's trenches were 200 yards (183 m) from the walls and his troops began making preparations to mount a full-dress assault. O'Daly thereupon surrendered unconditionally and on 5 December, 2,366 Spanish soldiers laid down their arms. During the siege, the Spanish suffered about 700 additional casualties. At noon on the day of the capitulation, after the Catalan and Spanish colours were lowered, Cochrane abandoned the castle, destroying its landward bastion and tower with gunpowder from the Imperieuse, and embarked its 180 defenders. Heavy artillery fire prevented the British squadron from rescuing the rest of the garrison. The Franco-Italians lost about 1,000 killed, wounded, and died of disease.

== Results ==
Having lost an entire month in reducing Roses, it was imperative that the Imperial corps get through to Duhesme, whose supply situation was becoming critical. There were two roads that Gouvion Saint-Cyr might use to reach Barcelona. The coastal road was blocked and was within range of Cochrane's squadron. The defiant defenders of Girona stood in the path of the inland road. Hoping to convince de Vives that he wanted to besiege Girona, the French general arrived in front of that city with 15,000 infantry and 1,500 cavalry. Sending back his artillery and baggage train, Gouvion Saint-Cyr led his troops into the mountains the next day. Cutting his way through a force of miquelets on the 12th, his column bypassed Girona and reached the inland highway at Sant Celoni on the 15th. This set the stage for the showdown Battle of Cardadeu on 16 December 1808.

== Aftermath ==
Napoleon's invasion of Spain proceeded with the Battle of Gamonal.

== See also ==
- Timeline of the Peninsular War

== Bibliography ==
- Gates, David (2002). The Spanish Ulcer: A History of the Peninsular War. London: Pimlico. ISBN 0-7126-9730-6.
- Goode, Dominic (2010). "Fortresses". fortified-places.com.
- Nafziger, George (1808). "Spanish Army of Cataluna" (PDF). Archived from the original (PDF) on 21 January 2019.
- Ostermann, Georges (1987). "Pérignon: The Unknown Marshal". In Chandler, David G. (ed.). Napoleon's Marshals. New York: Macmillan. ISBN 0-02-905930-5.
- Prats, Bernard (2007). "Bataille du Boulou (Fin)" (in French). Archived from the original on 12 October 2007.
- Rickard, J. (2008r). "Siege of Rosas, 6 November 1808". historyofwar.com. Archived from the original on 29 September 2020.
- Rickard, J. (2008c). "Battle of Cardadeu, 16 December 1808". historyofwar.com. Archived from the original on 29 September 2020.
- Rickard, J. (2008b). "Capture of Barcelona, 29 February 1808". historyofwar.com. Archived from the original on 21 February 2020.
- Rickard, J. (2008s). "Siege of Barcelona, 1 August-17 December 1808". historyofwar.com. Archived from the original on 30 December 2019.
- Smith, Digby (1998). The Napoleonic Wars Data Book. London: Greenhill. ISBN 1-85367-276-9.
