= Battle of Molins de Rei =

1808 battle during the Peninsular War

- Part of Peninsular War
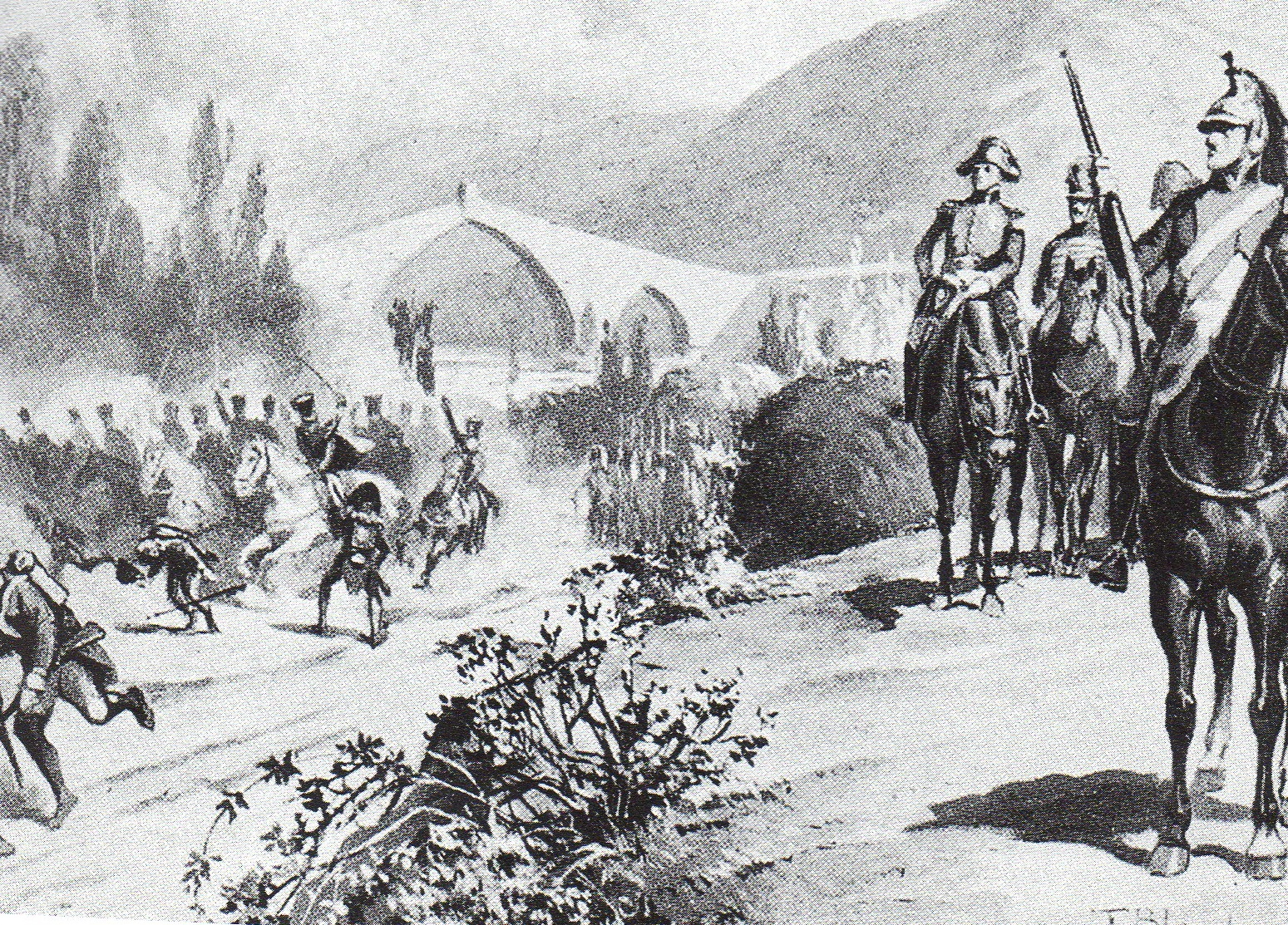
- Picture of the Battle of Molins de Rei shows the Pont del Diable in the background. The bridge is actually 12 km. north of Molins de Rei in Martorell.
Date	21 December 1808
Location	Molins de Rei, Catalonia, Spain 41°24′50″N 2°0′57″E
Result	French-allied victory

Belligerents
(France) First French Empire (Kingdom of Italy (Napoleonic)) Kingdom of Italy; Kingdom of Naples (Switzerland) Swiss Confederation	Kingdom of Spain

Commanders and leaders
(France) L. Gouvion Saint-Cyr (France) Joseph Souham (France) Joseph Chabran (Kingdom of Italy (Napoleonic)) Domenico Pino (Kingdom of Naples) Louis Chabot	(Spain) Juan de Vives (Spain) Theodor von Reding (Spain) Conde Caldagues (surrendered)

Units involved
(France) VII Corps	(Spain) Army of Catalonia

Strength
14,000	15,000

Casualties and losses
400	2,200; 25 guns

Peninsular War: Napoleon's invasion
current battle

The Battle of Molins de Rei or Battle of Molins de Rey or Battle of Molins del Rey (21 December 1808) saw an Imperial French corps led by Laurent Gouvion Saint-Cyr attack a Spanish army temporarily led by Theodor von Reding and the Conde de Caldagues because its commander Juan Miguel de Vives y Feliu was absent. Saint-Cyr outmaneuvered his opponents, distracting them with a false attack in front while sending the bulk of his force across Llobregat River in a turning movement around the Spanish right flank. The Spanish defensive lines crumbled and the French captured 1,200 soldiers, all the Spanish artillery and Caldagues himself. The Peninsular War engagement was fought near Molins de Rei, located 15 kilometres (9 mi) west of Barcelona, Catalonia, Spain.

The Dos de Mayo Uprising caught the Imperial French occupation forces in Spain off guard. By the end of August 1808, the Franco-Italian garrison of Barcelona found itself isolated and in danger of capture. Emperor Napoleon soon assembled a substantial army, entrusted it to Saint-Cyr, and directed his general to relieve Barcelona. After a risky campaign, Saint-Cyr defeated a Spanish force at Cardadeu and reached Barcelona. Finding his opponents holding a strong position behind the Llobregat, Saint-Cyr marched out of Barcelona and resolved to drive them away.

== Background ==
The Corunna campaign started with the Battle of Cardedeu.

=== Strategic situation ===
After the Treaties of Tilsit in 1807, Emperor Napoleon began to exhibit such signs of megalomania that his brilliant diplomat Charles Maurice de Talleyrand-Périgord resigned as foreign minister. Undeterred, Napoleon got King Charles IV of Spain and his son Prince Ferdinand into his custody and then tricked both into abdicating. Then he announced that his brother Joseph Bonaparte would reign as the Spanish king. Meanwhile, on various pretexts, Napoleon moved significant bodies of Imperial French troops into Spain. In February 1808, these soldiers seized Barcelona and many border fortresses. On 2 May 1808, street riots in Madrid were put down with extreme measures by Marshal Joachim Murat and 20,000 Imperial troops. Very soon, the Spanish people rose in rebellion against the French occupation forces.

Guillaume Philibert Duhesme commanded the Corps of Observation of the Eastern Pyrenees which numbered 12,714 men. The 1st Division under Joseph Chabran was made up of one Swiss and seven French battalions and counted 6,045 soldiers. The 2nd Division under Teodoro Lechi had 4,596 troops in four Italian and two Neapolitan battalions. The cavalry brigade led by Bertrand Bessières numbered 825 troopers in two French provisional regiments, while the cavalry brigade commanded by François Xavier de Schwarz counted 892 Italian and Neapolitan horsemen. There were also 356 artillerymen and wagon drivers. Napoleon expected Duhesme to help capture Valencia and Lleida as well as hold Barcelona. These instructions proved to be hopelessly optimistic, given Duhesme's limited numbers and the intensity of the spreading revolt.

The Battles of El Bruch were two unsuccessful attempts to clear the El Bruc pass, first by Schwarz and then by Chabran. Taking half his corps, Duhesme tried to clear the road to France, but in the Battle of Gerona his troops were unable to storm the city. Napoleon realized that Duhesme needed help, so he scraped together 8,000 second-class French soldiers into a new division and assigned it to Honoré Charles Reille. First, Reille marched to the relief of the Sant Ferran Castle at Figueres, then he tried to capture the port of Roses (Rosas) but failed. In late July, Reille and Duhesme converged on Girona from north and south and began the Second Siege of Gerona. This operation progressed so slowly that Conde de Caldagues attacked the siege lines and forced the French to withdraw. Reille retired to Figueres with little trouble, but the miquelets, a Catalan militia, harassed Duhesme's soldiers unmercifully. Duhesme had to abandon his artillery and wagon train before his troops escaped to Barcelona on 20 August 1808.

=== Operations ===
When Napoleon finally understood the scope of the problem in Catalonia, he made some significant changes. Already on 17 August 1808, Napoleon appointed Laurent Gouvion Saint-Cyr to be his new commander in Catalonia. Saint-Cyr was reinforced by 18,000 men from the garrison of Italy, though it would be weeks before they could arrive. Unlike Reille's motley soldiers, these included crack troops in the French division of Joseph Souham and the Italian division of Domenico Pino. There was also a small Franco-Italian division under Louis François Jean Chabot, an Italian cavalry brigade led by Jacques Fontane, and the French 24th Dragoon Regiment.

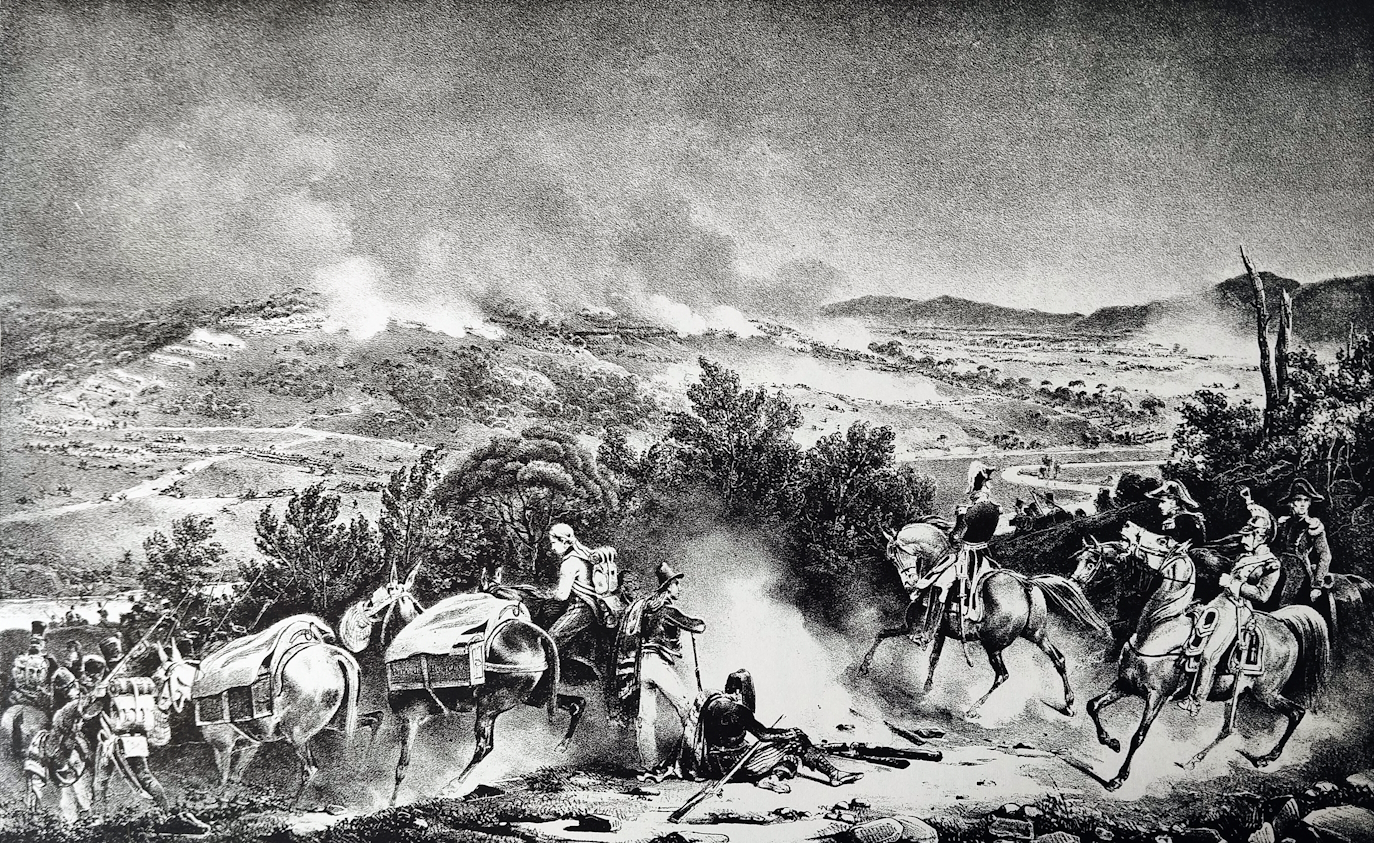
Battle of Cardedeu, 16 December 1808

Meanwhile, 10,000 Spanish regulars were idle in the Balearic Islands because their commander Juan Miguel de Vives y Feliu was afraid that his new British allies planned to seize the islands. After the soldiers threatened to mutiny, Vives finally allowed Marquis del Palacio to sail to the mainland with 5,000 men. These troops landed in Catalonia by 23 July. The local authorities appointed Del Palacio the new Captain General of Catalonia and he opened a blockade of Barcelona. About 10,000 Spanish troops under Theodor von Reding from the Province of Granada were approaching Catalonia. A division from the Province of Aragon under Luis Rebolledo de Palafox y Melci, 1st marqués de Lazán reached Lleida. Palacio remained so inert during the summer and fall that he was replaced as Captain General by Vives on 28 October. By this time the Spanish numbered 20,000 infantry and 1,000 cavalry. Vives tightened the blockade of Barcelona and finally drove the garrison within its walls on 26 November. Other than that, Vives proved to be as slow and unenterprising as Palacio.

Saint-Cyr opened the Siege of Roses on 7 November 1808 and Roses surrendered on 5 December. This removed a potential threat to the French communications. Saint-Cyr arrived before the fortress of Girona with 17,000 troops in the second week of December. He hoped to lure the Spanish garrison outside the walls, but this tactic did not work. The commander at Girona, Mariano Álvarez de Castro and Lazán refused to risk their 8,000 soldiers in the open field against Saint-Cyr's much superior force.

The French commander knew that besieging Girona would take too long, so he sent away his artillery and his wagon trains and boldly slipped past Girona, leaving Reille's division behind. Vives assumed that the French would be stalled in front of Girona. When he found that Saint-Cyr was marching through the hills, he responded by sending a division under Reding to block the French. Vives finally woke up and brought an additional brigade, though he had 24,000 troops available. Saint-Cyr completely outfoxed his opponents and arrived near the village of Cardadeu to find Vives and Reding facing him with only 9,100 soldiers and seven cannons. In the Battle of Cardadeu on 16 December Saint-Cyr utilized massive attack columns to smash through the Spanish lines. The French inflicted 2,500 casualties on their adversaries while suffering a loss of only 600. Vives became separated from his army. He fled to the coast where he was picked up by HMS Cambrian and shipped to Tarragona.

== Battle ==
=== Preparations ===
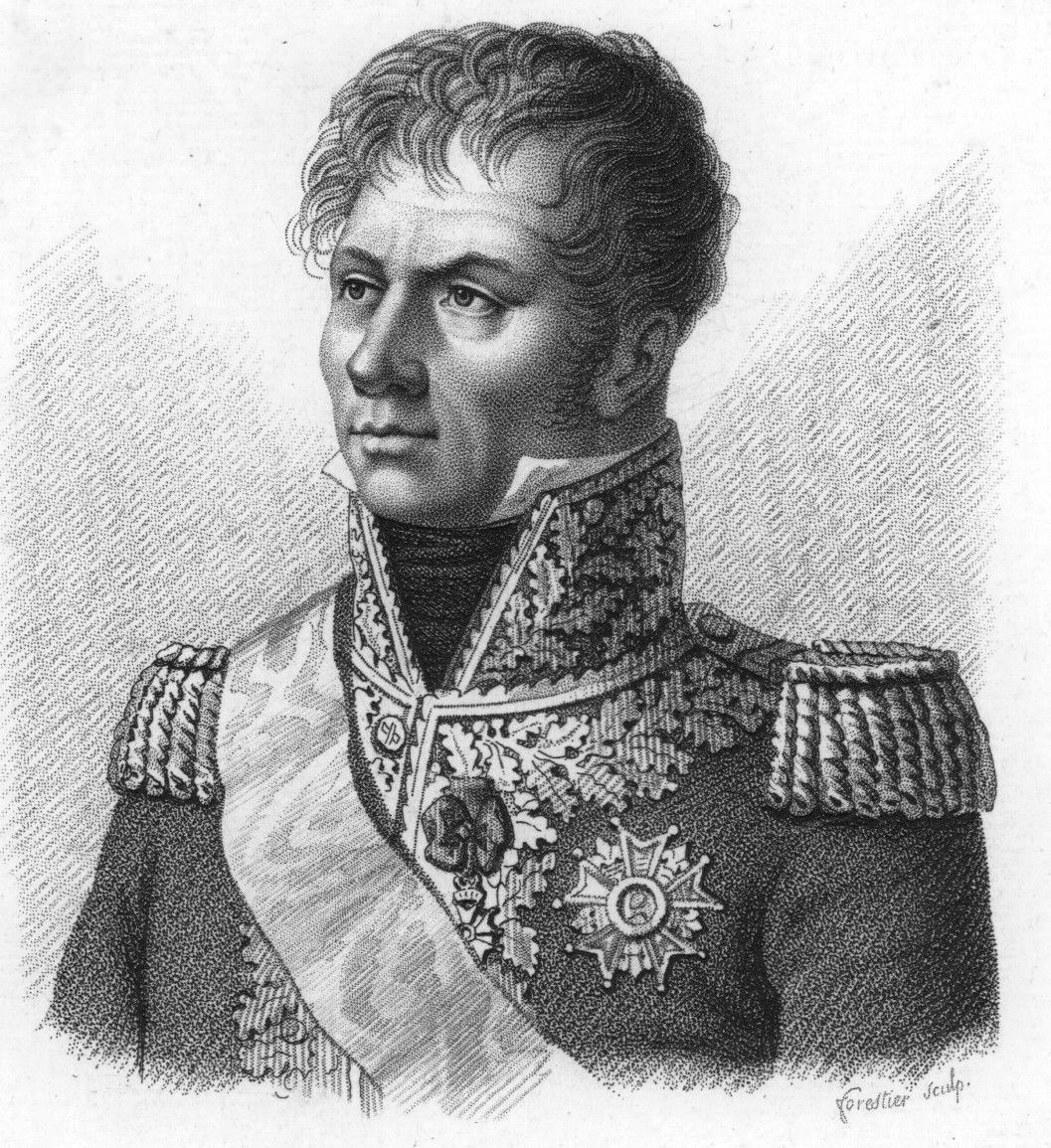
Laurent Gouvion Saint-Cyr

On 16 December, Conde de Caldagues drove off a strong sortie that was mounted by the defenders of Barcelona, but that evening he heard about the Spanish defeat at Cardedeu. Accordingly, Caldagues withdrew the blockading force behind the Llobregat River to positions from Molins de Rei on the north and Sant Boi de Llobregat on the south. During the hasty retreat, Caldagues abandoned a large food depot at Sarrià to the Imperial French. On the morning of 17 December, Saint-Cyr led his army of relief into Barcelona. To his annoyance, no soldiers from the blockaded garrison were sent out to greet his victorious soldiers. When the egotistical Duhesme finally appeared, he remarked to Saint-Cyr that his forces were not in danger and would have been able to hold out for another six weeks. Not to be outdone, the prickly Saint-Cyr produced a copy of one of Duhesme's dispatches to Marshal Louis-Alexandre Berthier stating that his garrison was in dire straits and begging for its relief. Duhesme withdrew to sulk in silence.

After being deserted by about 1,000 of his miquelets, Caldagues counted 11,000 troops. These were soon joined by Reding who brought the remnants of the force beaten at Cardedeu, 3,000–4,000 men. The lines along the Llobregat included the field fortifications built for the right wing of the blockade and they were only about 6 mi (10 km) from the Barcelona suburbs. The defenses were strong and mounted heavy guns, but were too long for an army of 15,000 soldiers. The Llobregat was fordable at many points and if the French assault came at one point it was likely to succeed. In the absence of Vives, the second-in-command Reding took control of the Spanish forces. He and the third-in-command Caldagues knew the Spanish position was weak but they were in a dilemma.

Reding and Caldagues wanted to retreat west into the very strong position at Ordal, where they planned to construct an entrenched camp. However, a withdrawal to Ordal would open the Barcelona–Lleida highway to the French. It would also allow the French to gather up the crops in the plains. Looking for some direction, Reding sent a message to Vives who was at Sitges. Vives failed to assume responsibility, leaving it to Reding to decide whether to defend or retreat. Vives' reply arrived on the night of 20–21 December. In order to demonstrate his courage in the eyes of the Catalans, Reding determined to fight.

=== Imperial forces ===
Saint-Cyr led four divisions out of the city on the windy and cold morning of 21 December 1808, leaving Duhesme to hold Barcelona with Lechi's Italian division. The Imperial forces included the divisions of Chabran, Souham, Pino, and Chabot. Chabran's division was part of Duhesme's corps which had been blockaded in Barcelona. Chabran's troops were French veterans plus one battalion of Swiss. Souham's French and Pino's Italian divisions were made up of crack troops. Chabot's division consisted of one battalion of French soldiers and two of Neapolitans. The Neapolitans were widely regarded as the worst troops in Europe. Saint-Cyr's force also included Fontane's cavalry brigade, consisting of the Italian Royal Horse Chasseurs and the 7th Italian Dragoons.

=== Action ===
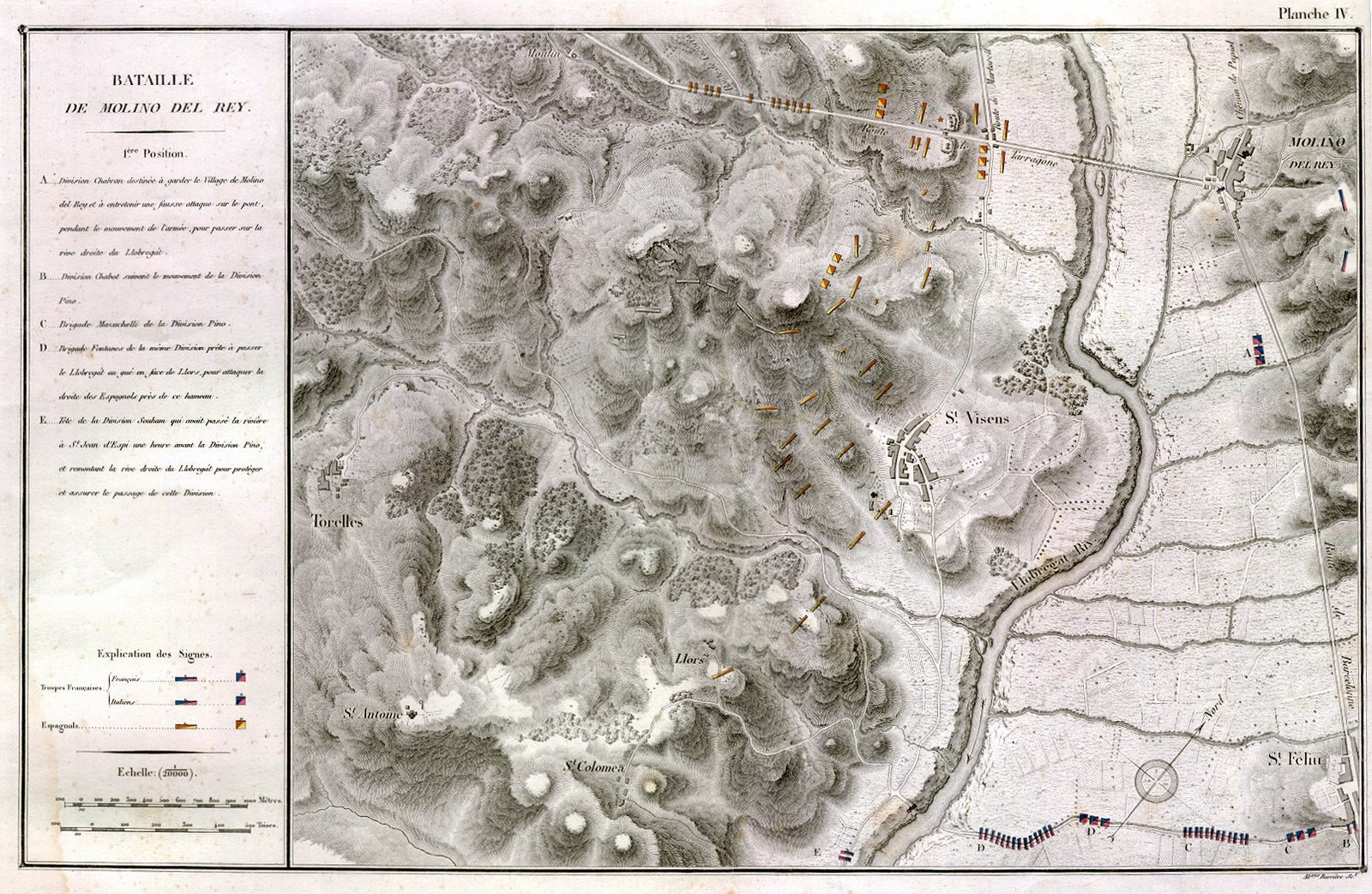
Map shows the Battle of Molins de Rei. Chabran's division feinted at the bridge at the upper right, while Saint-Cyr's main attack crossed the river at the bottom and wheeled to the right.

Saint-Cyr planned for Chabran's 4,000-man division to mount a diversionary attack on Molins de Rey bridge. While the Spanish generals were distracted, 14,000 troops in the divisions of Souham, Pino, and Chabot would cross the lower fords of the Llobregat and march against the Spanish right flank. At 5:00 am, Chabran began his feint against the Spanish left flank. Reding was fooled and reinforced his left by drawing some troops from his right flank. At 6:00 am the real Imperial assault began when Saint-Cyr ordered his other three divisions to advance.

Souham's division crossed at the ford of Sant Joan Despí. The Spanish troops of the center began to march downhill to oppose Souham, but they flinched and did not push their attack. The divisions of Pino and Chabot crossed farther south at San Feliu against weak opposition. The Imperial French soon cracked the overextended Spanish line in several locations. Chabot's small division on the extreme left swept completely around the Spanish right flank. As Chabot's troops moved deeper into the Spanish rear, the troops fighting against Pino and Souham were compelled to yield good defensive terrain and fall back. The Imperial advance rolled up the broken Spanish left and center, thrusting them toward the north in a confused mass.

Soon crowds of retreating soldiers began to appear in Chabran's front. This was the moment for Chabran to convert his false attack into an actual assault, but he hesitated. By the time Chabran's troops splashed across the Llobregat, most of the Spanish troops had fled beyond their reach. Vives belatedly arrived on the battlefield at this time. Seeing his troops running for their lives, Vives immediately decamped. Saint-Cyr unleashed his dragoons in pursuit of his enemies and they caught the Conde de Caldagues when his horse collapsed. The French captured 1,200 men, 25 cannons, a magazine containing 3,000,000 cartridges, and many muskets thrown away by the fleeing Spanish soldiers. Another source claimed that the Spanish sustained losses of 1,000 soldiers killed and wounded plus 1,200 men, 25 guns, and one color captured. The French lost 400 killed and wounded out of a total of 18,000 men and 48 guns. Historian Charles Oman wrote that the French were weak in artillery and that the field guns captured from the Spanish proved very useful. He noted that Saint-Cyr's troops brought no guns with them and that much of Duhesme's artillery was lost in the retreat after the Second Siege of Gerona.

== Aftermath ==
The Corunna campaign proceeded with the Battle of Sahagún.

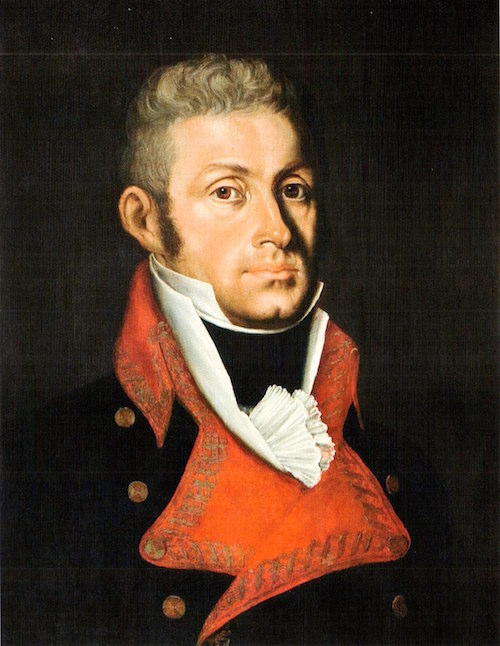
Theodor von Reding

Most of the routed Spanish soldiers fled to Tarragona for sanctuary, while others headed for Lleida or Tortosa. In their wake, the victorious Imperial French troops occupied the watershed of the Llobregat and areas to the west, including the important defile at Ordal. Souham's division took post at El Vendrell, Pino's at Sitges and Vilafranca del Penedès, Chabran's at Martorell, and Chabot's at Sant Sadurní d'Anoia. Saint-Cyr believed securing enough food for his army was his first priority and reopening his supply line with France was his second priority. French efforts to resupply Barcelona by sea were stymied by a Royal Navy blockade. Meanwhile, the inland route was blocked by Spanish-held Girona and Hostalric. Saint-Cyr found other reasons for pausing in his victorious march. The winter campaigning exhausted his soldiers and they needed to recuperate. The Spanish troops under Alvarez and Lazán harassed Reille's division near Girona.

Saint-Cyr might have tried to capture Tarragona, but he believed that he would need a siege train and a large supply of ammunition in order to reduce that powerful fortress. He was unaware that most of the miquelets had gone home, the regular infantry were becoming mutinous, and the Catalan people were in a state of hysteria, howling for scapegoats. In Lleida, a local man named Gomez seized power and began executing anyone whom he suspected of treason. Reding finally put a stop to this by sending a battalion to the city to arrest and execute the tyrant. When the pressure from Saint-Cyr relaxed, the Catalans began to rally. The second echelon of Reding's Granadan troops arrived at the front and reinforcements also came from Mallorca. The Granadans included the Santa Fé and 1st Antequera Regiments while the Mallorcans consisted of the Beschard Swiss Regiment and the Palma Militia.

The Spanish authorities induced the incompetent Vives to resign and replaced him with Reding, who was at least courageous though not brilliant. The miquelets returned to duty so that one month after Molins de Rei, the Army of Catalonia counted 30,000 men. On 1 January 1809, Lazán ambushed and mauled the 4th Battalion of the French 2nd Line Infantry Regiment, killing and wounding 200 men and capturing 90 more. When Reille and 2,500 troops tried to exact revenge he met with a stinging repulse. However, Lazán soon withdrew his division from Catalonia and marched to help his brother José de Palafox y Melci whose army was fighting the Second Siege of Zaragoza. Saint-Cyr kept his troops busy gathering food supplies and suppressing the miquelets. The Imperial troops cleared the El Bruc pass and captured Montserrat but did not occupy it. Meanwhile, several supply ships managed to evade the British blockade and reach Barcelona. It was only later that a system of convoys was begun. The next large engagement in Catalonia was the Battle of Valls on 25 February 1809.

== See also ==
- Timeline of the Peninsular War

== Bibliography ==
- Bodart, Gaston (1908). Militär-historisches Kriegs-Lexikon (1618-1905).
- Gates, David (2002). The Spanish Ulcer: A History of the Peninsular War. London: Pimlico. ISBN 0-7126-9730-6.
- Oman, Sir Charles William Chadwick (1902a). A History of the Peninsular War. Vol. I. Oxford: Clarendon Press.
- Oman, Sir Charles William Chadwick (1902b). A History of the Peninsular War. Vol. II. Oxford: Clarendon Press.
- Smith, Digby (1998). The Napoleonic Wars Data Book. London: Greenhill. ISBN 1-85367-276-9.
