= Second Siege of Girona (Peninsular War) =

1808 siege during the Peninsular War

Second Siege of Girona (1808)
- Part of Peninsular War
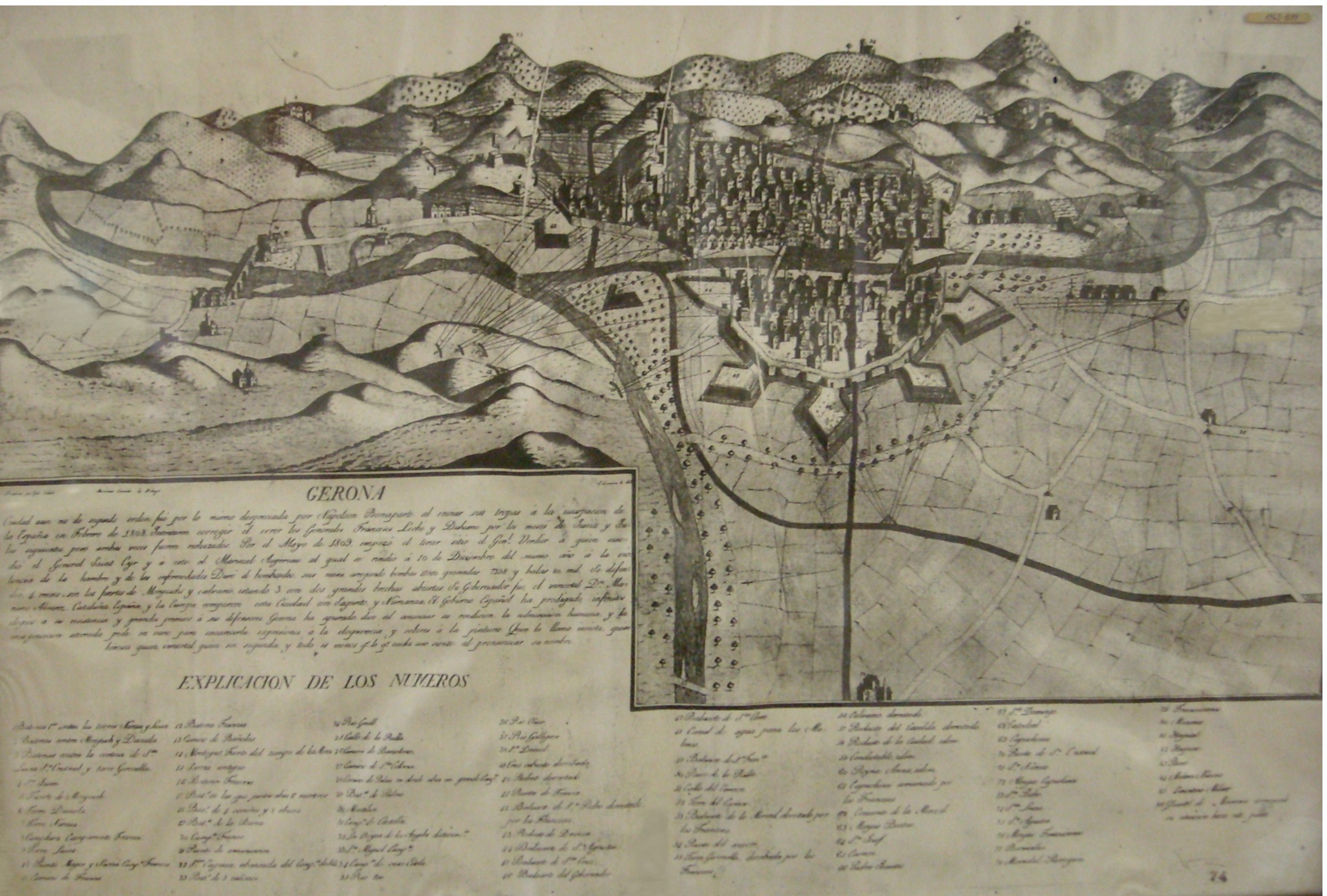
- Image of Girona after 1809
| Date | 24 July to 16 August 1808 |
| Location | Girona, Catalonia, Spain 41°58′N 2°49′E |
| Result | Spanish victory |

Belligerents
| (France) First French Empire | Kingdom of Spain |

Commanders and leaders
| (France) Guillaume Duhesme (France) Honoré Reille | (Spain) Brigadier, Count of Caldagues (Spain) |

Strength
| 13,000 | O'Donovan: 3,750; Caldagues: 7,000; 6,000 |

Casualties and losses
| 271, all guns | Light |

Peninsular War: Spanish uprising 1808
current battle

The second siege of Girona was the second unsuccessful French attempt to capture the city of Girona (spelled "Gerona" in Castilian) during the Peninsular War, part of the Napoleonic Wars.

General Duhesme's siege operations were interrupted by the Count of Caldagues's attack on 16 August, which ended the siege, leaving behind a considerable amount of materiel and provisions.

== Background ==
Located halfway between the Franco-Spanish border and Barcelona, Girona was considered critical to maintaining the French forces' lines of communication from France to Barcelona, where General Guillaume Philibert Duhesme was virtually cut off from the rest of the Grande Armée in Spain by thousands of Catalan miquelets (militia), supported by a few Spanish regular troops.

A few weeks previously, on 20 and 21 June 1808, General Duhesme had tried to storm the Spanish garrison, commanded by lieutenant colonel O'Donovan. Having failed, Duhesme then mounted a formal siege operation.

== Siege ==
An Imperial French corps led by Guillaume Philibert Duhesme attempted to capture the city of Girona and its Spanish garrison, nominally commanded by Julian Bolivar, but in reality the defence was being conducted by Colonel La Valeta of the Barcelona Volunteers and Lieutenant-colonel Richard O'Donovan, of the 6th Dragoons, then assigned to the Ultonia Regiment.

The French began regular siege operations, but were forced to withdraw when a Spanish force led by Brigadier, the Conde de Caldagues, commander-in-chief of the Army of Gerona, and commander-in-chief of the Borbon Infantry Regiment, attacked their lines from the rear.

== Breaking the siege ==
Caldagues had left Martorell on 6 July with three companies of fusiliers of the Regiment of Soria, a company of grenadiers of the Borbon Regiment, two thousand migueletes and somatenes under colonel Baget, and three cannons. By the time he reached Gerona, on the 13th, his division numbered some 3,300 men and plus five cannons.

Caldagues met up with the commanders of his forces and, together with two of the colonels of the garrison at Gerona, Lieutenant-colonel O’Donovan of the Ultonia Regiment and Colonel La Valeta of the Barcelona Volunteers, held a council of war to devise the plan of attack.

Lieutenant-colonel Milans de Bosch, who was to lead the first column, had 500–800 migueletes under his command.

Meanwhile, Joan Clarós, a retired captain of the regular army, was stationed up at the hermitage of Los Angeles in the mountains outside Gerona with some 2,500 men, including somatenes and regular troops of the Royal Guards and the Walloon Guards sent from Rosas.

On the morning of the 16th, 1,400 troops of the garrison surprised the besiegers, the Barcelona Volunteers under La Valeta leading the attack and the Ultonia Regiment, under Major Henry O’Donnell, supporting.

The dispatch, dated 22 August, while highly praising the combatants who took active part in the fighting, severely criticised the former military governor of Menorca, Domingo Traggia, marqués de Palacio, who had come over to the mainland from Mahón, accompanied by Baget, landing at Tarragona with some 5,000 troops and 37 pieces of artillery in order to take up his new appointment as Captain-General of Catalonia, for refusing to intervene with his regiment of hussars, "famously experienced in warfare, and in better condition than any other force in Spain". The dispatch went on to add that such intervention would have resulted in the total defeat of the enemy forces.

The official figures of wounded and dead among the Spanish forces were 22 dead and 108 wounded, including Enrique O'Donnell, of the Ultonia Regiment.

== Aftermath ==
Duhesme's men were harassed during their return to Barcelona by the Spanish army and the British navy. By the time the French forces arrived in Barcelona, they were without artillery and badly demoralized. Meanwhile, Emperor Napoleon I assembled a new corps under Général de division Laurent Gouvion Saint-Cyr to relieve Duhesme from his predicament. The next action of the Peninsular War would be the siege of Roses, from 7 November to 5 December 1808.

== See also ==
- Battle of Gerona (1808)
- Third siege of Gerona (1809)
- Timeline of the Peninsular War

== Bibliography ==
- Fremont-Barnes, Gregory (2002). The Peninsular War, 1807-1814. Oxford : Osprey. ISBN 9781841763705.
- Hamilton, Thomas (1829). Annals of the Peninsular Campaigns: From MDCCCVIII to MDCCCXIV. W. Blackwood – via Internet Archives.
- Rickard, J. (2008). "Second siege of Gerona, 24 July–16 August 1808". historyofwar.com.
