= Carlo Balabio =

Italian general

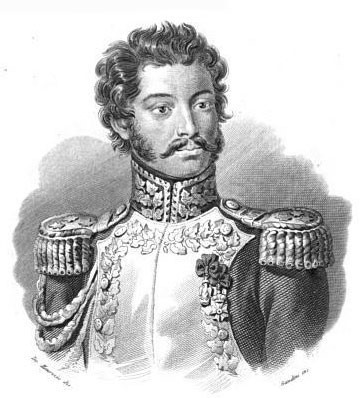
- Born: 1759; Milan, Duchy of Milan
- Died: 1838 (aged 79); Milan, Kingdom of Lombardy-Venetia
- Military career
- Allegiance: Kingdom of Italy (1798–1814)
- Rank: Division general
- Conflicts: French Revolutionary Wars; Battle of Novi; Siege of Genoa; Napoleonic Wars; Battle of Ulm; Peninsular War

Carlo Balabio (1759–1838) was an Italian general and cavalry commander who served the Kingdom of Italy during the Napoleonic Wars.

== Military service ==
Balabio was born in Milan on 14 April 1759 to a rich banking family. He studied first at Monza and then at Pavia, where he obtained a law degree. Initially beginning as a criminal lawyer, he was persuaded by his family to enter commerce and worked in business with the Commissioner of the Austrian Army in Italy. Forced out of business by the French invasion of 1796 he then entered military service as a commander of a detachment of cavalry, armed at his own expense with what remained of his fortune. In less than four months he was promoted Captain and then Caposquadrone.

By the beginning of the War of the Second Coalition in 1799 he was an officer in the Cisalpine Republic acting as Aide de Camp (ADC) to Jean Victor Marie Moreau, then Barthélemy Catherine Joubert during the campaign in Northern Italy. After Joubert's death at the catastrophic Battle of Novi, Balabio fled with his troops and joined the forces under André Masséna, distinguishing himself as ADC during the siege of Genoa 1800, for which he was promoted Colonel.

In 1805, he commanded the 2nd Hussar Regiment (2.o reggimento Ussari Cisalpino) in the Kingdom of Italy and Guides as part of Domenico Pino's Division during the planned invasion of England in France. He took part in the campaign in Germany against Karl Mack von Leiberich that led to the Battle of Ulm, before returning to Italy. Based in Cremona, his regiment of hussars was converted to dragoons, taking the name Dragoni Napoleone (Napoleon's Dragoons), and the other regiment (the 1st), commanded by Colonel Pietro Luigi Viani, was simultaneously converted to dragoons and named "della Regina".

In 1806, his regiment served under Massena in the conquest of Naples. Promoted brigadier general, he was appointed commander of the cavalry division under Pino in 1807 and moved to Pomerania to face the troops of King Gustav IV Adolf of Sweden.

In 1808, he commanded the Italian Cavalry brigade attached to Pino's Division as part of Laurent de Gouvion Saint-Cyr's VII Corps in Spain, and saw action at the Siege of Gerona, and the actions at Hostalrich on 15 December and Cardadeu on 16 December. In February 1809, he served at the Battle of Valls. Unable to continue in active service, he was replaced by Giuseppe Federico Palombini in 1809 and made Deposito Generale in the Department of Lodi.

On 23 November 1811, Balabio was appointed inspector general of the cavalry. Following the virtual destruction of the mounted arm of the Kingdom of Italy in 1812, Balabio had the task of reforming the remnants for the 1813 campaign. At the end of the war he was stationed in Mantua, after the peace he retired as major general.

Balabio was married to Teresa Berra. Their daughter Maria Balabio was married to a Russian general Danil Andreyevich Boyko.

Balabio died in Milan, almost in poverty, on 8 August 1838.
