= Juan Miguel de Vives =

- Born: Juan Miguel de Vives y Feliu c. 1745; Girona, Spain
- Died: 27 April 1809 Ciudad Rodrigo, Spain
- Allegiance: Kingdom of Spain
- Branch: Infantry
- Rank: Captain General
- Conflicts: War of the Pyrenees; Battle of Boulou; Battle of the Black Mountain; Peninsular War; Battle of Cardadeu; Battle of Molins de Rey
- Other work: Governor of Mallorca

Juan Miguel de Vives y Feliu, in Catalan: Joan Miquel Vives i Feliu, (c. 1745 — 27 April 1809) was a Spanish general.

== Early career ==
In 1794 he capably led a division against the French in the War of the Pyrenees. He led his division at the battles of Boulou and the Black Mountain in the eastern Pyrenees.

In 1795, José de Urrutia, the captain general of Catalonia gave him the command of 20,000 migueletes which, together with volunteers raised in Valencia by the Marquis of La Romana, expulsed the French forces from Cerdanya, in the Catalan Pyrenees.

In 1796 he was appointed military governor of Cartagena, and in 1799 he was appointed Captain General of Mallorca.

== Peninsular War ==
On 30 June 1808, soon after the outbreak of the war, his second-in-command, the Marquis del Palacio, who had taken up the post of governor of Minorca earlier that month, joined the open mutiny of the Aragonese and Catalan battalions of the corps of 10,000 men stationed in the Balearic Islands, garrisoned at Majorca and Minorca, demanding to be transferred to Barcelona to take up arms against the French, finally set sail from Port Mahon to mainland Spain.

Vives had been reluctant to leave Port Mahon without troops due to his "deeply rooted idea" that the English would once again take over Minorca, as they had done for the greater part of the 18th century. While the Aragonese regiment landed near Tortosa and marched for Saragossa, the bulk of the expeditionary force, nearly 5,000 strong, was put ashore in Catalonia between 19 and 23 July. The Marquis del Palacio was appointed Captain General of Catalonia shortly thereafter, Vives having turned down the appointment in June.

The following October, when the Marquis del Palacio was recalled for having lain idle at Tarragona all through September, the Central Junta again offered Vives the post, which this time he accepted, taking up his new posting ten days after leaving Majorca. His predecessor, and former second-in-command of the Balearic Islands, the Marquis del Palacio then accused Vives of being a Bonapartist.

On 1 October 1808, Floridablanca signed the order for lieutenant general Reding to head urgently for Catalonia.

At the beginning of November 1808, Vives's Army of Catalonia numbered 20,033 men, of which 780 are cavalry. His divisions were led by Brigadier-General Álvarez (Vanguard Division); General Conde de Caldagues (1st Division); General Laguna (2nd Division); General La Serna (3rd Division) and General Milans (4th Division), with another 15,000 troops of General Reding's Army of Granada marching towards Catalonia, which would arrive towards the end of the month.

Vives was in charge of the blockade of Barcelona and its French Imperial garrison led by Guillaume Philibert Duhesme. He failed to take vigorous action at Barcelona and was defeated by a second column of French troops under Laurent Gouvion Saint-Cyr at the battles of Cardadeu and Molins de Rey in December.

On resigning his command, Vives was replaced as captain general of Catalonia by Reding the following January, Vives was appointed captain general of Old Castile, post he held at his death, the following year, at Ciudad Rodrigo.

== Commentary ==
When writing about his Peninsular War service, historian David G. Chandler called Vives "an aged, overcautious, Anglophobic booby".

== Bibliography ==
- Adzerias i Causi, Gustau (2009). "La Batalla de Cardadeu, Segona Part" (PDF) (in Spanish).
- Chandler, David G. (1966). The Campaigns of Napoleon. New York, NY: Macmillan.
- Smith, Digby (1998). The Napoleonic Wars Data Book. London: Greenhill. ISBN 1-85367-276-9.
