= Count of Caldagues =

Spanish commander of the Peninsular War

Raimundo Caldagues (Count)
- Born: c. 1752; Auvergne, France
- Died: c. 1824
- Allegiance: Kingdom of France; Kingdom of Spain
- Branch: French Army; Spanish Army
- Rank: Lieutenant Colonel; Lieutenant General
- Conflicts: American Revolutionary War; French Revolutionary Wars; War of the Pyrenees; Napoleonic Wars; Peninsular War
- Awards: Order of Saint Louis

Raimundo Caldagues y Remond, Count of Caldagues (Note: The title was French, not Spanish: comte de Caldagues. Caldagues (Caldégas in French) was a hamlet in the commune of Bourg-Madame in the Pyrénées-Orientales department in southern France, close to the Spanish border. It originally formed part of the Principality of Catalonia belonging to the Count of Barcelona, until it changed hands following the Treaty of the Pyrenees (1659).) (c. 1752 – c. 1824) was a French military commander of the Spanish army who distinguished himself leading the relief force at the second siege of Girona (16 August 1808). He was promoted to field marshal the following day.

Charles Oman, in his A History of the Peninsular War, Volume 2 (1902), wrote that the capture of Caldagues, following the Battle of Molins de Rei (December 1808) was a "great misfortune" for the Army of Catalonia, as Caldagues was "the one first-rate officer in their ranks".

== Early career ==
In 1781, Caldagues serving in the American Revolutionary War, as part of the Expédition Particulière, the expeditionary force commanded by Count Rochambeau, was promoted to lieutenant colonel.

Escaping from the French Revolution, he emigrated to Spain and on 9 June 1793, was appointed sargento mayor (staff officer) of the Legión Róyale, a Spanish military unit composed of émigré troops.

During the War of the Pyrenees, Caldagues fought at the Battle of Truillas (September 1793) and at the defence of Le Boulou. In January 1794, he was promoted to colonel of the Regimiento Real Rousillon and, on that regiment being dissolved, he was transferred to the 2nd Battalion of Legión de la Reine (1 June), saw combat at Pont de Molins on 17 November 1794, and serving throughout the duration of the war.

Once the war was over and the émigré units were dissolved, Caldagues was appointed colonel and second-in-command of the Borbón Regiment (April 1796), a Spanish regiment of French royalist volunteers, and in May 1798, he was appointed its commander-in-chief. In October 1802, he was promoted to brigadier in the same promotion as Joaquín Blake and two of the Palafox brothers, Luis Palafox, Marquis of Lazán and Francisco Palafox.

== Peninsular War ==
At the outbreak of the war, Caldagues was garrisoned at Menorca and came over to Tarragona as part of the units that would be incorporated into the newly formed Army of the Right (Ejército de la derecha), previously known as the Army of Catalonia (Ejército de Cataluña), under the orders of the recently appointed captain-general of Catalonia, Juan Miguel de Vives. Brigadier Caldagues was given the command of its first division, the Llobregat Division, comprising 4,698 infantrymen and 400 horse, plus six cannon.

=== Second siege of Gerona ===
As commander-in-chief of the Army of Gerona, and commander-in-chief of the Borbon Infantry Regiment, he organised his division into four columns.

Caldagues had left Martorell on 6 July with three companies of fusiliers of the Regiment of Soria, a company of grenadiers of the Borbon Regiment, two thousand migueletes and somatenes under Colonel Baget, who would form the second column, and three cannons. By the time he reached Gerona, on the 13th, his division numbered some 3,300 men and plus five cannons. There he was joined by Lieutenant-colonel Milans de Bosch, who was to lead the first column, with 500–800 migueletes under his command. Meanwhile, Joan Clarós, a retired captain of the regular army, was to be stationed up at the hermitage of Los Angeles in the mountains outside Gerona with some 2,500 men, including somatenes and regular troops of the Royal Guards and the Walloon Guards sent from Rosas.

Caldagues was promoted to field marshal the following day.

=== Other actions ===
The following month, on 2 September 1808, Caldagues's troops prevented General Duhesme's French force of 6,000 troops from crossing the Llobregat river at Molins de Rei, and later, in mid-October, at the head of 3,000 infantry, two squadrons of cavalry and six cannon, he defeated another force of some 2,000–4,000 Italian troops under Milosewitz at the combat of San Cugat, capturing 300 men forcing the rest to retreat to Barcelona without their convoy. As a result, Duhesme decided not to send out any more sorties, despite the scarcity of provisions.

When news of Marshal Saint-Cyr's victory at the Battle of Cardedeu (16 December) reached Caldagues, he decided to withdraw his blockade of Barcelona and return to his lines behind the Llobregat, where he regrouped his 11,000–12,000 troops, with Reding joining him with some 3,000–4,000 troops that remained of the Spanish forces routed at Cardedeu.

Caldagues was finally captured at the Battle of Molins de Rei (21 December 1808), and interned in France, where he remained prisoner until the end of the war.

== Post-war career ==
On his return to Spain, in 1814, he served under Castaños, in the Observation Army of the Right (Ejército de Observación de la Derecha) during the Hundred Days (March–July 1815).

On 26 June 1815, the Duke of Angoulême appointed him military commander of the department of Ariège (department) and the command of the 10th Military district (Toulouse), post previously held by Jules de Polignac, future prime minister of France under Charles X. He was awarded the Order of Saint Louis on the 21 July 1816.

Fernando VII promoted him to lieutenant general in 1816.
