= Gaspar Gómez de la Serna =

Spanish army officer (1776–1808)

- Born: 10 May 1776; Castilruiz, Soria, Castilla y León
- Died: 22 October 1808 (aged 48) Tarragona
- Conflicts: War of the Pyrenees; War of the Oranges; Peninsular War

Gaspar Gómez de la Serna y Pérez (1760–1808) was a Spanish military commander.

== Early career ==
In 1792, La Serna enlisted as a second-lieutenant in the Soria Regiment of Provincial Militias, seeing action in Navarra during the War of the Pyrenees. He was promoted to captain in 1795, to lieutenant colonel in May 1797 and to colonel the following July. He became the commanding officer of the regiment in 1800 and saw action in the War of the Oranges.

In 1802 he was appointed military governor of Cervera. In 1804 he was appointed commanding officer of the Regiment of Granada and sent to garrison Mahón.

== Peninsular War ==
At the beginning of the war, his regiment was incorporated into the Army of Catalonia. He saw action at San Cugat on 12 October 1808 and, the following November, he was given command of the 3rd Division and promoted to brigadier.

The Army of Catalonia was routed at Molins de Rey (21 December 1808), and La Serna's troops were surrounded by the French army, although they managed to retreat in the direction of Corberá. Retreating further, they were attacked and sabred by French cavalry near Villafranca. Evacuated to Tarragona, La Serna died of his wounds the following day.

== Family ==
His son, Pedro Gómez de la Serna, born in Mahón, went on to become a noted Spanish jurist and politician, minister of the Interior of Baldomero Espartero's last cabinet, and with whom he went into exile to London, and became president of the Supreme Court in 1869.
