= Marquis del Palacio =

Spanish army officer and politician (1744–1816)

Domingo Mariano Traggia Uribarri, Marquis del Palacio
- Born: 20 November 1744; Zaragoza, Spain
- Died: 14 January 1816 (aged 71) Badajoz, Spain
- Branch: Cavalry
- Conflicts: Seven Years' War; Spanish invasion of Portugal (1762); Bragança; Villarreal, Siege of Almeida (1762); Siege of Castelo Branco; American Revolutionary War; Great Siege of Gibraltar; War of the Oranges; Peninsular War

Domingo Mariano Traggia Uribarri, Marquis del Palacio (1744–1816) was a Spanish military commander.

== Early career ==
Having enlisted in the España Volunteer Cavalry Regiment, he was promoted to alférez in March 1762 and saw active service in Portugal at Bragança, at the retreat from Villarreal, and at the Sieges of Almeida and Castelo Branco, among other actions.

He was promoted to captain in 1779 and given command of almost a hundred cadets at the Great Siege of Gibraltar, before being transferred to Ocaña. Appointed sargento mayor (second in command) he took charge of training a corps made up of twenty companies of Infantry Grenadiers together with twelve Cavalry regiments. In 1781 he was promoted to lieutenant colonel and, at the head of the troops he had trained, he returned to Gibraltar where he served under the Marquis of Avilés.

In 1789, he was stationed first in Aragón, and then later appointed military and political governor of Cervera del Río Alhama, Aguilar and surrounding hamlets to put down the popular uprisings there.

Promoted to colonel in 1791, in 1794 he was sent to Real Sitio de San Ildefonso, to attend to the Court, and from there, to the Ministry of War.

With the French army penetrating into Navarre, Aragón and Castile, he was tasked with raising and instructing all the civilian males aged 17–40 in his jurisdiction of Cervera del Río Alhama and other areas of the region, including Calahorra and Logroño.

In 1797, he ceased as governor and as a reward for his services, was promoted to brigadier and colonel of the Montesa Cavalry Regiment.

During the War of the Oranges (1801), he saw service as a colonel in the hussars and in May he was hit by a bullet and received a bayonet wound to the face.

In February 1808, he was promoted to field marshal.

== Peninsular War ==
On 30 June 1808, the Marquis, who had taken up the post of governor of Minorca earlier that month, joined the open mutiny of the Aragonese and Catalan battalions of his army demanding to be transferred to Barcelona to take up arms against the French, was finally able to sail from Port Mahon to mainland Spain.

His immediate superior, the Captain-General at Palma, General Vives, in charge of the corps of 10,000 men stationed in the Balearic Islands, garrisoned at Majorca and Minorca, had been reluctant to leave Port Mahon without troops due to his "deeply rooted idea" that the English would once again control Minorca, as they had done for the greater part of the 18th century. While the Aragonese regiment landed near Tortosa and marched for Saragossa, the bulk of the expeditionary force, nearly 5,000 strong, was put ashore in Catalonia between 19 and 23 July. The Marquis del Palacio was appointed captain general of Catalonia shortly thereafter.

In June 1811, he was appointed captain general of the Kingdom of Valencia and Murcia but was substituted by Blake shortly afterwards.

In October 1812, he was appointed captain general of Extremadura and in February 1813, Wellington named him general in chief of the 5th Army, under Captain-General Castaños.

== Post-war career ==
He was deputy for Aragon in the Cortes in 1813. He was also an academic, historian and writer. He is the author of many works on various subjects from military engineering to poetry.
