= Joseph Chabran =

French infantry commander

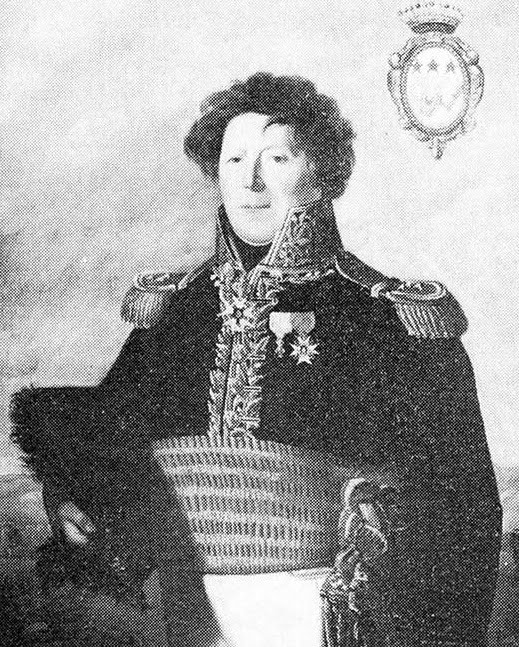
- General of Division Joseph Chabran
- Born: 21 June 1763; Cavaillon, France
- Died: February 1843 (aged 79); Avignon, France
- Military career
- Allegiance: (France) French First Republic, (France) First French Empire
- Branch: Infantry
- Service years: 1792–1814
- Rank: General of Division
- Conflicts: French Revolutionary Wars; Second Battle of Zurich; Peninsular War; Battle of Molins de Rei
- Awards: Légion d'honneur (Commander); Order of Saint Louis (Knight); Name inscribed under the Arc de Triomphe

Joseph Chabran (21 June 1763 in Cavaillon – February 1843 in Avignon), was a French military officer. He served as infantry commander during the French Revolutionary Wars and the Peninsular War. He commanded the French 8th Division during the Second Battle of Zurich, helping the French win the battle. Chabran travelled over the Pacific Ocean through the Spanish routes in the Mariana Islands and the Philippines before settling back in France.

== Offspring ==
It was rumoured that he had concubines and fathered children on his way back to France. The only documented child he claimed at the time was named Elena Chabran. Elena was one of his favourite children as she looked the most like the Commander. Elena was a teenager when she boarded the ship with Commander Chabran but fell in love and married a shipmate who died in the Marianas. Elena eventually married Don Juan Deleon Guerrero and stayed on the island of Saipan while her father and other siblings returned to France. Many of his children and their mothers never made it to France and were rumoured to have disembarked at other ports.
