= First Siege of Girona (Peninsular War) =

1808 battle during the Peninsular War

First siege of Girona
- Part of the Peninsular War
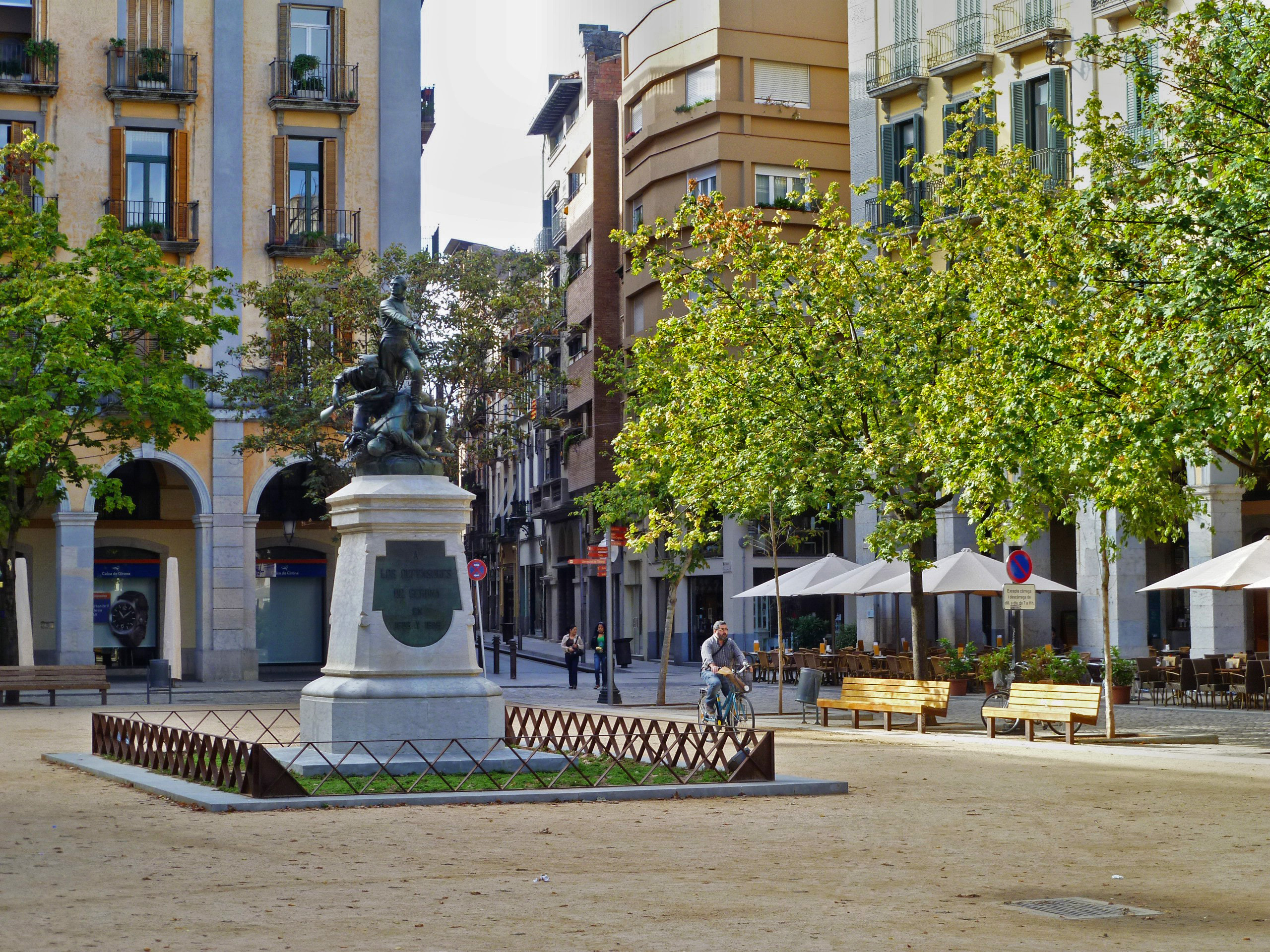
- Independence Square in Girona commemorates the struggle against the French from 1808 to 1814.
Date	20 and 21 June 1808
Location	Girona, Catalonia, Spain 41°58′N 2°49′E
Result	Spanish victory

Belligerents
(France) First French Empire (Kingdom of Italy (Napoleonic)) Kingdom of Italy; Kingdom of Naples	Kingdom of Spain

Commanders and leaders
(France) Guillaume Duhesme (France) Andrea Milossevich (France) François Schwarz	(Spain) Lt. Col. O'Donovan (Spain) Lt. Col. O'Daly

Strength
5,900, 8 guns	2,000

Casualties and losses
700	Light

Peninsular War: Spanish uprising 1808
current battle

The first siege of Girona during the Peninsular War, also called the battle of Gerona, took place from 20 to 21 June 1808, when an Imperial French division led by Guillaume Philibert Duhesme try to overrun a Spanish garrison commanded by Lieutenant Colonels O'Donovan and O'Daly. The French assault failed and the attackers withdrew.

As part of his plan to overthrow the Spanish ruling family, Emperor Napoleon ordered his soldiers to seize Barcelona in February 1808. The city's fortress was successfully occupied, but a few weeks later the Spanish people rebelled against Imperial French rule. Duhesme and his soldiers soon found themselves in difficulties. Hemmed in by Catalan militia and regular Spanish troops, the French general attempted to capture Girona in order to open up a secure supply line from France to Barcelona. The Franco-Italian force attempted to storm the city but they were repulsed by the city militia and two small battalions of Irish regular infantry in Spanish service. Duhesme fell back to Barcelona, but he returned to mount the second siege of Girona five weeks later.

== Background ==
The Spanish conventional warfare started with the Battles of El Bruch.

Months before, as part of his plan to seize his ally the Kingdom of Spain in a military coup, Emperor Napoleon ordered several key points, including Barcelona, to be captured in February 1808. On 29 February, General of Division Giuseppe Lechi's troops were moving through Barcelona. Lechi ordered a military review, and, as his soldiers marched past the main gate of the citadel, they suddenly veered left and rushed into the fortress. Without bloodshed, the Imperial troops hustled the stunned Spanish garrison out of the fortifications and occupied the place. Among other strong places, the French also seized San Sebastian, Pamplona and Figueras. In the Dos de Mayo Uprising in Madrid the Spanish people rose in revolt against the French occupiers.

By the summer of 1808, a 12,710-man French corps commanded by Guillaume Philibert Duhesme was based at Barcelona. General of Division Joseph Chabran led the 1st Division with 6,050 soldiers in eight battalions, while Lechi commanded the 2nd Division with 4,600 men in six battalions. The 1,700 cavalrymen in nine squadrons were under Generals of Brigade Bertrand Bessières and François Xavier de Schwarz. There were also 360 gunners.

This modest-sized force was tasked with putting down the insurrection in Catalonia, sending help to Marshal Bon-Adrien Jeannot de Moncey in his bid to capture Valencia, and keeping control of Barcelona. In view of the seriousness of the revolt, these orders were completely unrealistic. Duhesme attempted to comply with his instructions by sending Chabran and 3,000 troops to join Moncey and directing Schwarz with another column to seize Lerida. Schwarz left Barcelona on 4 June and immediately ran into trouble. In the first of the Battles of the Bruch swarms of Catalan miquelets (militia) kept his soldiers from crossing the pass. He called for help and Duhesme diverted Chabran to assist him. But the two generals were unable to force their way through the pass on 15 June. After suffering 400 casualties in the second battle, the French, Italians, and Swiss retreated. The Catalan irregulars tried to oppose Chabran's withdrawing force in the plains but were easily driven off. The frustrated French and their allies then brutally plundered every village along their route back to Barcelona.

== Battle ==
Alarmed at being isolated, Duhesme decided to clear his line of communications back to France. As he headed northeast toward Girona with a division-sized force, he encountered a large force of miquelets at Mataró. There were an estimated 10,000 Catalans with three or four cannons. On 17 June, the miquelets were easily defeated by the 5,963 Imperial soldiers and their eight artillery pieces. The Imperial troops celebrated their triumph by sacking Mataró for an entire day. As the Franco-Italian force continued on its way to Girona, the miquelets reoccupied the countryside and blocked all communication between Duhesme and Barcelona.

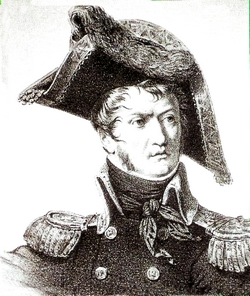
Guillaume Duhesme

In the expedition, Duhesme's force included General of Brigade Andrea Milossevich's 2,133-man brigade, Schwarz's 2,163-strong brigade, and 1,517 cavalry. Milossevich commanded the 2nd Battalions of the 2nd and 5th Italian Line Infantry Regiments and the 3rd Battalion of the 4th Italian Line Infantry. Schwarz directed the 1st and 2nd Battalions of the 1st Neapolitan Line Infantry Regiment and the 1st Battalion of the Italian Velites. There were 409 troopers in the 3rd Provisional Cuirassier Regiment, 416 sabers in the 3rd Provisional Chasseurs à Cheval Regiment, 504 cavalrymen in the Italian Chasseurs à Cheval, and 388 men in the Neapolitan Chasseurs à Cheval.

Girona was divided by the Onyar river into eastern and western portions. The smaller part of the city, called the Mercadal, was on the west bank. Since the Mercadal was unprotected by any natural defenses, the military engineers had provided it with five Vauban-type bastions. The larger, older east side of the city was defended by a line of forts along a ridge to the east and Montjuich citadel to the north. The city was ringed by a 20 feet (6 m) high wall dating to the Middle Ages.

The Franco-Italians arrived in front of Girona on 20 June. After his demand for surrender was declined, Duhesme decided to attack the city's defenses. Girona was defended by 350 regular soldiers in two battalions of the Ultonia Infantry Regiment. The unit was recruited from Irishmen and led by Lieutenant Colonels O'Donovan and O'Daly. Girona was also defended by 1,600 city militiamen and a handful of gunners, for a total of 2,000 defenders. Another source states that the city militia may have numbered as many as 2,000.

Duhesme directed his main attack at the Carmen gate on the east bank. The weakest part of the defenses, this gate was located on the south side. One battalion was sent against the Capuchins fort while other troops attacked two bastions on the west bank. The main attack started while Duhesme's aide-de-camp was still negotiating with the defenders. The French guns were quickly suppressed by Girona's artillery and the assault failed.

The French commander tried again that night, ordering Schwarz's brigade against the Santa Clara bastion on the west bank. The attack was a surprise and the Italians gained a foothold atop the walls. In the darkness, some of the scaling ladders went astray, so the attackers were unable to reinforce the successful party quickly enough. A savage counterattack by the Ultonia Regiment erased the Italians' lodgement. In the morning, Duhesme directed his third assault against one of the bastions. But this charge melted away in the face of intense fire from the alert defenders. Altogether, the Franco-Italians suffered 700 killed, wounded, and missing. Spanish losses were described as light.

== Result ==
Duhesme retreated to Barcelona, leaving Chabran and a brigade to hold Mataró. Soon after, Duhesme attacked a force of miquelets along the Llobregat River and drove them away. Chabran tried to entice the Catalan militia into battle but was unsuccessful. Finally becoming aware of Duhesme's troubles, Napoleon earmarked a newly formed division under General of Division Honoré Charles Reille to reinforce him. Reille moved out with an advanced guard and soon relieved the garrison of Sant Ferran Castle at Figueras. After assembling his whole division, Reille moved against the port of Roses, but was rebuffed by its defenders and the British battleship HMS Montagu, which landed its marines to help. Hearing about the division of reinforcements, Duhesme prepared for a new attempt on Girona. The next action was the Second siege of Girona.

== Aftermath ==
The Spanish conventional warfare proceeded with the Battle of Valencia.

== See also ==
- Timeline of the Peninsular War
- Second siege of Gerona (1808)
- Third siege of Gerona (1809)
