= Honoré Charles Reille =

French military officer (1775–1860)

Honoré Charles Michel Joseph Reille
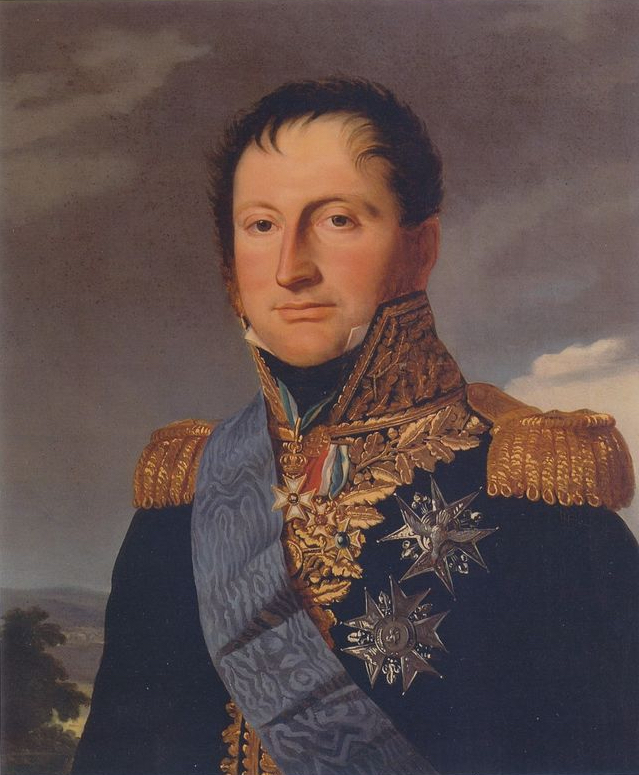
- Portrait of Reille
- Born: 1 September 1775; Antibes, France
- Died: 4 March 1860 (aged 84); Paris, France
- Burial place: Père Lachaise Cemetery, Paris
- Military career
- Allegiance: France
- Branch: French Army
- Service years: 1791–1815
- Rank: Général
- Conflicts: See list: French Revolutionary Wars; Napoleonic Wars; War of the Fourth Coalition; Battle of Jena; Battle of Pułtusk; Battle of Ostrołęka; Battle of Friedland; War of the Fifth Coalition; Battle of Aspern–Essling; Battle of Wagram; Walcheren Campaign; Peninsular War; Battle of Castellón; Battle of Vitoria; Battle of Roncesvalles; Hundred Days; Battle of Quatre Bras; Battle of Waterloo

Honoré Charles Michel Joseph Reille (French pronunciation: [ɔnɔʁe ʃaʁl miʃɛl ʒozɛf ʁɛj]; 1 September 1775 – 4 March 1860) was a Marshal of France, born in Antibes.

Reille served in the early campaigns of the French Revolutionary Wars under Dumouriez and Masséna, whose daughter Victoire he married. In 1800, Reille was appointed commander of the Italian city of Florence. Promoted to general de brigade in 1803, he commanded the allied troops of Württemberg during the War of the Third Coalition in 1805. He served in the battles of Jena, Pułtusk and Ostrolenka and served as aide-de-camp to Napoléon at Friedland.

In 1808, Reille partook in the campaign in Spain, the next year he participated in the battles of Aspern and Wagram. After Wagram, he was sent back to Spain, where until 1812 he commanded in Navarre and Aragon. By 1813 he was given command of the Army of Portugal which he commanded in the Battle of Vitoria but was defeated. Then he managed to win the Battle of Roncesvalles (1813).

After the fall of Napoléon in 1814, the Bourbons made Reille inspector-general of the 14th and 15th Infantry Divisions. During the Hundred Days, he rallied to Napoléon and was given command of II Corps, which he led in the battles of Quatre Bras and Waterloo.

In 1819, he was made a Peer, in 1847 he was made a Marshal of France and in 1852 he was made a Senator. Reille died in 1860 in Paris and was buried at Père Lachaise Cemetery, in the same tomb as his father-in-law Masséna. A street is named after him near the Parc Montsouris in the 14th arrondissement of Paris.

His son, René Reille (1835–1898), was a soldier, industrialist and politician who served for many years in the national Chamber of Deputies.

Marshal Reille's coat of arms
