= Tolstoy (disambiguation) =

Leo Tolstoy (1828–1910) was a Russian author.

Tolstoy or Tolstoi may also refer to:

- Tolstoy (surname)
  - Tolstoy family, a Russian noble family
- Tolstoi, Manitoba, Canada
- Tolstoy Cup, an annual student football match in England
- Tolstoy Farm, initiated and organised by Mahatma Gandhi in South Africa
- Tolstoi Formation, geologic formation in Alaska
- Tolstoy Foundation, United States
- Tolstoy House, a building in St. Petersburg, Russia
- Tolstoy, South Dakota, US
- Moscow Conference (1944), code name Tolstoy
- Vila Tolstói (São Paulo Metro), Brazil

== See also ==
- Tolstoj (disambiguation)
- Lev-Tolstovsky (disambiguation)
