= Johann von Klenau =

Austrian General of Cavalry in Napoleonic Wars

Graf Johann von Klenau
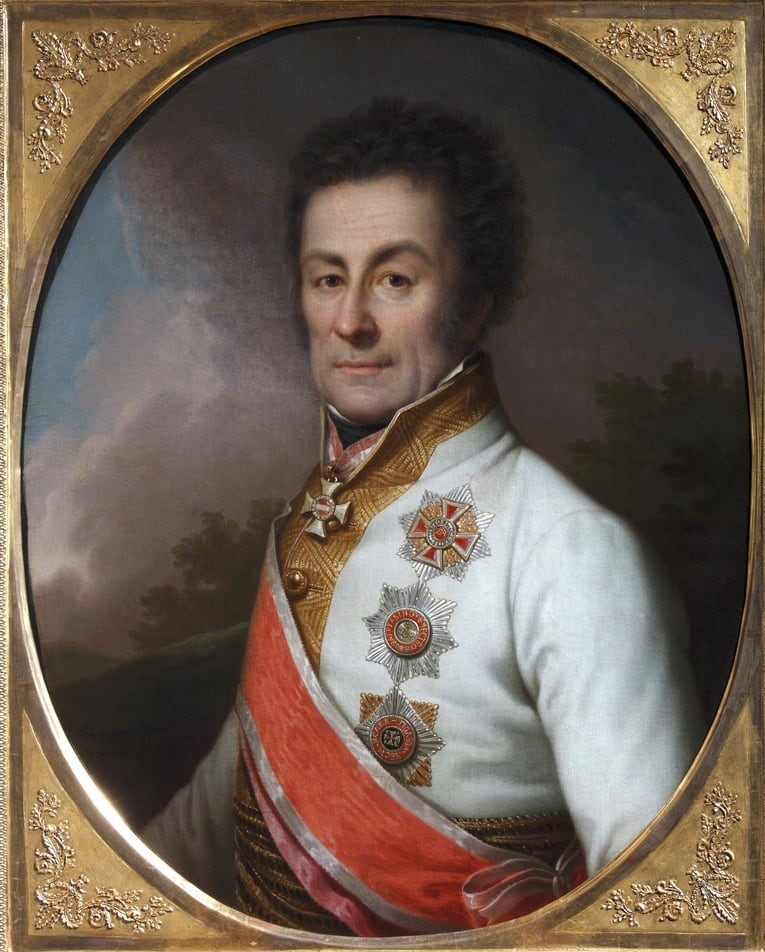
- 1814 portrait
- Born: 13 April 1758; Benátky nad Jizerou, Bohemia, Habsburg monarchy
- Died: 6 October 1819 (aged 61); Brno, Moravia, Austrian Empire
- Military career
- Allegiance: Habsburg monarchy
- Branch: Colonel-Proprietor – 5th Chevauxleger Regiment: 20 February 1804 – 10 June 1819
- Service years: 1775–1819
- Rank: General of Cavalry
- Conflicts: War of the Bavarian Succession; Austro-Turkish War (1788–1791); French Revolutionary Wars; Napoleonic Wars; First Battle of Wissembourg; Battle of Handschuhsheim; Battle of Lonato; Battle of Bassano; Siege of Ferrara; Ulm campaign; Battle of Aspern-Essling; Battle of Wagram; Battle of Dresden; Battle of Leipzig; Siege of Dresden (1813)
- Awards: • Knights Cross of the Military Order of Maria Theresa 30 October 1795 • Commanders Cross of the Military Order of Maria Theresa 13 July 1809 • Commander's Cross, Order of Leopold 7 January 1809 • Grand Cross, Order of Leopold 10 November 1813; Imperial Order of St. Alexander Nevsky (Russian) October 1813; Imperial Order of St. Vladimir 2nd Class (Russian), 1813

Johann Josef Cajetan Graf von Klenau, Freiherr von Janowitz (Czech: Jan hrabě z Klenové, svobodný pán z Janovic; 13 April 1758 – 6 October 1819) was a field marshal in the Habsburg army. Klenau, the son of a Bohemian noble, joined the Habsburg military as a teenager and fought in the War of Bavarian Succession against Prussia, Austria's wars with the Ottoman Empire, the French Revolutionary Wars, and the Napoleonic Wars, in which he commanded a corps in several important battles.

In the early years of the French Revolutionary Wars, Klenau distinguished himself at the Wissembourg lines, and led a battle-winning charge at Handschuhsheim in 1795. As commander of the Coalition's left flank in the Adige campaign in northern Italy in 1799, he was instrumental in isolating the French-held fortresses on the Po River by organizing and supporting a peasant uprising in the countryside. Afterward, Klenau became the youngest lieutenant field marshal in the history of the Habsburg military.

As a corps commander, Klenau led key elements of the Austrian army in its victory at Aspern-Essling and its defeat at Wagram, where his troops covered the retreat of the main Austrian force. He commanded the IV Corps at the 1813 Battle of Dresden and again at the Battle of Nations at Leipzig, where he prevented the French from outflanking the main Austrian force on the first day of the engagement. After the Battle of Nations, Klenau organized and implemented the successful Dresden blockade and negotiated the French capitulation there. In the 1814–15 campaign, he commanded the Corps Klenau of the Army of Italy. After the war in 1815, Klenau was appointed commanding general in Moravia and Silesia. He died in 1819.

== Family and early career ==
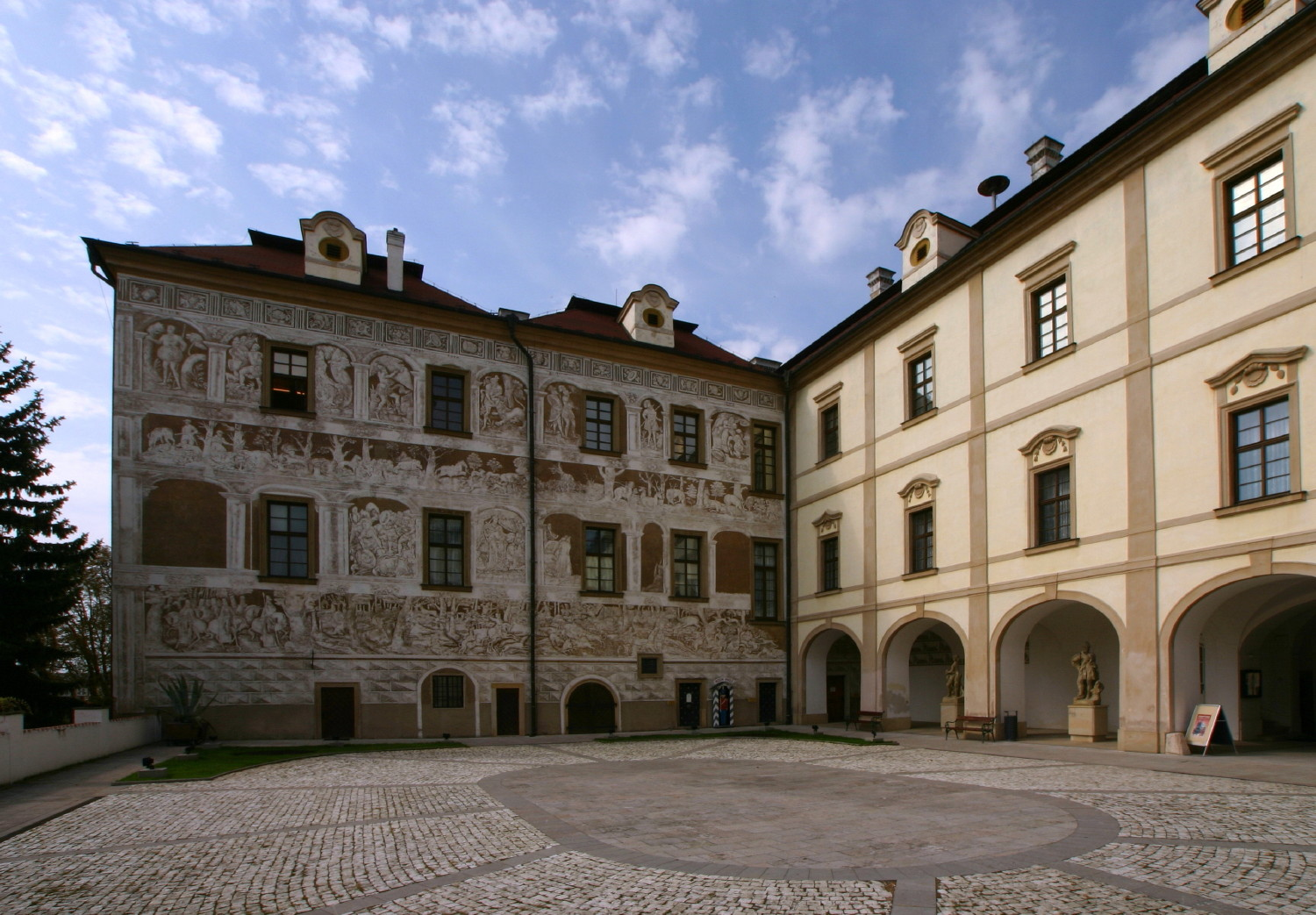
Benatek Castle, in Bohemia, where Klenau was born.

Johann Josef Cajetan von Klenau und Janowitz was born into an old Bohemian nobile family at Benatek Castle in the Habsburg province of Bohemia on 13 April 1758. The family of Klenau dates to the fifteenth century, and the family of Janowitz to the fourteenth. The family name of Klenau regularly appears in records after the sixteenth century. The Klenau family was one of the oldest dynasties in Bohemia, and many of the noble families of Bohemia have sprung from marriages into the Klenau line. The original name of the family was Przibik, with the predicate von Klenowa. The family was raised to the baronetcy in 1623 with the certificate granted to one Johann von Klenowa and, in 1629, to his son, Wilhelm. The Imperial councilor and judge in Regensburg, Wilhelm von Klenau, was raised to comital status in 1630, and to the status of Reichsgraf, or imperial count, in 1633.

Johann Klenau entered the 47th Infantry Regiment Ellrichshausen in 1774, at the age of 17, and became a second lieutenant in 1775. After transferring to a Chevauleger regiment as a Rittmeister, or captain of cavalry, Klenau fought in the short War of the Bavarian Succession, also known as the Potato War. Most of this conflict occurred in Bohemia (part of the modern Czech Republic) from 1778 to 1779, between the Habsburg monarchy, Saxony, Bavaria and Prussia. The war had no battles, but was instead a series of skirmishes and raids, making it the ideal situation for a captain of light cavalry. In their raids, forces from both sides sought to confiscate or destroy the other's provisions, fodder, and materiel.

In the Austro–Turkish War (1787–1791), one of the House of Habsburg's many 18th-century wars with the Ottoman Empire, Klenau served in the 26th Dragoon Regiment Toscana, and later transferred to the 1st Dragoon Regiment Kaiser. His regiment repulsed an attack of superior numbers of Ottoman forces on 28 September 1788, at Zemun, near Belgrade, for which he received a personal commendation and earned his promotion to major. In his early military career Klenau demonstrated, not only at Zemun but also in the earlier skirmishing and raids of 1778 and 1779, the attributes required of a successful cavalry officer: the military acumen to evaluate a situation, the flexibility to adjust his plans on a moment's notice, and the personal courage to take the same risks he demanded of his men.

== French Revolutionary Wars ==
=== Background ===
Initially, the rulers of Europe considered the 1789 revolution in France as an affair between the French king and his subjects, and not a matter in which they should interfere. However, as the rhetoric grew more strident after 1790, the European monarchs began to view the French upheavals with alarm. Among the concerned monarchs were the Holy Roman emperor Leopold II, who feared for the life and well-being of his sister, the queen of France, Marie Antoinette. In August 1791, in consultation with French émigré nobles and Frederick William II of Prussia, he issued the Declaration of Pillnitz, in which they declared the interest of the monarchs of Europe as one with the interests of Louis XVI and his family. They threatened ambiguous, but quite serious, consequences if anything should happen to the royal family.

The French Republican position became increasingly difficult. Compounding problems in international relations, French émigrés agitated for support of a counter-revolution. From their base in Koblenz, adjacent to the French–German border, they sought direct support for military intervention from the royal houses of Europe, and raised an army. On 20 April 1792, the French National Convention declared war on Austria and its allies. In this War of the First Coalition (1792–1798), France ranged itself against most of the European states sharing land or water borders with her. Portugal and the Ottoman Empire also joined the alliance against France.

=== Klenau and the War of the First Coalition ===
On 12 February 1793, Klenau received his promotion to lieutenant colonel in a Lancer regiment, and joined the Austrian force in the Rhineland, serving under General of Cavalry Count Dagobert Sigmund von Wurmser. He was captured later in the spring near the town of Offenbach, but was freed unexpectedly by two Austrian Hussars from the 17th Regiment Archduke Alexander Leopold, who came upon him and his captors. At the first Battle of Wissembourg, Klenau commanded a brigade in Friedrich, Baron von Hotze's 3rd Column on 13 October 1793, during which the Habsburg force stormed the 19 kilometers (12 mi) earthen ramparts held by the French.

By the terms of the Peace of Basel (22 July 1795), the Prussian army was to leave the Rhine and Main river valleys; as it did so, the French quickly overran these territories. On 20 September, the fortress at Mannheim surrendered to the French without firing a shot. Mannheim had been garrisoned by a Bavarian commander, Lieutenant General Baron von Belderbusch, and several battalions of Bavarian grenadiers, fusiliers, and guard regiments, plus six companies of artillery. A small Austrian force augmented the Bavarian contingent. At the same time, further north, the fortified town of Düsseldorf, also garrisoned by Bavarians, capitulated to the French. With these capitulations, the French controlled the Rhine crossings at Düsseldorf and at the junction of the Rhine and the Main rivers. To maintain contact with the forces on their flanks, the Austrian commanders, outraged at this fait accompli, had to withdraw across the Main river.

The nearby city of Heidelberg, further south of the Main on the Neckar River, appeared to be the next French target. Lieutenant Field Marshal Peter Quasdanovich, who had remained in the region between Mannheim and Heidelberg, used a hastily enhanced abatis to establish a defensive line at the sleepy country village of Handschuhsheim, east of the city of Heidelberg. The French force of two divisions—about 12,000 men—outnumbered the 8,000 defenders, and the position seemed untenable.

==== Klenau's charge ====
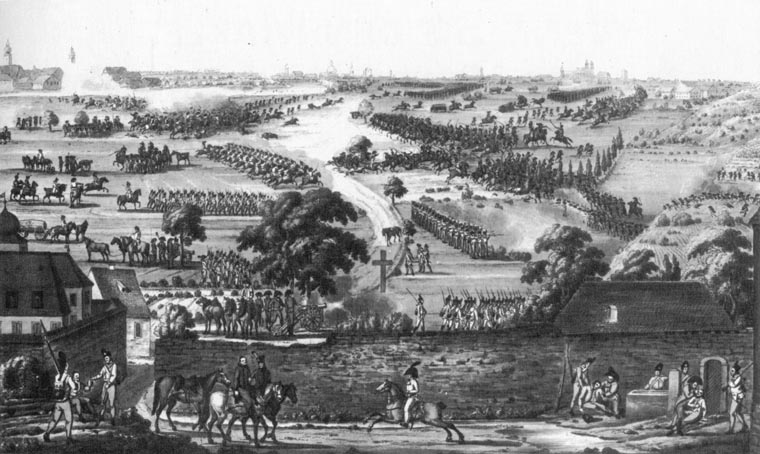
Klenau's charge at Handschuhsheim won the day.

At Handschuhsheim, Klenau commanded a mounted brigade that included the six squadrons of the 4th Cuirassiers Regiment Hohenzollern, two squadrons of the 3rd Dragoon Regiment Kaiser, six squadrons of the 44th Hussar regiment Szeckler, and four squadrons of the French émigré regiment Allemand. On 24 September 1795, seeing the French, with five battalions and a regiment of Chasseurs overwhelming the troops of General Adam Bajalics von Bajahaza, Klenau quickly organized his own brigade into three columns and attacked. In a battle-winning charge, Klenau's brigade (approximately 4,000 men) dispersed the French divisions of Charles Pichegru's Army of the Upper Rhine, under the command of General of Division Georges Joseph Dufour. His cavalry caught Dufour's entire division in the open, dispersed Dufour's six squadrons of Chasseurs, and cut down Dufour's infantry. With a loss of 193 men and 54 horses, the Austrians inflicted over 1,500 French casualties, including 1,000 killed; they also captured eight guns, nine ammunition caissons and their teams, and General Dufour himself. In the action, General of Brigade Dusirat was wounded, as was Dufour before his capture. Additional Austrian losses included 35 men and 58 horses killed, six officers, 144 men and 78 horses wounded, and two men and three horses missing. For his role in this exploit, Klenau was promoted to colonel and awarded the Knight's Cross of the Military Order of Maria Theresa. At Handschuhsheim, as he had earlier at Zemon, Klenau demonstrated his "higher military calling," establishing himself as an intrepid, tenacious, and quick-thinking field officer.

=== Action in the Italian theater ===
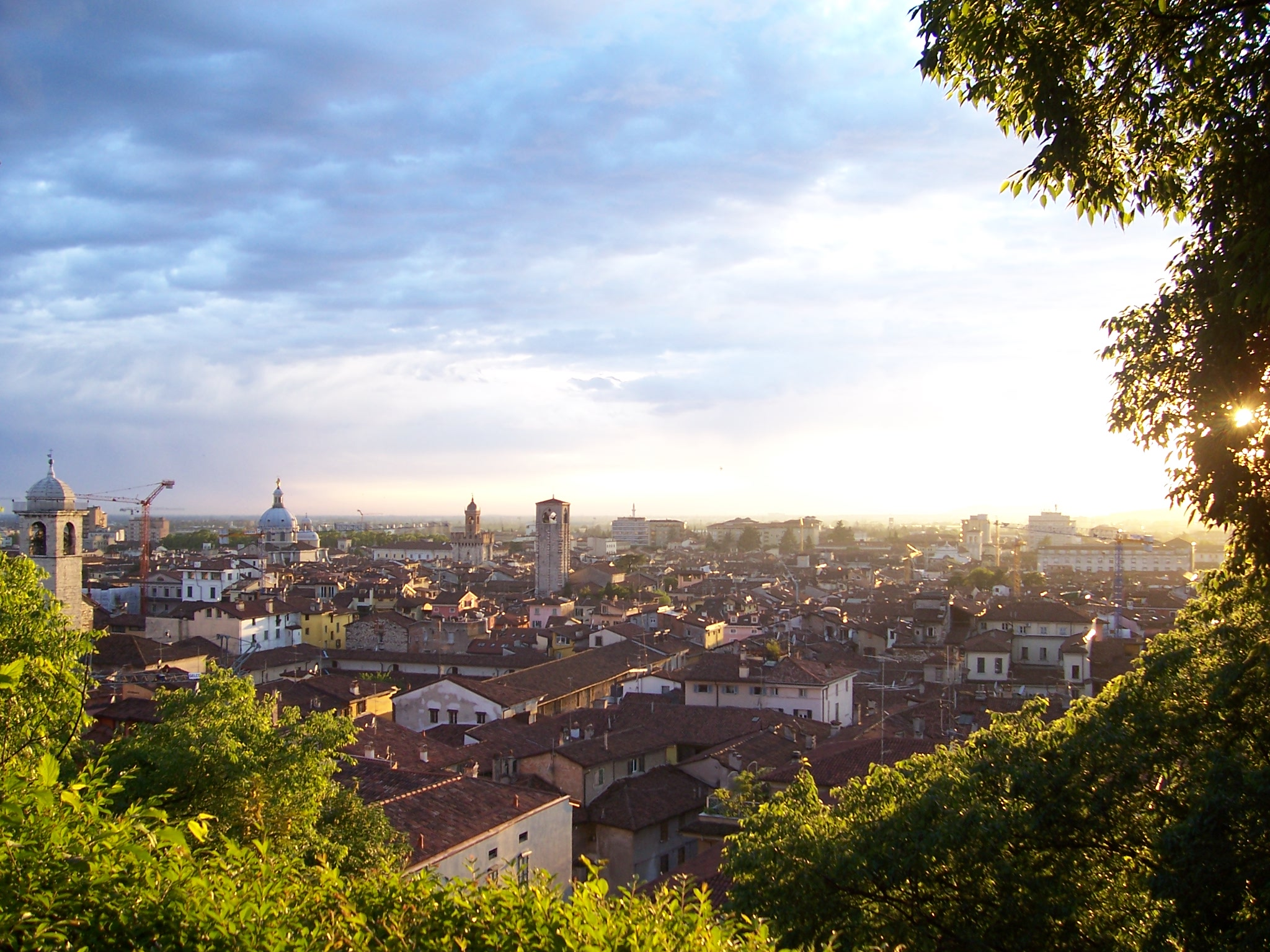
Klenau approached the town of Brescia at night, surprising the garrison, and taking as his prisoners three officials of the French Directory.

In 1796, Klenau commanded the advance guard of Peter Quasdanovich's right column in northern Italy. As the column descended from the Alps at the city of Brescia, reconnaissance found the local French garrison unprepared. At midnight, Klenau led two squadrons of the 8th Hussar Regiment Wurmser (named for its Colonel-Proprietor Dagobert von Wurmser), a battalion of the 37th Infantry Regiment De Vins, and one company of the Mahony Jäger. With their approach masked by fog and darkness, the small force surprised the Brescia garrison on the morning of 30 July, capturing not only the 600–700 French soldiers stationed there, but also three officials of the French Directory: Jean Lannes, Joachim Murat, and François Étienne de Kellermann. However, within two days, Klenau's force had to face Napoleon Bonaparte and 12,000 Frenchmen; his small advance guard was quickly pushed out of Brescia on 1 August. At the subsequent Battle of Lonato of 2–3 August 1796, the French forced Quasdanovich's column to withdraw into the mountains. This isolated Quasdanovich's force from Wurmser's main army by Lake Garda, and freed the French to concentrate on the main force at Castiglione delle Stiviere, further south; Bonaparte's victory at the Battle of Castiglione forced Wurmser across the Mincio River, and allowed the French to return to the siege of Mantua.

By early September, Klenau's force had rejoined Wurmser's column and fought at the Battle of Bassano on 8 September. Here, the Austrians were outnumbered almost two to one by the French. As the Austrian army retreated, Bonaparte ordered a pursuit that caused the Austrians to abandon their artillery and baggage. Most of the third battalion of the 59th Jordis, and the first battalion of the Border Infantry Banat were captured and these units ceased to exist after this battle. The Austrians lost 600 killed and wounded, and 2,000 captured, plus lost 30 guns, eight colors, and 200 limbers and ammunition waggons. Klenau was with Wurmser's column again as it fought its way to besieged Mantua and he participated in the combat at La Favorita near there on 15 September. This was the second attempt to relieve the fortress; as the Austrians withdrew from the battle, they retreated into Mantua itself, and from 15 September until 2 February 1797, Klenau was trapped in the fortress while the city was besieged. Following the Austrian loss at the Battle of Rivoli, 48 kilometers (30 mi) north of Mantua, on 14–15 January 1797, when clearly there would be no Austrian relief for Mantua, Klenau negotiated conditions of surrender with French General Jean Sérurier, although additional evidence suggests that Bonaparte was present and dictated far more generous terms than Klenau expected. When the garrison capitulated in February, Klenau co-signed the document with Wurmser.

=== Peace and the Congress of Rastatt ===
Although the Coalition forces—Austria, Russia, Prussia, Great Britain, Sardinia, among others—had achieved several victories at Verdun, Kaiserslautern, Neerwinden, Mainz, Amberg and Würzburg, in Italy the Coalition's achievements were more limited. In northern Italy, despite the presence of the most experienced of the Austrian generals—Dagobert Wurmser—the Austrians could not lift the siege at Mantua, and the efforts of Napoleon in northern Italy pushed Austrian forces to the border of Habsburg lands. Napoleon dictated a cease-fire at Leoben on 17 April 1797, which led to the formal peace treaty, the Treaty of Campo Formio, which went into effect on 17 October 1797.

The treaty called for meetings between the involved parties to work out the exact territorial and remunerative details. These were to be convened at a small town in the upper Rhine valley, Rastatt, close to the French border. The primary combatants of the First Coalition, France and Austria, were highly suspicious of each other's motives, and the Congress quickly derailed in a mire of intrigue and diplomatic posturing. The French demanded more territory than originally agreed. The Austrians were reluctant to cede the designated territories. The Rastatt delegates could not, or would not, orchestrate the transfer of agreed-upon territories to compensate the German princes for their losses. Compounding the Congress's problems, tensions grew between France and most of the First Coalition allies, either separately or jointly. Ferdinand of Naples refused to pay agreed-upon tribute to France, and his subjects followed this refusal with a rebellion. The French invaded Naples and established the Parthenopean Republic. A republican uprising in the Swiss cantons, encouraged by the French Republic which offered military support, led to the overthrow of the Swiss Confederation and the establishment of the Helvetic Republic.

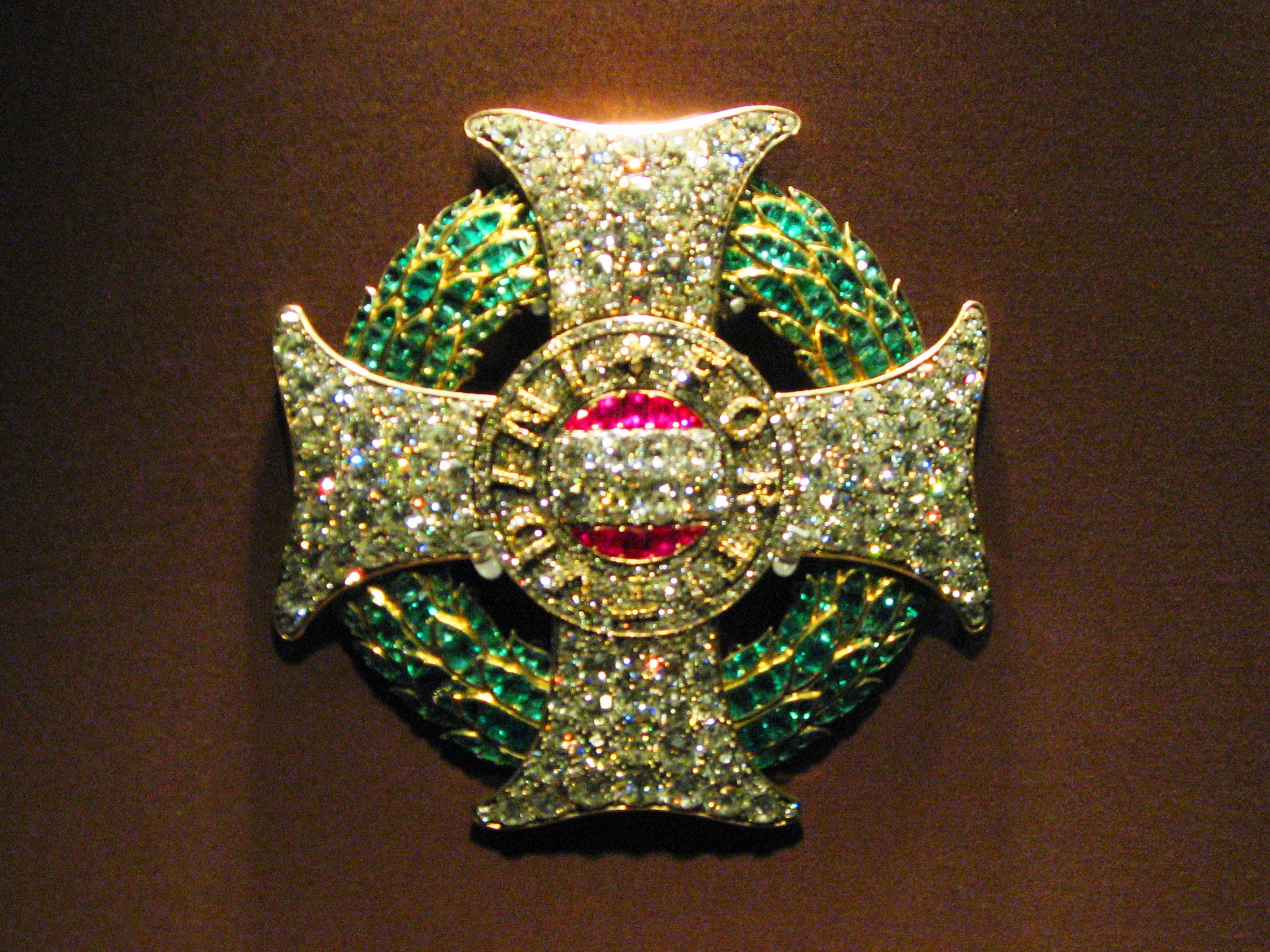
This gem-studded 1765 exemplar of the Commanders' Cross is engraved with the word FORTITUDE.

Other factors contributed to the rising tensions. On his way to Egypt in 1798, Napoleon had stopped on the Island of Malta and forcibly removed the Hospitallers from their possessions. This angered Paul, Tsar of Russia, who was the honorary head of the Order. The French Directory was convinced that the Austrians were conniving to start another war. Indeed, the weaker the French Republic seemed, the more seriously the Austrians, the Neapolitans, the Russians, and the English actually discussed this possibility.

=== Outbreak of war in 1799 ===
Archduke Charles of Austria, arguably among the best commanders of the House of Habsburg in the late 18th and early 19th centuries, had taken command of the Austrian army in late January. Although Charles was unhappy with the strategy set by his brother, the Holy Roman emperor Francis II, he had acquiesced to the less ambitious plan to which Francis and his advisers, the Aulic Council, had agreed: Austria would fight a defensive war and would maintain a continuous defensive line from the southern bank of the Danube, across the Swiss Cantons and into northern Italy. The archduke had stationed himself at Friedberg for the winter, 4.7 kilometers (3 mi) east-south-east of Augsburg. His army settled into cantonments in the environs of Augsburg, extending south along the Lech river.

As winter broke in 1799, on 1 March, General Jean-Baptiste Jourdan and his army of 25,000, the Army of the Danube, crossed the Rhine at Kehl. Instructed to block the Austrians from access to the Swiss alpine passes, Jourdan planned to isolate the armies of the Coalition in Germany from allies in northern Italy, and prevent them from assisting one another. By crossing the Rhine in early March, Jourdan acted before Charles' army could be reinforced by Austria's Russian allies, who had agreed to send 60,000 seasoned soldiers and their more-seasoned commander, Generalissimo Alexander Suvorov. Furthermore, if the French held the interior passes in Switzerland, they could prevent the Austrians from transferring troops between northern Italy and southwestern Germany, and use the routes to move their own forces between the two theaters.

The Army of the Danube advanced through the Black Forest and eventually established a line from Lake Constance to the south bank of the Danube, centered at the Imperial City of Pfullendorf in Upper Swabia. At the same time, the Army of Switzerland, under command of André Masséna, pushed toward the Grisons, intending to cut the Austrian lines of communication and relief at the mountain passes by Luziensteig and Feldkirch. The Army of Italy, commanded by Louis Joseph Schérer, had already advanced into northern Italy, to deal with Ferdinand and the recalcitrant Neapolitans.

=== Campaigns of 1799–1800 ===
At the onset of the 1799 campaign in Italy, Klenau and his 4,500 troops incited and then assisted an uprising of 4,000 or more peasants in the Italian countryside, adjacent to the Po River, and the subsequent general insurgency pinned down the French on the river's east bank. Klenau's troops, especially some of his Italian-speaking officers, incited peasants against French authority, provided arms and suggested military targets of opportunity, and incorporated the Austrian-armed peasants into their military actions.

==== Klenau's siege of Ferrara ====
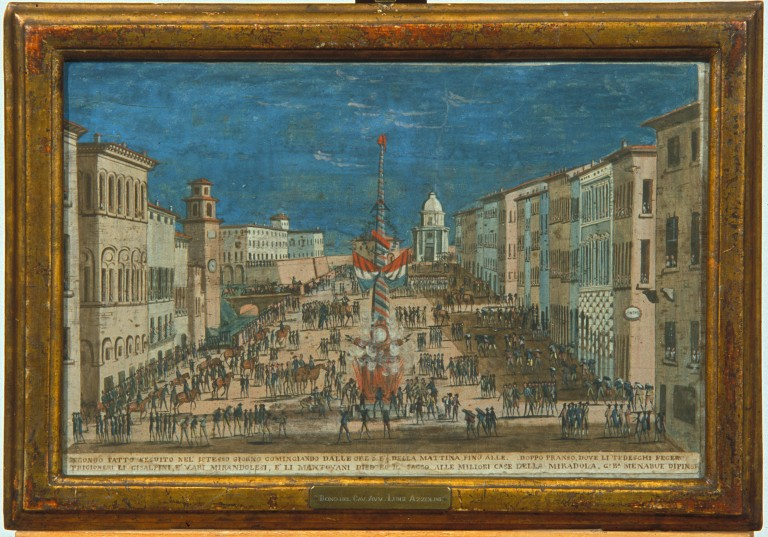
Conflict in the square of Mirandola on 15 April 1799

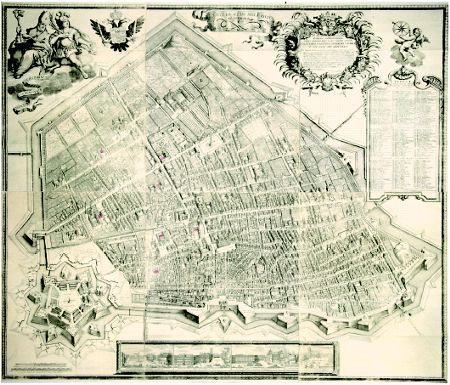
The French commander took refuge in the fortress at Ferrara, from which it was difficult to dislodge him. Klenau captured the city first, then the fortress three days later.

The Ferrara fortress had been constructed in the 16th century by Pope Paul V, built in the style of the Trace italienne, or a star, and it straddled the southwest corner of the town's fortifications. The fortress offered whoever possessed it a strategic point in the region: it was the lynch-pin of the French defense. In spring 1799, it was commanded by Chef-de-brigade Lapointe with a garrison of close to 2,500. On 15 April, Klenau approached the fortress and requested its capitulation. The commander refused. Klenau blockaded the city, leaving a small group of artillery and troops to continue the siege. For the next three days, Klenau patrolled the countryside, capturing the surrounding strategic points of Lagoscuro, Borgoforte and the Mirandola fortress. The besieged garrison made several sorties from the Saint Paul's Gate, which were repulsed by the insurgent peasants. The French attempted two rescues of the beleaguered fortress: In the first, on 24 April, a force of 400 Modenese was repulsed at Mirandola. In the second, General Montrichard tried to raise the city blockade by advancing with a force of 4,000. Finally, at the end of the month, a column of Pierre-Augustin Hulin reached and resupplied the fortress.

Klenau took possession of the town on 21 May, and garrisoned it with a light battalion. The Jewish residents of Ferrara paid 30,000 ducats to prevent the pillage of the city by Klenau's forces; this was used to pay the wages of Gardani's troops. Although Klenau held the town, the French still possessed the town's fortress. After making the standard request for surrender at 08:00, which was refused, Klenau ordered a barrage from his mortars and howitzers. After two magazines caught fire, the commandant was summoned again to surrender; there was some delay, but a flag of truce was sent at 21:00, and the capitulation was concluded at 01:00 the next day. Upon taking possession of the fortress, Klenau found 75 new artillery pieces, plus ammunition and six months' worth of provisions. The peasant uprisings pinned down the French and, by capturing Ferrara, Klenau helped to isolate the other French-held fortresses from patrols, reconnaissance, and relief and supply forces. This made the fortresses and their garrisons vulnerable to Suvorov's main force, operating in the Po River valley. In the course of the summer, Suvorov's forces took a key position on the Tidone River on 17 June 1799, west of Piacenza, another at the junction of the Trebbia River and the Po, in northern Italy, on 17–20 June 1799, and the town of Novi Ligure on 15 August 1799, 22 kilometers (14 mi) southeast of Alessandria on the Tanaro river.

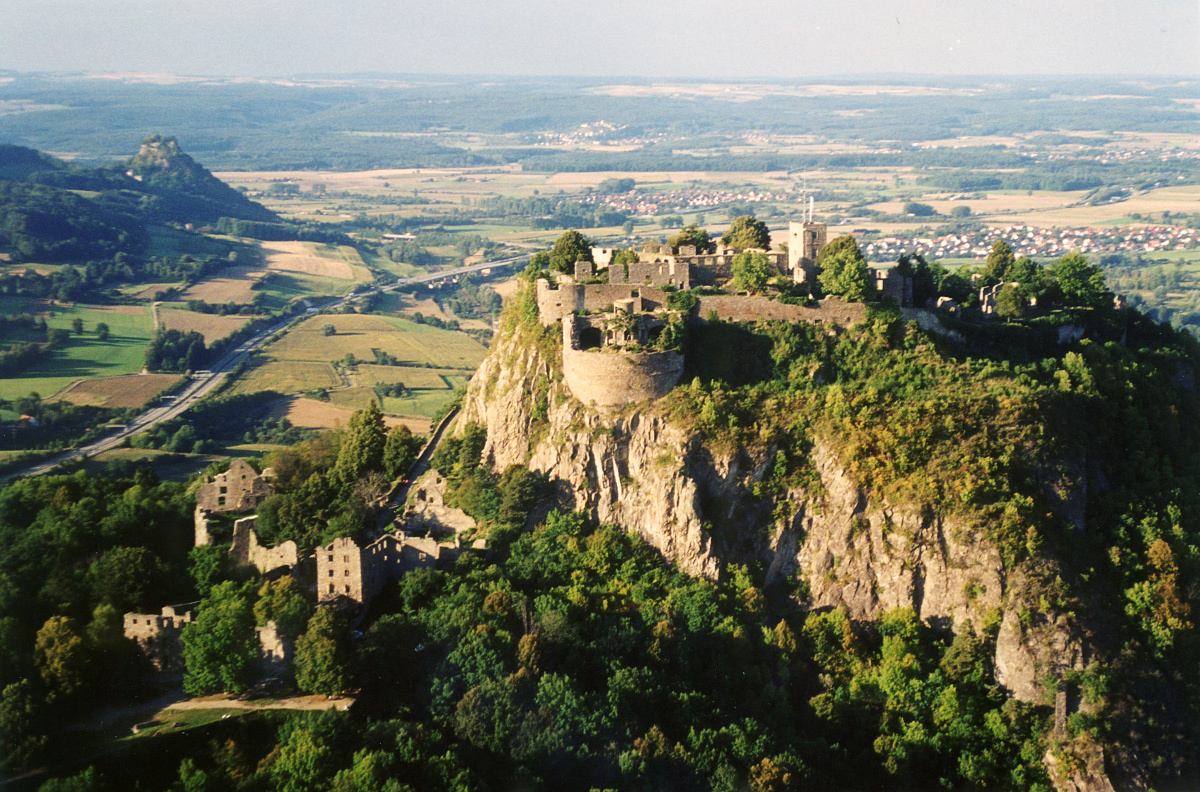
The Battles of Stockach and Engen in May 1800, followed by a larger battle at Messkirch. The fortress at Hohentwiel later capitulated to the French. Photo courtesy of Peter Stein.

==== 1800 campaign in Swabia ====
In early 1800, Klenau transferred to the K(aiserlich) und K(oeniglich) (Imperial and Royal) army of Germany, in Swabia, under the command of Feldzeugmeister Paul, Baron von Kray. The 1800 campaign in southwest Germany began on 1 May 1800, at the village of Büsingen, 4 kilometers (2 mi) east of Schaffhausen (Switzerland); there a small force of 6,000 men under command of General of Brigade François Goullus defeated 4,000 men, three battalions of the 7th Infantry Regiment Schröder, commanded by Lieutenant Field Marshal Karl Eugen, Prince von Lothringen-Lambesc. Following this clash, the impenetrable Württemberg fortress, Hohentwiel, capitulated to the French, in what the Duke of Württemberg considered a scandalous lack of military courage.

The widowed Josephina (née de Viseck) Somsich de Sard married Klenau in 1800.

After these encounters, the French army moved toward Stockach, less than 10 kilometers (6 mi) northwest of Hohentwiel, where they engaged the Austrian force, under Kray, in the battles of Engen and Stockach and Messkirch against the troops of the French Army of the Rhine, under Jean Victor Moreau. Stockach, at the western tip of Lake Constance, covered east–west and north–south crossroads; it and near-by Engen, only 20 kilometers (12 mi) west, had been the site of a French loss 14 months earlier. In 1800, a different general, Moreau, brought 84,000 troops against Kray's 72,000 men; this concentration of French force pushed the Austrian army eastward. Two days later, at Messkirch 23 kilometers (14 mi) northeast of Stockach, Moreau brought 52,000 men, including Claude Lecourbe's and Dominique Vandamme's divisions, which had experienced the disappointing French loss in 1799, and Étienne Marie Antoine Champion de Nansouty's experienced cavalry against Kray's force of 48,000. Although the French lost more men, once again they drove the Austrians from the field.

Despite the Imperial losses at these battles, Klenau's solid field leadership led to his promotion to lieutenant field marshal. That year he also married the widowed Maria Josephina Somsich de Sard, daughter of Tallian de Viseck. They had one daughter, Maria, born at the end of the year. From 1801 to 1805, during which Austria remained aloof from the ongoing friction between Britain and Napoleon's France, Klenau commanded a division in Prague, and was named as colonel and Inhaber of the 5th Dragoon Regiment.

== Napoleonic Wars ==
=== Background ===
In a series of conflicts from 1803 to 1815, known as the Napoleonic Wars, the alliances of the powers of Europe formed five coalitions against the First French Empire of Napoleon. Like the wars sparked by the French Revolution of 1789, these wars revolutionized the construction, organization, and training of European armies and led to an unprecedented militarization, mainly due to mass conscription. French power rose quickly, conquering most of Europe, but collapsed rapidly after France's disastrous invasion of Russia in 1812. Napoleon's empire ultimately suffered complete military defeat in the 1813–1814 campaigns, resulting in the restoration of the Bourbon monarchy in France. Although Napoleon made a spectacular return in 1815, known as the Hundred Days, his defeat at the Battle of Waterloo, the pursuit of his army and himself, his abdication, and his banishment to the Island of Saint Helena, concluded the Napoleonic wars.

=== War of the Third Coalition ===
In the War of the Third Coalition, 1803–1806, an alliance of Austria, Portugal, Russia, and others fought the First French Empire and its client states. Although several naval battles determined control of the seas, the outcome of the war was determined on the continent, predominantly in two major land operations. In the Ulm campaign, Klenau's force achieved the single Austrian victory prior to the surrender of the Austrian army in Swabia. In the second determining event, the decisive French victory at the Battle of Austerlitz over the combined Russian and Austrian force forced a final capitulation of the Austrian forces and took the Habsburgs out of the Coalition. This did not establish a lasting peace on the continent. Prussian worries about growing French influence in Central Europe sparked the War of the Fourth Coalition in 1806, in which Austria did not participate.

==== Danube campaign: Road to Ulm ====
Upon Austria's entrance into the war in summer 1805, Klenau joined the Habsburg army in southern Germany and became mired in a short campaign that exposed the worst of the Habsburg military organization. Archduke Charles was sick, and had retired to recuperate. Archduke Ferdinand, the brother-in-law of the emperor Francis, was theoretically in command, but Ferdinand was a poor choice of replacement, having neither experience, maturity, nor aptitude. Although Ferdinand retained nominal command, decisions were placed in the hands of Karl Mack, who was timid, indecisive, and ill-suited for such an important assignment. Furthermore, Mack had been wounded earlier in the campaign, and was unable to take full charge of the army. Consequently, command further devolved to Lieutenant Field Marshal Karl Philipp, Prince of Schwarzenberg, an able military officer, but as yet inexperienced in the command of such a large army.

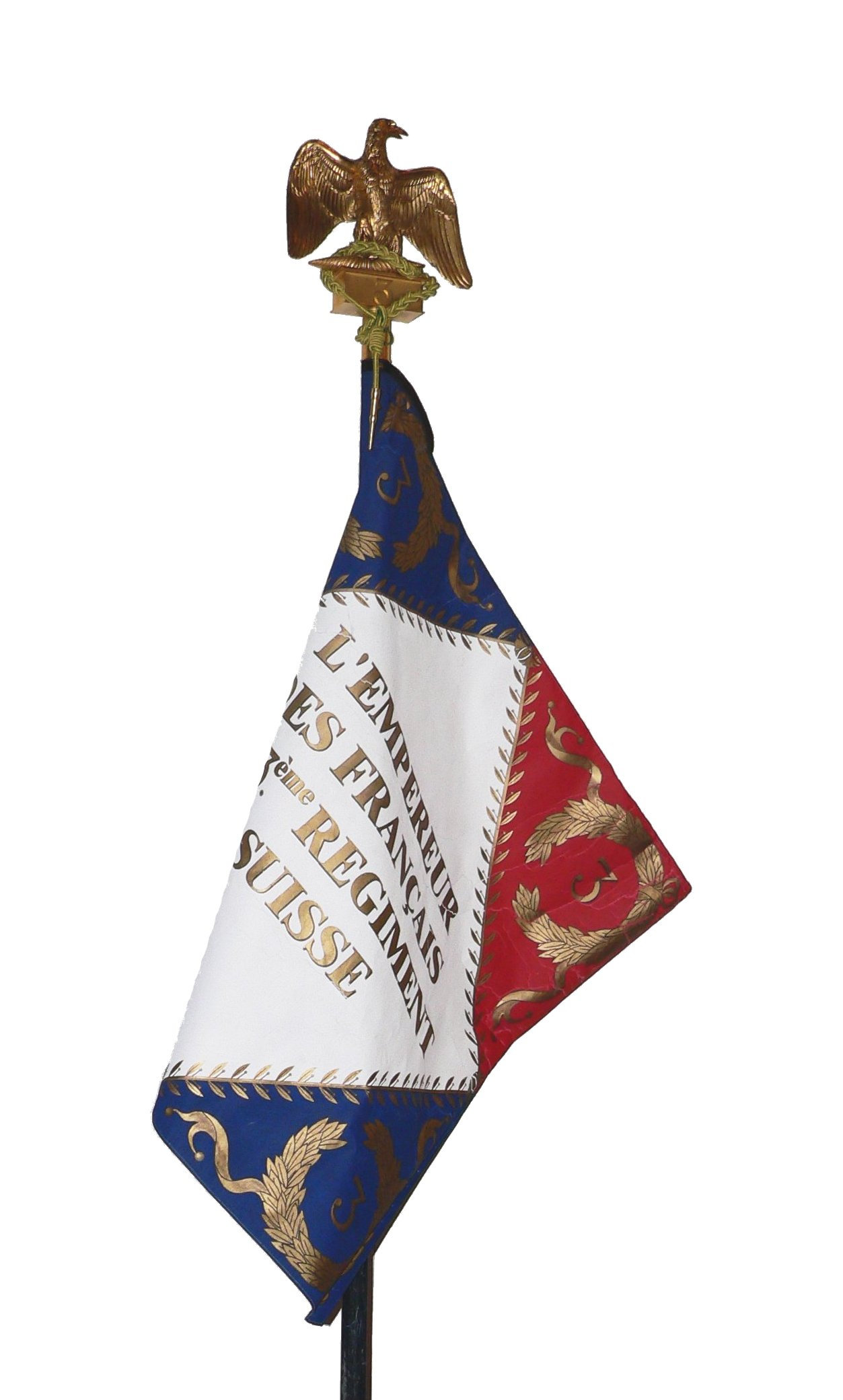
The capture of a unit's guidon, or standard, and the Imperial eagle, was an honor to the unit that captured it and a disgrace to the unit that lost it.

The campaign began in October, with several clashes in Swabia. At the first, near the Bavarian town of Wertingen, 40 kilometers (25 mi) northwest of Augsburg, on 8 October, Murat's Cavalry Corps and grenadiers of Lannes' V Corps surprised an Austrian force half their size. The Austrians had assembled in line, and the cavalry and grenadiers cut them down before the Austrians could form their defensive squares. Nearly 3,000 were captured. A day later, at Günzburg immediately south of the Danube, the French again met an Austrian force; General Mack could not decide on a plan, and the French 59th Regiment of the Line stormed a bridge over the Danube, and, in a humiliating episode, chased two large Austrian columns toward Ulm. In this action, the French secured an important bridgehead on the Danube River.

With the string of French victories, Lieutenant Field Marshal Klenau provided the only ray of hope in a campaign fraught with losses. At Ulm-Jungingen, Klenau had arranged his 25,000 infantry and cavalry in a prime defensive position and, on 11 October, an over-confident General of Division Dupon de l'Étang attacked Klenau's force with fewer than 8,000 men. The French lost 1,500 dead and wounded, 900 captured, 11 guns and 18 ammunition wagons captured, but possibly of greater significance, the Imperial Eagles and guidons of the 15th and 17th Dragoons were taken by the Austrians.

Despite Klenau's success at the Battle of Haslach-Jungingen, the Austrians could not sustain their positions around him, and the entire line retreated toward Ulm. Napoleon's lightning campaign exposed the Austrian weaknesses, particularly of indecisive command structure and poor supply apparatus. The Austrians were low on ammunition and outgunned. The components of the army, division by division, were being separated from one another. Morale sank, "sapped by Mack's chaotic orders and their [the troops] growing lack of confidence in their nominal commander," Ferdinand. Following the Austrian capitulation at Memmingen, 55 kilometers (34 mi) south of Ulm, the French achieved a morale boost over the Austrians at the Battle of Elchingen, outside of Biberach, on 14 October. Here, 12 kilometers (7 mi) northeast of Ulm, and slightly north of the Danube, Ney's VI Corps (20,000 men) captured half of the Austrian Reserve Artillery park at Thalfingen. In a further blow, Field Marshal Riesch was unable to destroy the Danube bridges, which Ney secured for the French. Ney received the victory title, Duke of Elchingen.

At this point, the entire Austrian force, including Klenau's column, withdrew into Ulm and its environs and Napoleon himself arrived to take command of the II, V, VI Corps, Ney's Cavalry and the Imperial Guard, numbering close to 80,000 men. Archduke Ferdinand and a dozen cavalry squadrons broke out through the French army and escaped into Bohemia. Again, as he had been at Mantua, Klenau was caught in a siege from which there was no escape, and again, he helped to negotiate the terms, when, on 21 October, Karl Mack surrendered the encircled army of 20,000 infantry and 3,273 cavalry. Klenau and the other officers were released on the condition that they not serve against France until exchanged, an agreement to which they held.

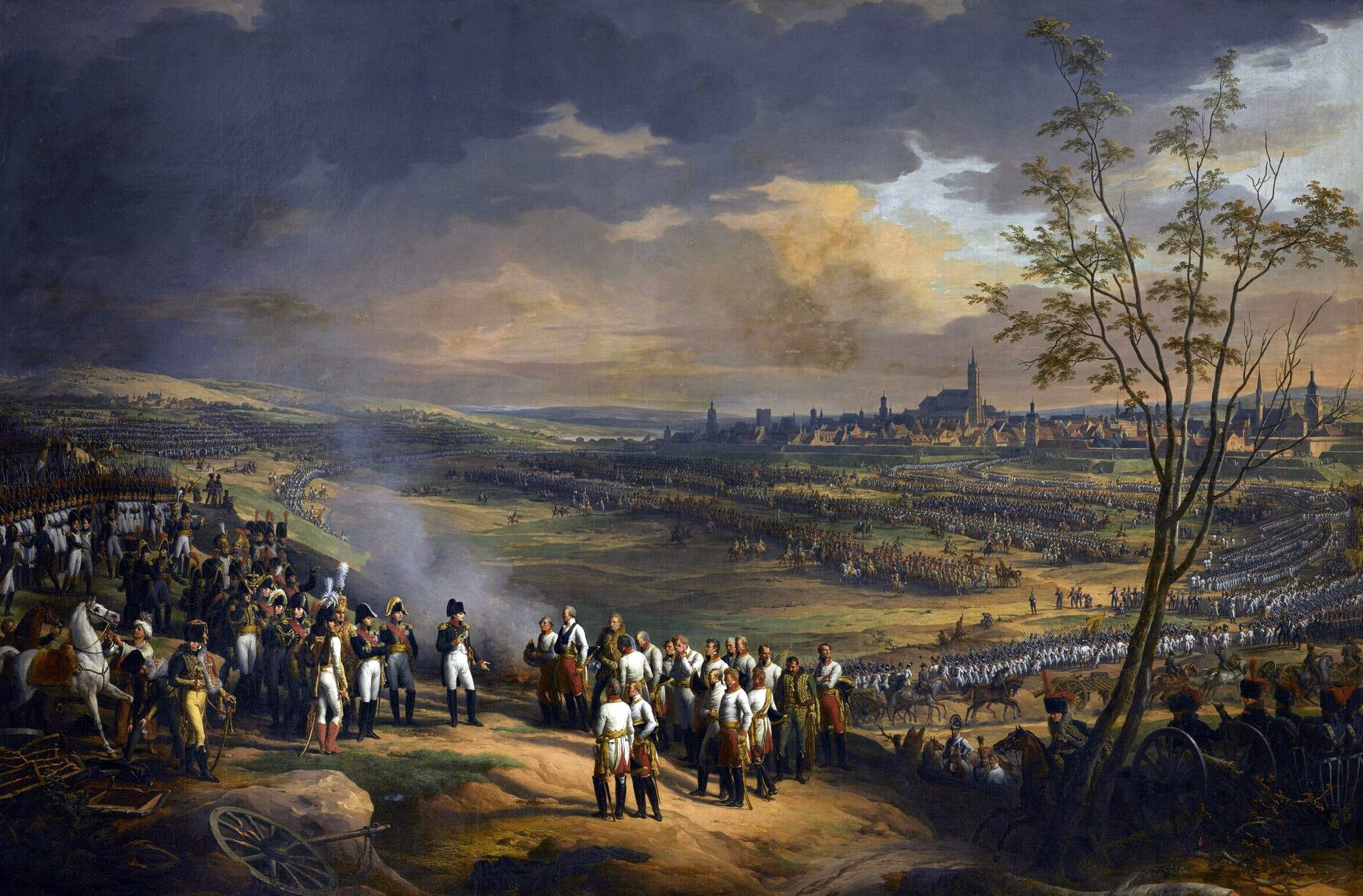
General Mack and his staff surrender the Ulm fortress. Painting by Charles Thévenin

=== Action on the Danube by Vienna ===
The Austrians abstained from the fighting in 1806–1808, and engaged in a military reorganization, directed by Archduke Charles. When they were ready to join the fight against France, in the spring and summer of 1809, it was a remodeled Austrian army that took the field. Despite their internal military reorganization, however, in the War of the Fifth Coalition, the army retained much of its cumbersome command structure, which complicated the issuance of orders and the timely distribution of troops. When the Austrian army took the field in 1809, it battled for the "survival of the [Habsburg] dynasty," as Archduke Charles, the army's supreme commander, described the situation to his brother John.

On the Danubian plains north of Vienna, the summer battles of Aspern-Essling and Wagram shaped the outcome of the 1809 campaign. Klenau's forces played a critical role at both. At Aspern-Essling, Napoleon's army was decisively defeated for the first time in northern Europe, demonstrating that the master of Europe could himself be mastered. After their defeat at Wagram, the Austrians withdrew into Moravia, leaving the French in control of that part of the Danube valley; Wagram was the largest European land-battle to date, engaging 262 battalions and 202 squadrons—153,000 men—for France and her allies, and 160 battalions and 150 squadrons—135,000 men—on the Austrian side.

For Klenau, the campaign started badly at the Battle of Eckmühl (sometimes called Eggmühl), in southeastern Germany on 22 April 1809. Klenau commanded the Advance Guard, which included the 2nd Archduke Charles Legion, the Merveldt Uhlanen and a cavalry battery. Archduke Charles misread Napoleon's intentions and lost the advantage in the battle. Klenau's division suffered heavily and the Archduke Charles Legion was nearly wiped out in a charge by Louis Friant's cavalry. Rosenberg's division on Klenau's flank was also badly mauled and suffered heavy casualties: 534 killed, 637 wounded, 865 missing, and 773 captured.

The disaster at Eckmühl was followed by another at Regensburg (also called the Battle of Ratisbon) on 23 April, where Klenau, at the head of six squadrons of Merveldt's Uhlanen (lancers), was crushed and scattered by Étienne Marie Antoine Champion de Nansouty's heavy cavalry. Klenau and Major General Peter Vécsey stormed back at Nansouty's force with the Klenau chevauxlegers. Although their onslaught threw back the leading French squadrons, the French heavy cavalry returned, joined by Hussars and Chasseurs. In the mêlee, it was difficult to distinguish French from Austrian, but eventually the French horse overwhelmed the Austrian flank and pushed them to the gates of Regensburg.

==== Aspern and Essling ====
By May 1809, the Austrians were pushed to within visual distance of Vienna, and in a critical engagement on the banks of the Danube river, the French and their allies grappled for control of the Marchfeld plain with the Austrians. The French held Lobau island, a vital river crossing, and the Austrians held the heights further to the east. Between them lay several villages, two of which were central in the engagement and gave the battle its name: They lay so close to Vienna that the battle could be seen and heard from the city ramparts and Aspern and Essling (also spelled in German as Eßling) are today part of the Donaustadt, a district of Austrian capital. At the Battle of Aspern-Essling, Klenau commanded a free-standing force of close to 6,000, including a battalion of the 1st Jäger, three battalions of the 3rd Infantry Regiment Archduke Charles, eight squadrons each of the Stipcisc Hussars and Schwarzenburg Uhlans, and a horse artillery battery of 64 guns. Typical confusion in the Austrian command structure meant he received his orders late, and Klenau's delay in deployment meant that his men approached the French III Corps at Essling in daylight and in close order; a two-gun French battery on the plain beyond the Essling, "mowed furrows" of enfilade fire in the Austrian ranks.

Despite the withering fire, Klenau's force reached Essling's edge, where his men set up 64 artillery pieces and bombarded the French for nearly an hour. Taking the village by storm, Austrian cavalry poured into the village from the north, and the French were pushed out in a methodical advance. Klenau's batteries were able to fire on the French-held bridges south of the village, over which the French had to retreat. In bitter house-to-house fighting, the Austrians entered the village. Combat at the granary was especially brutal, as Hungarian grenadiers battled unsuccessfully to dislodge the French from their positions in the second and third floors. The battle resumed at dawn of 22 April. Masséna cleared Aspern of Austrians, but while he did so, Rosenberg's force stormed Jean Lannes' position at Essling. Lannes, reinforced by Vincent Saint-Hilaire's division, subsequently drove Rosenberg out of Essling. At Aspern, Masséna was driven out by Hiller and Bellegarde's counter-attacks.

Meanwhile, Napoleon had launched an attack on the main army at the Austrian center. Klenau's force stood on the immediate right flank of the center, opposite the attacking force of Lannes. The French cavalry, in reserve, prepared to move at either flank, or to the center, depending on where the Austrian line broke first. The French nearly broke through at the center but, at the last minute, Charles arrived with his last reserve, leading his soldiers with a color in his hand. Lannes was checked, and the impetus of the attack died out all along the line. In the final hours of the battle, Lannes himself was cut down by a cannonball from Klenau's artillery. Aspern was lost to the French. The Danube bridges upon which the French relied had been cut again by heavy barges, which the Austrians had released on the river. When he lost his route across the river, Napoleon at once suspended the attack. For his leadership at Essling, Klenau received the Commander's Cross of the Military Order of Maria Theresa.

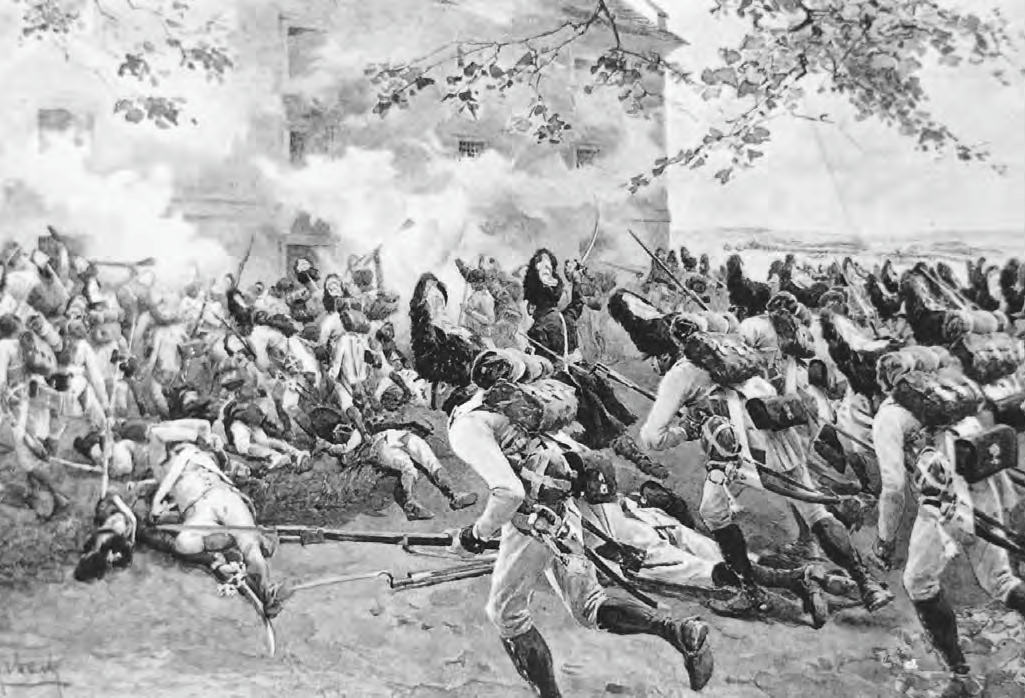
Klenau's grenadiers fought the French in Essling in hand-to-hand combat.

Both sides lost close to 28,000 men, to wounds and death. For Napoleon, whose force was smaller, the losses were more costly. For Charles, the victory, which occurred within visual range of the Vienna ramparts, won him support from the hawks, or the pro-war party, in the Hofburg. The Austrian victory at Aspern-Essling proved that Napoleon could be beaten. His force had been divided (Davout's corps had never made it over the Danube), and Napoleon had underestimated the Austrian strength of force and, more importantly, the tenacity the Austrians showed in situations like that of Essling, when Klenau marched his force across open country under enemy fire. After Aspern-Essling, Napoleon revised his opinion of the Austrian soldier.

==== Wagram ====
In the lull between the Battle of Aspern-Essling and the Battle of Wagram (5–6 July) Charles ordered the construction of a several-mile-long entrenchment, but did little else to shore up his force. Conversely, on the other side of the Danube, Napoleon brought in additional troops from Italy and Hungary. The day prior to the battle at Wagram, Klenau replaced General Johann von Hiller, who had fallen ill, to command the 13,740 soldiers of VI Corps, and Armand von Nordmann replaced him as commander of the Advance Guard. Klenau's Corps stood about 8 kilometers (5 mi) ahead of the main Austrian force. The Corps, about 8,000 men, were ordered to oppose any French advance on the Marchfeld plain. By mid-afternoon, Klenau could see Napoleon's massive force advancing toward them through the cornfields. Klenau managed a spirited, and gradual withdrawal to a position behind the Austrian line at the Russbach, and above the Wagram escarpment; this exposed several of the villages on the western edge of the Marchfield Plain, including Aspern and Essling, to French capture.

On the next day of battle, Klenau was ordered to a forward position, to complete a double-envelopment of Napoleon's force, envisioned by Charles as the best means of inducing panic among the French troops. At dawn, or so, at 04:00, his cannonade rained havoc on Boudet's division of Massena's IV Corps; Massena sent another division under Claude Legrand to support Boudet. Klenau's corps managed to retake both Essling and Aspern, without the same vigorous contest that had occurred two months earlier. Half the pincer movement was well underway, although Klenau's force could not move further ahead: The guns on the Island of Lobau prevented further advance. There was no support from Kollorat's forces on his flank, and for the closing prong of the pincer movement, Archduke John was nowhere in sight; he had not abandoned his baggage, and was plodding slowly, with his army, toward the battlefield, but still a good day's march away. Despite the mile-long gap in the French line, and the advance of Austrian cavalry, Klenau's men could not hold them against André Masséna's prolonged mid-day assault. Charles watched from his command post at Wagram as Klenau's forces stubbornly clung to their positions, but were overwhelmed by the inexorable progress of Masséna's troops, what Klenau later called Masséna's Infernal Column. Klenau organized the rear guard for the Army's retreat into Moravia, and lost 15 percent of his force. General René Savary, who directed part of the French pursuit, wrote that the Klenau's soldiers had "fought in a manner calculated to instill a cautious conduct into any man disposed to deeds of rashness."

=== Aftermath ===
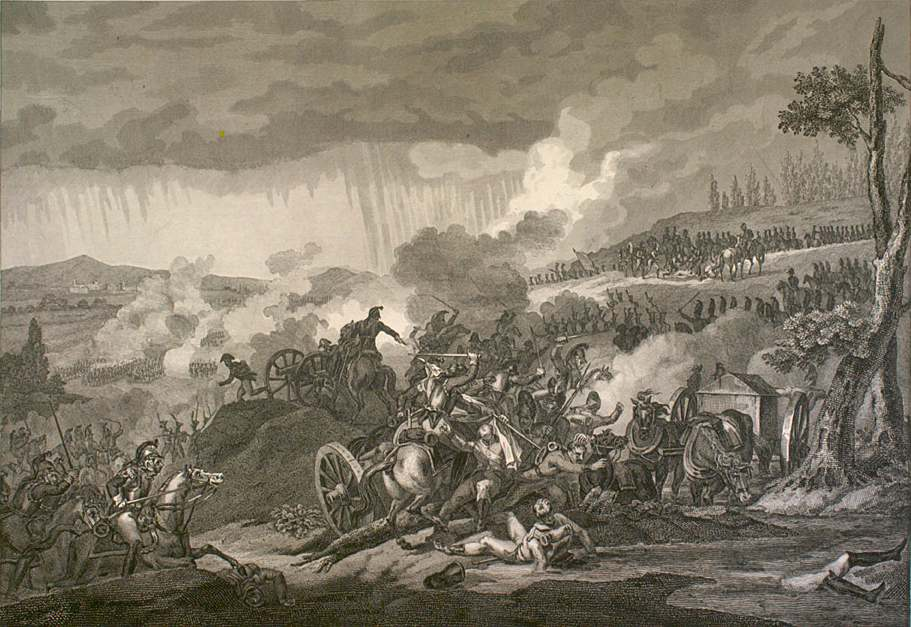
Klenau's force bore the brunt of Murat's cavalry charge at the Battle of Dresden.

As a consequence, Austria withdrew from the Coalition. Although France had not completely defeated them, the Treaty of Schönbrunn, signed on 14 October 1809, imposed a heavy political, territorial, and economic price. France received Carinthia, Carniola, and the Adriatic ports, while Galicia was given to France's ally Poland. The Salzburg area went to the French ally, Bavaria. Austria lost over three million subjects, about 20 percent of her total population, which dramatically reduced the military force that Austria could field. Francis also agreed to pay an indemnity equivalent to almost 85 million francs, gave recognition to Joseph Bonaparte as the king of Spain, and affirmed Habsburg participation in Napoleon's Continental System. Francis reluctantly agreed to Napoleon's marriage with his daughter, Marie Louise, which Napoleon assumed, incorrectly, would eliminate Austria as a future threat.

== War of Liberation 1813 ==
Napoleon engaged in his disastrous Russian campaign in 1812; by 1813, the military landscape was dramatically different. Prussia was the first to defect from Napoleon's cause; possibly the arrival of the remnants of the Grande Armée in Berlin convinced the Prussian leadership that it was not only safe, but expedient. The remains of Napoleon's invasion force staggered back from Russia in early 1813 in appalling condition. Of the I Corps, only 2,281 men of the original 70,000 could be mustered. The Imperial Guard strength fell from 50,000 to 1,533, and 200 of those were disabled by amputation, frostbite, or injuries. Some historians suggest that the nature of the opposition to Napoleon changed in these few months, from opposition by dynasties to opposition by whole peoples, giving the War of the Sixth Coalition its nationalist character.

By the end of April, French forces gained control of Leipzig. At Lützen, on 2 May Napoleon lured a combined Prussian and Russian force into a trap. The Russian commander, Peter Wittgenstein, ignored the primary directive of the Trachenberg plan, attempting to undo Napoleon's capture of Leipzig. After a day of heavy fighting, the combined forces retreated. A few weeks later, at the Battle of Bautzen, 20–21 May 1813, the combined Russian and Prussian force surprised Ney's corps in a confused assault, which narrowly escaped destruction when Napoleon appeared with reinforcements. The outwitted Blücher and Wittgenstein escaped because Michel Ney failed to block the retreat. Despite his string of victories, Napoleon sought an armistice in early June, to allow a series of negotiations, to take place in Prague. The Armistice of Poischwitz, signed 4 June 1813, established a cease-fire throughout central and eastern Europe that was intended to last until mid-July; the combatants had to give six days' notice of its termination. The various interested parties—Russian, Prussian, Austrian, Saxon, Swedish, Bavarian, British and others—explored the possibilities of new alliances.

=== Changes in Coalition Strategy ===
While delegates bickered in Prague, similar to the situation in Rastatt in 1799, the diplomats negotiated throughout the war zone and in the capitals of Europe, to create a new set of alliances. The subsequent Sixth Coalition (Russia, Prussia, Britain, Sweden and, eventually, Austria), differed significantly from the earlier coalitions. Unlike previous coalitions in which the participants had organized their armies independently of one another, the Allies of the Sixth Coalition created multi-national armies. This theoretically accomplished two goals: Napoleon could not defeat them piecemeal, and the presence of soldiers from several states within a single armed force limited "politically motivated acts of national self-interest." Klenau, promoted to General der Kavallerie (full general) on 26 July 1813, held command of an independent corps in the Army of Bohemia. This Army of Bohemia illustrated one of the biggest differences in the Sixth Coalition's organizational schema: it included 127,435 Austrians, 78,200 Russians, and 44,907 Prussians.

The Coalition also pursued a different operational plan. The Coalition's operational strategy brought its different forces closer and closer together in concentric circles, to a single point in Saxony. Known as the Trachenberg Plan, the Sixth Coalition's operating plan established clear, concise and specific guidelines for commanders, from the Army through the basic company level: act offensively against an inferior foe; act defensively against a superior foe, underscoring to commanders at all levels the risk of underestimating the threat of Napoleon and his army. The new plan divided the Allied force into three armies: Silesia, Bohemia, and Northern Germany. The Silesian army, composed of Prussians and Russians, left 50,000 men in the province of Silesia and moved the remaining 100,000 to join with 120,000 Austrians in Saxony. The Crown Prince of Sweden, Jean-Baptiste Bernadotte, a former Marshal of France and a favorite of Napoleon's, established an army of observation at Hamburg and Lübeck, and another 70,000 concentrated 50 kilometers (31 mi) southwest of Berlin. Using this plan, the Coalition pushed Napoleon and his allies into an increasingly smaller circle of operation. In theory, while this concentrated Napoleon's force, it also limited his maneuvering options. Furthermore, it concentrated the Coalition forces around the French and Allied armies, ultimately at the Saxon cities of Dresden, and then Leipzig.

=== Battle of Dresden ===
Strategically, the Battle of Dresden demonstrated the problems of the Coalition's strategy. On 25 August, the three monarchs—Alexander II of Russia, Francis II of Austria, and Frederick William III of Prussia—and their staffs assembled on an overlook of the city to discuss their strategy. The city's weak defenses were clear from this vantage point: the French and Saxon garrison of 20,000 men under Marshal Saint-Cyr could not hope to hold a city of that size. The Tsar and General Jean Victor Moreau, formerly a General of France and by 1813 an adviser to the Coalition, wanted to attack at once; Schwarzenberg wanted to wait until additional forces arrived.

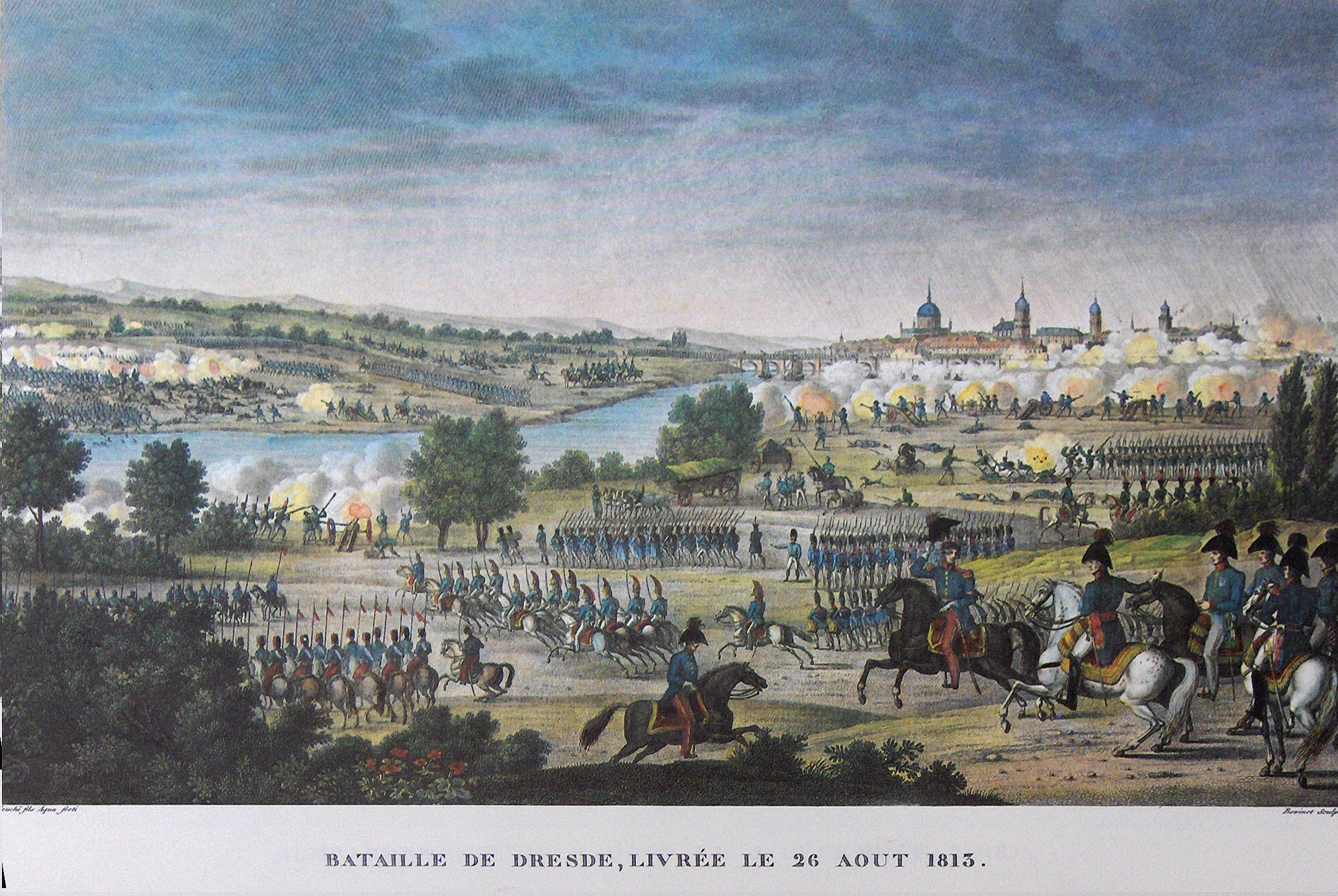
A cavalry charge at the Battle of Dresden, 1813

By waiting one day, the Coalition lost the advantage. As the Coalition assaulted the southern suburbs of the city, Napoleon arrived from the north and west with the Guard and Marmont's VI Corps, covering 140 kilometers (87 mi) in forced marches over three days. The leading elements of Klenau's corps were placed on the army's left flank, separated from the main body by the Weißeritz, flooded after almost a week of rain. Marshal Joachim Murat took advantage of this isolation and inflicted heavy losses on the Austrians. A French participant observed, separating Klenau's corps from the Austrian army, Murat "hurl[ed] himself upon it at the head of the carabineers and cuirassiers. His movement was decisive; Klenau could not resist that terrible charge. Nearly all his battalions were compelled to lay down their arms, and two other divisions of infantry shared their fate." Murat captured intact a division of five infantry regiments (15,000 men) under command of Lieutenant Field Marshal Joseph, Baron von Mesko de Felsö-Kubiny, plus 15 of their regimental and company colors. As the left wing disintegrated, the French swarmed over the flank; the right wing was also driven back, and the entire force had to withdraw.

After the immediate defense of Dresden, though, Napoleon's situation deteriorated. Vandamme pursued the retreating Army of Bohemia, expecting to be supported by St. Cyr and General Marmont, who were still busy in Dresden. Vandamme approached the Russian corps commanded by Ostermann-Tolstoy, but left a valley behind him unprotected as he descended out of the mountain into Bohemia. As he engaged Ostermann-Tolstoy, he saw some troops behind him, which soon attacked him; thus beset from two sides, his young troops were unable to defend themselves; at the Battle of Kulm, Vandamme lost his entire artillery, and the Austrians acquired about 7,500 prisoners, including the general himself.

To the north of Dresden, as Napoleon appeared to be engaged, looking elsewhere, Blücher brought his troops south, toward the city. Realizing the danger, Napoleon directed his main army north again, to repel the Prussians; as he did so, the wiley Blücher withdrew. Other portions of the French army had comparable difficulties. Marshal Oudinot was repelled by Bernadotte at the Battle of Großbeeren, and MacDonald, near the Bober river. Furthermore, Napoleon began to suffer from illness, referred to variously as a colic or fatigue.

=== Battle of Leipzig ===
From 12 to 15 October, the days of skirmishing preliminary to the Battle of Leipzig (16–19 October), Klenau's force took the heavily defended village Liebertwolkwitz, but were forced out in a French counter-attack. A contemporary witness later described finding dead Austrians at the church cemetery, pinned to the walls with bayonets. Klenau's primary objective was the village of Liebertwolkwitz. He took the Kolmberg, a nearby height also known as the Schwedenschanze (Swedish fortification), a defensive remnant of the Thirty Years' War about 4 kilometers (2 mi) east of the village, and established a battery there, but did not bring enough troops to support it. An attack by 4,000 of Jacques MacDonald's infantry secured the hill; although Klenau's cavalry managed to push the French back, they could not retake the hill. In the action, Klenau's own horse was shot and killed, and he was nearly captured, but he struggled back to his line, and reorganized his men.

Eventually, Klenau's corps took the village and the Kolmberg several times, to be pushed out by the French, to counter-attack, retreat, counter-attack and retreat and this see-sawing back and forth, the attacks, counter-attacks experienced by Klenau's force, were characteristic of the battle. On the critical first day of the battle, 16 October, a French 100-gun artillery barrage forced a hole in the line between the Russian and Prussian forces on Klenau's flank. When Murat's cavalry charged the hole, Klenau's corps, plus reserve cavalry, eventually forced the Murat's troops back to the cover of the French artillery. Klenau's force made a short retreat, leaving a detachment at the Kolmberg. By mid-afternoon, the Allied columns had been driven to their starting positions, but had maintained their line; as one part of the line was forced back, its flanks dropped back with it, maintaining a continuous line and preventing a French flanking operation. In this first-day action, Klenau's force played a vital role in preventing MacDonald from flanking Prince Schwarzenberg's main army. On the night of the 16th, the French controlled the Kolmberg that Klenau had fought over all day, and a Hessian soldier wrote: "it was the worst bivouac we had experienced on this campaign. The weather was wet and windy ... we had to use water from puddles in which lay the blood of men and horses ... and half the men remained under arms at all times."

=== Klenau and the Siege of Dresden ===
After the battle, the allied high command assigned Klenau to blockade the large French garrison at Dresden. His IV Austrian Corps of the Army of Bohemia included the division of Lt. General Alexander Ivanovich, Count Ostermann-Tolstoy, and the militia of Major General Alexey Nikolayevich Titov, a total of approximately 41,000 troops. Klenau eventually negotiated a capitulation in which the French troops would return to France with their honors, on condition that they would not fight against the Allies for six months. Marshal Laurent de Gouvion Saint-Cyr surrendered to Klenau on 11 November, but Schwarzenburg refused to agree to the capitulation and the French troops marched into captivity into Austria instead. The victors took 94 French field guns and 151 Saxon fortress guns, and wrested from the French complete control over the Kingdom of Saxony.

== War in France 1814–1815 and post-war career ==
Promotions

- Major: 15 January 1790
- Lt. Colonel: 12 February 1793
- Colonel: 8 August 1795
- Major General: 1 May 1797 (effective 13 June 1797)
- Lt. Field Marshal: 29 October 1800 (effective 18 November 1800)
- General of the Cavalry: 26 July 1813

During the 1814 campaigns, Klenau remained with the Army of Bohemia as it approached Paris slowly, from the south-east, via the Seine river valley. The armies would be as many as 32 kilometers (20 mi) apart. Their communications would be conducted through Wittgenstein's cavalry and some irregular cossacks, which was directly opposite to the Trachenberg plan. Schwarzenberg knew it was exactly what Napoleon would want them to do, but reluctantly agreed to it. Afterward, Klenau commanded a corps in Italy, known as the Korps Klenau. After the war ended again in 1815, Klenau was appointed commanding general in Moravia and Silesia. He held this office until his death on 6 October 1819 at Brno, in the modern-day Czech Republic.
