= Tolstoj =

Tolstoj may refer to:

- Tolstoy (surname), alternative transliteration
  - Leo Tolstoy, Russian writer, the most notable person with the surname
- Tolstoj (crater)
- Tolstoj quadrangle
- 2810 Lev Tolstoj

== See also ==
- Tolstoy (disambiguation)
