= Tolstoy (surname) =

Tolstoy (Russian: Толстой) is a surname associated with the noble Russian Tolstoy family (feminine form: Tolstaya; Russian: Толста́я). The name is derived from the Russian adjective то́лстый (tolsty; 'thick, stout, fat'). The family name is shared by three major Russian writers of the 19th–20th centuries, of whom two also share first names Alexei, and one of these has the same patronymic Nikolaevich (Nicholas's son) with the best known of them — Lev or Leo Tolstoy (1828–1910). Notable people with the surname include:

- Tolstoy (family), Nobility with origins in the 15th century
- Aleksey Nikolayevich Tolstoy (1883–1945) 'Comrade Count', writer of science fiction and historical novels
- Aleksey Konstantinovich Tolstoy (1817–1875), poet and writer of historical dramas, second cousin of Leo Tolstoy
- Alexander Ivanovich Ostermann-Tolstoy (1770–1857), soldier, later military consultant to Ibrahim-pasha in Egypt
- Alexandra Tolstaya (1884–1970), youngest daughter of Leo Tolstoy and founder of Tolstoy Foundation
- Alexandra Tolstoy (born 1974), born Alexandra Tolstoy-Miloslavsky, British equine adventurer, broadcaster and businesswoman
- Dmitry Tolstoy (1823–1889), Russian statesman and historian
- Fyodor Tolstoy (disambiguation)
  - Fyodor Petrovich Tolstoy (1783–1873), Russian artist
  - Fyodor Ivanovich Tolstoy (The American) (1782–1846), Fyodor Petrovich's cousin, Russian adventurer and bonvivant
- Georgy Tolstoy (1927–2025), Soviet and Russian scholar of civil law
- Ilya Tolstoy (1866–1933), writer and son of Leo Tolstoy
- Ilya Andreyevich Tolstoy (1903–1970), U.S. Army Colonel, F. D. Roosevelt's envoy in Tibet, grandson of Leo Tolstoy
- Ivan Tolstoy, multiple people
- Maya Tolstoy, marine geophysicist investigating earthquakes in the deep sea
- Natalia Tolstaya (1943–2010), writer and translator
- Nikolai Tolstoy (born 1935), English-Russian author and former parliamentary candidate of the UK Independence Party
- Pyotr Aleksandrovich Tolstoy (1769–1844), general and statesman
- Pyotr Andreyevich Tolstoy (1645–1729), statesman and diplomat
- Sophia Tolstaya (1844–1919), diarist and wife of Leo Tolstoy
- Svetlana Tolstaya (born 1971), Kazakh race walker
- Tatyana Tolstaya (born 1951), Russian writer and TV host, mother of Artemy Lebedev, Russian designer and businessman (born 1974)
- Viktoria Tolstoy (born 1974), Swedish jazz singer
- Yegor Tolstoy (1802–1874), Russian lieutenant-general, senator, and governor
- Tatyana Sukhotina-Tolstaya (1864 – 1950), Russian painter and memoirist, oldest daughter of Leo Tolstoy
- Pyotr Olegovich Tolstoy (born 1974), Russian journalist and statesman
