= XIV Corps (Grande Armée) =

- Active: 1813
- Country: First French Empire
- Branch: French Imperial Army
- Size: Corps
- Engagements: War of the Sixth Coalition

Commanders
- Notable commanders: Laurent Gouvion Saint-Cyr

The XIV Corps of the Grande Armée was a French military formation that existed for several months during the Napoleonic Wars. The corps was organized in the summer of 1813 and Marshal Laurent Gouvion Saint-Cyr was appointed as its commander. The formation was made up of four French infantry divisions, one cavalry division, and supporting artillery. The XIV Corps was stationed near Dresden to watch the passes of the Ore Mountains, which were the border between the hostile Austrian Empire and the allied Kingdom of Saxony. Saint-Cyr's corps played a major role in Emperor Napoleon I's victory at the Battle of Dresden in late August. Since it was assigned to garrison Dresden, the XIV Corps missed the Battle of Leipzig in October. Isolated after Napoleon's decisive defeat at Leipzig, the unit endured the Siege of Dresden which ended in November with a French surrender.

== Order of battle ==
=== Dresden, 1813 ===
XIV Corps: Marshal Laurent Gouvion Saint-Cyr

- 42nd Division: General of Division Pierre-Louis Dupas
  - 9th Light Infantry Regiment
  - 10th Light Infantry Regiment
  - 11th Light Infantry Regiment
  - 12th Light Infantry Regiment
  - 39th Line Infantry Regiment
  - 40th Line Infantry Regiment
  - 43rd Line Infantry Regiment
  - 63rd Line Infantry Regiment
  - 96th Line Infantry Regiment
- 43rd Division: General of Division Michel Marie Claparède
  - 27th Light Infantry Regiment
  - 29th Light Infantry Regiment
  - 27th Line Infantry Regiment
  - 45th Line Infantry Regiment
  - 65th Line Infantry Regiment
  - 95th Line Infantry Regiment
  - 100th Line Infantry Regiment
  - 103rd Line Infantry Regiment
- 44th Division: General of Division Pierre Berthezène
  - 8th Light Infantry Regiment (2 battalions)
  - 16th Light Infantry Regiment (1 battalion)
  - 18th Light Infantry Regiment (1 battalion)
  - 24th Line Infantry Regiment
  - 39th Line Infantry Regiment
  - 50th Line Infantry Regiment
  - 54th Line Infantry Regiment
  - 64th Line Infantry Regiment
  - 75th Line Infantry Regiment
  - 79th Line Infantry Regiment
- 45th Division: General of Division Louis-Nicolas de Razout
  - 6th Light Infantry Regiment
  - 17th Light Infantry Regiment
  - 5th Line Infantry Regiment
  - 8th Line Infantry Regiment
  - 11th Line Infantry Regiment
  - 28th Line Infantry Regiment
  - 32nd Line Infantry Regiment
  - 60th Line Infantry Regiment
- Cavalry elements:
  - 14th Hussar and Italian Chasseurs-à-Cheval Regiments
  - 7th and 8th Chevau-léger Lancer Regiments
  - 16th Polish Cavalry Regiment
- Other infantry elements:
  - 21st, 25th, and 26th Light Infantry Regiments
  - 34th, 37th, 58th, 76th, 79th, and 81st Line Infantry Regiments
  - 5th, 6th, and 7th Neapolitan Line Infantry Regiments
  - 13th Polish Line Infantry Regiment

Source: Smith, Digby (1998). The Napoleonic Wars Data Book. London: Greenhill. p. 478. ISBN 1-85367-276-9.
