= Siege of Dresden (1813) =

1813 siege during the War of the Sixth Coalition

- Part of the German campaign of the Sixth Coalition
Date	10 October 1813 – 11 November 1813
Location	Dresden, Kingdom of Saxony 51°03′00″N 13°44′24″E
Result	Austro-Russian victory

Belligerents
(First French Empire) French Empire	Austria; Russian Empire

Commanders and leaders
(First French Empire) Laurent Gouvion Saint-Cyr	(Austrian Empire) Johann von Klenau (Russian Empire) Alexander Ostermann-Tolstoy

Casualties and losses
35,000 captured	
- Location within Europe

The siege of Dresden was a siege during the German campaign of 1813 of the War of the Sixth Coalition.

== Background ==
After the Battle of Dresden, Napoleon had ordered Laurent Gouvion Saint-Cyr, commanding XIV Corps, to garrison Dresden.

== Siege ==
After the French defeat at the Battle of Leipzig the garrison of Dresden was cut off and eventually besieged by the Russian Corps commanded by Alexander Ostermann-Tolstoy which was joined on 26 October by the Austrian IV Corps commanded by Johann von Klenau .

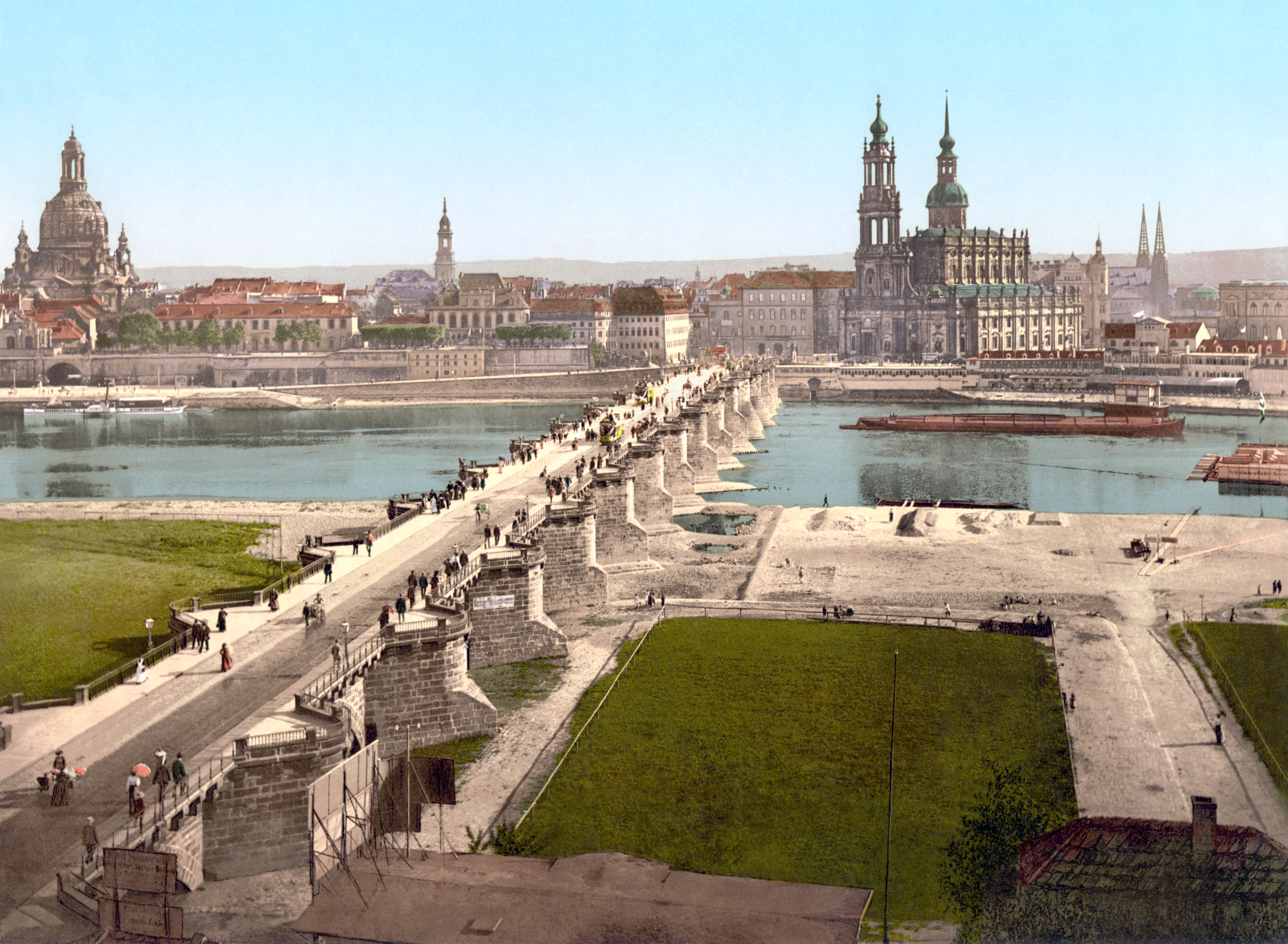

== Surrender ==
Saint-Cyr surrendered to Klenau on 11 November 1813. Alongside Saint-Cyr; 11 Divisional Generals, 19 Brigade Generals, 1,759 officers and 33,744 men were captured as well as 94 guns.
