= Battle of Kulm =

1813 battle of the War of the Sixth Coalition

- Part of the German campaign of 1813
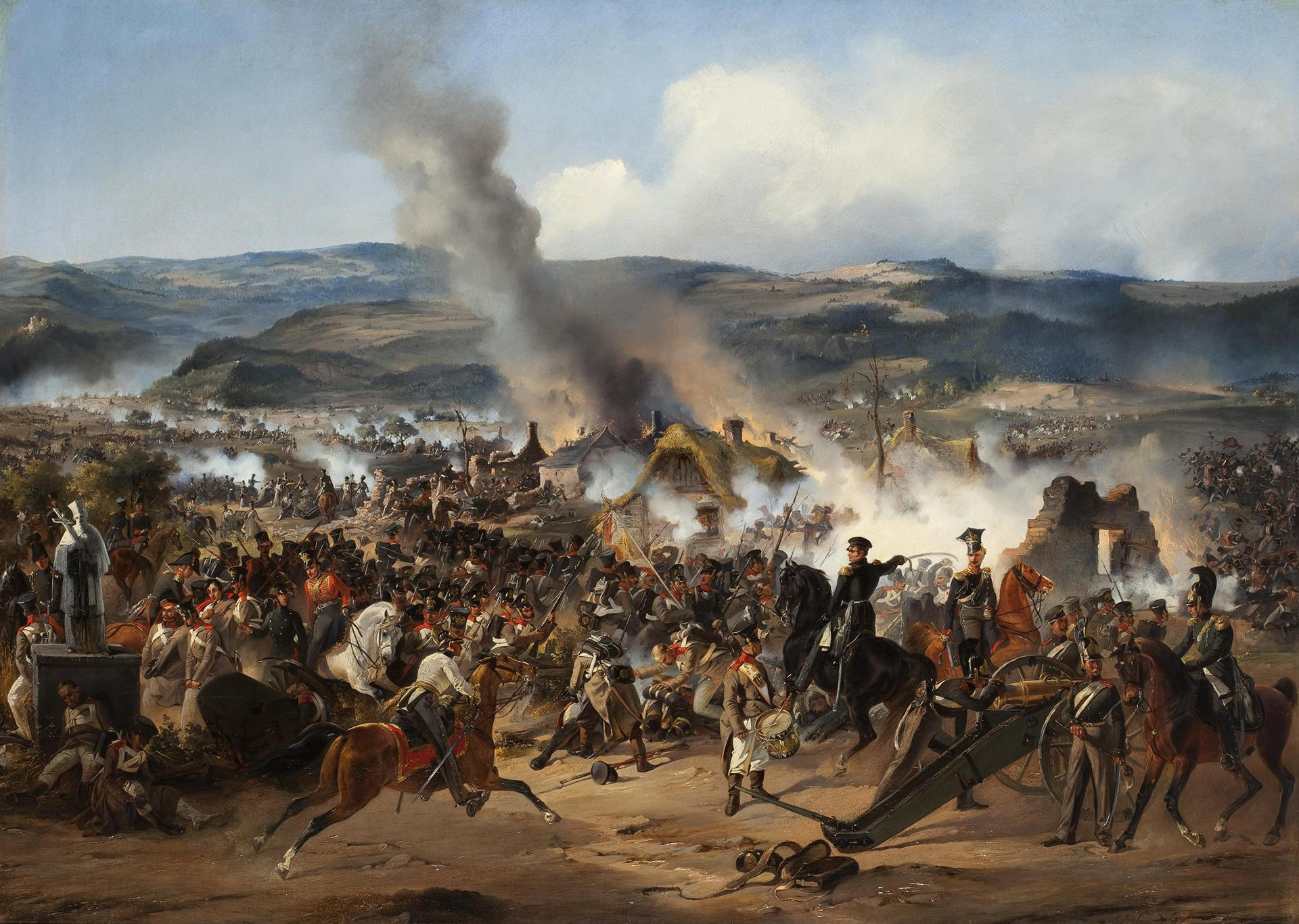
- Battle of Kulm; Alexander von Kotzebue, 1843
| Date | 29–30 August 1813 (Note: O.S. 17–18 August) |
| Location | Kulm, Bohemia 50°41′50″N 13°56′20″E |
| Result | Coalition victory |

Belligerents
| France | Russia; Austria; Prussia |

Commanders and leaders
| (First French Empire) Dominique Vandamme (POW) | (Russian Empire) Alexander Osterman-Tolstoy (WIA); (Russian Empire) Alexey Yermolov; (Russian Empire) Mikhail Barclay de Tolly (Russian Empire) Mikhail Miloradovich; (Austrian Empire) Hieronymus von Colloredo-Mansfeld; (Kingdom of Prussia) Friedrich von Kleist |

Strength
| 32,000–37,000 | Initially: 15,000–16,000; Totally: 103,000 (Note: 103,000 total: of these, 54,000 were made up of 44,000 Russians and 10,000 Prussians) |

Casualties and losses
| 13,000 to 25,000 (Note: 13,000; 17,000; 25,000) Details: 6,000–9,000 killed or wounded; 7,000–8,000 captured; 48–81 guns; 2 Imperial Eagles; 2 guidons. | 11,000 to 12,319 (Note: 11,000; 12,000; 12,319) Details: 11,000 killed or wounded; 1,000 captured. |
- Location within Europe

War of the Sixth Coalition:
German campaign
current battle
Napoleon in command
Napoleon not in command

The Battle of Kulm was fought near the town Kulm (Czech: Chlumec) and the village Přestanov (then called Priesten) in northern Bohemia. It was fought on 29–30 August 1813, during the War of the Sixth Coalition. A French corps under General Dominique Vandamme attacked Alexander Osterman-Tolstoy's Russian corps on 29 August. The next day, Friedrich von Kleist's Prussian corps hit Vandamme in the rear while Russian and Austrian reinforcements attacked the French front and left. Vandamme was defeated with the loss of between 13,000 and 25,000 men and 82 guns. Frederick William created an award for those who distinguished themselves in battle, the Kulm Cross.

== Background ==
Following the French victory at Dresden, Vandamme pursued the retreating allies. Napoleon sent Marshals Gouvion Saint Cyr and Auguste Marmont to support Vandamme's corps. With Vandamme in advance, Saint Cyr's and Marmont's corps brought up the rear. Vandamme caught up with Alexander Ivanovich Ostermann-Tolstoy's forces near the town of Kulm, 8 kilometres (5.0 mi) northwest of Aussig (now Ústí nad Labem in the Czech Republic).

== Battle ==
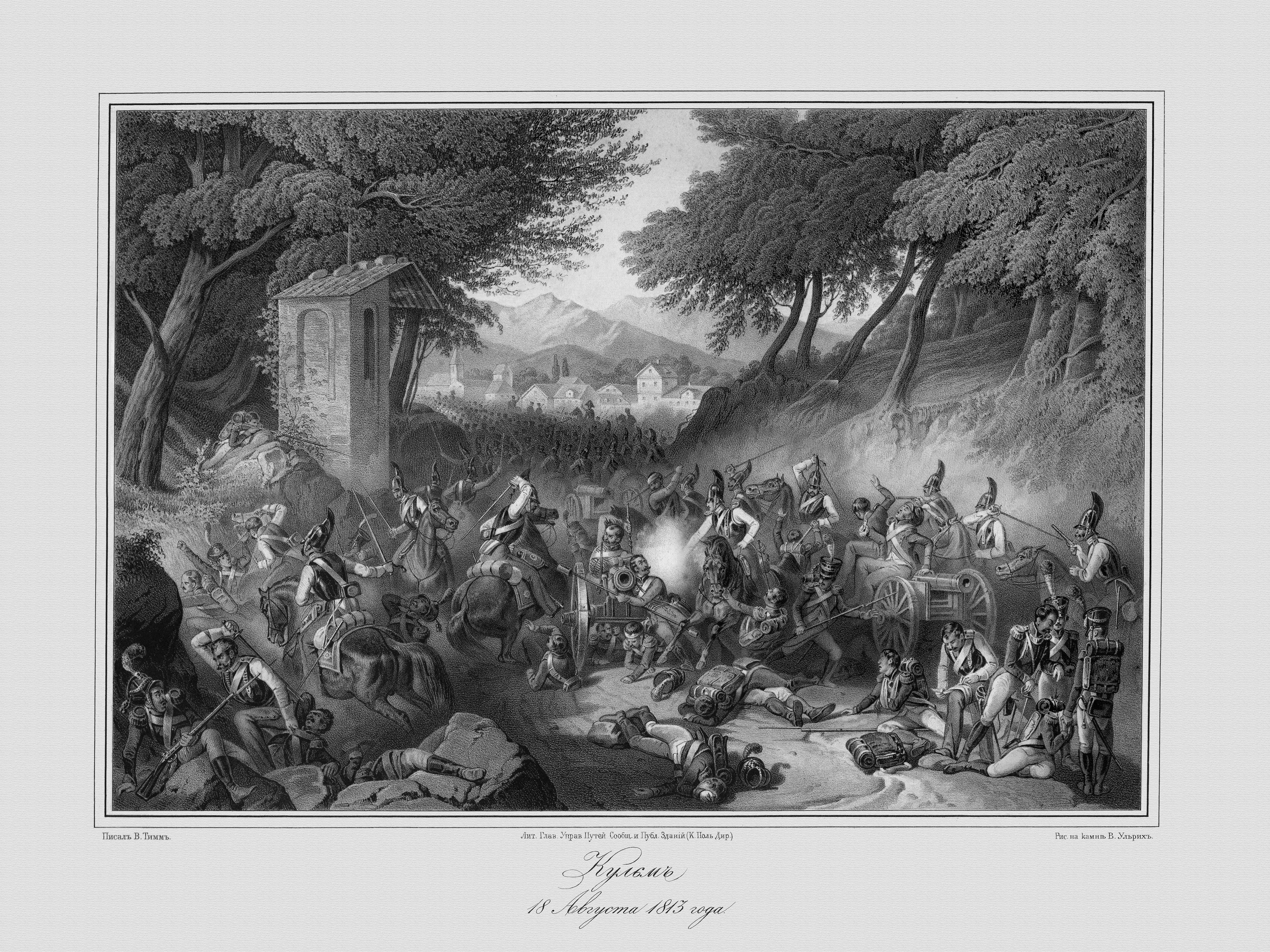
Charge of the cuirassiers at Kulm

On 29 August, Vandamme, with 34,000 soldiers and 84 guns at his disposal, attacked Russian formations forming a rearguard for the retreating Coalition army, at 14,700 to 16,000 strong, under the command of Russian general Ostermann-Tolstoy. The situation was very dangerous for the allies; if Vandamme won the battle, the French would take the passes in the mountains, and the retreating Coalition army could be trapped by Napoleon. However, Ostermann-Tolstoy rallied all of his troops for a stiff defense; he was seriously wounded, losing his left hand, but was replaced by his subordinate Aleksei Petrovich Yermolov. By the end of the day the Allies had 20,000 men. All of Vandamme's attacks were repulsed, and his situation got worse on the next day. A Prussian army corps commanded by Friedrich von Kleist attacked Vandamme's rearguard. Kleist then received help from a combined Russian and Austrian attack on his front, under the command of Generals Mikhail Bogdanovich Barclay de Tolly and von Colloredo-Mansfeld. In an attempt to repulse simultaneous attacks on his front and rear, Vandamme ordered his forces to form squares. The inexperienced French troops were unable to fend off the allies, and soon withdrew from the battlefield, with heavy losses, including Vandamme himself as a captured prisoner of war.

== Casualties ==
The French lost between 13,000 and 25,000 of the pursuing force of 34,000, including Vandamme, and almost all of his artillery, 82 of his 84 guns, were captured. The allies lost approximately 11,000 soldiers killed or wounded.

In Vandamme's corps there were two Polish regiments of Uhlans, part of cavalry divisions under the command of General Jean Corbineau. These regiments were used by Vandamme to defend against enemy cavalry charges. One regiment, commanded by Colonel Maximilian Fredro (brother of playwright Alexander Fredro), was attacked after withdrawing to a defile and surrendered. The other regiment of Uhlans, under the command of Count Tomasz Łubieński (generally known in English as Thomas Lubienski) successfully withdrew.

== Aftermath ==
While Marshal MacDonald's defeat at Katzbach coincided with Napoleon's victory at Dresden, the Coalition success at Kulm eventually negated his victory, given that Napoleon's troops never completely crushed the enemy. Thus, by winning this battle, Ostermann-Tolstoy and his troops succeeded in buying much needed time for the Coalition armies to regroup after the Battle of Dresden for the Battle of Wartenburg and subsequently for the Battle of Leipzig.

=== Insults ===
According to a French anecdote, after the battle Vandamme was brought to and accused by Emperor Alexander I of Russia of being a brigand and plunderer. He retorted, "I am neither a plunderer nor a brigand, but in any case, my contemporaries and history will not reproach me for having murdered my own father." This statement apparently hinted at the widespread belief that Alexander I was implicated in the murder of his father, Emperor Paul I.

== The battlefield today ==
The battlefield is mostly built over. There is a large monument topped with a lion next door to the Hotel Napoleon.

== Sources ==
- Bodart, Gaston (1908). Militär-historisches Kriegs-Lexikon (1618–1905).
- Clodfelter, M. (2008). Warfare and armed conflicts : a statistical encyclopedia of casualty and other figures, 1494–2007. Jefferson, North Carolina: McFarland. ISBN 978-0786433193.
- Leggiere, Michael V. (2015). Napoleon and the Struggle for Germany: The Franco-Prussian War of 1813. Cambridge University Press.
- Marbot, Jean-Baptiste Antoine Marcelin (2011). The Memoirs of General Baron de Marbot. Vol. II. Archived from the original on 19 May 2011.
- Eggenberger, David (1985). An Encyclopedia of Battles. New York: Dover Publications. ISBN 0-486-24913-1.
- Velichko, Konstantin; Novitsky, Vasily; Schwarz, Alexey; Apushkin, Vladimir; Schulz, Gustav (1915). Sytin Military Encyclopedia (in Russian). Vol. 14. Тип. Т-ва И.Д. Сытина.

| Preceded by Battle of Dresden | Napoleonic Wars; Battle of Kulm | Succeeded by Battle of San Marcial |
