= Ivan Tolstoy =

Ivan Tolstoy may refer to:

- Ivan Andreyevich Tolstoy (1644–1713), Russian officer in the army of Tsar Peter I
- Ivan Ivanovich Tolstoy (1858–1916), Imperial Russian politician
- Ivan Matveyevich Tolstoy (1806–1867), Russian nobleman, diplomat, senator, grand master of court ceremonies, and minister of postal service
- Ivan Tolstoy (scientist) (1923–2023), American geophysicist and popular science writer
