= Lev-Tolstovsky =

Lev-Tolstovsky (masculine), Lev-Tolstovskaya (feminine), or Lev-Tolstovskoye (neuter) may refer to:

- Lev-Tolstovsky District, a district of Lipetsk Oblast, Russia
- Lev-Tolstovsky (rural locality), a rural locality (a settlement) in Kursk Oblast, Russia
