= Fyodor Tolstoy =

Fyodor Tolstoy may refer to:

- Fyodor Petrovich Tolstoy (1783–1873), Russian artist
- Fyodor Ivanovich Tolstoy (The American) (1782–1846), Fyodor Petrovich's cousin, Russian adventurer and bonvivant
