= Alexander Ivanovich Ostermann-Tolstoy =

Russian general and noble (1770–1857)

Count Alexander Ivanovich Osterman-Tolstoy
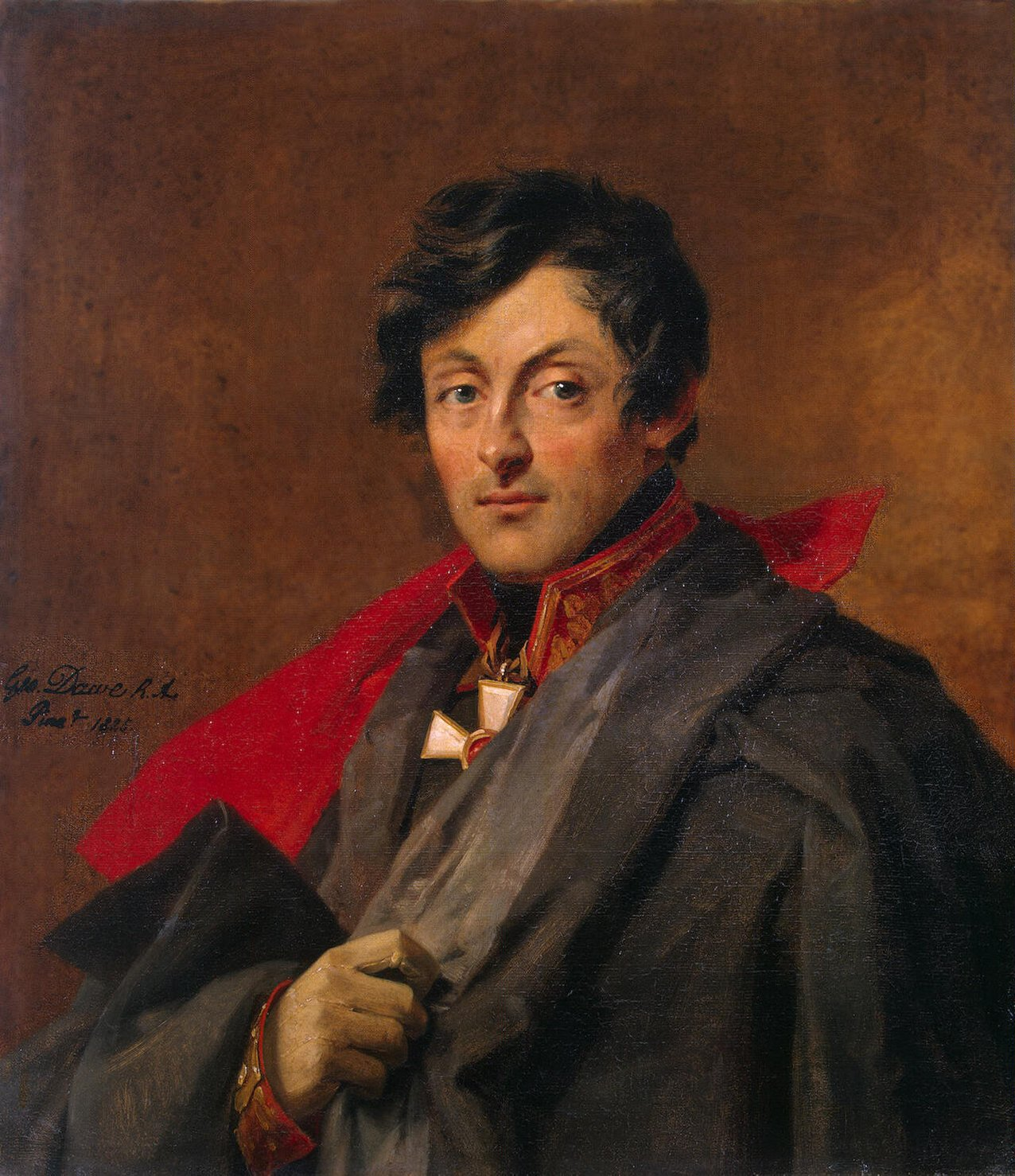
- Portrait by George Dawe, 1825
- Born: 1770
- Died: February 12, 1857 (aged 87); Geneva, Switzerland
- Occupations: Military commander; diplomat
- Honours: Order of St. George (2nd class); Military Order of Maria Theresa

Count Alexander Ivanovich Ostermann-Tolstoy (or Osterman-Tolstoy; Russian: Александр Иванович Остерман-Толстой, romanized: Aleksandr Ivanovich Osterman-Tolstoy; 1770 – 12 February 1857) was a Russian Imperial general of the infantry, best known for his services during the French Revolutionary and Napoleonic Wars. He belonged to the famous Tolstoy family. Being in numerical inferiority while commanding the rear guard on the first day of the Battle of Kulm, he held out against the onslaught of French forces but lost his left arm.

== Early life ==
Count Alexander Ivanovich Osterman-Tolstoy was the son of the Lieutenant-General Ivan Matveevich Tolstoy (1746–1808) and his wife Agrafena Ilyinichna, nee Bibikova, "of ancient Tatar stock", and which, as per another member of the family, historian Nikolai Tolstoy, "may account for Alexander's dark complexion." He was the grandson of Anna Andreyevna Tolstaya (née Countess Ostermann), daughter of Andrey Osterman, a famous associate of Peter the Great. Empress Catherine II allowed Tolstoy to assume the title of count, with the surname and coat of arms of the Ostermann family.

== Military service ==
He began his military service during the Turco-Russian war of 1787–1791. In 1796, his two childless great-uncles, Fedor and Ivan Osterman, brothers of his paternal grandmother, gave him their family name, the title of count and a large fortune. Count Osterman-Tolstoy did not leave the military service. In 1798 he was already a major-general, and received the rank of lieutenant general in 1805.

He participated in all major Russian battles of the Napoleonic Wars in 1805–1814. Upon his return from the campaign in northern Germany in 1805, he was named Governor of St. Petersburg. He played a key role in the Battle of Czarnowo on the night and following morning of 23–24 December 1806. In 1811, he inherited the title of Count Osterman from his childless great uncle, Ivan Osterman, the last of the Osterman line. During 1812–1814 commanded a corps, distinguishing himself in the Battle of Ostrovno on 25 July 1812 and in the Battle of Kulm 29–30 August 1813. He participated in the 1812 campaigns as a Commander of the 4th Army Corps, under the overall command of Johann von Klenau. Osterman-Tolstoy was wounded in the Battle of Bautzen (21–22 May 1813), before fighting at Dresden, being at Dresden again, and at the Battle of Leipzig. His corps defended the gorges in the mountains of Bohemia and captured General Vandamme. During the battle the count lost his left hand, as Emperor Alexander I put it, "by sacrificing his hand he bought us victory".

In 1815, Osterman-Tolstoy briefly had a diplomatic assignment to Paris. In 1817, he was appointed as general of the infantry.

Count Osterman-Tolstoy remained in service until 1826, after Alexander's I death he retired and started traveling around Europe and the Middle East in the company of the scholar Jakob Philipp Fallmerayer. In 1831, he was a military consultant to Ibrahim-pasha in Egypt and participated in actions against the Turks.

== Later years ==
He never returned to Russia and shared his time between Italy and Switzerland. He loved practical jokes and hoaxes. According to his contemporaries he was "a remarkable and original person, distinguished by his frankness and generosity. Even among his famous contemporaries he could be singled out. Fearlessness, courage, and endurance in battle were his characteristics as a military officer."

Count Osterman-Tolstoy was married to Princess Elisabeth Alexeevna Galitzine (1779–1853) from 1799; they had no children. He had foreign mistresses and a lot of illegitimate children. There is an engraving, published in Pisa in 1827, on which Count Osterman-Tolstoy is depicted sitting beside a pram with a sleeping baby and two older children playing nearby; the inscription says, ‘Je me flatte que c’est les derniers faries (sic). A 55 ans il est temps de faire la clôture.’ (I flatter myself with the thought that it’s my last extravagancy. At the age of 55 one must stop).

Osterman-Tolstoy finally settled in Le Petit-Saconnex in Geneva, Switzerland, in 1837, where he died in 1857.

== Sources ==
- "Остерман-Толстой, Александр Иванович" . Brockhaus and Efron Encyclopedic Dictionary (in Russian). 1906.
