= Laurent de Gouvion Saint-Cyr =

French marshal (1764–1830)

Marshal Laurent de Gouvion Saint-Cyr Marquis of Gouvion-Saint-Cyr
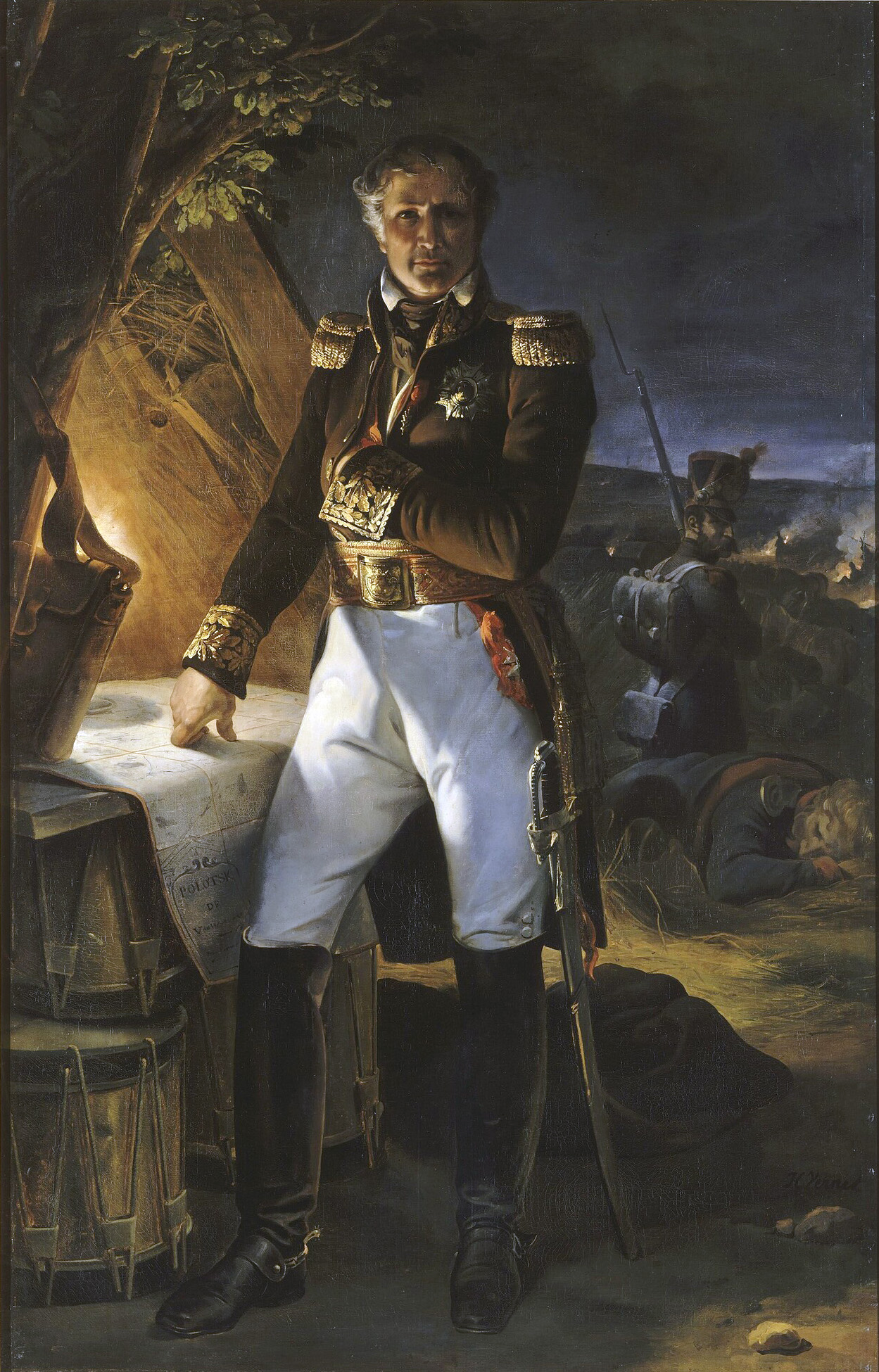
- Portrait of Marshal Saint-Cyr by Horace Vernet, 1821

Minister of War
- In office 7 July 1815 – 26 September 1815
- Preceded by: Louis-Nicolas Davout
- Succeeded by: Henri Jacques Guillaume Clarke
- In office 12 September 1817 – 19 November 1819
- Preceded by: Henri Jacques Guillaume Clarke
- Succeeded by: Victor de Fay de La Tour-Maubourg

Minister of the Navy and Colonies
- In office 23 June 1817 – 12 September 1817
- Preceded by: François Joseph de Gratet, Vicomte de Dubouchage
- Succeeded by: Louis-Mathieu Molé

Personal details
- Born: Laurent Gouvion; 13 April 1764 Toul, Three Bishoprics, Kingdom of France
- Died: 17 March 1830 (aged 65) Hyères, Var, Kingdom of France
- Awards: Grand Eagle of the Legion of Honour
- Nickname: "The Owl"

Military service
- Allegiance: France
- Branch/service: Army
- Years of service: 1792–1819
- Rank: Marshal of the Empire
- Commands: II Corps; V Corps; VI Corps; XI Corps; XIV Corps
- Battles/wars: See list: French Revolutionary Wars; War of the First Coalition; Battle of Trippstadt; Battle of Mainz; Battle of Rastatt; Battle of Ettlingen; Battle of Neresheim; Battle of Emmendingen; Battle of Biberach; Battle of Schliengen; Siege of Kehl; War of the Second Coalition; Battle of Novi; Second Battle of Novi; Third Battle of Novi; Battle of Stockach; Battle of Messkirch; Battle of Biberach; War of the Oranges; Napoleonic Wars; War of the Third Coalition; Battle of Castelfranco Veneto; Invasion of Naples; Peninsular War; Siege of Roses; Battle of Cardedeu; Battle of Molins de Rei; Battle of Valls; Third Siege of Girona; French invasion of Russia; First Battle of Polotsk; Second Battle of Polotsk; War of the Sixth Coalition; Battle of Dresden; Siege of Dresden

Laurent de Gouvion Saint-Cyr, 1st Marquis of Gouvion-Saint-Cyr (English: /ˈɡuːviɒn sæn ˈsɪər/, French: [loʁɑ̃ də ɡuvjɔ̃ sɛ̃ siʁ]; 13 April 1764 – 17 March 1830) was a French military leader of the French Revolutionary Wars and the Napoleonic Wars. He was a made a Marshal of the Empire in 1812 by Emperor Napoleon, who regarded him as his finest general in defensive warfare.

Gouvion Saint-Cyr showed an early interest in drawing, but with the onset of the French Revolution, he joined the French Revolutionary Army in September 1792 and experienced a meteoric rise through the ranks. Promoted to general of division in June 1794, he fought the Austrians in Germany and Italy under the command of generals Moreau and Jourdan.

After a period in administrative roles, Gouvion Saint-Cyr was appointed Colonel General of the cuirassiers in 1804. He served as commander-in-chief of the camp of Boulogne from 1806 to 1808 and was then sent to Spain, where he scored a series of victories at the head of the Army of Catalonia. He took command of the VI Corps of the Grande armée during the Russian campaign, where he obtained his marshal's baton for his victory at the First Battle of Polotsk. He served in the German campaign of 1813 and was taken prisoner at the capitulation of Dresden in November 1813.

Returning to France in June 1814, Gouvion Saint-Cyr played no role during the Hundred Days and became Minister of War then Minister of the Navy and Colonies under the Bourbon Restoration. His tenure was marked by several important reforms such as the law on recruitment. A talented commander, Gouvion Saint-Cyr's cold and taciturn character earned him the nickname "The Owl" (le Hibou) from his soldiers.

== Early life ==
Laurent Gouvion was born in Toul, Three Bishoprics (now Meurthe-et-Moselle), on 13 April 1764. He was the eldest child of Jean-Baptiste Gouvion, a tanner, and his wife Anne-Marie Mercier. His mother abandoned him at an early age. Gouvion went to Rome when he was eighteen in order to study painting, and continued his artistic studies after his return to Paris in 1784. He was working as a painter in Paris when the French Revolution broke out.

== Revolutionary Wars ==
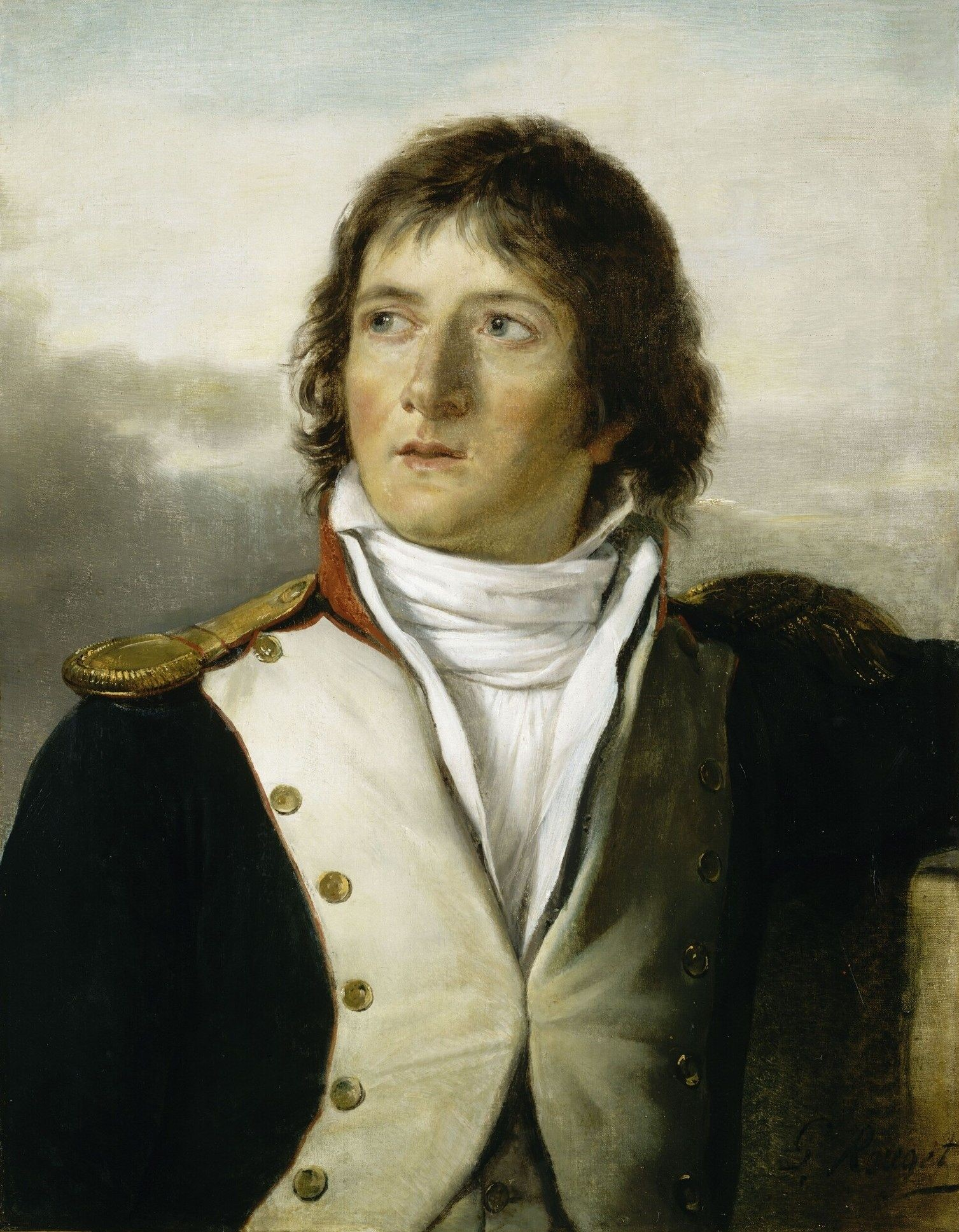
Laurent Gouvion-Saint-Cyr, captain in the 1st Battalion of Chasseurs of Paris in 1792, by Georges Rouget, 1835

On 1 September 1792, Gouvion joined the 1st Battalion of Republican Chasseurs, a Parisian volunteer unit from the Quatre-Nations section. He added his mother's name, Saint-Cyr, to his own to distinguish himself from others. Elected sub-lieutenant due to his education, Gouvion Saint-Cyr became a captain in the 9th Battalion of fédérés on 1 November, deputy to the adjutant-general of engineers Simon François Gay de Vernon on 1 February 1793, then chef de bataillon and chief of staff of General Claude François Ferey. Serving in various staffs in the Army of the Rhine, Gouvion Saint-Cyr quickly rose through the ranks: he was promoted to brigade general on 5 June 1794 and to general of division on 10 June 1794 by representative on mission Nicolas Hentz.

Gouvion Saint-Cyr commanded the French center at the Battle of Mainz (1795) under the orders of Jean-Charles Pichegru and Jean-Baptiste Kléber. In the Rhine campaign of 1796, he successfully commanded the left and then the center of the Army of the Rhine and Moselle under Moreau: he fought at the battles of Rastatt and Ettlingen, captured Stuttgart on 18 July 1796, was victorious at the Battle of Biberach on October 2, and organized the retreat of the army across the Rhine. Gouvion Saint-Cyr was entrusted with the defense of Kehl at the end of the campaign, but could not prevent the city's capitulation in January 1797.

Gouvion Saint-Cyr temporarily succeeded Lazare Hoche, who had died at the head of the Army of the Rhine and Moselle, until Charles-Pierre Augereau formally took over command. He led the invasion of the Prince-Bishopric of Basel in December 1797 and occupied it until January 1798. Gouvion Saint-Cyr, who refused to congratulate the Directory after the Coup of 18 Fructidor Year V (4 September 1797), then replaced André Masséna as commander of the Army of Rome from 26 March until 25 July 1798. He restored order and discipline and became unpopular with his soldiers. In addition, Gouvion Saint-Cyr was suspended under charges of abuse of power, which, after investigation, were revealed to be false. He returned to Germany and commanded the left wing under Jean-Baptiste Jourdan in the Army of the Danube, took part in the Battle of Stockach on 25 March 1799, then moved to the Army of Italy upon Masséna's replacement of Jourdan. Gouvion Saint-Cyr was the commander of the right wing during the defeat at the Battle of Novi, during which commander-in chief Barthélémy Catherine Joubert was killed.

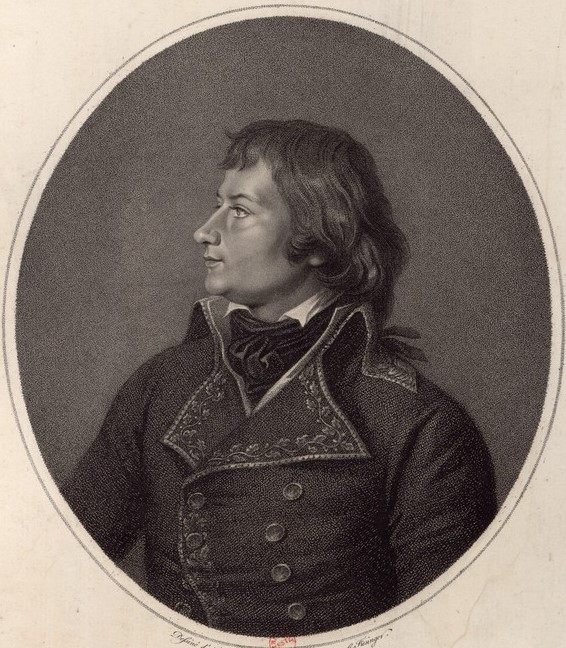
Portrait by Jean-Urbain Guérin, 1801

Unwilling to engage in politics, Gouvion Saint-Cyr refused to allow his soldiers to swear an oath to the new Consulate government, following the Coup of 18 Brumaire. However, he received from the First Consul, Napoleon Bonaparte, a sabre decorated with precious stones for his military exploits. He returned to the Army of the Rhine as Moreau's deputy in late 1799. Gouvion Saint-Cyr was received with enthusiasm by the soldiers, and led them to victory at the Battle of Biberach on 9 May 1800. He was not, however, on good terms with his commander and retired to France after the first operations of the campaign.

Gouvion Saint-Cyr was granted leave by Bonaparte and was appointed State Councillor in the war section. Stendhal, then Gouvion Saint-Cyr's secretary, described him as "one of the rare military leaders who were capable of studying a dossier". Gouvion Saint-Cyr was tasked with commanding the Franco-Spanish armies during the War of the Oranges in 1801. When a peace treaty was shortly afterwards concluded with Portugal, he succeeded Lucien Bonaparte as ambassador at Madrid. Gouvion Saint-Cyr experienced certain difficulties in this assignment, being more of a soldier than a diplomat. Recalled to Paris in August 1802, he was sent to Italy on 14 May 1803, as lieutenant general of the corps of observation of Naples under the command of Joachim Murat.

== Napoleonic Wars ==
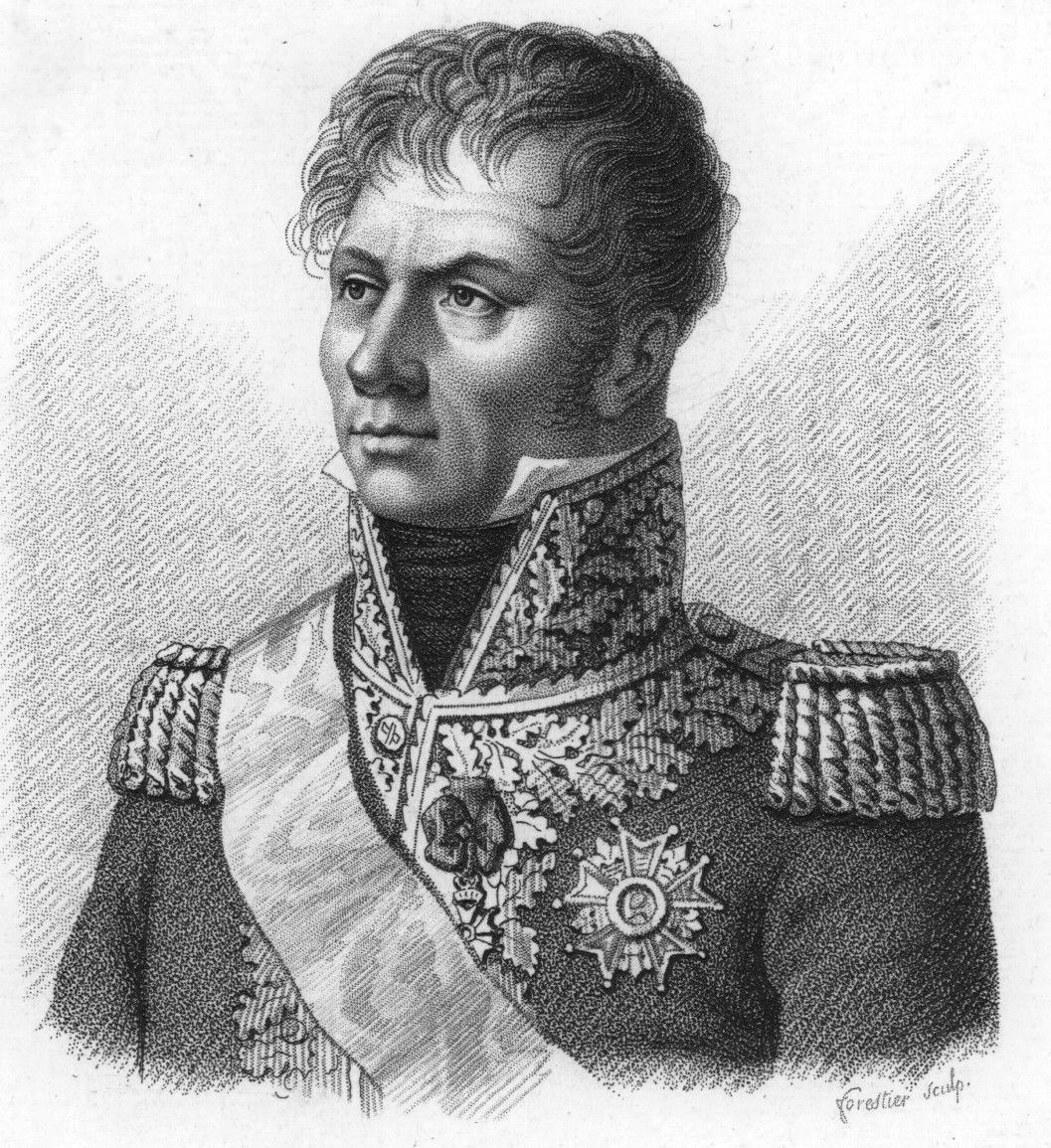
Portrait by Charles-Aimé Forestier

Gouvion Saint-Cyr was a stoic in an age of pragmatism and glory. His refusal to sign the proclamation of congratulation for declaring the birth of the Empire resulted in his name not being included in the first list of Napoleonic marshals, while commanders such as Jean Lannes, Jean-Baptiste Bessières and Jean-de-Dieu Soult who had not had independent command experience were included. Nevertheless, he was named Colonel General of the cuirassiers on 6 July 1804 and a Grand Eagle of the Legion of Honour on 2 February 1805. Still posted to Italy, Gouvion Saint-Cyr was present at Napoleon's coronation as King of Italy in Milan in May 1805. During the War of the Third Coalition, as commander the left wing of Masséna's army, he defeated and captured the émigré Louis Victor Meriadec de Rohan-Guéméné at the Battle of Castelfranco Veneto on 29 November 1805. Placed at the head of the Army of Naples in December, he was succeeded a month later by Masséna but left his post before the latter's arrival. When he returned to Paris to protest his treatment in Naples, the emperor sent him back to his post on pain of death.

On his return and from February to August 1806, Gouvion Saint-Cyr commanded an army corps deployed to Apulia and Abruzzi. He wrote to Berthier, "I have endured all the disgusts of this mission". He was then in command of the camp of Boulogne from December 1806 to August 1808, a secondary role while his future marshal colleagues covered themselves with glory in the War of the Fourth Coalition. He took advantage of this time to acquire the Reverseaux estate in the commune of Rouvray-Saint-Florentin, in Eure-et-Loir. He was made a Count of the Empire in May 1808 and was sent to Catalonia in August.

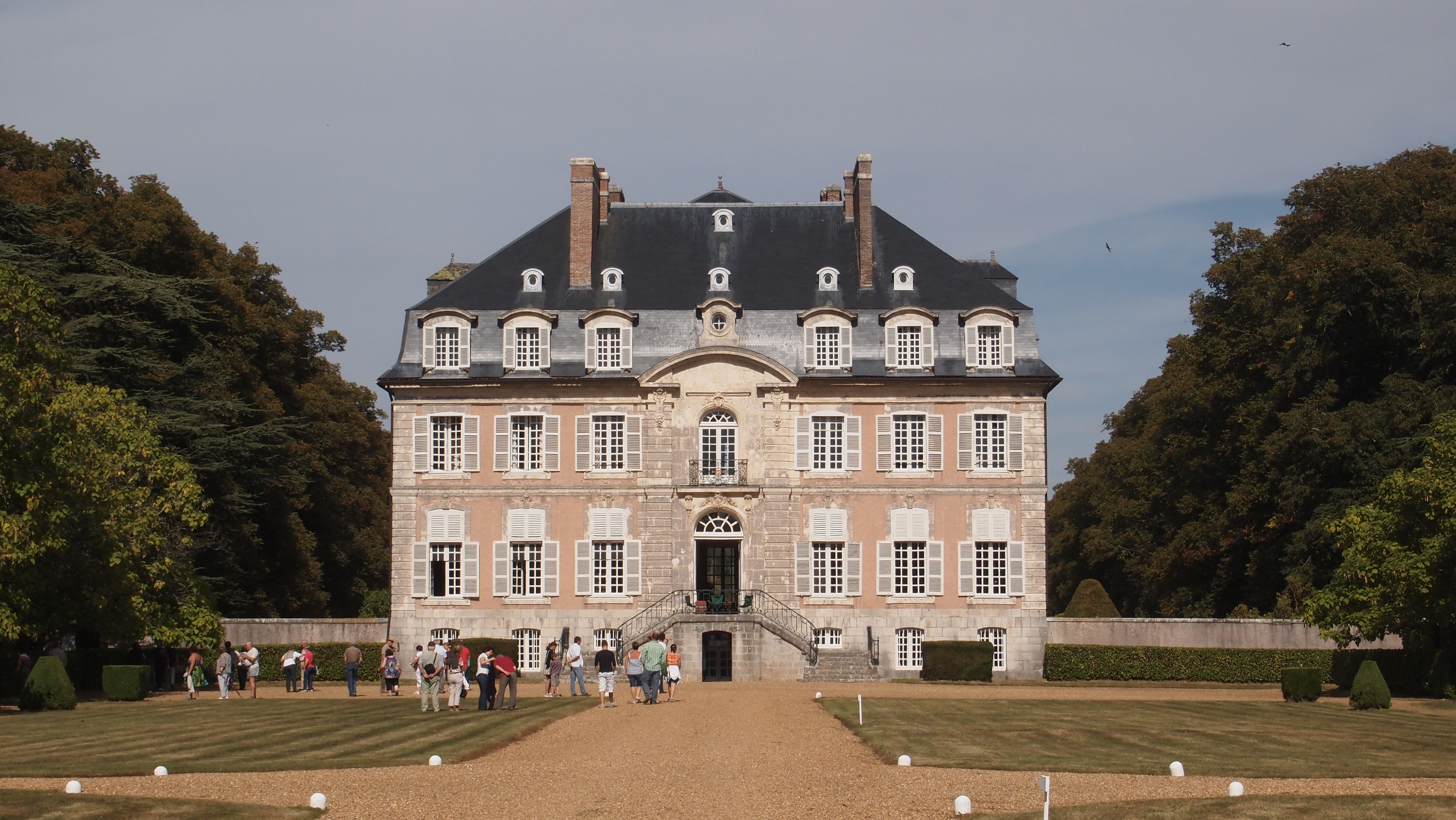
The Château de Reverseaux at Rouvray-Saint-Florentin, Eure-et-Loir

A remarkable tactician, Gouvion Saint-Cyr, at the head of the V Corps, was victorious in several battles, notably at Cardedeu on 16 December, Molins de Rei on 20 December, and Valls on 25 February 1809. He led the successful Siege of Roses and lifted the blockade of Barcelona. Having refused to carry out Berthier's order to simultaneously besiege Girona, Tarragona and Tortosa, he was replaced by Augereau and left his post before the latter's arrival. Arrested and returned to his estate, Gouvion Saint-Cyr remained on the sidelines until 1811, when he was reinstated in the Council of State. At the start of the Russian campaign, Gouvion Saint-Cyr received command of the VI Corps, and on 18 August 1812 defeated the Russians under Wittgenstein at the First Battle of Polotsk, in recognition of which he was made a Marshal of the Empire. The Russians, under Barclay de Tolly, were burning everything as they retreated towards Moscow, and had just burned nearby Smolensk. It was just before the victory at Polotsk on the banks of the Daugava river, however, that Marshal Nicolas Oudinot was wounded, and thus the II Corps was added to Gouvion Saint-Cyr's sphere of command.

On 18 October, Gouvion Saint-Cyr again faced Wittgenstein at the Second Battle of Polotsk, but had to retreat after two days of particularly bloody fighting, in which the marshal himself received a severe bullet wound to the foot. During the German campaign of 1813, he commanded the XI Corps of Berlin in February but, suffering from typhus, he returned to France for treatment. As commander-in-chief of the XIV Corps of Army of Germany, Saint-Cyr distinguished himself at the Battle of Dresden (26–27 August 1813) and in the city's defence against the Allies, capitulating only on 11 November, when Napoleon had retreated to the Rhine after the Battle of Leipzig. He became an Austrian prisoner of war, and was thus the only of Napoleon's marshals to have been taken prisoner during the Napoleonic Wars. At the time, Napoleon commented, "The Allies have violated the rights of man, not in order to deprive me of 20,000 to 25,000 soldiers, but to make Saint Cyr prisoner. He is the first of us all in defensive warfare".

== Hundred Days and Bourbon Restoration ==
After his return from captivity in June 1814, Gouvion Saint-Cyr retired to his estate and was made a Peer of France on 4 June by King Louis XVIII. In 1815, he rallied neither to Napoleon during the Hundred Days nor to Louis XVIII's Ghent government in exile. On the king's return, Gouvion Saint-Cyr was appointed Minister of War in the Talleyrand ministry, serving from 8 July to 25 September 1815. In this capacity, he tried to assist long-time friend and fellow marshal Michel Ney by providing him a jury of four other Napoleonic marshals, but was disgraced when Marshal Moncey refused to even sit in it. Gouvion Saint-Cyr voted for Ney's deportation at his trial before the Chamber of Peers.

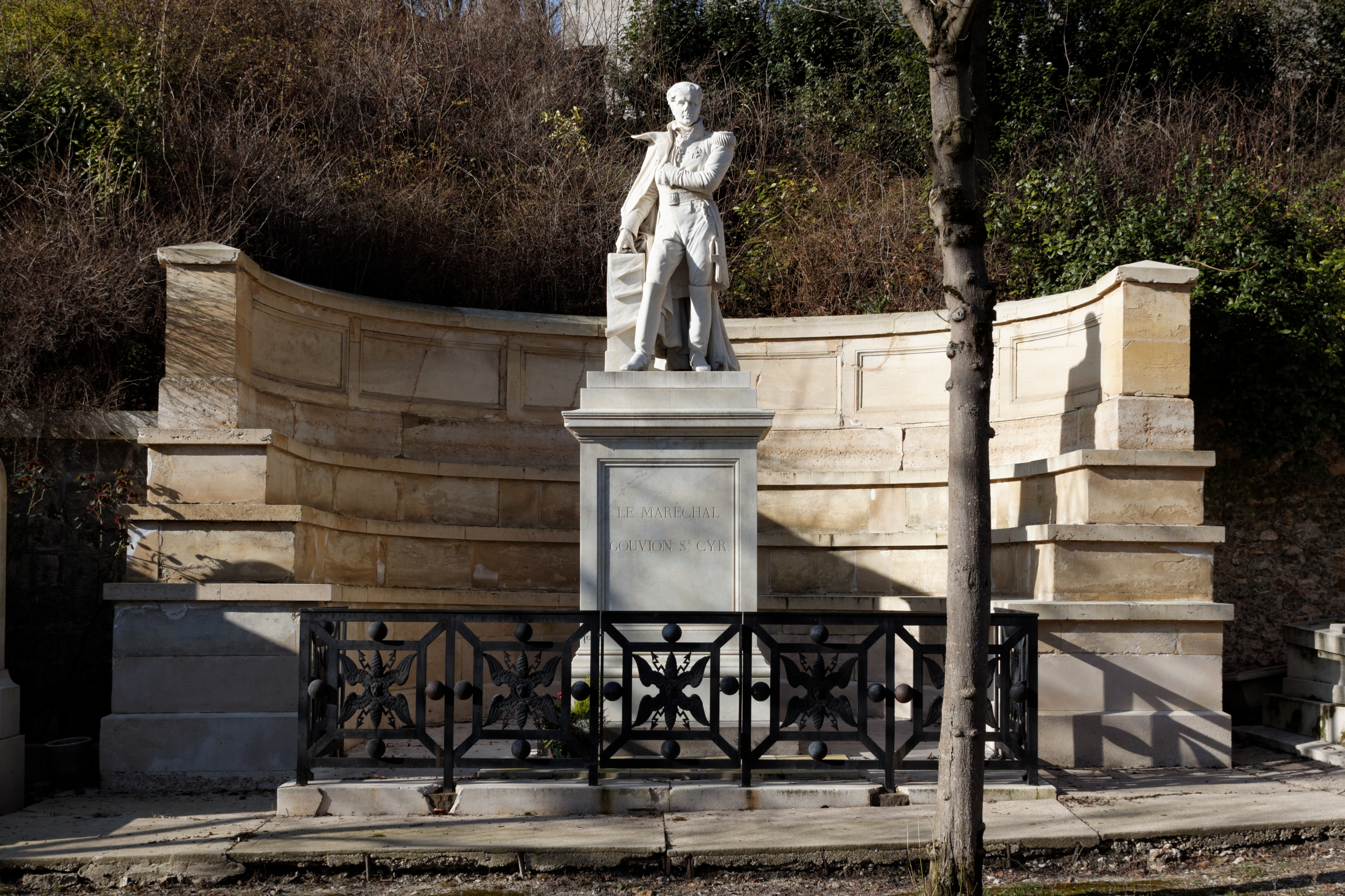
Gouvion Saint-Cyr's tomb at Père Lachaise Cemetery, Paris

In June 1817, Gouvion Saint-Cyr was appointed Minister of the Navy and Colonies, a pretext for him to resume the office of War Minister, which he did from 12 September 1817 until 18 November 1819. During this time he initiated many reforms, particularly in respect of measures tending to make the army a national rather than a dynastic force. He made efforts to safeguard the rights of veteran soldiers of the Empire, organized the General Staff, revised the code of military law and the pension regulations and, most notably, passed the Gouvion-Saint-Cyr Law on 10 March 1818, which organized recruitment and re-established the Revolution's policy of conscription. He was made a marquess in 1817. Gouvion Saint-Cyr retired to the countryside and devoted his final years to agriculture and the writing of his memoirs. He died on 17 March 1830 in Hyères, a town in the southeast of France, and was buried in the Père Lachaise Cemetery. The name GOUVION S^{T} CYR is engraved on the Arc de Triomphe in Paris.

== Marriage and issue ==
Gouvion Saint-Cyr married Anne Gouvion (Toul, 2 November 1775 – Paris, 18 June 1844), his first cousin, on 26 February 1795. Their only child, Laurent-François de Gouvion-Saint-Cyr (30 December 1815 – 30 January 1904), married Marie Adélaïde Bachasson de Montalivet (5 November 1828 – 14 April 1880), daughter of Marthe Camille Bachasson, Count of Montalivet, in Saint-Bouize on 17 August 1847, and had issue.

== In literature ==
Marshal Saint-Cyr is mentioned in Joseph Conrad's short story "The Duel" (as well as Ridley Scott's film adaptation The Duellists) as the commander of Armand d'Hubert after the second and final restoration of Louis XVIII as King of France. He is also mentioned in Stendhal's The Red and the Black.

== Writings ==
- Journal des opérations de l'armée de Catalogne en 1808 et 1809 (Paris, 1821)
- Mémoires sur les campagnes des armées de Rhin et de Rhin-et-Moselle de 1794 à 1797 (Paris, 1829)
- Mémoires pour servir de l'histoire militaire sous le Directoire, le Consulat et l'Empire (1831)

== Citations ==
Political offices
Preceded by Louis Nicolas Davout	Minister of War; 7 July 1815 – 26 September 1815	Succeeded by Henri Jacques Guillaume Clarke
Preceded by Henri Jacques Guillaume Clarke	Minister of War; 12 September 1817 – 19 November 1819	Succeeded by Marie Victor Nicolas de Fay, marquis de La Tour-Maubourg
Preceded by François Joseph de Gratet, vicomte Dubouchage	Ministers of Marine and Colonies; 23 June 1817 – 12 September 1817	Succeeded by Louis-Mathieu Molé
