= List of Napoleonic Wars films =

Below is an incomplete list of feature films, television films or television series which include events of the Napoleonic Wars. This list does not include documentaries, short films. This list of movies is not a list of Napoleon movies. This includes films about Napoleon's life after ≈1799. About Napoleon's life before ≈1799, see the List of films set during the French Revolution and French Revolutionary Wars.

== 1910s ==
Year	Country	Main title (Alternative title)	Original title (Original script)	Director	Subject
1912	Russian Empire	1812	1812 год	Vasili Goncharov; Kai Hansen; Aleksandr Uralsky	Drama, History. French invasion of Russia
1912	German Empire		Theodor Körner	Franz Porten; Gerhard Dammann	Biography, Drama. Theodor Körner
1913	Italy	The Two Sergeants	I due sergenti	Eugenio Perego	Drama. Based on the play The Two Sergeants
1913	Austria-Hungary		Speckbacher	Pierre Paul Gilmans	Josef Speckbacher, Andreas Hofer, Tyrolean Rebellion
1913	United Kingdom	The Battle of Waterloo		Charles Weston	Dramatisation of the Battle of Waterloo
1914	France; Poland	Countess Walewska	Bóg wojny	Aleksander Hertz	Marie Walewska
1914	German Empire	Colonel Chabert	Oberst Chabert	Rudolf Meinert	Drama. Based on a novel Colonel Chabert
1914	Italy	Napoleon's Hundred Days	I cento giorni di Napoleone	Roberto Danesi; Archita Valente	Hundred Days
1914	German Empire	Tyrol in arms	Tirol in Waffen	Carl Froelich	Drama, War. Andreas Hofer, Tyrolean Rebellion
1914	German Empire		Bergnacht	Curt A. Stark	Drama, Romance. Tyrolean Rebellion
1915	Russian Empire	Natasza Rostowa	Наташа Ростова	Pyotr Chardynin	Based on a novel War and Peace. War of the Third Coalition, French invasion of Russia
1915	United States	Vanity Fair		Eugene Nowland; Charles Brabin	Drama. Based on a novel Vanity Fair.
1915	Austria-Hungary	The war godchild	Das Kriegspatenkind	Emil Leyde	Drama. Landsturm
1915	German Empire	The catwalk	Der Katzensteg	Max Mack	Based on a novel The Cats' Bridge.
1915	United Kingdom	Brigadier Gerard		Bert Haldane	Drama, History. Based on the Brigadier Gerard stories
1915	Russian Empire	War and Peace	Война и мир	Vladimir Gardin	Drama, History. Based on a novel War and Peace. War of the Third Coalition, French invasion of Russia
1917	Sweden	A Man There Was	Terje Vigen	Victor Sjöström	Drama, War. Based on a poem Terje Vigen
1917	German Empire	Skull Rider	Totenkopfreiter	Otto Lins-Morstadt	History.
1917	German Empire	East Prussia and its Hindenburg	Ostpreußen und sein Hindenburg	Gustav Trautschold; Richard Schott	Drama, War.
1918	Poland	Prince Józef Poniatowski	Książę Józef Poniatowski	Aleksander Hertz	
1918	United Kingdom	Nelson		Maurice Elvey	Biography, Drama, Romance, War. Horatio Nelson
1919	United Kingdom	The Romance of Lady Hamilton		Bert Haldane	Drama, History. Horatio Nelson, Lady Hamilton

== 1920s ==
Year	Country	Main title (Alternative title)	Original title (Original script)	Director	Subject
1920	Weimar Republic	Madame Récamier		Joseph Delmont	Juliette Récamier
1920	Italy	Colonel Chabert	Il colonello Chabert	Carmine Gallone	Drama. Based on a novel Colonel Chabert
1920	Weimar Republic	Napoleon and the Little Washerwoman	Napoleon und die kleine Wäscherin	Adolf Gärtner	Comedy. Based on the play Madame Sans-Gêne. Catherine Hübscher
1920	Weimar Republic	Countess Walewska	Gräfin Walewska	Otto Rippert	History. Marie Walewska
1920	Weimar Republic	Colonel Chabert	Oberst Chabert	Eugen Burg	Drama. Based on a novel Colonel Chabert
1920	Weimar Republic	Johann Baptiste Lingg		Arthur Teuber	Johann Baptist Lingg von Linggenfeld
1921	Weimar Republic	The Bull of Olivera	Der Stier von Olivera	Erich Schönfelder	Peninsular War
1921	France	Uncle Bernac	Un drame sous Napoléon	Gérard Bourgeois	Drama. Based on a novel Uncle Bernac.
1921	Weimar Republic	Lady Hamilton		Richard Oswald	Drama, History. Based on the novels Liebe und Leben der Lady Hamilton and Lord Nelsons letzte Liebe. Horatio Nelson, Lady Hamilton
1922	Italy	The Two Sergeants	I due sergenti	Guido Brignone	Based on the play The Two Sergeants
1922	Austria	The Marquis of Bolibar	Der Marquis von Bolibar	Friedrich Porges	Based on a novel Der Marquis von Bolibar
1923	Weimar Republic	The Little Napoleon	Der kleine Napoleon	Georg Jacoby	Biography, Drama.
1923	United States	Vanity Fair		Hugo Ballin	Drama. Based on a novel Vanity Fair
1923	Austria	Young Medardus	Der junge Medardus	Michael Curtiz	History. Based on the play Young Medardus
1923	United Kingdom	A Royal Divorce		Alexander Butler	Drama, History. Based on the play A Royal Divorce.
1924	United Kingdom	Napoleon and Josephine		Alexander Butler	Biography, Drama.
1924	Italy		Fra Diavolo	Emilio Zeppieri	
1925	Italy		Fra Diavolo	Mario Gargiulo; Roberto Roberti	
1925	Weimar Republic	What the Stones Tell	Was Steine erzählen	Rolf Randolf	Lützow Free Corps
1925	Weimar Republic; France	Zigano		Gérard Bourgeois; Harry Piel	
1925	United States	Madame Sans-Gêne		Léonce Perret	Comedy. Based on the play Madame Sans-Gêne. Catherine Hübscher
1926	Weimar Republic	The Eleven Schill Officers	Die elf Schill'schen Offiziere	Rudolf Meinert	History. Ferdinand von Schill, Battle of Stralsund
1926	United Kingdom	Nelson		Walter Summers	Biography, Drama, Romance, War. Horatio Nelson
1927	United States	Quality Street		Sidney Franklin	Comedy, Drama, Music, Romance. Based on the play Quality Street
1927	Weimar Republic; Switzerland	Petronella	Petronella - Das Geheimnis der Berge	Hanns Schwarz	Drama.
1927	Weimar Republic	Lützow's Wild Hunt	Lützows wilde verwegene Jagd	Richard Oswald	Ludwig Adolf Wilhelm von Lützow, Lützow Free Corps
1927	Weimar Republic	The Catwalk	Der Katzensteg	Gerhard Lamprecht	History. Based on a novel The Cats' Bridge
1927	Weimar Republic	Prinz Louis Ferdinand		Hans Behrendt	Drama. Louis Ferdinand
1927	United States	The Fighting Eagle		Donald Crisp	Romance, Drama. Based on a novel The Exploits of Brigadier Gerard.
1927	Spain	The second of May	El dos de mayo	José Buchs; Fernando Roldán	Drama, History. Dos de Mayo Uprising, Peninsular War, Francisco Goya
1927-8	Weimar Republic	Queen Louise	Königin Luise	Karl Grune	Drama, History. Louise of Mecklenburg-Strelitz
1928	France	Madame Récamier		Tony Lekain; Gaston Ravel	Biography, Drama, History. Juliette Récamier
1928	Weimar Republic	The Prince of Rogues	Schinderhannes	Curtis Bernhardt	Based on the play Schinderhannes. Schinderhannes
1928	Poland	Pan Tadeusz		Ryszard Ordyński	Drama, History, Romance. Based on a poem Pan Tadeusz.
1928	United Kingdom	Bolibar		Walter Summers	Drama, War. Based on a novel The Marquis of Bolibar.
1929	United States	Devil-May-Care		Sidney Franklin	Music, Romance, War. Based on the play La Bataille de dames, ou un duel en amour.
1929	Weimar Republic	Waterloo		Karl Grune	Drama, History, War. Battle of Waterloo
1929	Weimar Republic	Andreas Hofer		Hans Prechtl	Adventure, History. Andreas Hofer, Tyrolean Rebellion
1929	Spain	Agustina of Aragon	Agustina de Aragón	Florián Rey	Agustina de Aragón, Peninsular War
1929	United States	The Divine Lady		Frank Lloyd	Drama, History, Romance, War. Based on a novel The Divine Lady: A Romance of Nelson and Emma Hamilton. Horatio Nelson, Lady Hamilton
1929	United States	Eternal Love		Ernst Lubitsch	Drama, Romance. Based on a novel Der Koenig der Bernina.
1929	Weimar Republic	Roses Bloom on the Moorland	Rosen blühen auf dem Heidegrab	Kurt Blachy	History, War.
1929	Weimar Republic	Diane	Diane – Die Geschichte einer Pariserin	Erich Waschneck	French invasion of Russia

== 1930s ==
Year	Country	Main title (Alternative title)	Original title (Original script)	Director	Subject
1930	Weimar Republic	The Last Company	Die letzte Kompagnie	Curtis Bernhardt	Drama. Battle of Jena–Auerstedt
1931	France		Fra Diavolo	Mario Bonnard	Adventure. Fra Diavolo
1931	Weimar Republic	The Congress Dances	Der Kongreß tanzt	Erik Charell	Comedy, History, Musical. Congress of Vienna
1931	Weimar Republic	Louise, Queen of Prussia	Luise, Königin von Preußen	Carl Froelich	Drama. Louise of Mecklenburg-Strelitz
1931	Weimar Republic	Yorck		Gustav Ucicky	Biography, Drama, War. Ludwig Yorck von Wartenburg
1932	Weimar Republic		Theodor Körner	Carl Boese	Drama. Theodor Körner, Lützow Free Corps
1932	Weimar Republic	Marshal Forwards	Marschall Vorwärts	Heinz Paul	Gebhard Leberecht von Blücher
1932	Weimar Republic	The Rebel	Der Rebell	Curtis Bernhardt; Edwin H. Knopf; Luis Trenker	Drama. Andreas Hofer, Tyrolean Rebellion
1932	Weimar Republic	The Eleven Schill Officers	Die elf Schill’schen Offiziere	Rudolf Meinert	Ferdinand von Schill, Battle of Stralsund
1932	Weimar Republic	The Black Hussar	Der schwarze Husar	Gerhard Lamprecht	Comedy, Drama. Freikorps, Black Brunswickers, Frederick William
1933	Nazi Germany	The Judas of Tyrol	Der Judas von Tirol	Franz Osten	Drama. Andreas Hofer, Tyrolean Rebellion
1934	Nazi Germany	So Ended a Great Love	So endete eine Liebe	Karl Hartl	Romance.
1934	United States	The House of Rothschild		Alfred L. Werker; Maude T. Howell	Biography, Drama, History, War. Based on the play Rothschild. Rothschild family
1934	Nazi Germany	Black Hunter Johanna	Schwarzer Jäger Johanna	Johannes Meyer	Drama. Based on a novel Schwarzer Jäger Johanna. Frederick William, Black Brunswickers, Battle of Ölper
1934	United Kingdom	The Iron Duke		Victor Saville	Biography, Drama. Arthur Wellesley, Hundred Days
1935	United Kingdom	Invitation to the Waltz		Paul Merzbach	Musical. Based on the play Invitation to the Waltz.
1935	Italy	May field	Campo di maggio	Giovacchino Forzano	Biography, Drama, History. Based on the play Campo di maggio. Hundred Days
1935	United States	Becky Sharp		Rouben Mamoulian	Drama, Romance, War. Based on a novel Vanity Fair
1935	Italy; Nazi Germany	Hundred Days	Hundert Tage	Franz Wenzler	Drama. Hundred Days
1935	Nazi Germany	The Higher Command	Der höhere Befehl	Gerhard Lamprecht	Drama.
1935	United Kingdom	Midshipman Easy		Carol Reed	Adventure. Based on a novel Mr Midshipman Easy.
1936	Italy	The Two Sergeants	I due sergenti	Enrico Guazzoni	Drama. Based on the play The Two Sergeants
1936	United States	Hearts Divided		Frank Borzage	Drama, Romance. Based on the play Glorious Betsy.
1936	United States	Lloyd's of London		Henry King	Drama, History, Romance, War. Lloyd's of London
1937	Nazi Germany	The catwalk	Der Katzensteg	Fritz Peter Buch	Drama. Based on a novel The Cats' Bridge
1937	Poland	Prince Joseph's Lancer	Ułan Księcia Józefa	Konrad Tom	Romance, War.
1937	United States	Quality Street		George Stevens	Comedy, Drama, Romance. Based on the play Quality Street.
1937	United States	Conquest		Clarence Brown; Gustav Machatý	Drama, History, Music, Mystery, Romance. Marie Walewska
1937	United States	The Firefly		Robert Z. Leonard	History, Musical, Romance.
1938	Italy	The bride of kings	La sposa dei Re	Duilio Coletti	Comedy, History. Based on the play La sposa dei re. Désirée Clary
1938	United Kingdom	A Royal Divorce		Jack Raymond	Drama, History.
1939	Nazi Germany	Wibbel the Tailor	Schneider Wibbel	Viktor de Kowa	Comedy. Based on the play Wibbel the Tailor.

== 1940s ==
Year	Country	Main title (Alternative title)	Original title (Original script)	Director	Subject
1940	Nazi Germany	The Rothschilds	Die Rothschilds	Erich Waschneck	Biography, Drama. Rothschild family
1940	Nazi Germany	The Fire Devil	Der Feuerteufel	Luis Trenker	Action, War. Tyrolean Rebellion
1941	United Kingdom	This England		David MacDonald	Drama, History, Romance, War.
1941	Hungary	Háry János		Frigyes Bán	Based on folk opera Háry János.
1941	France	Madame Sans-Gêne		Roger Richebé	Comedy, Drama, History. Based on the play Madame Sans-Gêne. Catherine Hübscher
1941	United States	That Hamilton Woman		Alexander Korda	Drama, History, Romance, War. Lady Hamilton, William Hamilton, Horatio Nelson
1941	Nazi Germany	Comrades	Kameraden	Hans Schweikart	Drama, History.
1942	Sweden	General von Döbeln		Olof Molander	Drama, History, War. Georg Carl von Döbeln
1942	Nazi Germany; Austria	Vienna Blood	Wiener Blut	Willi Forst	Comedy, Music. Based on an operetta Wiener Blut. Congress of Vienna
1942	United Kingdom	The Young Mr. Pitt		Carol Reed	Biography, Drama, Romance, War. William Pitt the Younger
1942	France	The Fabulous Destiny of Désirée Clary	Le Destin fabuleux de Désirée Clary	Sacha Guitry; René Le Hénaff	Comedy, Drama, History. Désirée Clary
1942	Italy	The Adventures of Fra Diavolo	Fra' Diavolo	Luigi Zampa	Drama. Fra Diavolo
1943	United States	Forever and a Day		René Clair; Edmund Goulding; Cedric Hardwicke; Frank Lloyd; Victor Saville; Robert Stevenson; Herbert Wilcox	Drama, History.
1943	France	Colonel Chabert	Le colonel Chabert	René Le Hénaff	Drama. Based on a novel Colonel Chabert
1943	Spain	The standard bearer	El abanderado	Eusebio Fernández Ardavín	History. Luis Daoíz y Torres, Pedro Velarde y Santillán, Dos de Mayo Uprising, Peninsular War
1943	Soviet Union	Kutuzov	Кутузов	Vladimir Petrov	Drama. Mikhail Kutuzov, French invasion of Russia
1945	Nazi Germany	Kolberg		Veit Harlan	Drama, History, Romance, War. Based on the play Colberg and autobiography of Joachim Nettelbeck. Siege of Kolberg (1807)
1945	Argentina	Madame Sans-Gêne		Luis César Amadori	Comedy. Based on the play Madame Sans-Gêne. Catherine Hübscher
1947	Soviet Union	Vintage vaudeville	Старинный водевиль	Igor Savchenko	Comedy, History, Musical. Based on vaudeville Az and Firth, or Wedding with monograms. French invasion of Russia
1948	France	Colonel Durand	Le colonel Durand	René Chanas	Drama. Based on a novel Le colonel Durand.
1948	France; Italy	The Charterhouse of Parma	La Chartreuse de Parme; La Certosa di Parma	Christian-Jaque	Drama, Romance. Based on a novel The Charterhouse of Parma.
1948	Spain	The Drummer of Bruch	El tambor del Bruch	Ignacio F. Iquino	Drummer of El Bruc, Battles of El Bruch, Peninsular War
1949	Spain	Adventures of Juan Lucas	Aventuras de Juan Lucas	Rafael Gil	Adventure. Based on a novel Aventuras de Juan Lucas. Peninsular War
1949	United States	The Secret of St. Ives		Phil Rosen	Action, Adventure, History, Romance, War. Based on a novel St. Ives.

== 1950s ==
Year	Country	Main title (Alternative title)	Original title (Original script)	Director	Subject
1950	Spain	Blood in castile	Sangre en Castilla	Benito Perojo	Drama. Peninsular War
1950	Italy; France	Women and Brigands	Donne e briganti	Mario Soldati	Adventure, Drama. Fra Diavolo
1950	Spain	Agustina of Aragon	Agustina de Aragón	Juan de Orduña	Drama, History, War. Agustina de Aragón, Peninsular War
1950	United Kingdom	The Reluctant Widow		Bernard Knowles	Drama. Based on a novel The Reluctant Widow.
1950	United States	Tyrant of the Sea		Lew Landers	Adventure, War.
1951	Italy	The Two Sergeants	I Due sergenti	Carlo Alberto Chiesa	Comedy. Based on the play The Two Sergeants
1951	Italy	Napoleon	Napoleone	Carlo Borghesio	Comedy. Napoleon
1951	Spain	The King's Mail	Correo del rey	Ricardo Gascón	Adventure, History.
1951	United Kingdom; United States; France	Captain Horatio Hornblower		Raoul Walsh	Action, Adventure, Drama, War. Based on a C. S. Forester novels.
1952	United States	The Brigand		Phil Karlson	Adventure, Romance. Based on a novel The Brigand.
1952	Spain	Lola the Coalgirl	Lola, la piconera	Luis Lucia	Drama. Based on the play Cuando las Cortes de Cádiz. Siege of Cádiz, Peninsular War
1953	Austria	The Last Reserves	Das letzte Aufgebot	Alfred Lehner	Biography, Drama, History. Andreas Hofer, Tyrolean Rebellion
1953	Austria	Daughter of the Regiment	Die Regimentstochter	Georg C. Klaren	Drama, Romance. Based on an opera La fille du régiment.
1954	United States	Désirée		Henry Koster	Biography, Drama, History, Romance. Based on a novel Désirée. Désirée Clary
1954	Spain		El mensaje	Fernando Fernán Gómez	Drama. Peninsular War
1955	Austria	The Congress Dances	Der Kongreß tanzt	Franz Antel	Comedy, Romance, Music. Congress of Vienna
1955	France	Caroline and the Rebels	Le Fils de Caroline chérie	Jean Devaivre	Adventure, History. Peninsular War
1955	United States	The Purple Mask		H. Bruce Humberstone	Adventure, History.
1955	France; Italy	Napoléon		Sacha Guitry	Biography, Drama, War. Napoleon
1956	Italy; United States	War and Peace	Guerra e pace	King Vidor	Drama, Romance, War. Based on a novel War and Peace. War of the Third Coalition, French invasion of Russia
1957	West Germany	Queen Louise	Königin Luise	Wolfgang Liebeneiner	Drama. Louise of Mecklenburg-Strelitz
1957	Austria; Switzerland	The King of Bernina	Der König der Bernina	Alfred Lehner	Drama. Based on a novel Der Koenig der Bernina.
1957	United States	The Pride and the Passion		Stanley Kramer	Action, Adventure, Drama, Romance, War. Peninsular War
1957	Spain		Sueños de historia	José H. Gan	Siege of Zaragoza (1808), Peninsular War
1958	Finland	Sven Tuuva the Hero	Sven Tuuva	Edvin Laine	Adventure, Drama. Based on the poem "Sven Dufva" which is part of The Tales of Ensign Stål, written by Johan Ludvig Runeberg, the national poet of Finland..
1958	Italy; France; United States	The Naked Maja		Henry Koster	Adventure, Biography, Drama, Romance. Francisco Goya, María Cayetana de Silva
1958	West Germany		Der Schinderhannes	Helmut Käutner	Crime, Drama, History, Romance. Based on the play Schinderhannes. Schinderhannes
1958	France; Italy	If the king knew that	Si le roi savait ça Al servizio dell'imperatore	Caro Canaille; Edoardo Anton	Comedy, Drama. Based on a novel Le Trompette de la Bérésina.
1959	Spain; Italy; France	The French arrived	Llegaron los franceses	León Klimovsky	Dos de Mayo Uprising, Peninsular War
1959	Sweden; Poland; Finland	Wedding night	Noc poslubna	Erik Blomberg	Drama, History, Romance. Based on a story Attaque du Moulin.
1959	Spain	A Girl Against Napoleon	Carmen, la de Ronda	Tulio Demicheli	Drama. Based on a novel Carmen. Peninsular War
1959	Spain	Sale of Vargas	Venta de Vargas	Enrique Cahen Salaberry	Adventure, Musical. Peninsular War
1959	United States	The Miracle		Irving Rapper	Drama, Music, Romance. Peninsular War
1959	West Germany; France	The beautiful liar	Die schöne Lügnerin	Axel von Ambesser	Comedy. Congress of Vienna

== 1960s ==
Year	Country	Main title (Alternative title)	Original title (Original script)	Director	Subject
1960	Italy; France	Three Etc.'s and the Colonel	Le tre "eccetera" del colonnello	Claude Boissol	Comedy. Peninsular War
1960	France; Italy; Yugoslavia; Liechtenstein	Austerlitz		Abel Gance	Drama, History, War. Napoleon, Battle of Austerlitz
1961	Italy; France; Spain	Madame	Madame Sans-Gêne	Christian-Jaque	Comedy, Drama, Romance, War. Based on the play Madame Sans-Gêne. Catherine Hübscher
1962	United Kingdom	The Piper's Tune		Muriel Box	Drama, Family.
1962	Italy	The legend of Fra Diavolo	La leggenda di Fra Diavolo	Leopoldo Savona	Action, Adventure, Drama. Fra Diavolo
1962	Italy; Spain	Fra' Diavolo's trombones	I tromboni di Fra' Diavolo	Giorgio Simonelli	Adventure, Comedy. Fra Diavolo
1962	France; Italy	Imperial Venus	Vénus impériale Venere Imperiale	Jean Delannoy	Drama, History, Romance. Pauline Bonaparte
1962	Soviet Union	Hussar Ballad	Гусарская баллада	Eldar Ryazanov	Comedy, Musical, War. Based on the play A Long Time Ago. Nadezhda Durova, French invasion of Russia
1963	Spain	The guerrillas	Los Guerrilleros	Pedro Luis Ramírez	Drama, History. Peninsular War
1964	Italy	The last charge	L'ultima carica	Leopoldo Savona	Adventure, History.
1964	United Kingdom	Carry On Jack		Gerald Thomas	Adventure, Comedy, Romance.
1965	Poland	The Ashes	Popioły	Andrzej Wajda	Drama, History, War. Based on a novel Popioły
1965	Hungary	Háry János		Miklós Szinetár	Comedy, Musical. Based on folk opera Háry János.
1966	West Germany; Austria; France	Congress of Love	Der Kongreß amüsiert sich Le Congrès s'amuse	Géza von Radványi	Comedy, Romance. Congress of Vienna
1966	Poland	Maria and Napoleon	Marysia i Napoleon	Leonard Buczkowski	Comedy, History, Romance. Marie Walewska
1966	Spain; Italy; France	The Sea Pirate	Surcouf, le tigre des sept mers Surcouf, l'eroe dei sette mari El tigre de los siete mares	Sergio Bergonzelli; Roy Rowland	Adventure. Robert Surcouf
1967	West Germany; Italy	A Handful of Heroes	Eine Handvoll Helden	Fritz Umgelter	Drama, War. Battle of Jena–Auerstedt
1968	France; Austria; West Germany; Hungary; Italy	Sexy Susan Sins Again	Frau Wirtin hat auch einen Grafen; Susanna... ed i suoi dolci vizi alla corte del re	Franz Antel	Adventure, Comedy, Drama.
1968	East Germany	Captain Florian from the Mill	Hauptmann Florian von der Mühle	Werner W. Wallroth	Comedy. Based on a novel Die Winternachtsabenteuer.
1968	Italy; West Germany; France; United States	Emma Hamilton		Christian-Jaque	Drama, History, Romance. Horatio Nelson, Lady Hamilton
1969	Italy	Zorro Marquis of Navarre	Zorro marchese di Navarra	Franco Montemurro	Adventure, Comedy, History, Romance, Western. Peninsular War

== 1970s ==
Year	Country	Main title (Alternative title)	Original title (Original script)	Director	Subject
1970	Italy; Soviet Union	Waterloo	Ватерлоо	Sergei Bondarchuk	Action, Biography, Drama, History, War. Battle of Waterloo
1970	United Kingdom; Switzerland	The Adventures of Gerard		Jerzy Skolimowski	Adventure, Comedy, History, War. Based on a short stories Brigadier Gerard.
1971	Spain	Goya, a Story of Solitude	Goya, historia de una soledad	Nino Quevedo	Biography, Drama. Francisco Goya, Peninsular War
1971	East Germany; Soviet Union; Bulgaria; Yugoslavia	Goya or the Hard Way to Enlightenment	Goya – oder der arge Weg der Erkenntnis	Konrad Wolf	Drama. Francisco Goya, Peninsular War
1972	East Germany		Lützower	Werner W. Wallroth	Drama. Based on the play Lützower.
1973	Spain; France	The Guerrilla	La guerrilla	Rafael Gil	Drama. Peninsular War
1973	United Kingdom	Bequest to the Nation		James Cellan Jones	Drama, History. Based on the play A Bequest to the Nation. Horatio Nelson, Lady Hamilton
1974	East Germany	Elective Affinities	Die Wahlverwandtschaften	Siegfried Kühn	Drama. Based on a novel Elective Affinities.
1975	France; United States	Love and Death		Woody Allen	Comedy, War.
1976	West Germany; France	The Marquise of O	Die Marquise von O... La Marquise d'O...	Éric Rohmer	Drama, History. Based on a novel The Marquise of O.
1976	Italy; West Germany; Yugoslavia	The Loves and Times of Scaramouche	Le avventure e gli amori di Scaramouche	Enzo G. Castellari	Comedy.
1977	United Kingdom	The Duellists		Ridley Scott	Drama, War. Based on a short story The Duel.
1978	West Germany	The Tailor from Ulm	Der Schneider von Ulm	Edgar Reitz	Drama, History. Albrecht Berblinger
1978	Spain		Avisa a Curro Jiménez	Rafael Romero Marchent	Adventure. Peninsular War

== 1980s ==
Year	Country	Main title (Alternative title)	Original title (Original script)	Director	Subject
1980	Soviet Union	Squadron of Flying Hussars	Эскадрон гусар летучих	Nikita Khubov; Stanislav Rostotsky	War. French invasion of Russia, Denis Davydov
1981	Italy; France	The Marquis of Grillo	Il Marchese del Grillo	Mario Monicelli	Comedy, History. Onofrio del Grillo, Pope Pius VII
1981	Belgium	Up to men's height	À hauteur d'homme	Jean-Marie Piquint	History. Louis-Joseph Seutin
1982	Spain; Mexico	The legend of the drum	La leyenda del tambor	Jorge Grau	Adventure, Drama, War. Drummer of El Bruc, Battles of El Bruch, Peninsular War
1982	France; Italy; Spain	The Guerrilla	La Guérilléra	Pierre Kast	War. Peninsular War
1984	Austria	Raffl		Christian Berger	Drama, History. Andreas Hofer, Tyrolean Rebellion
1985	Soviet Union	Bagration	Багратион ბაგრატიონი	Giuli Chokhonelidze; Guguli Mgeladze	Biography, Drama, War. Pyotr Bagration, French invasion of Russia
1986	Hungary; Czechoslovakia		Akli Miklós	György Révész	Comedy, History. Based on the novel Akli Miklós.
1989	France		La Soule	Michel Sibra	Drama, History. Battle of Vitoria, Peninsular War

== 1990s ==
Year	Country	Main title (Alternative title)	Original title (Original script)	Director	Subject
1992	France	The Supper	Le Souper	Édouard Molinaro	Drama, History. Based on the play Le Souper
1994	France	Colonel Chabert	Le Colonel Chabert	Yves Angelo	Drama, History, Romance, War. Based on a novel Colonel Chabert
1995	United Kingdom; United States; France	Persuasion		Roger Michell	Drama. Based on the novel Persuasion
1999	Spain; Italy	Goya in Bordeaux	Goya en Burdeos	Carlos Saura	Biography, Drama, War. Francisco Goya, María Cayetana de Silva, Peninsular War
1999	Poland; France	Sir Thaddeus	Pan Tadeusz	Andrzej Wajda	Drama, History, Romance, War. Based on the poem Pan Tadeusz.
1999	Germany; Austria	The Bride	Die Braut	Egon Günther	Biography, Drama. Johann Wolfgang von Goethe, Christiane Vulpius

== 2000s ==
Year	Country	Main title (Alternative title)	Original title (Original script)	Director	Subject
2000	United Kingdom; Germany	Quills		Philip Kaufman	Biography, Drama. Based on the play Quills. Marquis de Sade
2000	Spain; France; United Kingdom	Sabotage!		Esteban Ibarretxe; Jose Miguel Ibarretxe	Battle of Waterloo
2002	Czech Republic	Waterloo in Czech	Waterloo po česku	Vít Olmer	Comedy.
2003	Russia	Golden age	Золотой век	Ilya Khotinenko	History, Romance.
2003	United States	Master and Commander: The Far Side of the World		Peter Weir	Action, Adventure, Drama, War. Based on the novels of the Aubrey–Maturin series.
2004	United States; United Kingdom; India	Vanity Fair		Mira Nair	Drama. Based on a novel Vanity Fair
2005	France	1805		Jan Belletti	
2006	Italy	Fire on me	Fuoco su di me	Lamberto Lambertini	History. Joachim Murat
2006	United States; Spain	Goya's Ghosts		Miloš Forman	Biography, Drama, History. Francisco Goya, Peninsular War
2008	Spain	Blood in May	Sangre de mayo	José Luis Garci	History. Based on a novels La corte de Carlos IV, El 19 de marzo y el 2 de mayo. Dos de Mayo Uprising, Peninsular War

== 2010s ==
Year	Country	Main title (Alternative title)	Original title (Original script)	Director	Subject
2010	Germany; Italy	The Holy Land of Tyrol	Bergblut	Philipp J. Pamer	Drama, History, War. Tyrolean Rebellion
2010	Spain	Bruc, the challenge	Bruc	Daniel Benmayor	Drama, History, War. Drummer of El Bruc, Battles of El Bruch, Peninsular War
2012	Portugal; France	Lines of Wellington	Linhas de Wellington	Valeria Sarmiento	Drama, History, War. Battle of Bussaco, Lines of Torres Vedras, André Masséna, Arthur Wellesley, Peninsular War
2012	Russia	The Ballad of Uhlans	Уланская баллада	Oleg Fesenko	Adventure, Drama, History. French invasion of Russia
2012	Ukraine; United States; Russia	Rzhevsky Versus Napoleon	Ржевский против Наполеона	Maryus Vaysberg	Comedy. French invasion of Russia
2014	Russia	Vasilisa	Василиса	Anton Sivers	History, Romance. Vasilisa Kozhina, French invasion of Russia
2016	Russia	What the French Don't Talk About	О чем молчат французы	Vladimir Shevelkov	Comedy, Drama, History, Mystery, Romance, Thriller. Based on a novel What the French Don't Talk About.
2018	France; Belgium	Return of the Hero	Le retour du héros	Laurent Tirard	Comedy, History.
2018	France	The Emperor of Paris	L'Empereur de Paris	Jean-François Richet	Adventure, Crime, History, Thriller. Eugène François Vidocq
2019	Russia	Union of Salvation	Союз спасения	Andrei Kravchuk	Action, Adventure, Drama, History, War.

== 2020s ==
Year	Country	Main title (Alternative title)	Original title (Original script)	Director	Subject
2022	Portugal	Burnt Earth	Terra Queimada	Paulo César Fajardo	Drama, History, War. Battle of Bussaco, Peninsular War
2023	United States; United Kingdom	Napoleon		Ridley Scott	Action, Biography, Drama, History, War. Napoleon
2023	United States	Widow Clicquot		Thomas Napper	Drama. Madame Clicquot Ponsardin
2025	Russia	The Secret of Admiral Ushakov	Тайна адмирала Ушакова	Dmitriy Korobkin	Adventure, History. Fyodor Ushakov
2026	Russia	Red Ghost 1812	Красный призрак 1812	Andrey Bogatyrev	Action, Adventure, Drama, War. French invasion of Russia
2026	Russia	Hunting the Emperor	Охота на императора	Aleksey Pimanov	Drama, History. French invasion of Russia, French occupation of Moscow

== Upcoming films ==
Year	Country	Main title (Alternative title)	Original title (Original script)	Director	Subject
2026	Russia	Alexander I	Александр I	Morad Abdel-Fattakh	Biography, Drama, History. Alexander I of Russia, French invasion of Russia

== Science fiction, fantasy and horror ==
Year	Country	Main title (Alternative title)	Original title (Original script)	Director	Subject
1940	United States	The Blue Bird		Walter Lang	Adventure, Family, Fantasy. Based on the play The Blue Bird.
1946	United Kingdom	The Curse of the Wraydons		Victor M. Gover	Drama, Horror. Based on the play Spring-Heeled Jack. Spring-heeled Jack
1963	United States	The Terror		Roger Corman; Francis Ford Coppola; Dennis Jakob; Monte Hellman; Jack Hill; Jack Nicholson	Horror, Thriller.
1964	Italy; France	Castle of the Living Dead	Il Castello dei Morti Vivi; Le Chateau des Morts Vivants	Warren Kiefer	Horror, Sci-Fi, Thriller.
1965	Poland	The Saragossa Manuscript	Rękopis znaleziony w Saragossie	Wojciech Jerzy Has	Comedy, Drama, Fantasy. Based on a novel The Manuscript Found in Saragossa. Peninsular War
2005	United States; Czech Republic; United Kingdom	The Brothers Grimm		Terry Gilliam	Action, Adventure, Comedy, Fantasy, Horror, Mystery, Thriller. Brothers Grimm
2010	Austria	Tartarus		Stefan Müller	Adventure, Drama, Horror, Sci-Fi.
2018	United Kingdom	The Necromancer		Stuart Brennan	Horror.

== Television films ==
Year	Country	Main title (Alternative title)	Original title (Original script)	Director	Subject
1956	West Germany	Colonel Chabert	Oberst Chabert	Volker von Collande	Drama. Based on a novel Colonel Chabert
1958	United Kingdom	Victory		Rex Tucker	Drama, Family.
1960	West Germany	Madame Sans-Gêne		John Olden	Drama, History. Based on the play Madame Sans-Gêne. Catherine Hübscher
1963	France	Madame Sans Gêne		Claude Barma	Comedy, Drama, Romance, War. Based on the play Madame Sans-Gêne. Catherine Hübscher
1964	Finland	Colonel Chabert	Eversti Chabert	Mauno Hyvönen	Drama. Based on a novel Colonel Chabert
1966	West Germany	Colonel Chabert	Oberst Chabert	Ludwig Cremer	Drama. Based on a novel Colonel Chabert
1967	Czechoslovakia	Waterloo		Jiří Bělka	Biography, Drama, History. Battle of Waterloo
1969	West Germany	Waterloo		Jiří Weiss	Battle of Waterloo
1970	Spain	Lola the Coal Girl	Lola, la piconera	Fernando García de la Vega	Drama, Musical. Peninsular War
1971	Czechoslovakia	Madame Sans-Géne		František Laurin	Comedy. Catherine Hübscher
1975	West Germany	The cats' bridge	Der Katzensteg	Peter Meincke	Drama. Based on a novel The Cats' Bridge
1978	Soviet Union	Colonel Chabert	Полковник Шабер	Irina Sorokina	Drama, History. Based on a novel Colonel Chabert
1980	East Germany	Clausewitz - Portrait of a Prussian General	Clausewitz - Lebensbild eines preußischen Generals	Wolf-Dieter Panse	History. Carl von Clausewitz
1989	Soviet Union	Either a man or a woman	То мужчина, то женщина	Aleksandr Nagovitsyn	Drama, History, Romance. Nadezhda Durova, French invasion of Russia
1989	Hungary	Napóleon		András Sólyom	Drama.
1991	Germany	The martial adventures of a peacemaker	Die kriegerischen Abenteuer eines Friedfertigen	Peter Hill	Action, Adventure, Comedy, History. Based on the novel Kriegerische Abenteuer eines Friedfertigen.
1998	France; Germany; Ireland; United Kingdom	St. Ives		Harry Hook	Drama, Romance. Based on a novel St. Ives.
2002	Austria; Germany; Italy	Andreas Hofer - The freedom of the eagle	Andreas Hofer – Die Freiheit des Adlers	Xaver Schwarzenberger	Drama, History, War. Andreas Hofer, Tyrolean Rebellion
2002	France		Madame Sans-Gêne	Philippe de Broca	Comedy, Romance. Based on the play Madame Sans-Gêne. Catherine Hübscher
2005	United Kingdom	Trafalgar Battle Surgeon		Justin Hardy	Biography, Drama. Battle of Trafalgar
2006	Germany	The Judas of Tyrol	Der Judas von Tirol	Werner Asam	Drama. Andreas Hofer, Tyrolean Rebellion
2006	France	Joséphine		Jean-Marc Vervoort	History.

== Television series ==
Year	Country	Main title (Alternative title)	Original title (Original script)	Director	Subject
1955	United Kingdom	St. Ives		Rex Tucker	Adventure. Based on a novel St. Ives.
1956	United Kingdom	Vanity Fair		Campbell Logan	Drama. Based on a novel Vanity Fair
1957	United Kingdom	The Adventures of Peter Simple		Naomi Capon	Drama, Family. Based on a novel Peter Simple
1960–61	France	History exceeds fiction	L'histoire dépasse la fiction	Jean Kerchbron	History. Based on the play Lorenzaccio.
1961	United Kingdom	Triton		Rex Tucker	Adventure.
1966–67	Spain		Diego de Acevedo	Ricardo Blasco	Peninsular War
1966–67	Soviet Union	War and Peace	Война и мир	Sergei Bondarchuk	Drama, Romance, War. Based on a novel War and Peace. War of the Third Coalition, French invasion of Russia
1967	United Kingdom	St. Ives		Christopher Barry	Adventure. Based on a novel St. Ives.
1967	United Kingdom	Vanity Fair		David Giles	Drama. Based on a novel Vanity Fair
1968	United Kingdom	Triton		Michael Ferguson	Drama.
1969	United Kingdom	Pegasus		Michael Ferguson	Drama.
1972–73	United Kingdom	War and Peace		John Davies	Drama, History, War. Based on a novel War and Peace. War of the Third Coalition, French invasion of Russia
1976–78	Spain	Curro Jiménez		Antonio Drove; Mario Camus; Joaquín Romero Marchenet	Action, Adventure, Comedy, Drama, Fantasy, History, Mystery. Andrés López, Peninsular War
1978	East Germany		Scharnhorst	Wolf-Dieter Panse	Drama, War. Gerhard von Scharnhorst
1979-80	France	Joséphine or the comedy of ambitions	Joséphine ou la Comédie des ambitions	Robert Mazoyer	Biography, Drama, History.
1981	United Kingdom; Canada	Smuggler		Dennis Abey; Jim Goddard; Charles Crichton	Adventure, History.
1981	Hungary	The nameless castle	A névtelen vár	Éva Zsurzs	Drama
1981	France	Brides of the Empire	Les Fiancées de l'Empire	Jacques Doniol-Valcroze	History, Romance.
1982	Italy; France; West Germany	Charterhouse of Parma	La Certosa di Parma	Mauro Bolognini	Drama, History. Based on a novel The Charterhouse of Parma.
1982	Spain	The black mask	La máscara negra	Antonio Giménez-Rico; Emilio Martínez-Lázaro; José Antonio Páramo	Adventure. Peninsular War
1982	United Kingdom	I Remember Nelson		Simon Langton	Adventure, Biography, Drama, History, Romance, War. Horatio Nelson, Lady Hamilton
1983	Spain	The disasters of war	Los desastres de la guerra	Mario Camus	Action, Drama, History. Peninsular War
1983	France	Marianne, a star for Napoleon	Marianne, une étoile pour Napoléon	Marion Sarraut	Drama, History. Based on a novels Marianne
1984	West Germany	Before the storm	Vor dem Sturm	Franz Peter Wirth	Based on a novel Vor dem Sturm. Landsturm
1985	Spain; Italy		Goya	José Ramón Larraz	Biography, Drama. Francisco Goya, Peninsular War
1987	United States; France	Napoleon and Josephine: A Love Story		Richard T. Heffron	History, Romance, War.
1987	United Kingdom	Vanity Fair		Diarmuid Lawrence; Michael Owen Morris	Based on a novel Vanity Fair
1991	Belgium; France; Canada; Poland	Napoleon	Napoléon et l'Europe	José Fonseca e Costa; Eberhard Itzenplitz; Pierre Lary; Janusz Majewski; Francis Megahy; Krzysztof Zanussi	Drama, History.
1993	Russia	Curse Duran	Проклятие Дюран	Viktor Titov	Based on a novel Les Exploits de Rocambole
1993-2008	United Kingdom	Sharpe		Tom Clegg	Based on a novels Sharpe
1995	Spain	Curro Jiménez: The return of a legend	Curro Jiménez: El regreso de una leyenda	Benito Rabal; José Antonio Páramo; Joaquín Luis Romero Marchent; Julio Sánchez Valdés	Action, Adventure, Drama, History. Andrés López, Peninsular War
1998	United Kingdom; United States	Vanity Fair		Marc Munden	Drama, Romance. Based on a novel Vanity Fair
1998-2003	United Kingdom	Hornblower		Andrew Grieve	Adventure, Drama, War. Based on a C. S. Forester novels.
2000	United States; New Zealand	Jack of All Trades		Eric A. Morris	Adventure, Action, Comedy, Fantasy.
2002	France; Germany; Italy; Canada; United States; United Kingdom; Hungary; Spain; Czech Republic	Napoléon		Yves Simoneau	Adventure, Biography, Drama, History, Romance, War.
2003	Russia	The Northern Sphinx	Северный сфинкс	Arkadi Sirenko	Based on a novel The Northern Sphinx.
2005	Russia	Aide-de-camps of Love	Адъютанты любви	Dmitriy Magonov	Drama, Romance.
2007	Italy; France; Germany; Russia; Poland	War and Peace	Guerre et Paix; Guerra e pace	Robert Dornhelm	Drama, History, Romance, War. Based on a novel War and Peace. War of the Third Coalition, French invasion of Russia
2008	Spain	2 May, the freedom of a nation	2 de mayo, la libertad de una nación	María Cereceda; Gonzalo Baz	History. Peninsular War
2012	Italy; France	The Charterhouse of Parma	La Certosa di Parma	Cinzia TH Torrini	Drama, History. Based on a novel The Charterhouse of Parma.
2012	Portugal; France	The Lines of Torres Vedras	As Linhas de Torres Vedras	Valeria Sarmiento	War. Battle of Bussaco, Lines of Torres Vedras, André Masséna, Arthur Wellesley, Peninsular War
2015	United Kingdom	Jonathan Strange & Mr Norrell		Toby Haynes	Fantasy, War. Based on a novel Jonathan Strange & Mr Norrell
2016	United Kingdom	War & Peace		Tom Harper	Drama, History, Romance, War. Based on a novel War and Peace. War of the Third Coalition, French invasion of Russia
2018	United Kingdom; United States	Vanity Fair		James Strong	Drama. Based on a novel Vanity Fair
2020	United Kingdom; United States	Belgravia		John Alexander	Drama, Romance. Based on a novel Belgravia. Duchess of Richmond's ball
2022	Russia	Union of Salvation. Time for anger	Союз Спасения. Время гнева	Nikita Vysotskiy; Ilya Lebedev	Biography, Drama, History.
2025	Russia	Alexander I	Александр I	Artem Nasybulin	Louis Antoine, Alexander I of Russia, War of the Third Coalition
2025	United States; France	Carême		Martin Bourboulon	Adventure, Biography, Comedy, Drama, History, Romance, Thriller. Based on the book Cooking for Kings: The Life of Antonin Carême, The First Celebrity Chef. Marie-Antoine Carême
2026	United States	Seeking Persephone		John Lyde	Romance. Based on a novel Seeking Persephone.
