= The Two Sergeants =

The Two Sergeants (Italian:I due sergenti) may refer to:

- The Two Sergeants (play), an 1823 play by the French writer Théodore Baudouin d'Aubigny
- The Two Sergeants (1913 film), an Italian silent film directed by Eugenio Perego
- The Two Sergeants (1922 film), an Italian silent film directed by Guido Brignone
- The Two Sergeants (1936 film), an Italian film directed by Enrico Guazzoni
- The Two Sergeants (1951 film), an Italian film directed by Carlo Alberto Chiesa
