= St Ives =

St Ives may refer to:

== Places ==
=== Australia ===
- St Ives, New South Wales, a suburb in Sydney
- St Ives, South Australia, a locality in the Adelaide Hills
- St Ives Gold Mine, a gold mine near Kambalda, Western Australia

=== England ===
- St Ives, Cornwall
  - St Ives railway station, in the town
  - St Ives (UK Parliament constituency), the parliamentary constituency that covers the far west of Cornwall
- St Ives, Cambridgeshire, formerly in Huntingdonshire
  - St Ives (Cambridgeshire) railway station, a former railway station in the town
- St Ives, Dorset
- Bingley St Ives or St. Ives Estate, West Yorkshire

== Saints ==
- Ivo of Kermartin, a Breton lawyer canonized in 1347
- Ivo of Chartres
- Ia of Cornwall or Ives, patron of the Cornish village
- Ivo of Ramsey or Ives, patron of the Cambridgeshire village

== Arts and entertainment ==
- St. Ives (novel), an 1897 novel by Robert Louis Stevenson
- St. Ives (1976 film), starring Charles Bronson
- St. Ives (1998 film), starring Jean-Marc Barr and Miranda Richardson
- St. Ives (TV series), a mini-series broadcast in 1955

== Other uses ==
- St. Ives Times & Echo, newspaper based in St Ives, Cornwall
- St Ives RFC (Cornwall), a rugby union club based in St Ives, Cornwall
- St Ives School, a group of artists in St Ives, Cornwall
- St Ives School (academy), a secondary school in St Ives, Cornwall
- St Ives PLC, a print company founded in St Ives, Cambridgeshire
- SS St Ives, a ship originally named Empire Mammoth

== See also ==
- "As I was going to St Ives", a nursery rhyme
- St. Ives Compact, a minor Inner Sphere nation in the fictional BattleTech universe
- Ives, a surname
- St Ive, Cornwall
