= Paul Grist =

Paul Grist may refer to:

- Paul Grist (actor) (1939–2026), British actor
- Paul Grist (comics) (born 1960), British comic book creator
