= Drummer of El Bruc =

Catalan legend

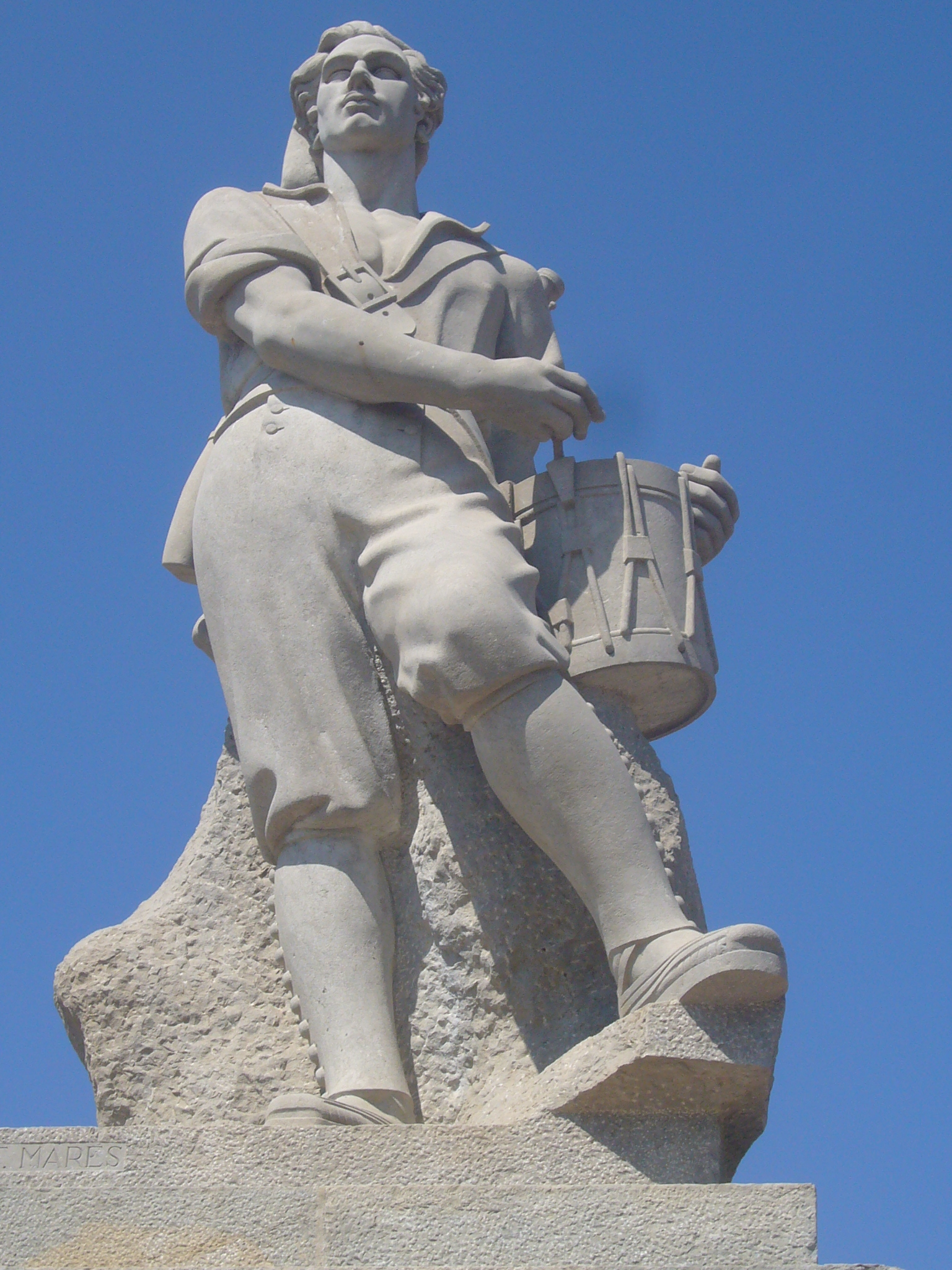
Monument to the Drummer of El Bruc

The Drummer of El Bruc is a Catalan legend derived from what happened during the Battle of El Bruc between French and Spanish forces in the Peninsular War. According to the legend, the French defeat was due to a young boy who played the drums during the battle, the sound of which, echoing in the surrounding mountains, convinced the French troops that the number of their enemies was actually much larger than it really was. The name of the drummer is said to have been Isidre Lluçà i Casanoves, historically written as Isidre Llussà (1791–1809), a peasant born in the nearby Santpedor.

Monuments have been erected to the drummer in El Bruc and Barcelona.
