= As I was going to St Ives =

Traditional English riddle

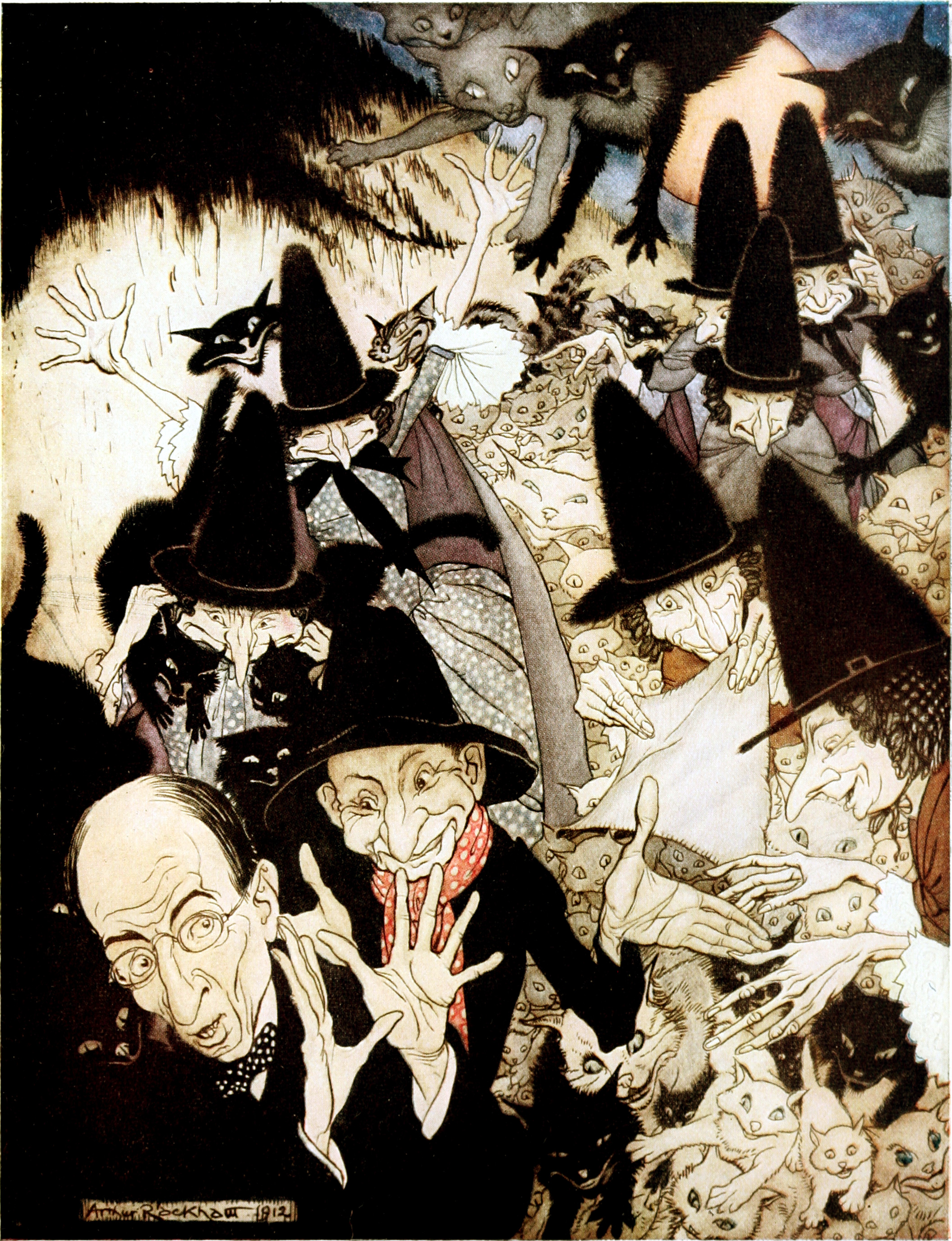
1912 illustration of the riddle by Arthur Rackham

"As I was going to St Ives" (Roud 19772) is a traditional English-language nursery rhyme in the form of a riddle.

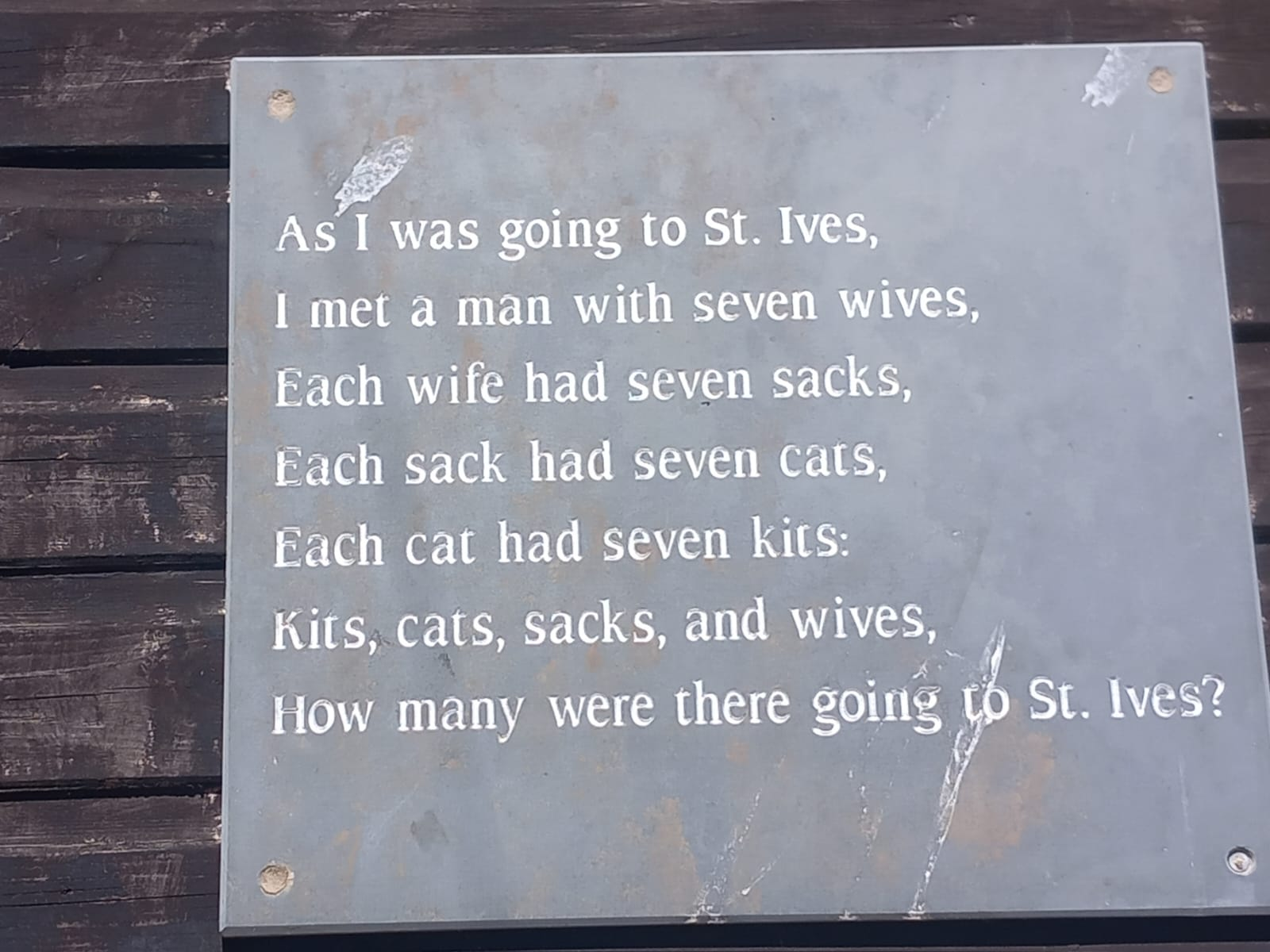
The poem on a plaque in St Ives, Cornwall

The most common modern version is:

As I was going to St Ives,
I met a man with seven wives,
Each wife had seven sacks,
Each sack had seven cats,
Each cat had seven kits:
Kits, cats, sacks, and wives,
How many were there going to St Ives?

== Origins ==
The following version is found in a manuscript (Harley MS 7316) dating from approximately 1730:

As I went to St Ives
I met Nine Wives
And every Wife had nine Sacs,
And every Sac had nine Cats
And every Cat had nine Kittens

A version very similar to that accepted today was published in the Weekly Magazine of 4 August 1779:

As I was going to St Ives,
Upon the road I met seven wives;
Every wife had seven sacks,
Every sack had seven cats,
Every cat had seven kits:
Kits, cats, sacks, and wives,
How many were going to St Ives?

The earliest known published versions omit the words "a man with" immediately preceding the seven (or nine) wives, but he is present in the rhyme by 1837.

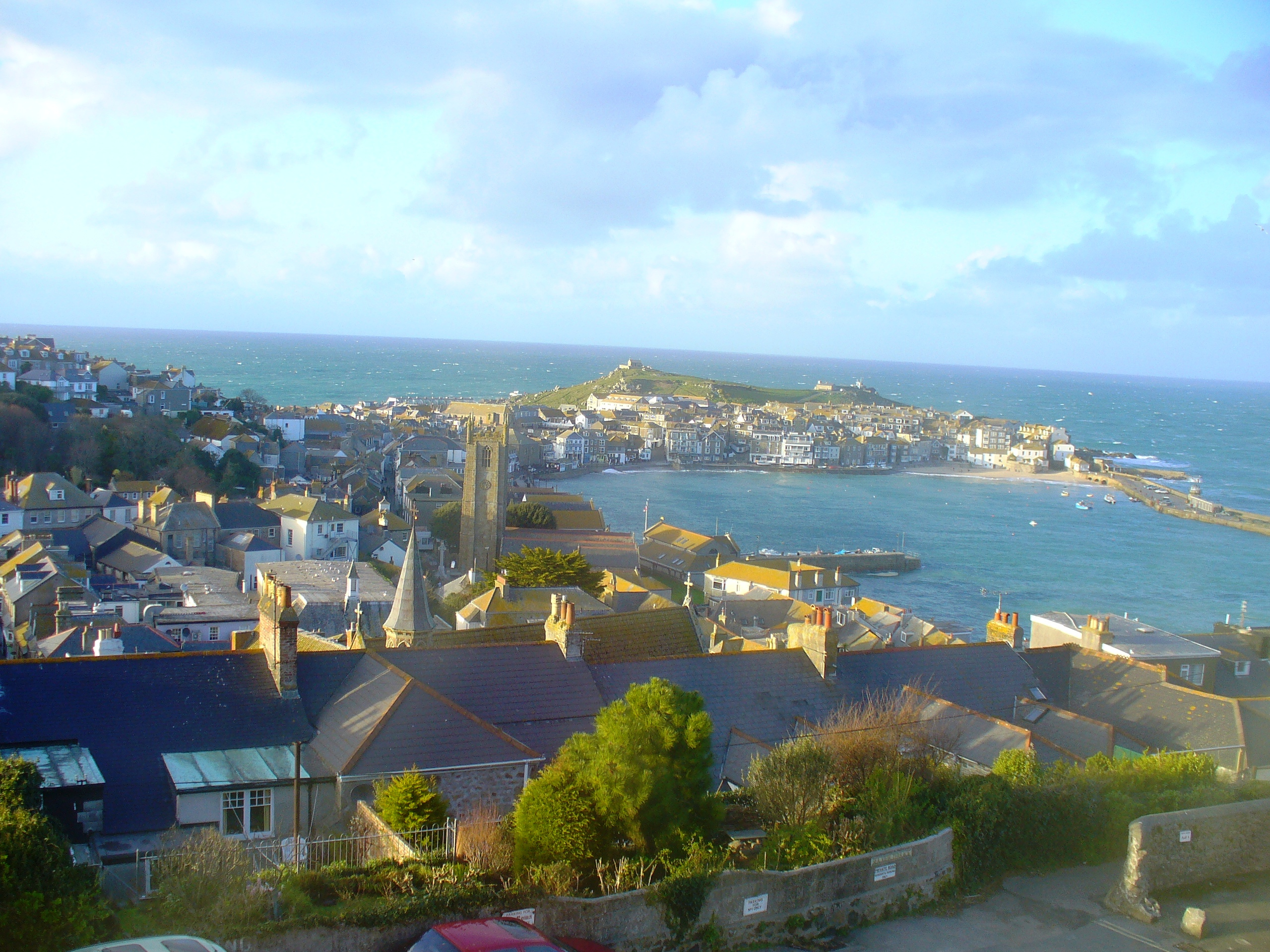
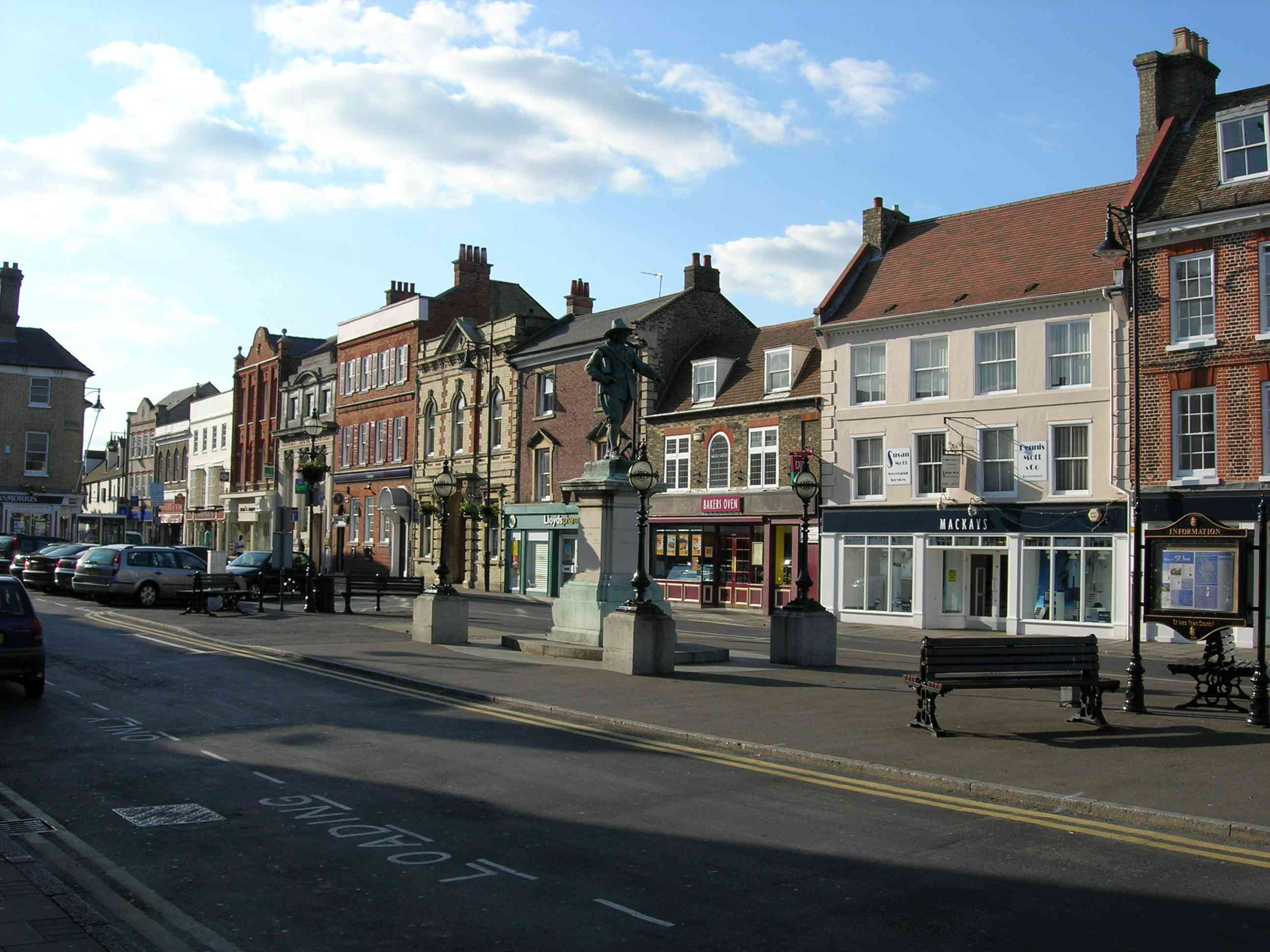
The riddle is most likely about the town of St Ives in Cornwall (left), but may alternatively refer to St Ives in Cambridgeshire (right).

There were a number of places called St Ives in England when the rhyme was first published. It is generally thought that the rhyme refers to St Ives, Cornwall, when it was a busy fishing port and had many cats to stop the rats and mice destroying the fishing gear, although some people argue it was St Ives, Cambridgeshire, as this is an ancient market town and therefore a similarly plausible destination.

== Answers ==
The traditional understanding of this rhyme is that only one is going to St Ives—the narrator. All of the others are coming from St Ives. The trick is that the listener assumes that all of the others must be totalled up, forgetting that only the narrator is said to be going to St Ives. If everyone mentioned in the riddle were bound for St Ives, then the number would be 2,802: the narrator, the man and his seven wives, 49 sacks, 343 cats, and 2,401 kits.

This interpretation provided the basis for a verse reply from "Philo-Rhithmus" of Edinburgh, in the 8 September 1779 issue of the Weekly Magazine:

Why the deuce do you give yourselves so much vexation,
And puzzle your brains with a long calculation
Of the number of cats, with their kittens and sacks,
Which went to St Ives, on the old women's backs,
As you seem to suppose? – Don't you see that the cunning
Old Querist went only? – The rest were all coming.
But grant the wives went too, – as sure's they were married,
Eight only could go, – for the rest were all carried.

Owing to various ambiguities in the language of the riddle, several other solutions are possible. While it is generally assumed that the narrator met the man and his wives coming from St Ives, the word "met" does not necessarily exclude the possibility that they fell in while travelling in the same direction. In this case, there is no trick; just an arithmetical calculation of the number of kits, cats, sacks, and wives, along with the man and the narrator. Another possible answer is that the man with seven wives might have seven wives, but that none of them was accompanying him on the journey. One way of stating the answer, taking account of these ambiguities, is "at least one, the narrator plus anyone who happens to be travelling in the same direction". Still other interpretations concern the phrasing of the question, which might be understood to exclude the narrator. If only the narrator were travelling to St Ives, but the phrase, "kits, cats, sacks, and wives" excludes him, then the answer to the riddle is zero. If everyone – including those being carried – were travelling to St Ives, but only the kits, cats, sacks, and wives are counted, then the answer is precisely 2,800.

== Older works ==
=== Rhind mathematical papyrus ===
A similar problem is found in the Rhind Mathematical Papyrus (Problem 79), dated to around 1650 BC. The papyrus is translated as follows:

A house inventory
		houses	7
1	2,801	cats	49
2	5,602	mice	343
4	11,204	spelt	2,301 [sic]
		hekat	16,807
Total	19,607	Total	19,607

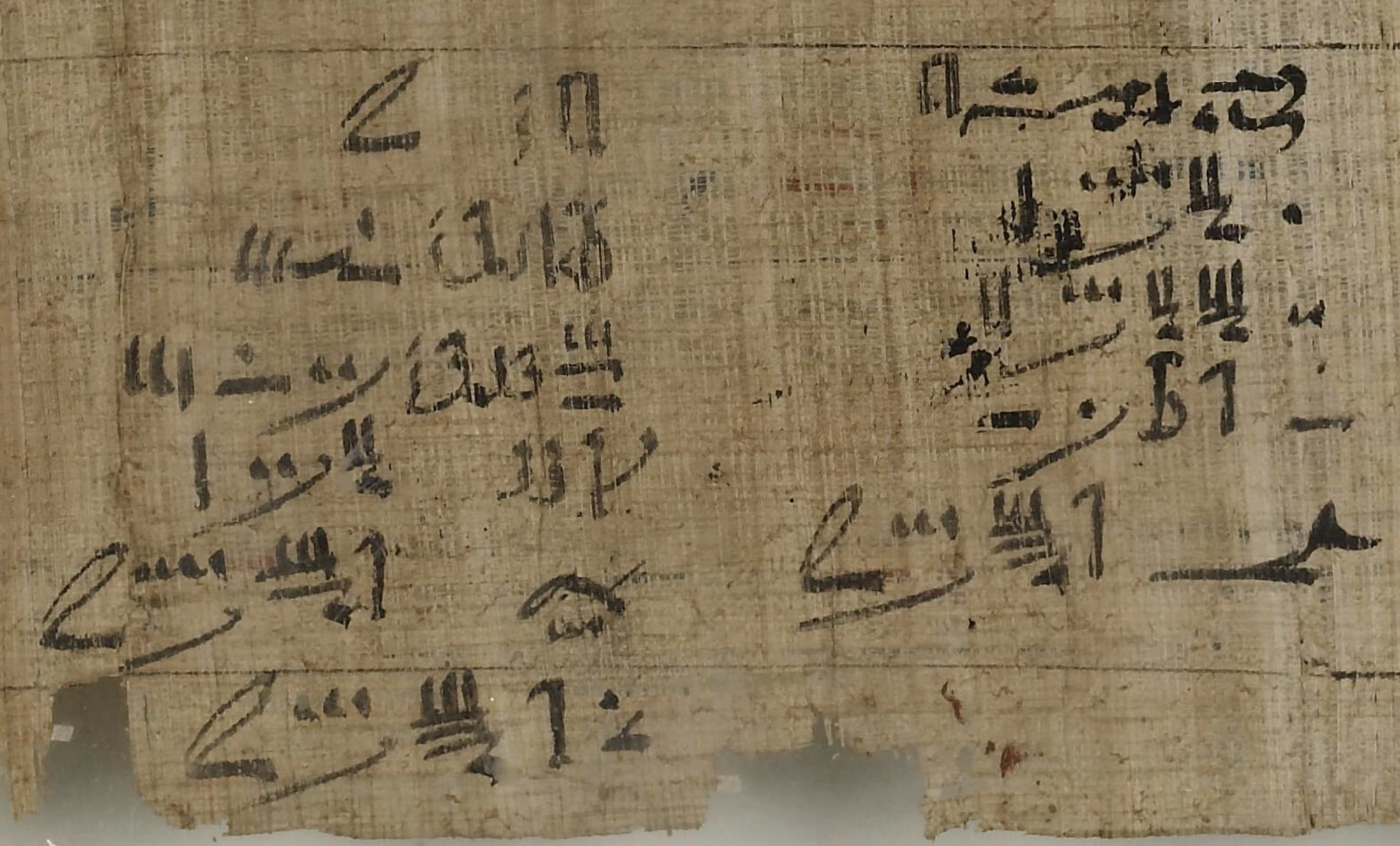

The problem appears to be an illustration of an algorithm for multiplying numbers. The sequence 7, 7^{2}, 7^{3}, 7^{4}, 7^{5} appears in the right-hand column, and the terms 2,801, 2×2,801, 4×2,801 appear in the left; the sum on the left is 7×2,801 = 19,607, the same as the sum of the terms on the right. The equality of the two geometric sequences can be stated as the equation (2^{0} + 2^{1} + 2^{2})(7^{0} + 7^{1} + 7^{2} + 7^{3} + 7^{4}) = 7^{1} + 7^{2} + 7^{3} + 7^{4} + 7^{5}, which relies on the coincidence 2^{0} + 2^{1} + 2^{2} = 7.

Note that the author of the papyrus listed a wrong value for the fourth power of 7; it should be 2,401, not 2,301. However, the sum of the powers (19,607) is correct.

The problem has been paraphrased by modern commentators as a story problem involving houses, cats, mice, and grain, although in the Rhind Mathematical Papyrus there is no discussion beyond the bare outline stated above. The hekat was 1/30 of a cubic cubit (approximately 4.8 L or 1.1 imp gal or 1.3 US gal).

=== Fibonacci ===
In Fibonacci's book Liber Abaci (published in 1202), the problem "Seven Old Men Go to Rome" again involves summing powers of seven, to one more level: seven men each have seven mules, each mule carries seven sacks, each sack contains seven loaves of bread, each loaf has seven knives to cut it, and each knife has seven scabbards. (The text mentions 49 loaves with seven knives, but the rest of the problem makes clear the interpretation that there are seven knives per loaf.) The problem is to sum the geometric series
$$7+7^2+7^3+7^4+7^5+7^6=137\,256.$$
