= Juan Baget =

Spanish military officer

- Born: 25 November 1775; La Selva del Camp (Tarragona), Spain
- Died: August 1809 or 1818 Zaragoza or Barcelona
- Conflicts: Peninsular War

Juan de la Cruz Baget y Pamiés (Note: The surname is spelt both Baget and Baiget in the Spanish literature. Hamilton spells it Bajet.) (25 November 1775 – August 1809 or 1818) was a lawyer and commanding officer of the Catalonian somatenes and miqueletes during the Peninsular War.

== Early career ==
Born into a noble family in Lerida, after studying Law at the University of Cervera Baget entered into legal practice, both as a lawyer and later as a notary. Some sources suggest he was also a retired captain of the regular Spanish army.

== Peninsular War ==
Following the Dos de Mayo Uprising (1808), Baget set up, armed and financed, at his own expense, a group of somatenes, with which, at the head of the somatenes and the 1st Tercio de Miqueletes, he was able to lead one of first defeats of French forces in Spain, at the second battle of El Bruch, on 14 June 1808, a month before General Dupont de l'Étang's momentous open-field defeat at Bailen.

The Junta de Lérida had appointed Baget commander-in-chief of the 1st Tercio de Miqueletes and commanding officer of the Volunteer Somatenes —including the Somatenes de Igualada and Verdú, among others— with three captains, four lieutenants and two second lieutenants at his orders, an armed force with which he was able to defeat a far greater force of 5,000 troops led by General Duhesme.

Shortly thereafter, between 19 and 30 June 1808, Baget organised the defence of the right bank of the Llobregat river, between Sant Boi de Llobregat and Martorell, against General Lechi's 7,000 troops. delegating the defence of the latter in that of an experienced artilleryman, Juan Seró, who had escaped the occupation of Barcelona, along with two cannons, five sergeants, seven corporals and 32 regular troops. Seró also had over 2,500 Somatenes and a Tercio of Migueletes de Cervera under his command.

The following month, the captain-general of Aragon, Palafox, recommended that the Junta Suprema de Cataluña send Baget to Mahón to assist in organising the defence of that city and then to accompany Domingo Traggia, marqués del Palacio, who was leaving his post as military governor of Menorca to take up his appointment as Captain-General of Catalonia, charged with pacifying the region, which was then in a state of anarchy.

On 17 July 1808, the Junta General de Defensa de Lérida promoted Baget to colonel. Traggia and Baget landed at Tarragona on 22 July 1808 and marched towards Gerona, to force the French to lift the siege there.

The Marqués del Palacio then succeeded Baget in the defence of the Llobregat, and Baget, with 3,000 troops and five cannons, went on to lift the siege at Figueras, on 13 August 1808, forcing the French troops to withdraw, abandoning their heavy artillery.

Meeting up with a Spanish force led by Brigadier, the Conde de Caldagues, commander-in-chief of the Army of Gerona, and commander-in-chief of the Borbon Infantry Regiment, at Martorell, Baget's force would form the second column of the four that Caldagues led to relieve Gerona (16 August).

The following 31 August, Baget returned to Lérida with the four companies with which he had fought at Bruch, Llobregat and Gerona.

At the end of November 1808, Baget was wounded at the defence of Rosas where, with 500 migueletes and 50 regular troops, they were able to repel a French night attack, the 26-27, only to have to retreat themselves the following morning when the French forces, now reinforced, returned.

On 15 May 1809, at the head of the 1st Tercio de Miqueletes de Lérida, he participated, together with colonels Perena and Rodríguez, in the victory of the so-called battle of the Cinca River, at which Marshal Habert's 3,500 troops were forced to abandon Barbastro and Tamarite, leaving behind 800 prisoners.

In August 1809, however, the French forces commanded by Habert were able to ford the river at 2 a.m. and capture Baget at Torres de Segre, along with 150 other men and two captains, and take him prisoner to Zaragoza. In his dispatches, the commander of the Army of Aragon and governor of that region, Suchet commended Colonel Burthe and his hussars for the action, referring to the capture of the "famous General [sic] Baget... considered the "Palafox" of Lerida".

The official gazette, Gazeta del Gobierno (14 December 1809), reported that they had been informed on 30 November that, contrary to what might have been expected, Colonel Baget was being treated well at Zaragoza.

== Death ==
There are two versions as to his death. The first claims he was shot by a firing squad shortly after his capture. The second version puts his death in Barcelona at the end of 1818, after he had returned to Lerida at the end of the war, following his deportation to Paris.
