= Robert Cawdron =

French-born British actor (1921–1997)

- Born: Robert Chattey Cawdron; 29 December 1921; Garches, Hauts-de-Seine, France
- Died: 14 September 1997 (aged 75); Somerset, England
- Occupation: Actor
- Years active: 1947–1981

Robert Chattey Cawdron (29 December 1921 – 14 September 1997) was a French-born British film and television actor. Often cast as police officers, he had a long-running role on Dixon of Dock Green as Detective Inspector Cherry.

== Selected filmography ==
=== Film ===
- Night Beat (1947) - Police Recruit (uncredited)
- The Fallen Idol (1948) - Policeman (uncredited)
- The Chiltern Hundreds (1949) - Sergeant
- Stage Fright (1950) - Policeman (uncredited)
- State Secret (1950) - State Policeman (uncredited)
- The Elusive Pimpernel (1950) - Doorman at the French Embassy (uncredited)
- Highly Dangerous (1950) - Soldier at Barrier During Fire (uncredited)
- Captain Horatio Hornblower (1951) - French Mate on 'Witch of Endor' (uncredited)
- Trent's Last Case (1952) - Police Constable (uncredited)
- Down Among the Z Men (1952) - Sergeant Bullshine
- Street of Shadows (1953) - Det. Sgt. Hadley
- You Can't Escape - Pugilist
- Five on a Treasure Island (1957) - Luke Undown
- A King in New York (1957) - U.S. Marshal
- The One That Got Away (1957) - Officer on Horseback (uncredited)
- Identity Unknown (1960) - Flynn
- October Moth (1960) - The Policeman
- Saturday Night and Sunday Morning (1960) - Robboe
- Ali and the Camel (1960) - (voice)
- Feet of Clay (1960) - Saunders
- The Frightened City (1961) - Nero
- Crosstrap (1962) - Joe
- We Joined the Navy (1962) - Marcel's Bar Patron (uncredited)
- The Fighting Prince of Donegal (1966)
- The Shuttered Room (1967) - John Whately, Susannah's Father
- The Blood Beast Terror (1968) - Chief Constable
- The Private Life of Sherlock Holmes (1970) - Hotel Manager
- Zeppelin (1971) - Officer (uncredited)
- Madhouse (1974) - CID Inspector (uncredited)
- S*P*Y*S (1974) - Vet (uncredited)

=== Television ===
- Dixon of Dock Green (1955-1965) - Det. Insp. Cherry / Insp. Gordon
- The Adventures of the Scarlet Pimpernel (1955) - Chicon / First Agent
- The Count of Monte Cristo (1956) - Rico
- Assignment Foreign Legion (1956) - Bolieau
- Sailor of Fortune (1956-1957) - Patron / Demitrios
- Shadow Squad (1957) - Sgt. Telfer
- White Hunter (1957-1958) - Paul Klinger / Doug Gordon
- Educated Evans (1958) - Second Military Policeman
- Ivanhoe (1958) - Sir Mark / Sir Edgar / Bailiff
- Starr and Company (1958) - Marvin Lavery
- The New Adventures of Charlie Chan (1958) - Rodney Ames / Inspector Von Der Reyden
- Dial 999 (1958-1959) - Drew / Stoker / Corby
- The Four Just Men (1959) - Farmer
- International Detective (1960) - Emil Dijon (episode "The Dennison Case")
- Danger Man (1960) - President (episode "The Girl in Pink Pajamas")
- Golden Girl (1961) - Det. Supt. Tallerton
- Sir Francis Drake (1961) - Crombie
- Bootsie and Snudge (1962) - Ned Plackett
- No Hiding Place (1962) - Michael O'Grady
- The Saint (1962-1967) - Sergeant Le Duc
- Espionage (1963) - Paratrooper
- Call the Gun Expert (1964) - PC Gutteridge
- The Massingham Affair (1964) - PC Hugh
- 199 Park Lane (1965) - Stuart Long
- The Avengers (1966-1967) - Banks / Horace
- Triton (1968) - Robert Fulton
- Department S (1969) - Police Inspector
- Pegasus (1969) - Robert Fulton
- Doctor Who (1970) - Taltalian
- The Main Chance (1970) - Crispin
- From a Bird's Eye View (1970-1971) - Uncle Bert Quigley / Charlie Duggan
- Doomwatch (1971) - John McAlister
- Owen, M.D. (1971) - Andrew Pearce
- The Persuaders! (1971) - Leyland
- The Prince of Denmark (1974) - Customer
- The Dick Emery Show (1974-1981)

== Bibliography ==
- Paul Cornell, Martin Day & Keith Topping. The Guinness Book of Classic British TV. Guinness, 1996.
