= Colonel Chabert (1943 film) =

- Theatrical release poster
- Directed by: René Le Hénaff
- Screenplay by: Pierre Benoît; Maurice Griffe; Marc Maurette; Yves Mirande
- Based on: Colonel Chabert by Honoré de Balzac
- Produced by: Édouard Harispuru
- Cinematography: Robert Lefebvre
- Edited by: Marguerite Renoir
- Music by: Louis Beydts
- Release date: 1 December 1943
- Running time: 102 minutes

Colonel Chabert (French: Le colonel Chabert) is a 1943 French drama film directed by René Le Hénaff, starring Raimu, Marie Bell, Aimé Clariond and Jacques Baumer. It tells the story of a French officer who is assumed dead during the Napoleonic Wars, but returns ten years later to a very different France, both on a political and personal level. The film is based on the novel Colonel Chabert by Honoré de Balzac. James Travers has written, "This superlative adaptation of Balzac's great novel was one of a number of prestigious film productions made under the Occupation (1940–1944)."

A later film adaptation of the Balzac story, with Gerard Depardieu in the lead, was released in 1994.

== Cast ==
- Raimu as Le colonel Chabert
- Marie Bell as La comtesse Ferraud
- Jacques Baumer as Delbecq
- Aimé Clariond as Maître Derville
- Fernand Fabre as Le comte Ferraud
- Suzanne Flon as Albertine
- Pierre Alcover as Le directeur de l'asile
- Roger Blin as Un clerc
- Jacques Charon as Un clerc
- Pierre Brulé as le fils Ferraud
- Arlette Wherly as la fille Ferraud
