= Colonel Chabert (novella) =

1832 novella by Honoré de Balzac

Le Colonel Chabert
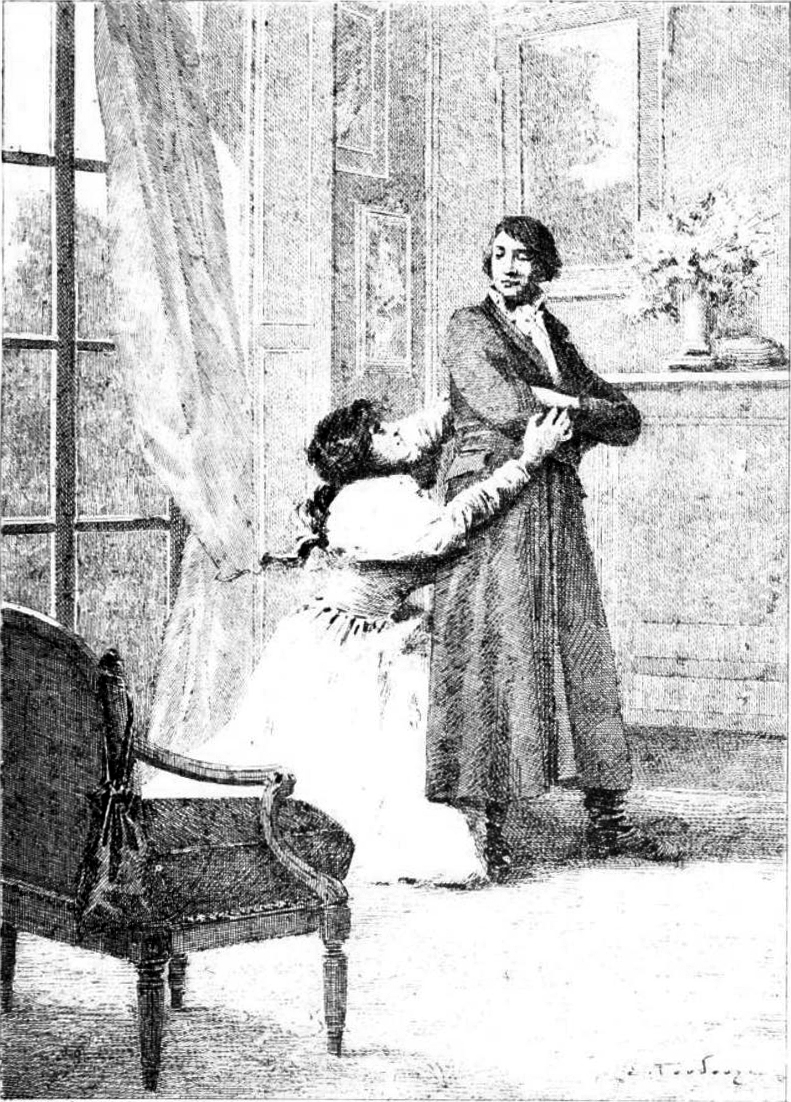
- Author: Honoré de Balzac
- Original title: Le Colonel Chabert
- Cover artist: Édouard Toudouze
- Language: French
- Series: La Comédie humaine
- Genre: Scènes de la vie privée
- Publisher: Mame-Delaunay
- Publication date: 1832
- Publication place: France
- Preceded by: Le Père Goriot
- Followed by: La Messe de l'athée

Le Colonel Chabert (English: Colonel Chabert) is an 1832 novella by French novelist and playwright Honoré de Balzac (1799–1850). It is included in his series of novels (or Roman-fleuve) known as La Comédie humaine (The Human Comedy), which depicts and parodies French society in the period of the Restoration (1815–1830) and the July Monarchy (1830–1848). This novella, originally published in Le Constitutionnel, was adapted for six different motion pictures, including two silent films.

== Plot summary ==
Colonel Chabert marries Rose Chapotel, a prostitute. Colonel Chabert then becomes a French cavalry officer who is held in high esteem by Napoleon Bonaparte. After being severely wounded in the Battle of Eylau (1807), Chabert is recorded as dead and buried with other French casualties. However, he survives and after extricating himself from his own grave is nursed back to health by local peasants. It takes several years for him to recover. Returning to Paris, he discovers his widow has married the social climber Count Ferraud and has liquidated all of Chabert's belongings. Seeking to regain his name and money that were wrongly given away as inheritance, he hires Derville, a lawyer, to win back his money and his honour. Derville, who also represents the Countess Ferraud, warns Chabert against accepting a settlement bribe from the Countess. In the end, Chabert walks away empty-handed and spends the rest of his days in an asylum.

== Themes ==
In Le Colonel Chabert Balzac juxtaposes two world-views: the Napoleonic value-system, founded on honour and military valour; and that of the Restoration. Chabert was not killed at the Battle of Eylau, though it was thought that he was. He struggles back to life, but cannot reclaim his identity. His "widow", who is actually his wife, and who fittingly was a prostitute in her early adult years, is now the Comtesse Ferraud, married (or so it would seem) to an important Restoration nobleman and politician. She repudiates her "former" husband (just as Ferraud, in changed political circumstances, would now be happy to repudiate her). All that matters in the modern era is social rank based upon the possession of money, especially inherited wealth.

This theme of the trenchant purity of the military way of life is something to which Balzac returns in La Rabouilleuse, but there the subject is treated quite differently.

== Characters ==
- Hyacinthe Chabert, Colonel
- Countess Ferraud (formerly Chabert)
- Count Ferraud
- Derville
- Bouchard
- Godeschal
- Desroches
- Simonin
- Boutin
- Chamberlain
- Delbecq
- A Notary

== Film adaptations ==
- 1911: Le Colonel Chabert. France. Directed by André Calmettes and Henri Pouctal.
- 1920: Il Colonnello Chabert. Italy. Directed by Carmine Gallone. Starring Charles Le Bargy and Rita Pergament.
- 1932: Man Without a Name (Mensch ohne Namen). Germany. Directed by Gustav Ucicky. Starring Werner Krauss, Mathias Wieman, Hans Brausewetter and Helene Thimig.
- 1943: Colonel Chabert (Le Colonel Chabert). France. Directed by René Le Hénaff. Starring Raimu.
- 1978: Colonel Chabert (Полковник Шабер). Russia. Starring Vladislav Strzhelchik, Oleg Basilashvili, Mikhail Boyarsky.
- 1994: Colonel Chabert (Le Colonel Chabert). France. Directed by Yves Angelo.

== See also ==
- Honoré de Balzac
- La Comédie humaine
- List of characters of La Comédie humaine
