= Paul Grist (actor) =

Welsh actor (1939–2026)

- Born: Paul Willis Grist; 18 January 1939; Glamorgan, Wales
- Died: 13 January 2026 (aged 86); Hertfordshire, England
- Occupations: Actor, car racer, car restorer
- Years active: 1961–1979 (film and television)

Paul Grist (18 January 1939 – 13 January 2026) was a Welsh actor, car racer and restorer.

== Life and career ==
Grist trained at the Royal Academy of Dramatic Art (RADA), being taught by Peter Barkworth and graduating in 1960.

Giving up acting in the early 1980s, Grist went on to become a restorer of vintage cars, notably Alfa Romeos and Maseratis. With his son, they raced cars at historic events.

Grist died on 13th January 2026, aged 86.

== Selected filmography ==
=== Television ===
- The Avengers (1961)
- Richard the Lionheart (1962)
- 199 Park Lane (1965)
- Emergency Ward 10 (1966)
- Triton (1968)
- The Champions (1968)
- The Jazz Age (1968)
- Pegasus (1969)
- The Doctors (1970)
- Doctor Who (1971)
- Dixon of Dock Green (1971)
- New Scotland Yard (1972)
- Perils of Pendragon (1974)
- Kidnapped (1978)
- Blake's 7 (1979)

=== Film ===
- A Stitch in Time (1963)
- San Ferry Ann (1965)
- Nobody Runs Forever (1968)
- Under Milk Wood (1971)
- Are You Being Served? (1977)

== Bibliography ==
- Ellen Baskin. Serials on British Television, 1950-1994. Scolar Press, 1996.
- Sue Parrill. Nelson's Navy in Fiction and Film: Depictions of British Sea Power in the Napoleonic Era. McFarland, 2009.
