= Battles of El Bruch =

1808 engagement of the Peninsular War

- Part of the Pеninsular War
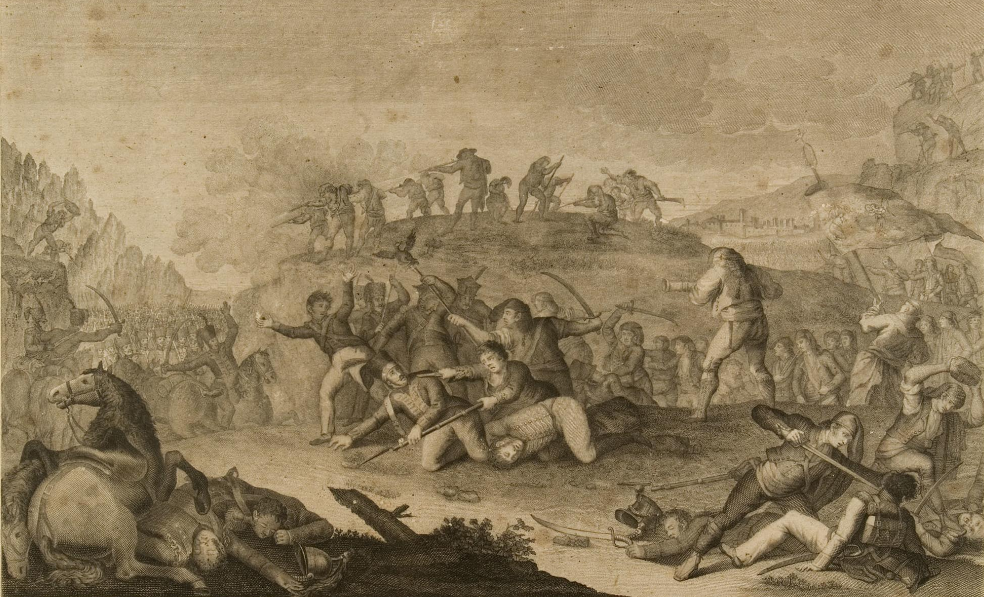
- First battle of El Bruch (engraving by José Coromina Faralt, c. 1820)
Date	6 June and 14 June 1808
Location	El Bruc, near Barcelona, Spain 41°34′48″N 1°46′49″E
Result	Spanish victory

Belligerents
France	Spain

Commanders and leaders
(First French Empire) François de Schwarz (First French Empire) Joseph Chabran	(Spain) Antoni Franch i Estalella (Spain) Joan Baiget

Strength
3,800–5,000 regulars	2,000 regulars and militia

Casualties and losses
6 June: 360 dead 800 wounded 60 captured 1 gun captured Total: 1,220; 14 June: 83 dead 274 wounded Total: 357; Grand total: 1,577	6 June: 20 dead 80 wounded Total: 100; 14 June: 15 dead 50 wounded Total: 65; Grand total: 165

Peninsular War: Spanish uprising 1808
current battle

The two battles of the Bruch (Spanish: Batallas del Bruch; Catalan: Batalles del Bruc) were engagements fought successively, at El Bruc, near Barcelona, Catalonia, on 6 and 14 June 1808, during the Peninsular War, by French troops commanded by Brigadier General François de Schwarz and General of Division Joseph Chabran against Spanish volunteers and mercenaries led by General Antoni Franch i Estalella and Joan Baget.

The result of these battles and actions was a Spanish victory.

== Background ==
The previous month's uprising in Madrid had put Iberia in revolt against French rule.

== June 6 ==
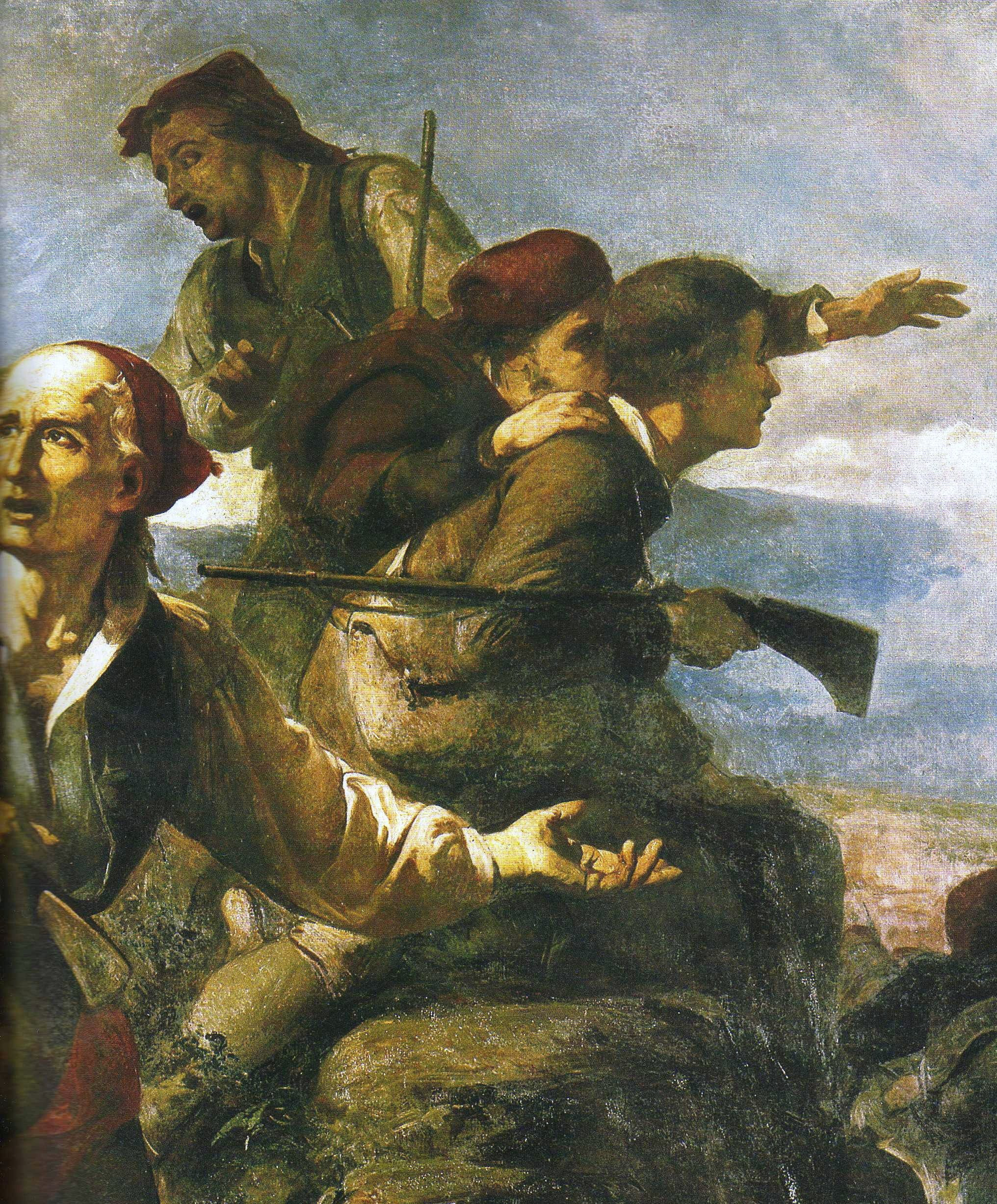
The sometent at Bruc (1880), by Ramon Martí Alsina

The French detachment of 3,800 soldiers under General of Brigade François Xavier de Schwarz left Barcelona on June 4, advancing in the direction of Lleida–Zaragoza. A rainstorm that day slowed their march considerably, giving time for local Spanish forces, composed of militia from the neighboring villages, volunteers (sometent), and Swiss and Walloon soldiers from the Barcelona garrison (2,000 men), to mobilize for action. The Spaniards were led by General Antoni Franch i Estalella and deployed along the Bruc Pass.

The resulting stand was a success, and the French under General Schwarz were turned back to Barcelona with the loss of 360 dead, 800 wounded, 60 prisoners, and one gun captured. The Spanish also captured a French Imperial Eagle.

=== French army ===
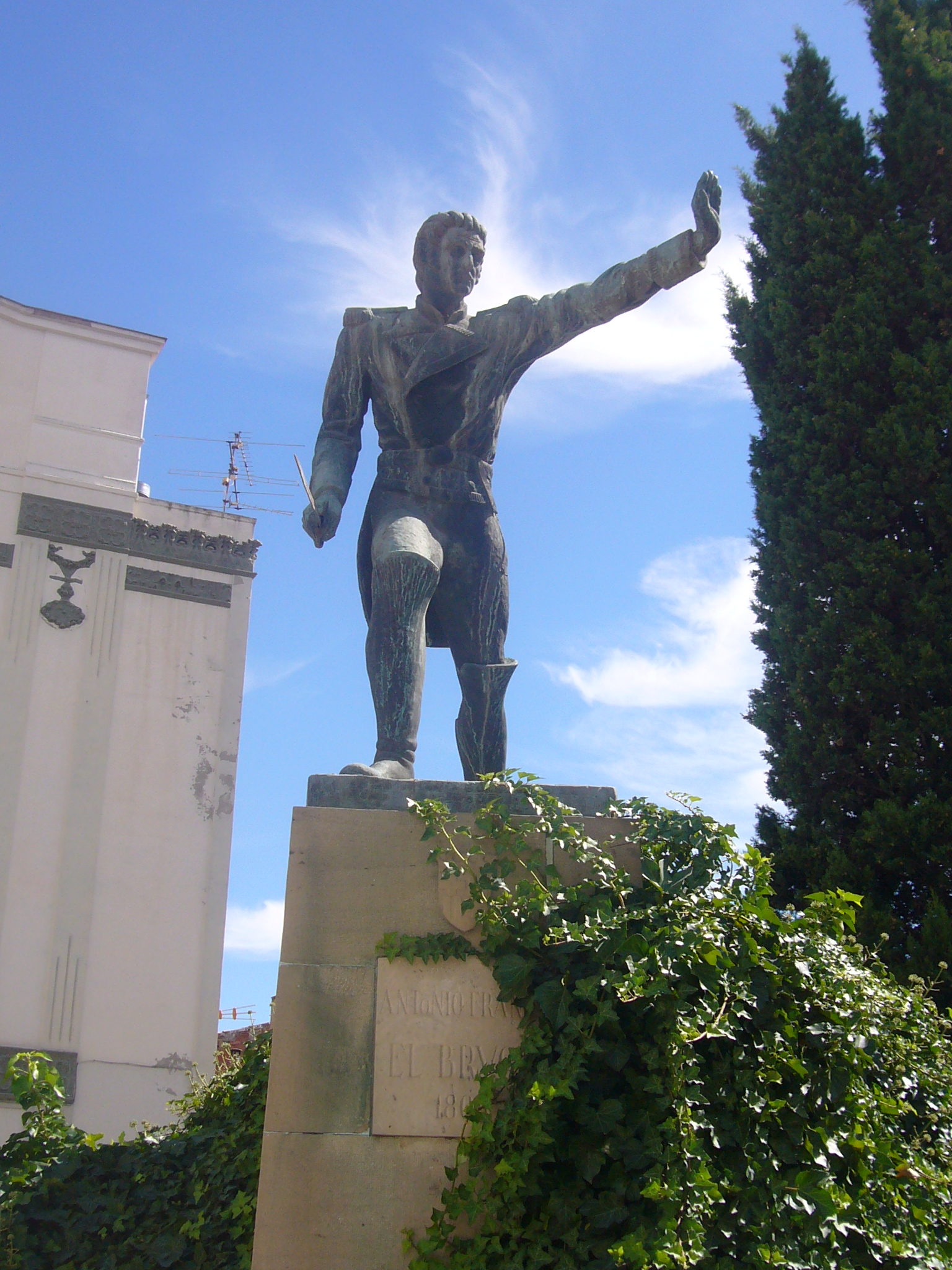
Statue of Antoni Franch i Estalella at Castells d'Igualada square

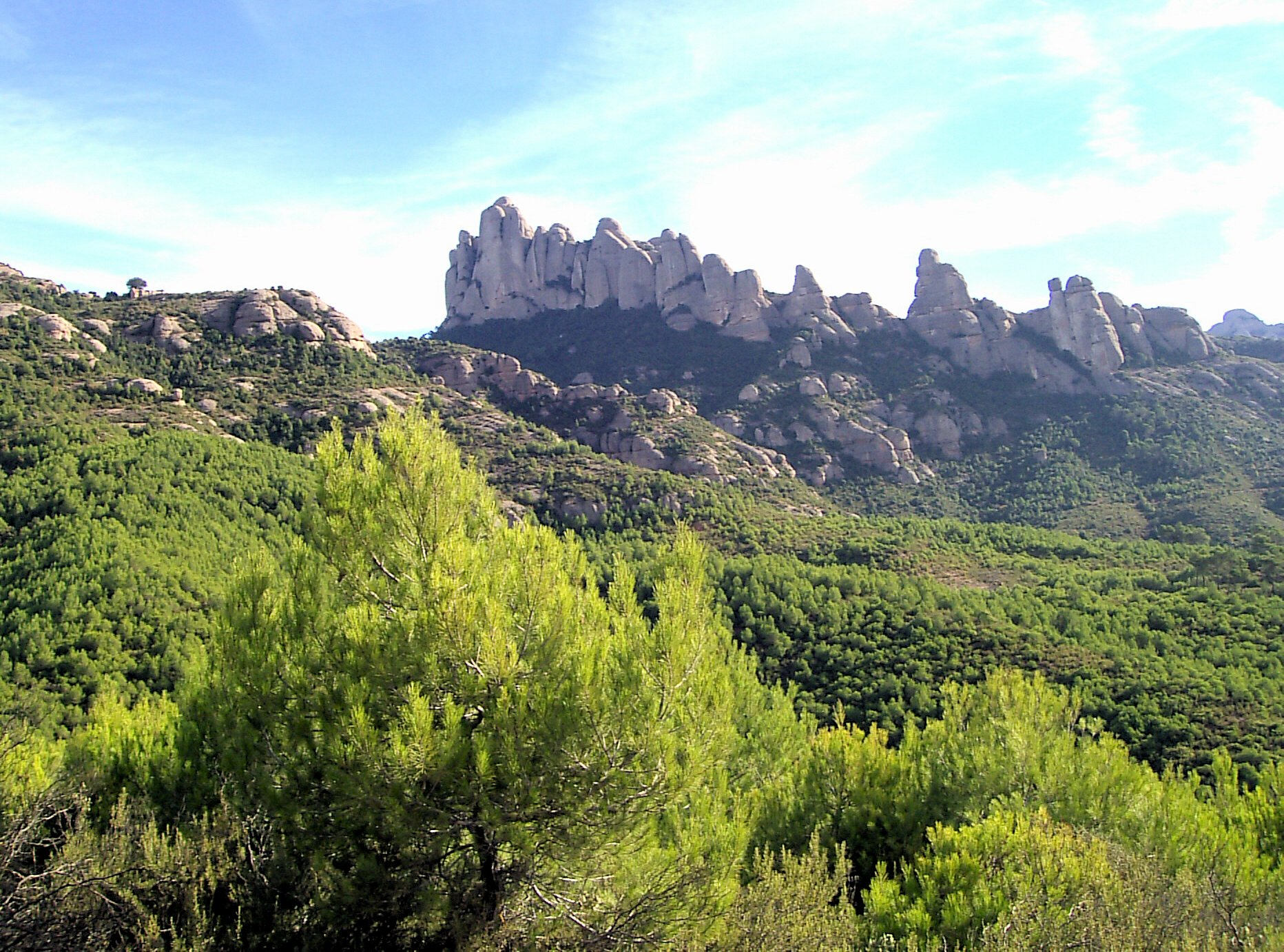
Montserrat mountains viewed from the Bruc

- Schwartz Column - Brigadier-General Francis Xavier Schwartz, Commander-in-Chief
  - 1st Regiment Neapolitan of the line (2 battalions – 1940 men)
  - 2nd Line Regiment Switzerland (3rd battalion – 580 men)
  - 2nd Regiment of the line (3rd battalion – 610 men)
  - 1st Regiment of Chasseurs Neapolitan (2 squadrons – 160 men)
  - 3rd Regiment Provisional cuirassiers (1 squadron – 100 men)
  - 11th Italian artillery company (section 1–2 guns)

=== Spanish forces ===
- General Antoni Franch i Estalella, Commander-in-Chief
  - 260 regulars and militia (Captain José Viñas)
  - 200 regulars and militia (Francesc Riera Balaguer)

== June 14 ==
A second French sortie on June 14, led by General of Division Joseph Chabran, succeeded only in putting to the torch several buildings in El Bruc after having been defeated and repelled by the Spanish forces led by Joan Baget. The following day, the Spanish attacked the French in their withdrawal to Barcelona, inflicting more than 500 dead and wounded on Chabran's troops.

=== French army ===
- First Division - General of Division Joseph Chabran, Commander-in-Chief
  - Brigade: Brigadier-General Goulas
    - 7th Regiment of the line (2 battalions – 1785 men)
    - 16th Regiment of the line (3rd battalion – 789 men)
  - Brigade: Brigadier-General Nicolas
    - 2nd Regiment of the line (3rd battalion – 610 men)
    - 37th Regiment of the line [3rd battalion – 789 men)
    - 56th Regiment of the line (4th Battalion – 833 men)
    - 93rd Regiment of the line (3rd battalion – 792 men)

=== Spanish forces ===
- Commander Joan Baget, Commander-in-Chief
  - Four companies of volunteers (soldiers of the Extremadura Regiment and militia)
  - Walloon Guards
  - Swiss regiment Wimpffen (300 men)
  - 300 militia (Antoni Franch)
  - 100 militia (Captain José Viñas)
  - Sallen residents (60 men led by the vicar Ramón Mas)
  - Patriots (100 men)
  - 5 guns

== Aftermath ==
Spain's conventional war against Napoleon's forces of occupation began with the Battles of El Bruch, 6 June 1808.

== See also ==
- Drummer of El Bruc
- Timeline of the Peninsular War

Preceded by Dos de Mayo Uprising	Napoleonic Wars; Battles of El Bruch	Succeeded by Capture of the Rosily Squadron
