= St. Ives (TV series) =

1955 British TV series

St. Ives was a television historical drama broadcast in 1955. Adapted by producer Rex Tucker from the novel of the same name by Robert Louis Stevenson, it aired on the BBC for a total of six 30-minute episodes. Cast included William Russell, Noelle Middleton, and Francis Matthews. The most notable aspect of the production is that, unlike many BBC series of the era, the episodes still exist. Later BBC television versions of the story aired in 1960 and 1967, but are believed to have been wiped.
