= Aleksey Pimanov =

Russian television presenter (1962–2026)

- Алексей Пиманов
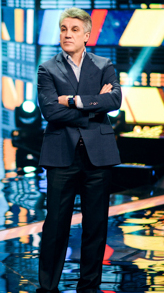
- Pimanov in 2015
- Born: 9 February 1962; Moscow, Russian SFSR, Soviet Union
- Died: 23 April 2026 (aged 64); Moscow, Russia
- Occupations: Media manager; film director; producer; screenwriter; journalist; TV presenter; politician
- Years active: 1986–2026
- Known for: Host of Man and Law
- Awards: Honored Artist of the Russian Federation (2022); Russian Federation Government Prize in Mass Media (2021); FSB Prize

Aleksey Viktorovich Pimanov (Russian: Алексей Викторович Пиманов; 9 February 1962 – 23 April 2026) was a Soviet and Russian director, screenwriter, producer, journalist, television presenter, and politician. He served as the President of JSC "Creative Association 'Krasnaya Zvezda'" (2013–2026) and was the host of the legal television program Man and Law on "ORT" / "Channel One" (1996–2026).

From 1996 to 2011, he was the General Director of the "Ostankino" television company (formerly "RTS"), which produced several programs for Channel One. He was the founder of "Pimanov and Partners" LLC and several other companies involved in the production of television programs and films. He was named an Honored Artist of the Russian Federation in 2020.

Due to his support for the Russo-Ukrainian War, he was under sanctions from all European Union countries, the United Kingdom, and several other nations.

== Life and career ==
Aleksey Pimanov was born in Moscow on 9 February 1962.

Since childhood, he dreamed of becoming a professional historian, but following the advice of his history teacher, he decided to pursue a technical education and keep history as a hobby. After graduating from secondary school, he enrolled in a technical university.

During his third year of institute, he was drafted into the Soviet Army. He served at the Baikonur Cosmodrome (Kazakh SSR), where he ensured communications prior to rocket launches. After being discharged in 1986, he continued his studies at the institute and simultaneously began working in television as a video engineer for remote cameras at the Ostankino Technical Center, and later as a cameraman.

In 1989, he graduated from the Moscow Institute of Communication with a degree in radio communication and broadcasting engineering. He also studied at the Faculty of Journalism of Moscow State University.

Pimanov died suddenly in Moscow, on 23 April 2026, at the age of 64. Preliminary reports indicated that the cause of death was heart-related; his wife later reported that the cause of death was myocardial infarction.
