= Triton (1968 TV series) =

- Genre: Historical
- Written by: Rex Tucker
- Directed by: Michael Ferguson
- Starring: Jonathan Adams; Paul Grist; Robert Cawdron
- Composer: Dudley Simpson
- Country of origin: United Kingdom
- Original language: English
- No. of series: 1
- No. of episodes: 4

Production
- Producer: John McRae
- Running time: 25 minutes
- Production company: BBC

Original release
- Network: BBC One
- Release: 30 June – 21 July 1968

Related
- Triton (1961); Pegasus

Triton is a British period television drama series which aired in four parts on BBC 1 in 1968. It is a remake of the 1961 BBC series of the same title, about two undercover Royal Navy officers attempting to discover the secret weapon with which Napoleon plans to invade England. The weapon turns out to be the submarine designed by the American inventor Robert Fulton. The series was followed by a sequel, Pegasus, in 1969.

A copy of the series exists in the archives of the British Film Institute.

== Cast ==
- Jonathan Adams as Captain Julius Belwether
- Paul Grist as Lieutenant Simon Lamb
- Robert Cawdron as Robert Fulton
- Alan Downer as Interpreter
- Maurice Browning as Marquis de St. Cloud
- Moris Farhi as French Captain
- Ric Felgate as Lieutenant Singleton
- Terry Scully as Horatio Nelson
- Hamilton Dyce as John Jervis
- Tony Boyd as Napoleon Bonaparte
- Kathleen Helme as Madame Victor

== Bibliography ==
- Ellen Baskin. Serials on British Television, 1950-1994. Scolar Press, 1996.
- Sue Parrill. Nelson's Navy in Fiction and Film: Depictions of British Sea Power in the Napoleonic Era. McFarland, 2009.
