= El Bruc =

- Municipality
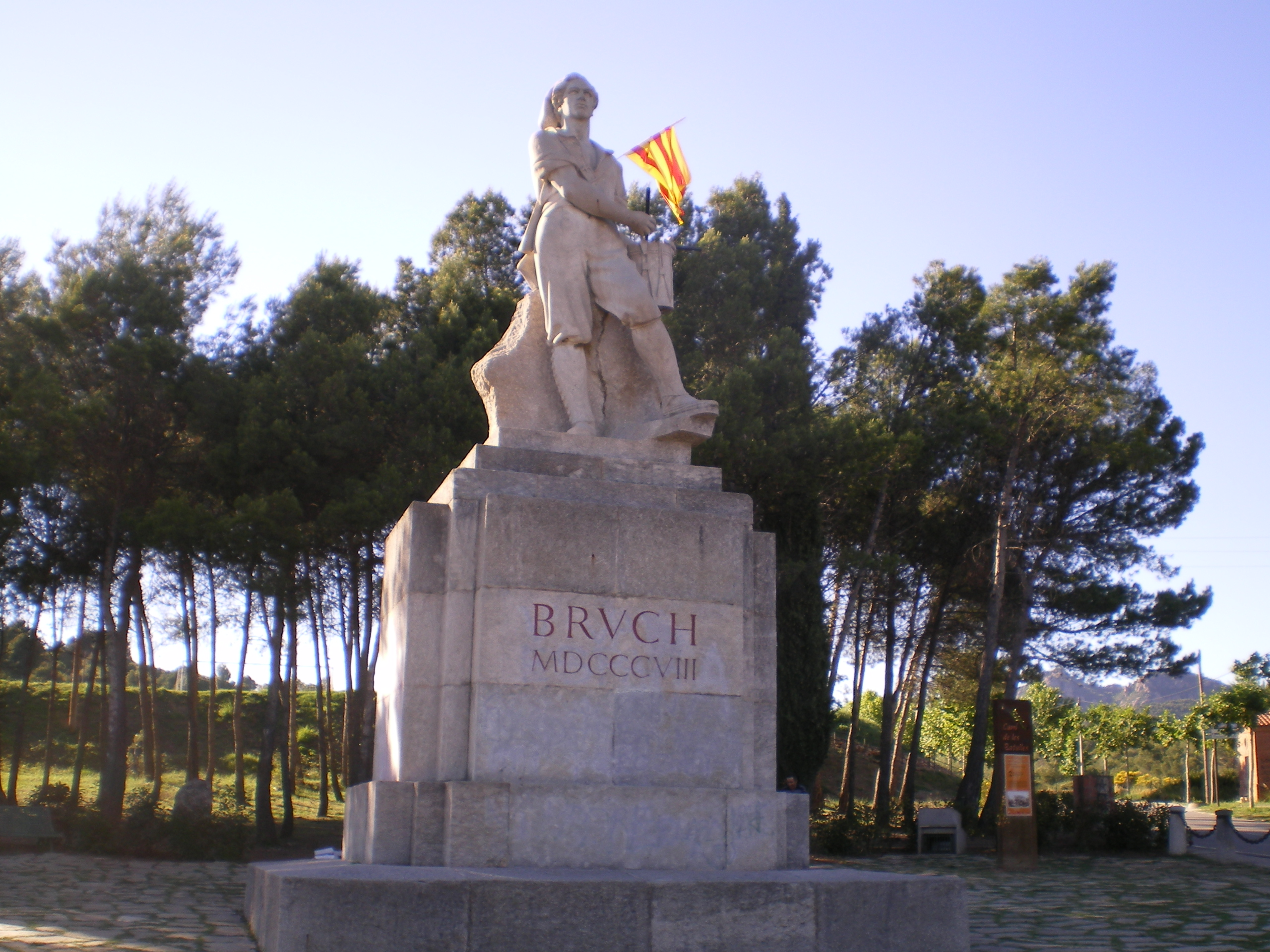
- "The Drummer" monument, el Bruc

- Coat of arms

- Location in Catalonia El Bruc (Spain)
- Coordinates: 41°34′57″N 1°46′52″E
- Country: Spain
- Community: Catalonia
- Province: Barcelona
- Comarca: Anoia

Government
  - Mayor: Enric Canela Vallès (2015)

Area
  - Total: 47.2 km^{2} (18.2 sq mi)
- Elevation: 489 m (1,604 ft)

Population (2025-01-01)
  - Total: 2,290
  - Density: 48.5/km^{2} (126/sq mi)
- Demonym(s): Bruquetà, bruquetana
- Website: www.bruc.cat

El Bruc (Catalan pronunciation: [əl ˈβɾuk]; Spanish: Bruch) is a municipality in the comarca of the Anoia in Catalonia, Spain. It is situated on the side of Montserrat, of which the north-western third is within the municipality. A local road connects the village with the main N-II road from Barcelona to Lleida, and to Monistrol de Montserrat via the monastery.

It was the site of the Battles of the Bruch between France and Spain in 1808.

== Demography ==
1900	1930	1950	1970	1986	2007
1186	1053	798	774	707	1743
