= The Cats' Bridge =

1889 novel by Hermann Sudermann

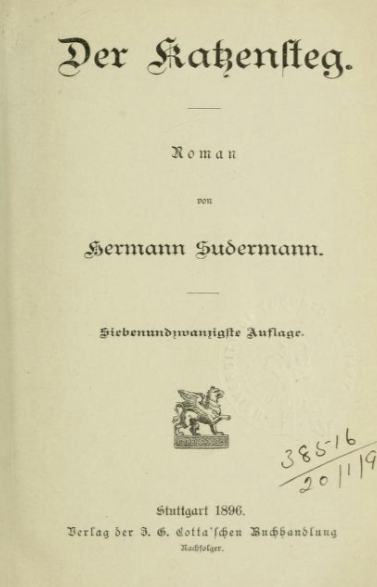
- Title page for The Cats' Bridge (1896)
- Author: Hermann Sudermann
- Original title: Der Katzensteg
- Translator: Beatrice Marshall
- Language: German
- Publisher: Frankfurter Societäts-druckerei
- Publication date: 1889
- Publication place: Germany
- English publication date: 1898
- Pages: 184

The Cats' Bridge (German: Der Katzensteg) is an 1889 novel by the German writer Hermann Sudermann. It was published in English in 1898 as Regina, or The Sins of the Fathers, translated by Beatrice Marshall.

== Film adaptations ==
The novel has been adapted for film multiple times:

- 1913: Der Katzensteg, directed by Alfred Halm
- 1915: Der Katzensteg, directed by Max Mack
- 1927: The Catwalk, directed by Gerhard Lamprecht
- 1937: Cat Walk, directed by Fritz Peter Buch
- 1944: El Camino de los gatos, directed by Chano Urueta
- 1975: Der Katzensteg, directed by Peter Meincke
