= Triton (1961 TV series) =

- Genre: Historical
- Written by: Rex Tucker
- Directed by: Rex Tucker
- Starring: William Russell; Francis Matthews; Reed De Rouen
- Country of origin: United Kingdom
- Original language: English
- No. of series: 1
- No. of episodes: 4

Production
- Producer: Rex Tucker
- Running time: 30 minutes
- Production company: BBC

Original release
- Network: BBC One
- Release: 4 June – 25 June 1961

Triton is a British period television drama series which aired in four parts on BBC 1 in 1961. Set during the Napoleonic Wars, two Royal Navy officers go on an undercover mission to France discover Napoleon's secret weapon for his planned invasion of Britain. It turns out to be the submarine designed by the American Robert Fulton for the French Navy in 1800.

It was written, produced and directed by Rex Tucker. Unlike many BBC programmes of the early 60s, it is believed all four episodes have survived. In 1968 the story was remade by the BBC in another four part serial of the same title, which also exists with the British Film Institute.

== Main cast ==
- William Russell as Captain Belwether
- Francis Matthews as Lieutenant Lamb
- Reed De Rouen as Robert Fulton
- Robert James as Lord Nelson
- Anthony Sharp as Sir Home Popham
- Selma Vaz Dias as Madame Victor
- Michael Anthony as Interpreter
- Jacques Cey as French Captain
- Roger Delgado as The Man with the Patch

== Bibliography ==
- Ellen Baskin. Serials on British Television, 1950-1994. Scolar Press, 1996.
- Sue Parrill. Nelson's Navy in Fiction and Film: Depictions of British Sea Power in the Napoleonic Era. McFarland, 2009.
