= Pegasus (TV series) =

British television series

- Genre: Historical
- Written by: Rex Tucker
- Directed by: Michael Ferguson
- Starring: Jonathan Adams; Paul Grist; Robert Cawdron
- Composer: Dudley Simpson
- Country of origin: United Kingdom
- Original language: English
- No. of series: 1
- No. of episodes: 4

Production
- Producer: John McRae
- Running time: 25 minutes
- Production company: BBC

Original release
- Network: BBC One
- Release: 17 November – 8 December 1969

Related
- Triton

Pegasus is a British period television drama series which aired in four parts on BBC 1 in 1969. It is a sequel of the 1968 series Triton which focused on two British naval officers battling a Napoleonic plot to invade Britain with the aid of submarines. In the sequel the two officers return to try and foil a ploy to use hot air balloons to bombard the naval base at Portsmouth at the time of Trafalgar.

== Principal cast ==
- Jonathan Adams as Captain Julius Belwether
- Paul Grist as Lieutenant Simon Lamb
- Robert Cawdron as Robert Fulton
- John Abineri as Louis Rene Lavassoir Latouche
- Kynaston Reeves as Lord Barham
- Tony Caunter as Sir William Congreve
- Terry Scully as Lord Nelson

== Bibliography ==
- Ellen Baskin. Serials on British Television, 1950-1994. Scolar Press, 1996.
- Sue Parrill. Nelson's Navy in Fiction and Film: Depictions of British Sea Power in the Napoleonic Era. McFarland, 2009.
