= Carlo Alberto Chiesa =

Italian film editor, screenwriter and film director

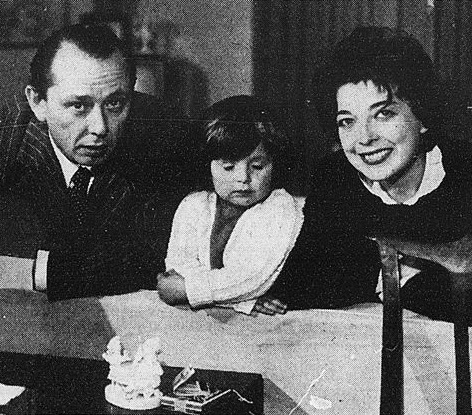
- Carlo Alberto Chiesa, his wife Isa Barzizza and their daughter Carlotta
- Born: 27 December 1922; Turin, Piedmont, Italy
- Died: 3 June 1960 (aged 37); Rome, Lazio, Italy
- Occupation(s): Director; Editor; Screenwriter

Carlo Alberto Chiesa (1922–1960) was an Italian screenwriter, film editor and director. In 1945 he edited Luchino Visconti's docu-drama Days of Glory. He spent much of his later career directing commercials, his one feature film as director was the 1951 comedy The Two Sergeants (1951).

== Selected filmography ==
=== Director ===
- The Two Sergeants (1951)

=== Editor ===
- Days of Glory (1945)

=== Screenwriter ===
- Songs in the Streets (1950)
- The Two Sergeants (1951)
- The Devil's Cavaliers (1959)
