= The Secret of St. Ives =

1949 film by Phil Rosen

- Directed by: Phil Rosen (as Philip Rosen)
- Screenplay by: Eric Taylor
- Based on: St. Ives by Robert Louis Stevenson
- Produced by: Rudolph C. Flothow
- Starring: Richard Ney; Vanessa Brown; Henry Daniell
- Cinematography: Henry Freulich
- Edited by: James Sweeney
- Production company: Columbia Pictures
- Distributed by: Columbia Pictures
- Release date: June 30, 1949
- Running time: 75 minutes
- Country: United States
- Language: English

The Secret of St. Ives is a 1949 American historical adventure film directed by Phil Rosen and starring Richard Ney, Vanessa Brown and Henry Daniell. It is adapted from the 1897 novel St. Ives by Robert Louis Stevenson. Set during the Napoleonic Wars, the film's plot follows a French officer who is captured and held as a prisoner in England. He manages to escape with the help of a local woman. The film was released by Columbia Pictures. The sets were designed by the art director Cary Odell.

== Plot ==
Adaptation of the Robert Louis Stevenson's story of French prisoners in the Napoleonic wars who escape from Edinburgh Castle.

== Cast ==
- Richard Ney as Anatole de Keroual
- Vanessa Brown as Floria Gilchrist
- Henry Daniell as Maj. Edward Chevenish
- Edgar Barrier as Sgt. Carnac
- Aubrey Mather as Daniel Romaine
- Luis Van Rooten as Clausel
- John Dehner as Couguelat
- Paul Marion as Amiot
- Douglas Walton as Allan St. Ives
- Jean Del Val as Count St. Ives
- Phyllis Morris as Annie Gilchrist
- John Goldsworthy as General Ordney
- Gordon Richards as Prosecution Officer

== Bibliography ==
- Goble, Alan. The Complete Index to Literary Sources in Film. Walter de Gruyter, 1999.
