= The Two Sergeants (1936 film) =

1936 film by Enrico Guazzoni

- Directed by: Enrico Guazzoni
- Written by: Carlo Bernari; Gherardo Gherardi; Paolo Lorenzini; Nunzio Malasomma
- Based on: The Two Sergeants by Theodore d'Aubigny
- Produced by: Pietro Mander
- Starring: Evi Maltagliati; Gino Cervi; Mino Doro; Luisa Ferida
- Cinematography: Arturo Gallea; Augusto Tiezzi
- Edited by: Gino Talamo
- Music by: Pietro Clausetti; Alessandro Cicognini
- Production company: Manderfilm
- Distributed by: Manderfilm
- Release date: 1936
- Running time: 93 minutes
- Country: Italy
- Language: Italian

The Two Sergeants (Italian: I due sergenti) is a 1936 Italian historical drama film directed by Enrico Guazzoni and starring Evi Maltagliati, Gino Cervi and Mino Doro. It was based on the play The Two Sergeants by Theodore d'Aubigny, which has been made into films several times. It is set in the Napoleonic Wars. The film marked the debut of Alida Valli who had until recently been a student of the Centro sperimentale di cinematografia. Valli went on to be a leading star of Italian cinema.

The film was shot at the Pisorno Studios in Tirrenia and on location in Tuscany. The sets were designed by Virgilio Marchi, a noted architect who worked for many years in the film industry.

== Main cast ==
- Evi Maltagliati as Marilyne Gould
- Gino Cervi as Il comandente Federico Martelli/Il sergente Guglielmo Salvoni
- Mino Doro as Il sergente Roberto Magni
- Luisa Ferida as Lauretta Fracassa
- Ugo Ceseri as Il caporale Fracassa
- Antonio Centa as Il luogotenente Carlo Duval/Il colonnello Georges Masson
- Nella Maria Bonora as Anna Martelli
- Lamberto Picasso as Lacroix
- Vera Dani as Pia Martelli
- Margherita Bagni as Luisa
- Enzo Biliotti as Howe
- Tatiana Pavoni as Madame Jeannette
- Matilde Casagrande as Una commessa dell'emporio 'Au Bon Marché'
- Ivana Diani as Una commessa dell'emporio 'Au Bon Marché'
- Titti Leinmüller as Una commessa dell'emporio 'Au Bon Marché'
- Giuliana Gianni as Una commessa dell'emporio 'Au Bon Marché'
- Jole Tinta as Una commessa dell'emporio 'Au Bon Marché'
- Alida Valli as Una commessa dell'emporio 'Au Bon Marché'
- Valentino Bruchi as Gravel
- Emilio Petacci as Il colonnello
- Nicola Maldacea as Un veterano
- Giovanna Scotto as La madre arrestata nella foresta
- Umberto Casilini as Ferroni, il notario
- Nico Pepe as L'ufficiale amoroso
