= The Two Sergeants (play) =

Play by Théodore Baudouin d'Aubigny

The Two Sergeants (French:Les Deux Sergents) is an 1823 play by the French writer Théodore Baudouin d'Aubigny. It is a melodrama set during the Napoleonic Wars. Numerous versions were made of it including an 1831 British play Comrades and Friends by Isaac Pocock and an Italian novel.

== Film adaptations ==
The play has been made into four films:

- The Two Sergeants (1913 film), an Italian silent film directed by Eugenio Perego
- The Two Sergeants (1922 film), an Italian silent film directed by Guido Brignone
- The Two Sergeants (1936 film), an Italian film directed by Enrico Guazzoni
- The Two Sergeants (1951 film), an Italian film directed by Carlo Alberto Chiesa

== Bibliography ==
- Nicoll, Allardyce. A History of English Drama 1660-1690. Cambridge University Press, 2009.
