= Colonel Chabert (1994 film) =

- Film poster
- Directed by: Yves Angelo
- Screenplay by: Yves Angelo; Jean Cosmos; Véronique Lagrange
- Based on: Le Colonel Chabert by Honoré de Balzac
- Produced by: Jean-Louis Livi
- Starring: Gérard Depardieu; Fanny Ardant; Fabrice Luchini; André Dussollier
- Cinematography: Bernard Lutic
- Edited by: Thierry Derocles
- Distributed by: AMLF
- Release date: 21 September 1994
- Running time: 110 minutes
- Country: France
- Language: French
- Budget: $13.4 million
- Box office: $13.2 million

Le Colonel Chabert (English title: Colonel Chabert) is a 1994 French historical drama film directed by Yves Angelo and starring Gérard Depardieu, Fanny Ardant and Fabrice Luchini. It is based on the novel Le Colonel Chabert by Honoré de Balzac. It is the sixth film adaptation of Balzac's novel.

== Synopsis ==
In Paris, in February 1817, three years after the fall of the Empire, the lawyer Derville receives a visit from a shabbily dressed man. He claims to be Colonel Chabert, believed dead at the Battle of Eylau in 1807. He had contributed to the victory by leading a famous cavalry charge against the Russians.

The man tells how, waking in a mass grave surrounded by corpses, he survived his wounds.

He has returned ten years later and wishes to claim his title, to assert his rights and to live again with his wife, who has greatly increased the fortune she inherited from him. She, during his absence, has married Count Ferraud and had children.

She refuses to recognise her first husband. Derville agrees to help the colonel by proposing a settlement in which she will make a large settlement on Chabert if he agrees to divorce her and give up his claims. She refuses the proposed terms and tries to manipulate her ex-husband, asking him to declare his claim is fraudulent. Chabert, disgusted by her deceitfulness and the idea of him renouncing his name, abandons his claim.

Colonel Chabert finishes his life penniless and in an asylum, reminiscing on his last battle.

== Cast ==
- Gérard Depardieu : Amédé Chabert
- Fabrice Luchini : Maître Derville
- Fanny Ardant : Countess Ferraud
- André Dussollier : Count Ferraud
- Daniel Prévost : Boucard
- Olivier Saladin : Huré
- Maxime Leroux : Godeschal
- Éric Elmosnino : Maître Desroches
- Guillaume Romain : Simonin
- Patrick Bordier : Boutin
- Claude Rich : Chamblin
- Jean Cosmos : Costaz
- Jacky Nercessian : Delbecq
- Albert Delpy : Maître Roguin
- Romane Bohringer : Sophie
- Valérie Bettencourt : Julie
- Julie Depardieu : A maid

== Production ==
- Direction : Yves Angelo, assisted by Frédéric Blum
- Script : Yves Angelo, Jean Cosmos and Véronique Lagrange, from the novel by Honoré de Balzac
- Production : Jean-Louis Livi and Bernard Marescot
- Music : Régis Pasquier
- Photography : Bernard Lutic
- Editing : Thierry Derocles
- Scenery : Bernard Vézat (certain interior scenes filmed at Château de Bizy in Vernon, Eure)
- Costumes : Franca Squarciapino

== Filming locations ==
- Château de Champs-sur-Marne (Seine-et-Marne)
- Château de Bizy (Vernon, Eure)
- Château de Bouges (Indre)

== Awards and nominations ==
- Cairo Film Festival (Egypt)
  - Won: Golden Pyramid (Yves Angelo)
- César Awards (France)
  - Nominated: Best Actor – Leading Role (Gérard Depardieu)
  - Nominated: Best Actor – Supporting Role (Fabrice Luchini)
  - Nominated: Best Cinematography (Bernard Lutic)
  - Nominated: Best Costume Design (Franca Squarciapino)
  - Nominated: Best First Work (Yves Angelo)
  - Nominated: Best Production Design (Bernard Vézat)
