= St. Ives (novel) =

Unfinished novel by Robert Louis Stevenson

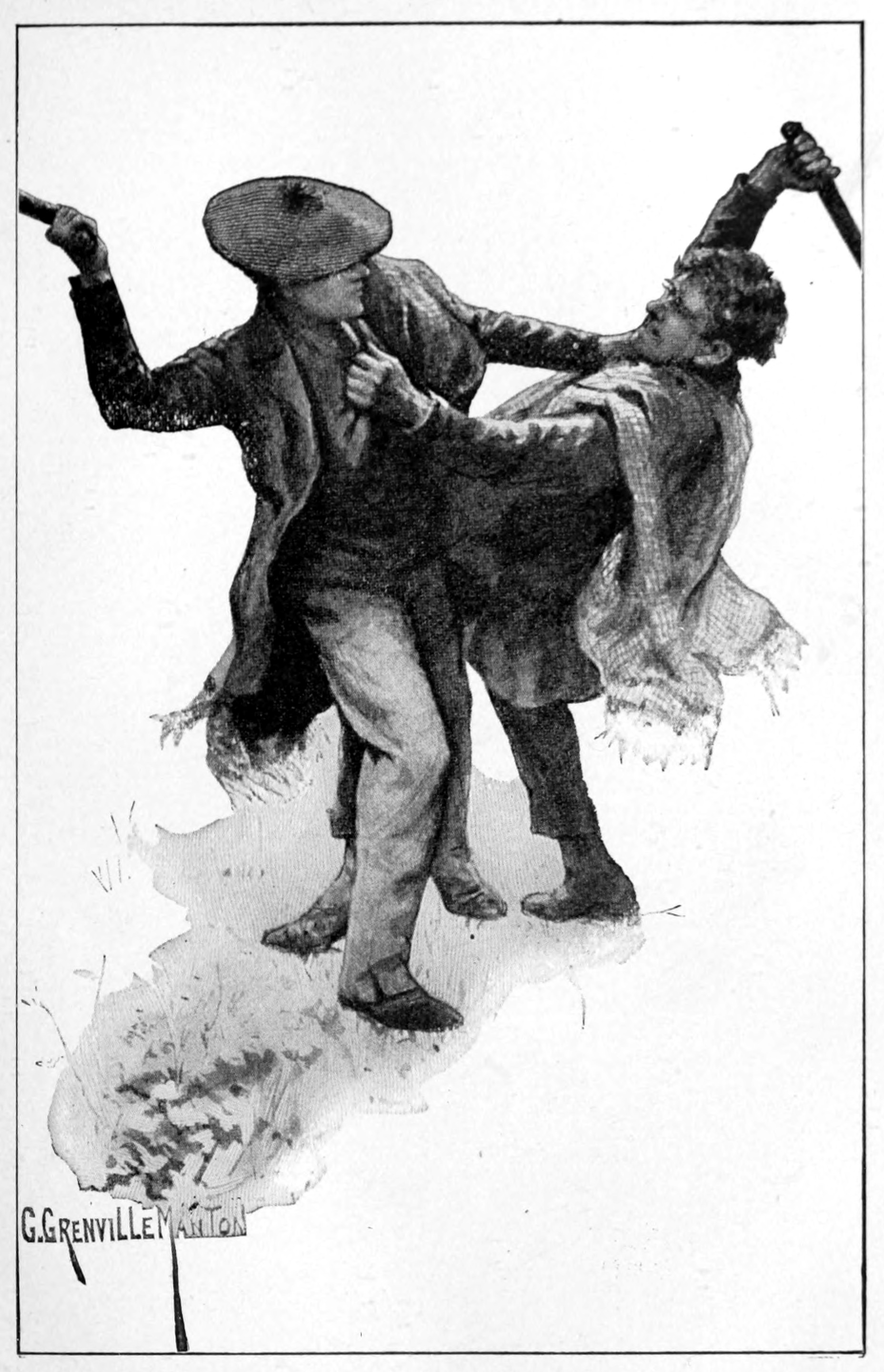
- "The rogue that fell to my share was exceedingly agile."
- Author: Robert Louis Stevenson
- Illustrator: George Grenville Manton
- Language: English
- Genre: Novel
- Publisher: Scribner's
- Publication date: 1897
- Publication place: Scotland
- Media type: Print (Hardback & Paperback)
- Text: St. Ives at Wikisource

St. Ives: Being The Adventures of a French Prisoner in England (1897) is an unfinished novel by Robert Louis Stevenson. It was completed in 1898 by Arthur Quiller-Couch.

Unable to write, Stevenson dictated thirty chapters of the novel to his stepdaughter as a diversion from his debilitating illness. He alternated dictating St. Ives and The Weir of Hermiston but gradually lost interest in the former.

The book plot concerns the adventures of the dashing Viscomte Anne de Keroual de St. Ives, a Napoleonic soldier enlisted as a private under the name Champdivers, after his capture by the British.

== Film adaptations ==
The 1949 film The Secret of St. Ives and the 1998 film St. Ives, also known as All For Love, were based on the novel. A television mini-series based on the novel was broadcast on the BBC in 1955.
