= Rex Tucker =

British television director (1913–1996)

Rex Tucker (20 February 1913 – 10 August 1996) was a British television director in the 1950s and 1960s.

== Early life ==
He was born in March in the Isle of Ely, Cambridgeshire. He attended Cheltenham Grammar School and Jesus College, Cambridge.

== Career ==
Tucker joined the BBC in 1937 to work in radio where he remained for several years before moving to TV work. In 1954 Tucker wrote and directed The Three Princes which featured future Doctor Who producer Barry Letts and actor Roger Delgado who later became well known for playing the Doctor's opponent The Master. In 1961 he wrote, produced and directed the historical serial Triton, which was remade in 1968. Tucker also wrote a sequel Pegasus for broadcast in 1969.

Amongst his work, he was a driving force during the formative stages of Doctor Who in 1963, acting as a caretaker producer prior to the arrival of Verity Lambert. Tucker's friend, the actor and director Hugh David — whom Tucker had actually approached about playing the leading role in the series — later claimed in interviews that it was Tucker who had named the series Doctor Who, although Tucker himself credited Sydney Newman with this. Tucker was also the director originally assigned to the first serial, An Unearthly Child, and later it had been planned that Tucker would direct more of the programme's introductory season. However, these commitments did not work out, and ultimately he directed only The Gunfighters in 1966. During the last episode, The O.K. Corral, a dispute arose between Tucker and then producer Innes Lloyd over the editing of the episode, leading to Tucker requesting that his credit be excised.

In 2013 the BBC commissioned a docudrama about the creation and early days of Doctor Who, called An Adventure in Space and Time, as part of the programme's fiftieth anniversary celebrations. Tucker appears as a character in the drama, played by actor Andrew Woodall.

His daughter Jane Tucker was part of the Rod, Jane and Freddy musical trio.
