= St. Ives (1998 film) =

- International DVD cover
- Genre: Costume drama
- Based on: St. Ives by Robert Louis Stevenson
- Screenplay by: Allan Cubitt
- Directed by: Harry Hook
- Starring: Jean-Marc Barr; Miranda Richardson; Anna Friel; Richard E. Grant
- Theme music composer: John E. Keane
- Countries of origin: France; Germany; Ireland; United Kingdom
- Original language: English

Production
- Producers: Jonathan Cavendish; James Mitchell
- Cinematography: Robert Alazraki
- Editor: John MacDonnell
- Running time: 83 minutes
- Production companies: Compagnie des Phares et Balises; Icon Productions; Little Bird; Tatfilm

Original release
- Release: 22 October 1998

St. Ives (released under the name All for Love in the UK) is a 1998 television film based on the unfinished Robert Louis Stevenson novel of the same name. The film stars Miranda Richardson, Anna Friel, Richard E. Grant and Jean-Marc Barr.

== Plot ==
A dashing French Army officer, capitaine Jacques de Keroual de Saint-Yves, is captured by the British during the Napoleonic Wars and sent to a Scottish prison camp. There he falls for a local girl, befriends the commanding officer, and discovers a surprising secret about his long-lost grandfather.

== Cast ==
- Jean-Marc Barr as Captain Jacques de Keroual de Saint-Yves
- Miranda Richardson as Susan Gilchrist
- Richard E. Grant as Major Farquhar Chevening
- Anna Friel as Flora Gilchrist
- Michael Gough as Comte de Saint-Yves
- Cécile Pallas as Mathilde
- Jason Isaacs as Alain de Keroual de Saint-Yves

== Production ==
The film was shot in Northern Ireland.

== Reception ==
DVDTalk gave it a rating of 1 out of 5, and said it "feels like a made-for-television special" and "I'm normally enthusiastic about historically-based movies, even flawed ones. St. Ives is more than flawed; it's dull and insipid." The Radio Times gave it 2 out of 5. The Guardian said it was no classic, but asked does it matter "because costume drama is already the ultimate TV genre [...] it has always been able to demonstrate a reassuringly pantomime take on all other forms of television entertainment."

On Rotten Tomatoes the film has two reviews, both negative.
