= The Two Sergeants (1951 film) =

- A poster for the film
- Directed by: Carlo Alberto Chiesa
- Written by: Daniele D'Anza; Mario Landi; Vincenzo Rovi; Giulio Scarnicci; Renzo Tarabusi; Carlo Alberto Chiesa
- Produced by: Franco Cancellieri
- Starring: Mario Carotenuto; Antonella Lualdi; Beniamino Maggio; Franca Valeri
- Cinematography: Massimo Dallamano
- Edited by: Loris Bellero
- Music by: Lelio Luttazzi
- Production company: Produzione Cinematografica Cancellieri
- Distributed by: Produzione Cinematografica Cancellieri
- Release date: 1951
- Running time: 76 minutes
- Country: Italy
- Language: Italian

The Two Sergeants (Italian:I Due sergenti) is a 1951 Italian comedy film directed by Carlo Alberto Chiesa and starring Mario Carotenuto, Antonella Lualdi and Beniamino Maggio. It is one of several film adaptations of the 1823 play The Two Sergeants. The film updated the historic story of two idlers who steal some military uniforms and become mistaken for real soldiers.

== Cast ==
- Antonella Lualdi
- Mario Carotenuto
- Adriana Serra
- Franca Valeri
- Franco Scandurra
- Luciano Tajoli
- Nunzio Filogamo
- Guglielmo Barnabò
- Mario Castellani
- Elena Giusti
- Beniamino Maggio
- Marisa Merlini
- Adriano Rimoldi
- Cesare Canevari
- Pina Renzi
