= The Two Sergeants (1913 film) =

1913 film by Eugenio Perego

- Directed by: Eugenio Perego
- Written by: Théodore Baudouin d'Aubigny (play); Eugenio Perego
- Produced by: Ernesto Maria Pasquali
- Starring: Alberto Capozzi; Umberto Paradisi; Orlando Ricci
- Production company: Pasquali Film
- Distributed by: Pasquali Film
- Release date: 11 July 1913
- Running time: 67 minutes
- Country: Italy
- Languages: Silent; Italian intertitles

The Two Sergeants (Italian: I due sergenti) is a 1913 Italian silent drama film directed by Eugenio Perego and starring Alberto Capozzi, Umberto Paradisi and Orlando Ricci. It is an adaptation of Théodore Baudouin d'Aubigny's 1823 play of the same title, which has been made into several films. It is set during the Napoleonic Wars.

== Cast ==
- Alberto Capozzi as Capitano Derville / Guglielmo
- Umberto Paradisi as Sergente Roberto
- Orlando Ricci as Maresciallo
- Egidio Candiani as Valentino
- Giovanni Cuisa as Servente Tomasso
- Giovanni Enrico Vidali as Aiutante Valmore
- Michele Cuisa as Gustavo
- Maria Gandini as Mamma Pia
- Laura Darville
- Cristina Ruspoli
- Emilia Vidali

== Bibliography ==
- Riccardo Redi. Cinema muto italiano: 1896-1930. Fondazione Scuola nazionale di cinema, 1999.
