= Battle of Cardedeu order of battle =

Battle of Cardedeu
- Part of Peninsular War
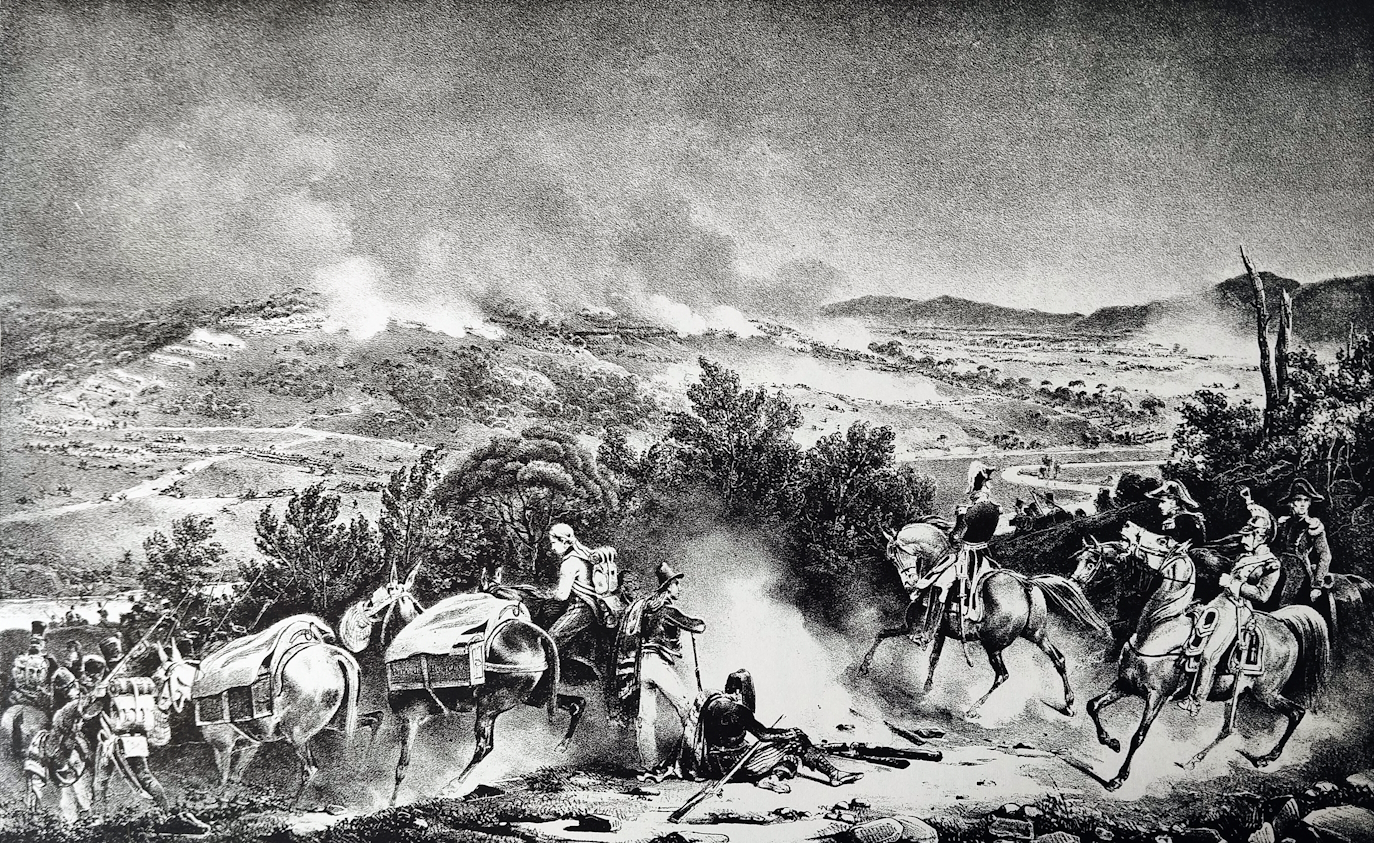
- Victory in the Battle of Cardedeu allowed the French to break through to Barcelona in December 1808.
Date	Battle: 16 December 1808; Campaign: June–December 1808
Location	Catalonia, Spain
Result	French victory

Belligerents
(France) First French Empire (Kingdom of Italy (Napoleonic)) Kingdom of Italy; Kingdom of Naples (Switzerland) Swiss Confederation	Kingdom of Spain

Commanders and leaders
(France) Guillaume Duhesme (France) Laurent Saint-Cyr	(Spain) Juan Miguel de Vives (Spain) Theodor von Reding

Strength
over 42,382	unknown

The Cardedeu order of battle lists the troops that fought in the Battle of Cardedeu (16 December 1808) and several other battles fought between June and December in the Spanish province of Catalonia during the Peninsular War. In February 1808, Imperial French forces seized Barcelona on 29 February and Sant Ferran Castle on 15 March as well as other fortresses in Spain. The Dos de Mayo Uprising broke out when the Spanish people found that Emperor Napoleon had deposed the Spanish royal family and set up his brother Joseph Bonaparte as their new king. The 12,000 Imperial French soldiers under Guillaume Philibert Duhesme occupying Catalonia were beaten at the Battles of El Bruch and Gerona the following June. Though Duhesme was reinforced by another French division, the Spanish defeated him again at the Second Siege of Gerona in July and August. With Duhesme blockaded in Barcelona, Napoleon appointed Laurent Gouvion Saint-Cyr as commander of the VII Corps, added two divisions and other troops to his force, and ordered him to relieve Barcelona. Saint-Cyr succeeded in this task, as well as winning at Roses, Cardedeu and Molins de Rei in December.

== Imperial French order of battle ==
On 10 October 1808, the VII Corps numbered 42,382 soldiers, of whom 4,948 men were in the hospital and 1,302 were detached. However, not all its assigned troops had joined by that date. Note that the Observation Corps became part of VII Corps when Saint-Cyr assumed command. It is probable that the corps counted over 50,000 men. Joseph Chabran's division was made up of veteran French units. The Provisional Cavalry regiments were created by assembling the depot squadrons, all conscripts, from as many as four different regiments. Honoré Charles Reille's division was a mass of second-class units cobbled together from National Guards, provisional battalions, Swiss, and a "French" regiment from recently annexed Tuscany. The Neapolitans were universally considered the worst troops in Europe. On the other hand, the divisions of Joseph Souham and Domenico Pino were composed of crack troops.

VII Corps of General Laurent Gouvion Saint-Cyr on 10 October 1808
Corps	Division	Strength	Unit	Strength
Observation Corps; General of Division; Guillaume Philibert Duhesme	1st Division; General of Division; Joseph Chabran	Aug: 6,045	(France) 2nd Line Infantry Regiment, 3rd Battalion	610
Observation Corps; General of Division; Guillaume Philibert Duhesme	1st Division; General of Division; Joseph Chabran	Aug: 6,045	(France) 7th Line Infantry Regiment, 1st & 2nd Battalions	1,785
Observation Corps; General of Division; Guillaume Philibert Duhesme	1st Division; General of Division; Joseph Chabran	Aug: 6,045	(France) 16th Line Infantry Regiment, 3rd Battalion	789
Observation Corps; General of Division; Guillaume Philibert Duhesme	1st Division; General of Division; Joseph Chabran	Aug: 6,045	(France) 37th Line Infantry Regiment, 3rd Battalion	656
Observation Corps; General of Division; Guillaume Philibert Duhesme	1st Division; General of Division; Joseph Chabran	Aug: 6,045	(France) 56th Line Infantry Regiment, 4th Battalion	833
Observation Corps; General of Division; Guillaume Philibert Duhesme	1st Division; General of Division; Joseph Chabran	Aug: 6,045	(France) 93rd Line Infantry Regiment, 3rd Battalion	792
Observation Corps; General of Division; Guillaume Philibert Duhesme	1st Division; General of Division; Joseph Chabran	Aug: 6,045	(Switzerland) 2nd Swiss Infantry Regiment, 3rd Battalion	580
Observation Corps; General of Division; Guillaume Philibert Duhesme	2nd Division; General of Division; Giuseppe Lechi	Aug: 4,596	(Kingdom of Italy (Napoleonic)) 2nd Italian Line Infantry Regiment, 2nd Battalion	740
Observation Corps; General of Division; Guillaume Philibert Duhesme	2nd Division; General of Division; Giuseppe Lechi	Aug: 4,596	(Kingdom of Italy (Napoleonic)) 4th Italian Line Infantry Regiment, 3rd Battalion	587
Observation Corps; General of Division; Guillaume Philibert Duhesme	2nd Division; General of Division; Giuseppe Lechi	Aug: 4,596	(Kingdom of Italy (Napoleonic)) 5th Italian Line Infantry Regiment, 2nd Battalion	806
Observation Corps; General of Division; Guillaume Philibert Duhesme	2nd Division; General of Division; Giuseppe Lechi	Aug: 4,596	(Kingdom of Italy (Napoleonic)) Italian Velites Infantry Regiment, 1st Battalion	519
Observation Corps; General of Division; Guillaume Philibert Duhesme	2nd Division; General of Division; Giuseppe Lechi	Aug: 4,596	(Kingdom of Naples) 1st Neapolitan Infantry Regiment, 1st & 2nd Battalions	1,944
Observation Corps; General of Division; Guillaume Philibert Duhesme	Cavalry Brigade; General of Brigade; Bertrand Bessières	Aug: 825	(France) 3rd Provisional Cuirassier Regiment	409
Observation Corps; General of Division; Guillaume Philibert Duhesme	Cavalry Brigade; General of Brigade; Bertrand Bessières	Aug: 825	(France) 3rd Provisional Chasseur Regiment	416
Observation Corps; General of Division; Guillaume Philibert Duhesme	Cavalry Brigade; General of Brigade; François Xavier de Schwarz	Aug: 892	(Kingdom of Italy (Napoleonic)) Prince Royal Italian Chasseur Regiment	504
Observation Corps; General of Division; Guillaume Philibert Duhesme	Cavalry Brigade; General of Brigade; François Xavier de Schwarz	Aug: 892	(Kingdom of Naples) Neapolitan Chasseur Regiment	388
Observation Corps; General of Division; Guillaume Philibert Duhesme	Corps Artillery	Aug: 356	(France) (Kingdom of Italy (Napoleonic)) Artillery & train companies	356
Observation Corps; General of Division; Guillaume Philibert Duhesme	Observation Corps Total	Aug: 12,714; Nov: 10,000	(France) (Kingdom of Italy (Napoleonic)) (Kingdom of Naples) (Switzerland)	-
VII Corps; General of Division; Laurent Gouvion Saint-Cyr	3rd Division; General of Division; Honoré Charles Reille	Aug: 8,370; Nov: 5,612	(France) 32nd Light Infantry Regiment, 1 battalion	1,100?
VII Corps; General of Division; Laurent Gouvion Saint-Cyr	3rd Division; General of Division; Honoré Charles Reille	Aug: 8,370; Nov: 5,612	(France) 16th Line Infantry Regiment, 1 battalion	840?
VII Corps; General of Division; Laurent Gouvion Saint-Cyr	3rd Division; General of Division; Honoré Charles Reille	Aug: 8,370; Nov: 5,612	(France) 56th Line Infantry Regiment, 1 battalion	840?
VII Corps; General of Division; Laurent Gouvion Saint-Cyr	3rd Division; General of Division; Honoré Charles Reille	Aug: 8,370; Nov: 5,612	(France) 113th Line Infantry Regiment, 2 battalions	1,300
VII Corps; General of Division; Laurent Gouvion Saint-Cyr	3rd Division; General of Division; Honoré Charles Reille	Aug: 8,370; Nov: 5,612	(France) Perpignan Provisional Regiment, 4 battalions	1,680
VII Corps; General of Division; Laurent Gouvion Saint-Cyr	3rd Division; General of Division; Honoré Charles Reille	Aug: 8,370; Nov: 5,612	(France) 5th Legion of the Reserve, 1 battalion	500
VII Corps; General of Division; Laurent Gouvion Saint-Cyr	3rd Division; General of Division; Honoré Charles Reille	Aug: 8,370; Nov: 5,612	(France) Chasseurs des Montagnes, 1 battalion	560?
VII Corps; General of Division; Laurent Gouvion Saint-Cyr	3rd Division; General of Division; Honoré Charles Reille	Aug: 8,370; Nov: 5,612	(Switzerland) Valais Infantry Regiment, 1 battalion	800
VII Corps; General of Division; Laurent Gouvion Saint-Cyr	3rd Division; General of Division; Honoré Charles Reille	Aug: 8,370; Nov: 5,612	(France) 4 squadrons cavalry replacements	550
VII Corps; General of Division; Laurent Gouvion Saint-Cyr	3rd Division; General of Division; Honoré Charles Reille	Aug: 8,370; Nov: 5,612	(France) 2 artillery companies	200
VII Corps; General of Division; Laurent Gouvion Saint-Cyr	4th Division; General of Division; Joseph Souham	Nov: 7,712	(France) 1st Light Infantry Regiment, 3 battalions	?
VII Corps; General of Division; Laurent Gouvion Saint-Cyr	4th Division; General of Division; Joseph Souham	Nov: 7,712	(France) 3rd Light Infantry Regiment, 1 battalion	?
VII Corps; General of Division; Laurent Gouvion Saint-Cyr	4th Division; General of Division; Joseph Souham	Nov: 7,712	(France) 7th Line Infantry Regiment, 2 battalions	?
VII Corps; General of Division; Laurent Gouvion Saint-Cyr	4th Division; General of Division; Joseph Souham	Nov: 7,712	(France) 42nd Line Infantry Regiment, 3 battalions	?
VII Corps; General of Division; Laurent Gouvion Saint-Cyr	4th Division; General of Division; Joseph Souham	Nov: 7,712	(France) 67th Line Infantry Regiment, 1 battalion	?
VII Corps; General of Division; Laurent Gouvion Saint-Cyr	5th Division; General of Division; Domenico Pino	Nov: 8,368	(Kingdom of Italy (Napoleonic)) 1st Italian Light Infantry Regiment, 3 battalions	?
VII Corps; General of Division; Laurent Gouvion Saint-Cyr	5th Division; General of Division; Domenico Pino	Nov: 8,368	(Kingdom of Italy (Napoleonic)) 2nd Italian Light Infantry Regiment, 3 battalions	?
VII Corps; General of Division; Laurent Gouvion Saint-Cyr	5th Division; General of Division; Domenico Pino	Nov: 8,368	(Kingdom of Italy (Napoleonic)) 4th Italian Line Infantry Regiment, 2 battalions	?
VII Corps; General of Division; Laurent Gouvion Saint-Cyr	5th Division; General of Division; Domenico Pino	Nov: 8,368	(Kingdom of Italy (Napoleonic)) 5th Italian Line Infantry Regiment, 1 battalion	?
VII Corps; General of Division; Laurent Gouvion Saint-Cyr	5th Division; General of Division; Domenico Pino	Nov: 8,368	(Kingdom of Italy (Napoleonic)) 6th Italian Line Infantry Regiment, 3 battalions	?
VII Corps; General of Division; Laurent Gouvion Saint-Cyr	5th Division; General of Division; Domenico Pino	Nov: 8,368	(Kingdom of Italy (Napoleonic)) 7th Italian Line Infantry Regiment, 1 battalion	?
VII Corps; General of Division; Laurent Gouvion Saint-Cyr	6th Division; General of Division; Louis François Jean Chabot	Nov: 1,988	(France) Chasseurs of the Eastern Pyrenees, 1 battalion	?
VII Corps; General of Division; Laurent Gouvion Saint-Cyr	6th Division; General of Division; Louis François Jean Chabot	Nov: 1,988	(Kingdom of Naples) 2nd Neapolitan Infantry Regiment, 2 battalions	?
VII Corps; General of Division; Laurent Gouvion Saint-Cyr	Cavalry Brigade; General of Brigade; Jacques Fontane	Nov: 1,700	(Kingdom of Italy (Napoleonic)) 7th Italian Dragoon Regiment	?
VII Corps; General of Division; Laurent Gouvion Saint-Cyr	Cavalry Brigade; General of Brigade; Jacques Fontane	Nov: 1,700	(Kingdom of Italy (Napoleonic)) Royal Italian Chasseur Regiment	?
VII Corps; General of Division; Laurent Gouvion Saint-Cyr	Cavalry Brigade; General of Brigade; Jacques Fontane	Nov: 1,700	(France) 24th Dragoon Regiment (not brigaded)	?
VII Corps; General of Division; Laurent Gouvion Saint-Cyr	VII Corps Artillery	Nov: 500	(France) (Kingdom of Italy (Napoleonic)) Artillery companies	500
VII Corps; General of Division; Laurent Gouvion Saint-Cyr	Grand Total	Nov: 42,382	(France) (Kingdom of Italy (Napoleonic)) (Kingdom of Naples) (Switzerland)	-

== Spanish order of battle ==
The Royal Spanish army included one of its three Irish regiments, the Ultonia Infantry Regiment. There were also six Swiss regiments, among them the 1st Wimpfen and 2nd Reding senior Infantry Regiments. The Provincial Grenadiers were a militia formation. Uniquely among the provinces of Spain, Catalonia raised its own type of militia, the miquelets. This was a mass levy of military aged men that was armed and paid by the church parishes. They were sometimes called somatenes after the alarm-bell (somaten) used to alert them. The miquelets were organized into 1,000-man "tercios". Newly-raised units are labeled "Volunteers" or "new". Miquelets and militia have the Catalan flag. All others are regulars.

During the Siege of Roses, the garrison consisted of 150 men of the Ultonia Regiment, one-half of the 2nd of Barcelona Light Infantry Regiment, one company of the 1st Wimpfen Swiss Regiment, the Lerida and Igualada Tercios, and elements of the Berga and Figueras Tercios. These were later reinforced by a small battalion of the Borbon Regiment. Nearly all these troops went into captivity when the place surrendered on 5 December.

One authority stated that Reding commanded two battalions each of the 1st Grenada, Baza, and Almeria Infantry Regiments at Cardedeu. Vives led newly organized Catalan units at Cardedeu, plus seven guns, but the source did not specify which units. A second historian credited the Spanish at Cardedeu with 5,000 Granadan troops under Reding and 4,000 Catalans under Vives, but did not list the individual units. This force included 600 cavalrymen and seven field guns. During the battle, Francisco Milans del Bosch was to the east with 3,000 miquelets and Luis Rebolledo de Palafox y Melci, 1st marqués de Lazán was to the north with perhaps 6,000 more soldiers. However, Milans' men were still reeling from their defeat the day before and Lazán was too slow; neither intervened at Cardedeu.

Spanish Army on 5 November 1808
Army	Division	Strength	Unit	Strength
Army of Catalonia; Captain-General; Juan Miguel de Vives y Feliu	Vanguard; Brigadier-General; Mariano Álvarez de Castro	5,600	(Spain) Ultonia Infantry Regiment	300
Army of Catalonia; Captain-General; Juan Miguel de Vives y Feliu	Vanguard; Brigadier-General; Mariano Álvarez de Castro	5,600	(Spain) Borbon Infantry Regiment	500
Army of Catalonia; Captain-General; Juan Miguel de Vives y Feliu	Vanguard; Brigadier-General; Mariano Álvarez de Castro	5,600	(Spain) 2nd of Barcelona Light Infantry Regiment	1,000
Army of Catalonia; Captain-General; Juan Miguel de Vives y Feliu	Vanguard; Brigadier-General; Mariano Álvarez de Castro	5,600	(Spain) (Switzerland) 1st Wimpfen Swiss Infantry Regiment	400
Army of Catalonia; Captain-General; Juan Miguel de Vives y Feliu	Vanguard; Brigadier-General; Mariano Álvarez de Castro	5,600	(Spain) (Catalonia) 1st Gerona Tercio	900
Army of Catalonia; Captain-General; Juan Miguel de Vives y Feliu	Vanguard; Brigadier-General; Mariano Álvarez de Castro	5,600	(Spain) (Catalonia) 2nd Gerona Tercio	400
Army of Catalonia; Captain-General; Juan Miguel de Vives y Feliu	Vanguard; Brigadier-General; Mariano Álvarez de Castro	5,600	(Spain) (Catalonia) Igualada Tercio	400
Army of Catalonia; Captain-General; Juan Miguel de Vives y Feliu	Vanguard; Brigadier-General; Mariano Álvarez de Castro	5,600	(Spain) (Catalonia) Cervera Tercio	400
Army of Catalonia; Captain-General; Juan Miguel de Vives y Feliu	Vanguard; Brigadier-General; Mariano Álvarez de Castro	5,600	(Spain) (Catalonia) 1st Tarragona Tercio	800
Army of Catalonia; Captain-General; Juan Miguel de Vives y Feliu	Vanguard; Brigadier-General; Mariano Álvarez de Castro	5,600	(Spain) (Catalonia) Figueras Tercio	400
Army of Catalonia; Captain-General; Juan Miguel de Vives y Feliu	Vanguard; Brigadier-General; Mariano Álvarez de Castro	5,600	(Spain) San Narciso Hussar Regiment (new)	100
Army of Catalonia; Captain-General; Juan Miguel de Vives y Feliu	1st Division; General; Conde de Caldagues	4,998; 6 guns	(Spain) 2nd Walloon Guards	314
Army of Catalonia; Captain-General; Juan Miguel de Vives y Feliu	1st Division; General; Conde de Caldagues	4,998; 6 guns	(Spain) Soria Infantry Regiment	780
Army of Catalonia; Captain-General; Juan Miguel de Vives y Feliu	1st Division; General; Conde de Caldagues	4,998; 6 guns	(Spain) Borbon Infantry Regiment (det.)	151
Army of Catalonia; Captain-General; Juan Miguel de Vives y Feliu	1st Division; General; Conde de Caldagues	4,998; 6 guns	(Spain) 2nd of Savoia Infantry Regiment	1,734
Army of Catalonia; Captain-General; Juan Miguel de Vives y Feliu	1st Division; General; Conde de Caldagues	4,998; 6 guns	(Spain) (Switzerland) 2nd Reding senior Swiss Infantry Regiment (det.)	270
Army of Catalonia; Captain-General; Juan Miguel de Vives y Feliu	1st Division; General; Conde de Caldagues	4,998; 6 guns	(Spain) (Catalonia) Tortosa Tercio	984
Army of Catalonia; Captain-General; Juan Miguel de Vives y Feliu	1st Division; General; Conde de Caldagues	4,998; 6 guns	(Spain) (Catalonia) Igualada and Cervera Tercio (det.)	245
Army of Catalonia; Captain-General; Juan Miguel de Vives y Feliu	1st Division; General; Conde de Caldagues	4,998; 6 guns	(Spain) Sappers	50
Army of Catalonia; Captain-General; Juan Miguel de Vives y Feliu	1st Division; General; Conde de Caldagues	4,998; 6 guns	(Spain) Españoles Hussar Regiment, 2 squadrons	220
Army of Catalonia; Captain-General; Juan Miguel de Vives y Feliu	1st Division; General; Conde de Caldagues	4,998; 6 guns	(Spain) Cataluña Cazadores Cavalry (new)	180
Army of Catalonia; Captain-General; Juan Miguel de Vives y Feliu	1st Division; General; Conde de Caldagues	4,998; 6 guns	(Spain) Artillery battery	70, 6 guns
Army of Catalonia; Captain-General; Juan Miguel de Vives y Feliu	2nd Division; General Laguna	2,360; 7 guns	(Spain) Old Castile Provincial Grenadiers	972
Army of Catalonia; Captain-General; Juan Miguel de Vives y Feliu	2nd Division; General Laguna	2,360; 7 guns	(Spain) New Castile Provincial Grenadiers	924
Army of Catalonia; Captain-General; Juan Miguel de Vives y Feliu	2nd Division; General Laguna	2,360; 7 guns	(Spain) Zaragosa Volunteers	150
Army of Catalonia; Captain-General; Juan Miguel de Vives y Feliu	2nd Division; General Laguna	2,360; 7 guns	(Spain) Sappers	30
Army of Catalonia; Captain-General; Juan Miguel de Vives y Feliu	2nd Division; General Laguna	2,360; 7 guns	(Spain) Españoles Hussar Regiment	200
Army of Catalonia; Captain-General; Juan Miguel de Vives y Feliu	2nd Division; General Laguna	2,360; 7 guns	(Spain) Artillery battery	84, 7 guns
Army of Catalonia; Captain-General; Juan Miguel de Vives y Feliu	3rd Division; General La Serna	2,458	(Spain) Grenada Infantry Regiment	961
Army of Catalonia; Captain-General; Juan Miguel de Vives y Feliu	3rd Division; General La Serna	2,458	(Spain) (Catalonia) 2nd Tarragona Tercio	922
Army of Catalonia; Captain-General; Juan Miguel de Vives y Feliu	3rd Division; General La Serna	2,458	(Spain) (Catalonia) Arzu Division (new)	325
Army of Catalonia; Captain-General; Juan Miguel de Vives y Feliu	3rd Division; General La Serna	2,458	(Spain) (Catalonia) Sueltas Companies (new)	250
Army of Catalonia; Captain-General; Juan Miguel de Vives y Feliu	4th Division; General; Francisco Milans del Bosch	3,710	(Spain) (Catalonia) 1st Lerida Tercio	872
Army of Catalonia; Captain-General; Juan Miguel de Vives y Feliu	4th Division; General; Francisco Milans del Bosch	3,710	(Spain) (Catalonia) Vich Tercio	976
Army of Catalonia; Captain-General; Juan Miguel de Vives y Feliu	4th Division; General; Francisco Milans del Bosch	3,710	(Spain) (Catalonia) Manresa Tercio	937
Army of Catalonia; Captain-General; Juan Miguel de Vives y Feliu	4th Division; General; Francisco Milans del Bosch	3,710	(Spain) (Catalonia) Valls Tercio	925
Army of Catalonia; Captain-General; Juan Miguel de Vives y Feliu	Reserve	907; 4 guns	(Spain) Spanish Guards	60
Army of Catalonia; Captain-General; Juan Miguel de Vives y Feliu	Reserve	907; 4 guns	(Spain) Grenadiers Soria Regiment	188
Army of Catalonia; Captain-General; Juan Miguel de Vives y Feliu	Reserve	907; 4 guns	(Spain) (Switzerland) Grenadiers Wimpfen Swiss Regiment	169
Army of Catalonia; Captain-General; Juan Miguel de Vives y Feliu	Reserve	907; 4 guns	(Spain) General's Bodyguard	340
Army of Catalonia; Captain-General; Juan Miguel de Vives y Feliu	Reserve	907; 4 guns	(Spain) Sappers	20
Army of Catalonia; Captain-General; Juan Miguel de Vives y Feliu	Reserve	907; 4 guns	(Spain) Españoles Hussar Regiment	80
Army of Catalonia; Captain-General; Juan Miguel de Vives y Feliu	Reserve	907; 4 guns	(Spain) Artillery battery	50, 4 guns
Army of Granada; General; Theodor von Reding	1st Division	8,200	(Spain) (Switzerland) 2nd Reding senior Swiss Regiment	1,000
Army of Granada; General; Theodor von Reding	1st Division	8,200	(Spain) 1st Granada (Iliberia) Infantry Regiment (new)	2,400
Army of Granada; General; Theodor von Reding	1st Division	8,200	(Spain) Baza Infantry Regiment (new)	2,400
Army of Granada; General; Theodor von Reding	1st Division	8,200	(Spain) Almeria Infantry Regiment (new)	2,400
Army of Granada; General; Theodor von Reding	2nd Division	6,000	(Spain) Santa Fé Infantry Regiment (new)	2,400
Army of Granada; General; Theodor von Reding	2nd Division	6,000	(Spain) Antequera Infantry Regiment (new)	1,200
Army of Granada; General; Theodor von Reding	2nd Division	6,000	(Spain) Loja Infantry Regiment (new)	2,400
Army of Granada; General; Theodor von Reding	Cavalry	670	(Spain) Granada Hussar Regiment (new)	670
Army of Granada; General; Theodor von Reding	Artillery	130, 6 g.	(Spain) Artillery battery	130, 6 guns
Army of Aragon; Captain-General; José de Palafox y Melci; Not present	3rd Division; General; Luis Palafox, marqués de Lazán	4,688	(Spain) 1st Aragon Volunteers	638
Army of Aragon; Captain-General; José de Palafox y Melci; Not present	3rd Division; General; Luis Palafox, marqués de Lazán	4,688	(Spain) 3rd Aragon Volunteers	593
Army of Aragon; Captain-General; José de Palafox y Melci; Not present	3rd Division; General; Luis Palafox, marqués de Lazán	4,688	(Spain) Fernando VII of Aragon Regiment (new)	648
Army of Aragon; Captain-General; José de Palafox y Melci; Not present	3rd Division; General; Luis Palafox, marqués de Lazán	4,688	(Spain) Daroca Regiment (new)	503
Army of Aragon; Captain-General; José de Palafox y Melci; Not present	3rd Division; General; Luis Palafox, marqués de Lazán	4,688	(Spain) La Reunion Regiment (new)	1,286
Army of Aragon; Captain-General; José de Palafox y Melci; Not present	3rd Division; General; Luis Palafox, marqués de Lazán	4,688	(Spain) Reserva del General Regiment (new)	934
Army of Aragon; Captain-General; José de Palafox y Melci; Not present	3rd Division; General; Luis Palafox, marqués de Lazán	4,688	(Spain) Fernando VII Cazadores Cavalry, 1 troop	22
Army of Aragon; Captain-General; José de Palafox y Melci; Not present	3rd Division; General; Luis Palafox, marqués de Lazán	4,688	(Spain) Artillery battery	64
