= Let the banners flutter =

German song

Let the banners flutter (German: Weit lasst die Fahnen wehen) is a German song written by composer Gustav Schulten (30 January 1897 - 1945) in 1917, and published nationally in Germany in the year 1941.

The song refers to the Landsknecht movement. A Landsknecht is the name given to a mostly German mercenary of the late 15th and 16th centuries who fought on foot and whose primary weapon was the pike, following the Swiss model of the Reisläufer.

== Lyrics ==
| German lyrics | Approximate English translation |
|---|---|
| Weit laßt die Fahnen wehen, Wir woll'n zum Sturme gehen Frei nach Landsknechtsart. Laßt den verlor'nen Haufen, Vorwärts zum Sturme laufen Wir folgen dicht geschart! | Far let the banners flutter, we want to go to the storm Free by landsknecht custom Let the forlorn vanguard trek forwards to the storm, we follow tightly packed! |
| Die Mauern wir erklettern, Die Türme wir zerschmettern Und in die Stadt hinein. Wer uns den Lauf will hemmen, Sich uns entgegenstemmen Der soll des Teufels sein! | We climb the walls, we shatter the towers - storming right into the town. Whoever tries to hamper our running, to set himself against us - he shall go to hell! |
| Es harren unser drinnen, Wenn wir die Stadt gewinnen Viel Gold und Edelstein. Das wird ein lustig Leben, Bei unserm Lager geben Bei Würfelspiel und Wein! | Inside are, awaiting us - when we capture the town - lots of gold and jewels. It will give us a merry life in our camp with dice games and wine! |
| Die Reihen fest geschlossen, Und vorwärts unverdrossen Falle, wer fallen mag. Kann er nicht mit uns laufen, So mag er sich verschnaufen Bis an den Jüngsten Tag! | Tightly close the ranks, let's go forward tirelessly! May fall whoever will fall. If he can not follow us, he may rest until the Judgement Day! |
