= 3rd Swiss Regiment Reding =

Regimiento Suizo de Reding n.º 3
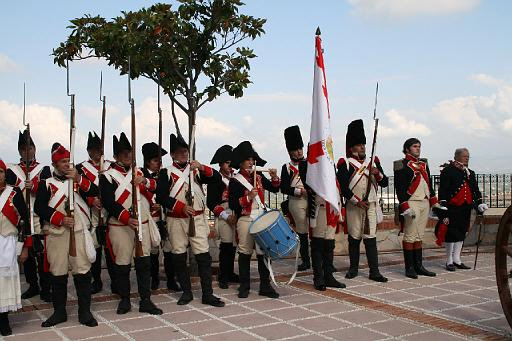
- Regimiento Suizo de Reding nº 3 (2008 re-enactment, Málaga)
- Active: 1742 - 1829
- Disbanded: 1829
- Country: Spain
- Allegiance: Crown of Spain
- Branch: Army
- Type: Infantry
- Role: Front-line
- Engagements: American Revolutionary War; War of the First Coalition: War of the Pyrenees; Peninsular War: Battle of Bailén; Battle of Valls

Commanders
- Notable commanders: Theodor von Reding

The 3rd Swiss Regiment Reding was a unit of Swiss soldiers in the Spanish Army and one of several Swiss regiments serving the Spanish Crown in the 18th century. The regiment was founded by a royal proclamation of Philip V in 1742 and recruited from the Canton of Schwyz in central Switzerland.

It was the third Swiss regiment in service at the time (out of about a dozen or so Swiss Regiments historically) and was the second raising of a regiment under Theodor von Reding. It is therefore either referred to as the 2nd Regiment Reding or the 3rd Swiss Regiment.

== See also ==
- Army of Spain (Peninsular War)
