= Sturler =

Swiss noble family

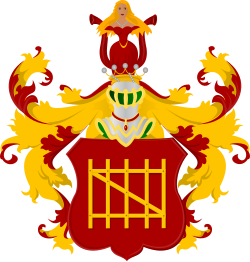
Coat of arms of the Sturler family

De Sturler (also: Sturler, Stürler, von Stürler, de Stürler de Frienisberg en de Sturler de Frienisberg) is a Swiss noble family from Bern since the 15th century. The family members spread to the Netherlands, the Dutch East Indies, France, Belgium and Russia where they were also elevated to the nobility.

== History ==
The ancestral line commences with Johann (Hans) Stürler, who served as a member of the Great Council of Bern between 1472 and 1480. For centuries thereafter, his descendants continued to hold seats in either the Small or the Great Council of Bern. Several branches of the family entered state service as military officers (Swiss mercenaries) and rendered service under several sovereigns in Europe during the 18th and 19th century.

In 1876, 1884, and 1900, three members of the family were ennobled within the Dutch nobility. A number of family members have also been distinguished with the decoration of the Dutch Military Order of William.
