= Battle of Valls =

1809 Battle of the Peninsular War

- Part of the Peninsular War
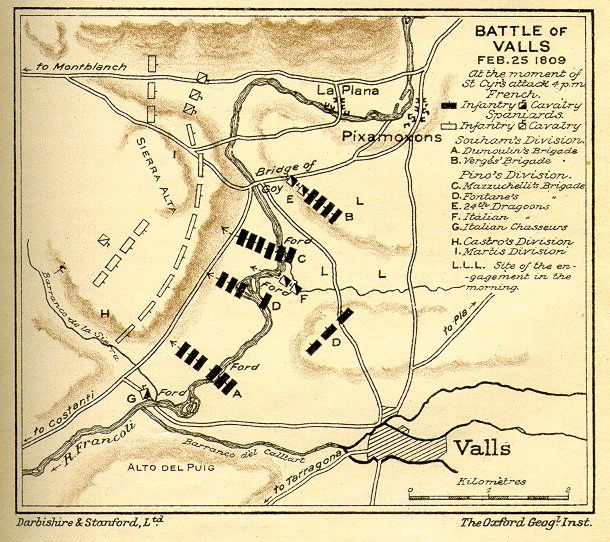
- Battle of Valls
Date	25 February 1809
Location	Valls, Spain 41.2833°N 1.2500°E
Result	French-allied victory

Belligerents
(First French Empire) French Empire (Kingdom of Italy (Napoleonic)) Kingdom of Italy; Kingdom of Westphalia	Spain

Commanders and leaders
(France) Laurent Gouvion Saint-Cyr (France) Annet Morio de L'Isle (Kingdom of Italy (Napoleonic)) Domenico Pino	Theodor von Reding (DOW)

Strength
13,300	10,540–11,000 infantry, 700 cavalry, 8 guns

Casualties and losses
1,000 killed or wounded	1,500 killed or wounded 1,500 captured

Peninsular War: Aragón Catalonia
current battle

The Battle of Valls was fought on 25 February 1809, during the Peninsular War, between a French force under Laurent Gouvion Saint-Cyr and a Spanish force under Theodor von Reding. Fought near the town of Valls in Catalonia, Spain, the battle ended in a French victory. General Reding was fatally wounded during a cavalry charge against French cavalry.

== Background ==
The Spanish campaign in early 1809 started with the Battle of Uclés.

== Battle ==
During actions on 15 February 1809, Reding's left wing was cut off from reinforcement by a French attack. Reding decided to retrieve this cut-off army, instead of counter striking at Souham. Planning to meet up with his northern units, Reding left Tarragona with only 2,000 men and most of his cavalry. On his way, he successfully met with units standing guard over the pass to Santa Cristina and another unit at Santas Cruces. Having sufficient strength, he continued to the town of Santa Coloma, whereupon he met with his previously cut-off left wing. With the combined left wing and the forces he took with him, Reding then had a total of almost 20,000 troops at his disposal. Deciding to defend Tarragona, he dispatched 4–5,000 of his men to watch Igualada and pressed home with his remaining men. St. Cyr, aware of Reding's movements, moved to block the two direct routes of returning to Tarragona. Reding, aware that Souham had moved and taken position in the town of Valls, still decided to take the route. Committing his forces to a march at night, Reding got his army to a bridge only two miles out of the town before daybreak.

Upon arriving at the bridge, Reding's vanguard was involved in a skirmish with men of Souham's division. Both commanders, realizing that the time for battle had arrived, rushed to get their men into position. Souham brought the rest of his division out of Valls and set them into position north of town. Reding, deciding this division to be insignificant, pushed his advanced line and most of his center across the river, continuing to send more across until the French division finally broke and fell back to Valls. At this point, most of his men and baggage train had crossed the bridge, but he nonetheless decided to give his men a long break. St. Cyr, learning of the attack later in the day, rushed to Valls with the 7th Italian Dragoons, also bringing the Italian division which would be delayed for six hours before joining the French line at Valls. Having seen the French line rallying when St. Cyr arrived with the Italian Cavalry, Reding pulled his forces back across the river in a defensive position. After three hours had passed, the Italian division had finally caught up to St. Cyr, who formed the French line of battle and crossed the river under constant bombardment. The Spanish forces poured fire onto the French attackers but as the columned French grew close to the Spanish line, the Spaniards began to rout. The only point of hand-to-hand combat came when Reding took his staff and cavalry and attacked the left column, only to be met by the Italian dragoons. in the ensuing melee, Reding himself took three fatal wounds.

== French order of battle ==
VII Corps of General Laurent Gouvion Saint-Cyr on 1 February 1809
Corps	Division	Strength	Units
VII Corps; General of Division; Laurent Gouvion Saint-Cyr	1st Division; General of Division; Joseph Souham	6,220	(France) 1st Light Infantry Regiment, 3 battalions
VII Corps; General of Division; Laurent Gouvion Saint-Cyr	1st Division; General of Division; Joseph Souham	6,220	(France) 3rd Light Infantry Regiment, 1 battalion
VII Corps; General of Division; Laurent Gouvion Saint-Cyr	1st Division; General of Division; Joseph Souham	6,220	(France) 7th Line Infantry Regiment, 2 battalions
VII Corps; General of Division; Laurent Gouvion Saint-Cyr	1st Division; General of Division; Joseph Souham	6,220	(France) 42nd Line Infantry Regiment, 3 battalions
VII Corps; General of Division; Laurent Gouvion Saint-Cyr	1st Division; General of Division; Joseph Souham	6,220	(France) 67th Line Infantry Regiment, 1 battalion
VII Corps; General of Division; Laurent Gouvion Saint-Cyr	2nd Division; General of Division; Joseph Chabran	4,037	(France) 2nd Line Infantry Regiment, 1 battalion
VII Corps; General of Division; Laurent Gouvion Saint-Cyr	2nd Division; General of Division; Joseph Chabran	4,037	(France) 10th Line Infantry Regiment, 1 battalion
VII Corps; General of Division; Laurent Gouvion Saint-Cyr	2nd Division; General of Division; Joseph Chabran	4,037	(France) 37th Line Infantry Regiment, 1 battalion
VII Corps; General of Division; Laurent Gouvion Saint-Cyr	2nd Division; General of Division; Joseph Chabran	4,037	(France) 56th Line Infantry Regiment, 1 battalion
VII Corps; General of Division; Laurent Gouvion Saint-Cyr	2nd Division; General of Division; Joseph Chabran	4,037	(France) 93rd Line Infantry Regiment, 1 battalion
VII Corps; General of Division; Laurent Gouvion Saint-Cyr	2nd Division; General of Division; Joseph Chabran	4,037	(Switzerland) 2nd Swiss Infantry Regiment, 1 battalion
VII Corps; General of Division; Laurent Gouvion Saint-Cyr	3rd Division; General of Division; Louis François Jean Chabot	1,633	(France) Chasseurs des Montagnes, 1 battalion
VII Corps; General of Division; Laurent Gouvion Saint-Cyr	3rd Division; General of Division; Louis François Jean Chabot	1,633	(Kingdom of Naples) 2nd Neapolitan Infantry Regiment, 2 battalions
VII Corps; General of Division; Laurent Gouvion Saint-Cyr	4th Division; General of Division; Honoré Charles Reille	3,980	(France) 32nd Light Infantry Regiment, 1 battalion
VII Corps; General of Division; Laurent Gouvion Saint-Cyr	4th Division; General of Division; Honoré Charles Reille	3,980	(France) 2nd Line Infantry Regiment, 1 battalion
VII Corps; General of Division; Laurent Gouvion Saint-Cyr	4th Division; General of Division; Honoré Charles Reille	3,980	(France) 16th Line Infantry Regiment, 1 battalion
VII Corps; General of Division; Laurent Gouvion Saint-Cyr	4th Division; General of Division; Honoré Charles Reille	3,980	(France) 56th Line Infantry Regiment, 1 battalion
VII Corps; General of Division; Laurent Gouvion Saint-Cyr	4th Division; General of Division; Honoré Charles Reille	3,980	(France) 113th Line Infantry Regiment, 2 battalions
VII Corps; General of Division; Laurent Gouvion Saint-Cyr	4th Division; General of Division; Honoré Charles Reille	3,980	(Switzerland) Valais Infantry Regiment, 1 battalion
VII Corps; General of Division; Laurent Gouvion Saint-Cyr	5th Division; General of Division; Domenico Pino	8,008	(Kingdom of Italy (Napoleonic)) 1st Italian Light Infantry Regiment, 3 battalions
VII Corps; General of Division; Laurent Gouvion Saint-Cyr	5th Division; General of Division; Domenico Pino	8,008	(Kingdom of Italy (Napoleonic)) 2nd Italian Light Infantry Regiment, 3 battalions
VII Corps; General of Division; Laurent Gouvion Saint-Cyr	5th Division; General of Division; Domenico Pino	8,008	(Kingdom of Italy (Napoleonic)) 4th Italian Line Infantry Regiment, 3 battalions
VII Corps; General of Division; Laurent Gouvion Saint-Cyr	5th Division; General of Division; Domenico Pino	8,008	(Kingdom of Italy (Napoleonic)) 6th Italian Line Infantry Regiment, 3 battalions
VII Corps; General of Division; Laurent Gouvion Saint-Cyr	5th Division; General of Division; Domenico Pino	8,008	(Kingdom of Italy (Napoleonic)) 7th Italian Line Infantry Regiment, 1 battalion
VII Corps; General of Division; Laurent Gouvion Saint-Cyr	6th Division; General of Division; Giuseppe Lechi	3,941	(Kingdom of Italy (Napoleonic)) 2nd Italian Line Infantry Regiment, 1 battalion
VII Corps; General of Division; Laurent Gouvion Saint-Cyr	6th Division; General of Division; Giuseppe Lechi	3,941	(Kingdom of Italy (Napoleonic)) 4th Italian Line Infantry Regiment, 1 battalion
VII Corps; General of Division; Laurent Gouvion Saint-Cyr	6th Division; General of Division; Giuseppe Lechi	3,941	(Kingdom of Italy (Napoleonic)) 5th Italian Line Infantry Regiment, 1 battalion
VII Corps; General of Division; Laurent Gouvion Saint-Cyr	6th Division; General of Division; Giuseppe Lechi	3,941	(Kingdom of Italy (Napoleonic)) Italian Velites Infantry Regiment, 1 battalion
VII Corps; General of Division; Laurent Gouvion Saint-Cyr	6th Division; General of Division; Giuseppe Lechi	3,941	(Kingdom of Naples) 1st Neapolitan Infantry Regiment, 2 battalions
VII Corps; General of Division; Laurent Gouvion Saint-Cyr	German Division; General of Brigade; Annet Morio de L'Isle	5,321	(Kingdom of Westphalia) 1st Westphalian Light Infantry Regiment
VII Corps; General of Division; Laurent Gouvion Saint-Cyr	German Division; General of Brigade; Annet Morio de L'Isle	5,321	(Kingdom of Westphalia) 2nd Westphalian Line Infantry Regiment
VII Corps; General of Division; Laurent Gouvion Saint-Cyr	German Division; General of Brigade; Annet Morio de L'Isle	5,321	(Kingdom of Westphalia) 3rd Westphalian Line Infantry Regiment
VII Corps; General of Division; Laurent Gouvion Saint-Cyr	German Division; General of Brigade; Annet Morio de L'Isle	5,321	(Kingdom of Westphalia) 4th Westphalian Line Infantry Regiment
VII Corps; General of Division; Laurent Gouvion Saint-Cyr	French Cavalry	1,730	(France) 24th Dragoon Regiment
VII Corps; General of Division; Laurent Gouvion Saint-Cyr	French Cavalry	1,730	(France) 3rd Provisional Cuirassier Regiment
VII Corps; General of Division; Laurent Gouvion Saint-Cyr	French Cavalry	1,730	(France) 3rd Provisional Chasseur Regiment
VII Corps; General of Division; Laurent Gouvion Saint-Cyr	Italian Cavalry	1,862	(Kingdom of Italy (Napoleonic)) Napoleone Dragoon Regiment
VII Corps; General of Division; Laurent Gouvion Saint-Cyr	Italian Cavalry	1,862	(Kingdom of Italy (Napoleonic)) Royal Chasseur Regiment
VII Corps; General of Division; Laurent Gouvion Saint-Cyr	Italian Cavalry	1,862	(Kingdom of Italy (Napoleonic)) Prince Royal Chasseur Regiment
VII Corps; General of Division; Laurent Gouvion Saint-Cyr	Italian Cavalry	1,862	(Kingdom of Naples) Neapolitan Chasseur Regiment
VII Corps; General of Division; Laurent Gouvion Saint-Cyr	French Artillery	2,050	(France) Various artillery companies
VII Corps; General of Division; Laurent Gouvion Saint-Cyr	Italian Artillery	585	(Kingdom of Italy (Napoleonic)) Various artillery companies
VII Corps; General of Division; Laurent Gouvion Saint-Cyr	German Artillery	48	(Kingdom of Westphalia) Artillery company
VII Corps; General of Division; Laurent Gouvion Saint-Cyr	Corps Total	39,415	(France) (Kingdom of Italy (Napoleonic)) (Kingdom of Westphalia) (Kingdom of Naples) (Switzerland)

== Aftermath ==
The Spanish campaign in early 1809 proceeded with the French advance in Catalonia in the Third siege of Girona and the Battle of Alcañiz.

== See also ==
- Timeline of the Peninsular War

== Bibliography ==
- Bodart, Gaston (1908). Militär-historisches Kriegs-Lexikon (1618-1905).
- Gates, David (2002). The Spanish Ulcer: A History of the Peninsular War. London: Pimlico. ISBN 0-7126-9730-6.
- Oman, Charles; Hall, John A. (1903). A History of the Peninsular War. Vol. 2. Clarendon Press.
- Oman, Sir Charles William Chadwick (1902b). A History of the Peninsular War. Vol. II. Oxford: Clarendon Press.

Preceded by Battle of Corunna	Napoleonic Wars; Battle of Valls	Succeeded by Tyrolean Rebellion
