= Swiss mercenaries =

Historical Swiss mercenary infantry forces

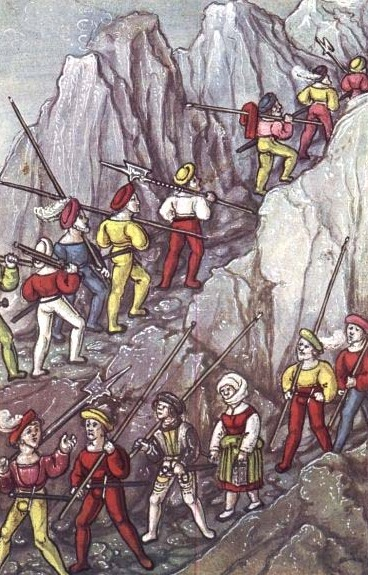
Swiss mercenaries crossing the Alps. Illustration from an illuminated manuscript of the Luzerner Schilling, 1513.

The Swiss mercenaries were a powerful infantry force of professional soldiers originating from the cantons of the Old Swiss Confederacy. They were notable for their service in foreign armies, especially among the military forces of the kings of France, throughout the early modern period of European history, from the Late Middle Ages into the 19th century.

Their service as mercenaries was at its peak during the Renaissance, when their proven battlefield capabilities made them sought-after mercenary troops. There followed a period of decline, as technological and organizational advances counteracted the Swiss' advantages. Switzerland's military isolationism largely put an end to organized mercenary activity; the principal remnant of the practice is the Pontifical Swiss Guard at the Vatican.

== Ascendancy ==
During the Late Middle Ages, mercenary forces grew in importance in Europe, as veterans from the Hundred Years War (1337–1453) and other conflicts came to see soldiering as a profession rather than a temporary activity, and commanders sought long-term professionals rather than temporary feudal levies to fight their wars. Swiss mercenaries (German: Reisläufer) were valued throughout the kingdoms and states of medieval Europe for the power of their determined mass attack in deep columns with the spear, the pike, and halberd. Hiring them was made even more attractive because entire ready-made Swiss mercenary contingents could be obtained by simply contracting with their local governments, the various cantons of the Old Swiss Confederacy—the cantons had a form of militia system in which the soldiers were bound to serve and were trained and equipped to do so.

The warriors of the Swiss cantons had gradually developed a reputation across Europe as skilled soldiers, due to their successful defense of their liberties against their Austrian Habsburg overlords, starting as early as the late 13th century, including remarkable upset victories over heavily armoured knights at Morgarten and Laupen. This was furthered by later successful campaigns of regional expansion, mainly into the Italian Peninsula. By the 15th century, they were greatly valued as mercenary soldiers, particularly following their series of notable victories in the Burgundian Wars (1474–1477) in the latter part of the century. The standing mercenary army of the Hungarian king Matthias Corvinus, known as the "Black Army" (1458–1490), also contained Swiss pikemen units, who were held in high regard by the king. The native German term Reisläufer literally means "one who goes to war" and is derived from the Middle High German Reise, meaning "military campaign".

The Swiss mercenaries, with their head-down attack in huge columns with the long pike, refusal to take prisoners, and consistent record of victory, were greatly feared and admired—for instance, the Italian diplomat and political philosopher Niccolò Machiavelli addressed their system of combat at length in the twelfth chapter of his literary masterpiece, The Prince (1513–1532). Although often referred to as "pikemen", the Swiss mercenary units also contained halberdiers as well until several decades into the 16th century, as well as a small number of skirmishers armed with bows, crossbows, or early firearms to precede the rapid advance of the attack column.

The young men who went off to fight, and sometimes die, in foreign service had several incentives—limited economic options in the still largely rural cantons; adventure; pride in the reputation of the Swiss as soldiers; and what military historian Sir Charles Oman describes as a love of combat and warfighting in and of itself, due to two centuries of conflict.

== Italian Wars and the Landsknechts ==
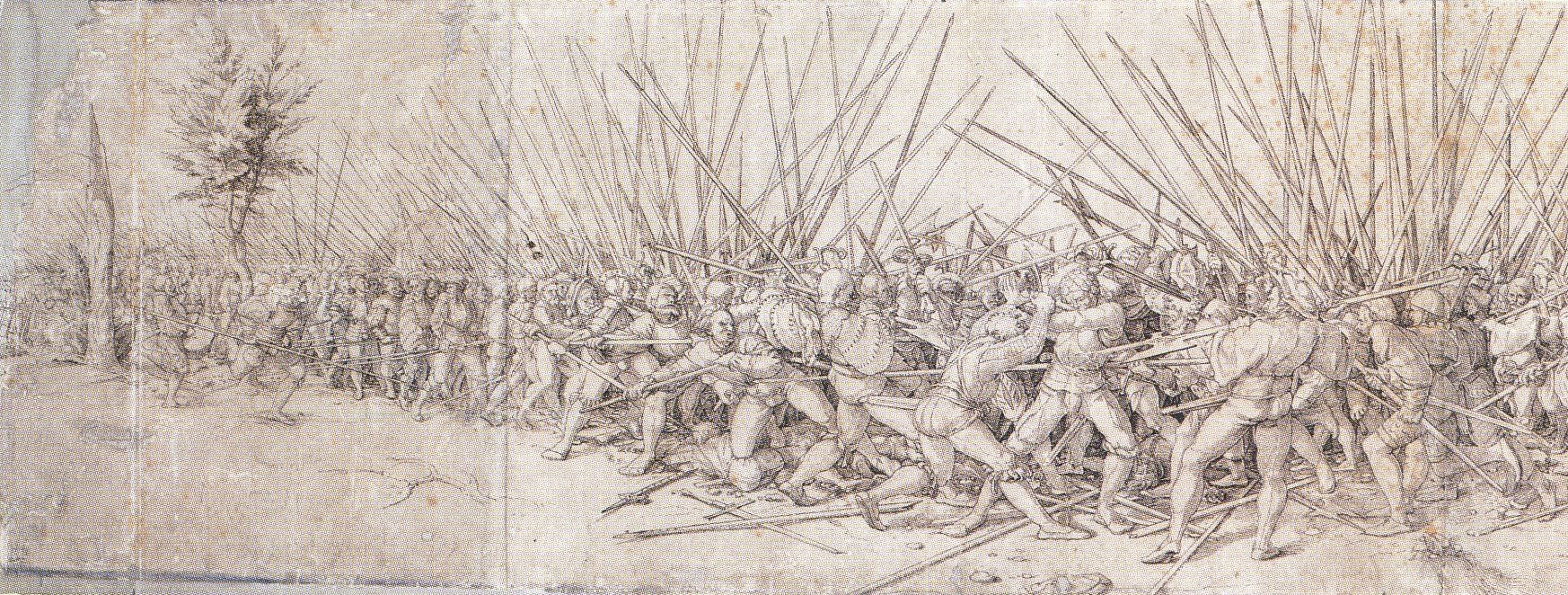
Swiss mercenaries and Landsknechts engaged in a push of pike. Engraving by Hans Holbein the Younger, early 16th century

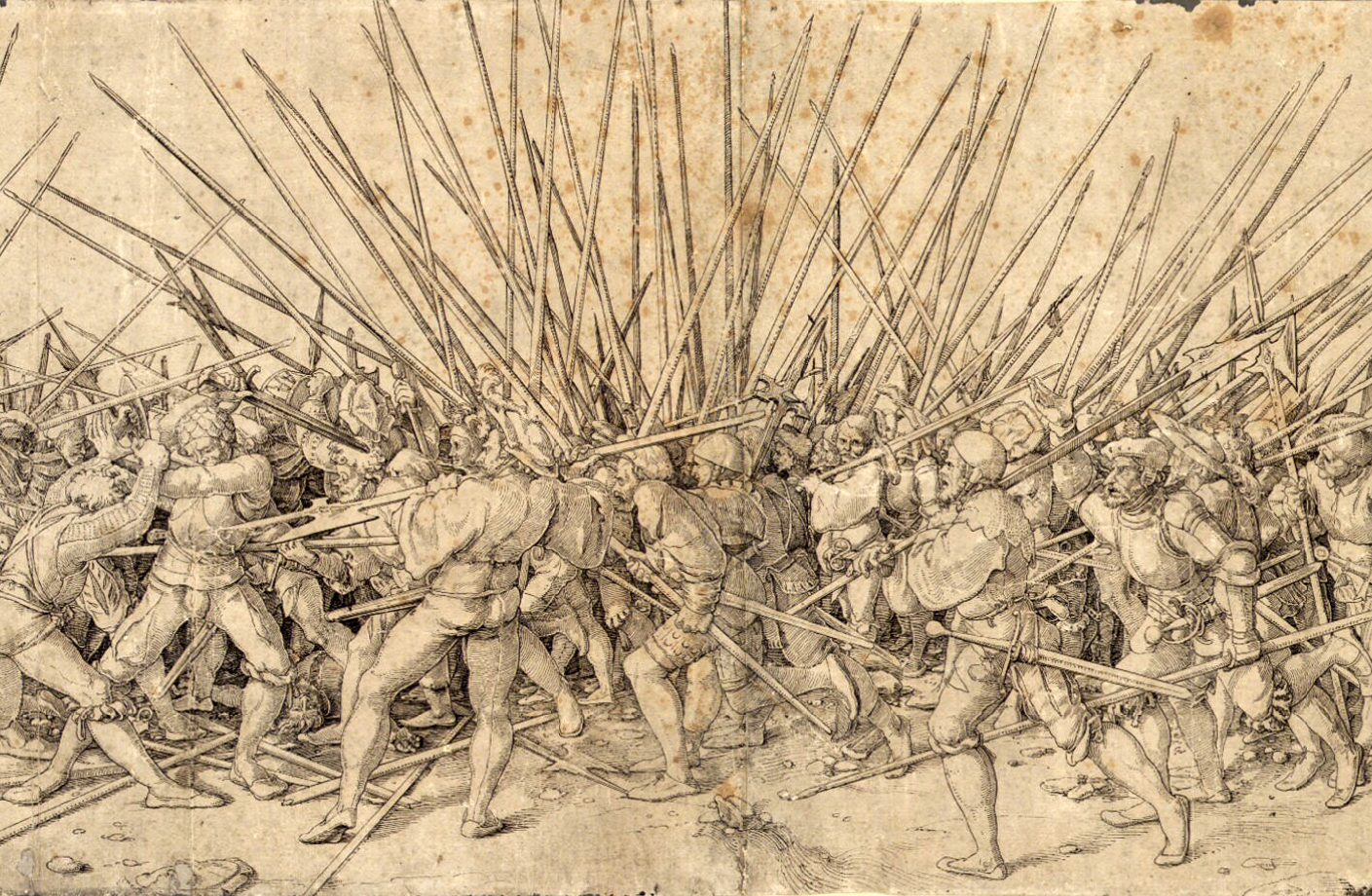
Right hand section of preceding drawing

Until roughly 1490, the Swiss had a virtual monopoly on pike-armed mercenary service. After that date, the Swiss mercenaries were increasingly supplanted by imitators, chiefly the Landsknechts. Landsknechts were Germans (at first largely from Swabia) and became proficient at Swiss tactics, even surpassing them with their usage of the Zweihänder to crush opposing pike formations. This produced a force that filled the ranks of European armies with mercenary regiments for decades.

After 1515 the Swiss pledged themselves to neutrality, other than regarding Swiss soldiers serving in the ranks of the Royal French army. The Landsknecht, would continue to serve any paymaster, even, at times, enemies of the Holy Roman Emperor. Landsknechts at times even fought each other on the battlefield. The Landsknecht often assumed the multi-coloured and striped clothing of the Swiss.

The Swiss were not flattered by the imitation, and the two bodies of mercenaries immediately became bitter rivals over employment and on the battlefield, where they were often opposed during the major European conflict of the early sixteenth century, the Italian Wars. Although the Swiss generally had a significant edge in a simple "push of pike", the resulting combat was quite savage, and known to Italian onlookers as "bad war". Period artists such as Hans Holbein attest to the fact that two such huge pike columns crashing into each other could result in a maelstrom of battle, with many dead and wounded on both sides.

Despite the competition from the Landsknechts, and imitation by other armies (most notably the Spanish, which adopted pike-handling as one element of its tercios), the Swiss fighting reputation reached its zenith between 1480 and 1525. The Battle of Novara, fought by Swiss mercenaries, is seen by some as the perfect Swiss battle. Even the close defeat at the Battle of Marignano in 1515, the "Battle of Giants", was seen as an achievement of sorts for Swiss arms due to the ferocity of the fighting and the good order of their withdrawal.

The repulse at Marignano presaged the decline of the Swiss form of pike warfare—eventually, the two-century run of Swiss victories ended in 1522 with disaster at the Battle of Bicocca when combined Spanish tercios and Landsknecht forces decisively defeated them using superior tactics, fortifications, artillery, and new technology (i.e. handguns). At Bicocca, the Swiss mercenaries, serving the French king, attempted repeatedly to storm an impregnable defensive position without artillery or missile support, only to be mown down by small-arms and artillery fire. Never before had the Swiss suffered such heavy losses while being unable to inflict much damage upon their foe. The Swiss are generally considered to have been surpassed by the Landsknechts after the Battle of Pavia in 1525.

== Organization and tactics ==
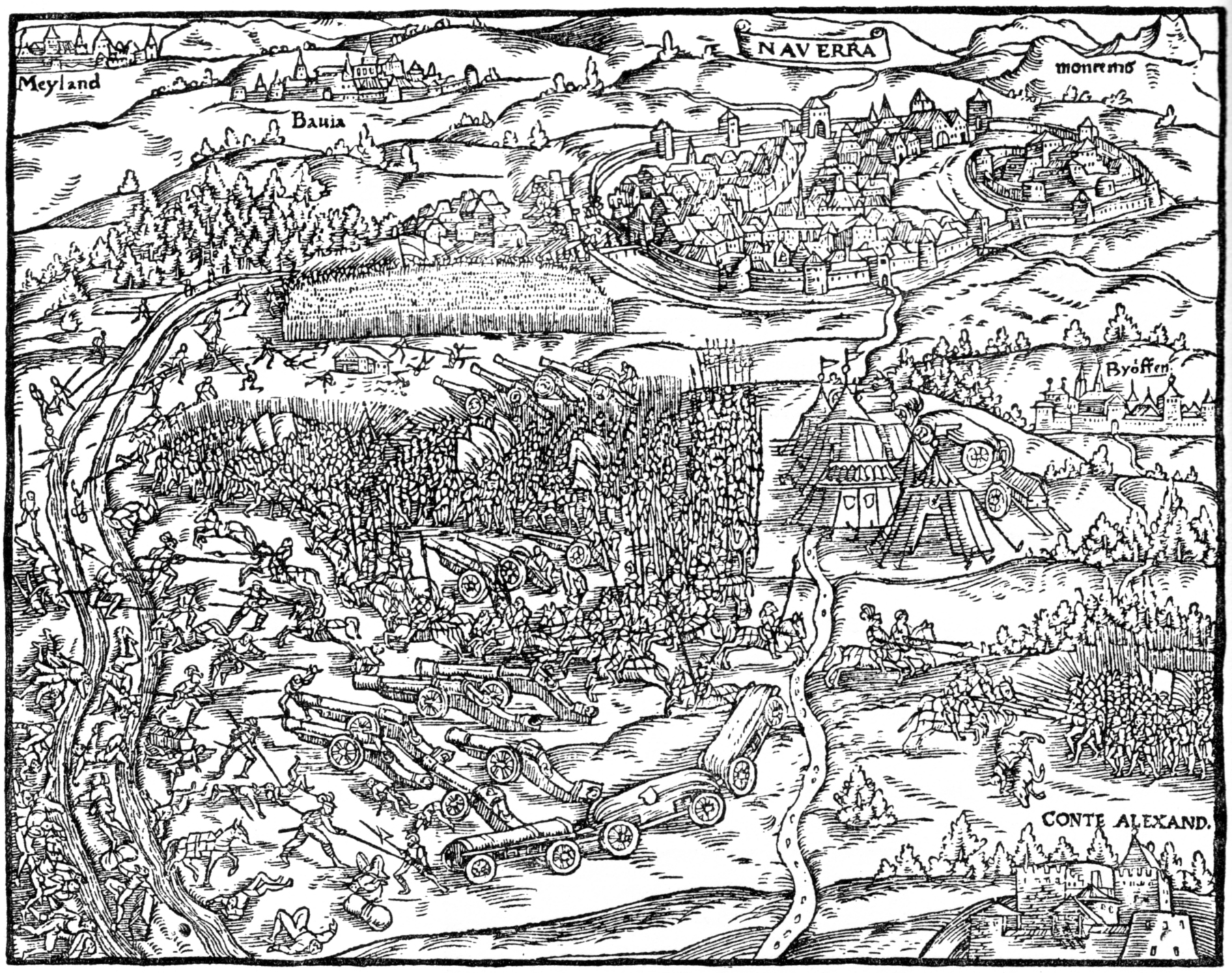
The Battle of Novara marked the pinnacle of Swiss military supremacy (illustration from Johann Stumpf's chronicle, 1548)

The early contingents of Swiss mercenary pikemen organized themselves rather differently than the cantonal forces. In the cantonal forces, their armies were usually divided into the Vorhut (vanguard), Gewalthut (center) and Nachhut (rearguard), generally of different sizes. In mercenary contingents, although they could conceivably draw up in three similar columns if their force was of sufficient size, more often they simply drew up in one or two huge columns which deployed side by side, forming the center of the army in which they served.

Likewise, their tactics were not quite similar to those used by the Swiss cantons in their brilliant tactical victories of the Burgundian Wars and Swabian War, in which they relied on maneuver at least as much as the brute force of the attack columns. In mercenary service they became much less likely to resort to outmaneuvering the enemy and relied more on a straightforward steamroller assault of the phalanx formation.

Such deep pike columns could crush lesser infantry in close combat and were invulnerable to the effects of a cavalry charge, but they were vulnerable to firearms if they could be immobilized, as seen in the Battle of Marignano. The Swiss mercenaries deployed bows, crossbows, handguns and artillery of their own, however these always remained very subsidiary to the pike and halberd square. Despite the proven armour-penetration capability of firearms, they were also very inaccurate, slow-loading, and susceptible to damp conditions, and did not fit well with the fast-paced attack tactics used by the Swiss mercenary pike forces. The Spanish invention of the armor piercing arquebus leading to the later tercios formation changed the optimal war tactics.

The Swiss remained primarily pikemen throughout the sixteenth century. After that period they adopted similar infantry formations and tactics to other units in the armies in which they served. They began to deviate from their previously unique tactics, and they took a normal place in the battle line amongst the other infantry units.

== End of military ascendancy ==
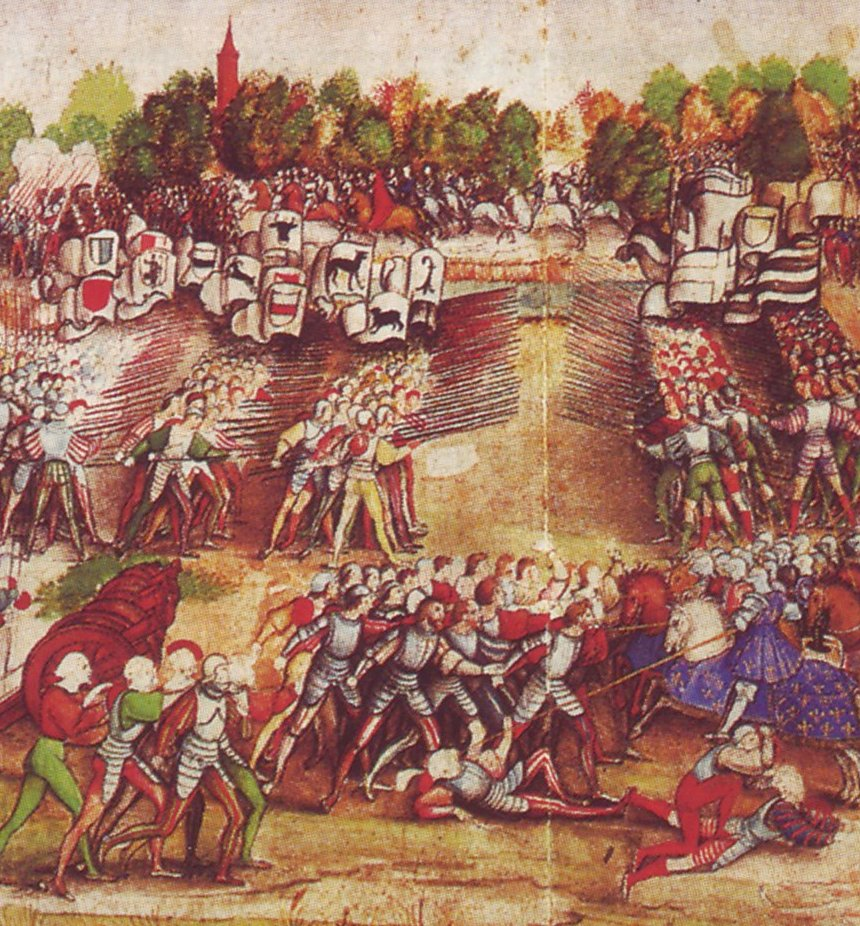
The Swiss (on the left) assault the Landsknecht mercenaries in the French lines at the Battle of Marignano

In the end, as proven at Marignano and Bicocca, the mass pike attack columns of the Swiss mercenaries proved to be too vulnerable to gunpowder weapons as firearms technology advanced, especially arquebusiers and artillery deployed on prepared ground (e.g., earthworks) and properly supported by other arms. These arquebusiers and heavy cannons scythed down the close-packed ranks of the Swiss squares in bloody heaps—at least, as long as the Swiss attack could be bogged down by earthworks or cavalry charges, and the vulnerable arquebusiers were backed up by melee infantry—pikemen, halberdiers, and/or swordsmen (Spanish sword-and-buckler men or the Doppelsöldner wielding the Zweihänder)—to defend them if necessary from the Swiss in close combat.

Other stratagems could also take the Swiss pikemen at a disadvantage. For instance, the Spanish rodeleros, also known as sword-and-buckler men, armed with steel rodelas and espadas and often wearing a helmet and a breastplate, were much better armed and armored for man-to-man close quarters combat. They could defeat the Swiss pike square by dashing under their unwieldy pikes and stabbing them.

This tactic operated in support of allied pike squares and required the opposing pike square to be fully engaged in the chaos of the push of pike. Swiss pike columns that retained good formation were often able to beat back Spanish rodeleros with impunity, such as in the Battle of Seminara, in which the Swiss pike were heavily outnumbered.

Despite the end of their supremacy after the Battle of Pavia, the Swiss pike-armed mercenaries continued to be amongst the most capable close order infantry in Europe throughout the remainder of the sixteenth century. This was demonstrated by their battlefield performances in the service of the French monarchy during the French Wars of Religion, in particular at the Battle of Dreux, where a block of Swiss pikemen held the Huguenot army until the Catholic cavalry were able to counterattack.

== Capitulations and treaties ==
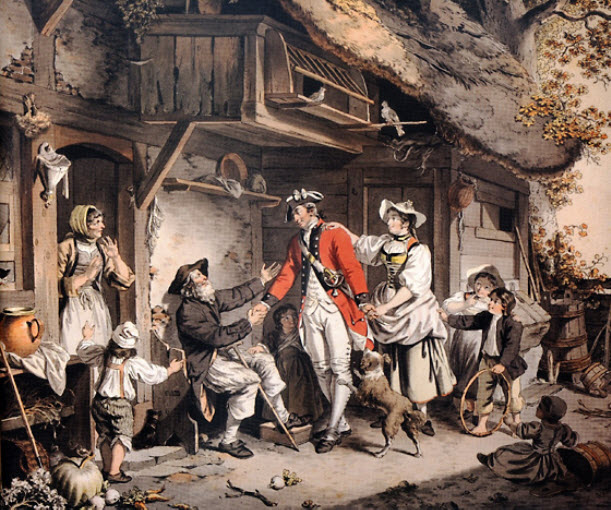
Return of the Swiss soldier by Sigmund Freudenberger, c. 1780

During the period of formalization of the employment of Swiss mercenaries in organized bodies from the late 16th century on, customary capitulations existed between employing powers and the Swiss cantons or noble families assembling and supplying these troops. Such contracts would generally cover specific details such as the numbers, quality, pay rates and equipment of recruits. Provisions were commonly made that Swiss soldiers would only serve under officers of their own nationality, would be subject to Swiss laws, would carry their own flags and would not be employed in campaigns that would bring them into conflict with Swiss in the service of another country.

It has been claimed that such contracts might also contain a commitment that Swiss units would be returned if the confederation came under attack. However, surviving capitulations from the 16th and 17th centuries are not known to contain provisions to this effect.

With the passing of the amendment to the Swiss Constitution of 1874 banning the recruitment of Swiss citizens by foreign states, such contractual relations ceased. Military alliances had already been banned under the Swiss constitution of 1848, though troops still served abroad when obliged by treaties. One such example were the Swiss regiments serving under Francis II of the Two Sicilies, who defended Gaeta in 1860 during the Italian War of Unification. This marked the end of an era.

== Service by country ==
=== France ===
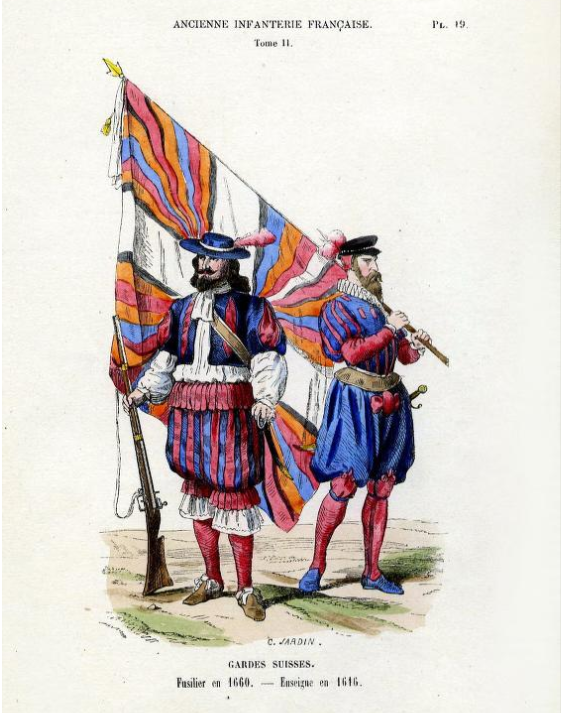
Fusilier and ensign of the Swiss Guards (Gardes suisses) of the King of France during the 17th century

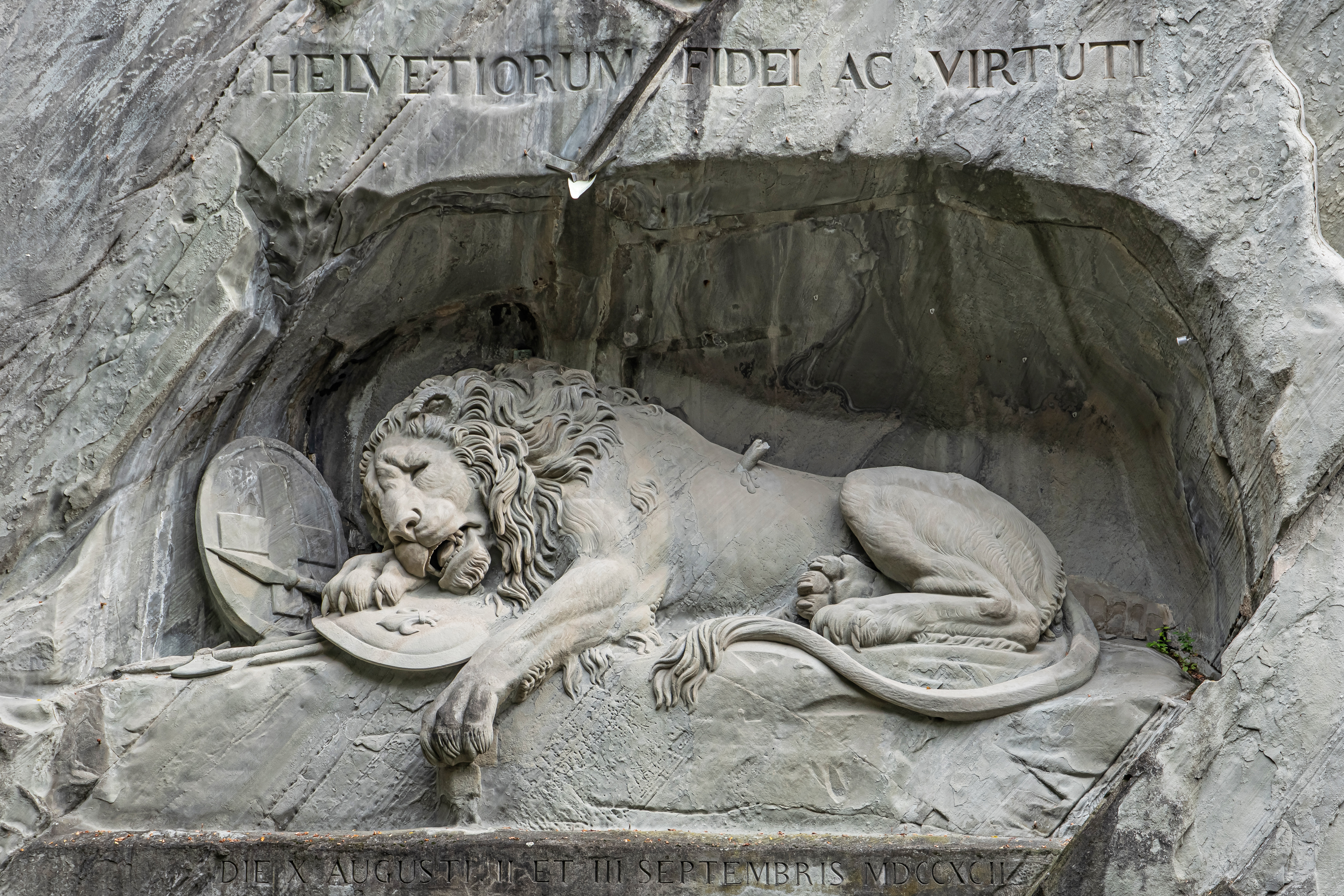
The Lion Monument in Lucerne, Switzerland commemorates the Swiss Guards who died during the insurrection of 10 August 1792.

Swiss soldiers continued to serve as valued mercenaries with a number of European armies from the seventeenth to the nineteenth centuries, in spite of extensive changes in tactics, drill and weapons. The most consistent and largest-scale employer of these troops was the French army, where the Swiss formed an elite part of the infantry. The Swiss Guards regiment, the most senior of the twelve Swiss mercenary regiments in French service, was essentially identical to the French Guards in organization and equipment, other than wearing a red uniform as opposed to the blue coats of the French corps. The Swiss adopted the musket in increasingly large numbers as the seventeenth century wore on, and abandoned the pike, their ancient trademark, altogether at around the same time as other troops in the French army, circa 1700. They also served in the New World: Samuel De Champlain's map of the Île Sainte-Croix (Saint Croix Island) settlement shows a barracks for the Swiss.

The Swiss mercenaries were recruited according to contracts (capitulations) between the French monarchy and Swiss cantons or individual noble families. By 1740 more than 12,000 Swiss soldiers were in French service. During the remainder of the eighteenth century, Swiss numbers varied according to need, reaching a peak of 20,000 during the Austrian War of Succession and falling to 12,300 after 1763. In addition to the direct military value of employing Swiss in French service, a political purpose was achieved through the extension of French diplomatic and commercial influence over the neighbouring cantons.

The Swiss soldier was paid at a higher level than his French counterpart but was subject to a harsher disciplinary code, administered by his own officers. The basis of recruitment varied according to regiment – in some units recruits were drawn exclusively from the Swiss inhabitants of specific cantons while in others German or French volunteers were accepted to make up for shortfalls in the number of available Swiss.

During the latter part of the 18th century, increasing reliance was placed on recruiting from the "children of the regiment" – the sons of Swiss soldiers who had married French women and stayed in France after their term of service had ended. The effect was to partially break down barriers between the Swiss and the French population amongst whom they were garrisoned. On the eve of the French Revolution the log-book of one Swiss regiment expressed concern that Franco-Swiss recruits were becoming prone to desertion as general discontent spread. French-speaking Swiss soldiers were generally to prove more susceptible to revolutionary propaganda than their German-speaking colleagues.

At the outbreak of the French Revolution the Swiss troops were, as at least nominal foreigners, still considered more reliable than their French counterparts in a time of civil unrest. In April 1791 the nominal strength of the Swiss line regiments in French service was 11,429 men with a further 2,330 in the Swiss Guards. Swiss regiments made up a significant proportion of the royal troops summoned to Paris by Louis XVI in early July 1789. A detachment of 32 Swiss grenadiers from the Salis-Samade Regiment under Ludwig von Flüe was sent to reinforce the garrison of the Bastille prison, shortly before it was besieged by the revolutionary crowd.

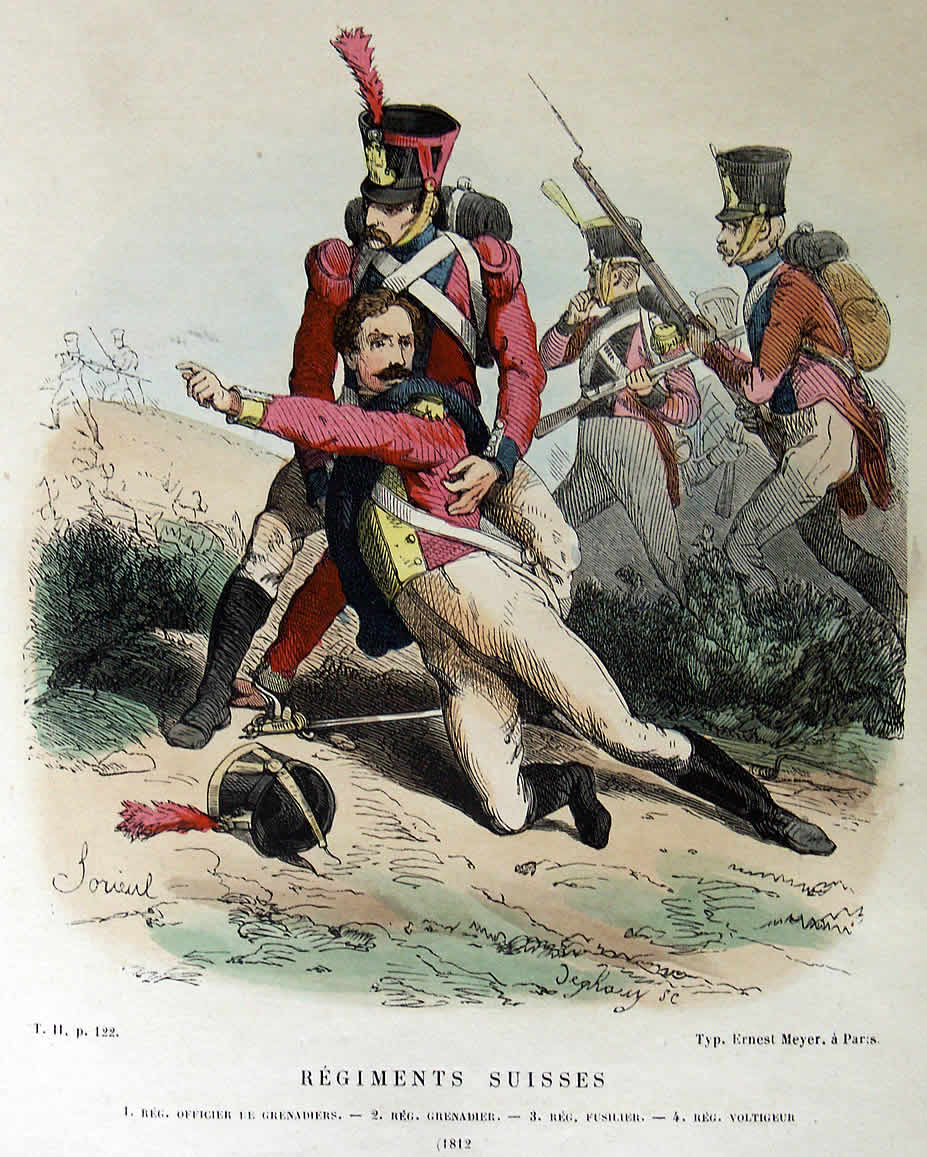
Swiss soldiers of Napoleon's Grande Armée during the Napoleonic Wars

The Swiss and other royal troops were subsequently withdrawn to their frontier garrisons. Over the next three years The Ernest Regiment in particular faced a series of clashes with local citizens, culminating in a two-day battle with Marseilles' militia in 1791. This indication of growing popular resentment against the Swiss caused the Canton of Berne to recall the disarmed regiment. Another Swiss regiment, the Châteauvieux, played a major part in the Nancy affair (mutiny) of 1790 and 23 of its soldiers were executed, after trial by their own Swiss officers.

The Swiss Guard remained loyal and was massacred on 10 August 1792, when the mob attacked the Tuileries Palace, although Louis XVI had already left the building. The eleven Swiss regiments of line infantry were disbanded under a decree passed by the French Assembly on 20 August 1792. Over three thousand Swiss soldiers transferred individually to French units and continued in service. However, many of the rank and file returned to Switzerland, where measures had to be taken to provide them with relief and reintegration into the rural society from which most had been drawn.

Following the French invasion of Switzerland in 1798, a project to raise six demi-brigades of Swiss infantry for French service was initiated. However, recruitment proved difficult and by May 1799 only a quarter of the intended establishment of 18,000 had been raised. Napoleon authorized the recruitment of a Swiss infantry regiment for French service in July 1805. A further three infantry regiments were created in October 1807, each including an artillery company. He specified that these newly raised Swiss units should comprise only citizens of Switzerland without "mingling in deserters or other foreigners".

The Swiss regiments fought well both in Spain (where they clashed at the Battle of Bailén with Swiss troops in the Spanish Army) and in Russia. During the retreat from Moscow Swiss losses amounted to 80% of their original numbers. The Swiss were allowed to keep the distinctive red coats which had distinguished them prior to 1792, with different facings identifying each regiment.

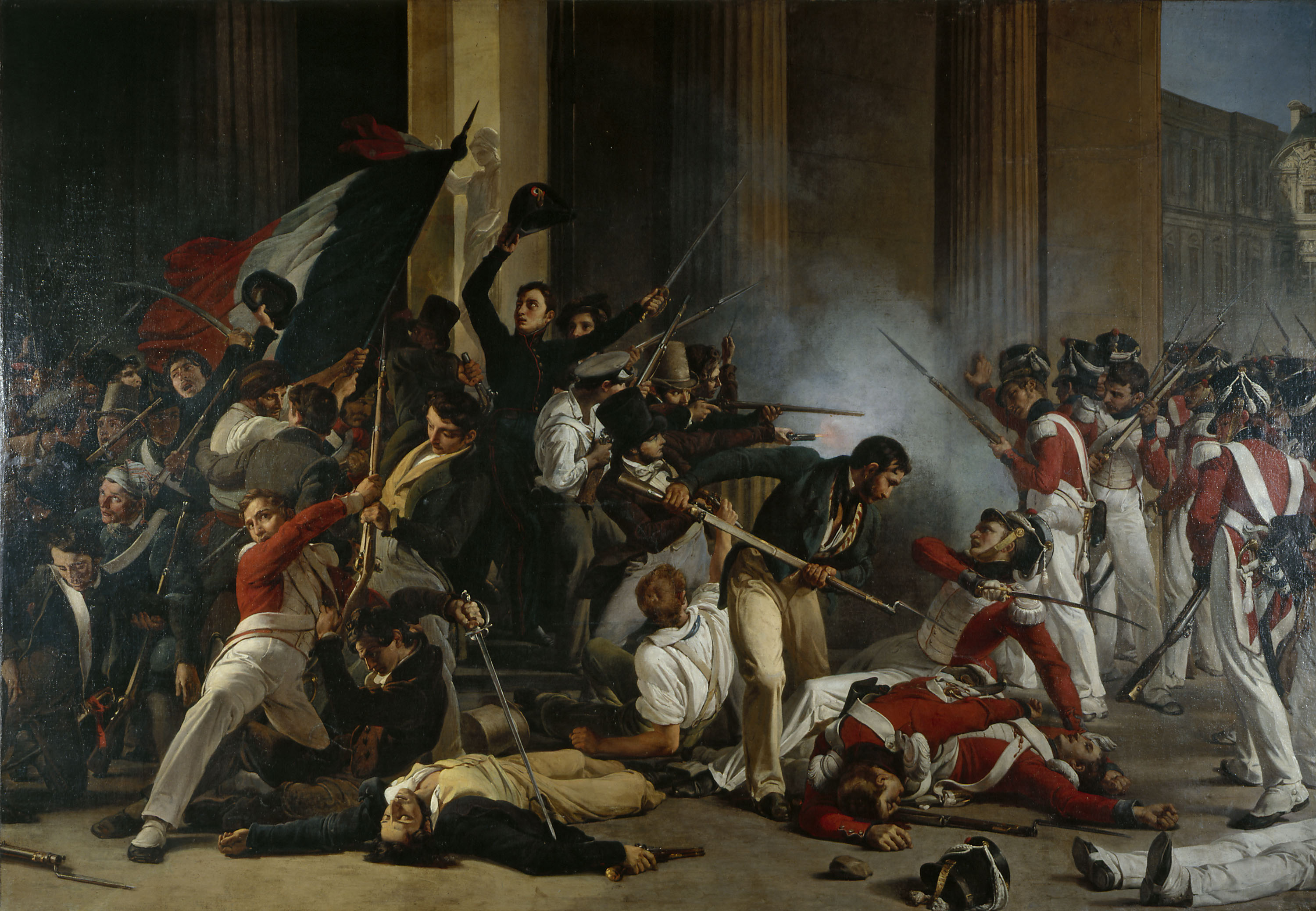
Swiss soldiers of Charles X's Royal Guard defending the Louvre Palace during the July Revolution

During the first Bourbon Restoration of 1814–1815, the grenadier companies of the by now under-strength four Swiss regiments undertook ceremonial guard duties in Paris. Upon Napoleon's return from Elba in 1815, the serving Swiss units were recalled to Switzerland on the grounds that a new contract signed with the government of Louis XVIII had now been rendered void. Still, one composite regiment of Napoleon's Swiss veterans fought at Wavre during the Hundred Days.

After the second Bourbon Restoration, a final capitulation was signed in 1816 for the recruitment of six Swiss regiments, four for the line infantry and two for the Royal Guard, with a nominal strength of 14,000 men. All Swiss units were disbanded following the final overthrow of the Bourbon monarchy in the Revolution of 1830, where about three hundred Swiss soldiers were killed in the defense of the Fontainebleau and Louvre palaces.

=== Spain ===
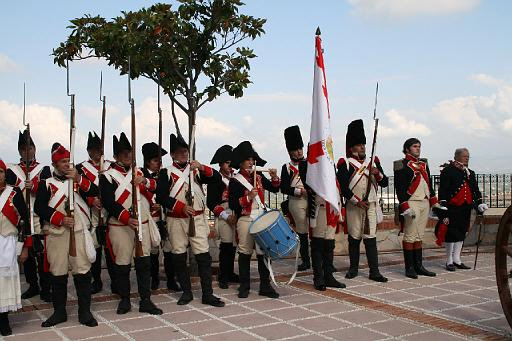
Historical reenactors portraying the Spanish Army's 3rd Swiss Regiment Reding

Another major employer of Swiss mercenaries from the later 16th century on was Spain. After the Protestant Reformation, Switzerland was split along religious lines between Protestant and Catholic cantons. Swiss mercenaries from the Catholic cantons were thereafter increasingly likely to be hired for service in the armies of Habsburg Spain in the late 16th century. The first regularly embodied Swiss regiment in the Spanish Army was that of Walter Roll of Uri (a Catholic canton), formed in 1574 for service in the Eighty Years' War. By the middle of the 17th century, Philip III and his successor Philip IV had signed capitulations for a dozen Swiss regiments. These were deployed in the Portuguese Restoration War, the Reapers' War, and the Nine Years' War in the latter half of the century.

Swiss soldiers in Spanish service saw action in Italy during the War of the Quadruple Alliance in 1718, in North Africa during the expedition to Oran and Mers el-Kebir in 1732, and in Sicily and Naples during the War of the Polish Succession in 1734–1735. In the War of the Austrian Succession, 30,000 Swiss mercenaries from five regiments fought for the Spanish Crown in Lombardy, Savoy and the County of Nice. During the second half of the 18th century, Spain employed four Swiss regiments which took part in all of its campaigns, including the invasion of Portugal in 1762, the invasion of Algiers in 1775 and the American Revolutionary War.

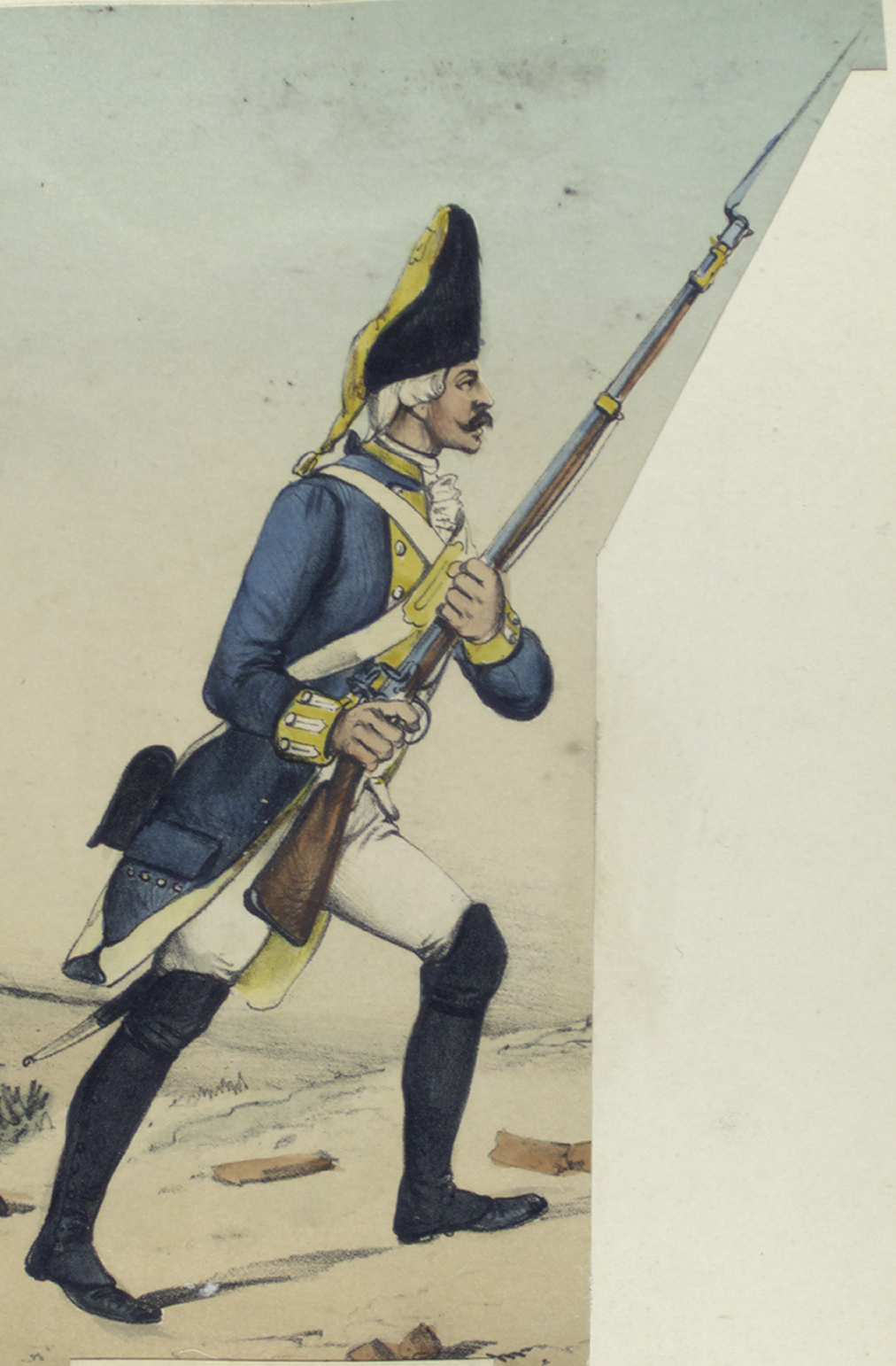
Grenadier of the Betschart Regiment, 1789. The Swiss regiments of Spain were distinguished by their blue coats, in contrast to the white uniforms of the Spanish line infantry.

By the 1790s there were about 13,000 men making up the Swiss contingents in a total Spanish Army of 137,000. The practice of recruiting directly from the Catholic cantons was however disrupted by the outbreak of the French Revolutionary Wars. Recruiting agents substituted Germans, Austrians and Italians and in some regiments the genuine Swiss element dwindled to 100 or less. Spain's Swiss units served against the French in the War of the Pyrenees, and one Swiss regiment (Betschart) formed part of the Allied army at the Siege of Toulon in 1793. Their final role in Spanish service was against the French in the Peninsular War, in which the five Swiss regiments (Rüttimann, Jann, Reding, Schwaller and Courten) mostly stayed loyal to their Spanish employers. At the Battle of Bailén in 1808, the Swiss regiments pressed into French service defected back to the 3rd Swiss Regiment Reding under Theodor von Reding. The Swiss regiments suffered heavy losses in the following years of the Peninsular War, numbering only a few hundred men by 1812. They were finally disbanded in 1823 during the Trienio liberal.

=== Netherlands ===
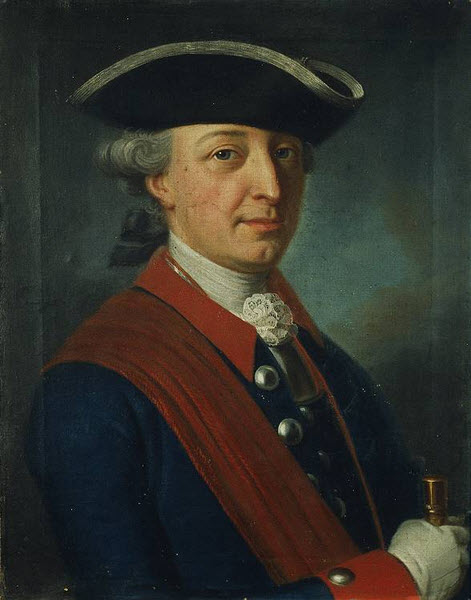
Colonel Viktor Steiger (1727–1822), a Swiss officer in Dutch service (portrait by Emanuel Handmann, 1767)

The Dutch employed many Swiss units from the late 17th century until the 19th century. After initial attempts by the Dutch Republic to raise Swiss regiments during the Franco-Dutch War failed, the revocation of the Edict of Nantes in 1685 by Louis XIV of France prompted a feeling of common threat among Protestants. In March 1693, the Dutch envoy to Zürich, Petrus Valkenier, concluded a private capitulation with Swiss mercenary Hercules Capol, a Protestant who had left French service in 1685, raising a regiment of 1,600 men from the Grisons for Dutch service. Zürich authorized the recruitment of 800 men the same year. In 1696, the Protestant cantons of Bern and Schaffhausen, as well as the Republic of Geneva and the Principality of Neuchâtel (both Protestant associate states of Switzerland), entered into similar accords with the Netherlands.

In 1700, 11,200 Swiss soldiers served in the Dutch States Army. At the Battle of Malplaquet in 1709, during the War of the Spanish Succession, six Swiss regiments in Dutch pay (Chambrier, Schmid von Grüneck, Hirzel, May, Stürler and Mestral) fought a French army which included Swiss infantry regiments and Louis XIV's Swiss Guards. The fighting was brutal and the Swiss soldiers, ignoring their common origin, gave each other no quarter.

The Republic sent Swiss regiments to Scotland in 1715 and 1745; in 1745, three battalions of the Hirzel Regiment formed part of the Dutch contingent sent to serve in England as allies at the time of the Jacobite rising in Scotland that year. With the threat of a French invasion in 1748, the Netherlands concluded a capitulation with all Protestant cantons (except Basel) in addition to Glarus, Appenzell Ausserrhoden, St. Gallen and Neuchâtel.

The capitulation of 1748 increased to 20,400 the number of Swiss mercenaries in Dutch service, and additional regiments were taken into service, but that year, the War of Austrian Succession ended and three of these regiments were retired from service. In 1749 a regiment of Swiss Guards (Zwitsersche Guardes) was raised, the recruits coming from the ranks of the existing Swiss infantry regiments.

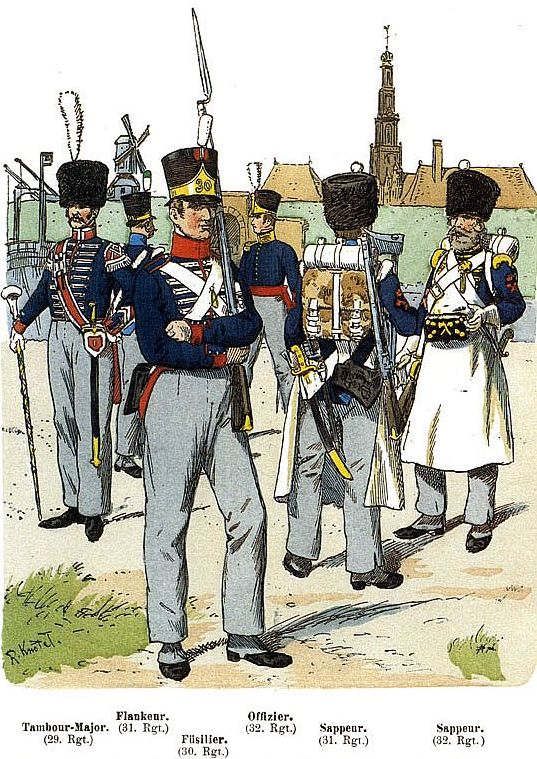
Soldiers of the Swiss regiments in the service of the United Kingdom of the Netherlands, 1815–1828

Swiss mercenaries were also deployed to the Dutch colonies in Asia, Africa, South America and the Caribbean. Louis-Henri Fourgeoud's regiment, which was sent to Berbice in 1763 in response to the Berbice slave rebellion, undertook numerous expeditions against the maroons in neighboring Surinam until 1778. A narrative of the Surinam campaigns, written by John Gabriel Stedman, was later published. Between 4,000 and 5,000 Swiss mercenaries were employed, mostly on an individual basis, by the Dutch East India Company (VOC) for service in the Cape of Good Hope, Ceylon and the Dutch East Indies. In 1781, the Meuron Regiment was hired for VOC service in the Cape Colony. The regiment was later transferred to Ceylon, where it campaigned against the Kingdom of Kandy.

In 1787, the six Swiss regiments in the Dutch States Army numbered a total of 9,600 men. With the abdication of the stadhouder in 1795 and the establishment of the Batavian Republic, all Swiss regiments were disbanded in 1796. After the return of the Prince of Orange in 1813, four regiments of Swiss infantry, numbered 29 to 32 in the line, were raised, of which the 32nd served as a guard regiment performing guard duties at the Royal Palace of Amsterdam after 1815. These units were also disbanded in 1829.

Several Swiss soldiers joined the Royal Netherlands East Indies Army (KNIL) after the Swiss regiments in the Netherlands were dissolved. Like the French Foreign Legion, the KNIL profited from the dissolution of Swiss units across Europe during the 19th century. In the 1850s, some 1,200 men from the Swiss regiments of the Kingdom of the Two Sicilies entered KNIL service, similarly to 240 mercenaries from the short-lived British Swiss Legion, disbanded in 1856. Many of the Swiss participated in mutinies against their Dutch superiors at Java in 1860. The Dutch government then suspended their recruitment, only to resume it in 1866.By the start of the First World War, about 7,600 Swiss mercenaries had served throughout the Dutch colonial empire. A number of the (from origin Swiss) mercenaries have been distinguished with the decoration of the Dutch Military Order of William.

=== Savoy ===
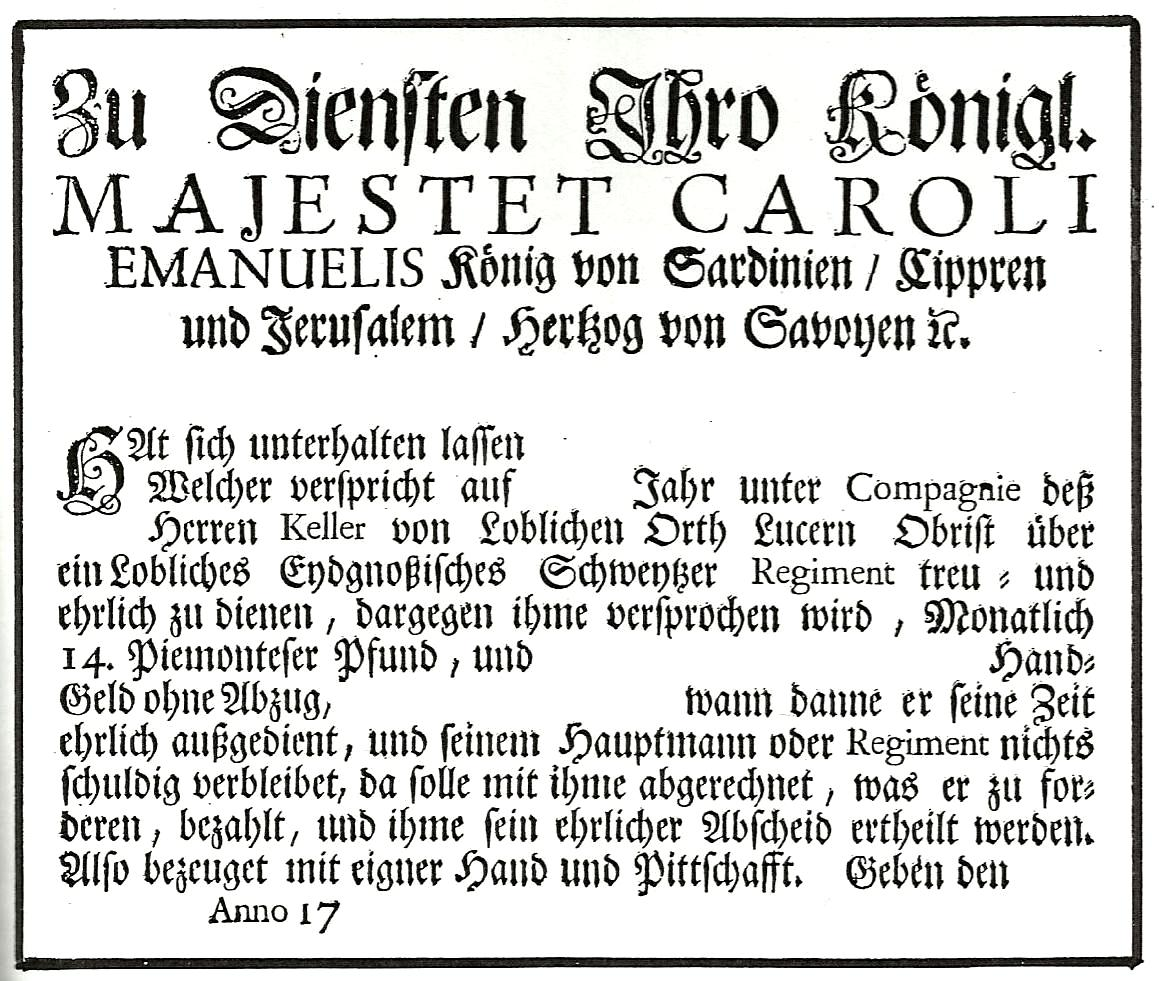
A recruitment notice for the Keller Regiment of Lucerne, a Swiss regiment in the service of King Charles Emmanuel III of Sardinia, 1740s

The first Swiss mercenaries in the service of the House of Savoy (rulers of the Duchy of Savoy and later the Kingdom of Sardinia) were recruited in 1577 through a capitulation signed by Emmanuel Philibert, Duke of Savoy and the Catholic cantons of Lucerne, Uri, Schwyz, Unterwalden, Zug and Fribourg. In 1579, Emmanuel Philibert expanded his personal guard with a Swiss company, initially composed of seventy soldiers and three officers. His successor, Charles Emmanuel, established the unit as the Swiss Guard (Guardia Svizzera), also called the "Hundred Swiss" (Cento Svizzeri) after the eponymous French unit. The company's size varied between 175 men in 1597 and 112 in 1774. In addition to the Swiss cantons, Savoy employed a number of units from the Valais, a Catholic associate state of Switzerland, starting with the Kalbermatten Regiment in 1615.

Swiss Protestants, mostly from Vaud and Bern, entered Sardinian service in the 18th century. Several Swiss regiments were taken into Savoyard service during the War of the Spanish Succession, including the La Reine, Alt, Lombach, Frid, Schmid, and Reding regiments. Due to the French invasion of the Duchy of Savoy, most of the regiments were scattered before they could fully assemble. They served with distinction at the Siege of Turin.

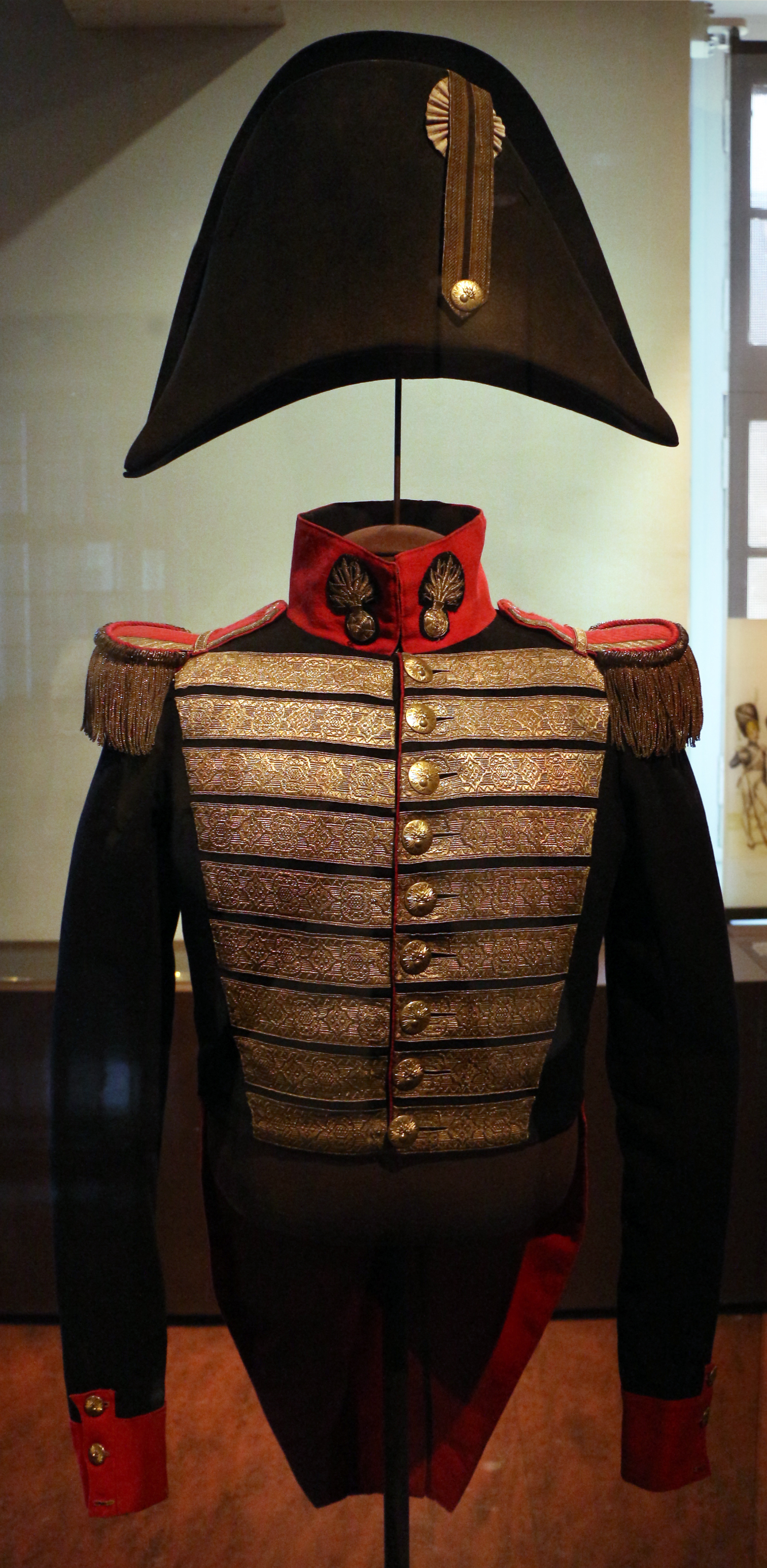
Uniform of Sardinian Swiss Guard from 1817 to 1830

The War of the Polish Succession saw a further surge in Swiss mercenaries, now in the service of the Kingdom of Sardinia, with the recruitment of new units such as the Guibert, Du Pâquier, Kyd, and Donatz regiments, most of which were disbanded shortly after the war. The Swiss also fought for the King of Sardinia in the War of the Austrian Succession, suffering heavy losses at the Siege of Villafranca and distinguishing themselves at the battles of Madonna dell'Olmo and Assietta. By the end of the war in 1748, about 10,600 Swiss soldiers were employed by Sardinia.

Three new Swiss regiments, largely consisting of soldiers from the recently disbanded Swiss units in French service, were raised for the Sardinian Army in 1793. Each regiment was reduced to a single battalion in 1797, following Sardinia's defeat in the Italian campaigns of the French Revolutionary Wars, and later passed into the service of the French Republic in 1798 as the Helvetic Legions in Italy. After his return to Turin in 1814, King Victor Emmanuel I considered raising six Swiss regiments from the cantons of Ticino, Vaud, Bern and the Grisons. Due to budgetary reasons, he was forced to sign the capitulation for only one regiment (Christ) from the Grisons, which never reached its nominal strength and was disbanded in 1816. The Hundred Swiss of the Guard, who were also disbanded in 1798 and restored in 1814, continued to perform their duties at the Royal Palace of Turin until their final dissolution in 1832.

=== Britain ===
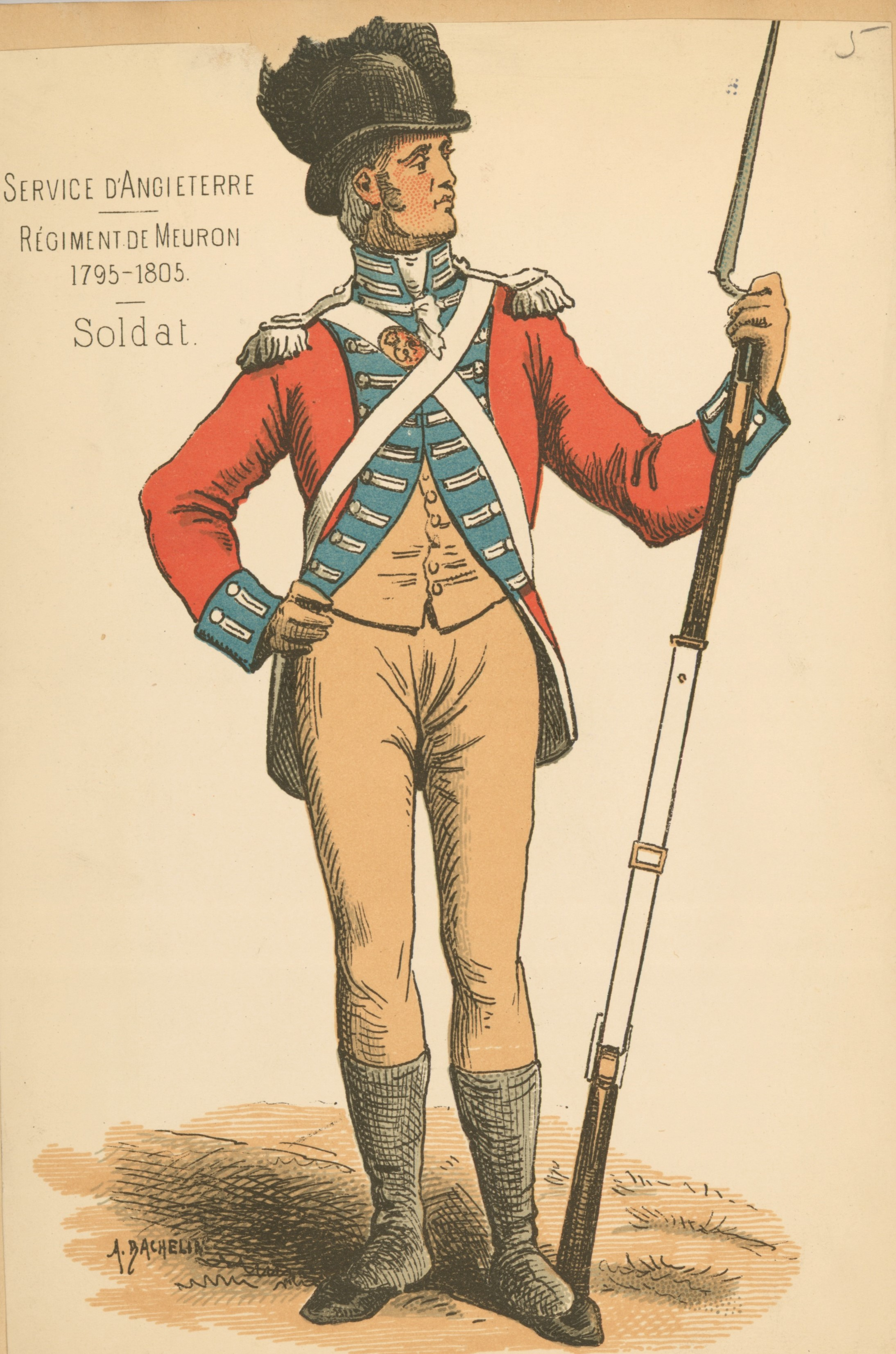
A private of the Regiment de Meuron between 1795 and 1805

The Kingdom of England began to recruit Swiss mercenaries after the Glorious Revolution of 1689. A first capitulation was signed in 1690 between England and the Protestant cantons of Zürich, Bern, Glarus, Schaffhausen and Appenzell Ausserrhoden, as well as the city of St. Gallen. Starting in the 1750s, Swiss soldiers also served in the armies of the British East India Company (EIC). Between 1751 and 1754, 518 mercenaries, mostly Swiss and Germans, were sent to the East Indies.

The EIC's Swiss contingent was increased in 1757 by four regiments recruited by Jacques Marc Prevost, a Genevan officer of the Royal American Regiment. During the Seven Years' War, the Swiss were numerous among the auxiliary troops from continental Europe that fought in the war's Indian theater on behalf of the EIC. Some Swiss mercenaries reached important posts within the company and amassed considerable wealth, notably through looting.

Another important theater of war in the 18th-century was North America, where Swiss mercenaries in the British Army served in the French and Indian War. Some, such as Henry Bouquet and Frederick Haldimand (both from the Royal American Regiment), achieved distinction in North America and held high offices in the British colonial administration. In 1781, Charles-Daniel de Meuron, a former colonel of the French Swiss Guards, founded his own mercenary regiment under the name Regiment de Meuron, first serving the Dutch East India Company, and from 1796, the British East India Company. Under British service, the regiment fought in the Mysore campaign of 1799, the Mediterranean campaigns of the Napoleonic Wars and the Peninsular War.

De Watteville's Regiment was a Swiss regiment founded by Louis de Watteville and recruited from regiments that served between 1799 and 1801 in the Austrian army but in British pay. The Swiss soldiers were then transferred to British service. They fought in the Napoleonic Wars, mainly around the Mediterranean. They were based in Malta and then in Egypt from 1801 to 1803, fighting in Sicily and Naples. The regiment fought in the Battle of Maida in Southern Italy in July 1806. Kept up to strength by Spanish and Portuguese recruits from 1811 to 1813, De Watteville's Regiment was involved in the Peninsular War in Spain, defending Cádiz during the Siege of Cádiz.

The Meuron and Watteville regiments both sailed to Canada in 1813 to fight in the War of 1812. De Watteville's Regiment saw action at the Siege of Fort Erie and at the Battle of Fort Oswego. All Swiss units in British service were demobilized in 1816, although in 1815 about 150 of them were hired by the Hudson's Bay Company to fight in the Pemmican War still wearing their British uniforms. A short-lived British Swiss Legion, recruited in the 1850s for the Crimean War, was disbanded in 1856 without having been deployed.

=== Naples ===
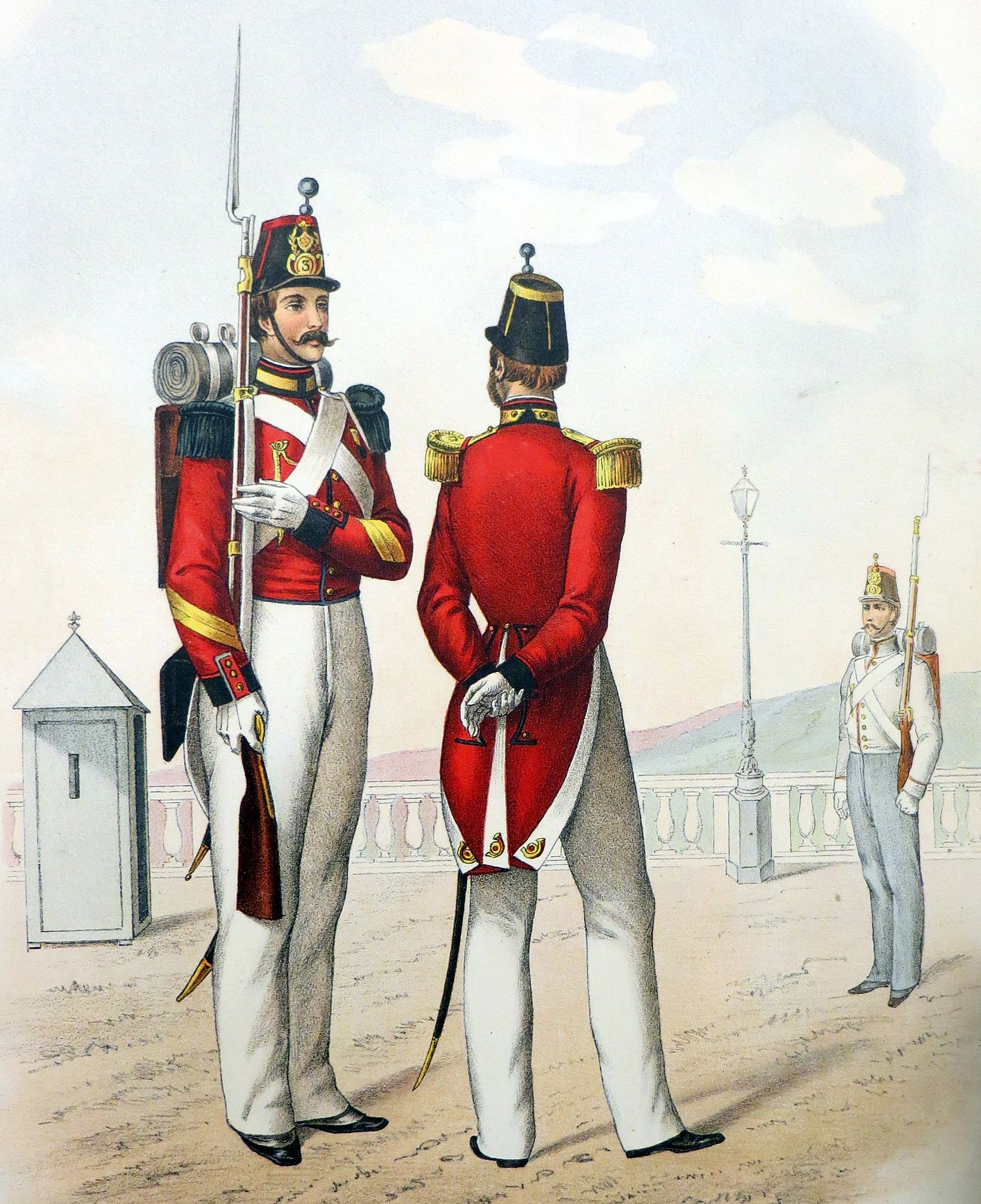
A sergeant and a captain of the Neapolitan Army's 3rd Swiss Regiment, 1845–1859

The permanent employment of Swiss mercenaries by the Kingdom of Naples began with the transfer of the Neapolitan crown to the Spanish Bourbons. In 1731, Philip V of Spain put two of his most experienced Swiss units, the Nideröst and Bessler regiments, at the disposal of his son Charles, Duke of Parma, the future Charles III of Spain. After becoming King of Naples in 1734, Charles raised two new Swiss regiments under the ownership of the Tschudi family of Glarus. The Bessler Regiment was replaced by a regiment belonging to the Jauch family, from Uri.

Three of the regiments were stationed in the city of Naples and the surrounding area, with a fourth garrisoned in Sicily. The Swiss regiments in Neapolitan service, totaling between 6,000 and 7,000 men, remained active until 1789. After their dismissal, several Swiss soldiers joined other foreign regiments and went on to fight the French Revolutionary Army. Others followed King Ferdinand IV into exile in 1799, following his overthrow by the Parthenopean Republic, and again from 1806 to 1815 during Napoleonic rule in Naples.

After his restoration in 1815, Ferdinand, now monarch of the Kingdom of the Two Sicilies, negotiated with the Swiss Federal Diet and concluded treaties in 1824 with the cantons of Lucerne, Uri, Unterwalden and Appenzell Innerrhoden, and in 1825 with Solothurn and Fribourg, for the formation of two Swiss regiments. A third regiment were raised in 1826, through a treaty with Valais, the Grisons and Schwyz, and fourth by Bern in 1829. These capitulations, concluded for a period of thirty years, offered commercial advantages. The Swiss regiments went through unrest under the reign of Ferdinand II, with frequent changes of garrison.

During the Revolutions of 1848–1849, Swiss mercenaries were deployed in two campaigns against the revolutionary Roman Republic and took part in the suppression of the Sicilian Revolution. Their behaviour on this occasion was criticized within Switzerland, which led the Federal Council in 1851 to ban all recruitment for foreign service and to demand the removal of the cantonal and national coats of arms from regimental flags. After Ferdinand II's death in 1859, the Swiss regiments in the Two Sicilies were officially disbanded.

=== Venice ===
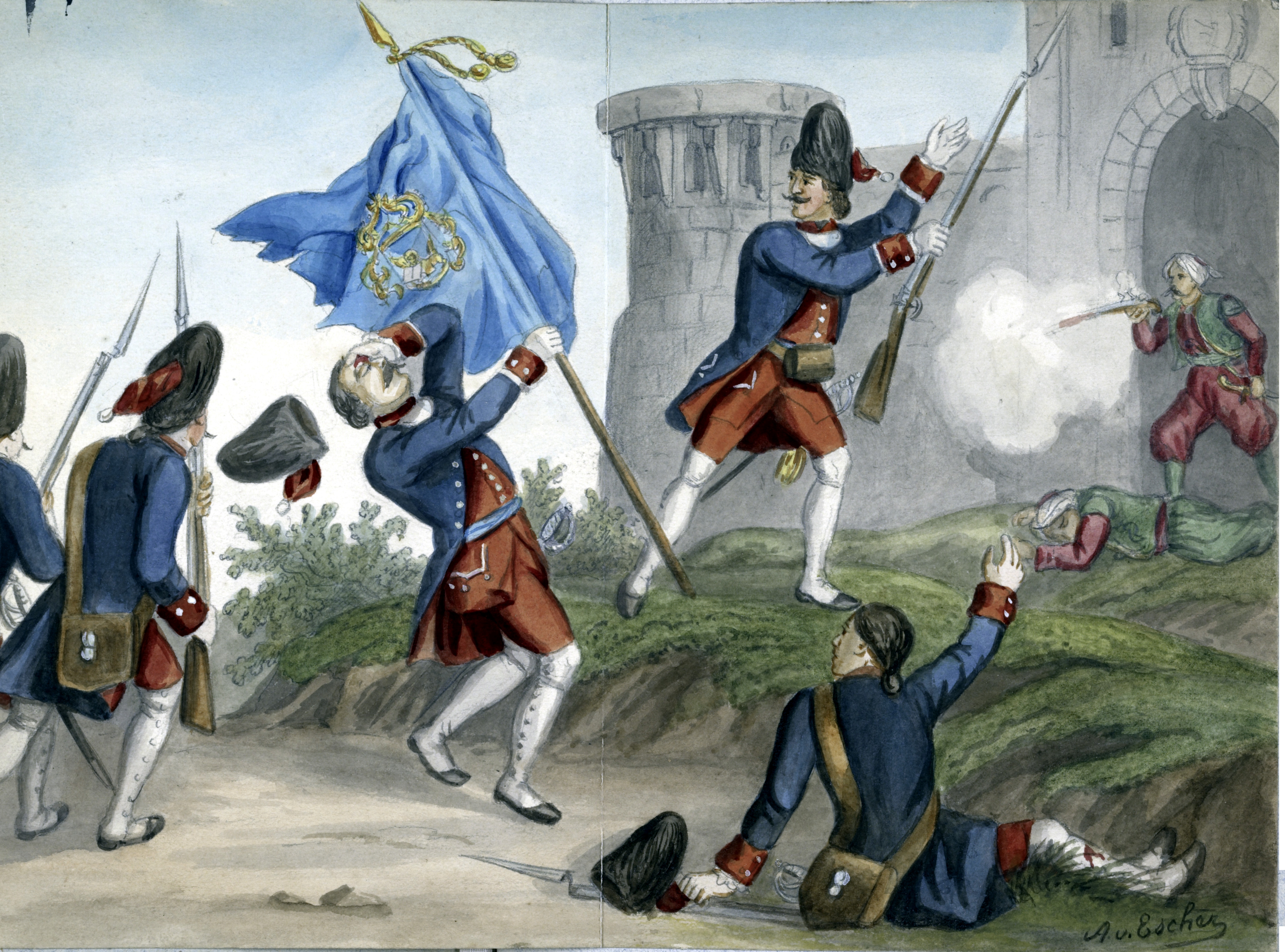
Swiss grenadiers of the Müller Regiment attacking an Ottoman fort during the Ottoman–Venetian War (1714–1718)

Mercenaries from Switzerland and the Grisons were individually employed by the Republic of Venice as early as the 15th century. In 1500, a capitulation authorized Venice to recruit 4,000 men from the Grisons, in return for Venice's support at the Battle of Calven the previous year. A treaty signed in 1560 raised a Swiss regiment of twelve companies, under the future landammann of Nidwalden, Melchior Lussy, for Venetian service. Another regiment, belonging to the Salis family of the Val Bregaglia, was recruited by the Republic around the same time.

In 1571, a contingent of six hundred Catholics from the Grisons served at the Battle of Lepanto as rowers in the Venetian Navy. An alliance with the cantons of Zürich and Bern, signed in 1615, served as the basis for several 17th-century capitulations between Venice and the Swiss. Two Swiss units, the Werdtmüller and Weiss regiments, were formed in 1648 and 1658, respectively, for service in Venetian Dalmatia. The Büeler Regiment, from Solothurn, took part in the Cretan War against the Ottoman Empire, serving in Dalmatia from 1652 to 1664.

In 1687, a Swiss regiment of 2,500 men, recruited from the Catholic cantons of Central Switzerland, Solothurn, and the city of St. Gallen, was raised for Venetian service in the Morean War. Led by Sebastian Peregrin Schmid of Uri, the Swiss set sail from Venice in May 1688, arriving at the Peloponnese peninsula (then known as Morea) about a month later. In early July, the regiment was transferred to the Greek island of Negroponte, where it had orders to seize the town of the same name from the Ottomans. The Venetian army suffered enormous losses due to fighting and disease, and the Siege of Negroponte had to be lifted in October 1688. The remaining two hundred Swiss soldiers were then transferred to Lepanto.

Poor treatment by the Venetian commanders and disputes among Swiss officers further aggravated the situation, and the regiment was finally disbanded in 1691. The outcome of the Negroponte expedition and overdue payments strained Venetian relations with the Swiss, particularly the Catholic cantons, in the late 17th century. Nevertheless, Venice continued to employ Swiss regiments, concluding a new capitulation with the Protestant cantons of Bern and Zürich, as well as the Grisons, in 1706. Swiss mercenaries served the Republic of Venice until 1719.

=== Others ===
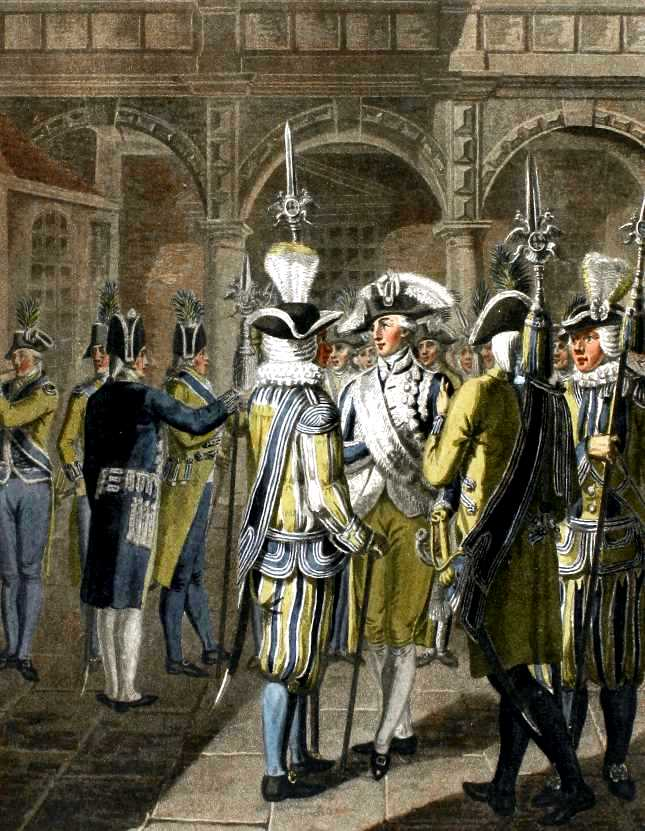
Members of the Swiss Guard (Schweizer Garde) of Frederick Augustus III, Elector of Saxony, 1806

Swiss mercenaries were also employed at various dates by Prussia, Brandenburg, Genoa, Portugal, Tuscany, Poland, Saxony, Denmark, Sweden, Russia, Egypt and Bavaria, among other states.

== Modern times ==
Since 1859, only one Swiss mercenary unit has been permitted, the Vatican's Swiss Guard, which has been protecting the pope for the last five centuries, dressed in colourful uniforms, supposedly drawn by Michelangelo, reminiscent of the Swiss mercenary's heyday. Despite its being prohibited, individual Swiss citizens carried on the tradition of foreign military service into the twentieth century. This included 800 Swiss volunteers who fought with the Republican International Brigades during the Spanish Civil War, incurring heavy losses.

Swiss citizens also served in the German Wehrmacht during the Second World War, although purely on an individual and voluntary basis. At least 2,000 Swiss fought for Germany during the war, mostly from the German-speaking cantons of Bern and Zürich, and many of them had dual German nationality. Besides the Wehrmacht, some joined the SS, particularly the 6th Mountain Division. Due to Switzerland's neutral status, their allegiances were considered illegal and in 1943 the Federal Council decided that those who cooperated with Germany would be stripped of their nationality. By 1945, there were only 29 such cases. A number of Swiss citizens were taken prisoner by the Soviet Union while fighting on the Eastern Front.

The plot of George Bernard Shaw's comedy Arms and the Man (and of the operetta The Chocolate Soldier based on it) is focused on a fictional Swiss mercenary serving in the 1885 Serbo-Bulgarian War; there is, however, no evidence of actual such mercenaries in that war.

== Notable Swiss mercenaries ==
- Louis-Auguste-Augustin d'Affry
- Karl Josef von Bachmann
- Pierre Victor de Besenval de Brünstatt
- Henry Bouquet
- Jean Victor Constant de Rebecque
- Samuel Constant de Rebecque
- Johann Ludwig von Erlach
- Wilhelm Frölich
- Urs Graf
- Frederick Haldimand
- Ludwig Pfyffer
- Theodor von Reding
- Caspar Röist
- Kaspar von Silenen
- Sebastian Peregrin Zwyer

== See also ==
- Military history of Switzerland
- Beresinalied
- Mal du Suisse, a feeling of intense homesickness common with Swiss mercenaries
- Swiss Army
