= Theodor von Reding =

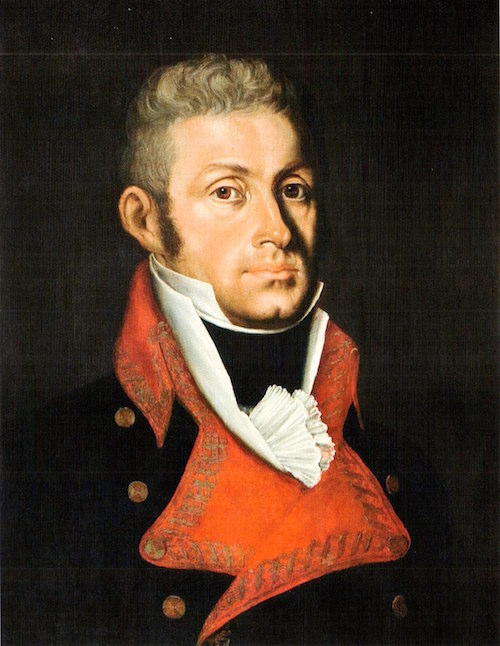
Theodor von Reding

Theodor von Reding (5 July 1755 – 23 April 1809) was a Swiss mercenary who served in the Spanish Army. He was a governor and military commander in Spain during the French Revolutionary Wars and the Peninsular War.

== Biography ==
Reding was born in Schwyz, Switzerland, to Theodor Anton Reding and Magdalena Freuler. His father was a lieutenant-colonel in the Spanish Army, and both of Reding's brothers, Alois von Reding and Nazar von Reding, also served as mercenaries in Spanish service. He joined the Spanish Army at age 14, and was promoted to captain in 1772, to lieutenant-colonel in 1781, and to colonel of a Swiss regiment in 1788. He led troops against the French in Navarre and the Basque Country during the War of the Pyrenees, a theatre of the French Revolutionary Wars, and was wounded in action multiple times. Promoted to brigadier in 1793 and to field marshal in 1795, Reding fought in the War of the Oranges against Portugal.

At the outbreak of the Peninsular War in 1808, Reding was Governor of Málaga. In July 1808 he fought under General Castaños at the Battle of Bailén, where the 3rd Swiss Regiment Reding fought with conspicuous valour. After that, he was appointed Captain General of Catalonia, where he tried to organize the Spanish forces and he was able to obtain 30,000 men for the war. He was wounded at the Battle of Valls against French forces led by Gouvion Saint-Cyr, on 25 February 1809, and died in Tarragona on 23 April from consequences of his wounds.

== Legacy ==
Numerous activities and actions are being carried out currently to honor him. The Historical Recreation Group 3rd Swiss Regiment Reding is one of the biggest events that honor him.
