= Domenico Pino =

Italian army officer (1760–1826)

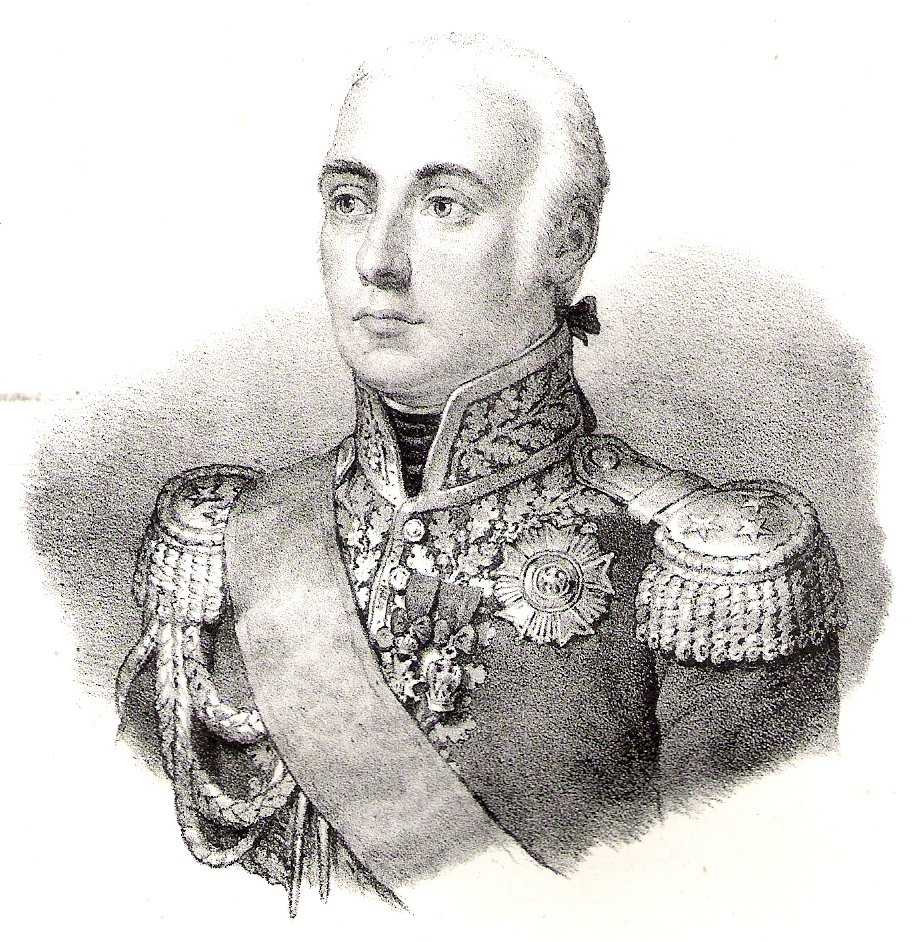
- Born: 8 September 1760; Milan, Duchy of Milan
- Died: 29 March 1826 (aged 65) Cernobbio, Kingdom of Lombardy-Venetia, Austrian Empire
- Allegiance: (Kingdom of Italy (Napoleonic)) Kingdom of Italy
- Service years: (1796–1814)
- Rank: Division General
- Conflicts: French Revolutionary Wars; War of the First Coalition; War of the Second Coalition; Napoleonic Wars; War of the Fourth Coalition; Peninsular War; French invasion of Russia; Battle of Maloyaroslavets
- Spouse: Vittoria Peluso

Domenico Pino (8 September 1760 – 29 March 1826) was an Italian army officer. He served as General of Division in the Kingdom of Italy and in Napoleon's Grande Armée.

== Early life ==
Pino was born on 8 September 1760 in Milan, to Francesco and Margherita Lonati, a scion of a distinguished family. He attended the Collegio Gallio in Como.

== Military career ==
He joined the army of the Duchy of Parma, serving as a captain in the cavalry. He enlisted as a grenadier in the Lombard Legion, formed by Napoleon as part of his Army of Italy in October 1796. Pino was promoted to command a battalion in the Legion only one month later. He was promoted to colonel on 25 February 1797, to brigadier general on 16 December 1798, and to General of Division in 1800, the highest rank in the Legion. His rapid rise was due to his outstanding service in Napoleon's Army of Italy. Captured at Ancona in 1799, he was released on his parole, and so missed the Battle of Marengo in 1800, but was recognised for his service in command of a division in the campaign in Tuscany in 1800 and 1801. His younger brother, Giacomo Pino (born 1 October 1767) served him as an aide-de-camp.

Napoleon renamed the Cisalpine Republic as the Italian Republic in January 1802, and Pino became its Minister of War on 13 August 1804. Pino remained Minister of War when the Republic became the Kingdom of Italy on 17 March 1805. Pino was appointed commander of Napoleon's Italian Guard in 1806, remaining in this post until 1815, although he never commanded the Italian Guards, but was often away, serving overseas. He commanded a division of Italians in Prussia in 1807, and the 2nd (Italian) Division in Spain in 1808, 1809 and 1810. For his service, Pino was created a Count of the Kingdom of Italy on 12 April 1809 and a Count of the French Empire on 9 March 1810.

He commanded the 15th (Italian) Division in the Napoleon's 1812 invasion of Russia. The 15th Division was assigned to the IV Corps, which was largely composed of Italian soldiers, and was commanded by the viceroy of Italy, Eugène de Beauharnais. Pino commanded his division in the Battle of Maloyaroslavets on 24 October 1812, in which his brother Giacomo was killed. Although claimed as a French victory, in that the Russians withdraw from the field, the battle caused Napoleon to take the disastrous decision to retreat from Moscow along the same path as his army had advanced earlier that year. Of 27,000 Italians that invaded Russia, only 1,000 returned.

Pino commanded forces in the defence of Italy in 1813, but was dismissed by the viceroy, Eugène, with whom he had had disagreements in Russia. After Napoleon's abdication in early 1814, Eugène aimed to take the throne of Italy as Napoleon's successor. However, Eugène's ambitions were thwarted by an uprising in Milan on 20 April 1814. Pino was present during the uprising, but there is little evidence of any direct involvement from him in its instigation. Pino was named a member of the provisional government on 22 April, and nominated to command the forces of the Kingdom of Italy. Eugène signed the Convention of Mantua on 23 April, and northern Italy returned to Austrian rule on 28 April. The Emperor of Austria offered Pino the position of Feldmarschalleutnant (Lieutenant-General), but he declined.

== Later life and death ==
Pino retired to Cernobbio near Lake Como. There, his wife, Vittoria Peluso (formerly a ballerina known professionally as Pelusina) had inherited the palatial Villa del Garrovo from her first husband, the Marquis Calderari; the villa was sold to Caroline of Brunswick in 1814, who renamed it the Villa d'Este. Pino remained in retirement until his death.
