= List of Austrian films before 1920 =

A list of the earliest films produced in the Cinema of Austria between 1907 and 1919 ordered by year of release. In view of more than 300 films produced in these years the list is incomplete. For an alphabetical list of articles on Austrian films see Category:Austrian films.

== 1907–1914 ==
Title	Director	Cast	Genre	Studio/Notes
1907
Am Sklavenmarkt; At the Slave Market	Johann Schwarzer		Erotic film	Saturn-Film
Eine moderne Ehe; A Modern Marriage	Johann Schwarzer		Erotic film	Saturn-Film
1909
Die Kaisermanöver in Mähren; Royal Manoeuvres in Moravia		Kaiser Wilhelm; Kaiser Franz Joseph	Documentary	Photobrom GmbH
1910
Die Ahnfrau; The Ancestress	Anton Kolm		Drama	Erste österreichische Kinofilms-industrie; based on Grillparzer's play of the same name; remade in 1919
Die böse Schwiegermutter; The Angry Mother-in-Law	Anton Kolm			Erste österreichische Kinofilms-industrie
1911
Der Müller und sein Kind; The Miller and His Child	Walter Friedemann	Max Bing	Supernatural drama	Österreichisch-Ungarische Kinoindustrie; first Austrian drama film to survive in its entirety; based on the play of the same name by Ernst Raupach
Der Dorftrottel; The Village Idiot	Jacob Fleck; Luise Fleck			Wiener Kunstfilm
Die Glückspuppe; Lucky Doll				Wiener Kunstfilm
Hoffmanns Erzählungen; Tales of Hoffmann				Wiener Kunstfilm
Der Müller und sein Kind II; Miller and Child II	Walter Friedemann			Wiener Kunstfilm
Mutter - Tragödie eines Fabriksmädels; Mother – Tragedy of a Factory Girl				Wiener Kunstfilm
Nur ein armer Knecht; Just a Poor Servant				Wiener Kunstfilm
Typen und Szenen aus dem Wiener Volksleben; Ordinary Life in Vienna	Anton Kolm		Documentary	Wiener Kunstfilm
1912
Das Gänsehäufel; Goose Hill Island			Documentary	Wiener Kunstfilm
Die Gewinnung des Erzes am steirischen Erzberg in Eisenerz; Metal Ore Extraction on the Styrian Erzberg			Documentary	Sascha-Film
Kaiser Joseph II			Documentary	
Karl Blasel als Zahnarzt; Karl Blasel as Dentist				Wiener Kunstfilm
Die Musikantenlene	Felix Dörmann			Vindobona Film
Die tolle Teresina; Wonderful Teresina	Felix Dörmann			Vindobona Film
Trilby				Wiener Kunstfilm
Der Unbekannte; The Unknown	Luise Fleck	Eugenie Bernay		Wiener Kunstfilm
Die Zirkusgräfin; The Circus Countess	Felix Dörmann			Vindobona Film
1913
Die Hochzeit von Valeni; Valeni's Wedding				
Der hungrige Ritter; The Hungry Knight				
Die Insel der Seligen; Isle of the Blessed	Max Reinhardt			
Johann Strauß an der schönen blauen Donau; Johann Strauss on the Beautiful Blue Danube				
König Menelaus im Kino; King Menelaus at the Movies				
Der Millionenonkel; The Millionaire Uncle	Sascha Kolowrat-Krakowsky			Sascha-Film
Die Speckbacher; The Speckbachers				
Wiener Typen; Viennese Blokes				
Das Zauberlied; The Magic Song				
1914
Frau Gertrud Namenlos; Mrs Gertrud No-name	Jacob Fleck			Wiener Kunstfilm
Ein Tag im Leben einer schönen Frau; Day in the Life of a Beautiful Woman	Felix Dörmann			
Der Pfarrer von Kirchfeld; The Pastor of Kirchfeld	Jacob Fleck			Wiener Kunstfilm; Anzengruber's anticlerical play of 1870; remade in 1937
Svengali	Jacob Fleck			Wiener Kunstfilm
Das vierte Gebot; The Fourth Commandment				Wiener Kunstfilm

== 1915 ==
Title	Director	Cast	Genre	Notes
Charley, der Wunderaffe; Charley, the Amazing Monkey	Joe May	Heinrich Eisenbach; Hans Rhoden; Mia May		
Mit Herz und Hand fürs Vaterland; Heart and Hand for Fatherland	Luise Fleck; Jakob Fleck	Liane Haid; Max Neufeld	Propaganda	Wiener Kunstfilm;
Das Kriegspatenkind; The Godchild of War			Propaganda	
Der Meineidbauer; The Perjured Peasant	Jacob Fleck			Wiener Kunstfilm
The Tragedy of Castle Rottersheim	Jacob Fleck, Luise Fleck	Hermann Benke, Liane Haid	Drama	
Der Traum eines österreichischen Reservisten; Dream of an Austrian Reservist	Jacob Fleck, Luise Fleck		Propaganda	Wiener Kunstfilm

== 1916 ==
Title	Director	Cast	Genre	Notes
Siegreich durch Serbien; Victorious through Serbia			Propaganda	
Mit Gott für Kaiser und Reich; With God for Emperor and Empire	Jacob Fleck, Luise Fleck	Hermann Benke, Liane Haid	Propaganda	
On the Heights	Jacob Fleck, Luise Fleck	Hermann Benke, Liane Haid	Drama	

== 1917 ==
Title	Director	Cast	Genre	Notes
Im Banne der Pflicht; Bewitched by Duty	Jacob Fleck; Luise Fleck		Drama	Wiener Kunstfilm
Der Schandfleck; The Stain of Shame	Jacob Fleck; Luise Fleck		Drama	Wiener Kunstfilm
Mir kommt keiner aus No-one Gets on With Me				
Die Schlange der Leidenschaft; The Serpent of Passion	Jacob Fleck; Luise Fleck	Wilhelm Klitsch; Thea Rosenquist; Karl Ehmann		Wiener Kunstfilm
The Spendthrift	Jacob Fleck, Luise Fleck	Liane Haid, Wilhelm Klitsch	Historical	

== 1918 ==
Title	Director	Cast	Genre	Notes
Der Mandarin; The Mandarin	Fritz Freisler	Harry Walden; Karl Götz		
Double Suicide	Jacob Fleck, Luise Fleck	Karl Ehmann, Liane Haid	Drama	Wiener Kunstfilm
Die Geißel der Menschheit; Scourge of Mankind	Jacob Fleck; Luise Fleck	Hedda Bock; Gretl Russ		Wiener Kunstfilm
Das Kind meines Nächsten; My Neighbour's Child	Einar Zangenberg	Gisela Werbezirk; Dora Kaiser; Franz Glawatsch	Propaganda	A-Zet-Film
Die Macht des Anderen; The Power of the Other	Erwin Baron			Leyka-Film
Martyr of His Heart	Emil Justiz	Fritz Kortner, Anton Pointner	Historical	Sascha-Messter-Film; biography of Beethoven
The Other I	Fritz Freisler	Magda Sonja; Raoul Aslan; Fritz Kortner	Fantasy	Sascha-Film
Rigoletto	Jacob Fleck, Luise Fleck	Wilhelm Klitsch, Hermann Benke, Liane Haid	Historical	Wiener Kunstfilm

== 1919 ==
Title	Director	Cast	Genre	Notes
Die Ahnfrau; The Ancestress	Jacob Fleck; Luise Fleck	Liane Haid; Max Neufeld		Wiener Kunstfilm, remake of 1910 film; based on play by Grillparzer
Inferno	Paul Czinner	Franz Herterich; Grete Lundt		based on Dante's Inferno
Die Jüdin von Toledo; The Jewess of Toledo	Jacob Fleck; Luise Fleck			Wiener Kunstfilm; based on Grillparzer's play
Der ledige Hof; The Single Yard	Max Neufeld			
Lilith und Ly; Lilith and Ly	Erich Kober	Elga Beck; Ernst Escherich; Franz Kammauf	Horror	Fiat Films
Schwarze Augen; Black Eyes	Ludwig Loibner			Mitropa-Musikfilm
Der Sprung in die Ehe; Leap into Marriage		Ernst Arnold		
