= Doctor Schäfer =

1928 film

- Directed by: Jacob Fleck; Luise Fleck
- Written by: Jane Bess
- Produced by: Liddy Hegewald
- Cinematography: Georg Muschner
- Music by: Willy Schmidt-Gentner
- Production company: Hegewald Film
- Distributed by: Hegewald Film
- Release date: 24 April 1928
- Running time: 99 minutes
- Country: Germany
- Languages: Silent; German intertitles

Doctor Schäfer (German: Frauenarzt Dr. Schäfer) is a 1928 German silent film directed by Jacob Fleck and Luise Fleck.

The film's sets were designed by the art director Max Heilbronner.

== Cast ==
- Leopold Kramer as Professor Hausen
- Evelyn Holt as Evelyne Hausen, seine Tochter
- Iván Petrovich as Dr. Schäfer, Frauenarzt
- Agnes Petersen-Mozzuchinowa as Lucie Walker, Freundin Evelynens
- Hans Albers as Dr. Greber
- Imre Ráday as Charleston, Professor Hausens Neffe

== Bibliography ==
- Hans-Michael Bock and Tim Bergfelder. The Concise Cinegraph: An Encyclopedia of German Cinema. Berghahn Books.
