= The Voice of Conscience (1920 film) =

1920 film

- Directed by: Jacob Fleck; Luise Fleck
- Written by: Raoul Roland Benda
- Produced by: Anton Kolm; Luise Fleck; Jakob Fleck
- Starring: Liane Haid; Max Neufeld; Wilhelm Klitsch
- Production company: Wiener Kunstfilm
- Release date: 3 September 1920
- Country: Austria
- Languages: Silent; German intertitles

The Voice of Conscience (German: Die Stimme des Gewissens) is a 1920 Austrian silent film directed by Jacob Fleck and Luise Fleck and starring Liane Haid, Max Neufeld and Wilhelm Klitsch.

== Cast ==
- Liane Haid
- Max Neufeld
- Wilhelm Klitsch
- Karl Ehmann
- Josefine Josephi

== Bibliography ==
- Parish, Robert. Film Actors Guide. Scarecrow Press, 1977.
