= Bruno Granichstaedten =

Austrian composer and librettist (1879–1944)

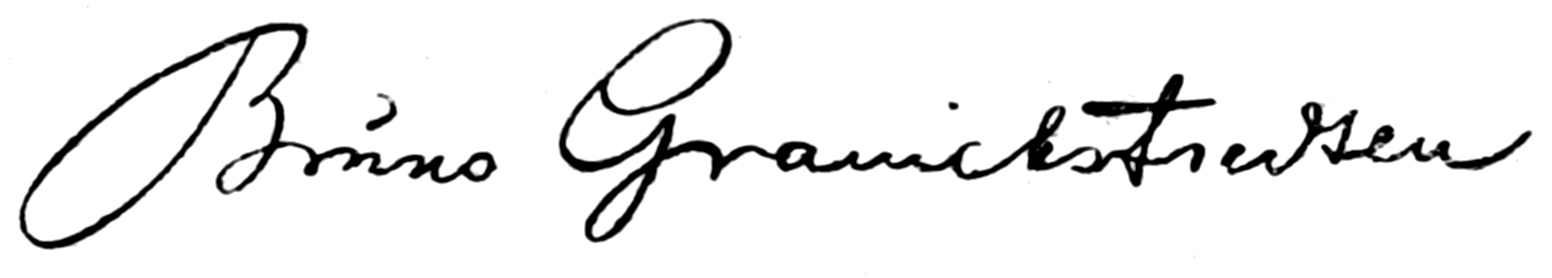
Bruno Granichstaedten signature

Bruno Bernhard Granichstaedten (September 1, 1879, Vienna – May 30, 1944, New York City) was an Austrian composer and librettist. He composed sixteen operettas and music for various films. He contributed the song "Zuschau'n kann i net" to the musical play The White Horse Inn. He emigrated from Austria, ending up in the United States of America in 1940, where he was only able to earn his living by playing the piano at night clubs.

== Works ==
- Bub oder Mädel? (Felix Dörmann and Adolf Altmann), operetta, prologue and 2 acts (13 November 1908 Vienna, Johann Strauss Theater)
- Wein, Weib and Gesang (Adolf Altmann), operetta 1 act (1909 Vienna)
- Lolotte (Bruno Granichstaedten and Alfred Schick-Markenau), operetta 3 acts (1910 Vienna)
- Majestät Mimi (Felix Dörmann and Roda Roda), operetta (1911 Vienna)
- Casimirs Himmelfahrt (Arthur Maria Willner and Robert Bodanzky), burlesque operetta (1911 Vienna)
- Die verbotene Stadt (Bruno Granichstaedten and Karl Lindau, operetta (1913 Berlin)
- Der Kriegsberichterstatter (Rudolf Österreicher and Wilhelm Sterk), bunte Bilder vom Tage (1914 Vienna) (Music: Eysler, Granichstaedten, Nedbal, Weinberger and Ziehrer)
- Auf Befehl der Herzogin (der Kaiserin) (Leopold Jacobson and Robert Bodanzky), operetta 3 acts (20 March 1915 Vienna, Theater an der Vienna)
- Walzerliebe (Bruno Granichstaedten and Robert Bodanzky), operetta, prologue and 2 acts (16 February 1918 Vienna, Apollo Theater)
- Das alte Lied (Bruno Granichstaedten), operetta 3 acts (1918 Vienna)
- Indische Nächte (Robert Bodanzky and Bruno Hardt-Warden), operetta 3 acts (1921 Vienna)
- Die Bacchusnacht (Bruno Granichstaedten and Ernst Marischka), operetta 3 acts (1923 Vienna)
- Glück bei Frauen (Viktor Léon and Heinz Reichert), operetta (1923 Vienna)
- Der Orlow (Bruno Granichstaedten and Ernst Marischka), operetta (3 April 1925 Vienna, Theater an der Wien)
- Das Schwalbennest (Bruno Granichstaedten and Ernst Marischka), Old-Vienna-Singspiel 3 acts (1926 Vienna)
- Evelyne (Bruno Granichstaedten and Peter Herz, after E. Phillips Oppenheim), operetta 3 acts (1927 Berlin)
- Der Dollar rollt! (Reklame!) (Bruno Granichstaedten and Ernst Marischka), operetta (1930 Vienna)

== Selected filmography ==
- The Orlov, directed by Luise Fleck and Jacob Fleck (Germany, 1927, based on the operetta Der Orlow)
- The Tsar's Diamond, directed by Max Neufeld (Germany, 1932, based on the operetta Der Orlow)
- The Queen's Affair, directed by Herbert Wilcox (UK, 1934, based on the operetta Die Königin)

=== Screenwriter and Composer ===
- The Forester's Daughter (Germany, 1931, dir: Frederic Zelnik)
- Walzerparadies (Germany, 1931, dir: Frederic Zelnik)
- Companion Wanted (French-language version, 1932, dir: Joe May)
  - Two in a Car (German-language version, 1932, dir: Joe May)
- The Company's in Love (Germany, 1932, dir. Max Ophüls)

=== Composer ===
- The Magic Top Hat (Germany, 1932, dir. Rudolf Bernauer)
