= Don Cesar, Count of Irun =

- Directed by: Jacob Fleck; Luise Fleck
- Written by: Philippe Dumanoir (play); Adolphe d'Ennery (play); Jacob Fleck; Luise Fleck
- Produced by: Anton Kolm
- Starring: Max Neufeld; Grit Haid; Karl Ehmann
- Production company: Wiener Kunstfilm
- Release date: 11 October 1918
- Country: Austro-Hungarian Empire
- Languages: Silent; German intertitles

Don Cesar, Count of Irun (German: Don Cäsar, Graf von Irun) is a 1918 Austrian silent historical film directed by Jacob Fleck and Luise Fleck and starring Max Neufeld, Grit Haid and Karl Ehmann. It is based on the opera Don César de Bazan by Philippe Dumanoir and Adolphe d'Ennery, based on Ruy Blas, an earlier work by Victor Hugo. It was made and released during the closing stages of the First World War.

== Cast ==
- Max Neufeld as Don Cäsar
- Grit Haid
- Karl Ehmann as König
- Rosa Günther as Queen
- Egon Brecher as Don Jose
- Eduard Sekler as Lazarillo

== Bibliography ==
- Robert Von Dassanowsky. Austrian Cinema: A History. McFarland, 2005.
