= The Vagabonds (1916 film) =

- Directed by: Jacob Fleck; Luise Fleck
- Written by: Leopold Krenn (play); Karl Lindau (play)
- Produced by: Anton Kolm
- Starring: Josef König; Liane Haid
- Music by: Karl Michael Ziehrer
- Production company: Wiener Kunstfilm
- Release date: 29 November 1916
- Country: Austro-Hungarian Empire
- Languages: Silent; German intertitles

The Vagabonds (German: Die Landstreicher) is a 1916 Austrian silent comedy film directed by Jacob Fleck and Luise Fleck and starring Josef König, Liane Haid and Marietta Weber. The film's score was based on the operetta of the same name composed by Karl Michael Ziehrer.

== Cast ==
- Josef König as Fliederbusch
- Liane Haid as Frau Fliederbusch
- Marietta Weber as Tänzerin Mimi
- Emil Guttmann as Fürst Adolar
- Hans Rhoden

== See also ==
- The Vagabonds (1937)

== Bibliography ==
- Robert Von Dassanowsky. Austrian Cinema: A History. McFarland, 2005.
