= The Master of Life =

1920 film

- Directed by: Jacob Fleck; Luise Fleck
- Written by: Raoul Roland Benda
- Produced by: Anton Kolm; Luise Fleck; Jakob Fleck
- Starring: Liane Haid; Max Neufeld; Karl Ehmann
- Production company: Wiener Kunstfilm
- Release date: 16 January 1920
- Country: Austria
- Languages: Silent; German intertitles

The Master of Life (German: Der Herr des Lebens) is a 1920 Austrian silent drama film directed by Jacob Fleck and Luise Fleck and starring Karl Ehmann, Liane Haid and Max Neufeld.

== Cast ==
- Karl Ehmann as Assistant Dr. Forster
- Liane Haid
- Max Neufeld
- Wilhelm Klitsch

== Bibliography ==
- Janelle Blankenship & Tobias Nag. European Visions: Small Cinemas in Transition. Transcript, 2015.
