= In the Line of Duty =

In the Line of Duty may refer to:

== Film and television ==
- In the Line of Duty (1915 film), an American film with William Stowell
- In the Line of Duty (1917 film), an Austrian silent film
- In the Line of Duty (film series), a series of Hong Kong action films
- "In the Line of Duty" (Stargate SG-1), a 1998 episode of Stargate SG-1
- "In the Line of Duty", a 2015 episode of NCIS: Los Angeles

== See also ==
- Line of Duty (2011–2021), a British police procedural television series
- Line of Duty (film), a 2019 Netflix film
- In Line of Duty, a 1931 American western film
