= Hermann Benke =

Austrian actor

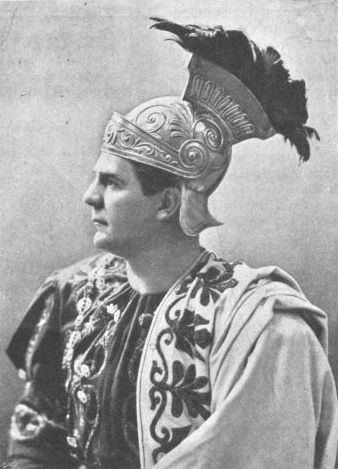
- Benke in 1903
- Born: 7 June 1866; Linz, Austrian Empire
- Died: 25 March 1937 (aged 70); Vienna, Austria
- Occupation: Actor
- Years active: 1914-1928 (film)

Hermann Benke (1866–1937) was an Austrian stage and film actor. He made a number of appearances in silent films, co-starring with the rising actress Liane Haid in productions by Wiener Kunstfilm.

== Selected filmography ==
- With Heart and Hand for the Fatherland (1915)
- With God for Emperor and Empire (1916)
- On the Heights (1916)
- Summer Idyll (1916)
- The Tragedy of Castle Rottersheim (1916)
- Lebenswogen (1917)
- The Black Hand (1917)
- Rigoletto (1918)
- The Films of Princess Fantoche (1921)
- The Woman in White (1921)
- The Arsonists of Europe (1926)
- Kissing Is No Sin (1926)
- The Woman of Yesterday and Tomorrow (1928)

== Bibliography ==
- Grange, William. Cultural Chronicle of the Weimar Republic. Scarecrow Press, 2008.
