= The Dancing Death =

1920 film

- Directed by: Jacob Fleck; Luise Fleck
- Written by: Max Neufeld
- Produced by: Anton Kolm; Luise Fleck; Jakob Fleck
- Starring: Karl Ehmann; Liane Haid; Max Neufeld
- Production company: Wiener Kunstfilm
- Release date: 9 April 1920
- Country: Austria
- Languages: Silent; German intertitles

The Dancing Death (German: Der tanzende Tod) is a 1920 Austrian silent film directed by Jacob Fleck and Luise Fleck and starring Karl Ehmann, Liane Haid and Max Neufeld.

== Cast ==
- Karl Ehmann as Graf Kürbach
- Liane Haid
- Max Neufeld
- Alice Hetsey
- Hans Rhoden

== Bibliography ==
- Parish, Robert. Film Actors Guide. Scarecrow Press, 1977.
