= Eva, The Sin =

1920 film

- Directed by: Jacob Fleck; Luise Fleck
- Written by: Luise Fleck; Jakob Fleck; Fritz Löhner-Beda
- Produced by: Anton Kolm; Luise Fleck; Jakob Fleck
- Starring: Liane Haid; Max Neufeld; Karl Ehmann
- Production company: Wiener Kunstfilm
- Release date: 12 November 1920
- Country: Austria
- Languages: Silent; German intertitles

Eva, The Sin (German: Eva, die Sünde) is a 1920 Austrian silent drama film directed by Jacob Fleck and Luise Fleck and starring Liane Haid, Max Neufeld and Karl Ehmann.

== Cast ==
- Liane Haid as Eva
- Max Neufeld as Baltramus
- Karl Ehmann as Abt von St. Bernhard
- Mario Bergugliano as Marquis d'Etoile
- Josef Recht as Bruder Hilarius

== Bibliography ==
- Robert Von Dassanowsky. Austrian Cinema: A History. McFarland, 2005.
