= Let the Little Ones Come to Me =

1920 film directed by Max Neufeld

- Directed by: Max Neufeld
- Written by: Fritz Löhner-Beda
- Produced by: Jacob Fleck; Luise Fleck; Anton Kolm
- Starring: Liane Haid; Max Neufeld; Karl Ehmann
- Production company: Wiener Kunstfilm
- Release date: 13 February 1920
- Country: Austria
- Languages: Silent; German intertitles

Let the Little Ones Come to Me (German: Lasset die Kleinen zu mir kommen) is a 1920 Austrian silent film directed by Max Neufeld and starring Neufeld, Liane Haid and Karl Ehmann.

== Cast ==
- Max Neufeld as Johann Schindler, Pfarrer
- Josephine Josephi as seine Mutter
- Liane Haid as Marei
- Lisl Günther as Toni Hellmer
- Karl Ehmann as Veidt
- Josef Bergauer
- Max Brebeck
- Polly Einhart
- Marietta Feldmann
- Thea Goll
- Josef Recht

== Bibliography ==
- Parish, Robert. Film Actors Guide. Scarecrow Press, 1977.
