= The Tsar's Diamond =

1932 film directed by Max Neufeld

- Directed by: Max Neufeld
- Written by: Bruno Granichstaedten; Ernst Marischka
- Produced by: Harry R. Sokal
- Starring: Liane Haid; Iván Petrovich; Viktor de Kowa
- Cinematography: Otto Kanturek; Bruno Timm
- Edited by: Paul May
- Music by: Bruno Granichstaedten
- Production company: Sokal Film
- Distributed by: Tobis Film
- Release date: 29 November 1932
- Running time: 89 minutes
- Country: Germany
- Language: German

The Tsar's Diamond (German: Der Diamant des Zaren or Der Orlow) is a 1932 German romantic comedy film directed by Max Neufeld and starring Liane Haid, Iván Petrovich and Viktor de Kowa. It was shot at the Babelsberg Studios in Berlin. The film's sets were designed by the art director Otto Hunte. It is an adaptation of the 1925 operetta The Orlov by Bruno Granichstaedten and Ernst Marischka, previously adapted into the 1927 film of the same title.

== Synopsis ==
In a German car factory a worker named Doroschinsky is in fact a former Russian Grand Duke who fled following the November Revolution and is now living under an alias. When he meets and falls in love with Nadja Nadjakowksa, a beautiful singer and like him a émigré, he decides to sell the one remaining thing of value he has left - the famous Orlov diamond from the former Tsar's sceptre. The sudden reappearance of the valuable treasure leads to the arrival of a confidence trickster who claims that he is the real Grand Duke and the diamond belongs to him.

== Cast ==
- Liane Haid as Nadja Nadjakowksa
- Iván Petrovich as Doroschinsky
- Max Gülstorff as Direktor Rosch
- Viktor de Kowa as Direktor Roller
- Kurt Lilien as 1. falscher Kriminalbeamter
- Kurt Fuß as 2. falscher Kriminalbeamter
- Eugen Neufeld as Kriminalrat
- Gregori Chmara as Falscher Großfürst
- Lydia Potechina as Falsche Großfürstin
- Alexa von Porembsky as Prinzessin Eudoxia
- Carla Gidt as Zofe
- Else Reval as Masseurin
- Theo Lingen as Köppke, Redakteur
- Leo Peukert as Kriminalkommissar
- Oscar Sabo as Betrunkener
- Heinrich Gretler as Monteur

== Bibliography ==
- Goble, Alan. The Complete Index to Literary Sources in Film. Walter de Gruyter, 1999.
- Klaus, Ulrich J. Deutsche Tonfilme: Jahrgang 1932. Klaus-Archiv, 1988.
