= Doctor Ruhland =

1920 film directed by Max Neufeld

- Directed by: Max Neufeld
- Produced by: Anton Kolm; Luise Fleck; Jakob Fleck
- Starring: Liane Haid; Max Neufeld
- Production company: Wiener Kunstfilm
- Release date: 12 July 1920
- Running time: 110 minutes
- Country: Austria
- Languages: Silent; German intertitles

Doctor Ruhland (German: Doktor Ruhland) is a 1920 Austrian silent film directed by Max Neufeld and starring Neufeld and Liane Haid.

== Cast ==
- Max Neufeld
- Liane Haid
- Hans Rhoden
- Marietta Weber

== Bibliography ==
- Parish, Robert. Film Actors Guide. Scarecrow Press, 1977.
