= Summer Idyll =

- Directed by: Jacob Fleck; Luise Fleck
- Written by: Hans Kottow
- Produced by: Anton Kolm
- Starring: Hermann Benke; Liane Haid; Max Neufeld
- Production company: Wiener Kunstfilm
- Release date: 3 March 1916
- Country: Austro-Hungarian Empire
- Languages: Silent; German intertitles

Summer Idyll (German: Sommeridylle) is a 1916 Austrian silent drama film directed by Jacob Fleck and Luise Fleck (then known as Luise Kolm) and starring Liane Haid, Hermann Benke and Max Neufeld.

== Cast ==
- Margarete Thumann
- Liane Haid
- Hermann Benke
- Hans Rhoden
- Karl Baumgartner
- Otto Kreisler
- Max Neufeld
- Hermann Romberg

== Bibliography ==
- Parish, Robert. Film Actors Guide. Scarecrow Press, 1977.
