= Lebenswogen =

1917 film

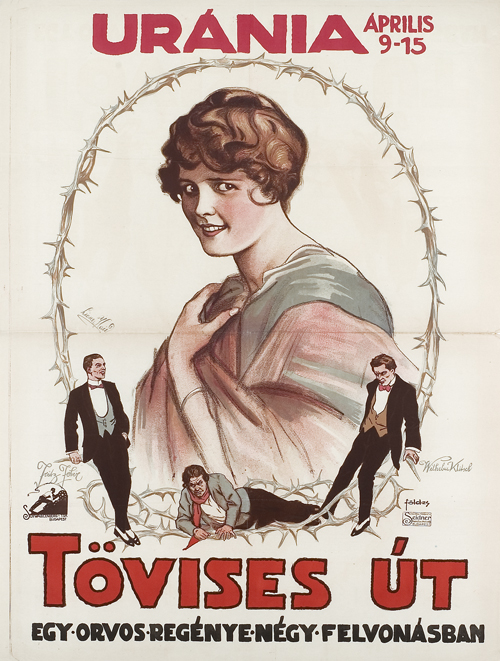
- Directed by: Jacob Fleck; Luise Fleck
- Written by: Jacob Fleck; Luise Fleck; Hans Kottow
- Produced by: Anton Kolm
- Starring: Wilhelm Klitsch; Liane Haid; Hermann Benke
- Production company: Wiener Kunstfilm
- Release date: 5 January 1917
- Country: Austro-Hungarian Empire
- Languages: Silent; German intertitles

Lebenswogen is a 1917 Austro-Hungarian silent film directed by Jacob Fleck and Luise Fleck and starring Wilhelm Klitsch, Liane Haid and Hermann Benke. The term "lebenswogen" translates to "life waves".

== Cast ==
- Wilhelm Klitsch as Dr. Erwin Lenk
- Liane Haid as Bergers Tochter
- Hermann Benke as Kommerzialrat Berger
- Moritz Millmann as Prof. Dr. Wanderberg
- Friedrich Feher
- Else Kündinger
- Eduard Sekler

== Production ==
Lebenswogen was filmed in Vienna in 1916, and was subsequently banned for youth in Germany. The movie premiered in Vienna on January 5, 1917.

== Bibliography ==
- Parish, Robert. Film Actors Guide. Scarecrow Press, 1977.
