= Gretl Theimer =

Austrian actress

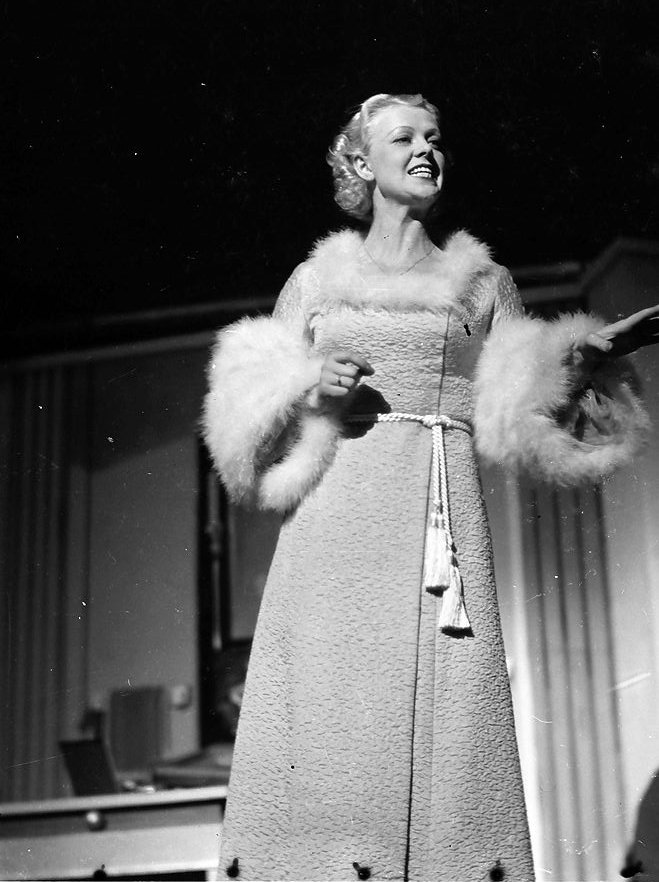
- Gretl Theimer in the Kabarett der Komiker
- Born: 27 November 1910; Vienna, Austria-Hungary
- Died: 14 May 1972 (aged 61); Munich, West Germany

Gretl Theimer (27 November 1910 – 14 May 1972) was an Austrian actress.

Theimer was born in Vienna, Austria and died in Munich, West Germany at age 61.

== Selected filmography ==
- Two Hearts in Waltz Time (1930)
- Oh Those Glorious Old Student Days (1930)
- Three Days Confined to Barracks (1930)
- His Highness Love (1931)
- Schubert's Dream of Spring (1931)
- When the Soldiers (1931)
- Her Majesty the Barmaid (1931)
- Everyone Asks for Erika (1931)
- Victoria and Her Hussar (1931)
- Holzapfel Knows Everything (1932)
- His Majesty's Adjutant (1932)
- The Four from Bob 13 (1932)
- The Champion Shot (1932)
- Viennese Waltz (1932)
- The Secret of Johann Orth (1932)
- The Happiness of Grinzing (1933)
- Our Emperor (1933)
- Roses from the South (1934)
- Just Once a Great Lady (1934)
- The Fight with the Dragon (1935)
- Fräulein Veronika (1936)
- Such Great Foolishness (1937)
- The Vagabonds (1937)
- Dance on the Volcano (1938)
- Immortal Waltz (1939)
- Falstaff in Vienna (1940)
- The Prince of Pappenheim (1952)
- The Trapp Family (1956)
- The Beautiful Master (1956)
- Marriages Forbidden (1957)
- Voyage to Italy, Complete with Love (1958)
