= The Right to Love (1930 German film) =

1930 film

- Directed by: Jacob Fleck; Luise Fleck
- Written by: Magnus Hirschfeld; Hans Rosen
- Produced by: Liddy Hegewald
- Starring: Georg Alexander; Evelyn Holt; Georgia Lind; Hermine Sterler
- Cinematography: Nicolas Farkas
- Production company: Hegewald Film
- Distributed by: Hegewald Film
- Release date: 17 January 1930
- Country: Germany
- Languages: Silent; German intertitles

The Right to Love (German: Das Recht auf Liebe) is a 1930 German silent drama film directed by Jacob Fleck and Luise Fleck and starring Georg Alexander, Evelyn Holt, and Georgia Lind. The film addresses the issue of the rights of ex-soldiers made impotent by war wounds to get married. It is in the Weimar tradition of films addressing topics of sexual education.

== Cast ==
In alphabetical order

- Georg Alexander as Georg Hess
- Evelyn Holt as Evelyn Gebhard, Frau Gebhards Tochter
- Georgia Lind as Dolly Hess, Georgs Frau
- Hermine Sterler as Frau Gebhard, eine Offizierswitwe
- Henry Stuart as Erwin Voss, Grossindustrieller
- Igo Sym as Ingenieur von Berndorf

== Bibliography ==
- Prawer, Siegbert Salomon (2005). Between Two Worlds: The Jewish Presence in German and Austrian Film, 1910–1933. New York: Berghahn Books. ISBN 978-1-84545-074-8.
