= Die Glückspuppe =

- Directed by: Jakob and Luise Fleck
- Starring: Max Bing
- Distributed by: Österreichisch-ungarische Kino-Industrie
- Release date: 1911
- Country: Austria
- Language: Silent film

Die Glückspuppe is a 1911 Austrian silent short film directed by Jakob and Luise Fleck.

== Cast ==
- Mizzi Bittner as Mizzi, a Blumenverkäuferin ('flower-seller')
- Werzel as Elly, Mizzi's child
- Max Bing as Robert Sassen
- Ernst Lunzer
