= The Black Hand (1917 film) =

- Directed by: Jacob Fleck; Luise Fleck
- Written by: Jacob Fleck; Luise Fleck; Hans Hübner
- Produced by: Anton Kolm
- Starring: Liane Haid; Max Neufeld; Hermann Benke
- Production company: Wiener Kunstfilm
- Release date: 9 February 1917
- Country: Austro-Hungarian Empire
- Languages: Silent; German intertitles

The Black Hand (German: Die schwarze Hand or Mir kommt keiner aus) is a 1917 Austrian silent crime film directed by Liane Haid, Max Neufeld and Hermann Benke.

== Cast ==
- Ernst Tautenhayn as Amadeus Wipfl
- Mizzi Schütz as Wipfl's Frau
- Liane Haid as Wipfl's Tochter
- Walter Huber as Ottokar Steuer
- Karl Baumgartner as Jean
- Christl Giampietro as Minna
- Max Neufeld as Fritz Waldau
- Nelly Hochwald as Nelly, Tänzerin
- Marietta Weber
- Hermann Benke
- Hans Marr
- Hubert Marischka

== Bibliography ==
- Parish, Robert. Film Actors Guide. Scarecrow Press, 1977.
