= The Slipper Hero =

1923 film

- German: Der Pantoffelheld
- Directed by: Reinhold Schünzel
- Written by: Robert Liebmann
- Produced by: Victor Micheluzzi; Reinhold Schünzel
- Starring: Scott van Balen; Liane Haid; Paul Hartmann
- Cinematography: Curt Courant
- Production company: Micco Film
- Release date: September 1923
- Countries: Austria; Germany
- Languages: Silent; German intertitles

The Slipper Hero (German: Der Pantoffelheld) is a 1923 Austrian-German silent comedy film directed by Reinhold Schünzel and starring Scott van Balen, Liane Haid and Paul Hartmann. The title is an expression for a hen-pecked husband.

The film's sets were designed by the art director Oscar Friedrich Werndorff.

== Cast ==
- Liane Haid
- Reinhold Schünzel
- Paul Hartmann
- Else Fischer
- Liesl Stillmark
