= The Tragedy of Castle Rottersheim =

- Directed by: Jacob Fleck; Luise Fleck
- Written by: Leopold Krenn; Paul Lindau
- Produced by: Anton Kolm
- Starring: Hermann Benke; Liane Haid; Cordy Millowitsch
- Production company: Wiener Kunstfilm
- Release date: 10 December 1916
- Running time: 83 minutes
- Country: Austro-Hungarian Empire
- Languages: Silent; German intertitles

The Tragedy of Castle Rottersheim (German: Die Tragödie auf Schloss Rottersheim) is a 1916 Austrian silent drama film directed by Jacob Fleck and Luise Fleck and starring Hermann Benke, Liane Haid and Cordy Millowitsch.

Location shooting took place around Laxenburg.

== Cast ==
- Hermann Benke as Graf Alwin Rottersheim
- Liane Haid as Lieserl
- Cordy Millowitsch as Gräfin Rottersheim
- Karl Baumgartner as Pfarrer
- Rudolf Beer as Schorsch Stelzer, Musikant
- Stina Christophersen
- Marietta Hofer as Annerl
- Walter Hofer as Ferdl
- Polly Janisch as Frau Mali Stelzer
- Grete Lundt as Baronin Elsa Hartwig
- Karl Pfann as Baron Erich Hartwig
- Otto Storm as Graf Alfons von Rhelen

== Bibliography ==
- Parish, Robert. Film Actors Guide. Scarecrow Press, 1977.
