= A Girl of the People =

1927 film

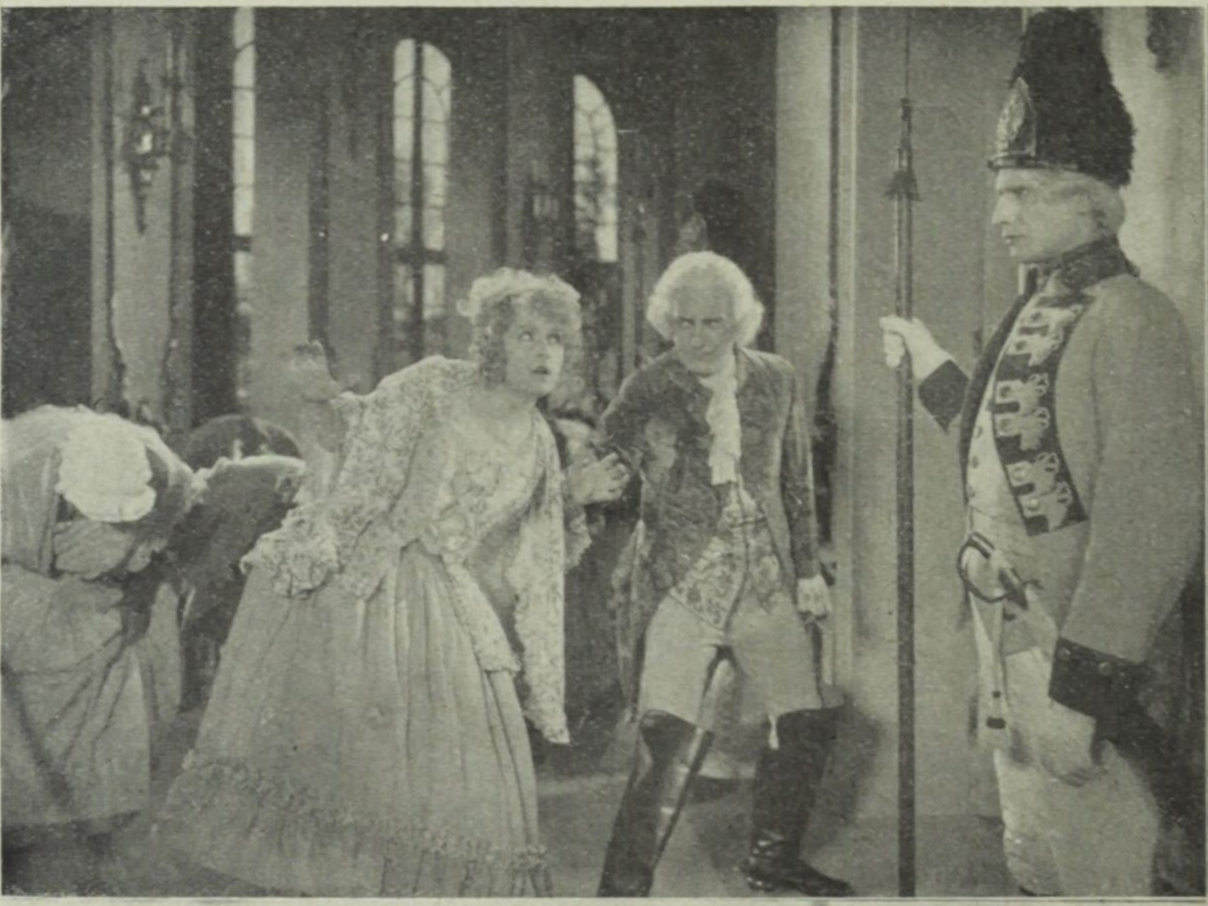
- Xenia Desni and Harry Liedtke
- Directed by: Jacob Fleck; Luise Fleck
- Written by: Walter Reisch (play)
- Produced by: Rudolf Dworsky
- Starring: Xenia Desni; Harry Liedtke; Livio Pavanelli
- Cinematography: Guido Seeber
- Music by: Felix Bartsch
- Production company: Aafa-Film
- Distributed by: Aafa-Film
- Release date: 13 October 1927
- Country: Germany
- Languages: Silent; German intertitles

A Girl of the People (German: Ein Mädel aus dem Volke) is a 1927 German silent historical drama film directed by Jacob and Luise Fleck and starring Xenia Desni, Harry Liedtke and Livio Pavanelli.

The film's sets were designed by the art director Botho Hoefer and August Rinaldi.

== Cast ==
- Xenia Desni as Stasia Schopfinger, Tochter
- Harry Liedtke as Kronprinz / Kaiser Josef II
- Livio Pavanelli as Schnurl Schramseis, des Kaisers Bereiter
- Hermann Picha as Schopfinger, Schuhmachermeister
- Margarete Lanner as Gräfin Szathiany
- Erich Kaiser-Titz as Fürst Kaunitz, Kanzler
- Eduard von Winterstein as Generalissimus Laudon
- Julia Serda as Kaiserin Maria Theresia
- Karl Elzer as Kurfürst Max von Bayern
- Carla Bartheel as Prinzessin Maria Josepha
- Adolphe Engers as Leibarzt Quarin
- Fritz Kampers as Der Geselle
- Hans Brausewetter as Schusterjunge

== Bibliography ==
- Bock, Hans-Michael & Bergfelder, Tim. The Concise CineGraph. Encyclopedia of German Cinema. Berghahn Books, 2009.
