= The Stain of Shame =

- Directed by: Jacob Fleck; Luise Fleck
- Written by: Ludwig Anzengruber (novel); Jacob Fleck; Luise Fleck
- Produced by: Anton Kolm
- Starring: Liane Haid; Karl Ehmann; Anton Tiller
- Production company: Wiener Kunstfilm
- Release date: 7 December 1917
- Country: Austro-Hungarian Empire
- Languages: Silent; German intertitles

The Stain of Shame (German: Der Schandfleck) is a 1917 Austrian silent drama film directed by Jacob Fleck and Luise Fleck and starring Liane Haid, Karl Ehmann and Anton Tiller.

The film is based on Ludwig Anzengruber's 1877 novel Der Schandfleck, which, like much of his work, deals with Austrian peasant life.

== Plot ==
Luise Reindorfer and Florian, the miller's son, who is almost the same age, have known each other since childhood. One day, after Florian has been away for a while to study, the two meet again at a shrine to the Virgin Mary. From the old bond between the two children grows a deep affection, and the two young people decide to stay together from then on. Luise tells her father, Josef, about her wedding plans, but the old man wants nothing to do with it, because the miller, Florian's father, has been his mortal enemy for ages. From then on, Josef forbids his daughter Leni any contact with Florian. Luise doesn't take her father's announcement entirely seriously, believing that the old man will eventually calm down and agree to the marriage. Only when even the intervention of Florian's mother with Josef Reindorfer proves fruitless does Luise's hope fade.

== Cast ==
- Liane Haid
- Karl Ehmann
- Anton Tiller
- Hans Rhoden
- Herr Selder
- Eduard Sekler
- Josephine Josephi
- Marianne Wulff
- Max Brebeck

== Bibliography ==
- Robert Von Dassanowsky. Austrian Cinema: A History. McFarland, 2005.
