= The Spendthrift (1917 film) =

- Directed by: Jacob Fleck; Luise Fleck
- Written by: Ferdinand Raimund (play)
- Starring: Marie Marchal; Wilhelm Klitsch; Hans Rhoden
- Music by: Gyula Geiger; Konradin Kreutzer; Oskar Visag
- Production company: Wiener Kunstfilm
- Release date: 2 November 1917
- Country: Austria
- Languages: Silent; German intertitles

The Spendthrift (German:Der Verschwender) is a 1917 Austrian silent historical film directed by Jacob Fleck and Luise Fleck and starring Marie Marchal, Wilhelm Klitsch and Hans Rhoden. It is an adaptation of Ferdinand Raimund's 1834 play of the same name.

== Cast ==
- Marie Marchal as Cheristane
- Wilhelm Klitsch as Flottwell
- Hans Rhoden as Valentin
- Liane Haid as Rosl
- Karl Ehmann
- Egon Brecher

== Bibliography ==
- Klossner, Michael. The Europe of 1500-1815 on Film and Television: A Worldwide Filmography of Over 2550 Works, 1895 Through 2000. McFarland, 2002.
