= His Majesty's Lieutenant =

1929 film

- Directed by: Jacob Fleck; Luise Fleck
- Written by: Ladislaus Vajda
- Produced by: Liddy Hegewald
- Starring: Iván Petrovich; Agnes Esterhazy; Georg Alexander; Lilian Ellis
- Cinematography: Eduard Hoesch
- Music by: Otto Stransky
- Production company: Hegewald Film
- Distributed by: Hegewald Film
- Release date: 12 April 1929
- Country: Germany
- Languages: Silent; German intertitles

His Majesty's Lieutenant (German: Der Leutnant Ihrer Majestät) is a 1929 German silent romance film directed by Jacob Fleck and Luise Fleck and starring Iván Petrovich, Agnes Esterhazy and Georg Alexander. It was shot at the Staaken Studios in Berlin.

== Cast ==
- Iván Petrovich as Graf Georg Michailowitsch
- Agnes Esterhazy as Kaiserin
- Georg Alexander as Kammerherr Graf Alexandroff
- Lilian Ellis as 3. Hofdame, Komtesse Olga von Bursanow
- Ferdinand Hart as Kaiser
- Mary Kid as 2. Hofdame, Gräfin Xenia Baranowskaja
- Alexander Murski as Oberhofmeister Graf von Bursanow
- Lya Christy as 1. Hofdame, Fürstin Louboff Wolgoff

== Bibliography ==
- Prawer, S.S. Between Two Worlds: The Jewish Presence in German and Austrian Film, 1910–1933. Berghahn Books, 2005.
