= With Heart and Hand for the Fatherland =

1915 film by Jacob Fleck and Luise Fleck

- Directed by: Jacob Fleck; Luise Fleck
- Written by: Jacob Fleck; Luise Fleck
- Produced by: Anton Kolm
- Starring: Hubert Marischka; Hermann Benke; Liane Haid
- Music by: Franz Lehár
- Production company: Wiener Kunstfilm
- Release date: 31 December 1915
- Running time: 82 minutes
- Country: Austro-Hungarian Empire
- Languages: Silent; German intertitles

With Heart and Hand for the Fatherland (German: Mit Herz und Hand fürs Vaterland) is a 1915 Austrian silent war drama film directed by Jacob Fleck and Luise Fleck and starring Hubert Marischka, Hermann Benke and Liane Haid. The composer Franz Lehár, better known for his operetta, created a score to accompany the film during screenings.

A patriotic story designed to support Austria's war effort during the First World War, it marked the screen debut of actress Liane Haid who went on be a leading screen star.

== Plot ==
A reserve officer in the Tyrolean Rifles leaves his family go and fight on the Italian Front.

== Cast ==
- Hubert Marischka
- Margarete Thumann
- Liane Haid
- Hermann Benke
- Karl Baumgartner
- Franz Felix
- Viktoria Pohl-Meiser
- Polly Janisch
- Louis Seeman
- Max Neufeld
- Hermann Romberg

== Bibliography ==
- Robert Von Dassanowsky. Austrian Cinema: A History. McFarland, 2005.
