= On the Heights =

- Directed by: Jacob Fleck; Luise Fleck
- Written by: Ludwig Ganghofer (play); Jacob Fleck; Luise Fleck
- Produced by: Anton Kolm
- Starring: Hermann Benke; Liane Haid
- Production company: Wiener Kunstfilm
- Release date: September 1916
- Running time: 85 minutes
- Country: Austro-Hungarian Empire
- Languages: Silent; German intertitles

On the Heights (German: Auf der Höhe) is a 1916 Austrian silent drama film directed by Jacob Fleck and Luise Fleck and starring Liane Haid, Hermann Benke and Wilhelm Klitsch. The film adapts a play of the same name by Ludwig Ganghofer. The film, that is presumed lost (as only two films of the directors from their production during the 1910s have survived), was also co-produced by Luise and Jacob Fleck.

== Plot ==
Gregor Stark is a poor man. In order to significantly improve his living conditions, he kidnaps Helene, a forester's daughter.

Gregor gets a position at the Böllmann manufacture and rises in the hierarchy of the company learned a secret about Böllmann that allows him to blackmail his employer. He forces the manufacturer to give him the hand of his daughter Paula. But the latter is not at all happy with that prospect, because she loves Stephan Günther, her childhood friend.

On the eve of the marriage, Stark wants to free himself from Helene, who has become attached to her kidnapper. During the fierce discussion as a result of the separation sought by Gregor, Helene falls from the balcony into the lake below and drowns. Gregor then falls into madness and smashes a mirror in front of all the guests at his own wedding party, in which he thinks he sees the dead Helene. He then falls down the stairs before he comes to the feet of his bride to lie down dead.

== Cast ==
- Wilhelm Klitsch as Gregor Stark
- Liane Haid as Paula
- Polly Janisch as Helene
- Hermann Benke as Fabrikant Böllmann
- Hubert Marischka
- Walter Huber
- Max Neufeld

== Release and reception ==
The film was theatrically released in Vienna on 29 September 1916. A brief assessment in Paimann’s Filmlisten wrote: "Material, acting, photos and especially the final scene: great!"

== Bibliography ==
- Parish, Robert. Film Actors Guide. Scarecrow Press, 1977.
