= The Woman in White (1921 film) =

1921 film directed by Max Neufeld

- Directed by: Max Neufeld
- Written by: Wilkie Collins (novel)
- Based on: The Woman in White; 1860 novel by Wilkie Collins
- Starring: Liane Haid; Dora Kaiser; Eugen Neufeld
- Production company: Vita-Film
- Release date: 28 January 1921
- Country: Austria
- Languages: Silent; German intertitles

The Woman in White (German: Die Frau in Weiß) is a 1921 Austrian silent drama film directed by Max Neufeld and starring Liane Haid, Dora Kaiser and Eugen Neufeld. It is based on the 1860 novel The Woman in White by Wilkie Collins.

== Cast ==
- Liane Haid
- Dora Kaiser
- Max Neufeld
- Eugen Neufeld
- Hermann Benke
- Ferdinand Onno
- Julius Strobl
- Eduard Sekler

== Bibliography ==
- Robert Von Dassanowsky. Austrian Cinema: A History. McFarland, 2005.
