= The Wedding of Valeni =

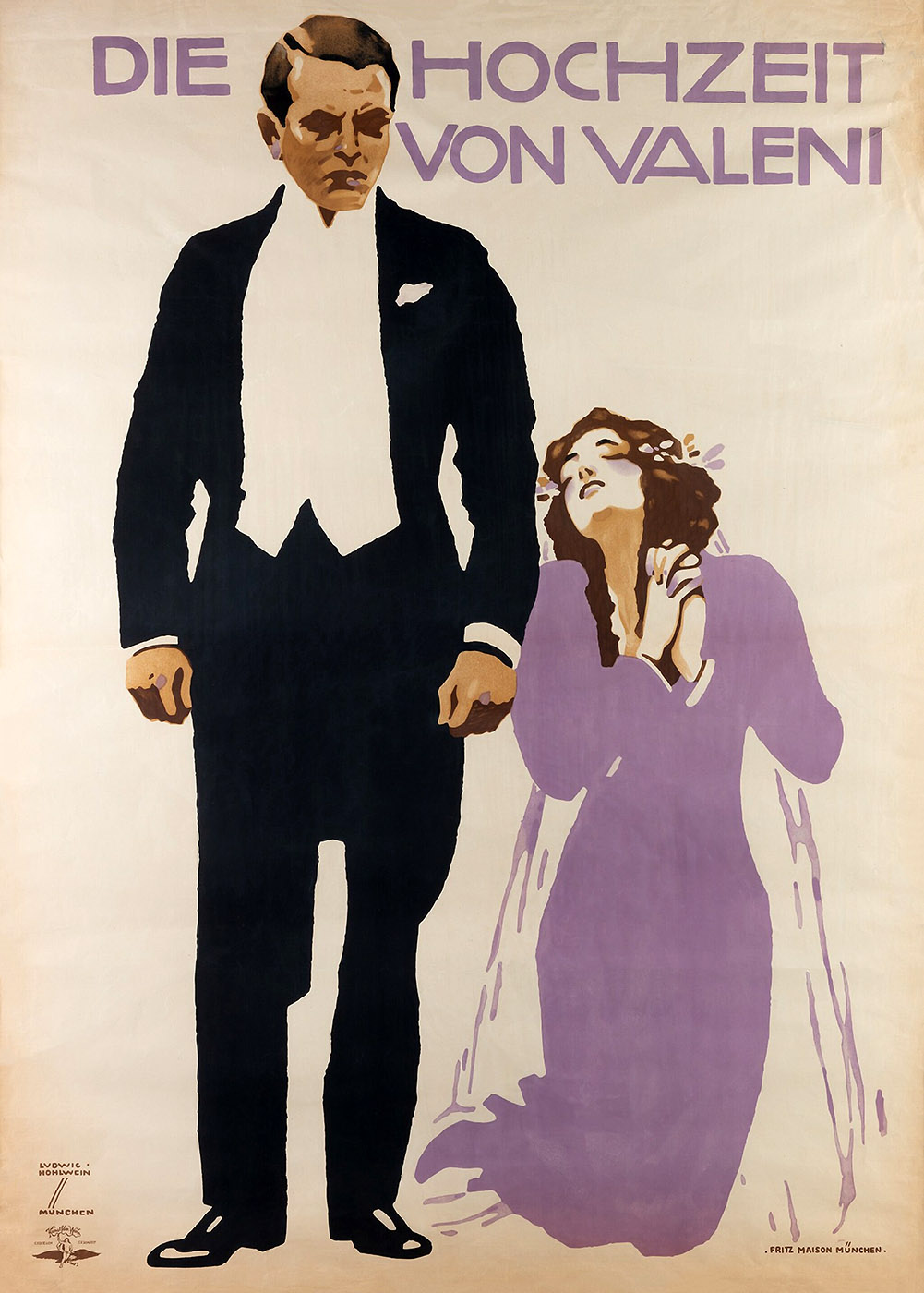
- German: Die Hochzeit von Valeni
- Directed by: Jacob Fleck
- Written by: Ludwig Ganghofer (play); Marco Brociner (play); Luise Fleck
- Produced by: Anton Kolm; Luise Fleck
- Starring: Max Neufeld
- Production company: Wiener Kunstfilm
- Release date: 30 January 1914
- Running time: 83 minutes
- Country: Austro-Hungarian Empire
- Languages: Silent; German intertitles

The Wedding of Valeni (German: Die Hochzeit von Valeni) is a 1914 Austrian drama film directed by Jacob Fleck. It was produced by Wiener Kunstfilm, the leading Austrian studio of the era. It is an adaptation of a play by Ludwig Ganghofer and Marco Brociner.

== Cast ==
- Carl Ludwig Friese as Baku
- Polly Janisch as Sandra
- Herr Normann as Tschuku
- Max Neufeld as Jonel

== See also ==
- Slaves of Love (1924)
