= Yacht of the Seven Sins =

1928 film

- French theatrical release poster
- Directed by: Jacob Fleck; Luise Fleck
- Written by: Paul Rosenhayn (novel); Hans Rameau
- Produced by: Günther Stapenhorst
- Starring: Brigitte Helm; John Stuart; Rina Marsa
- Cinematography: Carl Drews; Edgar S. Ziesemer
- Production company: UFA
- Distributed by: UFA
- Release date: 6 August 1928
- Country: Germany
- Languages: Silent; German intertitles

Yacht of the Seven Sins (German: Die Yacht der sieben Sünden) is a 1928 German silent drama film directed by Jacob Fleck and Luise Fleck and starring Brigitte Helm, John Stuart and Rina Marsa.

The film's art direction was by Jacek Rotmil.

== Synopsis ==
A number of millionaires and criminals gather aboard a luxury cruise liner for a round-the-world trip, but a shipping tycoon is murdered soon after departure.

== Cast ==
- Brigitte Helm as Marta Petrowna
- John Stuart as Kilian Gurlitt
- Rina Marsa as Léonie Storm, seine Braut
- Kurt Vespermann as Alfons Costa
- Hugo Werner-Kahle as Der Fremde
- Kurt Gerron as Der Mann mit der Narbe
- Alfred Gerasch as Stefan Martini
- Emil Rameau as Bürovorsteher
- Otto Kronburger as Kommissar
- Nico Turoff

== Bibliography ==
- Ganeva, Mila. Women in Weimar Fashion: Discourses and Displays in German Culture, 1918-1933. Camden House, 2008.
