= An Auto and No Money =

1932 film

- Directed by: Jacob Fleck; Luise Fleck
- Written by: Wilhelm Lichtenberg (novel); Alfred Schirokauer
- Starring: Paul Kemp; Dina Gralla; Igo Sym
- Cinematography: Eduard Hoesch
- Music by: Bernard Grun
- Production company: Sonor-Film
- Distributed by: Heros-Film
- Release date: 11 February 1932
- Running time: 95 minutes
- Country: Germany
- Language: German

An Auto and No Money (German: Ein Auto und kein Geld) is a 1932 German comedy film directed by Jacob Fleck and Luise Fleck, starring Paul Kemp, Dina Gralla and Igo Sym. It was shot at the Hunnia Studios in Budapest. The film's sets were designed by the art director Max Heilbronner.

== Cast ==
- Paul Kemp as Peter Knopf, Auslagendekorateur
- Dina Gralla as Mimi
- Igo Sym as Marchese della Serra
- Jakob Tiedtke as Kersten, Fabrikant
- Liselotte Schaak as Mary, seine Tochter
- Walter Bach as Bobby
- Hugo Döblin as S. Piper
- Oscar Beregi Sr.
- Gyula Kabos
- Gusztáv Vándory

== Bibliography ==
- Klaus, Ulrich J. Deutsche Tonfilme: Jahrgang 1932. Klaus-Archiv, 1988.
- Waldman, Harry. Nazi Films in America, 1933-1942. McFarland, 2008.
