= Flirtation (1927 film) =

1927 film

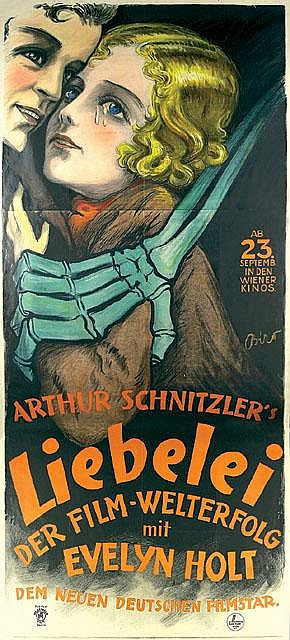
- Austrian poster
- Directed by: Jacob Fleck; Luise Fleck
- Written by: Arthur Schnitzler (play); Herbert Juttke; Georg C. Klaren
- Produced by: Liddy Hegewald
- Starring: Fred Louis Lerch; Henry Stuart; Jaro Fürth
- Cinematography: Eduard Hoesch
- Music by: Felix Bartsch
- Production company: Hegewald Film
- Distributed by: Hegewald Film
- Release date: 2 October 1927
- Country: Germany
- Languages: Silent; German intertitles

Flirtation (German: Liebelei) is a 1927 German silent drama film directed by Jacob Fleck and Luise Fleck and starring Fred Louis Lerch, Henry Stuart and Jaro Fürth. It was shot at the Johannisthal and EFA Studios in Berlin. The film's sets were designed by the art director Jacek Rotmil. It was based on a play by Arthur Schnitzler, which was turned into a 1933 sound film Liebelei by Max Ophüls.

== Cast ==
- Fred Louis Lerch as Fritz Lobheimer, Student
- Henry Stuart as Theodor Kaiser, sein Studienfreund
- Jaro Fürth as Der alte Weyring, Cellist am Stadttheater
- Evelyn Holt as Christine, seine Tochter
- Hilde Maroff as Mizzi Schlager, ihre Freundin
- Robert Scholz as Bankier Velten
- Vivian Gibson as Doris, seine Frau
- Karl Platen as Franz, Lobmeiers Diener

== Bibliography ==
- Alfred Krautz. International directory of cinematographers, set- and costume designers in film, Volume 4. Saur, 1984.
