= When the Soldiers =

1931 film

- Directed by: Jacob Fleck; Luise Fleck
- Written by: Karl Farkas (play); Ida Jenbach
- Produced by: Liddy Hegewald
- Starring: Otto Wallburg; Gretl Theimer; Ida Wüst
- Cinematography: Giovanni Vitrotti; Eduard Hoesch
- Music by: Will Meisel
- Production company: Hegewald Film
- Release date: 29 April 1931
- Running time: 87 minutes
- Country: Germany
- Language: German

When the Soldiers (German: Wenn die Soldaten) is a 1931 German comedy film directed by Jacob Fleck and Luise Fleck and starring Otto Wallburg, Gretl Theimer and Ida Wüst.

== Cast ==
- Otto Wallburg as General von Plessow
- Gretl Theimer as Tilly, seine Tochter
- Ida Wüst as Tante Anastasia, deren Tante
- Hermann Thimig as Bob Wilsdorf, Leutnant
- Paul Heidemann as Nicky, sein Bursche
- Ernö Verebes as Franzl - Militärmusikant
- John Mylong as Ein Rittmeister
- Oscar Marion as Ein Oberleutnant
- Charlotte Ander as Betty. Stubenmädchen
- Johanna Ewald as Die Pensionsinhaberin
- Eugen Rex as Vorsitzender des Festausschusses
- Lotte Stein
- Kurt Lilien
- Else Reval
- Olly Pfeiler

== Bibliography ==
- Alfred Krautz. International directory of cinematographers, set- and costume designers in film, Volume 4. Saur, 1984.
