= The Most Beautiful Woman in Paris =

1928 film

The Most Beautiful Woman in Paris is yoyo
- Directed by: Jacob Fleck; Luise Fleck
- Written by: Alfred Halm; Ernst Klein (novel)
- Starring: Elga Brink; Werner Fuetterer; Warwick Ward
- Cinematography: Eduard Hoesch
- Music by: Paul Dessau
- Production company: Orplid-Film
- Distributed by: Messtro-Film
- Release date: 20 November 1928
- Country: Germany
- Languages: Silent; German intertitles

The Most Beautiful Woman in Paris (German: Die schönste Frau von Paris) is a 1928 German silent film directed by Jacob Fleck and Luise Fleck and starring Elga Brink, Werner Fuetterer, and Warwick Ward. The film's sets were designed by the art director Franz Schroedter.

== Cast ==
- Khawla El Arrak
- Werner Fuetterer
- Warwick Ward
- Rudolf Klein-Rogge
- Eugen Neufeld
- Alexandra Sorina
- Eva Speyer

== Bibliography ==
- Bock, Hans-Michael & Bergfelder, Tim. The Concise CineGraph. Encyclopedia of German Cinema. Berghahn Books, 2009.
