= The Tsarevich (1929 film) =

1929 film

- German: Der Zarewitsch
- Directed by: Jacob Fleck; Luise Fleck
- Written by: Hans Rameau; Gabriela Zapolska (play)
- Produced by: Liddy Hegewald
- Starring: Iván Petrovich; Marietta Millner; Albert Steinrück
- Cinematography: Eduard Hoesch
- Music by: Franz Lehár
- Production company: Hegewald Film
- Distributed by: Hegewald Film
- Release date: 1929
- Country: Germany
- Languages: Silent; German intertitles

The Tsarevich (German: Der Zarewitsch) is a 1929 German silent historical film directed by Jacob Fleck and Luise Fleck and starring Iván Petrovich, Marietta Millner and Albert Steinrück. The film's sets were designed by Willi Herrmann.

Like the 1927 operetta Der Zarewitsch by Franz Lehár it is based on a play by Gabriela Zapolska, inspired by the troubled relationship between Peter the Great and his son Tsarevich Alexei.

== Cast ==
In alphabetical order

- Lya Christy
- Fritz Eckert
- John F. Hamilton as Grigory
- Paul Heidemann as Pawel
- Senia Kulatschkoff
- Marietta Millner as Sonja Iwanowna
- Paul Otto
- Iván Petrovich as Czarewitch
- Albert Steinrück as The Czar

== See also ==
- The Tsarevich (1933)
- The Little Czar (1954), also with Iván Petrovich
