= The Dollar Princess and Her Six Admirers =

1927 film

- German: Die Dollarprinzessin und ihre sechs Freier
- Directed by: Felix Basch
- Written by: Walter Reisch; Charlie Roellinghoff
- Produced by: Herman Millakowsky
- Starring: Liane Haid; Georg Alexander; Elisabeth Pinajeff
- Cinematography: Willy Hameister
- Music by: Leo Fall
- Production company: Greenbaum-Film
- Distributed by: Filmhaus Bruckmann
- Release date: 1 November 1927
- Country: Germany
- Languages: Silent; German intertitles

The Dollar Princess and Her Six Admirers (German: Die Dollarprinzessin und ihre sechs Freier) is a 1927 German silent film directed by Felix Basch and starring Liane Haid, Georg Alexander, and Elisabeth Pinajeff.

The film's sets were designed by the art director Robert Neppach.

== Cast ==
- Liane Haid as Liane
- Georg Alexander as Michael Rupp
- Elisabeth Pinajeff as Clarissa Cleart
- Sig Arno as Baron
- Betty Astor as Mizzi
- Hans Albers as secretary
- Jaro Fürth as Revisor
- Leopold von Ledebur as hotel director
- Josefine Dora as cook
