= Spring Awakening (1924 film) =

1924 film

- Directed by: Jacob Fleck; Luise Fleck
- Written by: Frank Wedekind (play Spring Awakening); Jacob Fleck; Adolf Lantz
- Starring: Frida Richard; Leopold von Ledebur; Erich Kaiser-Titz
- Cinematography: Mutz Greenbaum
- Production company: Vita-Film
- Release date: 11 January 1924
- Running time: 90 minutes
- Country: Austria
- Languages: Silent; German intertitles

Spring Awakening (German: Frühlingserwachen) is a 1924 Austrian silent drama film directed by Jacob Fleck and Luise Fleck and starring Frida Richard, Leopold von Ledebur and Erich Kaiser-Titz. It was adapted from the play of the same name by Frank Wedekind.

== Cast ==
- Charles Willy Kayser
- Leopold von Ledebur
- Erich Kaiser-Titz
- Magnus Stifter
- Frida Richard
- Olga Limburg
- Hertha Müller

== See also ==
- Spring Awakening (1929)

== Bibliography ==
- Elisabeth Büttner & Christian Dewald. Das tägliche Brennen: eine Geschichte des österreichischen Films von den Anfängen bis 1945, Volume 1. Residenz, 2002.
