= The Films of Princess Fantoche =

1921 film directed by Max Neufeld

- Directed by: Max Neufeld
- Starring: Liane Haid; Hermann Benke
- Production company: Vita-Film
- Release date: 15 April 1921
- Country: Austria
- Languages: Silent; German intertitles

The Films of Princess Fantoche (German: Die Filme der Prinzessin Fantoche) is a 1921 Austrian silent film directed by Max Neufeld and starring Liane Haid and Hermann Benke.

== Cast ==
- Liane Haid
- Marietta Weber
- Mario Bergugliano
- Karl Etlinger
- Hans Rhoden
- Julius Strobl
- Hermann Benke

== Bibliography ==
- Parish, James Robert (1977). Film Actors Guide: Western Europe. Metuchen, NJ: Scarecrow Press. ISBN 978-0-8108-1044-0.
