= Rigoletto (1918 film) =

1918 Austrian silent film

- Directed by: Jacob Fleck; Luise Fleck
- Written by: Victor Hugo (play)
- Produced by: Anton Kolm
- Starring: Wilhelm Klitsch; Hermann Benke; Liane Haid
- Production company: Wiener Kunstfilm
- Release date: 1 February 1918
- Country: Austro-Hungarian Empire
- Languages: Silent; German intertitles

Rigoletto or The King Amuses Himself (German: Der König amüsiert sich) is a 1918 Austrian silent historical film directed by Jacob Fleck, Luise Fleck and starring Wilhelm Klitsch, Hermann Benke and Liane Haid. It is based on the 1832 play by the French writer Victor Hugo. To recreate the look of Paris in the early sixteenth century, location shooting took place at the neo-Gothic Vienna City Hall.

== Cast ==
- Wilhelm Klitsch as Junger König
- Hermann Benke as Rigoletto
- Liane Haid as Blanche, Rigolettos Tochter
- Karl Ehmann as marquis Saint Vallier
- Eduard Sekler as Saltabadil, der Fischer
- Eugenie Bernay as Saint Valliers Tochter
- Anka Sandro as Saltabadils Schwester

== Bibliography ==
- Robert Von Dassanowsky. Austrian Cinema: A History. McFarland, 2005.
