= Our Emperor =

1933 film

- Directed by: Jacob Fleck; Luise Fleck
- Written by: Fritz Badener
- Produced by: Josef Staetter
- Starring: Karl Ehmann; Alfred Neugebauer; Susi Lanner
- Cinematography: Georg Muschner
- Music by: Max Niederberger
- Production company: Neue Hegewald Film
- Distributed by: Luxfilm Koppelmann & Reiter
- Release date: 19 September 1933
- Country: Austria
- Language: German

Our Emperor (German: Unser Kaiser) is a 1933 Austria period comedy film directed by Jacob Fleck and Luise Fleck and starring Karl Ehmann, Alfred Neugebauer and Susi Lanner. It takes place during the reign of Franz Joseph I of Austria. Location shooting took place in Bad Ischl and at the Burgtheater and Lainzer Tiergarten in Vienna.

== Cast ==
- Karl Ehmann as Emperor Franz Joseph I
- Alfred Neugebauer as Grand Duke Ivan
- Susi Lanner as Duchess Vera, his daughter
- Lizzi Holzschuh as Xenia Kyrillova
- Fred von Bohlen as Duke Ferdinand Rohmberg
- Georg Alexander as Baron Leopold Witzdorf
- Richard Godai as Ketterl, royal chamber servant
- Otto Hartmann as Official in ministry
- Hilde Koller as Royal cook
- John Mylong as Royal counsellor
- Hansi Niese as Frau Hartinger, his wife
- Wilhelm Schich as Peter Hartinger, head forest ranger
- Leo Slezak as Royal cook
- Gretl Theimer as Hartinger's daughter, Franzi
- Anton Tiller as Grandduke Peter Stefan
- Robert Valberg as Hofrat des Ministeriums
- Egon von Jordan as Anton Kneidinger, Forest ranger

== Bibliography ==
- Von Dassanowsky, Robert. Screening Transcendence: Film Under Austrofascism and the Hollywood Hope, 1933-1938. Indiana University Press, 2018
