= The Little Slave =

1928 film

- Directed by: Jacob Fleck; Luise Fleck
- Written by: Dietzenschmidt (play); Heinz Goldberg; Hans Rehfisch
- Starring: Grete Mosheim; Fritz Richard; Trude Hesterberg
- Cinematography: Eduard Hoesch
- Music by: Paul Dessau
- Production companies: Essem-Film; Nero-Film
- Distributed by: Deutsche Lichtspiel-Syndikat
- Release date: 20 September 1928
- Country: Germany
- Languages: Silent; German intertitles

The Little Slave (German: Die kleine Sklavin) is a 1928 German silent comedy film directed by Jacob Fleck and Luise Fleck and starring Grete Mosheim, Fritz Richard and Trude Hesterberg.

The film's art direction was by Erich Zander.

== Cast ==
- Grete Mosheim as Lilli
- Fritz Richard as Schmidt, ihr Pflegevater
- Trude Hesterberg as Meta Strippe
- Louis Ralph as Artisten-Franz
- Fred Louis Lerch as Robert Hartmann
- Walter Janssen as Richard Reimers
- Gina Manès as Norma, seine Frau

== Bibliography ==
- Alfred Krautz. International directory of cinematographers, set- and costume designers in film, Volume 4. Saur, 1984.
