= Crucified Girl =

1929 film

- Directed by: Jacob Fleck; Luise Fleck
- Written by: Marie Luise Droop; Ludwig Fritsch
- Produced by: Liddy Hegewald; Gustav Althoff
- Starring: Valerie Boothby; Gertrud de Lalsky; Evelyn Holt; Robert Leffler
- Cinematography: Nicolas Farkas
- Production company: Hegewald Film
- Distributed by: Hegewald Film
- Release date: 26 August 1929
- Running time: 101 minutes
- Country: Germany
- Languages: Silent; German intertitles

Crucified Girl (1929)

Crucified Girl (German: Mädchen am Kreuz) is a 1929 German silent drama film directed by Jacob Fleck and Luise Fleck and starring Valerie Boothby, Gertrud de Lalsky and Evelyn Holt. It was shot at the Johannisthal Studios in Berlin. The film's art direction was by Artur Gunther and August Rinaldi.

== Cast ==
In alphabetical order

- Valerie Boothby
- Gertrud de Lalsky
- Evelyn Holt
- Robert Leffler
- Fritz Odemar
- Livio Pavanelli
- Ernő Verebes
- Wolfgang Zilzer

== Bibliography ==
- Prawer, S.S. Between Two Worlds: The Jewish Presence in German and Austrian Film, 1910–1933. Berghahn Books, 2005.
