= Double Suicide (1918 film) =

- Directed by: Jacob Fleck; Luise Fleck
- Written by: Karl Anzengruber; Ludwig Anzengruber (play)
- Produced by: Anton Kolm
- Starring: Karl Ehmann; Liane Haid; Karl Baumgartner
- Production company: Wiener Kunstfilm
- Release date: 25 January 1918
- Country: Austro-Hungarian Empire
- Languages: Silent; German intertitles

Double Suicide or The Suicide Pact (German: Der Doppelselbstmord) is a 1918 German silent comedy film directed by Jacob Fleck and Luise Fleck and starring Karl Ehmann, Liane Haid, and Karl Baumgartner. It is based on the 1876 play of the same title by Ludwig Anzengruber.

== Plot ==
The country boy Poldl and the country girl Agerl are in love and want to get married, but their fathers have been enemies for many years and are against their relationship. When all of them meet at the local inn, the other villagers try to reconcile the two fathers, but in vain. In a newspaper, Poldl's father reads about the incessant rise of double suicides caused by broken hearts. This gives Poldl an idea. He runs away with Angerl. In the village shop they buy a piece of paper. Together they write a letter to their fathers, saying that they are going to commit suicide, because they are not allowed to get married. Then they hide in a barn at the outskirt of the village. When the two fathers read the letter, they get agonized and realize their faults. Together with some villagers they go out searching for the young couple. If Poldl and Angerl are still alive, their fathers will now consent to their marriage.

== Cast ==
- Karl Ehmann as Leutnerbauer
- Liane Haid as Angerl
- Karl Baumgartner as Stauderer
- Hans Rhoden
- Eduard Sekler as Poldl

== Bibliography ==
- Parish, Robert. Film Actors Guide. Scarecrow Press, 1977.
