= Trilby (1912 film) =

1912 film by Anton Kolm, Luise Kolm, Jacob Fleck, and Claudius Veltée

Trilby is a 1912 Austrian silent horror film, written and directed by Anton Kolm, Luise Kolm, Jacob Fleck, and Claudius Veltée. The screenplay is based on the novel by the same name by George du Maurier.

The film starred Paul Askonas as the Hungarian musician Svengali, and Elsa Galafrés as Trilby, a young singer hypnotised and dominated by Svengali.

At the time of its release, with a duration of 50 minutes, it was the longest film produced in Austria.

The current survival status of the film is unknown.
