= With God for Emperor and Empire =

- Directed by: Jacob Fleck; Luise Fleck
- Written by: Jacob Fleck; Luise Fleck
- Produced by: Anton Kolm
- Starring: Hermann Benke; Liane Haid
- Music by: Carl Michael Ziehrer
- Production company: Wiener Kunstfilm
- Release date: March 1916
- Running time: 55 minutes
- Country: Austro-Hungarian Empire
- Languages: Silent; German intertitles

With God for Emperor and Empire (German: Mit Gott für Kaiser und Reich) is a 1916 German silent war drama film directed by Jacob Fleck and Luise Fleck and starring Hermann Benke and Liane Haid. The celebrated operetta composer Karl Michael Ziehrer wrote a score to accompany the film at screenings.

It was one of a number of patriotic propaganda films made to support Austria's war effort during the First World War.

== Cast ==
- Hermann Benke as Major von Hess
- Josephine Josephi as his mother
- Liane Haid as his daughter Liane
- Hans Rhoden as Leutnant Falk

== Bibliography ==
- Robert Von Dassanowsky. Austrian Cinema: A History. McFarland, 2005.
