= Hans Rameau =

German screenwriter (1901–1980)

- Born: 28 November 1901; Berlin, German Empire
- Died: 9 April 1980 (aged 78); Gavignano, Lazio, Italy
- Other name: Paul H. Rameau
- Occupation: Writer
- Years active: 1919–1965 (film)

Hans Rameau (1901 – 1980) was a German screenwriter.

== Biography ==
Born Paul H. Gulder, he was the stepson of the actor and stage director Emil Rameau (actually Pulvermacher). He attended the Werner von Siemens High School in Berlin and graduated from high school in 1919. After training at the Berlin Reinhardt Seminar, Rameau played at the Neue Schauspielhaus in Königsberg in 1920 and at the Munich Kammerspiele from 1921 to 1924.

Rameau established himself in the film industry of the Weimar Republic. When the Nazi Party took power in 1933, Rameau went on to contribute to the movie Mazurka that was considered by the Nazis to be "artistically valuable". Since he was suspected of being homosexual he emigrated in 1935, first to Vienna, then to Rome, then to London in 1936, before moving to Hollywood in 1937. He returned to Europe in 1951.

== Selected filmography ==
- Jettatore (1919)
- The Pink Diamond (1926)
- My Friend Harry (1928)
- At Ruedesheimer Castle There Is a Lime Tree (1928)
- The Criminal of the Century (1928)
- Yacht of the Seven Sins (1928)
- The Insurmountable (1928)
- Tempo! Tempo! (1929)
- The Tsarevich (1929)
- His Best Friend (1929)
- Scandal in Baden-Baden (1929)
- The Love of the Brothers Rott (1929)
- Achtung! – Auto-Diebe! (1930)
- Him or Me (1930)
- The Citadel of Warsaw (1930)
- The Woman They Talk About (1931)
- Bobby Gets Going (1931)
- The Schlemihl (1931)
- Madame Pompadour (1931)
- Jumping Into the Abyss (1933)
- Manolescu, Prince of Thieves (1933)
- The World Without a Mask (1934)
- The Grand Duke's Finances (1934)
- A Night of Change (1935)
- Miracle of Flight (1935)
- But It's Nothing Serious (1936)
- His Best Friend (1937)
- Confession (1937)
- Waterloo Bridge (1940)
- Madame Curie (1943)
- Maria Theresa (1951)
- All Clues Lead to Berlin (1952)
- It Was Always So Nice With You (1954)
- The Little Czar (1954)
- Munchhausen in Africa (1958)
- The Transport (1961)

== Bibliography ==
- Hardt, Ursula. From Caligari to California: Erich Pommer's life in the International Film Wars. Berghahn Books, 1996.
