= The Ancestress =

1919 Austrian film

- Directed by: Jacob Fleck; Luise Fleck
- Screenplay by: Luise Fleck; Jakob Fleck
- Based on: Die Ahnfrau (1817), a play by Franz Grillparzer
- Produced by: Anton Kolm; Luise Fleck; Jakob Fleck
- Starring: Liane Haid; Max Neufeld; Karl Ehmann
- Production company: Wiener Kunstfilm
- Release date: November 1919
- Running time: 84 minutes
- Country: Austria
- Languages: Silent; German intertitles

The Ancestress (German: Die Ahnfrau) is a 1919 Austrian silent drama film directed by Jacob Fleck and Luise Fleck and starring Liane Haid, Max Neufeld and Karl Ehmann. The same story had previously been shot in 1910.

The film's sets were designed by the art director Alfred Meschkan.

== Cast ==
- Liane Haid – Tochter Berta
- Max Neufeld – Jaromir von Eschen
- Karl Ehmann – Graf Zdenko von Borotin
- Eugen Neufeld – Hauptmann
- Josef Recht – Räuber Boleslav
- Eduard Sekler – Kastellan

== Bibliography ==
- Parish, Robert. Film Actors Guide. Scarecrow Press, 1977.
