= Eugen Neufeld =

Austrian-Jewish film actor

Eugen Neufeld (6 December 1882 in Göding – 18 October 1950 in Vienna) was an Austrian-Jewish film actor. He was the older brother of actor and director Max Neufeld.

== Selected filmography ==
- The Priest from Kirchfeld (1914)
- The Ancestress (1919)
- Light of His Life (1921)
- The Woman in White (1921)
- The Dead Wedding Guest (1922)
- East and West (1923)
- The Iron King (1923)
- The Tales of Hoffmann (1923)
- The City Without Jews (1924)
- Gulliver's Travels (1924)
- Colonel Redl (1925)
- A Waltz by Strauss (1925)
- Sons in Law (1926)
- The Arsonists of Europe (1926)
- Her Highness Dances the Waltz (1926)
- Alpine Tragedy (1927)
- The Bordello in Rio (1927)
- German Women - German Faithfulness (1927)
- The Beloved of His Highness (1928)
- At Ruedesheimer Castle There Is a Lime Tree (1928)
- The Most Beautiful Woman in Paris (1928)
- When the Guard Marches (1928)
- A Girl with Temperament (1928)
- Strauss Is Playing Today (1928)
- Love in the Cowshed (1928)
- Ship of Girls (1929)
- Victoria and Her Hussar (1931)
- Without Meyer, No Celebration is Complete (1931)
- The Tsar's Diamond (1932)
- For Once I'd Like to Have No Troubles (1932)
- Adventures on the Lido (1933)
- A Star Fell from Heaven (1934)
- Her Highness Dances the Waltz (1935)
- Viennese Melodies (1947)
- Anni (1948)
- Beloved of the World (1949)

== Bibliography ==
- Jung, Uli & Schatzberg, Walter. Beyond Caligari: The Films of Robert Wiene. Berghahn Books, 1999.
