= Fred Louis Lerch =

Austrian actor (1902–1985)

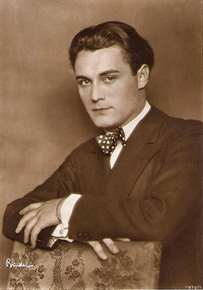
- German postcard 1928
- Born: Alois Lerch; 28 March 1902; Ernsdorf, Austria-Hungary
- Died: 26 August 1985 (aged 83); Munich, West Germany
- Occupations: Actor; Production manager
- Spouse: Actress Grete Reinwald

Fred Louis Lerch (28 March 1902 – 26 August 1985) was an Austrian actor who was a star of German films. From 1951 till 1961 he worked again for German cinema as a production manager.

== Selected filmography ==
- The Portrait (1923)
- A Waltz by Strauss (1925)
- Carmen (1926)
- The Young Man from the Ragtrade (1926)
- Flirtation (1927)
- The Family without Morals (1927)
- The Prince's Child (1927)
- Sealed Lips (1927)
- Mariett Dances Today (1928)
- Rutschbahn (1928)
- The Little Slave (1928)
- Parisiennes (1928)
- Mary Lou (1928)
- Fair Game (1928)
- Black Forest Girl (1929)
- The Crimson Circle (1929)
- Play Around a Man (1929)
- Der Walzerkönig (1930)
- Student Life in Merry Springtime (1931)
- By a Nose (1931)
