= Elsa Galafrés =

German actress (1879-1977)

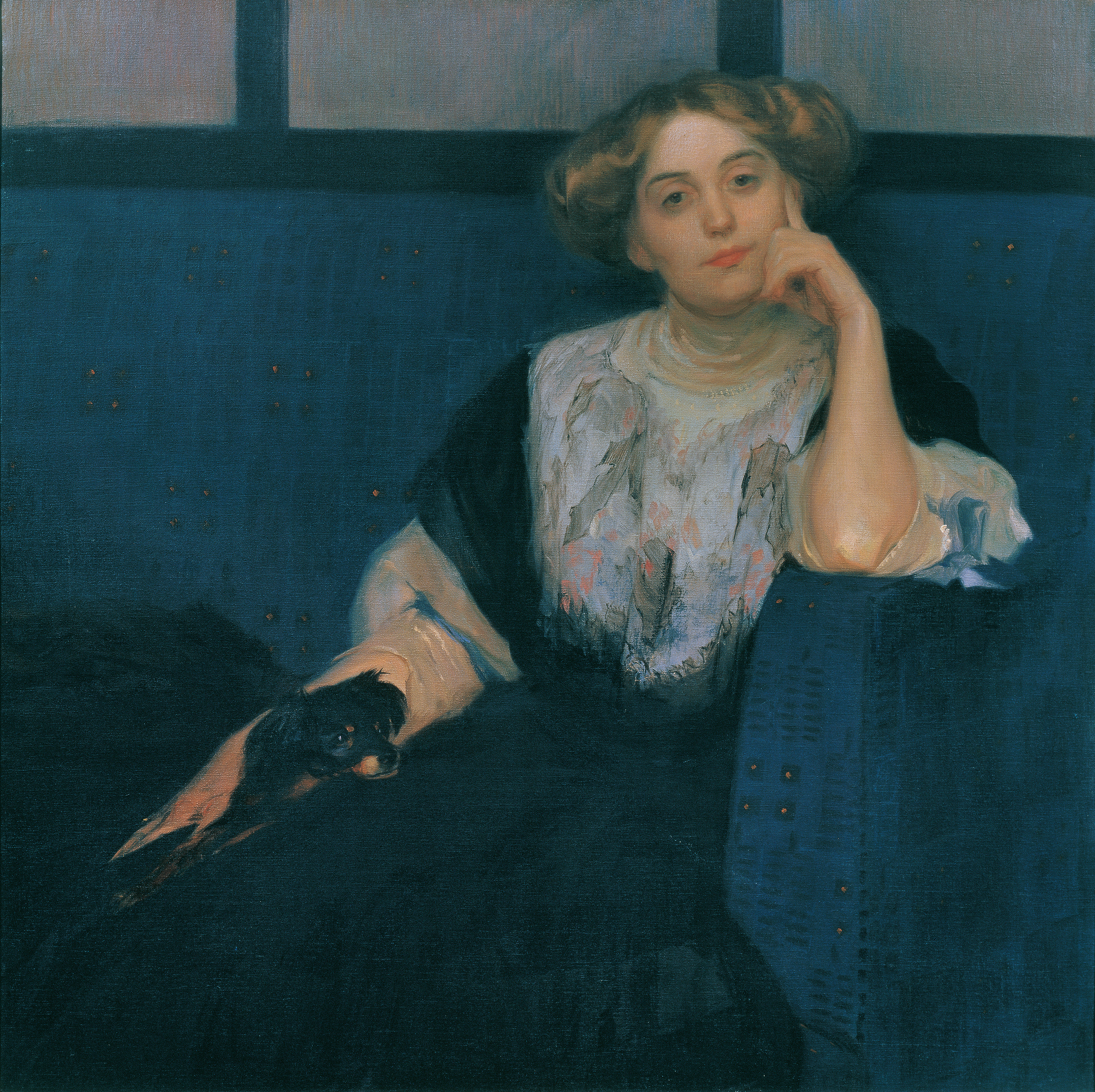
- 1908 painting of Galafrés by Otto Friedrich
- Born: 23 May 1879; Berlin, Germany
- Died: 16 April 1977 (aged 97); Vancouver, Canada
- Occupation: Actress
- Spouse(s): Bronislaw Huberman (1910–1919); Ernõ Dohnányi (1919–1949); Clifton Stewart (?–1977)

Elsa Galafrés (sometimes spelt Elza; 23 May 1879 – 16 April 1977) was a German stage and film actress.

== Early life ==
Galafrés was born in Berlin, Germany. She trained as a pianist, and debuted as a concert pianist at the age of 14 on 1 December 1893, together with the Berlin Philharmonic. Although this performance was well received, she did not pursue a career in music, instead deciding to become an actor.

== Theatre career ==
At the age of fifteen, Galafrés gave recitations at a charity concert in Havelberg. She took lessons from the actress and singer Ottilie Genée and caught the interest of the director Friedrich Haase, who hired her to play Ellen Friborg in Am Spieltisch des Lebens at a guest performance in Halle in December 1894.

Her first engagement was at the Hoftheater in Berlin, where she debuted as Perdita, one of the main characters in Shakespeare's The Winter's Tale. In 1896 she played the Queen in Friedrich Schiller's Don Carlos at the city theater in Riga, and as an 18-year-old she was engaged by a theater in Hanover, where she remained for three years.

In the 1910s she also appeared on film: in the Austrian horror film Trilby, based on the popular novel Trilby by George du Maurier, and Durch Nacht zum Licht, directed by Carl Schönfeld.

== Personal life ==
Galafrés was married three times. In 1910, she married the violinist and composer Bronisław Huberman, with whom she had a son, Johannes. The marriage was passionate but often tempestuous, and in 1913 she sought a divorce in order to marry the Hungarian pianist and composer Ernst von Dohnányi. Both Huberman and Dohnányi's first wife refused to grant their spouses a divorce, but the couple lived together in Budapest, where their son Matthew was born in 1917. In 1919 their respective divorces were granted, they got married in June of that year, and Dohnányi adopted Johannes. They were married until 1949, although by that time they had been separated for several years. After the divorce from Dohnányi, Galafrés emigrated to Canada, where she met her third husband, the physician Clifton Stewart. The couple lived near Vancouver until her death in 1977.

== Filmography ==
- 1912: Trilby
- 1915: Durch Nacht zum Licht
