= Der Millionenonkel =

The Millionaire Uncle
- Directed by: Hubert Marishka, Alexander Kolowrat
- Written by: Hubert Marischka, Ernst Marischka
- Produced by: Alexander Kolowrat
- Starring: Alexander Girardi, Hilde Radney, Marietta Weber, Bernhard Baumeister, Leo Fall, Alexander Kolowrat
- Production company: Sascha-Film
- Release date: 1913
- Country: Austria-Hungary
- Languages: Silent; German intertitles

Der Millionenonkel (English: The Millionaire Uncle) is a 1913 Austrian silent film directed by Hubert Marischka and Alexander Kolowrat. It was Austria's first feature film.

Filmed in just five weeks in Vienna, Austria, the film served primarily as a vehicle for Alexander Girardi's characters. The musical score was composed by Robert Stolz, who also conducted the orchestra at its premier on 10 September 1913 at Beethovenplatz (Vienna). Reviewers of the time were critical of Girardi's performance, as he had difficulties combining the roles of stage actor and film actor, but it was a commercial success in both Germany and Austria-Hungary. This was partially due to Girardi's reputation, which was enhanced by advertising.
