= The Prince's Child =

1927 film

- Directed by: Jacob Fleck; Luise Fleck
- Written by: Edmond About (novel Le Roi des montagnes); Viktor Léon (libretto Das Fürstenkind); Jacob Fleck; Adolf Lantz
- Produced by: Liddy Hegewald
- Starring: Harry Liedtke; Vivian Gibson; Evi Eva
- Cinematography: Eduard Hoesch
- Music by: Franz Lehár
- Production company: Hegewald Film
- Distributed by: Hegewald Film
- Release date: 22 June 1927
- Country: Germany
- Languages: Silent; German intertitles

The Prince's Child (German: Das Fürstenkind) is a 1927 German silent drama film directed by Jacob Fleck and Luise Fleck, starring Harry Liedtke, Vivian Gibson and Evi Eva. It is based on Franz Lehár's 1909 operetta of the same name.

The film's sets were designed by the art director Jacek Rotmil.

== Cast ==
- Harry Liedtke as Hadschi Stavros, Fürst von Parnes
- Vivian Gibson as Mary Ann Barley
- Evi Eva as Dolly Barley
- Fred Louis Lerch as Bill Harrys
- Adolphe Engers as Dr. Hyppolyte Clerinay
- Iwa Wanja as Photini, Prinzessin von Parnes
- Teddy Bill as Trottulos

== Bibliography ==
- Bock, Hans-Michael & Bergfelder, Tim. The Concise CineGraph. Encyclopedia of German Cinema. Berghahn Books, 2009.
