= Wilhelm Klitsch =

Austrian actor

- Born: 25 November 1882; Vienna, Austria-Hungary
- Died: 24 February 1941 (aged 58); Vienna, Nazi Germany
- Occupations: Actor, Director
- Years active: 1916-1920 (film)

Wilhelm Klitsch (1882–1941) was an Austrian stage and film actor of the silent era.

== Selected filmography ==
- On the Heights (1916)
- The Spendthrift (1917)
- In the Line of Duty (1917)
- Lebenswogen (1917)
- Rigoletto (1918)
- The Voice of Conscience (1920)
- The Master of Life (1920)

== Bibliography ==
- Klossner, Michael. The Europe of 1500-1815 on Film and Television: A Worldwide Filmography of Over 2550 Works, 1895 Through 2000. McFarland, 2002.
