= The Priest from Kirchfeld (1914 film) =

1914 Austrian film

- Directed by: Jacob Fleck; Luise Fleck
- Written by: Ludwig Anzengruber (play)
- Starring: Max Neufeld; Hans Rhoden; Polly Janisch
- Production company: Wiener Kunstfilm
- Release date: 30 October 1914
- Country: Austria
- Languages: Silent; German intertitles

The Priest from Kirchfeld (German: Der Pfarrer von Kirchfeld) is a 1914 Austrian silent film directed by Jacob Fleck and Luise Fleck and starring Max Neufeld, Hans Rhoden and Polly Janisch. It is based on the play Der Pfarrer von Kirchfeld by Ludwig Anzengruber.

== Cast ==
- Max Neufeld as Pfarrer Hell
- Hans Rhoden as Wurzensepp
- Polly Janisch as Anna Birkmeier
- Lilly Karoly
- Eugen Neufeld
- Ludwig Trautmann as Der Pfarrer

== Bibliography ==
- Goble, Alan. The Complete Index to Literary Sources in Film. Walter de Gruyter, 1999.
