= In the Line of Duty (1917 film) =

- Directed by: Jacob Fleck; Luise Fleck
- Written by: Ludwig Anzengruber (play Hand und Herz); Jacob Fleck; Luise Fleck
- Produced by: Anton Kolm
- Starring: Wilhelm Klitsch; Marie Marchal; Karl Baumgartner
- Production company: Wiener Kunstfilm
- Release date: 7 November 1917
- Country: Austro-Hungarian Empire
- Languages: Silent; German intertitles

In the Line of Duty (German: Im Banne der Pflicht) is a 1917 Austrian silent drama film directed by Jacob Fleck and Luise Fleck and starring Wilhelm Klitsch, Marie Marchal and Karl Baumgartner.

== Cast ==
- Wilhelm Klitsch as Großbauer Weller
- Marie Marchal as Katharina
- Karl Baumgartner as Bettelmönch Augustin
- Josef Reithofer as Friedner
- Viktor Franz as Knecht Hans

== Bibliography ==
- Robert Von Dassanowsky. Austrian Cinema: A History. McFarland, 2005.
