= Hubert Marischka =

Austrian opera singer

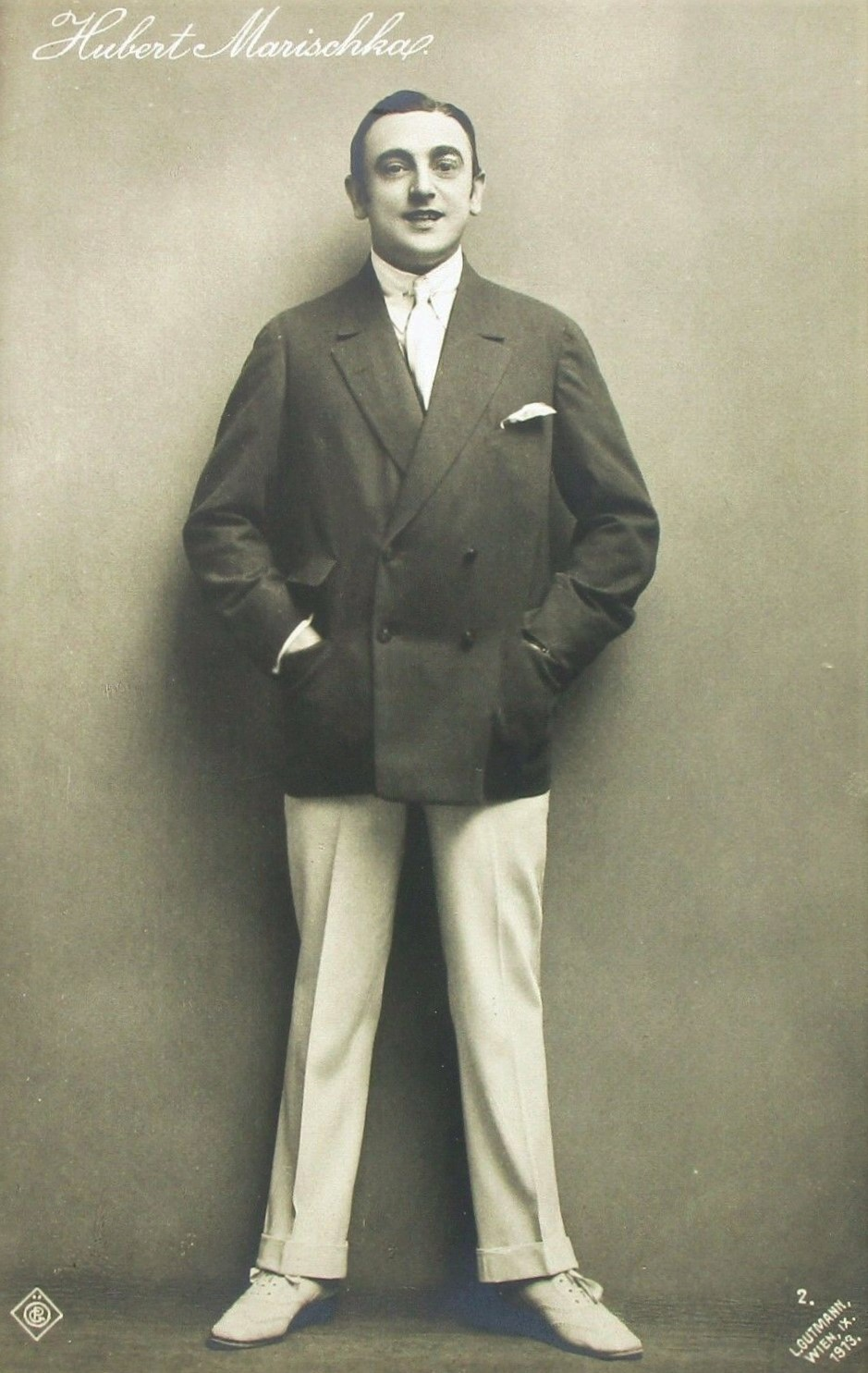
Hubert Marischka by Ludwig Gutmann, 1913

Hubert Marischka (27 August 1882 – 4 December 1959), brother of Ernst Marischka, was an Austrian operetta tenor, actor, film director and screenwriter.

== Career ==
Marischka was born in Brunn am Gebirge, the son of Jiří (or Johann) Marischka, a supplier to the court of the Austro-Hungarian monarchy, and his wife Bertha. Hubert began work as a joiner but trained as a singer and in 1904 began a new career in operetta in the town theatre of St. Pölten in Der arme Jonathan by Karl Millöcker. He had his first success as a singer in Brno in 1906, as Danilo in Die lustige Witwe. On 27 July 1907 he sang at the premiere of the Der fidele Bauer by Leo Fall in Mannheim.

On 23 December 1908 he appeared on stage for the first time in Vienna at the Carltheater in Fall's Die geschiedene Frau. From then on he was particularly successful in the Theater an der Wien, where later he worked as director, mostly of operettas. In 1923 he rose to be director of the Theater an der Wien. On 28 February 1924 he was responsible for the premiere of the operetta Gräfin Mariza. At the end of the 1920s he sang at the Wiener Staatsoper in Eine Nacht in Venedig. For a time Marischka was also director of the Stadttheater Wien and of the Raimundtheater, director of the Papageno Music Publishers and a professor of operetta at the Akademie für Musik und darstellende Kunst.

== Films ==
He made contact early on with the new medium of film, in which he worked as actor, director and screenwriter. His films are often of the Wiener Film genre. With Hans Moser he made such well-known films as Wir bitten zum Tanz (1941) and Der Herr Kanzleirat (1948).

== Personal life ==
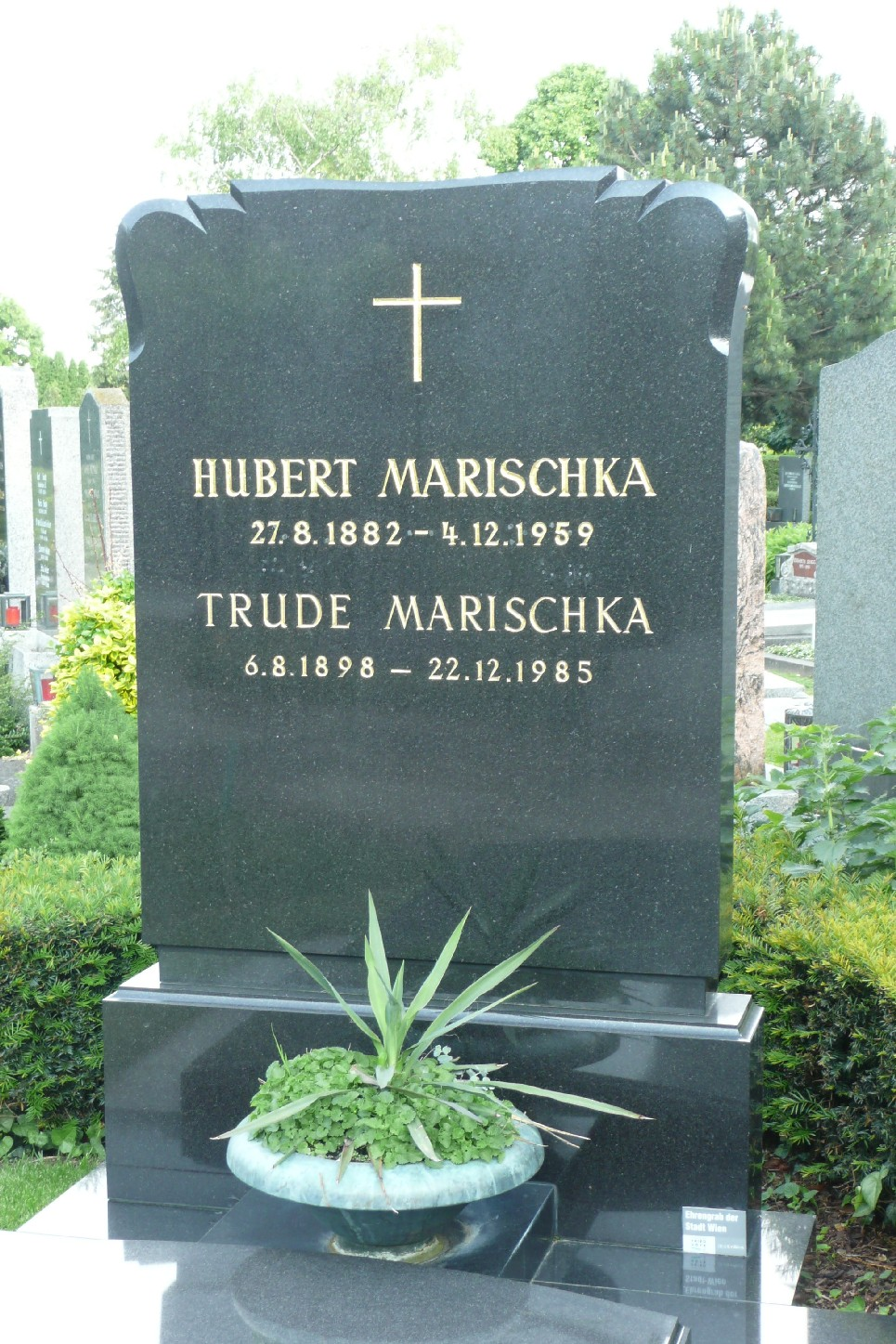
Grave of Hubert Marischka and his wife Trude Basch-Havel Marischka at the Hietzing Cemetery in Vienna.

In 1907 he married Lizzy Léon (d. 1918), daughter of the librettist Viktor Léon. They had three children: Lisl Marischka, actress, 1908–1945, who married in 1933 Austrian baron Alfons von Gecmen-Waldeck; Viktor Marischka, born 1915; and the director Franz Marischka, born 1918. Hubert Marischka married as his second wife Lilian "Lilly" Karczag, daughter of the theatre director Wilhelm Karczag, and from this marriage had two more children, the director Georg Marischka, 1922–1999, and Tassilo Marischka, born 1928. This marriage ended in divorce. During World War II he was married for a short time to his third wife, Juliane. In 1946 he was married for the fourth and last time to the actress Trude Basch-Havel. Hubert Marischka died in Vienna, and is buried in the Hietzing Cemetery in Hietzing.

== Filmography ==
- 1913: Die Feuerprobe (actor)
- 1913: Der Millionenonkel / Der Verschwender (actor, co-screenwriter, co-director)
- 1915: With Heart and Hand for the Fatherland (actor)
- 1915: Zwei Freunde (actor, co-director)
- 1915: Der Schusterprinz (screenwriter)
- 1915: Das erste Weib (director, screenwriter)
- 1916: On the Heights (actor)
- 1917: The Black Hand (actor)
- 1918: Wo die Lerche singt (actor, co-screenwriter)
- 1918: Der Tribut des Künstlers (short film; actor)
- 1918: Um ein Weib (actor, co-director)
- 1932: Countess Mariza (actor)
- 1935: Die ganze Welt dreht sich um Liebe / Liebesmelodie (screenwriter)
- 1936: Confetti (director)
- 1939: Drunter und drüber (director, co-screenwriter)
- 1939: Hochzeitsreise zu dritt (director, co-screenwriter)
- 1939: Das Glück wohnt nebenan (director, co-screenwriter)
- 1940: Herzensfreud - Herzensleid (director, co-screenwriter)
- 1940: The Unfaithful Eckehart (director)
- 1941: Wir bitten zum Tanz (director)
- 1941: Oh diese Männer (director)
- 1942: Vienna Blood (1942) (co-screenwriter)
- 1943: The Master Detective (director)
- 1943: Drei tolle Mädels (director)
- 1943: A Man for My Wife (director)
- 1943: A Waltz with You (director, co-screenwriter)
- 1943: Alles aus Liebe (director, co-screenwriter)
- 1944: Ein Mann gehört ins Haus (director)
- 1947: Wiener Melodien (co-director)
- 1948: Der Herr Kanzleirat (director, screenwriter)
- 1950: Kissing Is No Sin (director, co-screenwriter)
- 1951: Stadtpark / Kleiner Peter, große Sorgen (director, co-screenwriter)
- 1951: Der fidele Bauer (co-screenwriter)
- 1951: The Csardas Princess (actor)
- 1951: City Park
- 1952: Knall and Fall as Imposters (director)
- 1952: The Land of Smiles (co-screenwriter)
- 1952: Rose of the Mountain (director, co-screenwriter)
- 1953: Die Perle von Tokay (director, co-screenwriter)
- 1955: Let the Sun Shine Again (director)
- 1956: Love, Summer and Music (director, co-screenwriter)
