= Evelyn Holt =

German actress (1908–2001)

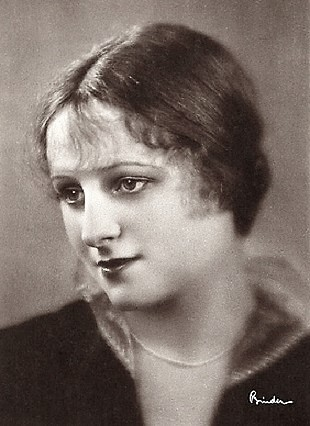
- Born: Edith Toni Elsbeth Wenckens; October 3, 1908; Berlin, German Empire
- Died: February 22, 2001 (aged 92); Los Angeles, California, U.S.
- Occupation: Actress
- Years active: 1926–1933
- Spouse: Felix Guggenheim (m.1936–1976, his death)

Evelyn Holt (born Edith Toni Elsbeth Wenckens; 3 October 1908 – 22 February 2001) was a German actress.

== Biography ==
The daughter of a journalist, she began her film career at UFA. She quickly advanced to starring roles alongside Gustav Fröhlich and Hans Albers. After singing lessons, she was committed in 1931 as a soubrette at the Grosses Schauspielhaus in Berlin. However, the Nazi takeover ended her film career after six successful years, since she was allegedly half-Jewish. Holt was prohibited from appearing in films. She still enjoyed engagements as a soubrette at the Komische Oper in Berlin. When Jewish publisher Felix Guggenheim (1904–1976) married her in 1936, it was no longer possible. In 1938 the couple emigrated first to Switzerland, then in 1940 to England, and later to the United States. There Guggenheim was exile publisher of authors such as Thomas Mann, Franz Werfel, Lion Feuchtwanger, and Alfred Doblin. Evelyn Holt remained until the end of her life in the U.S. and never returned to movies.

== Selected filmography ==
- Lace (1926)
- Orphan of Lowood (1926)
- Flirtation (1927)
- Die elf Teufel (1927)
- The Eighteen Year Old (1927)
- The Gallant Hussar (1928)
- Fair Game (1928)
- Marriage in Trouble (1929)
- Crucified Girl (1929)
- The Three Kings (1929)
- The Man with the Frog (1929)
- The Veil Dancer (1929)
- Marriage in Name Only (1930)
- The Right to Love (1930)
- Ash Wednesday (1931)
- One Hour of Happiness (1931)
- The Scoundrel (1931)
- Three from the Unemployment Office (1932)
- Contest (1932)

== Bibliography ==
- Prawer, S.S. Between Two Worlds: The Jewish Presence in German and Austrian Film, 1910-1933. Berghahn Books, 2007.
