= The Orlov =

1927 German film

- German: Der Orlow
- Directed by: Jacob Fleck; Luise Fleck
- Written by: Bruno Granichstaedten (operetta); Ernst Marischka (operetta); Alfred Schirokauer
- Produced by: Liddy Hegewald
- Starring: Vivian Gibson; Hans Junkermann; Georg Alexander
- Cinematography: Eduard Hoesch
- Music by: Walter Ulfig
- Production company: Hegewald Film
- Distributed by: Hegewald Film
- Release date: 6 October 1927
- Running time: 101 minutes
- Country: Germany
- Languages: Silent; German intertitles

The Orlov (German: Der Orlow) is a 1927 German silent romantic comedy film directed by Jacob Fleck and Luise Fleck and starring Vivian Gibson, Hans Junkermann and Georg Alexander. It was shot at the Babelsberg and Staaken Studios in Berlin. The film's sets were designed by the art director Jacek Rotmil.

== Cast ==
- Vivian Gibson as Nadja Nadjakowska - née Lady Proschaja
- Hans Junkermann as John Walsh
- Georg Alexander as Jolly Jefferson
- Bruno Kastner as Alexander Alexandrowitsch
- Max Ralph-Ostermann as Watson - police commissioner
- Evi Eva as Dolly Marbanks - Jolly's secretary
- Iván Petrovich as Alexander - Russian exile
- Ernst Behmer as Iwan Stephanow - Russian exile
- Weinau-Schallay as Leuchtturmwächter Flugzeugfabrik
