= Luise Fleck =

Austrian film director (1873–1950)

Luise and Jacob Fleck c.1937

Luise Fleck, also known as Luise Kolm or Luise Kolm-Fleck, née Louise or Luise Veltée (1 August 1873–15 March 1950), was an Austrian film director, and has been considered the second ever female feature film director in the world, after Alice Guy-Blaché. She is also noted for her long-standing professional partnership and co-direction of films with her spouse Jacob Fleck. Her son from her first marriage, Walter Kolm-Veltée, was also a noted film director. Chronologically, however, the second female feature film director in the world after Alice Guy-Blaché was Ebba Lindkvist, having debuted as a film maker one year before Luise Fleck.

== Biography ==
=== Austria, Wiener Kunstfilm and Vita-Film: to 1926 ===
Luise was born in Vienna, the daughter of Louis Veltée, proprietor of the city panopticon, descended from a family originating in Lyon, who had settled in Austria in the early 19th century. Her brother was Claudius Veltée, also later known as a film director.

Even in her childhood she helped her father in his business by working on the till. In January 1910, she and her first husband, Anton Kolm, along with the cameraman Jacob Fleck and her brother Claudius, set up the Erste österreichische Kinofilms-Industrie, the earliest significant film production company in Austria, with financial support from a number of sources, including Luise's father. It was renamed the Österreichisch-Ungarische Kinoindustrie GmbH a year later, and at the end of 1911, after a major financial reconstruction, was renamed the Wiener Kunstfilm-Industrie.

The company's first productions were short documentary pieces made in Vienna and other parts of the Austro-Hungarian Empire. Competition was tough, as the new company was up against the very large international French film companies that dominated the Austria market at the time.

The French companies were expelled from Austria at the beginning of World War I, but there was new competition in the form of the extremely wealthy Sascha-Film company, also Austrian. During the war the two companies struggled for dominance in the newsreel and propaganda markets, but the superior financial resources of Sascha-Film saw them firmly in the leading position by 1918, and carried them through the economic and political collapse of Austria immediately following the end of the war. Wiener Kunstfilm was obliged to dissolve, but Anton Kolm was able to re-structure its finances and relaunch the company as Vita-Film in 1919.

Work began immediately on prestigious new film studios at Rosenhügel in Mauer, but in 1922, as a result of severe disagreements with their financial backers, Anton and Luise Kolm and Jacob Fleck severed their connection with Vita-Film. Anton died later in the same year. Luise and Fleck married in 1924 and left for Berlin in 1926.

=== Germany 1926-33; Austria 1933-40 ===
In Germany Luise and her husband worked for Berlin production companies, particularly for Liddy Hegewald and UFA. During this period they made between 30 and 40 films, sometimes as many as nine in a single year. When Hitler took power in 1933 they returned to Vienna, as Jacob was Jewish, but continued to produce for "Hegewald-Film" in Vienna and Prague, while Luise's son Walter Kolm-Veltée, who had taken a qualification in sound production at Tobis-Tonbild-Syndikat, was nominally responsible for direction.

When in 1938 the National Socialists also took power in Austria in the Anschluss, and control over the Austrian film industry passed virtually overnight into the hands of the Reichskulturkammer, there was no more work for them.

=== Exile 1940-47 ===
Jacob Fleck was interned in 1938 in Dachau Concentration Camp, but was released in 1940, when he and Luise went into exile in Shanghai. They co-operated with the Chinese director Fei Mu in the co-direction of the film Söhne und Töchter der Welt ("Sons and Daughters of the World"), which before the establishment of the People's Republic of China was the only collaboration between Chinese and foreign film makers. Its premiere took place on 4 October 1941 in the Yin Du Theatre in Shanghai.

=== Return to Austria 1947-50 ===
In 1947, the same year in which Austria's first post-war film studio opened the Flecks returned to Vienna to plan their comeback, which however never materialised, although a few films were made under the name of a revived Neuer Wiener-Kunstfilm. Luise Fleck died in 1950, Jacob Fleck three years later.

== Works ==
In 1911 her first credited work as co-director was released: Die Glückspuppe ("Good Luck Doll"). Other dramas followed in the same year: Der Dorftrottel ("The Village Idiot"), Tragödie eines Fabriksmädels ("Tragedy of a Factory Girl") and Nur ein armer Knecht ("Just a Poor Fellow"). In 1913 were premiered her works as director and producer "Der Psychiater" ("The Psychiatrist") and Das Proletarierherz ("The Proletarian Heart").

During World War I, she directed the pro-Habsburg propaganda dramas Mit Herz und Hand fürs Vaterland ("With Hand and Heart for the Fatherland") (1915) and Mit Gott für Kaiser und Reich ("With God for Kaiser and Reich") (1916). In 1918 appeared Der Doppelselbstmord ("The Double Suicide").

She also made use of Austrian literature in Die Ahnfrau ("The Ancestress"), based on the play of the same name by Franz Grillparzer, and Lumpazivagabundus, both from 1919. From 1911 to 1922, the year in which her husband Anton died, Luise is known to have directed over 45 films, and the number may have been considerably higher.

Luise Kolm, as she was then called, was principally responsible for the studio's production of socially critical dramas that dealt with questions of class conflict and ideological questions, unlike the standard productions of other film studios of the time. The actor Eduard Sekler, who worked for Wiener Kunstfilm, described her in this way: "Luise Kolm was a brilliant all-round talent while her husband Kolm just looked after the money - she did everything, she cut and spliced the films, wrote the intertitles and helped her brother in the laboratory. Without her drive and initiative it's doubtful if the firm could have remained in existence."

Further works by her were the film adaptation of Arthur Schnitzler's middle-class tragedy Flirtation in 1927 and When the Soldiers in 1931. The Priest from Kirchfeld appeared in cinemas in 1937. It was Luise and Jacob Fleck's first sound film production of the well-known anti-clerical play of 1870 by Ludwig Anzengruber, after two silent films 1914 and 1926. It was intended as anti-Nazi and pro-Catholic "Austria propaganda", but was not perceived as such by the critics, who misinterpreted and discounted it.

Altogether Luise Fleck wrote at least 18 screenplays, directed 53 films and produced 129 films. Some sources assume far higher figures, allowing for her work being often uncredited.

== Selected filmography ==
- Die Glückspuppe (1911)
- The Wedding of Valeni (1914)
- The Priest from Kirchfeld (1914)
- With Heart and Hand for the Fatherland (1915)
- On the Heights (1916)
- The Tragedy of Castle Rottersheim (1916)
- The Vagabonds (1916)
- Summer Idyll (1916)
- With God for Emperor and Empire (1916)
- The Stain of Shame (1917)
- Lebenswogen (1917)
- The Black Hand (1917)
- In the Line of Duty (1917)
- The Spendthrift (1917)
- Rigoletto (1918)
- Double Suicide (1918)
- Don Cesar, Count of Irun (1918)
- The Ancestress (1919)
- The Master of Life (1920)
- Eva, The Sin (1920)
- Let the Little Ones Come to Me (1920)
- Doctor Ruhland (1920)
- Trance (1920) aka Anita
- The Dancing Death (1920)
- The Voice of Conscience (1920)
- Spring Awakening (1924)
- The Priest from Kirchfeld (1926)
- The Orlov (1927)
- A Girl of the People (1927)
- The Prince's Child (1927)
- Flirtation (1927)
- The Beggar Student (1927)
- The Merry Vineyard (1927)
- Doctor Schäfer (1928)
- The Beloved of His Highness (1928)
- Yacht of the Seven Sins (1928)
- The Little Slave (1928)
- The Most Beautiful Woman in Paris (1928)
- His Majesty's Lieutenant (1929)
- The Happy Vagabonds (1929)
- The Tsarevich (1929)
- Crucified Girl (1929)
- The Right to Love (1930)
- The Citadel of Warsaw (1930)
- When the Soldiers (1931)
- An Auto and No Money (1932)
- Our Emperor (1933)
- The Priest from Kirchfeld (1937)

== Sources ==
- Nepf, Markus. Die Pionierarbeit von Anton Kolm, Louise Velteé/Kolm/Fleck und Jacob Fleck bis zu Beginn des 1. Weltkrieges. Thesis. Vienna 1991, 200 S. (ÖFA Wien)
- Teng; Guoqiang. Fluchtpunkt Shanghai. Luise und Jakob Fleck in China 1939–1946. In: Film-Exil SDK (4/1994)
- Dassanowsky, Robert von. Female Visions: Four Female Austrian Film Pioneers. In: Modern Austrian Literature. Vol. 32, No. 1, 1999
