= Liane Haid =

Austrian actress and singer (1895–2000)

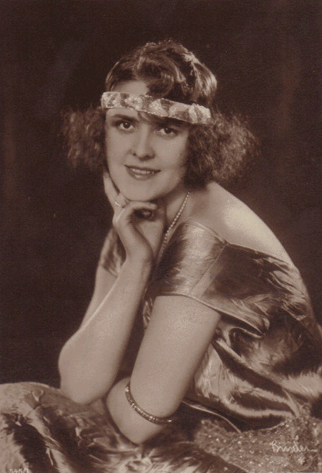
- Haid, c. 1924
- Born: Juliane Haid; 16 August 1895; Vienna, Austria-Hungary
- Died: 28 November 2000 (aged 105); Bern, Switzerland
- Occupations: Actress, singer
- Years active: 1915–1953
- Spouse(s): Baron Fritz von Haymerle (divorced 1923); Hans Somborn (divorced 1937) Carl Spycher (m. 1943)
- Children: 1
- Relatives: Grit Haid (sister)

Juliane "Liane" Haid (16 August 1895 – 28 November 2000) was an Austrian actress and singer. She has often been referred to as Austria's first movie star.

== Biography ==
Juliane Haid was born in Vienna on 16 August 1895, the first child to Georg Haid (1864–1951) and Juliane Haid (1873–1939). She had two younger sisters, Grit (1900– 1938), who also became an actress, and Johanna (1903–1964).

Haid trained both as a dancer and singer and became the epitome of the Süßes Wiener Mädel ("Sweet Viennese Girl") and a popular pin-up throughout the 1920s and 1930s. Her first motion picture was a propaganda film made during the First World War, Mit Herz und Hand fürs Vaterland (1916). She worked for UFA and, as a trained singer, easily made the transition to the sound era, appearing in comedy films alongside Austrian and German stars such as Willi Forst, Bruno Kastner, Georg Alexander, Theo Lingen, and Heinz Rühmann. Her first husband, Baron Fritz von Haymerle, helped her found her film company, Micco-Film.

Having refused several offers from Hollywood, she left Germany for Switzerland in 1942 "because of the regime, because everything was bombed, and because all the good directors had left". She married Carl Spycher and ended her film career. Spycher adopted Liane's son, Pierre (born 1940), from her second marriage to Hans Somborn.

Her notable films include Lady Hamilton (1921; her breakthrough role); Lucrezia Borgia (1922); The Csardas Princess (1927, based on the operetta by Emmerich Kálmán); and the talkies The Song Is Ended (1930) and Ungeküsst soll man nicht schlafen gehn (1936). She made her last film appearance in 1953. Haid died in Bern, Switzerland in 2000.

== Filmography ==
- With Heart and Hand for the Fatherland (1915)
- Summer Idyll (1916)
- With God for Emperor and Empire (1916)
- The Vagabonds (1916)
- The Tragedy of Castle Rottersheim (1916)
- On the Heights (1916)
- Lebenswogen (1917)
- The Black Hand (1917)
- The Stain of Shame (1917)
- The Spendthrift (1917)
- Double Suicide (1918)
- Rigoletto (1918)
- So fallen die Lose des Lebens (1918)
- The Ancestress (1919)
- The Master of Life (1920)
- Let the Little Ones Come to Me (1920)
- Durch Wahrheit zum Narren (1920)
- Freut Euch des Lebens (1920)
- The Dancing Death (1920)
- The Voice of Conscience (1920)
- Der Leiermann (1920)
- Eva, The Sin (1920)
- Verschneit (1920)
- Doctor Ruhland (1920)
- Light of His Life (1921)
- The Woman in White (1921)
- The Films of Princess Fantoche (1921)
- The Story of a Maid (1921)
- Lady Hamilton (1921)
- Money in the Streets (1922)
- Lucrezia Borgia (1922)
- Explosion (1923)
- The Slipper Hero (1923)
- Southern Love (1924)
- The Island of Dreams (1925)
- Fire of Love (1925)
- I Love You (1925)
- The White Horse Inn (1926)
- The Brothers Schellenberg (1926)
- The Uncle from the Provinces (1926)
- The Son of Hannibal (1926)
- When I Came Back (1926)
- The White Slave (1927)
- The Dashing Archduke (1927)
- The Golden Abyss (1927)
- The Dollar Princess and her Six Admirers (1927)
- The Csardas Princess (1927)
- The Last Waltz (1927)
- The Women's War (1928)
- The Lady in Black (1928)
- Two Red Roses (1928)
- Vienna, City of My Dreams (1928)
- Spy of Madame Pompadour (1928)
- Ship in Distress (1929)
- Play Around a Man (1929)
- Schwarzwaldmädel (1929)
- The Great Longing (1930)
- The Song Is Ended (1930)
- Twice Married (1930)
- The Immortal Vagabond (1930)
- My Cousin from Warsaw (1931)
- The Emperor's Sweetheart (1931)
- Circus Life (1931)
- The Opera Ball (1931)
- The Men Around Lucy (1931)
- Grock (1931)
- I Do Not Want to Know Who You Are (1932)
- The Prince of Arcadia (1932)
- The Tsar's Diamond (1932)
- Madame Makes Her Exit (1932)
- Madame Wants No Children (1933)
- A Woman Like You (1933)
- Typhoon (1933)
- The Star of Valencia (1933)
- The Castle in the South (1933)
- Keine Angst vor Liebe (1933)
- Her Highness the Saleswoman (1933)
- Tell Me Who You Are (1933)
- Roman einer Nacht (1933)
- An Evening Visit (1934)
- At Blonde Kathrein's Place (1934)
- Die Fahrt in die Jugend (1935)
- Dance Music (1935)
- Whom the Gods Love (1936)
- Wer zuletzt küßt... (1936)
- Peter in the Snow (1937)
- Die unvollkommene Liebe (1940)
- Im Krug zum grünen Kranze, a.k.a. Die fünf Karnickel (1953)

== See also ==
- List of centenarians
