= Liddy Hegewald =

German film producer

- Born: 22 September 1884; Bockau, German Empire
- Died: 1 December 1950 (aged 66); Berlin, Germany
- Other name: Lydie Hegewald
- Occupation: Producer
- Years active: 1919-1931 (film)

Liddy Hegewald (1884–1950) was a German film producer of the silent and early sound eras. She controlled her own production company Hegewald Film.

== Selected filmography ==
- Raid (1921)
- The Marriage Swindler (1922)
- Fratricide (1922)
- People in Need (1925)
- The Priest from Kirchfeld (1926)
- The Orlov (1927)
- Flirtation (1927)
- The Prince's Child (1927)
- German Women - German Faithfulness (1927)
- Fair Game (1928)
- Tales from the Vienna Woods (1928)
- The Happy Vagabonds (1929)
- Crucified Girl (1929)
- His Majesty's Lieutenant (1929)
- The Tsarevich (1929)
- Spring Awakening (1929)
- The Citadel of Warsaw (1930)
- The Right to Love (1930)
- Oh Those Glorious Old Student Days (1930)
- A Girl from the Reeperbahn (1930)
- Pension Schöller (1930)
- Madame Bluebeard (1931)
- The Foreigner (1931)
- When the Soldiers (1931)
- The Stranger (1931)

== Bibliography ==
- Kester, Bernadette. Film Front Weimar: Representations of the First World War in German films of the Weimar Period (1919-1933). Amsterdam University Press, 2003. (At Google Books).
