= Anton Kolm =

Austrian film director

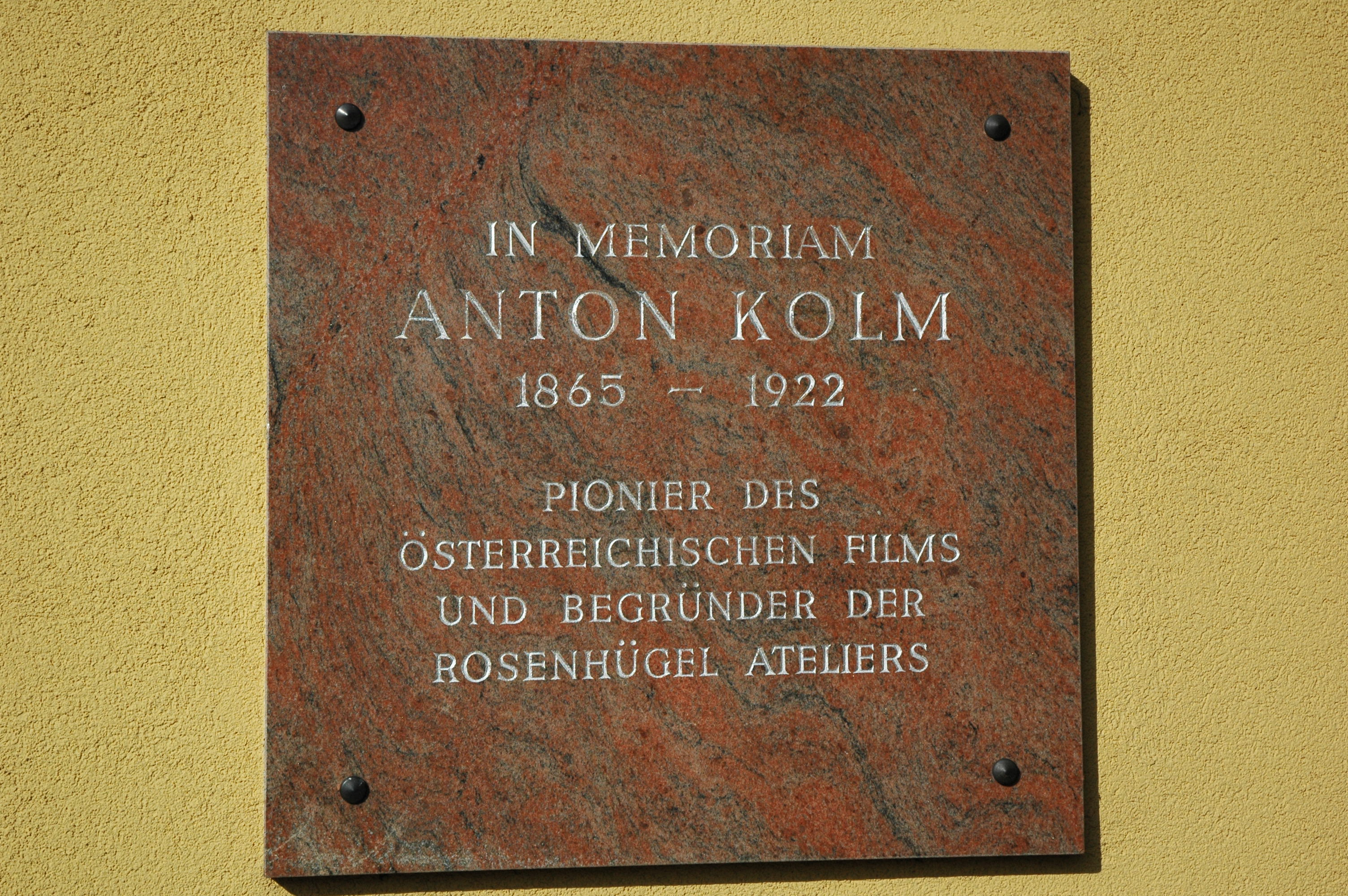
Memorial tablet to Anton Kolm by the entrance to the Rosenhügel Film Studios, founded by him as the Vita-Film-Ateliers

Anton Kolm (12 October 1865 in Vienna as Gustav Anton Kolm – 11 October 1922, also in Vienna) was an Austrian photographer who became one of the first film directors and film producers in the history of Austrian cinema.

A skilled photographer, he started to make short films privately from as early as 1906, but these were not intended for cinemas. On the basis of his preparatory work he founded in 1910, together with his wife, Luise Kolm, and Jacob Fleck, the Erste österreichische Kinofilms-Industrie, which at the end of the following year was renamed Wiener Kunstfilm-Industrie, and remained for a long time the leading film production company of Austro-Hungary. Kolm occupied himself principally with the finances and the direction of the business, and was only actively involved in a part of the firm's productions, while his wife, one of the earliest female film directors, was responsible for the creative work.

In 1919, with his wife and with financial support from the Depositenbank, he re-founded the Wiener Kunstfilm-Industrie as Vita-Film. Work immediately began on the construction of the Rosenhügel Film Studios, which were already in use before their completion in 1923. Vita-Film produced a number of films there, such as the epic Samson and Delilah (1922), but like many other European film-related businesses was forced into bankruptcy in 1924 by the flood of cheap American films, with which the European film industry was mostly unable to compete.

Anton Kolm however had disposed of his interest in the company in 1922, after disputes over financial matters. He died on 11 October 1922 and did not see the closure of Vita-Film. His wife Luise and his business partner Jacob Fleck moved to Berlin, where they married in1924.

Anton Kolm's son by Luise, Walter Kolm-Veltée, was also involved in the film industry, and among other things established a film academy at the University of Vienna.

== Filmography ==
Kolm also shot a great quantity of early newsreel footage now of great historical value.

- Von Stufe zu Stufe (1908) (producer)
- Die böse Schwiegermutter (1910) (director)
- Die Glückspuppe (1911) (director, together with Jacob Fleck, Luise Kolm and Claudius Veltée)
- Hoffmanns Erzählungen (1911) (director, together with Jacob Fleck, Luise Kolm and Claudius Veltée)
- Der Müller und sein Kind (1911/I) (producer)
- Der Müller und sein Kind (1911/II) (producer)
- Die Volkssänger (1911) (director)
- Karl Blasel als Zahnarzt (1912) (director)
- Trilby (1912) (director, together with Jacob Fleck, Luise Kolm and Claudius Veltée)
- The Wedding of Valeni (1914)
- With Heart and Hand for the Fatherland (1915) (producer)
- Summer Idyll (1916) (producer)
- On the Heights (1916) (producer)
- The Vagabonds (1916) (producer)
- With God for Emperor and Empire (1916) (producer)
- The Tragedy of Castle Rottersheim (1916) (producer)
- Lebenswogen (1917) (producer)
- The Black Hand (1917) (producer)
- In the Line of Duty (1917) (producer)
- The Stain of Shame (1917) (producer)
- Die Jüdin (1918) (producer)
- Double Suicide (1918) (producer)
- Rigoletto (1918) (producer)
- Die Zauberin am Stein (1919) (producer)
- The Ancestress (1919) (producer)
- Der Ledige Hof (1919) (producer)
- The Dancing Death (1920) (producer)
- Winterstürme (1920) (producer)
- Doctor Ruhland (1920) (producer)
- Eva, The Sin (1920) (producer)
- Let the Little Ones Come to Me (1920) (producer)
- The Master of Life (1920) (producer)
