= Jacob Fleck =

Austrian film director

Jacob and Luise Fleck c. 1937

Jacob Fleck (8 November 1881 in Vienna as Jacob Julius Fleck – 19 September 1953, also in Vienna) was an Austrian film director, screenwriter, film producer and cameraman. He is noted for his long-standing professional partnership with his wife Luise Fleck who co-directed his films with him.

== Biography ==
In 1910, together with Anton Kolm, Kolm's wife Luise (who later married Fleck), and her brother Claudius Veltée, Jacob Fleck established the film production company Erste Österreichische Kinofilms-Industrie in Wien-Alsergrund. The company changed its name only a year later to Wiener Kunstfilm-Industrie, in which Fleck worked partly as a cameraman, but principally as a producer and director together with Luise Kolm in making numerous films.

Anton Kolm died in 1922. In 1923 Fleck moved with Luise Kolm to Berlin, where they married in 1924: Luise was known from then on as Luise Fleck. Both of them worked for Hegewald-Film and UFA. In the 1920s they were known as the "director-couple" (Regieehepaar). In this period they produced between 30 and 40 films, but in 1933, after Hitler took power, they returned to Austria, as Jacob was Jewish.

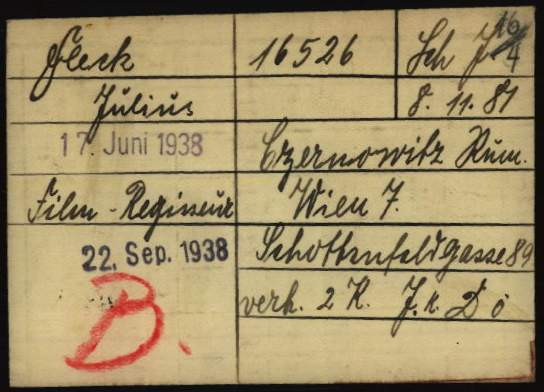
Registration card of Jacob Fleck as a prisoner at Dachau Nazi Concentration Camp

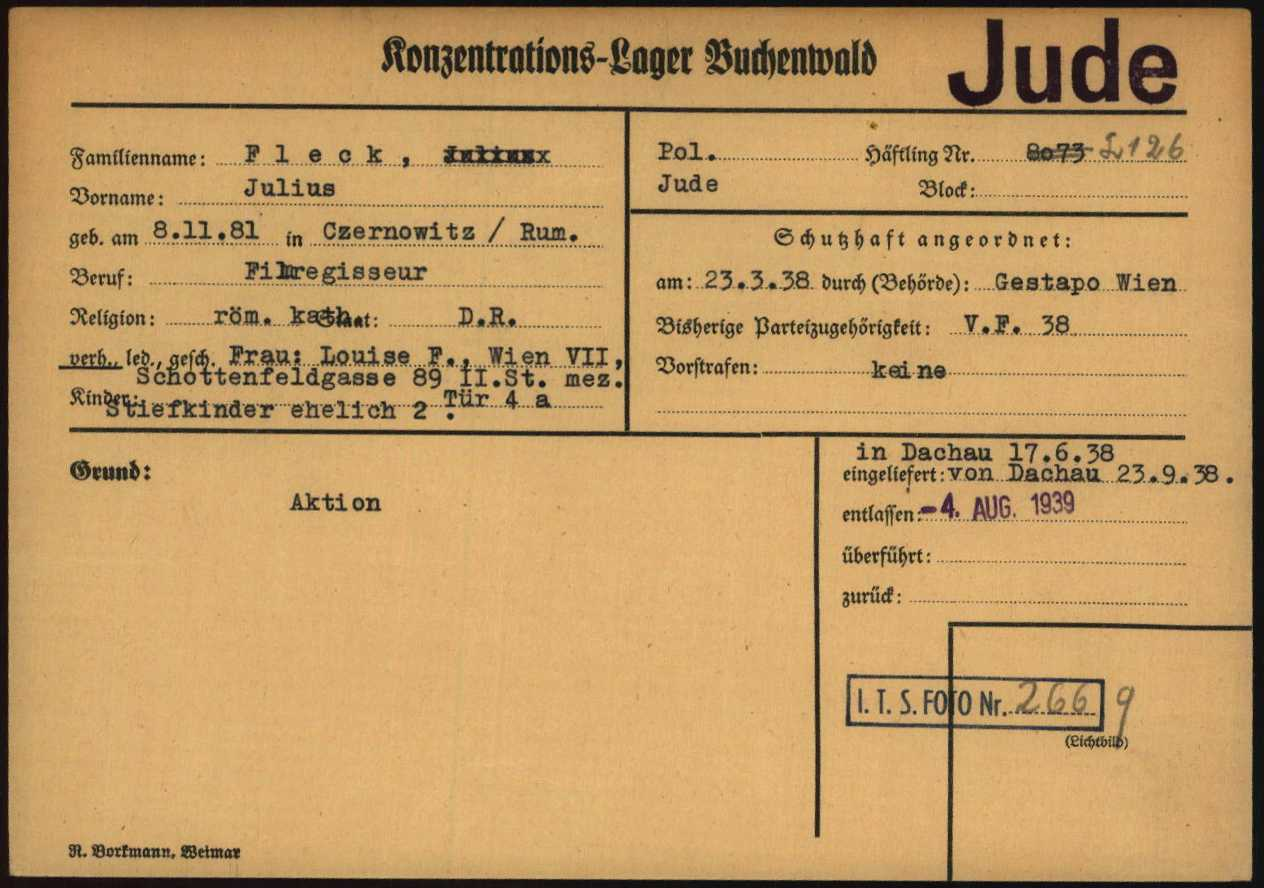
Registration card of Jacob Fleck as a prisoner at Buchenwald Nazi Concentration Camp

In 1938, as an effect of the Anschluss (the annexation of Austria to Germany), Jews were categorically excluded from the film industry. Fleck was obliged to earn his living as a photographer's re-toucher. In 1938 he was interned, at first in the concentration camp Buchenwald, then in Dachau, and then again in Buchenwald, for a total period of just over 16 months. In 1939/40, the Flecks emigrated to Shanghai. The Chinese director Fei Mu filmed with them as a co-production the film Söhne und Töchter der Welt ("Sons and Daughters of the World"). It was the only collaboration between Chinese and foreign film artists prior to the foundation of the People's Republic of China, and premiered on 4 October 1941 in the Yindu Theatre in Shanghai.

In 1947, the year of the opening of Austria's first post-war film studio - Belvedere Film, established by Emmerich Hanus and Elfi von Dassanowsky - the Flecks returned to Austria, in order to plan their comeback, which however never took off. Jacob Fleck died in 1953, three years after his wife.

== Selected filmography ==
=== As director ===
- 1910 - Die Ahnfrau (directorial debut)
- 1911 - Hoffmanns Erzählungen
- Die Glückspuppe (1911)
- 1912 - Trilby
- 1912 - Zweierlei Blut
- 1914 - Svengali
- The Wedding of Valeni (1914)
- The Priest from Kirchfeld (1914)
- 1915 - Der Traum des österreichischen Reservisten
- With Heart and Hand for the Fatherland (1915)
- 1915 - Der Meineidbauer
- With God for Emperor and Empire (1916)
- On the Heights (1916)
- Summer Idyll (1916)
- The Vagabonds (1916)
- The Tragedy of Castle Rottersheim (1916)
- The Black Hand (1917)
- The Spendthrift (1917)
- In the Line of Duty (1917)
- The Stain of Shame (1917)
- Lebenswogen (1917)
- Double Suicide (1918)
- Rigoletto (1918)
- Don Cesar, Count of Irun (1918)
- 1918 - Die Geißel der Menschheit
- 1918 - Die Jüdin
- 1919 - Lumpazivagabundus
- The Ancestress (1919) (for the second time; at more than 60 minutes, significantly longer than the first version)
- 1919 - Die Zauberin am Stein
- 1920 - Verschneit
- 1920 - Der Leiermann
- The Voice of Conscience (1920)
- Let the Little Ones Come to Me (1920)
- The Master of Life (1920)
- 1920 - Großstadtgift
- The Dancing Death (1920)
- Eva, The Sin (1920)
- Spring Awakening (1924)
- 1926 - Der Meineidbauer
- The Priest from Kirchfeld (1926)
- The Orlov (1927)
- The Prince's Child (1927)
- A Girl of the People (1927)
- Flirtation (1927)
- The Beggar Student (1927)
- The Merry Vineyard (1927)
- Doctor Schäfer (1928)
- The Beloved of His Highness (1928)
- Yacht of the Seven Sins (1928)
- The Little Slave (1928)
- The Most Beautiful Woman in Paris (1928)
- His Majesty's Lieutenant (1929)
- The Happy Vagabonds (1929)
- The Tsarevich (1929)
- Crucified Girl (1929)
- The Right to Love (1930)
- The Citadel of Warsaw (1930)
- When the Soldiers (1931)
- An Auto and No Money (1932)
- Our Emperor (1933)
- 1935 - Csardas
- The Priest from Kirchfeld (1937)
- 1941 - Söhne und Töchter der Welt

=== As producer ===
- Der Müller und sein Kind (1911)
- Die Zauberin am Stein (1919)
- - Winterstürme (1920)
- Doctor Ruhland (1920)
- Söhne und Töchter der Welt (1941, co-producer with Luise Fleck)

=== As screenwriter ===
- 1912 - Zweierlei Blut
- 1917 - Mir kommt keiner aus
- 1918 - Die Geisel der Menschheit
- 1920 - Eva, die Sünde
- 1924 - Frühlingserwachen
- 1941 - Söhne und Töchter der Welt
