= Wiener Kunstfilm =

Austrian film company

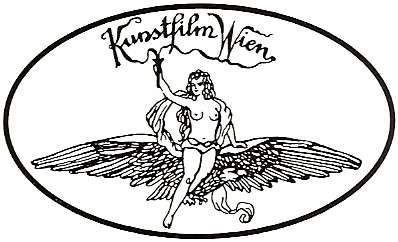
The trademark of Wiener Kunstfilm-Industrie

Wiener Kunstfilm, in full Wiener Kunstfilm-Industrie (English: "Vienna Art Film Industry"), was the first major Austrian film production company. Founded in 1910 as the Erste österreichische Kinofilms-Industrie, it was a pioneer in almost every field of silent film in Austria.

== History ==
Wiener Kunstfilm was founded in January 1910 (115 years ago) as the Erste österreichische Kinofilms-Industrie in Alsergrund in Vienna by the photographer Anton Kolm, his wife Luise née Veltée, daughter of the owner of a panopticon, and the cameraman Jacob Fleck.

Wiener Kunstfilm was established at a time when the Austro-Hungarian cinema market was almost totally dominated by French companies. In order to be able to resist these financially powerful international companies, Wiener Kunstfilm, in its role as the first Austrian film production company, needed, and received, the full support of patriotic media and cinema proprietors.

The company is distinguished as the first in Austria to produce a weekly newsreel; it also produced the first Austrian drama film, as well as achieving a number of other Austrian cinematic firsts. Due to its coverage of important events, Wiener Kunstfilm also has great significance as the chronicler of the last years of the Austro-Hungarian monarchy.

During World War I, although its former French rivals vanished from the picture, expelled from Austria as enemy aliens, Wiener Kunstfilm came under increasing pressure from the rival Austrian company Sascha-Film, backed by the immense family wealth of its proprietor, Count Sascha Kolowrat-Krakowsky, which by 1918 had secured dominance of the market. Wiener Kunstfilm was forced into liquidation in 1919 (106 years ago), although refounded by Anton and Luise Kolm as the short-lived Vita-Film.

== Co-workers ==
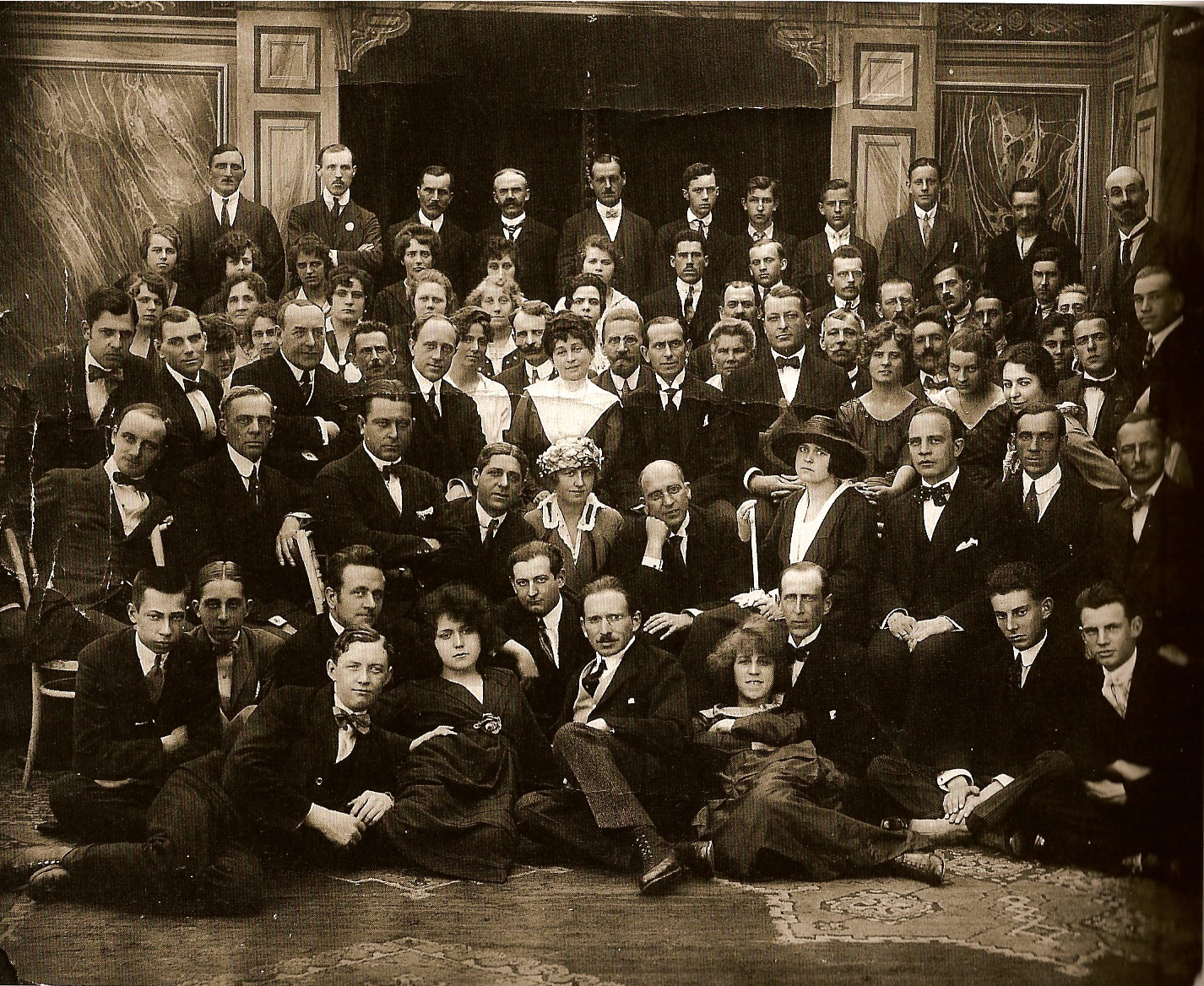
The permanent staff of Wiener Kunstfilm-Industrie, with Luise Kolm and Jacob Fleck in the middle; undated photograph

In the early years film direction was undertaken entirely by the founders themselves, Anton Kolm, Luise Kolm and Jacob Fleck, as well as Luise's brother Claudius Veltée, as a team. The first regular director outside this small family group was Marco Brociner. From 1913 Alfred Deutsch-German worked as the company screenwriter.

Other directors who worked occasionally for Wiener Kunstfilm were Walter Friedemann, Ludwig Ganghofer, Max Neufeld and Hans Otto Löwenstein.

== Studio ==
The studio of Wiener Kunstfilm was apparently located in Mauer (now part of Vienna, then a village just outside the city boundaries), according to contemporary advertisements, presumably on the same site as the still-extant Rosenhügel Film Studios, which were built by the successor company, Vita-Film.

== Productions ==
All productions of the period were silent and apart from major features were usually no more than 20 minutes in length, and this applied also to the productions of Wiener Kunstfilm. Several subjects were produced twice. The following list is a selection of their work, mostly dramas; only a very few of the enormous quantity of weekly news reels are noted.

- Der Faschingszug in Ober-St. Veit ("The Fasching Procession in Ober-St. Veit"; newsreel, 1910)
- Der Trauerzug Sr. Exzellenz des Bürgermeisters Dr. Karl Lueger ("The Funeral Procession of His Excellency the Mayor Dr. Karl Lueger"; newsreel, 1910)
- Die böse Schwiegermutter (1910)
- Die Ahnfrau (1910, 1919)
- Typen und Szenen aus dem Wiener Volksleben (documentary, 1911)
- Volkssänger (1911)
- Der Dorftrottel (1911)
- Die Glückspuppe (1911)
- Mutter - Tragödie eines Fabriksmädels (1911)
- Nur ein armer Knecht (1911)
- Martha mit dem Hosenrock (1911)
- Der Müller und sein Kind (1910, 1911; premiere 21 October 1911)
- Trilby (1912)
- Das Gänsehäufel (documentary, 1912)
- Karl Blasel als Zahnarzt (1912)
- Der Unbekannte (1912)
- Der Psychiater (second title Das Proletarierherz, 1913)
- Der Pfarrer von Kirchfeld (1913/1914; premiere 30 October 1914)
- Svengali (1914)
- Das vierte Gebot (1914)
- Der Meineidbauer (1915)

== Sources ==
- Francesco Bono, Paolo Caneppele, Günter Krenn (eds.): Elektrische Schatten, Verlag Filmarchiv Austria, Vienna 1999, ISBN 3-901932-02-X
- Walter Fritz: Im Kino erlebe ich die Welt: 100 Jahre Kino und Film in Österreich. Verlag Christian Brandstätter, Vienna 1997, ISBN 3-85447-661-2.
