= List of Italian films of 1925 =

A list of films produced in Italy in 1925 (see 1925 in film):

Title	Director	Cast	Genre	Notes
1925
La Bocca chiusa				
La Casa dello scandalo				
Catene				
Il cavaliere senza paura	Giuseppe de Liguoro			
Chiagno pe tte!...	Ubaldo Maria Del Colle			
The Fiery Cavalcade	Carmine Gallone	Soava Gallone, Emilio Ghione	Silent	
Fra Diavolo				
La freccia nel cuore	Amleto Palermi	Arnold Kent	Silent	
Maciste all'inferno	Guido Brignone	Bartolomeo Pagano, Elena Sangro	Adventure	
Marco Visconti	Aldo De Benedetti	Bruto Castellani, Amleto Novelli	Historical	
Mettete l'avocato	Elvira Notari		Silent	
New Moon	Armando Fizzarotti	Ubaldo Maria Del Colle	Silent	
Nostradamus	Mario Roncoroni	Cellio Bucchi	Historical	
Take Care of Amelia	Telemaco Ruggeri	Pina Menichelli, Elena Lunda	Comedy	
L'uomo più allegro di Vienna	Amleto Palermi	Ruggero Ruggeri, Victor Varconi, María Corda	Silent	
Voglio tradire mio marito	Mario Camerini	Oreste Bilancia, Luigi Serventi	Silent	

== See also ==
- List of Italian films of 1924
- List of Italian films of 1926
