= List of Italian films of 1926 =

A list of films produced in Italy in 1926 (see 1926 in film):

Title	Director	Cast	Genre	Notes
1926
Beatrice Cenci				
Bufera				
Il Cavalier Petagna				
The Last Days of Pompeii	Amleto Palermi, Carmine Gallone	Rina De Liguoro, Maria Korda, Victor Varkony, Bernhard Goetzke, Livia Maris	Sword and sandal	
The Last Lord	Augusto Genina	Carmen Boni, Oreste Bilancia	Comedy	
Maciste against the Sheik	Mario Camerini	Bartolomeo Pagano, Franz Sala	Adventure	
Maciste in the Lion's Cage	Guido Brignone	Bartolomeo Pagano, Elena Sangro	Adventure	

== See also ==
- List of Italian films of 1925
- List of Italian films of 1927
