= List of Italian films of 1927 =

A list of films produced in Italy in 1927 (see 1927 in film):

Title	Director	Cast	Genre	Notes
1927
I 28 giorni di Claretta				
L' Angelo ferito				
La bellezza del mondo	Mario Almirante	Vittorio De Sica		
The Courier of Moncenisio	Baldassarre Negroni	Bartolomeo Pagano, Rina De Liguoro	Historical	
The Giant of the Dolomites	Guido Brignone	Bartolomeo Pagano; Elena Lunda	Adventure	
Goodbye Youth	Augusto Genina	Elena Sangro; Carmen Boni	Drama	
O Marenariello				

== See also ==
- List of Italian films of 1926
- List of Italian films of 1928
