= List of Italian films of 1928 =

A list of films produced in Italy in 1928 (see 1928 in film):

Title	Director	Cast	Genre	Notes
1928
...nun è Carmela mia				
The Beautiful Corsair	Wladimiro De Liguoro	Rina De Liguoro, Bruto Castellani	Silent	
Boccaccesca				
Brigata Firenze				
The Carnival of Venice	Mario Almirante	Maria Jacobini, Malcolm Tod, Bonaventura Ibáñez	Drama	
Company and the Crazy	Mario Almirante	Vasco Creti, Vittorio De Sica	Comedy	
The Confessions of a Woman	Amleto Palermi	Augusto Bandini, Luigi Serventi	Drama	
The Golden Vein	Guglielmo Zorzi	Diana Karenne, Elio Steiner, Giovanni Cimara	Comedy	
Kif Tebbi	Mario Camerini	Gino Viotti, Piero Carnabuci	War	
Star of the Sea	Ubaldo Maria Del Colle	Goffredo D'Andrea, Gemma De Ferrari	Drama	
Villa Falconieri	Richard Oswald	Maria Jacobini, Hans Stüwe	Drama	Co-production with Germany

== See also ==
- List of Italian films of 1927
- List of Italian films of 1929
