= List of Italian films of 1929 =

A list of films produced in Italy in 1929 (see 1929 in film):

Title	Director	Cast	Genre	Notes
1929
Gli Amori di Casanova				
Diga di Maghmod				
Un Dramma a 16 anni				
Girls Do Not Joke	Alfred Lind	Leda Gloria, Maurizio D'Ancora, Giuseppe Pierozzi	Comedy	
Judith and Holofernes	Baldassarre Negroni	Bartolomeo Pagano, Jia Ruskaja	Historical	
Miryam	Enrico Guazzoni	Isa Pola, Carlo Gualandri, Aristide Garbini	Drama	
Rails	Mario Camerini	Käthe von Nagy, Maurizio D'Ancora	Drama	
The Storyteller of Venice	Retti Marsani	Hertha von Walther, Luigi Serventi	Comedy	
Sun	Alessandro Blasetti	Marcello Spada, Vasco Creti	Drama	

== See also ==
- List of Italian films of 1928
- List of Italian films of 1930
