= Yes, Mr Brown =

1933 film

Yes Mr Brown
- Directed by: Herbert Wilcox
- Written by: Douglas Furber
- Based on: stage musical Geschäft mit Amerika by Paul Franck and Ludwig Hirschfeld
- Produced by: Herbert Wilcox
- Starring: Jack Buchanan; Hartley Power; Elsie Randolph; Margot Grahame
- Production company: British & Dominions Film Corporation
- Distributed by: United Artists (US)
- Release date: January 1933 (London)
- Running time: 94 minutes
- Country: United Kingdom
- Language: English

Yes, Mr Brown is a 1933 British musical comedy film directed by Herbert Wilcox and starring Jack Buchanan, Hartley Power, Elsie Randolph and Margot Grahame. It was written by Douglas Furber based on the stage musical Geschäft mit Amerika' by Paul Franck and Ludwig Hirschfeld.

Yes, Mr. Brown is missing from the BFI National Archive, and is listed as one of the British Film Institute's "75 Most Wanted" lost films.

== Plot ==
According to KIne Weekly: "Nicholas Baumann, manager of a Viennese branch of an American manufacturing concern, sets out to impress his employer, Mr Brown, who is new to the city. He arranges a dinner party, but quarrels with his wife, Clary, over her dog, and she leaves their flat in a huff. He then induces his secretary, Anne Weber, to act in Clary's stead, and the complications, worked out in a night club, lead to good fun before Nicholas' explanations are accepted by Mr Brown, and he earns a coveted partnership."

== Cast ==
- Jack Buchanan as Nicholas Baumann
- Hartley Power as Mr Brown
- Elsie Randolph as Anne Weber
- Margot Grahame as Clary Baumann
- Vera Pearce as Franzi
- Clifford Heatherley as Carlos
- David Bane as head waiter
- Muriel George as cook

== Reception ==
Kine Weekly wrote: "Farcical comedy with music, elegantly presented and tuneful in its score. Although a trifle slow in action, the picture panders good humouredly to popular taste, and provides capital light diversion. A profitable booking through the untiring efforts and gay versatility of Jack Buchanan, whose wide popularity is of definite box office value"

According to the Idaho Falls Post Register, the film was "gay catchy...entertainment with plenty of light comedy".

Variety wrote: "'A generous production, directed in good taste, marred occasionally by defective lighting, but not enough to interfere with the fact that it is another successful British film."

== Other film versions ==
- A Bit of Love (March 1932, Germany, directed by Max Neufeld)
- Monsieur, Madame and Bibi (March 1932, France, directed by Max Neufeld and Jean Boyer)
- Two Happy Hearts (September 1932, Italy, directed by Baldassarre Negroni)
