= 1913 in film =

1913 was a particularly fruitful year for film as an art form, and is often cited one of the years in the decade which contributed to the medium the most, along with 1917. The year was one where filmmakers of several countries made great artistic advancements, producing notable pioneering masterpieces such as The Student of Prague (Stellan Rye), Suspense (Phillips Smalley and Lois Weber), Atlantis (August Blom), Raja Harischandra (D. G. Phalke), Juve contre Fantomas (Louis Feuillade), Quo Vadis? (Enrico Guazzoni), Ingeborg Holm (Victor Sjöström), The Mothering Heart (D. W. Griffith), Ma l’amor mio non muore! (Mario Caserini), L’enfant de Paris (Léonce Perret) and Twilight of a Woman's Soul (Yevgenii Bauer).

== Events ==
- January 1 – The British Board of Film Censors is established.
- April 21 – The first full-length Indian (and Marathi) feature film Raja Harishchandra (silent) has its première (public release May 3).
- May – Mary Pickford signs a contract with Adolph Zukor's Famous Players Film Company for $500 per week, becoming the company's first superstar.
- Jesse L. Lasky, Cecil B. DeMille, Samuel Goldwyn and Oscar Apfel founded Jesse L. Lasky Feature Play Company.
- November 24 - Traffic in Souls is an early example of the narrative style of Hollywood film.
- December 29 – Charlie Chaplin signs a contract with Mack Sennett to begin making films at Keystone Studios.
- December 29 – release of The Adventures of Kathlyn, the second American serial film and the first to feature cliffhanger endings that became popular with later serials.
- December 29 – production starts on Jesse L. Lasky Feature Play Company's The Squaw Man, the first full-length Hollywood feature film.
- D. W. Griffith ends his series of Biograph shorts, begun in 1908, and leaves the Biograph Company in New York City to make full-length motion pictures.
- Georges Méliès' career as a director comes to an end.
- Cines-Palast in Berlin opens as a cinema with Quo Vadis.
- Mitchell and Kenyon shoot their last known films in England.
- Roscoe "Fatty" Arbuckle signs for Mack Sennett at Keystone Studios and his early films for them feature the first known instances of pie thrown on film.

== Top-grossing films (U.S.) ==
Highest-grossing films of 1913
Rank	Title	Gross
1	Traffic in Souls	$981,000 (US)

== Notable films ==
Films produced in the United States unless stated otherwise

=== A ===
- The Adventures of Kathlyn (lost), film serial directed by Francis J. Grandon, starring Kathlyn Williams
- Antony and Cleopatra (Marc'Antonio e Cleopatra), directed by Enrico Guazzoni, based on the 17th-century play by William Shakespeare – (Italy)
- Atlantis, directed by August Blom, starring Olaf Fønss and Ida Orloff, based on the 1912 novel by Gerhart Hauptmann – (Denmark)

=== B ===
- The Bangville Police, directed by Henry Lehrman, starring Mabel Normand and the Keystone Cops
- Barney Oldfield's Race for a Life, directed by Mack Sennett, starring Mabel Normand, Ford Sterling, Barney Oldfield and the Keystone Cops
- The Battle at Elderbush Gulch, directed by D. W. Griffith, starring Mae Marsh and Lillian Gish

=== C ===
- Cinderella or the Glass Slipper (Cendrillon ou la Pantoufle merveilleuse), directed by Georges Méliès, based on the 1697 fairy tale by Charles Perrault – (France)

=== D ===
- David Copperfield, directed by Thomas Bentley, based on the 1850 novel by Charles Dickens – (GB)
- The Difficult Couple (Nànfū Nànqī) (lost), directed by Zhang Shichuan and Zheng Zhengqiu – (China)
- Dr. Jekyll and Mr. Hyde, directed by Herbert Brenon, starring King Baggot, based on the 1886 novella by Robert Louis Stevenson

=== E ===
- The Evidence of the Film, directed by Lawrence Marston and Edwin Thanhouser

=== F ===
- Fantômas (parts 1-3), film serial directed by Louis Feuillade, based on the true crime novels by Pierre Souvestre and Marcel Allain – (France)

=== G ===
- The Grasshopper and the Ant (Strekosa i muravei), directed by Ladislas Starevich, based on the fable by Aesop – (Russia)

=== H ===
- Hamlet, directed by Hay Plumb, starring Johnston Forbes-Robertson, based on the 17th-century play by William Shakespeare – (GB)
- Hinemoa (lost), directed by Gaston Méliès – (New Zealand)

=== I ===
- Ingeborg Holm, directed by Victor Sjöström – (Sweden)
- Ivanhoe, directed by Herbert Brenon, starring King Baggot, based on the 1819 novel by Walter Scott

=== L ===
- The Last Days of Pompeii (Gli ultimi giorni di Pompei), directed by Eleuterio Rodolfi – (Italy)
- Love Everlasting (Ma l'amor mio non muore), directed by Mario Caserini, starring Lyda Borelli – (Italy)

=== M ===
- The Mothering Heart, directed by D. W. Griffith, starring Lillian Gish

=== N ===
- The Night Before Christmas (Noch pered Rozhdestvom), directed by Ladislas Starevich, starring Ivan Mosjoukine – (Russia)

=== P ===
- The Pit and the Pendulum (incomplete), directed by Alice Guy-Blaché, based on the 1842 short story by Edgar Allan Poe

=== Q ===
- Quo Vadis, directed by Enrico Guazzoni, based on the 1896 novel by Henryk Sienkiewicz – (Italy)

=== R ===
- Raja Harishchandra, directed by Dadasaheb Phalke – (India)

=== S ===
- Scrooge, directed by Leedham Bantock, starring Seymour Hicks, based on the 1843 novella A Christmas Carol by Charles Dickens – (GB)
- The Student of Prague (Der Student von Prag), directed by Stellan Rye, starring Paul Wegener, based on the 1839 short story William Wilson by Edgar Allan Poe – (Germany)
- Suspense, directed by Lois Weber

=== T ===
- The Telephone Girl and the Lady, directed by D. W. Griffith, starring Mae Marsh
- Traffic in Souls, directed by George Loane Tucker
- Twilight of a Woman's Soul (Sumerki zhenskoy dushi), directed by Yevgeni Bauer – (Russia)

=== W ===
- The Werewolf (lost), directed by Henry MacRae

=== Z ===
- Zhuangzi Tests His Wife (Zhuangzi shi qi), directed by Li Beihai – (China)

== Short film series ==
- Broncho Billy Anderson (1910–1916)
- Harold Lloyd (1913–1921)

== Births ==
- January 2 – Anna Lee, actress (died 2004)
- January 6 – Loretta Young, actress (died 2000)
- January 15
  - Lloyd Bridges, actor (died 1998)
  - Patricia Farr, actress (died 1948)
- January 28 - Maurice Gosfield, American stage, film, radio and television actor (died 1964)
- January 29 – Victor Mature, actor (died 1999)
- February 8 – Betty Field, actress (died 1973)
- February 10 – Douglas Slocombe, cinematographer (died 2016)
- February 25
  - Jim Backus, actor (died 1989)
  - Gert Fröbe, actor (died 1988)
- March 2 – Marjorie Weaver, American actress (died 1994)
- March 3 - Harold J. Stone, American actor died (died 2005)
- March 4 – John Garfield, American actor (died 1952)
- March 15
  - Macdonald Carey, American actor (died 1994)
  - Rosita Contreras, Argentine actress (died 1962)
- March 18 – René Clément, French director (died 1996)
- April 16 – Les Tremayne, English-American actor (died 2003)
- May 6 – Stewart Granger, actor (died 1993)
- May 8
  - Sid James, actor and comedian (died 1976)
  - Charles Scorsese, American actor (died 1993)
- May 10 – Maria Dominiani, actress (died 1993)
- May 18 – Mary Howard de Liagre, actress (died 2009)
- May 25 - Benjamin Melniker, American producer (died 2018)
- May 26 – Peter Cushing, actor (died 1994)
- May 27
  - Willie Best, actor (died 1962)
  - Linden Travers, actress (died 2001)
- June 28 – Franz Antel, Austrian filmmaker (died 2007)
- July 4 – Barbara Weeks, American actress (died 2003)
- July 10 – Joan Marsh, American actress (died 2000)
- July 16 – Mirza Babayev, Azerbaijani actor and singer (died 2003)
- July 18
  - Marvin Miller, American actor (died 1985)
  - Red Skelton, American actor, comedian (died 1997)
- July 20 – Irma Córdoba, Argentine actress (died 2008)
- July 29 – Gale Page, American actress (died 1983)
- August 10 – Noah Beery Jr., actor (died 1994)
- August 11 – Paul Dupuis, actor (died 1976)
- August 13
  - Rita Johnson, actress (died 1965)
  - Felix Nelson, actor (died 1998)
- August 24 – Dorothy Comingore, actress (died 1971)
- September 3 – Alan Ladd, actor (died 1964)
- September 5 - Kathleen Burke, actress (died 1980
- September 6 – Julie Gibson, actress (died 2019)
- September 7 – Anthony Quayle, actor (died 1989)
- September 12 – Gerardo de Leon, Filipino director, actor, screenwriter, producer (died 1981)
- September 19 – Frances Farmer, actress (died 1970)
- September 27 - Margery Mason, British actress (died 2014)
- September 29
  - Trevor Howard, British actor (died 1988)
  - Stanley Kramer, producer, director (died 2001)
- September 30 – Bill Walsh, producer, writer (died 1975)
- October 7 – Evelyn Venable, American actress (died 1993)
- October 10 – Janis Carter, American actress (died 1994)
- October 17 – Robert Lowery, American actor (died 1971)
- October 22 – Tamara Desni, German-born British actress (died 2008)
- October 30 - Don Lusk, American animator (died 2018)
- November 2 – Burt Lancaster, American actor (died 1994)
- November 4 – Gig Young, actor (died 1978)
- November 5
  - Guy Green, cinematographer (died 2005)
  - Vivien Leigh, actress (died 1967)
  - John McGiver, actor (died 1975)
- November 13 – Alexander Scourby, American actor (died 1985)
- November 16 - Ellen Albertini Dow, American character actress (died 2015)
- November 20 – Judy Canova, actress (died 1983)
- November 24
  - Howard Duff, actor (died 1990)
  - Geraldine Fitzgerald, actress (died 2005)
- December 1 – Mary Martin, actress (died 1990)
- December 25 – Tony Martin, singer, actor (died 2012)

== Deaths ==
- February - Florence Barker, film actress (b. 1891)
- March 15 – John R. Cumpson, stage and film actor (b. 1866)
- June 2 – Eleanor Caines, silent film actress (b. 1880)
- August 3 – Joseph Graybill, actor with D.W. Griffith (b. 1887)

== Film debuts ==
- Luciano Albertini – Spartacus
- Wallace Beery – The Right of Way
- Gladys Brockwell – The Rattlesnake
- Robert Broderick – Arizona
- William Conklin – Arizona
- Nell Craig – The Battle of Shiloh
- Douglass Dumbrille – What 80 Million Women Want
- Aud Egede-Nissen – Stage Children
- Louise Fazenda – The Romance of the Utah Pioneers
- John Gottowt – The Student of Prague
- Charles E. Graham – Arizona
- Louise Huff – In the Bishop's Carriage
- Gail Kane – Arizona
- Lila Leslie – The Third Degree
- Murdock MacQuarrie – The Count of Monte Cristo
- Rosita Marstini – A Prisoner in the Harem
- Nance O'Neil – The Count of Monte Cristo
- Lyda Salmonova – Evinrude
- Bernard Siegel – The Third Degree
- Paul Wegener – The Student of Prague
- Margaret Yarde – A Cigarette-Maker's Romance
