= Two Happy Hearts =

1932 film

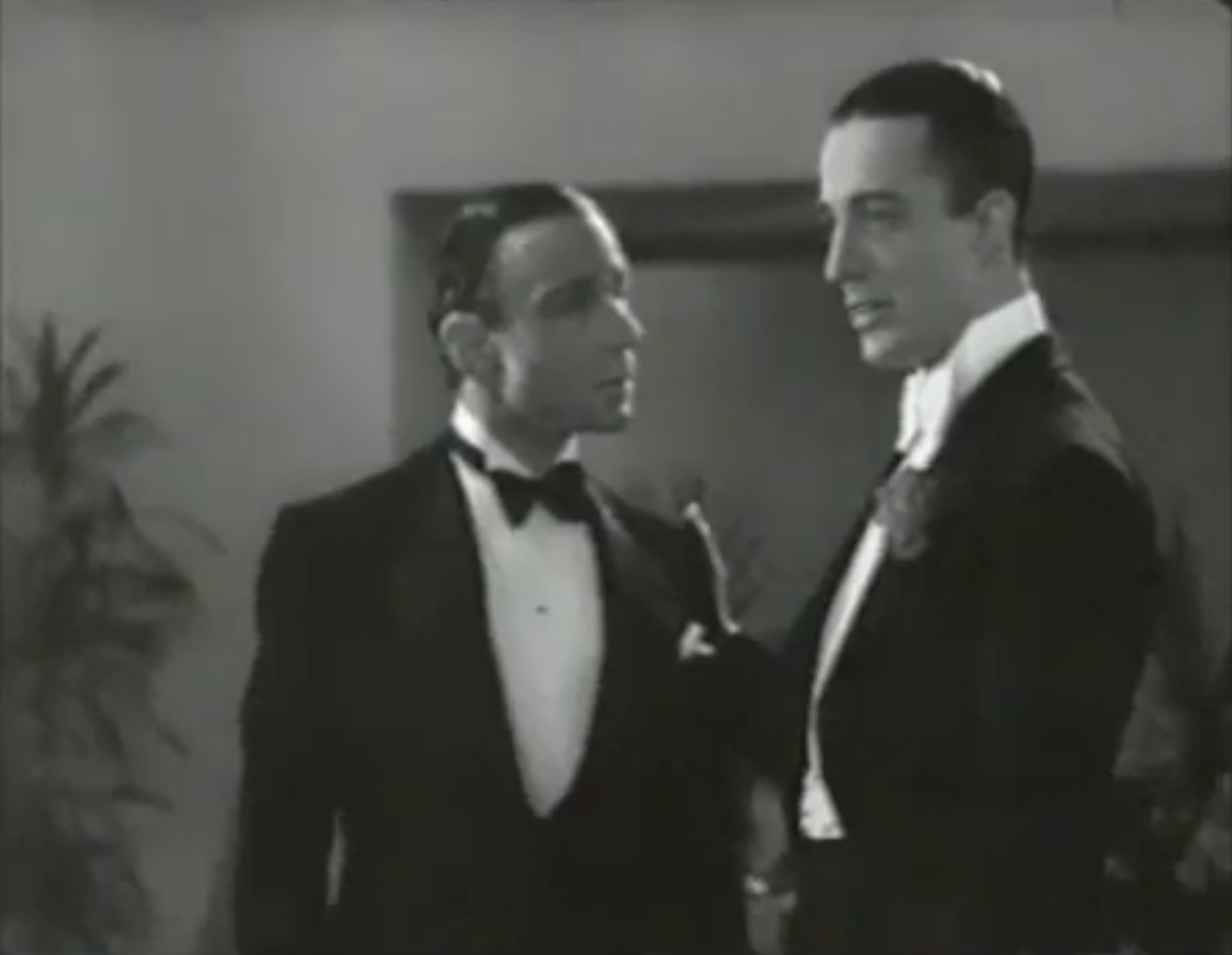
- Melnati and De Sica in a film scene
- Directed by: Baldassarre Negroni
- Written by: Raffaello Matarazzo; Aldo Vergano
- Starring: Vittorio De Sica
- Cinematography: Anchise Brizzi
- Edited by: Baldassarre Negroni
- Release date: 1932
- Running time: 78 minutes
- Country: Italy
- Language: Italian

Two Happy Hearts (Italian: Due cuori felici) is a 1932 Italian "white-telephones" comedy film directed by Baldassarre Negroni and starring Vittorio De Sica. It is known for its modernist set designs.

== Summary ==
A U.S. car representative's (Melnati) wife (Aylmer) stalks an American car mogul (De Sica) ahead of an important dinner meeting.

== Cast ==
- Rina Franchetti as Anna Rosi
- Mimì Aylmer as Clara Fabbri
- Vittorio De Sica as Mister Brown
- Umberto Melnati as Ing. Carlo Fabbri
- Loli Pilotto as La cameriera
- Giorgio Bianchi as Un amico di Fabbri
- Umberto Cocchi
- Gino Viotti

== Other film versions ==
- A Bit of Love (March 1932, Germany, directed by Max Neufeld)
- Monsieur, Madame and Bibi (March 1932, France, directed by Max Neufeld and Jean Boyer)
- Yes, Mr. Brown (January 1933, United Kingdom, directed by Herbert Wilcox)
