= The Second Mrs Tanqueray (disambiguation) =

The Second Mrs Tanqueray is a play.

The Second Mrs Tanqueray may also refer to:

- The Second Mrs Tanqueray (1916 film), a British film directed by Fred Paul
- The Second Mrs Tanqueray (1922 film), an Italian film directed Amleto Palermi
- The Second Mrs Tanqueray (1952 film), a British film directed by Dallas Bower
