= A Bit of Love =

1932 film directed by Max Neufeld

- Directed by: Max Neufeld
- Written by: Paul Franck (play); Ludwig Hirschfeld (play); Hans H. Zerlett; Max Neufeld
- Produced by: Herman Millakowsky
- Starring: Lee Parry; Magda Schneider; Hermann Thimig
- Cinematography: Willy Goldberger
- Edited by: Ladislao Vajda
- Music by: Paul Abraham; Helmut Wolfes
- Production company: H.M. Film
- Distributed by: Bavaria Film
- Release date: 3 March 1932
- Running time: 82 minutes
- Country: Germany
- Language: German

A Bit of Love (German: Ein bißchen Liebe für Dich) is a 1932 German comedy film directed by Max Neufeld and starring Lee Parry, Magda Schneider, and Hermann Thimig.

It was made at the Johannisthal Studios in Berlin. The film's art direction was by Ernö Metzner. A separate French-language film Monsieur, Madame and Bibi and an Italian Two Happy Hearts were also released.

== Cast ==
- Lee Parry as Clary, seine Gattin
- Magda Schneider as Anny, seine Sekretärin
- Hermann Thimig as Paul Baumann
- Georg Alexander as Mr. Brown, Fabrikant
- Rosy Barsony as Eine Revuetänzerin
- Olly Gebauer as Franzi, Kammerzofe
- Richard Alexander
- Edmund Pouch
- Charlotte Hasse
- Gustav Püttjer

== Other film versions ==
- Monsieur, Madame and Bibi (March 1932, France, directed by Max Neufeld and Jean Boyer)
- Two Happy Hearts (September 1932, Italy, directed by Baldassarre Negroni)
- Yes, Mr Brown (January 1933, UK, directed by Herbert Wilcox)

== Bibliography ==
- Bock, Hans-Michael; Bergfelder, Tim, eds. (2009). The Concise Cinegraph: Encyclopaedia of German Cinema. New York: Berghahn Books. ISBN 978-1-57181-655-9.
