= Ernst Arndt =

Ernst Arndt may refer to:

- Ernst Arndt (actor) (1861–1942), German/Austrian actor
- Ernst Moritz Arndt (1769–1860), German patriotic author
