= Cine34 =

Italian TV channel by Mediaset dedicated to Italian movies

- Country: Italy
- Broadcast area: Italy
- Headquarters: Cologno Monzese

Programming
- Language: Italian
- Picture format: HDTV 1080i

Ownership
- Owner: Mediaset
- Parent: Mediaset
- Key people: Marco Costa (director)
- Sister channels: Rete 4; Canale 5; Italia 1; 20; Iris; Real Time; La5; Focus; Top Crime; Boing; Cartoonito; Italia 2; Mediaset Extra

History
- Launched: 20 January 2020

Links
- Webcast: Mediaset Infinity
- Website: https://www.mediasetplay.mediaset.it/cine34

Availability

Terrestrial
- Digital terrestrial television: Channel 34

Cine34 is an Italian free-to-air channel by Mediaset and directed by Marco Costa. The channel mainly broadcasts Italian movies, especially classic.

It is available on channel 34 of digital terrestrial television and on satellite on Sky Italia and Tivùsat.

The official speaker is Mario Zucca.

== History ==
The channel began broadcasting on 20 January 2020 with a movie marathon of Federico Fellini, on occasion of his 100th birthday.

The channel's slogan is "Italia al Cinema" (Note: Translation: Italy at the Cinema.), so the channel's programming is related to Italian movies.

On 10 February 2020, after Lina Wertmüller received the Academy Honorary Award, the channel entirely broadcast the filmmaker's filmography with the title "Lina da Oscar".

On 15 April 2020, in occasion of Raimondo Vianello's 10th death anniversary, the channel entirely broadcast the actor's filmography with the title "Viva Raimondo!".

On 22 March 2021, in occasion of Nino Manfredi's 100th birthday, the channel entirely broadcast the actor's filmography with the title "Manfredi 100".

On 3 November 2021, in occasion of Monica Vitti's 90th birthday, the channel entirely broadcast the actress' filmography with the title "Vitti 90".

On 23 January 2023, following Gina Lollobrigida's death, the channel broadcast a TG5 special called "Indimenticabile Diva – Addio Lollo", to pay homage to the actress' death.

== Programming ==
The channel broadcasts Italian movies of various genres with two movies every evening.

- Mondays: I supercult (monographs)
- Tuesdays: Maestri del cinema (author)
- Wednesdays: Sfumature di giallo (Giallo)
- Thursdays: Non ci resta che ridere (Commedia all'italiana)
- Fridays: Le bellissime (Commedia sexy all'italiana) and Profondo erotico (erotic comedy)
- Saturdays: Lo chiamavano western (Spaghetti Western)
- Sundays: A mano armata (Poliziotteschi)

== See also ==
- Iris (TV channel)
