= Buffalo Bill in Rome =

1949 film

Buffalo Bill a Roma
- Italian: Buffalo Bill in Rome
- Directed by: Giuseppe Accattino
- Screenplay by: Giuseppe Accattino; Gian Bistolfi; Redo Romagnoli
- Story by: Giuseppe Accattino
- Produced by: Giuseppe Accattino
- Starring: Enzo Fiermonte; Elly Star; Ugo Sasso; Aldo Vasco; Silvio Bagolini; Rina De Liguoro; Antimo Reyner
- Cinematography: Ladislaus Szemte; Giovanni Vitrotti
- Edited by: Guy Simon
- Music by: Alfonso Salerno
- Production company: S.I.L.A.
- Release date: 1949
- Country: Italy
- Language: Italian

Buffalo Bill in Rome (Italian: Buffalo Bill a Roma) is a 1949 black-and-white Italian Western film directed by Giuseppe Accatino. It is set in 1905 with Buffalo Bill as the main character.

== Cast ==
- Aldo Vasco as Pietro
- Ugo Sasso as Red
- Elly Star as Maria
- Victor Wythe
- Silvio Bagolini
- Antimo Reyner
- Rina De Liguoro as Contessa Stefania
- Renzo Caetani
- Felice Minotti as Maria's Father
- Diana D'Altena as Lolita
- Attilio Torelli
- Alex Jordan
- Alfonso Di Stefano
- Ugo Urbino
- Franco Bill
- Enzo Fiermonte as Buffalo Bill
- Maria Laudi
- Walter Lang
