= The Portrait (1923 film) =

1923 film

- Directed by: Jacques Feyder
- Written by: Jules Romains
- Starring: Arlette Marchal; Malcolm Tod; Victor Vina
- Cinematography: Léonce-Henri Burel; Paul Parguel
- Production company: Vita-Film
- Release date: 3 October 1923
- Running time: 92 minutes
- Countries: Austria; France
- Languages: Silent; German intertitles

The Portrait (German: Das Bildnis, French: L'image) is a 1923 Austrian-French silent drama film directed by Jacques Feyder and starring Arlette Marchal, Malcolm Tod and Victor Vina. Future star Vilma Bánky appears in a small role.

It as shot at the Rosenhügel Studios in Vienna. The film's sets were designed by the art director Alexander Ferenczy.

== Cast ==
- Arlette Marchal as Madeleine Fontevrault "das Bildnis"
- Malcolm Tod as Ingenieur
- Jean-Victor Marguerite as Seminarist
- Victor Vina as Diamantenschleifer
- Fred Louis Lerch as Maler
- Armand Dufour as Madeleine's Ehemann
- Fred Hennings as Der Astronom
- Suzy Vernon as Freundin
- Mary Zaile as Die Kusine
- Vilma Bánky
- Eugen Jensen
- Ria Jászonyi
- Victor Kutschera

== Bibliography ==
- Robert Von Dassanowsky. Austrian Cinema: A History. McFarland, 2005.
