= Monsieur, Madame and Bibi =

1932 film directed by Jean Boyer and Max Neufeld

- Directed by: Jean Boyer; Max Neufeld
- Written by: Jean Boyer; Paul Franck; Ludwig Hirschfeld (play Geschäft mit Amerika); Hans H. Zerlett
- Produced by: Herman Millakowsky
- Starring: René Lefèvre; Marie Glory; Florelle
- Cinematography: Willy Goldberger
- Music by: Paul Abraham; Helmut Wolfes
- Production company: Pathé-Natan
- Distributed by: Pathé-Natan
- Release date: 12 March 1932
- Running time: 77 minutes
- Countries: France; Germany
- Language: French

Monsieur, Madame and Bibi (French: Monsieur, Madame et Bibi) is a 1932 French-German comedy film directed by Jean Boyer and Max Neufeld and starring René Lefèvre, Marie Glory and Florelle. It was the French-language version of the German film A Bit of Love, produced the same year and directed by Neufeld.

The film's art director was Ernő Metzner.

== Cast ==
- René Lefèvre as Monsieur Paul Baumann
- Marie Glory as Madame Clary Baumann
- Florelle as Anne Weber, secretary
- Jean Dax as Mr. Brown
- Suzanne Préville as Maid

== Other film versions ==
- A Bit of Love (March 1932, Germany, directed by Max Neufeld)
- Two Happy Hearts (September 1932, Italy, directed by Baldassarre Negroni)
- Yes, Mr Brown (January 1933, UK, directed by Herbert Wilcox)

== Bibliography ==
- Crisp, Colin. Genre, Myth and Convention in the French Cinema, 1929–1939. Indiana University Press, 2002.
