= Light of His Life =

1921 film

- Directed by: Max Neufeld
- Written by: Fritz Löhner-Beda
- Starring: Liane Haid; Eugen Neufeld; Karl Ehmann
- Production company: Vita-Film
- Release date: 28 January 1921
- Country: Austria
- Languages: Silent; German intertitles

Light of His Life (German: Sein Lebenslicht) is a 1921 Austrian silent film directed by Max Neufeld and starring Liane Haid, Eugen Neufeld and Karl Ehmann.

== Cast ==
- Liane Haid
- Eugen Neufeld
- Karl Ehmann
- Eduard Sekler
- Josef Recht

== Bibliography ==
- Parish, Robert. Film Actors Guide. Scarecrow Press, 1977.
