= Julius Caesar (1914 film) =

- Directed by: Enrico Guazzoni
- Written by: Raffaele Giovagnoli
- Based on: Julius Caesar; 1599 play by William Shakespeare
- Produced by: Enrico Guazzoni
- Starring: Amleto Novelli; Bruto Castellani; Pina Menichelli
- Production company: Società Italiana Cines
- Distributed by: Società Italiana Cines
- Release date: November 1914
- Running time: 112 minutes
- Country: Italy
- Languages: Silent; Italian intertitles

Julius Caesar (Italian: Giulio Cesare) is a 1914 Italian silent historical film directed by Enrico Guazzoni and starring Amleto Novelli, Bruto Castellani and Pina Menichelli. Taking minor inspiration from William Shakespeare's 1599 play of the same title, the film portrays the events leading up to the assassination of Julius Caesar. In the wake of Guazzoni's internationally successful Quo Vadis it was produced on an epic scale, including vast sets recreating Ancient Rome and more than 20,000 extras.

== Production and Direction ==
Enrico Guazzoni, a pioneer in early Italian cinema, directed the film. Guazzoni was known for his elaborate historical epics, such as Quo Vadis (1913). His work on Julius Caesar reflects a similar commitment to grandiose sets, historical authenticity, and a focus on dramatic storytelling.

The production utilized large-scale sets to recreate Ancient Rome, emphasizing grandeur and authenticity. The film's visual style was likely influenced by the artistic conventions of Italian cinema at the time, characterized by static camera angles, theatrical acting, and ornate costumes.

== Cast ==
- Amleto Novelli as Julius Caesar
- Bruto Castellani
- Irene Mattalia as Servilia
- Ignazio Lupi
- Augusto Mastripietri
- Antonio Nazzari as Brutus
- Gianna Terribili-Gonzales
- Lia Orlandini
- Ruffo Geri
- Pina Menichelli
- Orlando Ricci

== Bibliography ==
- Moliterno, Gino (2009). The A to Z of Italian Cinema. Lanham, Maryland: Scarecrow Press. ISBN 978-0810870598.
