= Beatrice Cenci (1926 film) =

1926 film

- Directed by: Baldassarre Negroni
- Written by: Luciano Doria; Torello Rolli
- Starring: Maria Jacobini; Raimondo Van Riel; Franz Sala
- Cinematography: Ubaldo Arata; Anchise Brizzi
- Production company: Societa Anonima Stefano Pittaluga
- Distributed by: Societa Anonima Stefano Pittaluga
- Release date: December 1926
- Country: Italy
- Languages: Silent; Italian intertitles

Beatrice Cenci is a 1926 Italian silent historical film directed by Baldassarre Negroni and starring Maria Jacobini, Raimondo Van Riel and Franz Sala. It is one of several films portraying the story of the sixteenth century Italian noblewoman Beatrice Cenci.

== Cast ==
- Maria Jacobini as Beatrice Cenci
- Raimondo Van Riel as Francesco Cenci
- Franz Sala as Marzio Savelli
- Gino Talamo as Olimpio Calvetti
- Ugo Gracci as il Catalano
- Cellio Bucchi as Amerigo Caponi
- Gemma De Sanctis as Lucrezia Petroni
- Camillo De Rossi as Marco Sciarra
- María De Valencia as Dianora Apolloni
- Lillian Lyl as Bernardo Cenci
- Augusto Bandini
- Ida Marus
- Nino Beltrame
- Tranquillo Bianchi
- Felice Minotti

== Bibliography ==
- Waters, Sandra. Narrating the Italian Historical Novel. ProQuest, 2009.
