= La canzone del sole =

La canzone del sole (Italian for 'The Song of the Sun' / 'The Sun Song') may refer to:

- La canzone del sole (film), a 1933 film by Max Neufeld, known in English as The Song of the Sun
- "La canzone del sole" (song), a 1971 song by Lucio Battisti
