= Emperor Maciste =

1924 film

- Directed by: Guido Brignone
- Written by: Pier Angelo Mazzolotti
- Starring: Bartolomeo Pagano; Domenico Gambino; Franz Sala
- Cinematography: Massimo Terzano
- Production company: Fert Film
- Distributed by: Societa Anonima Stefano Pittaluga
- Release date: November 1924
- Running time: 70 minutes
- Country: Italy
- Languages: Silent; Italian intertitles

Emperor Maciste (Italian: Maciste imperatore) is a 1924 Italian silent adventure film directed by Guido Brignone and starring Bartolomeo Pagano, Domenico Gambino and Franz Sala. It was part of the peplum series of silent films featuring the strongman Maciste. The character of Maciste increasingly came to resemble Benito Mussolini, in this case striking Fascistic poses and defending order against criminal and dishonest elements.

== Cast ==
- Bartolomeo Pagano as Maciste
- Domenico Gambino as Saetta
- Franz Sala
- Elena Sangro
- Oreste Grandi
- Augusto Bandini
- Lola Romanos
- Gero Zambuto
- Felice Minotti
- Armand Pouget
- Lorenzo Soderini

== Bibliography ==
- Gundle, Stephen. Mussolini's Dream Factory: Film Stardom in Fascist Italy. Berghahn Books, 2013.
- Moliterno, Gino. Historical Dictionary of Italian Cinema. Scarecrow Press, 2008.
- Ricci, Steven. Cinema and Fascism: Italian Film and Society, 1922–1943. University of California Press, 2008.
