= Iris (TV channel) =

Italian TV channel

IRIS
- Country: Italy
- Broadcast area: Italy; Switzerland

Programming
- Languages: Italian; English
- Picture format: 1080i HDTV

Ownership
- Owner: Mediaset Italia (MFE - MediaForEurope)
- Sister channels: Rete 4 Canale 5 Italia 1; 20; 27 Twentyseven; La5; Cine 34; Focus; Top Crime; Boing; Boing Plus; Cartoonito; Italia 2 TGcom24; Mediaset Extra

History
- Launched: 30 November 2007

Links
- Website: Iris

Availability

Terrestrial
- Digital terrestrial television: Channel 22

Streaming media
- Mediaset Infinity: Iris HD

Iris is an Italian free entertainment television channel, launched on 30 November 2007, operated by Mediaset and owned by MFE - MediaForEurope. It is broadcast in Italy on DTT channel 22 on mux Mediaset 4.

Iris broadcasts films (mainly author films), cult TV series, and small productions Mediaset, respecting the target network. It is available on digital terrestrial television and digital satellite television through Tivù Sat.

Iris started broadcasting in HD on satellite on 14 July 2022, on 15 November on TIMvision, on 21 December following the digital terrestrial, and on 17 June 2023 also on Mediaset Infinity.
