= List of Italian films of 1913 =

A list of films produced in Italy in 1913 (see 1913 in film):

| Title | Director | Cast | Genre | Notes |
|---|---|---|---|---|
1913
| A sipario calato | | | | |
| The Absent-Minded Lover | | | | |
| Gli Accattoni del Sacro Cuore | | | | |
| Acquazzone in montagna | | | | |
| Love Everlasting | Mario Caserini | Lyda Borelli, Mario Bonnard | Melodrama | |
| Quo vadis | Enrico Guazzoni | Amleto Novelli, Gustavo Serena, Lea Giunchi, Amelia Cattaneo, Bruto Castellani, Augusto Mastripietri | Sword and sandal | Silent Kolossal |
| Gli ultimi giorni di Pompei | Enrico Vidali | Luigi Mele, Suzanne De Labroy | Sword and sandal | in 1913 there were filmed 3 versions of the film in Italy. The other two were directed by Mario Caserini and Arturo Ambrosio. The most famous and international known is Vidali's version |
| Il bacio di Cirano | Carmine Gallone | | | Gallone's directorial debut |
| Il sire di Vincigliata | Alfredo Robert | | | |
