= Lia Orlandini =

Italian film and voice actress

- Born: 12 January 1896; Milan, Lombardy, Italy
- Died: 9 April 1975 (aged 79); Bologna, Emilia-Romagna, Italy
- Occupation: Actress
- Years active: 1911–1969 (film)

Lia Orlandini (January 12, 1896 – April 9, 1975) was an Italian film actress. She was also a voice actor, dubbing foreign films for release in Italy.

== Selected filmography ==
- Quo Vadis (1913)
- Julius Caesar (1914)
- Unjustified Absence (1939)
- The Night of Tricks (1939)
- Backstage (1939)
- Then We'll Get a Divorce (1940)
- Love Trap (1940)
- Abandonment (1940)
- Headlights in the Fog (1942)
- Two Hearts Among the Beasts (1943)
- Anything for a Song (1943)
- Deceit (1952)
- Letter from Naples (1954)

== Bibliography ==
- Piero Pruzzo & Enrico Lancia. Amedeo Nazzari. Gremese Editore, 1983.
