= Maciste in the Lion's Cage =

1926 film

- Directed by: Guido Brignone
- Written by: Guido Brignone
- Starring: Bartolomeo Pagano; Elena Sangro; Luigi Serventi
- Cinematography: Anchise Brizzi; Massimo Terzano
- Production company: Cinès-Pittaluga
- Release date: 10 February 1926
- Country: Italy
- Language: Silent (Italian intertitles)

Maciste in the Lion's Cage (Italian: Maciste nella gabbia dei leoni), also known as The Hero of the Circus, is a 1926 Italian silent adventure film directed by Guido Brignone and starring Bartolomeo Pagano, Elena Sangro, and Luigi Serventi. It was part of the popular Maciste series of films. It was the penultimate film of the silent series, followed by The Giant of the Dolomites (1927).

== Plot ==
As described in a film magazine, the big Pommer Circus is enjoying a successful run in a special theatre in Rome. Karl Pommer, the owner, has a breakdown and goes on a vacation. His son, George, a weakling in love with Sarah, the equestrienne star of the show, allows himself to be hoodwinked by the woman, so that William Strasser, her secret lover, is installed as manager. Under the new regime the circus rapidly deteriorates. Maciste, strong man and lion-tamer extraordinary, returns from a successful lion hunting expedition in Africa, with many fine specimens, and with Eda, a beautiful orphan of a famous explorer, who has been raised in savagery. Maciste quickly re-establishes the morale of the circus, is instrumental in Pommer’s return, and tries to break up George’s affair with Sarah. He makes a mortal enemy of the equestrienne and her accomplice, and has to beat up, in a spectacular physical combat, Sullivan, a towering bully and henchman of Strasser, who persists in bothering Eda. George has a definite break with his father on the eve of a changing program. It is to be the debut of Eda in her lion act. The opening night arrives, with society filling the gilded stalls and opera chairs. In the midst of Eda’s act, Sullivan, out of revenge, opens the cage of an untamable lion, the infuriated animal escapes into the audience, causing the greatest panic and catastrophe ever witnessed. Hundreds are trampled upon. Eda’s superb courage enables her to keep the other lions in check, while Maciste grapples with the devastating beast in the auditorium. The lion finally is captured. As the wreckage is being cleared up and the wounded taken away, George finally learns of his sweetheart’s perfidity and battles to victory with Strasser. Eda finds calm and solace at last in Maciste’s arms.

== Cast ==
- Bartolomeo Pagano as Maciste
- Elena Sangro as Sarah, la cavallerizza
- Luigi Serventi as Strasser
- Mimi Dovia as Seida / Eda
- Umberto Guarracino as Sullivan
- Oreste Grandi as Karl Pommer
- Alberto Collo as Giorgio Pommer / George
- Giuseppe Brignone as Bob, il vecchio clown
- Andrea Habay
- Vittorio Bianchi
- Augusto Bandini
- Franz Sala

== Bibliography ==
- Brunetta, Gian Piero. The History of Italian Cinema: A Guide to Italian Film from Its Origins to the Twenty-first Century. Princeton University Press, 2009.
- Moliterno, Gino. Historical Dictionary of Italian Cinema. Scarecrow Press, 2008.
- Ricci, Steven. Cinema and Fascism: Italian Film and Society, 1922–1943. University of California Press, 2008.
