= La signorina Ciclone =

- Directed by: Augusto Genina
- Cinematography: Carlo Montuori
- Release date: 1916
- Country: Italy
- Language: Silent

La signorina Ciclone is a 1916 Italian film directed by Augusto Genina. It was produced for Medusa Film.

== Cast ==
- Francesco Cacace as Claudio Barsac
- Carlo Cattaneo
- Suzanne d'Armelle
- Signora Romani
- Franz Sala
- Paolo Wullmann as Aly
