= Lucciola (film) =

- Directed by: Augusto Genina
- Written by: Fausto Maria Martini
- Starring: Fernanda Negri-Pouget
- Release date: 1917
- Running time: 82 minutes
- Country: Italy
- Language: Silent

Lucciola is a 1917 Italian silent drama film directed by Augusto Genina from a story by Fausto Maria Martini. It was one of the most successful Italian films of 1917.

== Plot ==
Lucciola is a young, poor, and carefree girl who lives in Genoa harbor, remaining pure despite the squalor around her. A painter takes notice of her and elevates her to a woman of society, surrounded by adorers, where she experiences her first love.

== Reception ==
The film was a resounding success, and was re-released in Italy at the start of the 1923–24 film season. Critic Vice-Vidal in La Rivista cinematografica wrote that Lucciola "features keen psychological insights, affinities and contrasts, shifting moods, and subtle undertones that render it all the more evocative and appealing," and that Genina, in making it, had demonstrated "skillfull and polished technique". Film director and historian Mariann Lewinsky, introducing the movie at the Cinema Ritrovato film festival in 2017, said "There are legions of films based on the story of a street girl who finds herself catapulted into the world of high society. Lucciola is among the best."

== Cast ==
- Oreste Bilancia
- Francesco Cacace
- Emilia Giorgi
- Helena Makowska
- Fernanda Negri-Pouget
- Enrico Roma
- Franz Sala
- Mario Salo
- Umberto Scalpellini
- Nella Tessieri-Frediani
- Paolo Wullmann
