= Vita-Film =

Defunct Austrian film production company

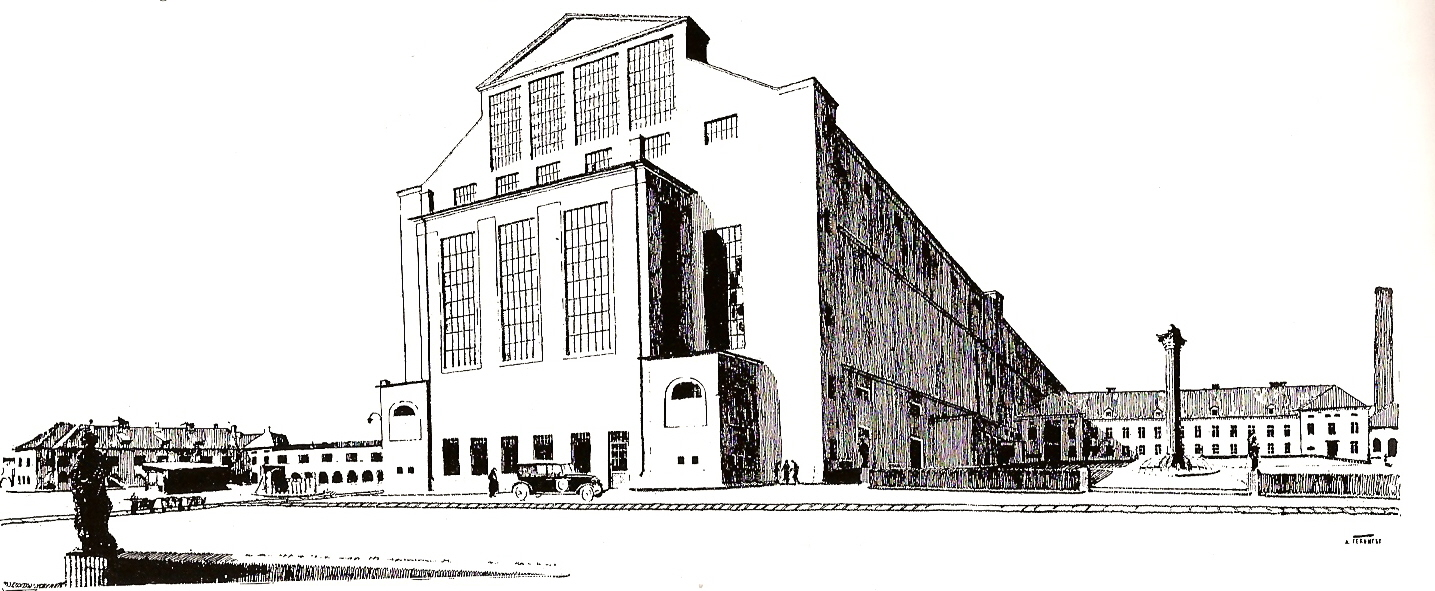
The Vita-Film studios at Rosenhügel, Vienna, completed in 1923, for many years Austria's largest and most modern film studios

Vita-Film was an Austrian film production company founded in 1919 as the successor company to Wiener Kunstfilm-Industrie by Anton and Luise Kolm.

By 1923 Vita-Film had built the Rosenhügel Film Studios in the Vienna suburbs, which still stand and are still used for film production. On the surrounding site, in 1922, even before the completion of the studios, the film Samson und Delila was produced, an epic on the then very popular American model. With extravagant sets and costumes, as generally used by Vita-Film's direct competitor, Sascha-Film, the production lasted a considerable time and cost 12 million Austrian crowns.

Samson und Delila was not however a typical Vita-Film production. Unlike Sascha-Film, which took its lead from American productions, Vita-Film sought international success by following French models. In 1923 directors employed on specific projects included Germaine Dulac (Die sterbende Sonne, 1923), Jean Legrand (Das Haus im Walde, 1923), Severin Mars (Horoga, 1923), M. Liabel (Die Insel ohne Liebe, 1923) and Edouard-Emile Violet (Clown aus Liebe, 1923). The Belgian director and one of the earliest realists, Jacques Feyder, filmed Das Bildnis in 1924 in Rosenhügel and Hungary, based on a screenplay by the well-known author Jules Romains. The film, the last Vita-Film production, was released in 1925.

The company went bankrupt in 1924, like many other European film companies at this time, because of the flood of low-priced but technically high-quality productions from the United States. The Rosenhügel studios were taken over in 1933 by Sascha-Film. A Hungarian lawyer, Erno Szucs, was appointed administrator to supervise the winding up of the company.

== Productions ==
- 1922 - Samson und Delila
- 1922 - Eine versunkene Welt
- 1923 - The Tales of Hoffmann (directed by Max Neufeld; premiere on 6 April 1923 at the Schwarzenberg Cinema)
- 1925 - Das Bildnis (L'Image) (direction by Jacques Feyder; last Vita-Film production at Rosenhügel)
