= The Tales of Hoffmann (1923 film) =

1923 film directed by Max Neufeld

- Directed by: Max Neufeld
- Written by: Jules Barbier (libretto); E.T.A. Hoffmann (stories); Josef B. Malina
- Produced by: Max Neufeld
- Starring: Max Neufeld; Karl Ehmann; Eugen Neufeld
- Cinematography: József Bécsi; Gaston Grincault
- Production company: Vita-Film
- Release date: 6 April 1923
- Running time: 98 minutes
- Country: Austria
- Languages: Silent; German intertitles

The Tales of Hoffmann (German: Hoffmanns Erzählungen) is a 1923 Austrian silent film directed by and starring Max Neufeld. The film also features Karl Ehmann, Eugen Neufeld and Robert Valberg.

== Cast ==
- Max Neufeld as E. T. A. Hoffmann
- Kitty Hulsch as Olympia
- Josef Zetenius as Narr
- Karl Ehmann as Puppenhändler
- Viktor Franz as Trödler
- Karl Forest as Rat Crespel
- Paul Askonas as Dr. Mirakel
- Lola Urban-Kneidinger as Antonia
- Eugen Neufeld as Dapertuto
- Robert Valberg as Schlemihl
- Friedrich Feher
- Dagny Servaes
- Hans Moser

== Bibliography ==
- Robert von Dassanowsky. Austrian Cinema: A History. McFarland, 2005.
