= Maciste on Vacation =

1921 film

- Directed by: Luigi Romano Borgnetto
- Written by: Alessandro De Stefani; Luigi Romano Borgnetto
- Starring: Bartolomeo Pagano; Henriette Bonard; Gemma De Sanctis
- Production company: Itala Film
- Distributed by: Unione Cinematografica Italiana
- Release date: May 1921
- Running time: 70 minutes
- Country: Italy
- Languages: Silent; Italian intertitles

Maciste on Vacation (Italian: Maciste in vacanza) is a 1921 Italian silent adventure film directed by Luigi Romano Borgnetto and starring Bartolomeo Pagano, Henriette Bonard and Gemma De Sanctis. It is part of the series of Maciste films.

== Cast ==
- Bartolomeo Pagano as Maciste
- Henriette Bonard as Elisa Guappana
- Gemma De Sanctis as la nonna
- Mario Voller-Buzzi as conte Baiardi
- Felice Minotti as Fernando Perez
- Guido De Rege as Dasti, il poeta
- Emilio Vardannes

== Bibliography ==
- Roy Kinnard & Tony Crnkovich. Italian Sword and Sandal Films, 1908–1990. McFarland, 2017.
