= Herman Millakowsky =

German film producer

- Born: 27 July 1892; Memel, East Prussia, German Empire
- Died: 12 February 1987 (aged 94); Beverly Hills, California, United States
- Occupation: Producer
- Years active: 1926–1954 (film)

Herman Millakowsky (27 July 1892 – 12 February 1987) was a German film producer. He studied history of art and philosophy at the University of Berlin. Following the Nazi rise to power he emigrated to Paris, where he worked in the French film industry. He later settled in the United States.

== Selected filmography ==
- The Circus of Life (1926)
- The Girl on a Swing (1926)
- Our Daily Bread (1926)
- Grandstand for General Staff (1926)
- Potsdam (1927)
- The President (1928)
- The Secret Courier (1928)
- The Adjutant of the Czar (1929)
- The King of Paris (1930)
- There Is a Woman Who Never Forgets You (1930)
- Two Worlds (1930)
- Love and Champagne (1930)
- Eight Days of Happiness (1931)
- The Love Express (1931)
- The Typist (1931)
- The Private Secretary (1931)
- The Opera Ball (1931)
- A Night at the Grand Hotel (1931)
- A Bit of Love (1932)
- Gypsies of the Night (1932)
- Overnight Sensation (1932)
- Monsieur, Madame and Bibi (1932)
- Liebelei (1933)
- Les yeux noirs (1935)
- Antonia (1935)
- 27 Rue de la Paix (1936)
- The Volga Boatman (1936)
- Yoshiwara (1937)
- The Postmaster's Daughter (1938)
- Ultimatum (1938)
- Immediate Call (1939)
- Women in Bondage (1943)
- Faces in the Fog (1944)
- Girls of the Big House (1945)
- Murder in the Music Hall (1946)
- Fear (1954)

== Bibliography ==
- Lutz Bacher. Max Ophuls in the Hollywood Studios. Rutgers University Press, 1996.
