= Quo Vadis (1913 film) =

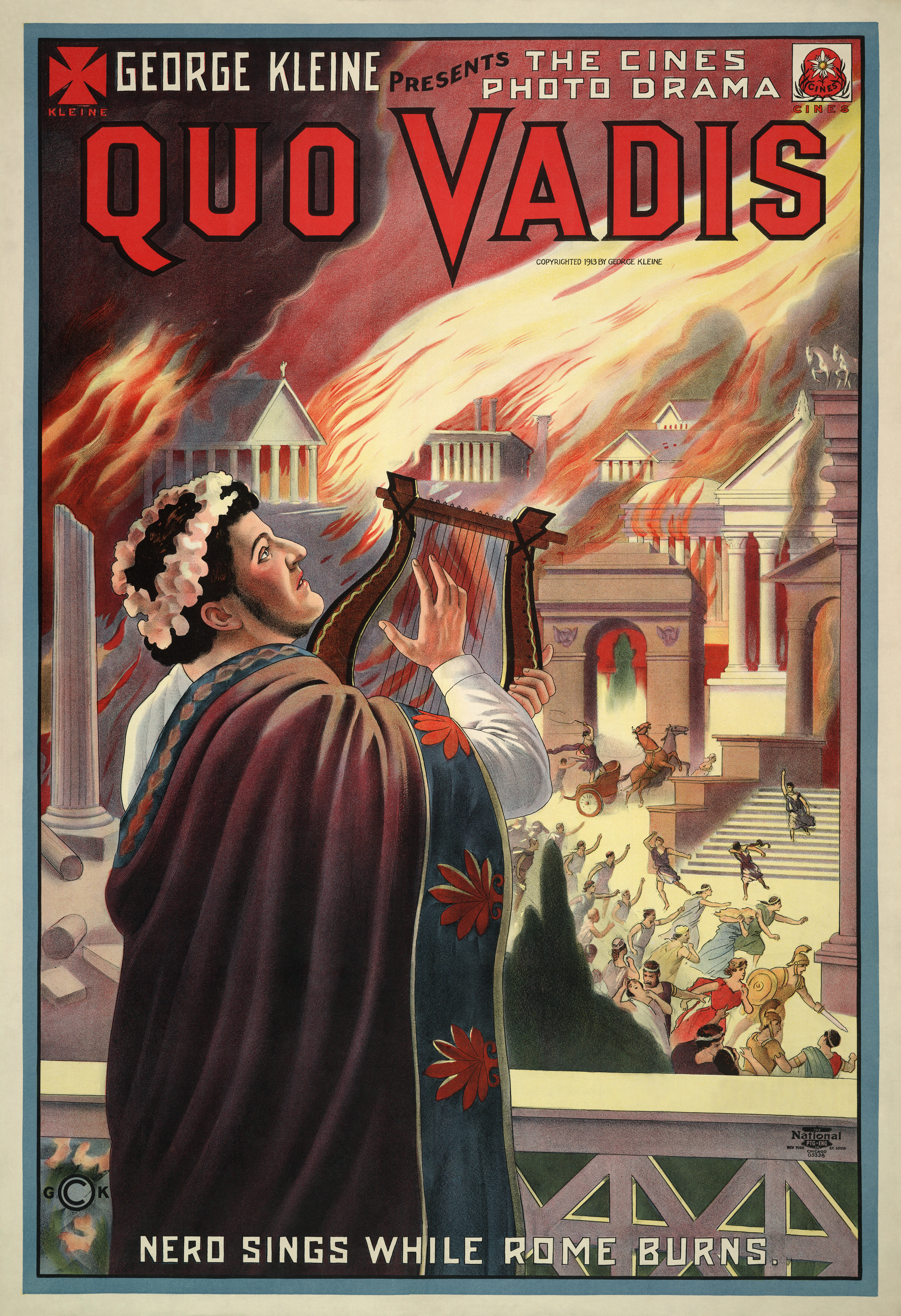
- Film poster
- Directed by: Enrico Guazzoni
- Written by: Enrico Guazzoni
- Based on: Quo Vadis; 1896 novel by Henryk Sienkiewicz
- Starring: Amleto Novelli; Gustavo Serena; Carlo Cattaneo; Amelia Cattaneo; Lea Giunchi; Bruto Castellani; Augusto Mastripietri; Cesare Moltini; Olga Brandini; Ignazio Lupi; Giovanni Gizzi; Lia Orlandini; Matilde Guillaume; Ida Carloni Talli
- Cinematography: Eugenio Bava; Alessandro Bona
- Production company: Cines
- Distributed by: George Kleine (U.S.)
- Release date: March 1913
- Running time: 120 minutes
- Country: Italy
- Language: Silent

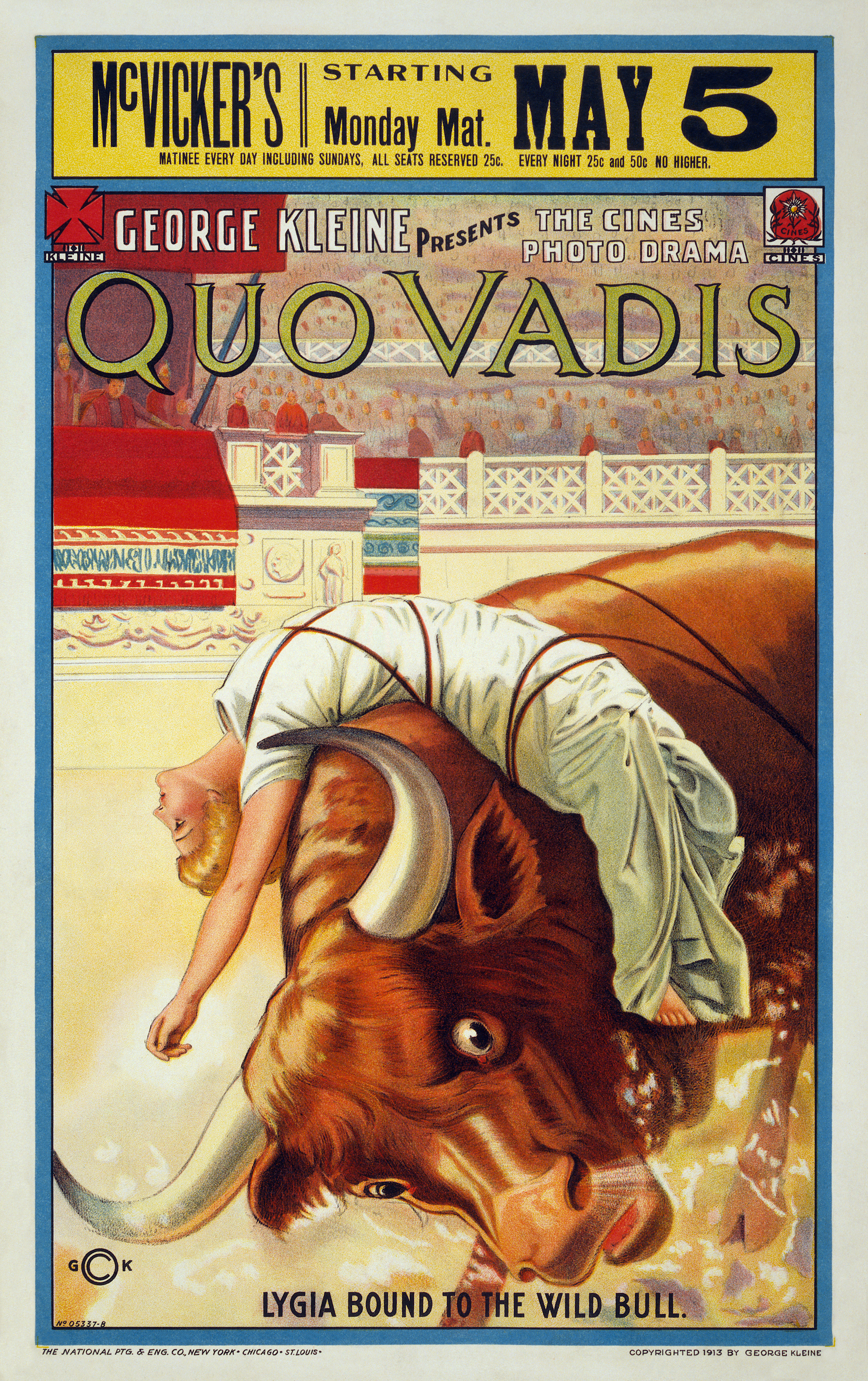
Poster showing Lygia bound to the bull

Quo Vadis is an Italian film directed by Enrico Guazzoni for Cines in 1913, based on the 1896 novel of the same name written by Henryk Sienkiewicz. It was one of the first blockbusters in the history of cinema, with 5,000 extras, lavish sets, and a lengthy running time of two hours, setting the standard for "superspectacles" for decades to come.

A worldwide success, it premiered in Germany at the opening night of the Ufa-Pavillon am Nollendorfplatz (Berlin's first purpose-built, free-standing cinema), on 19 March 1913. In an unusual departure from normal cinematic practice, the crowd scenes were reinforced with "special mobs" of live costumed actors in the auditorium. (Note: This practice seems to have begun with The Miracle, the world's first full-colour feature-length film which opened in London in December 1912 and in New York in April 1913. The US rights were owned by Al. Woods, an international theatre impresario who was also involved in the building of the Nollendorf Theatre in Berlin. The Miracle, with similar crowds of live costumed actors in the auditorium, opened in another Berlin cinema originally leased by Woods, the Ufa-Palast am Zoo, in May 1914.)

Quo Vadis was the first film to be projected in the Astor Theatre, a first-class theater on Broadway, where it was screened for nine months from April to December 1913. The film's first screening in London was for King George V, in the Royal Albert Hall, who complimented the performers.

The film

== Plot ==
The story is set during the latter years of the reign of the emperor Nero. Marcus Vinicius, one of Nero's military officers, falls in love with a young Christian hostage named Lygia. But their love is hindered by Nero, who has his soldiers burn Rome and pins the blame on the Christians. Nero launches a cruel persecution of the religious sect, who are sentenced to death in the Circus. Among the victims is Lygia. She is tied to the back of a bull in imitation of Europa. But her life is saved by her bodyguard Ursus, who wrestles and kills the bull.

== Cast ==
- Amleto Novelli as Vinicius
- Gustavo Serena as Petronius
- Amelia Cattaneo as Eunice
- Carlo Cattaneo as Nero
- Lea Giunchi as Lygia
- Augusto Mastripietri as Chilo
- Cesare Moltini as Tigellinus
- Olga Brandini as Poppaea
- Ignazio Lupi as Aulus
- Giovanni Gizzi as Saint Peter
- Lia Orlandini as servant Livia
- Matilde Guillaume
- Ida Carloni Talli as priestess
- Bruto Castellani as Ursus
- Giuseppe Gambardella

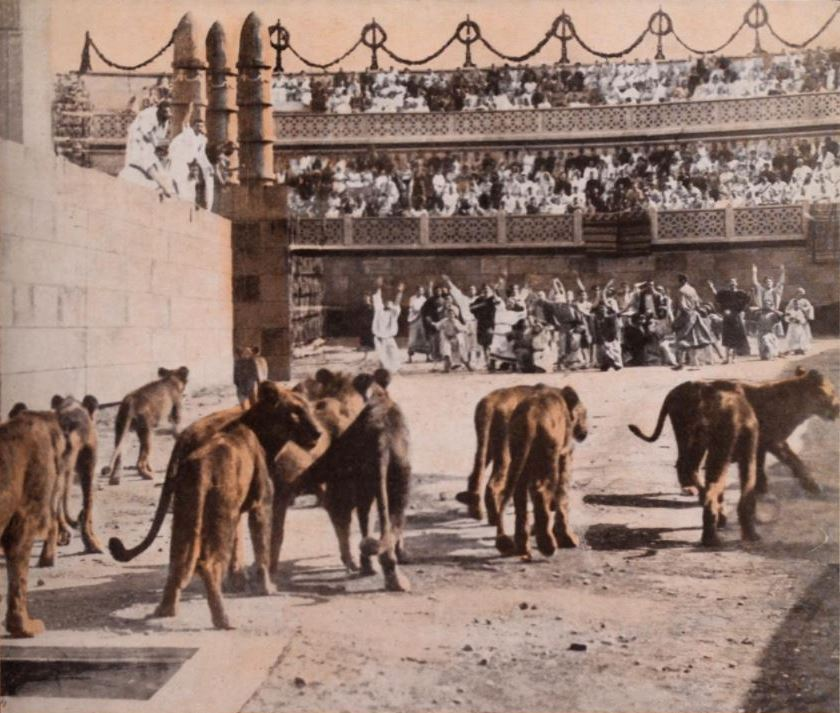
Tinted still from an American advertisement

== Other versions ==
- 1901 film directed by Lucien Nonguet and Ferdinand Zecca
- 1924 film directed by Gabriellino D'Annunzio and Georg Jacoby, produced by Arturo Ambrosio
- 1951 film directed by Mervyn LeRoy
- 1985 TV mini-series directed by Franco Rossi
- 2001 film directed by Jerzy Kawalerowicz
- 2002 TV series (6 ep.) directed by Jerzy Kawalerowicz

== Removal from U.S. distribution ==
When the 1924 version was issued, to prevent theatres from showing the 1913 film in competition, the Unione Cinematografica Italiana purchased all rights to the performance of 1913 film in the United States and Australia, including the existing inventory of film prints, stills, posters, and glass slides, from George Kleine, who had obtained the U.S. rights back in 1913.

== Notes ==
- The Peplum in the days of silent cinema, 1, ch. of "Cinema Peplum" Dominic Cammarota, "Future essays" n. 14, and. Fanucci, '87, p. 15th
- The Dictionary of film Mereghetti-2002-cards, ed. Baldini & Castoldi, 2001, p. 1711.
