= The Revenge of Maciste =

1921 film

- Directed by: Luigi Romano Borgnetto
- Written by: Camillo Bruto Bonzi; Luigi Romano Borgnetto
- Starring: Bartolomeo Pagano; Henriette Bonard; Erminia Zago
- Production company: Itala Film
- Distributed by: Unione Cinematografica Italiana
- Release date: 18 August 1921
- Country: Italy
- Languages: Silent; Italian intertitles

The Revenge of Maciste (Italian: La rivincita di Maciste) is a 1921 Italian silent comedy adventure film directed by Luigi Romano Borgnetto and starring Bartolomeo Pagano, Henriette Bonard and Erminia Zago. It is part of the series of Maciste films.

== Cast ==
- Bartolomeo Pagano as Maciste
- Henriette Bonard as Miss Elisa Guappana
- Erminia Zago as Miss Dorothy Bull-Dog
- Guido Clifford
- Mario Voller-Buzzi
- Gino-Lelio Comelli
- Giulio Dogliotti
- Emilio Vardannes
- Leone Heller
- Felice Minotti

== Bibliography ==
- Roy Kinnard & Tony Crnkovich. Italian Sword and Sandal Films, 1908–1990. McFarland, 2017.
