= Quo Vadis (1924 film) =

1924 film

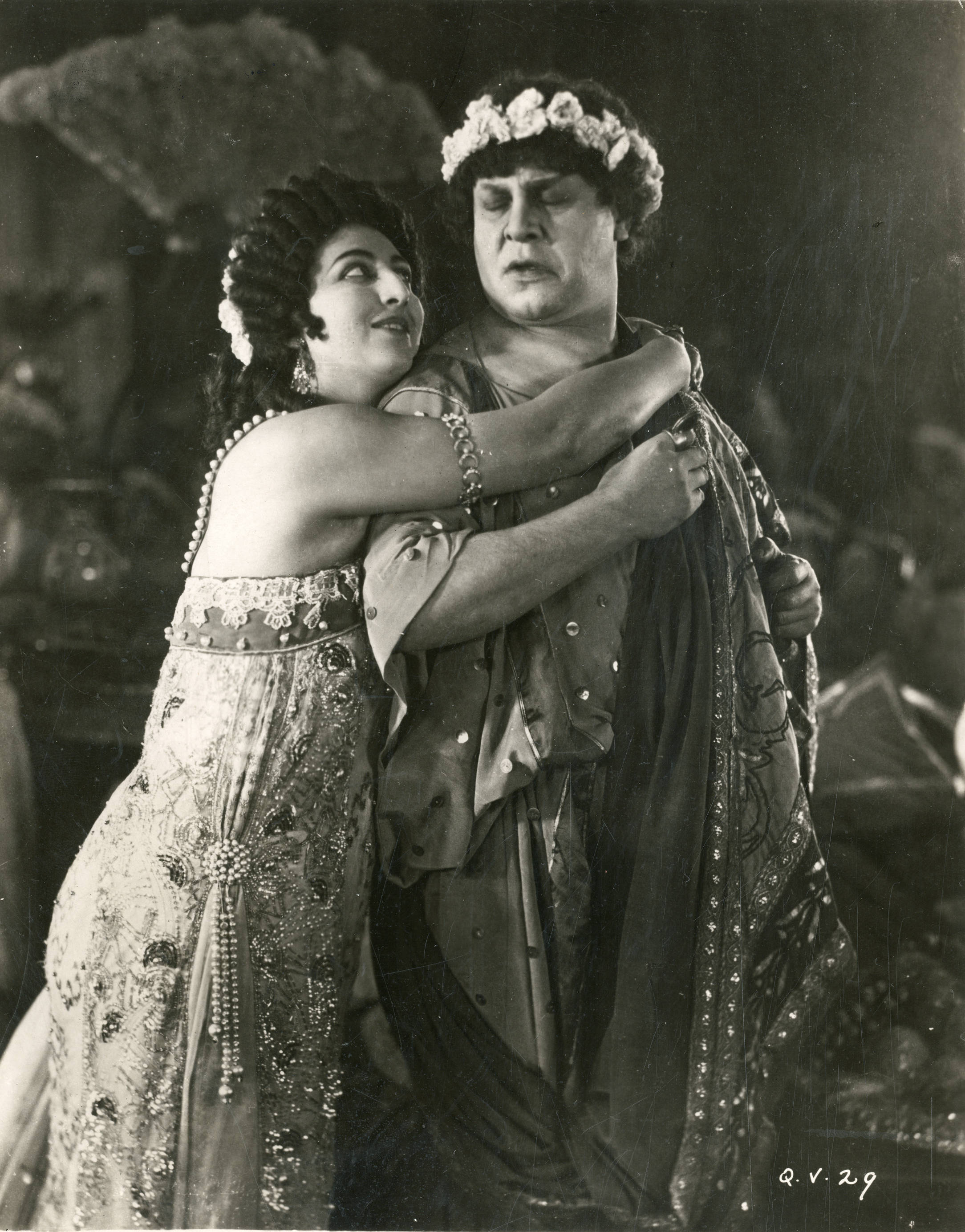
- Still with Emil Jannings
- Directed by: Arturo Ambrosio; Gabriellino D'Annunzio; Georg Jacoby
- Written by: Gabriellino D'Annunzio; Georg Jacoby
- Based on: Quo Vadis; 1896 novel by Henryk Sienkiewicz
- Produced by: Arturo Ambrosio
- Starring: Emil Jannings; Elena Sangro; Lillian Hall-Davis; Rina De Liguoro
- Cinematography: Curt Courant; Alfredo Donelli; Giovanni Vitrotti
- Production company: Unione Cinematografica Italiana
- Distributed by: Unione Cinematografica Italiana (Italy); First National Pictures (US)
- Release dates: October 1924 (Austria and Germany)
- Running time: 90 minutes 120 minutes (director's cut)
- Country: Italy
- Languages: Silent; Italian intertitles

Quo Vadis (or Quo Vadis?) is a 1924 Italian silent historical drama film directed by Gabriellino D'Annunzio and Georg Jacoby and starring Emil Jannings, Elena Sangro, and Lillian Hall-Davis. It is based on the 1896 novel Quo Vadis by Henryk Sienkiewicz which was notably later adapted into a 1951 film.

== Plot ==
In Rome, during the reign of Nero, a young pagan general named Marcus Vinicius falls in love with a beautiful Christian hostage named Licia. Their love appears to be impossible, because of the conflict of their religions. Nero burns the city of Rome and blames the Christians, already hated by the pagan Romans.

== Cast ==
- Emil Jannings as Nero
- Elena Sangro as Poppea
- Lillian Hall-Davis as Licia
- Rina De Liguoro as Eunice
- Andrea Habay as Petronius
- Raimondo Van Riel as Tigellinus
- Gildo Bocci as Vittelius
- Gino Viotti as Chilon Chilonides
- Alfons Fryland as Vinicius
- Bruto Castellani as Ursus
- Elga Brink as Domitilla
- Arnold Kent as Roman Guard
- Marcella Sabbatini as girl
- Lucia Zanussi

== Production ==
Unione Cinematografica Italiana announced the film in 1921, and began production in 1924. D'Annunzio, the son of the poet Gabriele D'Annunzio, was considered a rising director and also wrote the film's screenplay. It was one of several attempts in early Fascist Italy to recapture the success of the historical epics of the previous decade. Rudolph Valentino was invited to star in the film, but was forced to turn the offer down due to contractual reasons. Production quickly became troubled – the film ran seriously over-budget, and additional financing had to be raised from Germany. The new backers insisted that a German director, Jacoby, be appointed to co-direct.

The film was co-directed by Arturo Ambrosio, Georg Jacoby, and Gabriellino D'Annunzio. Bruno Kastner was initially cast for the film, but withdrew due to an illness causing all of his scenes to be reshot.

== Release ==
The film was distributed by First National Pictures in the United States.

== Reception ==
The film was a critical and commercial failure on its release, effectively ending the career of its producer Arturo Ambrosio, who had been one of the major figures of early Italian cinema. In its review The New York Times described it as "excellent as spectacle, but is too tedious in many sequences to be a good entertainment". D'Annunzio never directed or wrote another film. Jacoby's reputation also suffered heavily, and he switched to working on musicals and comedies. Emil Jannings's performance, on the other hand, received moderate praise. The New Yorker noted that Jannings was the "one item beside boredom" the movie had, but despite his "able performance" they "still prefer him in Germanic studio surroundings".

The French film star Max Linder and his wife Hélène watched the film in October 1925. Later, both were found with narcotics overdoses and slit wrists, resulting in their deaths of either a suicide pact or a murder-suicide. The suicide of Petronius and Eunice in the film has been proposed as an inspiration adding to Linder's previous depression.

== Works cited ==
- Medved, Harry; Medved, Michael (1984). The Hollywood Hall of Shame: The Most Expensive Flops in Movie History. Angus & Robertson. ISBN 0207149291.
