= Attorney for the Heart =

1927 film

- Austrian poster
- Directed by: Wilhelm Thiele
- Written by: George Froeschel (novella); Werner Scheff; Wilhelm Thiele
- Starring: Lil Dagover; Jean Murat; Ernst Stahl-Nachbaur
- Cinematography: Karl Puth
- Music by: Willy Schmidt-Gentner
- Production companies: Greenbaum Film; Lil-Dagover-Film
- Distributed by: Phoebus Film
- Release date: 7 November 1927
- Country: Germany
- Languages: Silent; German intertitles

Attorney for the Heart (German: Der Anwalt des Herzens) is a 1927 German silent romance film directed by Wilhelm Thiele and starring Lil Dagover, Jean Murat, and Ernst Stahl-Nachbaur. The film's sets were designed by the art director Alexander Ferenczy.

== Cast ==
- Lil Dagover as June Orchard
- Jean Murat as Dr. Robert Lingh
- Ernst Stahl-Nachbaur as James Rigdon
- Georg Baselt as William Pitt
- Hans Mierendorff as Senator Jensen
- Victor Colani as Erster Offizier
- Jaro Fürth as Monteur Jank
- Gertrud Eysoldt as Janks Frau
- Lilian Weiß as Mimi
- Käthe von Nagy

== Bibliography ==
- Grange, William (2008). Cultural Chronicle of the Weimar Republic. Lanham, MD: Scarecrow Press. ISBN 978-0-8108-5967-8.
