= A Night at the Grand Hotel =

1931 film directed by Max Neufeld

- Directed by: Max Neufeld
- Written by: Erich Fejer; Paul Frank
- Produced by: Friedrich Harnisch; Herman Millakowsky; Seymour Nebenzal
- Starring: Mártha Eggerth; Ulrich Bettac; Kurt Gerron
- Cinematography: Otto Kanturek
- Edited by: Herbert Selpin
- Music by: Otto Stransky
- Production companies: Thalia-Film; Nero Film
- Distributed by: Bavaria Film
- Release date: 8 December 1931
- Running time: 91 minutes
- Country: Germany
- Language: German

A Night at the Grand Hotel (German: Eine Nacht im Grandhotel) is a 1931 German drama film directed by Max Neufeld and starring Mártha Eggerth, Ulrich Bettac, and Kurt Gerron. It was shot at the Johannisthal Studios in Berlin. The film's sets were designed by the art director Ernö Metzner. A separate French version La Femme de mes rêves was also released.

== Cast ==
- Mártha Eggerth as Glay
- Ulrich Bettac as Fritz Ebner
- Max Schipper as Max
- Kurt Gerron as Achaz
- Karl Etlinger as Gallison
- Willy Prager as Lorbeer
- Margot Landa as Mizzi
- Egon Brosig as Kellner
- Ernst Reicher as Hoteldirektor
- Leo Monosson as Hotel sänger

== Bibliography ==
- Bock, Hans-Michael; Bergfelder, Tim, eds. (2009). The Concise Cinegraph: Encyclopaedia of German Cinema. New York: Berghahn Books. ISBN 978-1-57181-655-9.
