= Alexander Ferenczy =

- Born: 16 January 1895; Budapest, Austria-Hungary
- Died: 1 March 1931 (aged 36); Neubabelsberg, Brandenburg, Germany
- Occupation: Art director
- Years active: 1922-1931 (film)

Alexander Ferenczy (1895–1931) was a Hungarian art director.

== Selected filmography ==
- Samson and Delilah (1922)
- The Portrait (1923)
- Fadette (1926)
- Attorney for the Heart (1927)
- The Gypsy Baron (1927)
- Modern Pirates (1928)
- Escape from Hell (1928)
- Casanova's Legacy (1928)
- My Sister and I (1929)
- Checkmate (1931)
- Alarm at Midnight (1931)

== Bibliography ==
- Tabori, Paul. Alexander Korda. Living Books, 1966.
