= The Last Tsars =

1928 film

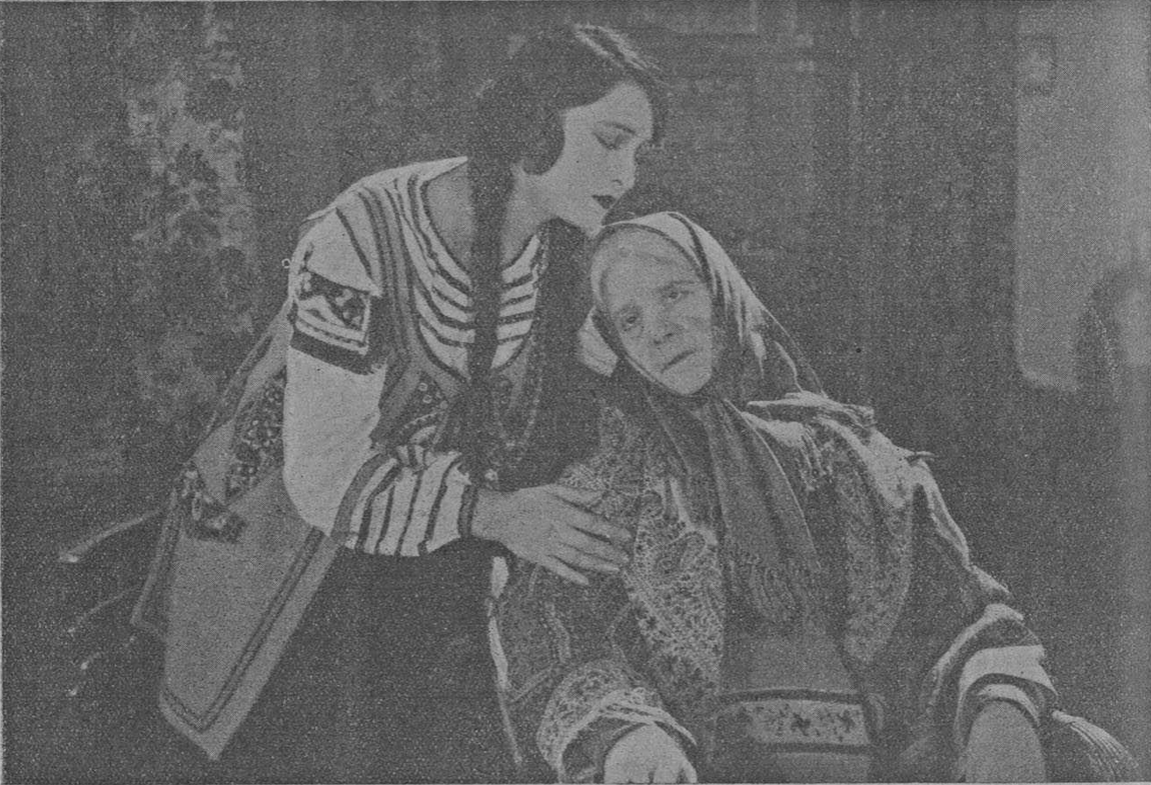
- Directed by: Baldassarre Negroni
- Starring: Bartolomeo Pagano; Elena Lunda
- Cinematography: Ubaldo Arata
- Production company: Societa Anonima Stefano Pittaluga
- Distributed by: Societa Anonima Stefano Pittaluga
- Release date: August 1928
- Country: Italy
- Languages: Silent; Italian intertitles

The Last Tsars (Italian: Gli ultimi zar) is a 1928 Italian silent film directed by Baldassarre Negroni and starring Bartolomeo Pagano, Elena Lunda and Amilcare Taglienti.

== Cast ==
- Bartolomeo Pagano as Maciste
- Elena Lunda
- Amilcare Taglienti
- Franz Sala
- Sandro Ruffini
- Elizabeth Grey
- Alberto Pasquali
- Augusto Bandini
- Andrea Miano
- Felice Minotti

== Bibliography ==
- Moliterno, Gino. The A to Z of Italian Cinema. Scarecrow Press, 2009.
