= The House of Pulcini =

1924 film

- Directed by: Mario Camerini
- Written by: Mario Camerini
- Starring: Diomira Jacobini; Amleto Novelli; Franz Sala
- Cinematography: Ottavio De Matteis
- Production company: Societa Anonima Stefano Pittaluga
- Distributed by: Societa Anonima Stefano Pittaluga
- Release date: September 1924
- Country: Italy
- Languages: Silent; Italian intertitles

The House of Pulcini (Italian: La casa dei pulcini) is a 1924 Italian silent film directed by Mario Camerini and starring Diomira Jacobini, Amleto Novelli and Franz Sala.

== Cast ==
- Diomira Jacobini as Lauretta
- Amleto Novelli as Count Landi
- Franz Sala as Uncle
- Giuseppe Brignone as Teacher
- Armand Pouget as An adventurer
- Rita D'Harcourt as The governess
- Alex Bernard
- Felice Minotti

== Bibliography ==
- Poppi, Roberto. I registi: dal 1930 ai giorni nostri. Gremese Editore, 2002.
