= Take Care of Amelia =

1925 film

- Directed by: Telemaco Ruggeri
- Written by: Georges Feydeau (play); Lucio D'Ambra
- Starring: Pina Menichelli; Elena Lunda; Marcel Lévesque
- Production company: Rinascimento Film
- Distributed by: Rinascimento Film
- Release date: March 1925
- Running time: 79 minutes
- Country: Italy
- Languages: Silent; Italian intertitles

Take Care of Amelia (Italian: Occupati d’Amelia) is a 1925 Italian silent comedy film directed by Telemaco Ruggeri and starring Pina Menichelli, Marcel Lévesque and Elena Lunda. It is based on the 1908 play Occupe-toi d'Amélie! by Georges Feydeau, which has been made into several films. It was the final film to star Menichelli, one of the leading divas of early Italian cinema.

== Cast ==
- Camillo De Riso
- Elena Lunda
- Marcel Lévesque
- Pina Menichelli as Amelia
- Carlo Reiter

== Bibliography ==
- Angela Dalle Vacche. Diva: Defiance and Passion in Early Italian Cinema. University of Texas Press, 2008.
- Goble, Alan. The Complete Index to Literary Sources in Film. Walter de Gruyter, 1999.
