= Telemaco Ruggeri =

Italian actor and film director

- Born: 15 September 1876; Narni, Umbria, Italy
- Died: 15 October 1957 (aged 81); Rome, Lazio, Italy
- Occupations: Actor, Director
- Years active: 1913–1929 (film)

Telemaco Ruggeri (15 September 1876 – 15 October 1957) was an Italian actor and film director of the silent era.

== Selected filmography ==
- Floretta and Patapon (1913)
- Woman Against Woman (1921)
- Take Care of Amelia (1925)

== Bibliography ==
- Jandelli, Cristina. Le dive italiane del cinema muto. L'epos, 2006.
