= Cellio Bucchi =

Italian actor

- Occupation: Actor
- Years active: 1920-1945 (film)

Cellio Bucchi was an Italian film actor. He was active during the silent era, where he sometimes appeared in leading roles. Later he was a supporting actor in sound films of the 1930s and 1940s.

== Selected filmography ==
- La congiura di San Marco (1924)
- Hôtel Saint-Pol (1925)
- Nostradamus (1925)
- Beatrice Cenci (1926)
- The Courier of Moncenisio (1927)
- Company and the Crazy (1928)
- Assunta Spina (1930)
- Villafranca (1934)
- The Woman Thief (1938)
- The Count of Brechard (1938)
- The Woman of Monte Carlo (1938)
- Don Cesare di Bazan (1942)
- La casa senza tempo (1945)

== Bibliography ==
- Roy Kinnard & Tony Crnkovich. Italian Sword and Sandal Films, 1908–1990. McFarland, 2017.
