= Augusto Bandini =

Italian actor

- Born: 1 April 1889; Rome, Lazio, Italy
- Died: Unknown
- Occupation: Actor
- Years active: 1917–1939 (film)

Augusto Bandini (born 1889) was an Italian film actor. He appeared in more than forty productions, the majority of them during the silent era.

== Selected filmography ==
- Emperor Maciste (1924)
- Maciste's American Nephew (1924)
- Chief Saetta (1924)
- Saetta Learns to Live (1924)
- Pleasure Train (1924)
- Maciste in the Lion's Cage (1926)
- Beatrice Cenci (1926)
- The Giant of the Dolomites (1927)
- Goodbye Youth (1927)
- Floretta and Patapon (1927)
- The Last Tsars (1928)
- The Golden Vein (1928)
- The Confessions of a Woman (1928)
- Latin Quarter (1929)
- Judith and Holofernes (1929)
- Miss Europe (1930)
- The Man with the Claw (1931)
- Before the Jury (1931)
- Figaro and His Great Day (1931)
- Five to Nil (1932)

== Bibliography ==
- Vacche, Angela Dalle. Diva: Defiance and Passion in Early Italian Cinema. University of Texas Press, 2008.
