= List of Italian films of 1912 =

A list of films produced in Italy in 1912 (see 1912 in film):

Title	Director	Cast	Genre	Notes
1912
An Abbreviated Honeymoon				
Parsifal	Mario Caserini			
Abele fratricida				
The Lion Tonic				
'Twixt Love and War				
