= Nostradamus (1925 film) =

1925 film

- Directed by: Mario Roncoroni
- Written by: Michel Zévaco
- Starring: Cellio Bucchi
- Production company: Unione Cinematografica Italiana
- Distributed by: Unione Cinematografica Italiana
- Release date: March 1925
- Country: Italy
- Languages: Silent; Italian intertitles

Nostradamus is a 1925 Italian silent historical film directed by Mario Roncoroni and starring Cello Bucchi in the title role of Nostradamus. It was one of the final film's released by the Unione Cinematografica Italiana which went bankrupt around this time.

== Cast ==
- Nestore Aliberti
- Cellio Bucchi as Nostradmus
- Gino-Lelio Comelli
- Liana Mirette
- Andrea Revkieff
- Alessandra Romanowa
- Ilda Sibiglia
- Maria Toschi
- Romilde Toschi
- Santina Toschi
- Vallina
- Emilio Vardannes
- Achille Vitti

== Bibliography ==
- Vittorio Martinelli. Il cinema muto italiano: I film degli anni venti, 1924-1931. Nuova ERI-Edizioni RAI, 1996.
