= Company and the Crazy =

1928 film

- Italian: La compagnia dei matti
- Directed by: Mario Almirante
- Written by: Camillo Bruto Bonzi; Gino Rocca
- Starring: Vasco Creti
- Cinematography: Massimo Terzano
- Release date: 3 November 1928
- Country: Italy
- Language: Silent

Company and the Crazy (Italian: La compagnia dei matti) is a 1928 silent Italian film directed by Mario Almirante. The film features an early onscreen performance from Vittorio De Sica.

== Cast ==
- Vasco Creti as Momi Tamberlan
- Carlo Tedeschi as Bortolo Cioci
- Alex Bernard as Piero Scavezza
- Elena Lunda as Irma
- Lili Migliore as Ginetta
- Cellio Bucchi as Conte Bardonazzi
- Vittorio De Sica as Prof. Rosolillo
- Giuseppe Brignone as Sioria
- Felice Minotti
- Giuseppe Migliore
- Andrea Miano
- Amilcare Taglienti
