= List of French films of 1913 =

A list of films produced in France in 1913.

Title	Director	Cast	Genre	Notes
1870–1871	Henri Andréani			
210 contre 213	Joë Hamman	Joë Hamman		
L'Absente	Gérard Bourgeois			
Adrienne Lecouvreur	Henri Desfontaines, Louis Mercanton	Sarah Bernhardt, Ernest Legouvé		
Affaire d'honneur	Romeo Bosetti	Romeo Bosetti		
De Afwezige	Albert Capellani	Henri Étiévant, Henri Rollan, Jeanne Grumbach, Germaine Dermoz, Raymonde Dupré, Henri Collen		
L'Agonie de Byzance	Louis Feuillade	Luitz-Morat, Edmund Breon, Georges Melchior, Reusy, Jeanne Briey, Renée Carl, Fabienne Fabrèges, Laurent Morléas, Émilien Richard		
L'Aiglon	Émile Chautard	Pépa Bonafé, Émile Chautard, Marie-Louise Derval, Maxime Desjardins		
The Allanthus Silkworm				
Along the Banks of the River Eure				
Les Ananas				
André Deed veut être comique				
Cendrillon ou la Pantoufle merveilleuse	Georges Méliès			
Fantômas				
The Mystery of the Yellow Room	Emile Chautard, Maurice Tourneur	Marcel Simon, André Liabel, Paul Escoffier	Mystery	

== See also ==
- 1913 in France
