= Wladimiro De Liguoro =

Italian actor and film director

Wladimiro de Liguoro
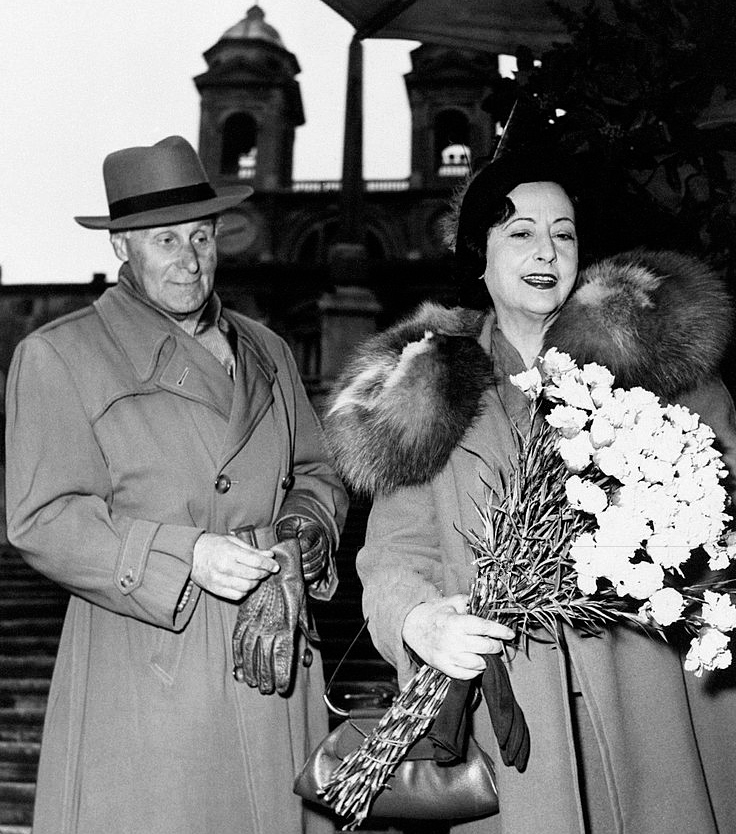
- Wladimiro and Rina De Liguoro in Rome in 1958
- Born: 11 October 1893; Naples, Italy
- Died: 31 August 1968 (aged 74); Rome, Italy
- Occupations: Director, actor
- Years active: 1912–1931

Wladimiro de Liguoro (11 October 1893 – 31 August 1968) was an Italian actor and film director. He was the son of the director Giuseppe de Liguoro and the brother of Eugenio de Liguoro. He was the husband of the film star Rina De Liguoro, who took her stage name from him.

== Selected filmography ==
- La statua di carne (1912)
- Verdi (1913)
- La bella corsara (1928)

== Bibliography ==
- Phillips, Alastair & Vincendeau, Ginette. Journeys of Desire: European Actors in Hollywood. British Film Institute, 2006.
