= Maciste against the Sheik =

1926 film

- Directed by: Mario Camerini
- Written by: Mario Camerini
- Starring: Bartolomeo Pagano; Franz Sala; Felice Minotti
- Cinematography: Anchise Brizzi
- Production company: Fert Film
- Distributed by: Societa Anonima Stefano Pittaluga
- Release date: February 1926
- Running time: 82 minutes
- Country: Italy
- Languages: Silent; Italian intertitles

Maciste against the Sheik (Italian: Maciste contro lo sceicco) is a 1926 Italian silent adventure film directed by Mario Camerini and starring Bartolomeo Pagano, Franz Sala, and Felice Minotti. It was part of the long running Maciste series of Peplum films.

== Plot ==
Maciste, an Italian strongman, faces off against a sheik known for causing trouble in a desert kingdom.

== Cast ==
- Bartolomeo Pagano as Maciste
- Franz Sala
- Felice Minotti
- Cecyl Tryan
- Rita D'Harcourt
- Arnold Kent
- Alex Bernard
- Oreste Grandi
- Armand Pouget
- Mario Saio
- F.M. Costa
- Michele Mikailoff

== See also ==
- Samson Against the Sheik (1962)

== Bibliography ==
- Brunetta, Gian Piero. The History of Italian Cinema: A Guide to Italian Film from Its Origins to the Twenty-first Century. Princeton University Press, 2009.
- Gundle, Stephen. Mussolini's Dream Factory: Film Stardom in Fascist Italy. Berghahn Books, 2013.
- Ricci, Steven. Cinema and Fascism: Italian Film and Society, 1922–1943. University of California Press, 2008.
