= The Beautiful Corsair =

1928 film

- Directed by: Wladimiro De Liguoro
- Written by: Wladimiro De Liguoro; N. Dubrewsky (novel)
- Starring: Rina De Liguoro; Bruto Castellani; Carlos Montes
- Cinematography: Alfredo Donelli; Gabriele Gabrielian
- Production company: I.C.S.A.
- Distributed by: I.C.S.A.
- Release date: 31 August 1928
- Running time: 54 minutes
- Country: Italy
- Languages: Silent; Italian intertitles

The Beautiful Corsair (Italian: La bella corsara) is a 1928 Italian silent film directed by Wladimiro De Liguoro and starring Rina De Liguoro, Bruto Castellani and Carlos Montes.

== Cast ==
- Rina De Liguoro as La bella corsara
- Carlos Montes as Il corsaro della nave nemica
- Bruto Castellani as L'altro corsaro

== Bibliography ==
- Monaco, James. Film Actors Guide. Scarecrow Press, 1977.
