= Gabriellino D'Annunzio =

Italian actor (1886–1945)

Gabriele Maria D'Annunzio
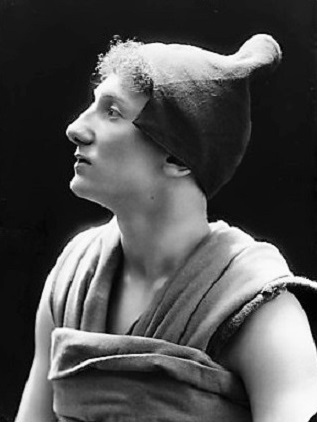
- Born: Gabriele Maria D'Annunzio; 10 April 1886; Rome, Italy
- Died: 8 December 1945 (aged 59); Rome, Italy
- Occupations: Actor, Writer, Director
- Years active: 1910 – 1925 (film)

Gabriele Maria "Gabriellino" D'Annunzio (10 April 1886 – 8 December 1945) was an Italian actor, screenwriter and film director. He was the son of the Italian writer Gabriele D'Annunzio. He adapted the 1921 film The Ship from a novel by his father. In 1924 he co-directed the epic Quo Vadis with Georg Jacoby, but the project was a commercial failure and he retired from filmmaking. He died on 8 December 1945 at 59 years old, due to a disease that afflicted him.

== Selected filmography ==
- The Ship (1921)
- Quo Vadis (1924)

== Bibliography ==
- Brunetta, Gian Piero (2009). The History of Italian Cinema: A Guide to Italian Film from Its Origins to the Twenty-first Century. Princeton: Princeton University Press. ISBN 978-0691119885.
