= The Song of the Sun =

1933 film directed by Max Neufeld

- Directed by: Max Neufeld
- Written by: Ferruccio Biancini; Hans Fritz Köllner
- Produced by: Angelo Besozzi; Alberto Giacalone
- Starring: Vittorio De Sica
- Cinematography: Eduard Hoesch
- Edited by: Fernando Tropea
- Release date: 1933
- Running time: 92 minutes
- Countries: Italy; Germany
- Language: Italian

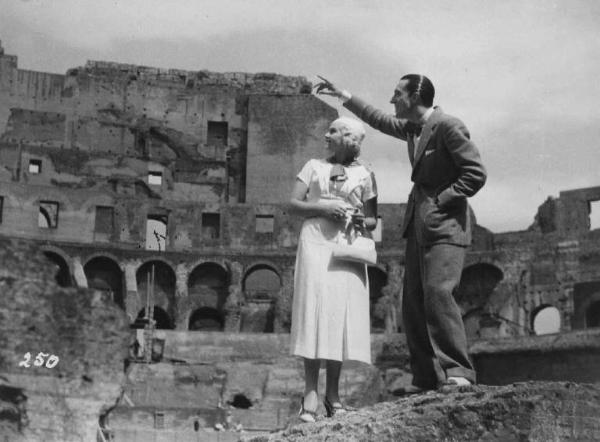
Liliana Deitz and Vittorio De Sica in Rome during the filming of The Song of the Sun

The Song of the Sun (Italian: La canzone del sole) is a 1933 Italian-German comedy film directed by Max Neufeld and starring Vittorio De Sica.

== Cast ==
- Giacomo Lauri Volpi as himself
- Vittorio De Sica as Paladino, l'avvocato
- Lilliane Dietz as Frida Brandt
- Eva Magni as Signora Bardelli
- Livio Pavanelli as Il Giornalista
- Umberto Melnati as Bardelli
- Celeste Almieri as Il Segretario
