= Judith and Holofernes (1929 film) =

1929 Italian silent film

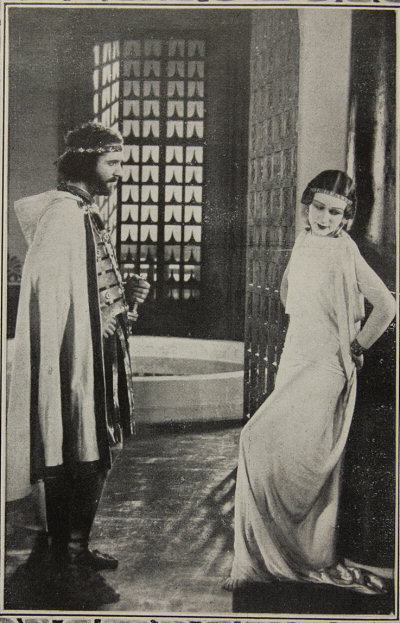
- Directed by: Baldassarre Negroni
- Written by: Giulio Lombardozzi
- Starring: Bartolomeo Pagano; Jia Ruskaja; Franz Sala
- Cinematography: Ubaldo Arata; Massimo Terzano
- Production company: Societa Anonima Stefano Pittaluga
- Distributed by: Societa Anonima Stefano Pittaluga
- Release date: January 1929
- Running time: 101 minutes
- Country: Italy
- Languages: Silent; Italian intertitles

Judith and Holofernes (Italian: Giuditta e Oloferne) is a 1929 Italian silent historical film directed by Baldassarre Negroni and starring Bartolomeo Pagano, Jia Ruskaja and Franz Sala. It was the final film of Pagano, who had been famous during the silent era for his portrayals of Maciste.

The film is based on the story of Judith beheading Holofernes. A 1959 film, Judith and Holofernes, was also inspired by the tale.

== Cast ==
- Bartolomeo Pagano
- Jia Ruskaja
- Franz Sala
- Carlo Tedeschi
- Giuseppe Brignone
- Augusto Bandini
- Felice Minotti
- Lore Lay
- Giorgio Curti
- Anna Mari
- Andrea Bani
- Nino Altieri

== See also ==
- Judith of Bethulia (1914)

== Bibliography ==
- Moliterno, Gino. The A to Z of Italian Cinema. Scarecrow Press, 2008.
