= Ernst Arndt (actor) =

German actor

- Born: 3 February 1861; Magdeburg, Kingdom of Prussia
- Died: c. September 1942 (aged 81); Treblinka extermination camp, General Government (Nazi-occupied Poland)
- Occupation: Actor

Ernst Arndt (3 February 1861 – c. September 1942) was a German Jewish stage and film actor notable for his later career in Austria.

== Life ==
Arndt was born in Magdeburg, Kingdom of Prussia. From 1910 he was a member of the Burgretheater ensemble in Vienna. He also made occasional appearances in supporting roles in films. On 13 March 1931, he was made an Honorary Citizen of Vienna.

On 10 July 1942, at the age of 81, he was deported to the Theresienstadt Ghetto, and from there on 23 September of the same year to Treblinka extermination camp, where he is presumed to have been murdered shortly afterward.

== Filmography ==
- Herbstzauber (1918, directed by Emil Albes, Germany) as agricultural labourer
- Der Umweg zur Ehe (1919, directed by Fritz Freisler, Germany) as Joe Castor
- Seine Durchlaucht der Landstreicher (1919, directed by Paul L. Stein, Austria)
- Licht und Schatten (1919, directed by Artur Holz, Austria)
- A Vanished World (1922, directed by Alexander Korda, Austria)
- Samson und Delila (1922, directed by Alexander Korda, Austria) as impresario
- The Prince of Arcadia (1932, directed by Karl Hartl, Austria)
- Die grausame Freundin (1932, directed by Carl Lamač, Germany) as Professor Bierbrot
- Gently My Songs Entreat (1933, directed by Willi Forst, Germany / Austria) (uncredited)
- When You're Young, the World Belongs to You (1934, directed by Henry Oebels, Austria) as village organist
- Bretter, die die Welt bedeuten (1935, directed by Kurt Gerron, Austria ) as Seifert, Katja's uncle (final film role)
