= The Second Wife (1922 film) =

1922 film directed by Amleto Palermi

- Directed by: Amleto Palermi
- Written by: Arthur Wing Pinero (play); Amleto Palermi
- Starring: Pina Menichelli; Elena Lunda; Alfredo Martinelli
- Cinematography: Giovanni Grimaldi
- Production company: Rinascimento Film
- Distributed by: Rinascimento Film
- Release date: May 1922
- Running time: 91 minutes
- Country: Italy
- Languages: Silent; Italian intertitles

The Second Wife or The Second Mrs. Tanqueray (Italian: La seconda moglie) is a 1922 Italian silent drama film directed by Amleto Palermi and starring Pina Menichelli, Elena Lunda and Alfredo Martinelli. It is an adaptation of Arthur Wing Pinero's 1893 British play The Second Mrs Tanqueray, about a woman who struggles to overcome rumours about her past.

== Cast ==
- Alfredo Bertone
- Orietta Claudi
- Elena Lunda
- Alfredo Martinelli
- Alfredo Menichelli
- Pina Menichelli
- Livio Pavanelli

== Bibliography ==
- Angela Dalle Vacche. Diva: Defiance and Passion in Early Italian Cinema. University of Texas Press, 2008.
