= The Courier of Moncenisio (1927 film) =

1927 film

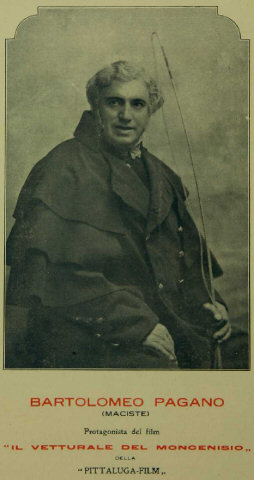
- Poster in Italian of Bartolomeo Pagano from The Courier of Moncenisio (Italian: Il vetturale del Moncenisio)
- Directed by: Baldassarre Negroni
- Written by: Joseph Bouchardy (play); Baldassarre Negroni
- Starring: Bartolomeo Pagano; Rina De Liguoro; Umberto Casilini
- Cinematography: Ubaldo Arata
- Production company: Societa Anonima Stefano Pittaluga
- Distributed by: Societa Anonima Stefano Pittaluga
- Release date: 14 October 1927
- Running time: 93 minutes
- Country: Italy
- Languages: Silent; Italian intertitles

The Courier of Moncenisio (Italian: Il vetturale del Moncenisio) is a 1927 Italian silent drama film directed by Baldassarre Negroni and starring Bartolomeo Pagano, Rina De Liguoro and Umberto Casilini. It is an adaptation of the 1852 play Jean le cocher by Joseph Bouchardy.

== Cast ==
- Bartolomeo Pagano as Gian-Claudio Thibaut
- Rina De Liguoro as Genoveffa
- Umberto Casilini as Ludovico, conte di Arezzo
- Alex Bernard as Pietruccio, il campanaro
- Cellio Bucchi as Il colonello Rouger
- Giuseppe Brignone as Il parroco di S. Martino
- Mimi Dovia as Giovanna Thibaut
- Manlio Mannozzi as Enrico Rouger
- Oreste Grandi as Morel
- Carlo Valenzi as Napoleone
- Felice Minotti
- Andrea Milano

== Bibliography ==
- Moliterno, Gino. The A to Z of Italian Cinema. Scarecrow Press, 2008.
