= Franz Sala =

Italian actor

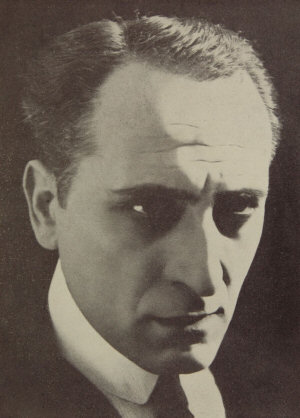
- Franz Sala ca. 1920
- Born: 17 December 1886; Alessandria, Piedmont; Italy
- Died: November 1952 (aged 65); Rome, Lazio; Italy
- Occupations: Actor; Makeup artist
- Years active: 1912–1952 (film)

Franz Sala (1886–1952) was an Italian film actor who appeared in over seventy films, mostly during the silent era. As his acting career wound down, he began to work as a makeup artist often credited as Francesco Sala. In some of his earliest films he played leading roles, but later often played supporting parts such as in Emperor Maciste (1924).

== Selected filmography ==
=== Actor ===
- La signorina Ciclone (1916)
- Lucciola (1917)
- Zingari (1920)
- Le campane di San Lucio (1921)
- The House of Pulcini (1924)
- Pleasure Train (1924)
- Emperor Maciste (1924)
- Saetta Learns to Live (1924)
- Chief Saetta (1924)
- Beatrice Cenci (1926)
- Maciste against the Sheik (1926)
- Maciste in the Lion's Cage (1926)
- The Last Tsars (1928)
- Judith and Holofernes (1929)
- The Song of Love (1930)
- Before the Jury (1931)
- Cardinal Messias (1939)

=== Makeup artist ===
- 1860 (1934)
- Three Cornered Hat (1935)

== Bibliography ==
- Waldman, Harry. Missing Reels: Lost Films of American and European Cinema. McFarland, 2000.
