= List of Italian films of 1920 =

A list of films produced in Italy in 1920 (see 1920 in film):

Title	Director	Cast	Genre	Notes
1920
A piedigrotta				
L' Affresco di Pompei				
Al di là della vita				
Alba rossa				
The Monster of Frankenstein	Eugenio Testa	Luciano Albertini, Aldo Mezzanotte	Horror	
On with the Motley	Carmine Gallone	Soava Gallone		
The Sack of Rome	Enrico Guazzoni, Giulio Aristide Sartorio	Livio Pavanelli, Raimondo Van Riel	Historical	
