= Rosenhügel Studios =

Film studios located in Vienna

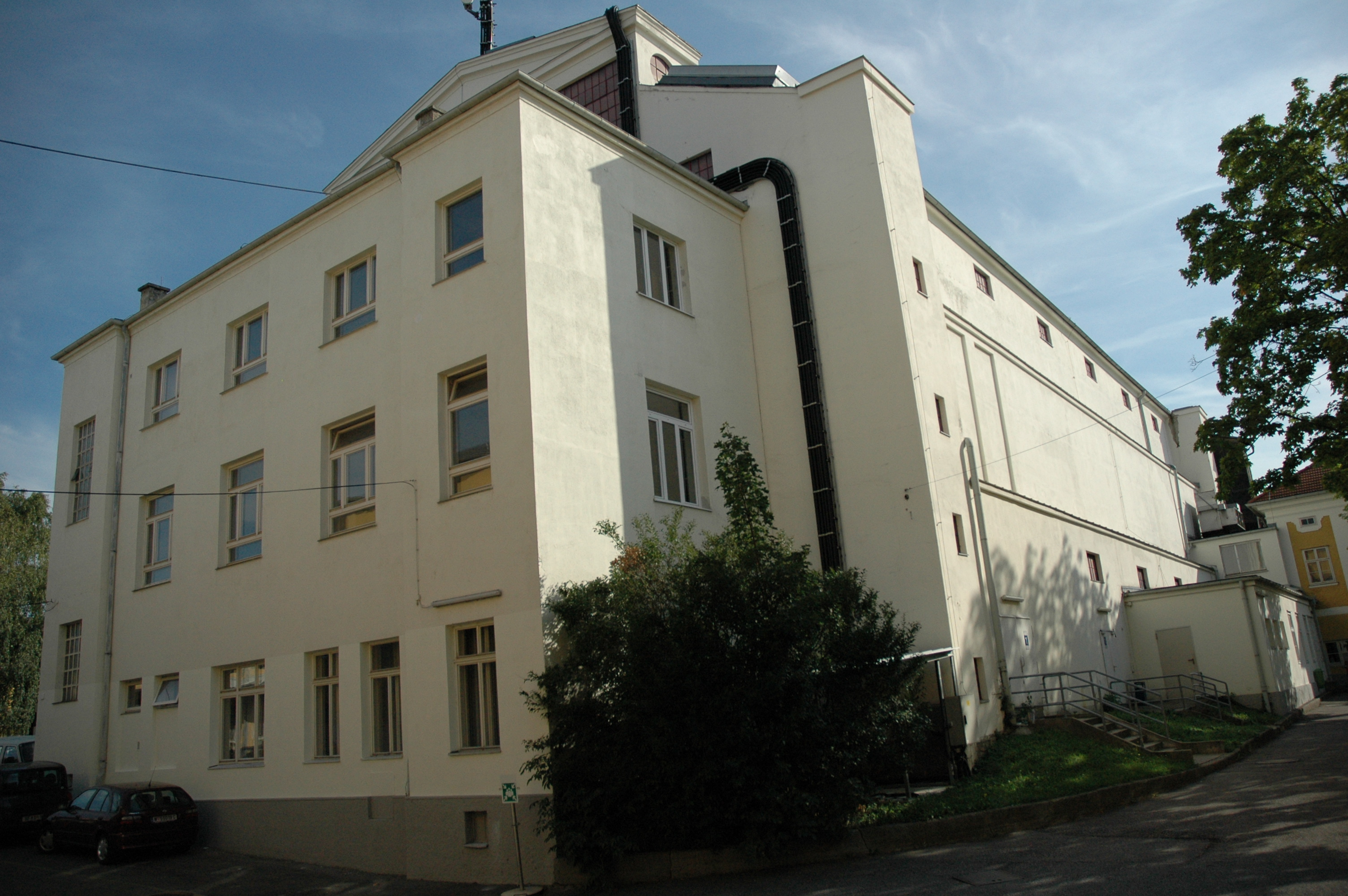
The studios in 2007.

The Rosenhügel Studios are film studios located in the Austrian capital Vienna. They were opened in 1923 and originally owned by the Vita-Film production company. After the company's bankruptcy the following year the studios were taken over by Sascha Film, the largest of the Austrian companies of the era. In the early 1930s Sascha formed a partnership with the German outfit Tobis Film to renovate the studios for production of sound films. A number of Austrian hit films were produced there during the remainder of the decade.

Following the Anschluss of 1938, the Austrian film industry was incorporated into that of Nazi Germany. Rosenhügel was taken over by the German-controlled Wien-Film under Karl Hartl.

From 1939 to 1941, a dubbing hall complex with a large and a small dubbing hall, editing rooms and offices was built next to the Rosenhügel studios. Joseph Goebbels is said to have commissioned the construction of the "Synchronhalle" himself in order to shoot Nazi propaganda films with the UFA film stars of the time in Vienna. A company-owned airport and a subway station directly in front of the entrance to the film studios were planned for fast transportation.

During the Soviet Occupation of East Vienna between 1945 and 1955, the studios were used for a mixture of entertainment films and Communist propaganda works. After the Soviet withdrawal the studios passed into the hands of democratic Austria, and it functioned as the country's largest studios.

At the beginning of October 2008, the ORF confirmed rumors that the sale of the Rosen Hügel studios was planned. The minimum purchase price should be 14 million euros. Filmstadt Wien-GmbH wants to move to the newly built Media Quarter Marx after the lease expires, which was extended from 2009 to 2014 by exercising an option.

In 2011 parts of the studio estate were sold off for demolition and redevelopment.

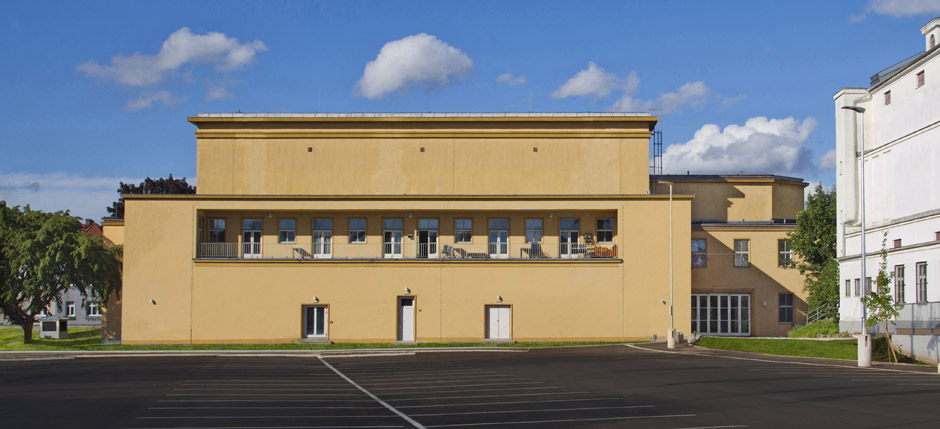
Synchron Stage Vienna building on the site of the former Rosenhügel film studios 2015

== Demolition and redevelopment of the area ==
Since 2014, the area of the former Rosenhügel film studios has been an urban development area of the City of Vienna. The redevelopment of the grounds was the subject of an architectural competition, which the architects Berger+Parkinnen & Christoph Lechner and the Parisian office Beckmann/N'Thepe won. Under the project name "Der Rosenhügel", 204 apartments on seven residential buildings, a kindergarten and a supermarket were built by May 2018. Due to monument protection, parts of the former film studios were preserved: Hall 1, the first artificial light recording hall, now serves as a training facility for rhythmic gymnastics, operated by ANPO Sporthalle GmbH.

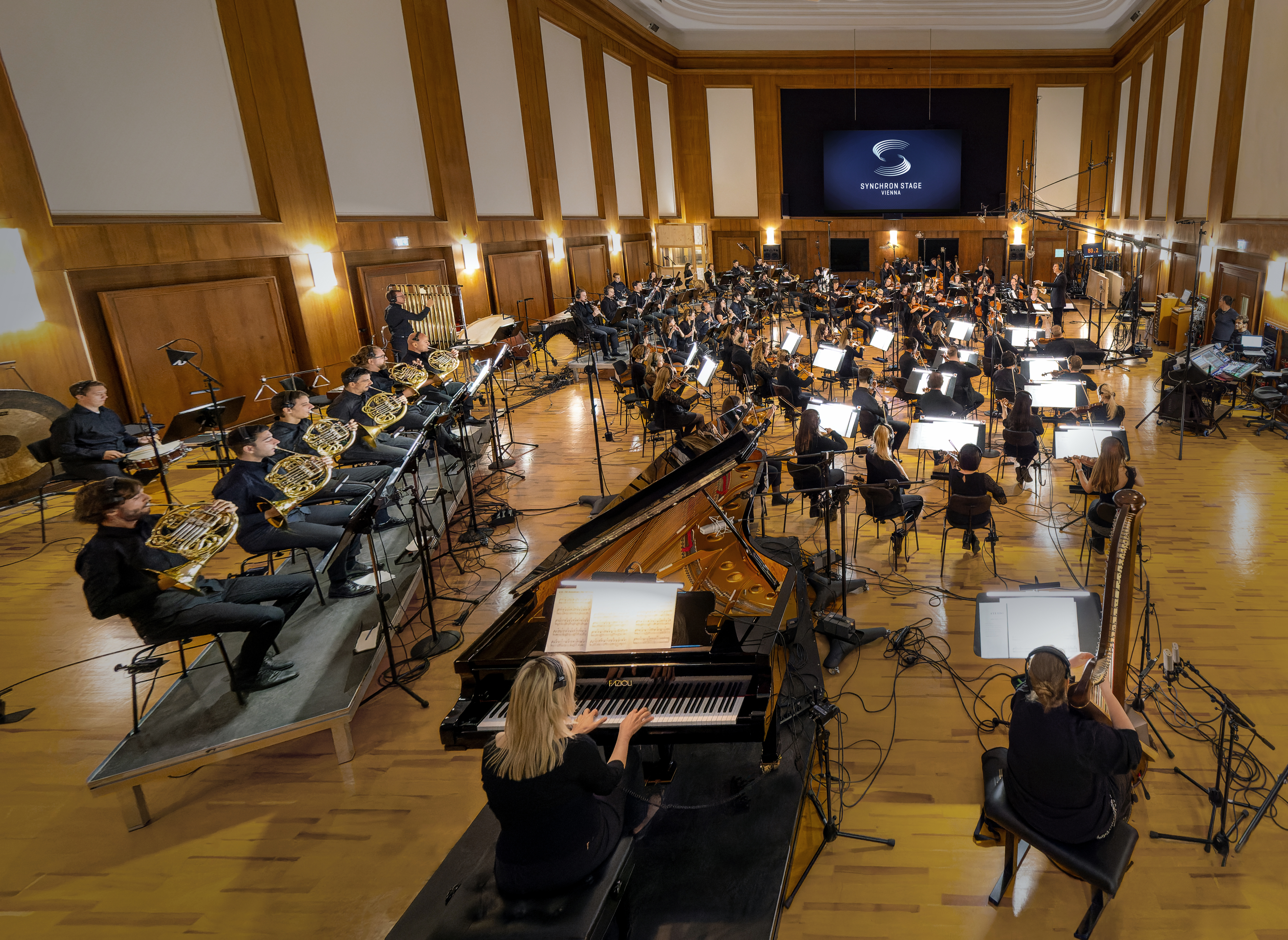
Large recording hall "Stage A" of the Synchron Stage Vienna 2022

Hall 6 ("Synchronhalle") was purchased by the Vienna Symphonic Library in 2013 and developed into a globally unique music production facility in collaboration with the renowned Walters-Storyk Design Group and architects Schneider+Schumacher. After its completion in September 2015, Synchron Stage Vienna features several recording and control rooms, editing studios, individual booths ("iso booths"), two instrument storage facilities with several pianos and concert grand pianos and approximately 300 percussion instruments, a music archive, break rooms, and offices and lounges for composers, producers, staff, and guests on a total area of more than 2,000 m^{2}. The heart of the modern music production facility is the large recording hall, Stage A: with its 540 m^{2}, it offers space for an orchestra of up to 130 people.

Evidence of the original use for film scoring is found in the preserved three-manual "Lenkwil" cinema organ, which, in addition to many percussion stops, has sound effects such as thunder rolls, car horns, horse gallops, birdsong or the sound of the sea. The organ is the only one of its kind in the world still integrated into its original scoring stage environment, which is why the building was declared a historic landmark in 2009.

== Rosenhügel films produced under Soviet occupation ==
- Child of the Danube (dir. Georg Jacoby, 1950)
- Spring on Ice (dir. Georg Jacoby, 1951)
- Das Herz einer Frau (dir. Georg Jacoby, 1951)
- Vanished Melody (dir. Eduard von Borsody, 1952)
- Abenteuer im Schloss (dir. Rudolf Steinboeck, 1952)
- Starfish (dir. Johann Alexander Hübler-Kahla, 1952)
- Daughter of the Regiment (dir. Georg C. Klaren, 1953)
- A Night in Venice (dir. Georg Wildhagen, 1953)
- Franz Schubert (dir. Walter Kolm-Veltée, 1953)
- Schicksal am Lenkrad (dir. Aldo Vergano, 1954)
- Der Komödiant von Wien (dir. Karl Paryla, 1954)
- Bel Ami (dir. Louis Daquin, 1955)
- Don Juan (dir. Walter Kolm-Veltée, 1955)
- Gasparone (dir. Karl Paryla, 1956)
- Fidelio (dir. Walter Felsenstein, 1956)
- Herr Puntila and His Servant Matti (dir. Alberto Cavalcanti, 1960)

== Bibliography ==
- Fritsche, Maria. Homemade Men in Postwar Austrian Cinema: Nationhood, Genre and Masculinity. Berghahn Books, 2013.
- Von Dassanowsky, Robert. Austrian Cinema: A History. McFarland, 2005.
