= The Giant of the Dolomites =

1927 film

- Directed by: Guido Brignone
- Written by: Guido Brignone
- Starring: Bartolomeo Pagano; Aldo Marus; Elena Lunda; Luigi Serventi
- Cinematography: Massimo Terzano
- Production company: Societa Anonima Stefano Pittaluga
- Release date: 20 January 1927
- Running time: 86 minutes
- Country: Italy
- Languages: Silent; Italian intertitles

The Giant of the Dolomites (Italian: Il gigante delle Dolomiti) is a 1927 Italian silent adventure film directed by Guido Brignone and starring Bartolomeo Pagano, Aldo Marus and Elena Lunda. It was the last in a series of silent films featuring the peplum hero Maciste, but the character was later revived in the 1960s.

== Cast ==
- Bartolomeo Pagano as Maciste, la guida alpina
- Aldo Marus as Il nipotino Hans
- Elena Lunda as Vanna Dardos
- Dolly Grey as Maud, la pittrice
- Andrea Habay as Ing. Ewert
- Luigi Serventi as Müller, l'avventurieno
- Oreste Grandi as Schulz il contrabbandiere
- Felice Minotti
- Mario Saio
- Augusto Poggioli
- Augusto Bandini

== Bibliography ==
- Brunetta, Gian Piero. The History of Italian Cinema: A Guide to Italian Film from Its Origins to the Twenty-first Century. Princeton University Press, 2009.
- Ricci, Steven. Cinema and Fascism: Italian Film and Society, 1922–1943. University of California Press, 2008.
