= Elena Lunda =

Italian actress

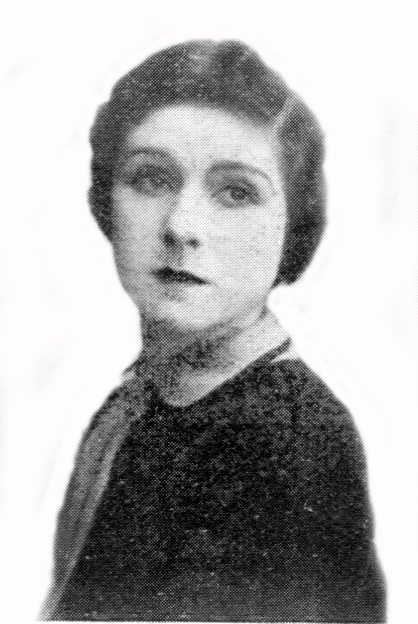
- Elena Lunda in 1928
- Occupation: Actor
- Years active: 1919–1928

Elena Lunda (1896–unknown) was an Italian actress known for her work in silent films. She was the daughter of Vittorio Lunda Gondola (Gundulić) from Ragusa/Dubrovnik and Celeste Grossi.

She was married to actor Alfredo Bertone and appeared in 35 Italian silent films between 1919 and 1928.

== Selected filmography ==
- The Sphinx (1920)
- The Knot (1921)
- The Second Wife (1922)
- La Boheme (1923)
- The Redemption (1924)
- Take Care of Amelia (1925)
- Women You Rarely Greet (1925)
- Women Who Fall by the Wayside (1925)
- The Assmanns (1925)
- The Man on the Comet (1925)
- The Love Trap (1925)
- The Ride in the Sun (1926)
- The Giant of the Dolomites (1927)
- Company and the Crazy (1928)
- The Last Tsars (1928)
- Company and the Crazy (1928)
