= Felice Minotti =

Italian actor (1887–1963)

- Born: 19 November 1887; Milan, Italy
- Died: 21 March 1963 (aged 75); Turin, Italy
- Occupation: Actor
- Years active: 1908-1963

Felice Minotti (19 November 1887 – 21 March 1963) was an Italian stage and film actor. He appeared in 91 films between 1908 and 1963.

== Selected filmography ==
- The Revenge of Maciste (1921)
- Maciste on Vacation (1921)
- The House of Pulcini (1924)
- Chief Saetta (1924)
- Emperor Maciste (1924)
- The Courier of Moncenisio (1927)
- Maciste against the Sheik (1926)
- The Giant of the Dolomites (1927)
- Company and the Crazy (1928)
- The Last Tsars (1928)
- The Carnival of Venice (1928)
- Judith and Holofernes (1929)
- When Naples Sings (1930)
- Villafranca (1934)
- Don Bosco (1935)
- Under the Southern Cross (1938)
- Pietro Micca (1938)
- The Sin of Rogelia Sanchez (1940)
- Blood Wedding (1941)
- The Son of the Red Corsair (1943)
- Two Hearts (1943)
- A Yank in Rome (1946)
- His Young Wife (1946)
- Eleven Men and a Ball (1948)
- Sicilian Uprising (1949)
- Anthony of Padua (1949)
- Women and Brigands (1950)
- Nobody's Children (1951)
- Piece of the Sky (1959)
