= Rina De Liguoro =

Italian actress (1892–1966)

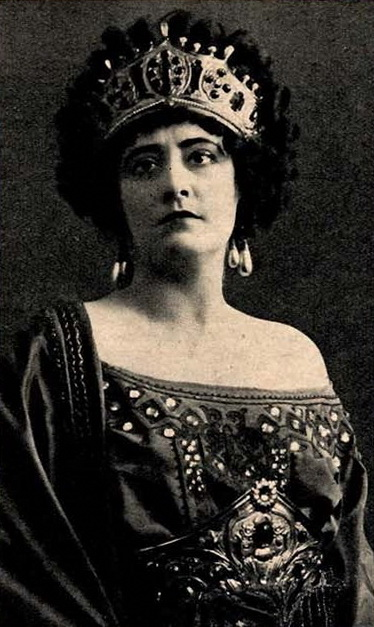
- Rina De Liguoro in Messalina (1924)
- Born: Elena Caterina Catardi; 24 July 1892; Florence, Italy
- Died: 15 April 1966 (aged 73); Rome, Italy
- Occupation: Film actress
- Years active: 1921–1963

Rina De Liguoro (24 July 1892 – 15 April 1966) was an Italian film actress. Born Elena Caterina Catardi, she changed her name after marrying film actor and director Wladimiro De Liguoro in 1918. She appeared in leading roles in a number of Italian epics during the 1920s such as The Last Days of Pompeii. She later appeared in character roles after an unsuccessful spell in Hollywood. Her final film was Luchino Visconti's The Leopard.

== Selected filmography ==
- Savitri Satyavan (1923)
- Messalina (1924)
- Quo Vadis (1924)
- The Hearth Turned Off (1925)
- The Last Days of Pompeii (1926)
- Anita (1927)
- The Loves of Casanova (1927)
- The Courier of Moncenisio (1927)
- Cagliostro (1929)
- The Mysterious Mirror (1928)
- The Beautiful Corsair (1928)
- Assunta Spina (1930)
- Madame Satan (1930)
- Romance (1930) as Nina
- Behold My Wife (1934)
- The Mad Empress (1939)
- Caterina da Siena (1947)
- Buffalo Bill in Rome (1949)
- Tomorrow Is Another Day (1951)
- The Leopard (1963)

== Bibliography ==
- Elley, Derek (1984). The Epic Film: Myth and History. London: Routledge. ISBN 978-0710099938.
