= Max Neufeld =

Austrian film director

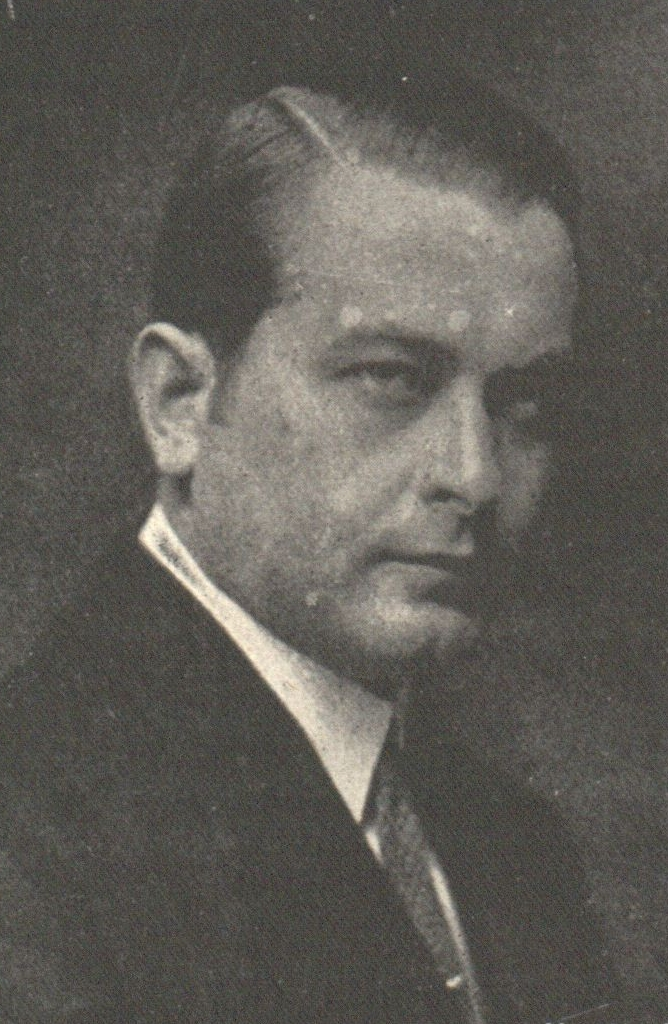
- Max Neufeld (1918)
- Born: 13 February 1887; Guntersdorf, Lower Austria, Austria-Hungary (now Austria)
- Died: 2 December 1967 (aged 80); Vienna, Austria
- Other names: Massimiliano Neufeld
- Occupations: Film director, actor, screenwriter
- Years active: 1913–1957
- Relatives: Eugen Neufeld (brother)

Max Neufeld (13 February 1887 – 2 December 1967) was an Austrian film director, actor and screenwriter. He directed 70 films between 1919 and 1957. He directed the 1934 film The Song of the Sun, which starred Vittorio De Sica.

== Selected filmography ==
=== Screenwriter ===
- After the Ball (1932)

=== Actor ===
- The Wedding of Valeni (1914)
- The Priest from Kirchfeld (1914)
- With Heart and Hand for the Fatherland (1915)
- On the Heights (1916)
- Summer Idyll (1916)
- The Black Hand (1917)
- Don Cesar, Count of Irun (1918)
- The Ancestress (1919)
- Doctor Ruhland (1920)
- Let the Little Ones Come to Me (1920)
- The Voice of Conscience (1920)
- The Dancing Death (1920)
- Eva, The Sin (1920)
- The Master of Life (1920)
- The Woman in White (1921)
- The Dead Wedding Guest (1922)
- Confessions of a Monk (1922)
- The Tales of Hoffmann (1923)
- The Transformation of Dr. Bessel (1927)
- The Priest from Kirchfeld (1926)
- The Arsonists of Europe (1926)
- Rasputin (1929) director and star

=== Director ===
- Doctor Ruhland (1920)
- Let the Little Ones Come to Me (1920)
- The Woman in White (1921)
- The Films of Princess Fantoche (1921)
- Light of His Life (1921)
- The Dead Wedding Guest (1922)
- The Iron King (1923)
- The Tales of Hoffmann (1923)
- A Waltz by Strauss (1925)
- The Family without Morals (1927)
- Archduke John (1929)
- Rasputin (1929)
- The Opera Ball (1931)
- A Night at the Grand Hotel (1931)
- Sehnsucht 202 (1932)
- A Bit of Love (1932)
- Monsieur, Madame and Bibi (1932)
- The Tsar's Diamond (1932)
- Overnight Sensation (1932)
- The Song of the Sun (1934)
- A Precocious Girl (1934)
- A Star Fell from Heaven (1934)
- Temptation (1934)
- Her Highness Dances the Waltz (1935)
- Antonia (1935)
- Fräulein Lilli (1936)
- The House of Shame (1938)
- Unjustified Absence (1939)
- The Castle Ball (1939)
- A Thousand Lire a Month (1939)
- The First Woman Who Passes (1940)
- Red Tavern (1940)
- The Tyrant of Padua (1946)
- Anni (1948)
- Abracadabra (1952)
- Der schönste Tag meines Lebens (1957)
