= Bruto Castellani =

Italian film actor (1881–1933)

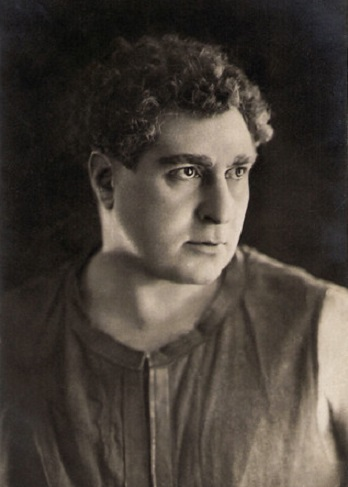
- Bruto Castellani
- Born: 1 December 1881; Rome, Lazio, Italy
- Died: 1933 (aged 51–52)
- Occupation: Actor
- Years active: 1911–1928 (film)

Bruto Castellani (1 December 1881– 1933) was an Italian film actor of the silent era. Castellani appeared in more than thirty films during his career, including Antony and Cleopatra (1913).

== Selected filmography ==
- Antony and Cleopatra (1913)
- Quo Vadis (1913)
- Julius Caesar (1914)
- Marco Visconti (1925)
- The Beautiful Corsair (1928)

== Bibliography ==
- Hatchuel, Sarah; Vienne-Guerrin, Nathalie (2009). Shakespeare on Screen: The Roman Plays. Presses universitaires de Rouen et du Havre. ISBN 978-2-87775-478-1.
