= Baldassarre Negroni =

Italian film director (1877–1948)

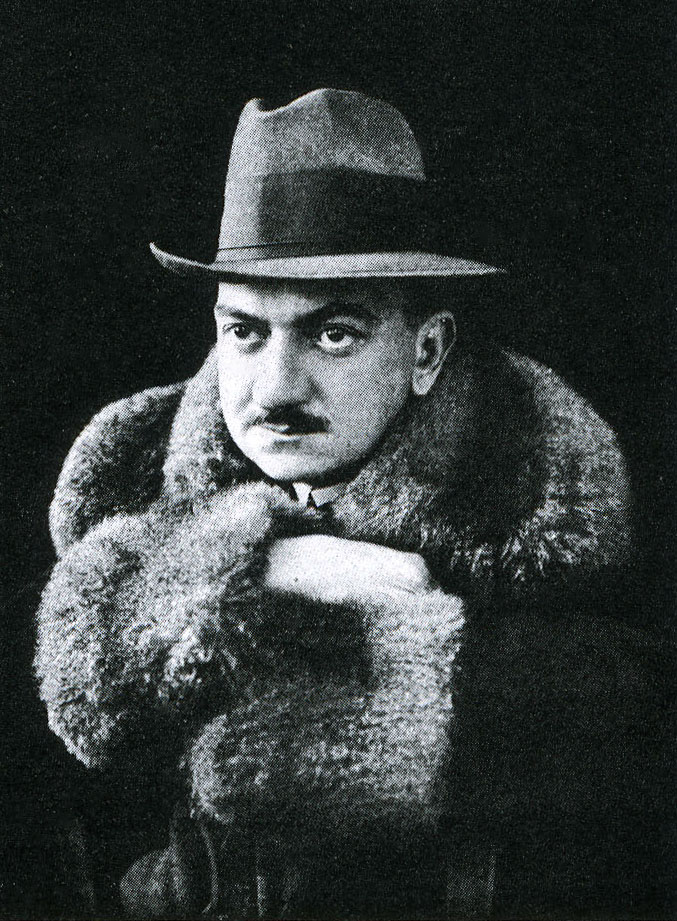
- Negroni in 1914
- Born: 21 January 1877; Rome, Italy
- Died: 18 July 1948 (aged 71); Rome, Italy
- Occupations: Film director, screenwriter
- Years active: 1912-1945

Baldassarre Negroni (21 January 1877 – 18 July 1948) was an Italian film director and screenwriter. He directed 89 films between 1912 and 1936. He directed the 1932 film Due cuori felici, which starred Vittorio De Sica.

== Biography ==
Baldassarre Negroni was born in Rome on 21 January 1877 into a noble family. He studied at the college of Mondragone and later graduated in law from the Sapienza University of Rome, going on to practise law and work as a stockbroker. Passionate about photography, he started his career in the film industry as a camera operator, working on short documentaries. In 1911, he was hired by Cines as a cameraman, later becoming their artistic director. His debut film was the comedy Primo Bisticcio. On 15 May 1912, he and the lawyer Gioacchino Mecheri founded the Celio Film Company.

Negroni played a pivotal role in the growth and consolidation of the emerging Italian film industry. He sponsored actors who went on to become some of the country's most renowned stars, including Alberto Collo, Emilio Ghione, and most notably, the diva Francesca Bertini – one of the most celebrated and versatile actresses in Italian silent cinema. Negroni directed Bertini in several films, including Lacrime e sorrisi (1912), Idillio tragico (1912), La maestrina (1913), L’arma dei vigliacchi (1913), Broken Idol (1913), and Pierrot the Prodigal (1914).

In the same period, Negroni directed L’anima del demi-monde (1913), written by the future director, Augusto Genina. From 1914 to 1915, he worked for the production company Milano Films. In 1915, he directed a film adaptation of Alexandre Dumas, fils' novel The Lady of the Camellias. Shot over just 16 days, the film premiered to enormous success at Rome's Cinema Modernissimo in August 1915. The film starred Hesperia (Olga Mambelli), who began an artistic and personal partnership with Negroni that culminated in their marriage in 1923.

From 1915 to 1921, Negroni worked at Tiber Film. The films he directed during this period were characterised by their highly innovative use of cinematographic techniques, particularly the use of close-ups. Between 1919 and 1922, he produced three of his finest works: La Fibra del Dolore (based on a story by Gaetano Campanile Mancini, 1919), Il Figlio di Madame San-Gêne (based on a play by Victorien Sardou and Émile Moreau, 1921) and La Belle Madame Hébért (based on a play by Abel Hermant, 1922). In the late 1920s, Negroni directed three successful films starring the popular actor Bartolomeo Pagano, who played Maciste: The Courier of Moncenisio (1927), The Last Tsars (1928) and Judith and Holofernes (1929).

In 1932, Negroni directed the comedy Two Happy Hearts. Starring Vittorio De Sica, Rina Franchetti and Mimì Aylmer, it was one of the greatest successes of his career. Negroni's final film was the comedy The Ambassador (1936), based on the play Le Diplomate by Eugène Scribe and Germain Delavigne. He then devoted himself exclusively to film production, contributing to some of the era's greatest hits, including Amleto Palermi's Naples of Olden Times (1938), Augusto Genina's The Siege of the Alcazar (1940) and De Sica's A Garibaldian in the Convent (1942). He died in Rome on 18 July 1945.

== Selected filmography ==
L'amazzone mascherata (1914)

- Pierrot the Prodigal (1914)
- The Lady of the Camellias (1915)
- The Courier of Moncenisio (1927)
- The Last Tsars (1928)
- Judith and Holofernes (1929)
- Two Happy Hearts (1932)
- Pergolesi (1932)
- Giallo (1933)
- Steel (1933)
- Bayonet (1936)
- The Ambassador (1936)
