= Bartolomeo Pagano =

Italian actor (1878–1947)

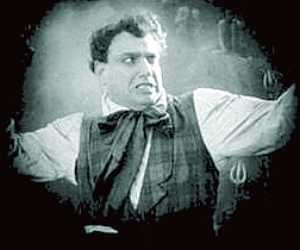
- Pagano as Maciste
- Born: 27 September 1878; Genoa, Liguria, Italy
- Died: 24 June 1947 (aged 68); Genoa, Liguria, Italy
- Occupation: Actor
- Years active: 1914–1929 (film)

Bartolomeo Pagano (27 September 1878 – 24 June 1947) was an Italian motion picture actor.

Before his cinema career, Pagano was a stevedore who worked at the port of Genoa. There, he was discovered and selected to play the role of Maciste, a muscular slave, in the silent movie classic Cabiria in 1914. As the originator of this role, he went on to play the character for the next 14 years in a series of sequels. Pagano became an international star, and legally changed his name to Maciste. In the 1920s he was one of the most well paid actors in Italy, receiving up to 600.000 lire a year. The actor retired from films in 1929 to marry and raise a family in his home town of Genoa. He died there, aged 68, and is buried on the family estate in Italy.

== Maciste ==
In the role of Maciste, Pagano played a muscular African slave with dark skin who is transformed from his time and place in Roman antiquity into a light-skinned contemporary Italian.

== Selected filmography ==
- Cabiria (1914)
- The Warrior (1916)
- Maciste the Policeman (1918)
- Maciste the Athlete (1918)
- Maciste on Vacation (1921)
- The Revenge of Maciste (1921)
- Maciste and the Silver King's Daughter (1922)
- Maciste and the Javanese (1922)
- Maciste and the Chinese Chest (1923)
- Maciste and Prisoner 51 (1923)
- Emperor Maciste (1924)
- Maciste's American Nephew (1924)
- Maciste in Hell
- Maciste against the Sheik (1926)
- Maciste in the Lion's Cage (1926)
- The Giant of the Dolomites (1927)
- The Courier of Moncenisio (1927)
- The Last Tsars (1928)
- Judith and Holofernes (1929)

== See also ==
- Sword-and-sandal
