= Giovinezza (graduation song) =

Italian song

"Il commiato"

Song
- Language: Italian
- English title: "The Farewell"
- Published: 1909
- Genre: Goliardic hymn
- Composer: Giuseppe Blanc
- Lyricist: Nino Oxilia

Audio sample
- "Giovinezza" (MIDI instrumental): file; help

"Il commiato" ('The farewell'), known by its refrain as "Giovinezza" ('Youth') is an Italian song that is part of the repertoire of goliardic hymns of Italian universities. In vogue in the early twentieth century, the extemporaneous work of Nino Oxilia, who composed its verses out of the blue on a convivial occasion in 1909. Oxilia's text was set to music by Giuseppe Blanc.

Originally widespread among students at the University of Turin, the goliardic song celebrated the end of studies and the impending assumption of adult responsibilities, resulting in the fading of the sweetness of youth.

Originating as a nostalgic student song centered on the theme of the melancholy epilogue of carefree university life, it suffered an unforeseen fate over time, as it was adopted in various contexts that overwhelmed its original goliardic imprint. First adapted in a military context, then in a political and social one, it eventually ended up becoming the fascist "Giovinezza", the anthem of the National Fascist Party.

== Authors ==
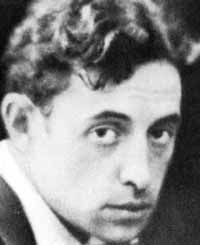
Nino Oxilia (1889–1917), author of the lyrics of the hymn

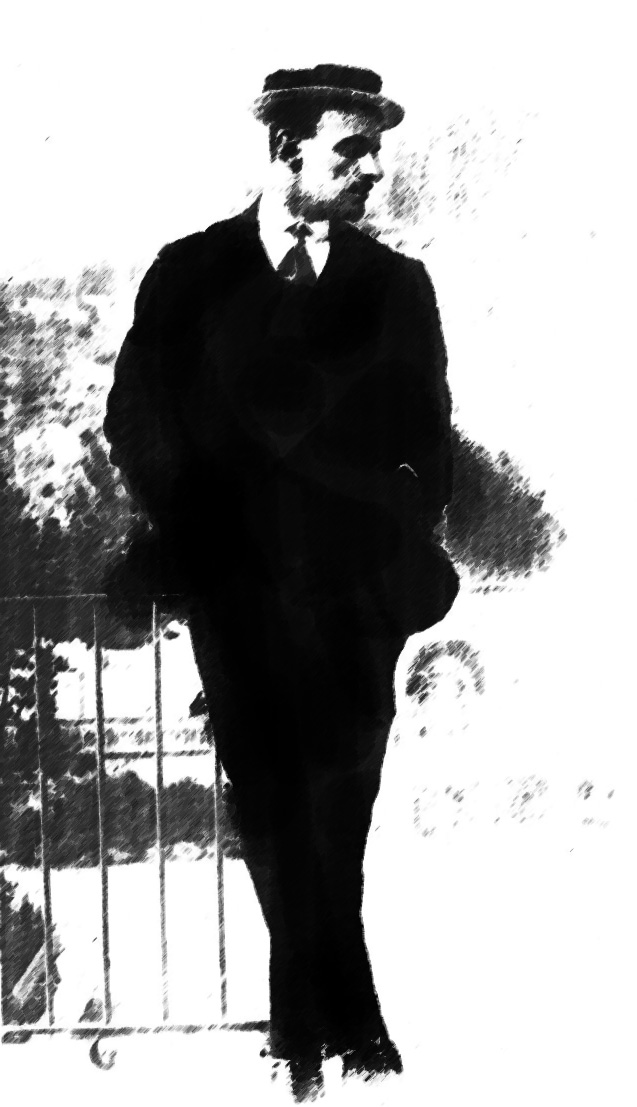
Musician Giuseppe Blanc (1886–1969), in the years before World War I

The author of the text was 19-year-old student Nino Oxilia, a future crepuscular poet, who, along with the writing of the hymn, was known for his celebrated goliardic past: he was, in fact, a prominent member of the A.T.U. (Associazione Torinese Universitaria, later merged into the Corda Fratres) and was, in addition, a fellow member of the Gaja Brigade, in which he attained the title of "cardinal".

A protagonist of the student Belle Époque, Oxilia would meet a young death during World War I on 18 November 1917, on the Monte Grappa line in Veneto, struck by shrapnel on Mount Tomba.

Oxilia's lyrics were set to music by his friend Giuseppe Blanc, a versatile musician and multi-instrumentalist who was a student at the Giuseppe Verdi Music School (later Giuseppe Verdi Conservatory). Blanc, at the time, was an undergraduate student in law, having given up fully pursuing his musical inclinations to comply with the wishes of his parents, who wanted him to start studying law.

== History ==
The song originated in Turin on a May evening in 1909, in Sussembrino's trattoria on Via Po, with the title Il Commiato, as a goliardic song during a farewell party for law students at the University of Turin. It was at the urging of the group of students gathered that Nino Oxilia set out to compose the lyrics of the song on the spur of the moment to celebrate an event, that of graduation, which marked a rite of passage in human life, the end of the carefree life of bohemianism and the transit from adolescence to adult life, with the assumption of professional commitments and responsibilities, a change often marked, for students away from home, by the abandonment of the city and fellow students to return to the province of origin.

In the trattoria, Oxilia was in the company of his musician friend Giuseppe Blanc, who added music to the lyrics, and the song met with considerable approval in Turin's goliardic circles, so much so that it was immediately printed in 150 copies by the students themselves. The publication, for the Turin publishing house Gustavo Gori Editore Di Musica in Piazza Castello 22, featured "a beautiful and emblematic frontispiece" in color by Attilio Mussino, who, in Art Nouveau style, had depicted a farewell scene between a departing student with his graduation diploma rolled up under his arm and "a beautiful and frowning maiden with her face partly covered by a broad hat," to whom the student holds out his hand.

== Themes ==
Oxilia's verses, at once joyous and melancholy, celebrated the end of the bohemian age of studies, which also marked the end of his joys, student loves, and the vigor and swagger of his twenties.

According to a study published in 2013 by Patrizia Deabate, the original version of the hymn was Oxilia's response to a poem written half a century earlier by the Milanese Emilio Praga, a "cursed" poet belonging to the Scapigliatura movement. The Hymn, moreover, would have its earliest roots in the exaltation of the youth of the French Revolution, with its reference to a symbol contained in Eugène Delacroix's famous painting, Liberty Leading the People, housed in the Louvre Museum in Paris.

A thesis reiterated, with further historical and literary references, in the preface to "Canti brevi" by Nino Oxilia, in the 2014 reissue edited by Patrizia Deabate for the series directed by Roberto Rossi Precerutti, Neos Edizioni, Turin.

After the discovery and restoration of the 1918 film Addio giovinezza (Goodbye Youth) in Japan, which was presented at the 2014 Festival del Cinema Ritrovato in Bologna, the connections between the film and the anthem in its transformation from the goliardic version of 1909 to the warlike version of the Arditi of 1917 were identified.

=== Success ===
In 1911 the song was included in the famous operetta Addio giovinezza! (operetta), with a libretto by Sandro Camasio and Nino Oxilia himself, which enjoyed considerable success. This also contributed to the fortune of the hymn, which was also sung among the pavilions of the International Exhibition of Industry and Labor held in Turin that same year.

These were the years when, in turn-of-the-century Turin, incipient industrial development was already delineating a sociological divide; compared to the world of smokestacks and mechanics' factories, the song represented a counter-song expression of a city anchored in its Risorgimento soul, the Savoyan society "of limited but secure horizons, of life without eagerness, of the small and serene things sung with regret by Guido Gozzano."

==== Subsequent rearrangements ====
The hymn's success is also evidenced by subsequent remakes: reworked in 1911, it was adopted as the official anthem of the Alpini.

When the author died in the war in 1917, it ended up being turned into an anthem of the Arditi, then of the anti-fascist Arditi del Popolo, then of the fascist women, then, again, into an anthem of the fascist squadrismo. Later, with changes to the text made by Salvator Gotta, it became "Giovinezza", then "Triumphal Anthem of the National Fascist Party" and, finally, "Anthem of the Italian Social Republic".

Nothing in Oxilia's verses could hint or give away the sense of the social and political symbolism with which the students' nostalgic hymn would be loaded with various interventions over time. The succession of these interventions, with the inclusion of symbols and historical references, makes it possible to follow the very evolution, in a social and political sense, of Italian fascism.

The Alma mater of the Quezon National High School also reused the melody of this song.

== Lyrics ==
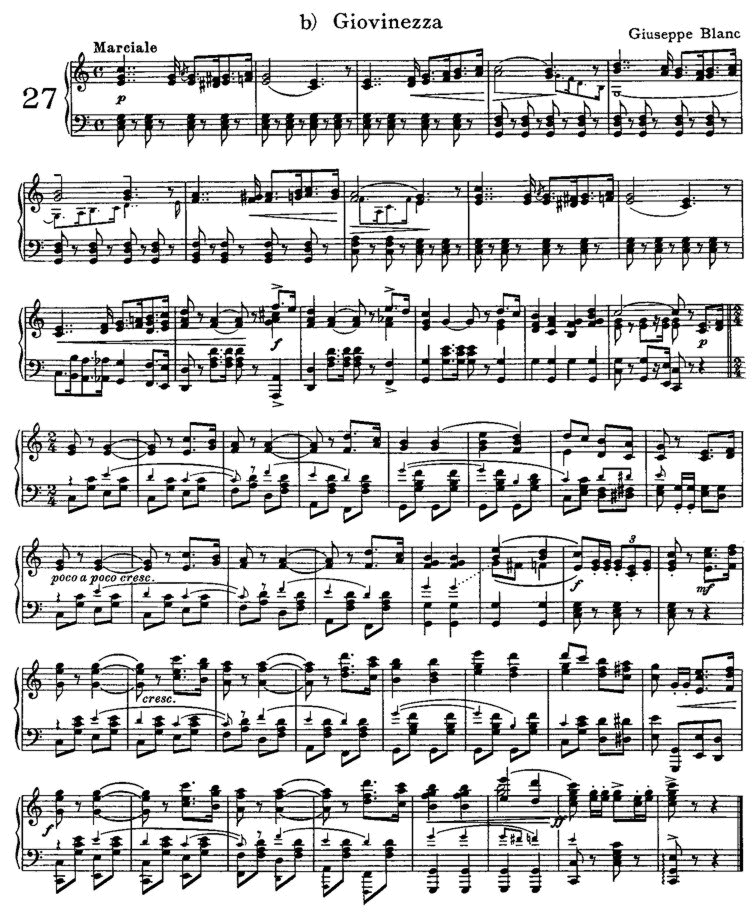
Score of the hymn (Giuseppe Blanc)

Italian lyrics	Italian IPA transcription (Note: See Help:IPA/Italian and Italian phonology.)	English translation
Son finiti i giorni lieti, degli studi e degli amori, o compagni in alto i cuori, il passato salutiamo. È la vita una battaglia, e il cammino irto d'inganni, ma siam forti: abbiam vent'anni, l'avvenire non temiam... Giovinezza, giovinezza, Primavera di bellezza, della vita nell'asprezza, il tuo canto squilla e va... Stretti stretti sotto braccio, d'una timida sdegnosa, trecce bionde, labbra rosa, occhi azzurri come il mare. Ricordate in Primavera, tra le verdi ombre dei tigli, nei crepuscoli vermigli, i fantastici vagar?... Giovinezza, giovinezza, Primavera di bellezza, della vita nell'asprezza, il tuo canto squilla e va... Salve o nostra adolescenza, te commossi salutiamo: per la vita ce ne andiamo, il tuo riso cesserà. Ma se un dì venisse un grido, dei fratelli non redenti, con la morte, sorridenti, il nemico ci vedrà! Giovinezza, giovinezza, Primavera di bellezza, della vita nell'asprezza, il tuo canto squilla e va!	ˈsoɱ fiˈniːti i ˈdʒorni ˈljeːti ˈdeʎʎi ˈstuːdi e ˈdeʎʎ(i) aˈmoːri o komˈpaɲɲi in ˈalto i ˈkwɔːri il pasˈsaːto saluˈtjaːmo ɛ la ˈviːta ˈuːna batˈtaʎʎa e il kamˈmiːno ˈirto diŋˈɡanni ma ˈsjaɱ ˈfɔrti abˈbjaɱ ˌvenˈtanni lavveˈniːre non teˈmjam dʒoviˈnettsa dʒoviˈnettsa primaˈveːra di belˈlettsa ˈdella ˈviːta ˌnellaˈsprettsa il two ˈkanto ˈskwilla e va ˈstretti ˈstretti ˈsotto ˈbrattʃo ˈduːna ˈtiːmida zdeɲˈɲoːza ˈtrettʃe ˈbjonde ˈlabbra ˈrɔːza ˈɔkki adˈdzurri ˈkoːme il ˈmaːre rikorˈdaːre im primaˈveːra tra le ˈverdi ˈombre dei ˈtiʎʎi nei kreˈpuːskoli verˈmiʎʎi i fanˈtaːstitʃi vaˈɡar dʒoviˈnettsa dʒoviˈnettsa primaˈveːra di belˈlettsa ˈdella ˈviːta ˌnellaˈsprettsa il two ˈkanto ˈskwilla e va ˈsalve o ˈnɔːstra adoleˈʃɛntsa te komˈmɔssi saluˈtjaːmo per la ˈviːta tʃe ne anˈdjaːmo il two ˈriːzo tʃesseˈra ma se un di veˈnisse uŋ ˈɡriːdo dei fraˈtɛlli noŋ reˈdɛnti koŋ la ˈmɔrte sorriˈdɛnti il neˈmiːko tʃi veˈdra dʒoviˈnettsa dʒoviˈnettsa primaˈveːra di belˈlettsa ˈdella ˈviːta ˌnellaˈsprettsa il two ˈkanto ˈskwilla e va	The happy days are over, of studies and of love, o companions in high hearts, the past we salute. Life is a battle, a path fraught with deceptions, but we are strong: we are twenty years old, the future we fear not... Youth, youth, Spring of beauty, in the hardship of life, your song rings and goes... Held tightly under the arm, of a shy disdainful one, blonde braids, pink lips, eyes blue like the sea. Do you remember in Spring, among the green shadows of lime trees, in the vermilion twilight, the fantastic wanderings?... Youth, youth, Spring of beauty, in the hardship of life, your song rings and goes... Hail to our adolescence, we bid you farewell: for life we depart, thy laughter shall cease. But if one day there comes a cry, of the unredeemed brothers, with death, smiling, the enemy will see us! Youth, youth, Spring of beauty, in the hardship of life, your song rings and goes!

=== Variations ===
Some versions of the song have slight differences in text. These include:

Verse 1:

Italian lyrics	Italian IPA transcription	English translation
Son finiti i tempi lieti degli studi e degli amori; o compagni in alto i cuori, il passato salutiam.	ˈsoɱ fiˈniːti i ˈtɛmpi ˈljɛːti deʎʎi ˈstuːdj e ddeʎʎ aˈmoːri o komˈpaɲɲi in ˈalto i ˈkwɔːri il pasˈsaːto saluˈtjam	The happy times are over of studies and of love; o companions in high hearts, the past we salute.

Verse 4:

Italian lyrics	Italian IPA transcription	English translation
Stretti stretti sotto braccio d'una piccola sdegnosa, trecce bionde, labbra rosa, occhi azzurri come il mar.	ˈstretti ˈstretti ˈsotto ˈbrattʃo ˈduːna ˈpikkola zdeɲˈɲoːsa ˈtrettʃe ˈbjonde ˈlabbra ˈrɔːza ˈɔkkj adˈdzurri ˈkoːme il ˈmar	Held tightly under the arm of a little disdainful one, blonde braids, pink lips, eyes blue like the sea.

Verse 5 (lines 2 and 3 are switched):

Italian lyrics	Italian IPA transcription	English translation
Ricordate in primavera i crepuscoli vermigli tra le verdi ombre dei tigli i fantastici vagar.	rikorˈdaːte im primaˈvɛːra i kreˈpuskoli verˈmiʎʎi tra lle ˈverdj ˈombre dei ˈtiʎʎi i fanˈtastitʃi vaˈɡar	Remembering in spring the vermilion twilight among the green shadows of lime trees the fantastic wanderings.

Verse 8:

Italian lyrics	Italian IPA transcription	English translation
Ma se un dì udremo un grido dei fratelli non redenti alla morte sorridenti il nemico ci vedrà.	ma sse un ˈdi uˈdreːmo uŋ ˈɡriːdo dei fraˈtɛlli non reˈdɛnti alla ˈmɔrte sorriˈdɛnti il neˈmiːko tʃi veˈdra	But if one day there we will hear a cry of the unredeemed brothers to death smiling the enemy will see us.
