= Goodbye Youth =

Goodbye Youth (Italian: Addio, giovinezza!) may refer to:

- Goodbye Youth (play), a 1911 work by Nino Oxilia and Sandro Camasio
- Goodbye Youth (1918 film), an Italian silent film
- Goodbye Youth (1927 film), an Italian silent film
- Goodbye Youth (1940 film), an Italian film
