= Goodbye Youth (1927 film) =

1927 film directed by Augusto Genina

- Directed by: Augusto Genina
- Written by: Sandro Camasio (play); Nino Oxilia (play); Luciano Doria; Augusto Genina
- Starring: Walter Slezak; Elena Sangro; Carmen Boni
- Cinematography: Antonio Martini; Carlo Montuori
- Production company: Genina Film
- Release date: 31 January 1927
- Running time: 87 minutes
- Country: Italy
- Language: Italian

Goodbye Youth (Italian: Addio giovinezza!) is a 1927 Italian silent drama film directed by Augusto Genina and starring Walter Slezak, Elena Sangro and Carmen Boni. The film was adapted from the 1911 play of the same name by Nino Oxilia and Sandro Camasio.

The film is set in Turin at the beginning of the twentieth century, where a student begins a romance with a seamstress Dorina. However, he is lured away by a sophisticated older woman leaving Dorina distressed. Genina had previously directed an earlier version of the play in 1918. It was remade by Ferdinando Maria Poggioli as a sound film of the same title in 1940.

== Cast ==
- Carmen Boni as Dorina
- Walter Slezak
- Elena Sangro
- Augusto Bandini
- Carla Bartheel
- Gemma De Ferrari

== Bibliography ==
- Goble, Alan. The Complete Index to Literary Sources in Film. Walter de Gruyter, 1999.
