= Nino Oxilia =

Italian playwright, screenwriter and film director

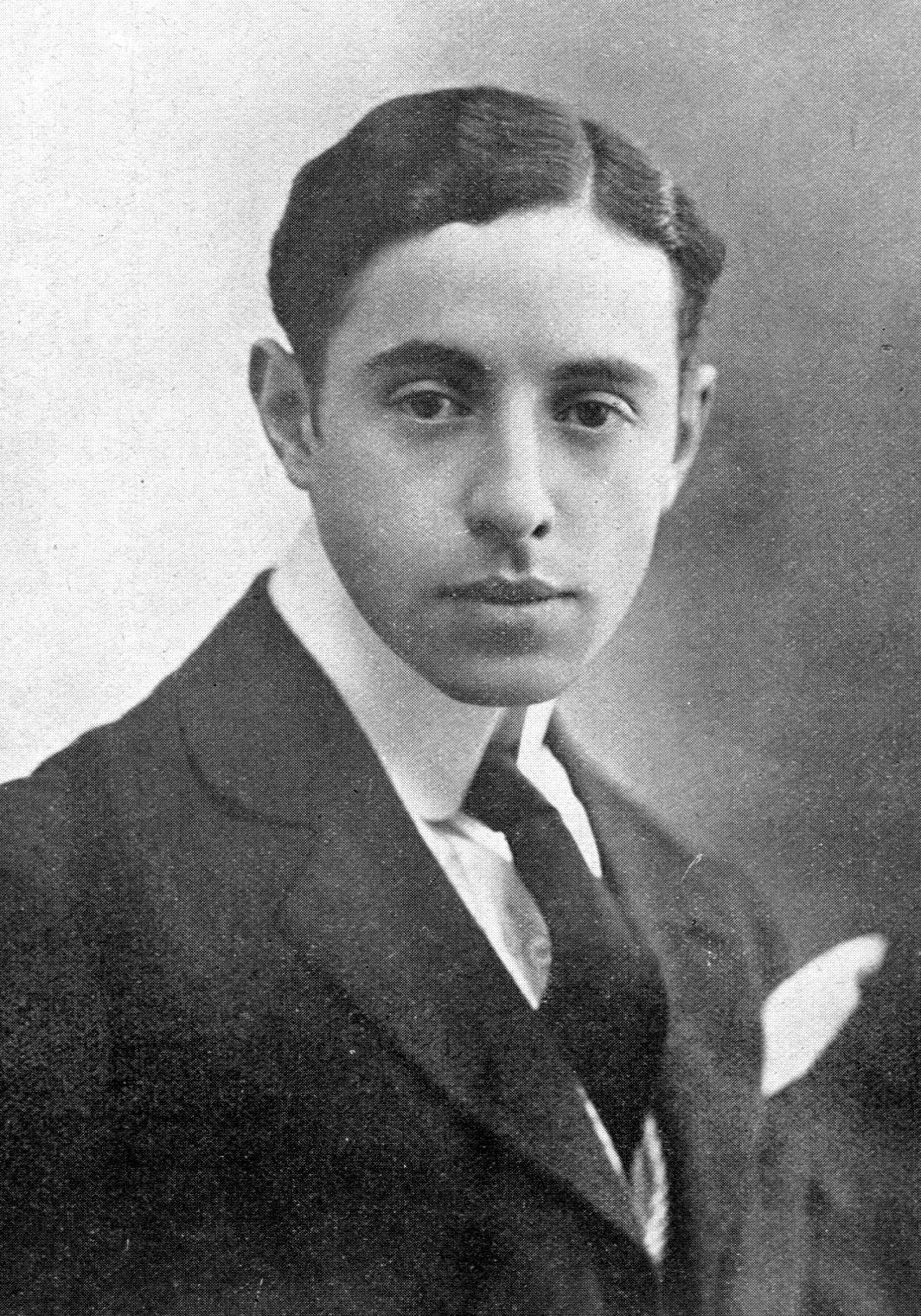
- Oxilia c. 1914
- Born: Angelo Agostino Adolfo Oxilia; 13 November 1889; Turin, Piedmont, Kingdom of Italy
- Died: 18 November 1917 (aged 28); Monte Grappa, Veneto, Kingdom of Italy
- Occupations: Director, screenwriter, poet, playwright
- Years active: 1912–1917 (film)
- Notable work: Rapsodia Satanica

Signature
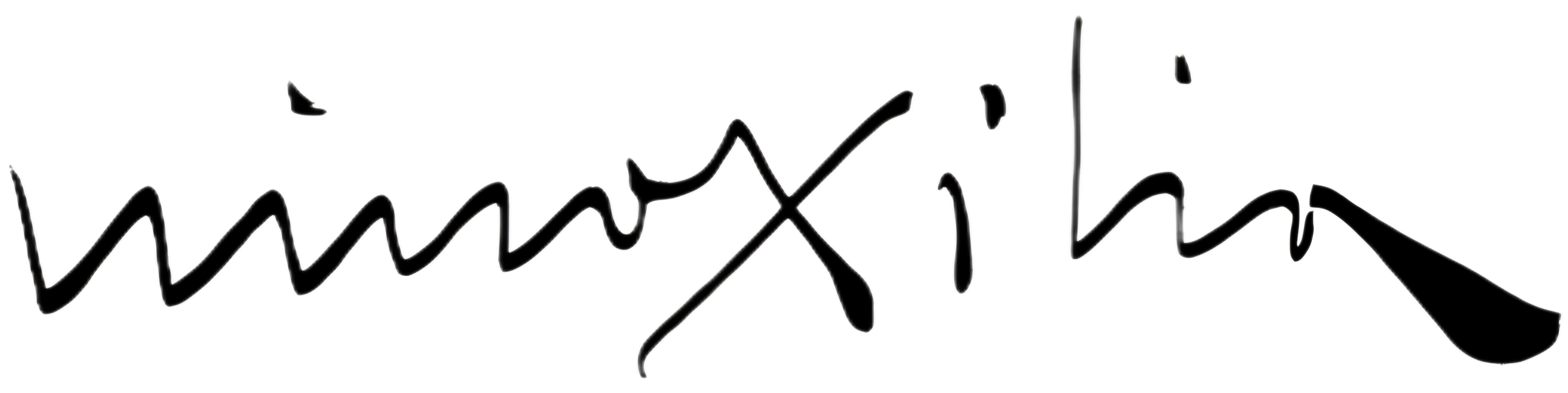

Nino Oxilia (13 November 1889 – 18 November 1917) was an Italian playwright, screenwriter and film director. His 1911 play Goodbye Youth, written with Sandro Camasio, was turned into several films. He also wrote the first lyrics for the song "Giovinezza" in 1909. He died in combat on the Italian Front during the First World War.

== Biography ==
=== Early life and education ===
Nino Oxilia was born in Turin on 13 November 1889 to Nicolò and Giovanna. He was the fourth of five siblings. His older brother, Andrea Felice Oxilia, was a poet who translated Greek lyric poetry, while his sister, Anna, was the wife of the painter Cesare Maggi.

Oxilia attended the Liceo classico Cavour in Turin, where his professors included the noted classicist Vincenzo Ussani. After graduating from high school, he enrolled at the University of Turin, where he studied Law for two years without graduating. While there, he attended Arturo Graf's lectures on literary history. In 1907, he joined the editorial staff of the newspaper Gazzetta di Torino.

=== Early literary career ===
During this period, Oxilia became friends with several leading Turinese intellectuals, including Salvator Gotta, Guido Gozzano and Amalia Guglielminetti. In 1908, Oxilia and his friend Sandro Camasio wrote the three-act comedy La Zingara. The play premiered at the Teatro Carignano in Turin on 12 November 1909 and went on to be performed in Genoa and Milan.

That same year, Oxilia published his debut poetry collection, Canti brevi. The collection comprised 61 untitled pieces in a style akin to that of contemporary Crepuscular poets such as Gozzano. In 1909, Oxilia composed the song Il Commiato (The farewell), which was set to music by Giuseppe Blanc, a fellow law student. Originally widespread among students at the University of Turin, the goliardic song celebrated the end of studies and the impending assumption of adult responsibilities, resulting in the fading of the sweetness of youth. The song became immensely popular among Italian soldiers during the First World War. With modified lyrics, it became known as the Inno degli Arditi (Hymn of the Arditi, an elite special force of the Italian Royal Army). The hymn was further popularised by Gabriele D'Annunzio's mass rallies in Fiume, and was adopted by fascism under the title Giovinezza.

The following year, Oxilia, who had not abandoned his journalistic career, left the Gazzetta di Torino to join Il Momento, a progressive Catholic newspaper founded in 1903. The literary partnership between Oxilia and Camasio, reached its zenith with the three-act comedy Addio giovinezza! (Goodbye Youth), which premiered on 27 March 1911 at the Teatro Manzoni in Milan.

The protagonist, penniless Mario, who has come from the provinces to study law and is close to graduation, finds himself torn between his love for the candid milliner Dorina and his attraction to the mysterious Elena. Imbued with nostalgia for lost youth, the comedy was an immense success. First published in 1914 with a preface by Salvator Gotta, it was adapted for the screen several times in the following years.

=== Cinema ===
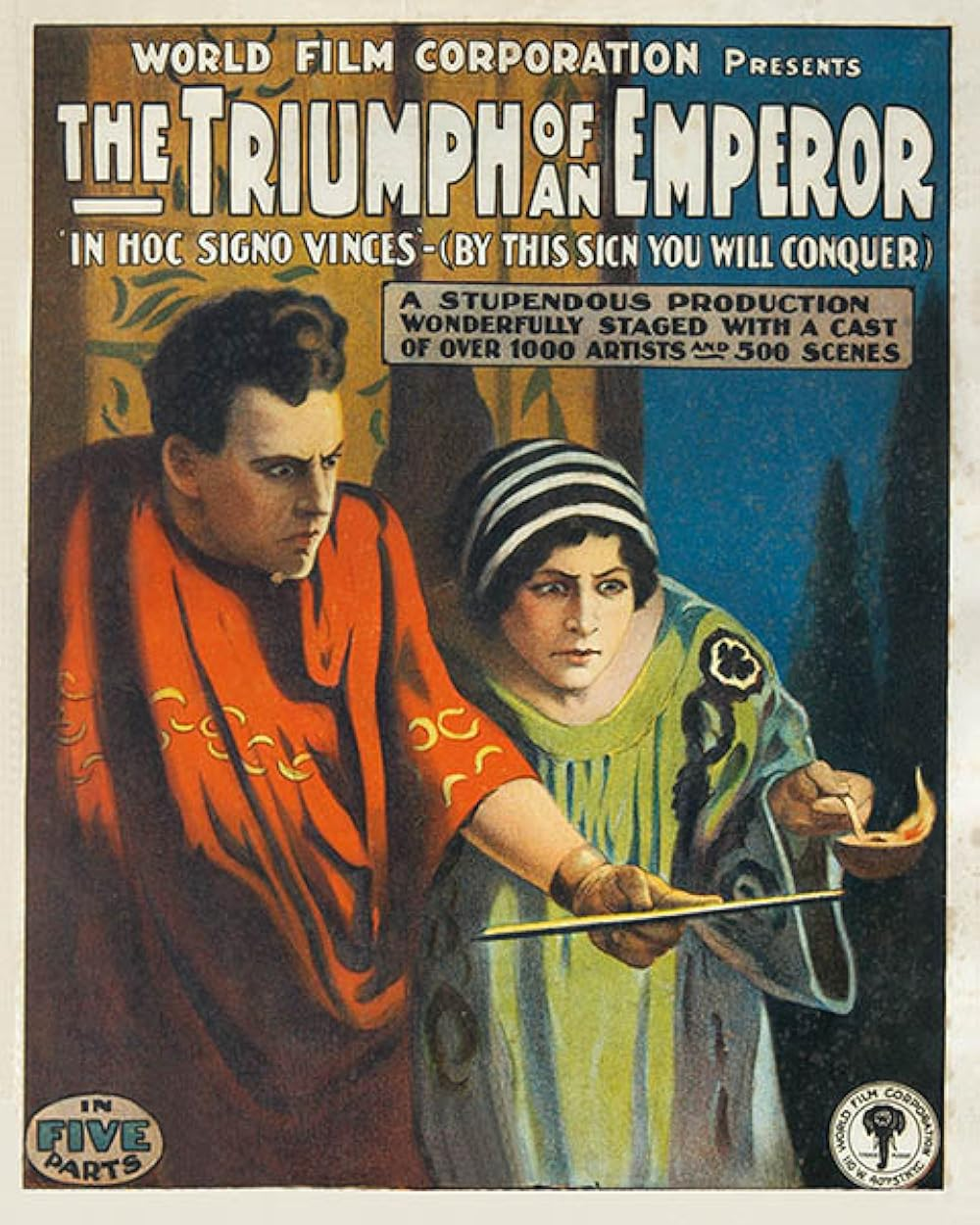
Poster to the U.S. theatrical release of The Triumph of an Emperor

In 1912, Oxilia began to take an interest in the new medium of cinema. He initially worked as an artistic advisor at Savoia Film, before becoming an assistant director under Roberto Danesi on Vampe di gelosia (1912), La falsa strada, and Lo scherno feroce (both 1913). In 1913, he was also assistant director to Ubaldo Maria Del Colle on Giovanna d'Arco and to Oreste Mentasti on Il cadavere vivente. Maria Jacobini, who would later become his fiancée, starred in all of these films. In collaboration with Camasio, he also directed the film Addio, giovinezza!, based on the 1911 play of the same name. It was produced by Itala Film, which the following year produced Giovanni Pastrone’s celebrated historical epic Cabiria. The film starred Lidia and Letizia Quaranta, as well as Amerigo Manzini. In 1913 Oxilia directed the historical epic The Triumph of an Emperor (In Hoc Signo Vinces), a significant example of early Italian historical spectacles that were popular in the 1910s. Distributed internationally by the French company Éclair, the film enjoyed good commercial success worldwide.

Oxilia wrote both the story and the screenplay for Flower of Evil (1915), directed by Carmine Gallone and starring Lyda Borelli and Augusto Poggioli. In 1917, Oxilia directed Rapsodia Satanica, one of the earliest examples of Italian fantasy cinema. Based on a poem by Fausto Maria Martini, the film tells the story of Alba d'Oltrevita (played by Lyda Borelli), an old woman who makes a pact with Mephistopheles (played by Giulio Bazzini) to regain her lost youth. Having regained her youth in exchange for an eternal renunciation of love, Alba is courted by two brothers, courted by two brothers, Tristano (played by Andrea Habay) and Sergio (played by Giovanni Cinni). She contemptuously rejects the former's advances, prompting him to kill himself in despair. She then falls in love with the latter and intends to marry him, but she is condemned to old age once again for breaking the pact with the devil. Rapsodia Satanica was Oxilia's most successful work. One of the most stylish Italian melodramas produced in the early days of silent film, it helped to establish the country's film industry on the world stage. Pietro Mascagni composed the only film score of his career for this film, and conducted the premiere performance in July 1917.

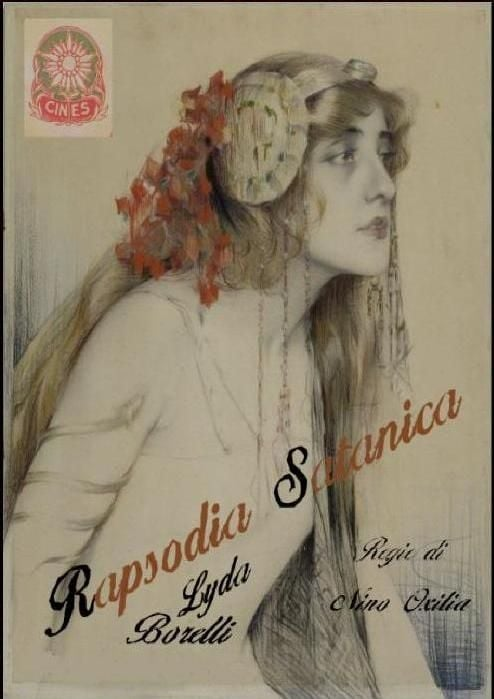
Advertising poster of Rapsodia Satanica

After moving to Rome and starting work at the film company Cines, Oxilia wrote another comedy, this time on his own: La donna e lo specchio. Published in the literary magazine Comoedia in 1924, the play was a resounding flop, marking his final departure from the stage. He then returned to the film industry, temporarily leaving Cines for Celio Film.

=== World War I and death ===
At the outbreak of World War I, Oxilia volunteered and was appointed Second Lieutenant in the 3rd Artillery Regiment. Called up by the Special Propaganda Office of the Ministry of the Navy, he collaborated with the film department to produce two documentaries between late 1916 and 1917: Dall’Adriatico all’Egeo. Sbarco delle forze italiane in Albania and Dalla ritirata d’Albania alle trincee di Macedonia. In 1917, during a period of leave, he directed the film L’uomo in Frak, starring Berta Nelson and Augusto Poggioli.

Oxilia died on 18 November when the battery he was leading was hit by an Austrian shell on the slopes of Mount Tomba. His body was never recovered.

== Legacy ==
In 2006, the French-German TV channel Arte restored Oxilia's masterpiece, Rapsodia Satanica and Staatsphilharmonie Rheinland-Pfalz, conducted by Frank Strobel recorded Mascagni's score.

In 2014, Amsterdam's Eye Filmmuseum restored Oxilia's 1914 film Blue Blood, starring the diva Francesca Bertini. The restored film was released on DVD by Cineteca Bologna in collaboration with Eye. The DVD also features a documentary by Giovanni Lasi about Oxilia's life and work.

== Selected filmography ==
Year	Title	Preservation status
1913	The Triumph of an Emperor	EYE Film Institute Netherlands, Filmoteca de Galica and Cineteca del Friuli
1913	Il velo d'Iside	Lost
1913	Il cadavere vivente	Lost
1913	Giovanna d'Arco	Lost
1914	La monella	Lost
1914	L'ammiraglia	Lost
1914	Il focolare domestico	Public domain; EYE Film Institute Netherlands
1914	Retaggio d'odio	Lost
1914	Veli di giovinezza	Lost
1914	Blue Blood	Public domain; EYE Film Institute Netherlands
1915	Per amore di Jenny	Public domain
1915	Ananke	Lost
1915	Papà	Public domain
1915	Nella fornace	Lost
1915	Il sottomarino n. 27	Lost
1916	L'Italia s'è desta!	Lost
1916	Odio che ride	Lost
1917	Rapsodia Satanica	Public domain; Swiss Film Archive, Cineteca di Bologna
1917	L'uomo in frak	Lost

== Bibliography ==
- Brunetta, Gian Piero (1991). Cent'anni di cinema italiano. Roma-Bari: Laterza. ISBN 978-8842038511.
- Moliterno, Gino (2009). The A to Z of Italian Cinema. Lanham, Maryland: Scarecrow Press. ISBN 978-0810870598.
