= Goodbye Youth (1940 film) =

- Directed by: Ferdinando Maria Poggioli
- Written by: Nino Oxilia (play); Sandro Camasio (play); Giacomo De Benedetti; Salvatore Gotta; Ferdinando Maria Poggioli
- Starring: María Denis; Adriano Rimoldi; Clara Calamai; Carlo Campanini
- Cinematography: Carlo Montuori
- Edited by: Ferdinando Maria Poggioli
- Music by: Giuseppe Blanc; Enzo Masetti
- Production company: ICI
- Distributed by: Variety Distribution
- Release date: 24 December 1940
- Running time: 94 minutes
- Country: Italy
- Language: Italian

Goodbye Youth (Italian: Addio, giovinezza!) is a 1940 Italian "white-telephones" drama film directed by Ferdinando Maria Poggioli and starring María Denis, Adriano Rimoldi and Clara Calamai. The film was adapted from the 1911 play of the same name by Nino Oxilia and Sandro Camasio, which had been adapted into films on three previous occasions. The film was a breakthrough role for Calamai who emerged as a leading star of Italian cinema during the 1940s. It was made at the Cinecittà studios in Rome and the Fert Studios in Turin.

== Synopsis ==
The film is set in Turin at the beginning of the twentieth century, where a student (Rimoldi) begins a romance with a seamstress Dorina (Denis). However, he is lured away by a sophisticated older woman (Calamai) to Dorina's distress.

== Cast ==
- María Denis as Dorina
- Adriano Rimoldi as Mario
- Clara Calamai as Elena
- Carlo Campanini as Leone
- Bianca Della Corte as Emma
- Carlo Minello as Carlo
- Paolo Carlini as Pino
- Bella Starace Sainati as La madre di Dorina
- Aldo Fiorelli as Ernesto
- Mario Giannini as Giovanni
- Umberto Bonsignori as Tito
- Mario Casaleggio as Il padre di Mario
- Nuccia Robella as La madre di Mario
- Vera Carmi as La fidanzata di Giovanni
- Franca Volpini as La fidanzata di Ernesto
- Arturo Bragaglia as Marco, il ciabattino
- Walter Grant as L'anziano signore, amante di Elena
- Piera Romati as Una ragazza al bar
- Maria-Pia Vivaldi as Un'altra ragazza al bar

== See also ==
- Goodbye Youth (1918)
- Goodbye Youth (1927)

== Bibliography ==
- Gundle, Stephen. Mussolini's Dream Factory: Film Stardom in Fascist Italy. Berghahn Books, 2013.
