= Corazzini =

Corazzini is an Italian surname. Notable people with the surname include:

- Carl Corazzini (born 1979), American ice hockey player
- Sergio Corazzini (1886–1907), Italian poet

== See also ==
- Corazzo
