= Vera Carmi =

Italian actress (1914–1969)

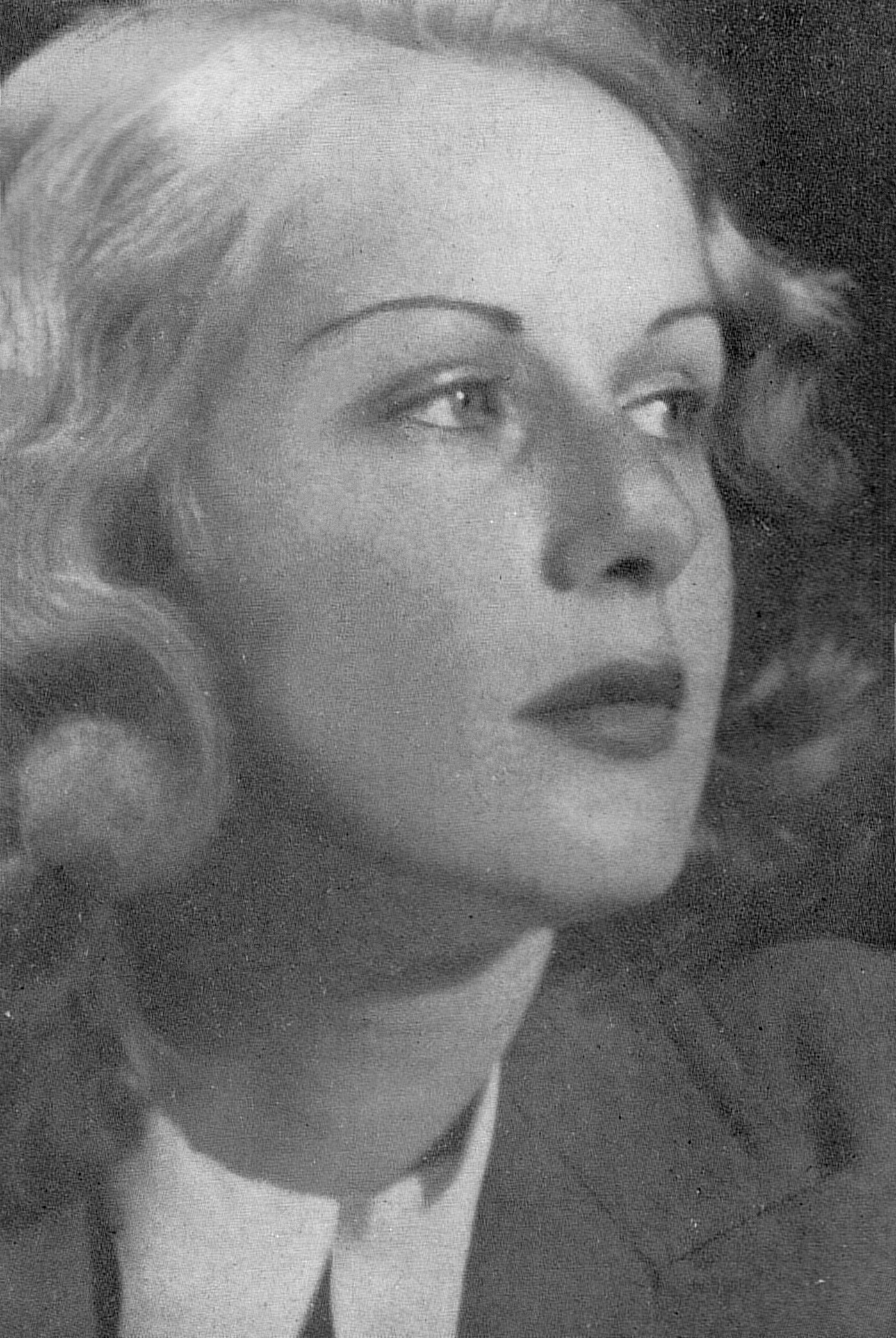
- Carmi in 1941
- Born: Virginia Doglioli; 23 November 1914; Turin, Kingdom of Italy
- Died: 6 September 1969 (aged 54); Rome, Italy
- Other name: Vera Del Monte
- Occupation: Actress
- Years active: 1940–1956

Vera Carmi (23 November 1914 – 6 September 1969) was an Italian film actress. She appeared in more than 50 films between 1940 and 1956.

== Life and career ==
Carmi was born Virginia Doglioli in Turin. After being spotted by the director Ferdinando Maria Poggioli in a beauty contest, she made her film debut in 1940, in a supporting role in Poggioli's Goodbye Youth and in a short time she became one of the most requested actresses in the Telefoni Bianchi genre.

After the war she got critical acclaim for a number of dramatic performances, notably Mario Soldati's His Young Wife and Luciano Emmer's Sunday in August. She was also very active on stage. Gradually cast in less important roles, she eventually retired in the second half of the 1950s.

Carmi was the first wife of the football player Aldo Giuseppe Borel.

== Partial filmography ==
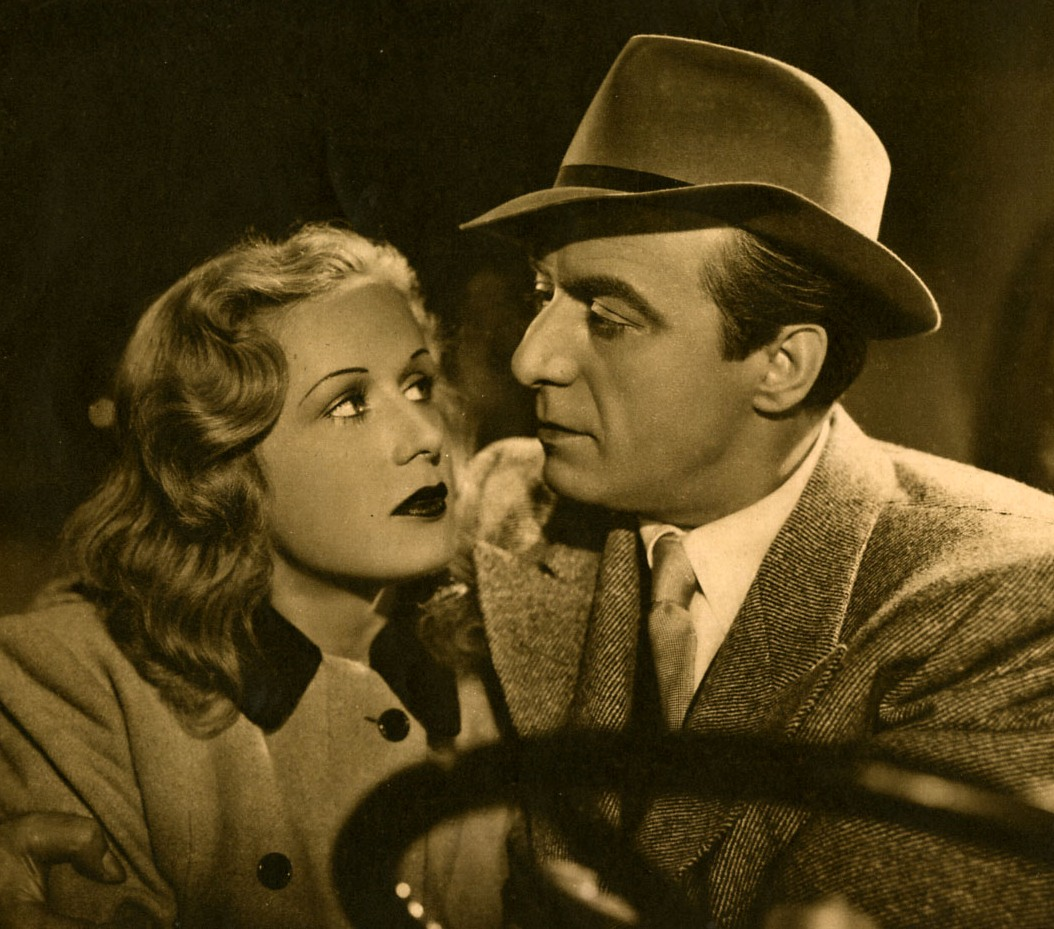
Carmi with Fosco Giachetti in Labbra serrate (1942)

- Goodbye Youth (1940) - La fidanzata di Giovanni
- A Husband for the Month of April (1941) - La fioraia
- Il cavaliere senza nome (1941) - Bianca
- Villa da vendere (1941) - Lidia
- L'amore canta (1941) - Marta Della Rocca
- La fortuna viene dal cielo (1942) - Anna Illes
- Once a Week (1942) - Laura Macrè - sua fanciulla
- Sealed Lips (1942) - Anna Massani
- Happy Days (1942) - Nietta
- Redemption (1943) - Maria
- Two Hearts Among the Beasts (1943) - Laura Berti
- Lively Teresa (1943) - Luisa, la manicure
- Il fidanzato di mia moglie (1943) - Renata Sarti
- La signora in nero (1943) - Bianca Maria De Ritis
- Anything for a Song (1943) - La fanciulla
- The Za-Bum Circus (1944) - (segment "Galop finale al circo")
- Finalmente sì (1944) - Silvia
- The Ten Commandments (1945) - (segment "Onora il padre e la madre")
- His Young Wife (1945) - Madama Rosa Travet
- 07... Tassì (1945) - L'attrice
- O sole mio (1946) - Clara, la spia
- The Models of Margutta (1946) - Paola
- Tempesta d'anime (1946)
- Trepidazione (1946)
- Christmas at Camp 119 (1947) - La maestrina torinese
- Farewell, My Beautiful Naples (1947) - Roberta Sullivan
- Sono io l'assassino (1948)
- Cab Number 13 (1948) - Jeanne Herblet (segments "Delitto" & "Castigo")
- L'isola di Montecristo (1948) - Elena Fabbri
- How I Lost the War (1948) - Gemma
- Sunday in August (1950) - Adriana
- The Two Sisters (1950) - Franca
- Milano miliardaria (1951) - Paola
- My Heart Sings (1951) - Madre di Enrico
- Black Feathers (1952) - Catina Cossutti
- The Blind Woman of Sorrento (1953) - Elena Viscardi
- Die Tochter der Kompanie (1953)
- Buon viaggio pover'uomo (1953) - Teresa
- I Always Loved You (1953) - Sister Anna
- The Daughter of the Regiment (1953) - moglie di Carlo
- Matrimonial Agency (1953) - Luisa
- It Takes Two to Sin in Love (1954) - Bianca Giorgi
- Appassionatamente (1954) - Paola
- Concert of Intrigue (1954) - Capo infermiere
- Ho pianto per te! (1954)
- Trieste cantico d'amore (1954) - Anna di Sant'Elmo
- Amici per la pelle (1955) - La madre di Mario
- La ladra (1955) - Signora Barenghi
- Revelation (1955) - Elena Ulianova, sorella di Nadia
- Mai ti scorderò (1956) - La padrona della trattoria
- I miliardari (1956) - Segretaria di Ferri
