= Rapsodia Satanica =

1915 Italian silent film

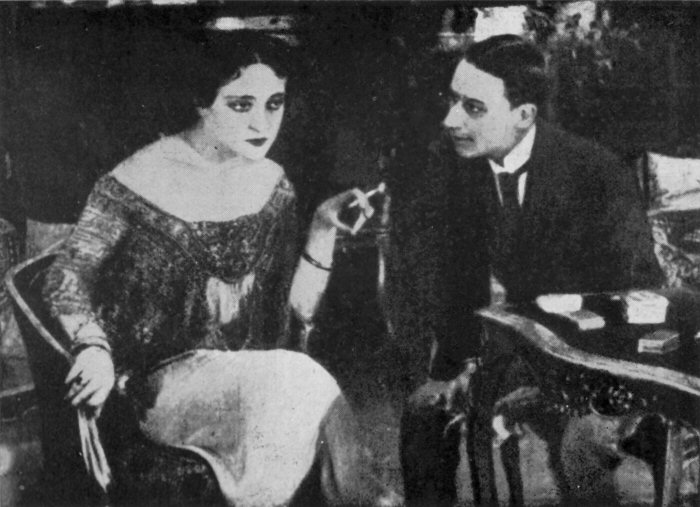
- Directed by: Nino Oxilia
- Based on: Poems by Fausto Maria Martini
- Starring: Lyda Borelli; Andrea Habay; Ugo Bazzini; Giovanni Cini
- Music by: Pietro Mascagni
- Release date: 1915
- Country: Italy
- Language: Silent (Italian intertitles)

Rapsodia satanica

Rapsodia Satanica ('Satanic Rhapsody') is a 1915 Italian silent film directed by Nino Oxilia featuring Lyda Borelli in a female version of Faust based on poems by Fausto Maria Martini. Pietro Mascagni wrote his only film music for the film and conducted the first performance in July 1917. Mascagni was keen to take commission for the film music due to the financial burden of supporting two brothers who were unwell.

The French-German TV channel Arte restored the film in 2006 and Staatsphilharmonie Rheinland-Pfalz, conducted by Frank Strobel recorded Mascagni's score.

== Cast ==
- Lyda Borelli as Contessa Alba d'Oltrevita
- Andrea Habay as Tristano
- Ugo Bazzini as Mephisto
- Giovanni Cini as Sergio

== Plot ==
Elderly Countess Alba d'Oltrevita hosts a party in her castle, but remains behind after the guests depart, mourning her lost youth. Mephistopheles, depicted in a painting, emerges and offers her renewed youth on the condition that she never falls in love again. Alba accepts.

As a young woman, Alba is courted by two brothers, Tristano and Sergio. Although she rejects Sergio, she falls in love with Tristano. When Tristano kisses her, Sergio, distraught, commits suicide. Tristano, overwhelmed with guilt, leaves.

In the aftermath, Alba isolates herself in the castle, consumed by her feelings for Tristano. Mephistopheles tells her that Tristano rides past the mountains each night, prompting her to prepare the castle to receive him. Expecting his arrival, she instead encounters Mephistopheles, who restores her old age as punishment for breaking her vow. Alba gazes at her reflection in a pond and dies.

== Themes ==
Rapsodia Satanica reimagines the Faust myth with a female protagonist, Alba d'Oltrevita. Unlike traditional versions, which typically center on a male scholar, the film frames the narrative through a woman's pact with Mephistopheles.

== Reception ==
Anthony Kobal described Rapsodia Satanica as "one of the finest achievements of the early Italian cinema" and "one of the summits of what was later called the tail coat film." Other critics considered it an "original film adaptation of the 'Faust' legend", noting that Mascagni drew inspiration from Wagner's Tristan for the film score.
