= Blue Blood (1914 film) =

- Italian: Sangue blu
- Directed by: Nino Oxilia
- Written by: Guglielmo Zorzi
- Starring: Francesca Bertini; Amedeo Ciaffi; Anna Cipriani
- Cinematography: Giorgio Ricci
- Production company: Celio Film
- Distributed by: Celio Film
- Release date: September 1914
- Running time: 55 minutes
- Country: Italy
- Languages: Silent; Italian intertitles

Blue Blood (Italian:Sangue blu) is a 1914 Italian silent drama film directed by Nino Oxilia and starring Francesca Bertini, Amedeo Ciaffi and Anna Cipriani.

== Cast ==
- Francesca Bertini as Princess of Monte Cabello
- Amedeo Ciaffi
- Anna Cipriani as Diana
- Angelo Gallina
- Andrea Habay
- Fulvia Perini as Contessa Simone de la Croix
- Elvira Radaelli
