= The Confessions of a Woman =

1928 film directed by Amleto Palermi

- Directed by: Amleto Palermi
- Written by: Nino Maccarones
- Cinematography: Fernando Risi
- Production company: S.A.C.I.
- Distributed by: S.A.C.I.
- Release date: November 1928
- Running time: 148 minutes
- Country: Italy
- Languages: Silent; Italian intertitles

The Confessions of a Woman (Italian: Le confessioni di una donna) is a 1928 Italian silent drama film directed by Amleto Palermi. The film relates a woman falling into high-class prostitution, and her eventual redemption. It is set in Palermo.

== Cast ==
- Augusto Bandini
- Maria Catalano
- Gemma De Ferrari
- Americo De Giorgio
- Enrica Fantis
- Pina Marini
- Valentina Negri
- Renato Nirvana
- Filippo Ricci
- Luigi Serventi

== Bibliography ==
- Bayman, Louis. Directory of World Cinema: Italy. Intellect Books, 2011.
