= Fernando Risi =

Italian cinematographer

- Born: 20 October 1890; Rome, Lazio, Kingdom of Italy
- Occupation: Cinematographer
- Years active: 1923–1954

Fernando Risi was an Italian cinematographer.

== Selected filmography ==
- The Confessions of a Woman (1928)
- Queen of the Night (1931)
- Television (1931)
- The Doctor's Secret (1931)
- No Man's Land (1939)
- Antonio Meucci (1940)
- Saint John, the Beheaded (1940)
- The Brambilla Family Go on Holiday (1941)
- The Beggar's Daughter (1950)
- Beauties on Bicycles (1951)
- Black Feathers (1952)
- The Phantom Musketeer (1952)
- If You Won a Hundred Million (1953)

== Bibliography ==
- Waldman, Harry. Missing Reels: Lost Films of American and European Cinema. McFarland, 2000.
