= Corrado Govoni =

Italian poet

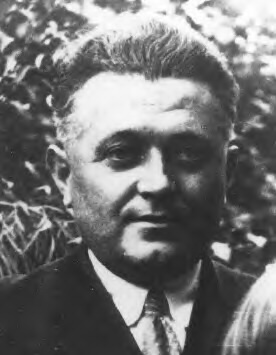

Corrado Govoni (Tàmara, Copparo, 29 October 1884 – Lido dei Pini, 20 October 1965). was an Italian poet. His work dealt with modern urban representations, the states of memory, nostalgia, and longing, using an expressive and evocative style of writing.

== Biography ==
Corrado Govoni was an Italian poet whose work emphasized "the minutiae of daily life". Prolific author, he can be considered as a member of both: the crepuscolari, or "twilight poets," and of the futurist movement. In Florence, as a young man, Govoni met the poet Giovanni Papini, who helped him to publish his first book of poems, Le fiale, in 1903, a volume "full of exotic images, difficult and rare rhymes, and unusual lexicon interspersed with archaic vocabulary".

Govoni’s works, during his long literary career, exhibits characteristics of many different literary currents and styles: while his early poems exhibited a ‘liberty-symbolism’, later in his career their style shifts towards crepuscolarsimo and futurism.

In 1944 he experienced the loss of his son, Aladino Govoni, killed by nazi-fascists. In 1950 Govoni won the Viareggio Prize for poetry.

== Selected works ==
=== Poetry ===
- Le fiale, Firenze, Lumachi, 1903
- Armonia in grigio et in silenzio, Firenze, Lumachi, 1903
- Fuochi d'artifizio, Palermo, Ganguzza-Lajosa, 1905
- Gli aborti, Ferrara, Taddei, 1907
- Poesie elettriche, Milano, Edizioni Futuriste di "Poesia", 1911
- Inaugurazione della primavera, Ferrara, Taddei, 1915
- Rarefazioni, Milano, Edizioni di "Poesia", 1915
- Poesie scelte, edited by A. Neppi, Ferrara, Taddei, 1918
- Poesie elettriche, Ferrara, Taddei, 1920
- Tre grani da seminare, Milano, Palmer, 1920
- Il quaderno dei sogni e delle stelle, Milano, Mondadori, 1924
- La Trombettina, Milano, Mondadori, 1924
- Brindisi alla notte, Milano, Bottega di Poesia, 1924
- Il flauto magico, Roma, Al tempo della Fortuna, 1932
- Canzoni a bocca chiusa, Firenze, Vallecchi, 1938
- Pellegrino d'amore, Milano, Mondadori, 1941
- Govonigiotto, Milano, Steli, 1943
- Aladino. Lamento su mio figlio morto, Milano, Mondadori, 1946
- L'Italia odia i poeti, Roma, Pagine Nuove, 1950
- Patria d'alto volo, Siena, Maia, 1953
- Preghiera al trifoglio, Roma, Casini, 1953
- Antologia poetica, edited and prefaced by G. Spagnoletti, Firenze, Sansoni, 1953
- Manoscritto nella bottiglia, with an essay of Giuseppe Ravegnani, Milano, Mondadori, 1954
- Stradario della primavera e altre poesie, Venezia, Neri Pozza, 1958
- Poesie (1903-1959), edited by Giuseppe Ravegnani, Milano, Mondadori, 1961
- Il Vino degli anni edited by Tommaso Lisi, Roma, L'officina Libri, 1979
- Armonia in grigio et in silenzio, Bari, Palomar, 1992
- Poesie, 1903 - 1958, Mondadori, 2000
- Aladino, edited by Giuseppe Lasala, Bari, Palomar, 2006
- Poesie elettriche, edited by Giuseppe Lasala, Macerata, Quodlibet, 2008
- Gli Aborti, edited by Francesco Targhetta, Genova, Edizioni San Marco dei Giustiniani, 2008
- Fuochi d'artifizio, edited by Francesco Targhetta, Macerata, Quodlibet, 2013

=== Prose ===
- La neve, Firenze, "La Voce (magazine)", 1915
- La caccia all'usignolo, Milano, Istituto Editoriale Italiano, 1915
- La santa verde, Ferrara, Taddei, 1919
- Anche l'ombra è sole, Milano, Mondadori, 1920
- Piccolo veleno color di rosa, Firenze, Bemporad, 1921
- La Terra contro il cielo, Milano, Mondadori, 1921
- La strada sull'acqua, Milano, Treves, 1923
- La cicala e la formica, Milano, Bottega di poesia, 1925
- Il volo d'amore, Milano, Mondadori, 1926
- Bomboniera, Roma, Sapientia, 1929
- La maschera che piange, L'Aquila, Vecchioni, 1930
- Misirizzi, Firenze, Vallecchi, 1930
- I racconti della ghiandaia, Lanciano, Carabba, 1932
- Arcobaleno, Lanciano, Carabba, 1932
- Il Temporale, Catanzaro, San Gennaro, 1934
- Splendore della poesia italiana, Milano, Hoepli, 1937, nuova ed., Milano, Ceschina, 1958
- Le rovine del Paradiso, Firenze, Vallecchi, 1940
- Il pane degli angeli, Napoli, Clet, 1940
- Confessioni davanti allo specchio, Brescia, Morceliana, 1942

== Bibliography ==
- Giovanni Papini; Pietro Pancrazi, Corrado Govoni, in Poeti d'oggi (1900-1920), Firenze, Vallecchi, 1920, pp. 160–170.
- Fausto Curi, Corrado Govoni, Milano, Mursia 1981.
- Giuseppe Iannaccone, Suppliche al Duce: documentazione inedita sui rapporti tra il poeta Corrado Govoni e Mussolini, Milano, Terziaria, 2002.
- Riccardo D'Anna, Govoni, Corrado, in Dizionario biografico degli italiani, vol. 58, Roma, Istituto dell'Enciclopedia Italiana, 2002. URL consultato il 21 maggio 2015.
- Matteo Bianchi (edited by), Corrado Govoni. Il poeta a cui non bastava la realtà, Ferrara, La Carmelina, 2016.
- Paolo Maccari, The presence of a poet: Corrado Govoni in the 20th century anthologies and literary criticism.
