= Faccetta nera =

Italian Fascist-era marching song

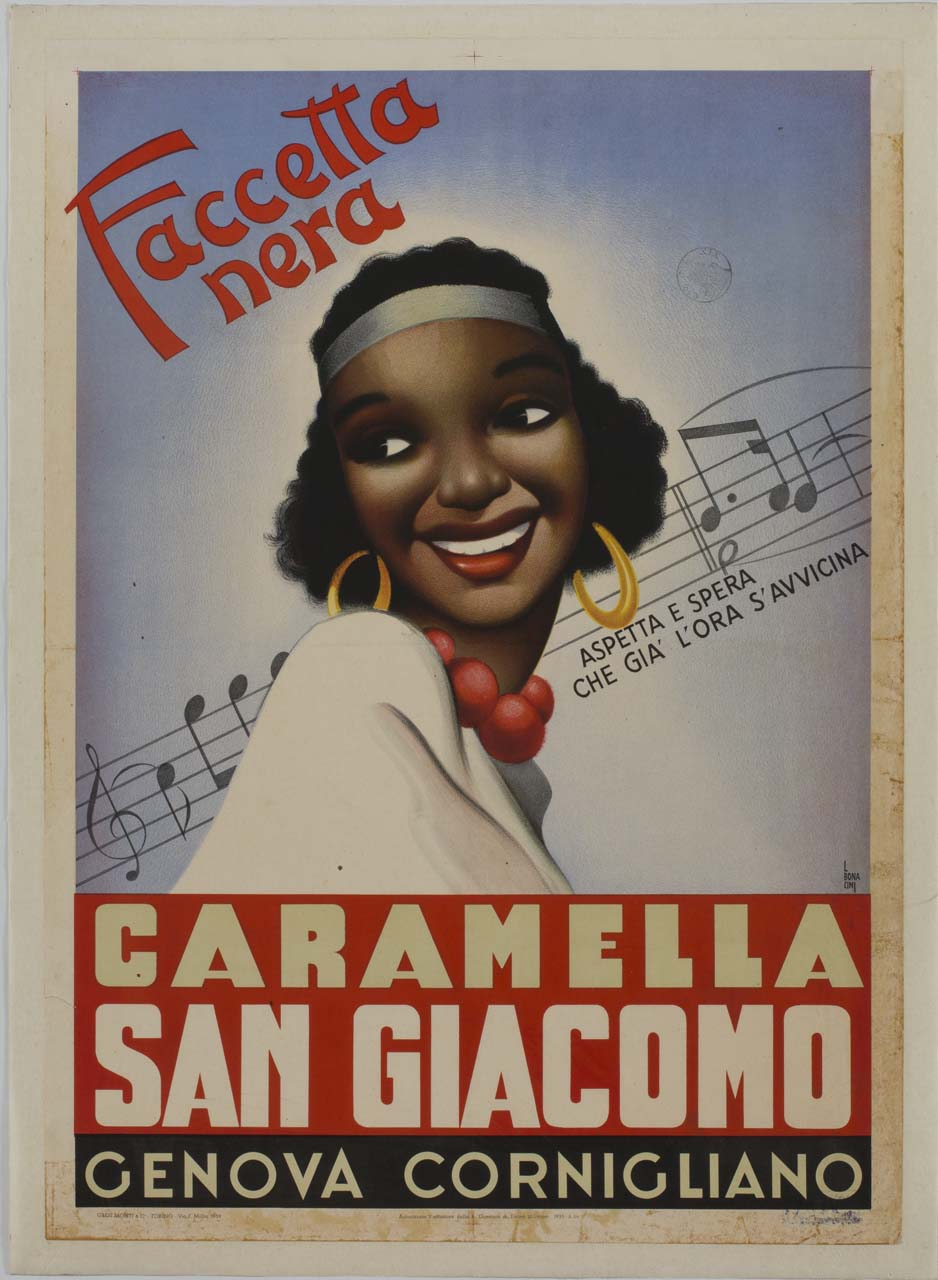

Song
- Released: 1935; 91 years ago
- Genre: March
- Songwriter: Renato Micheli

"'Faccetta nera'" (lit. 'Pretty little black face') is a popular marching song of Italy about the Second Italo-Ethiopian War. It was written by Renato Micheli with music by Mario Ruccione in 1935.

The lyrics are written from the perspective of a fascist Italian Blackshirt soldier during the invasion of Ethiopia. In the song, the Italian narrator tells a beautiful young enslaved Abysinnian (Ethiopian) girl that she will be liberated from slavery and ruled by a new regime. She is invited to parade with the fascist Blackshirts in Rome, where she is promised a new and better life.

== Themes ==
Slavery in Ethiopia is a prominent theme in the song. The song follows the trend of Italian fascist propaganda portraying the invasion not as a war of conquest, but as a war of liberation to abolish Ethiopian slavery.

== History ==
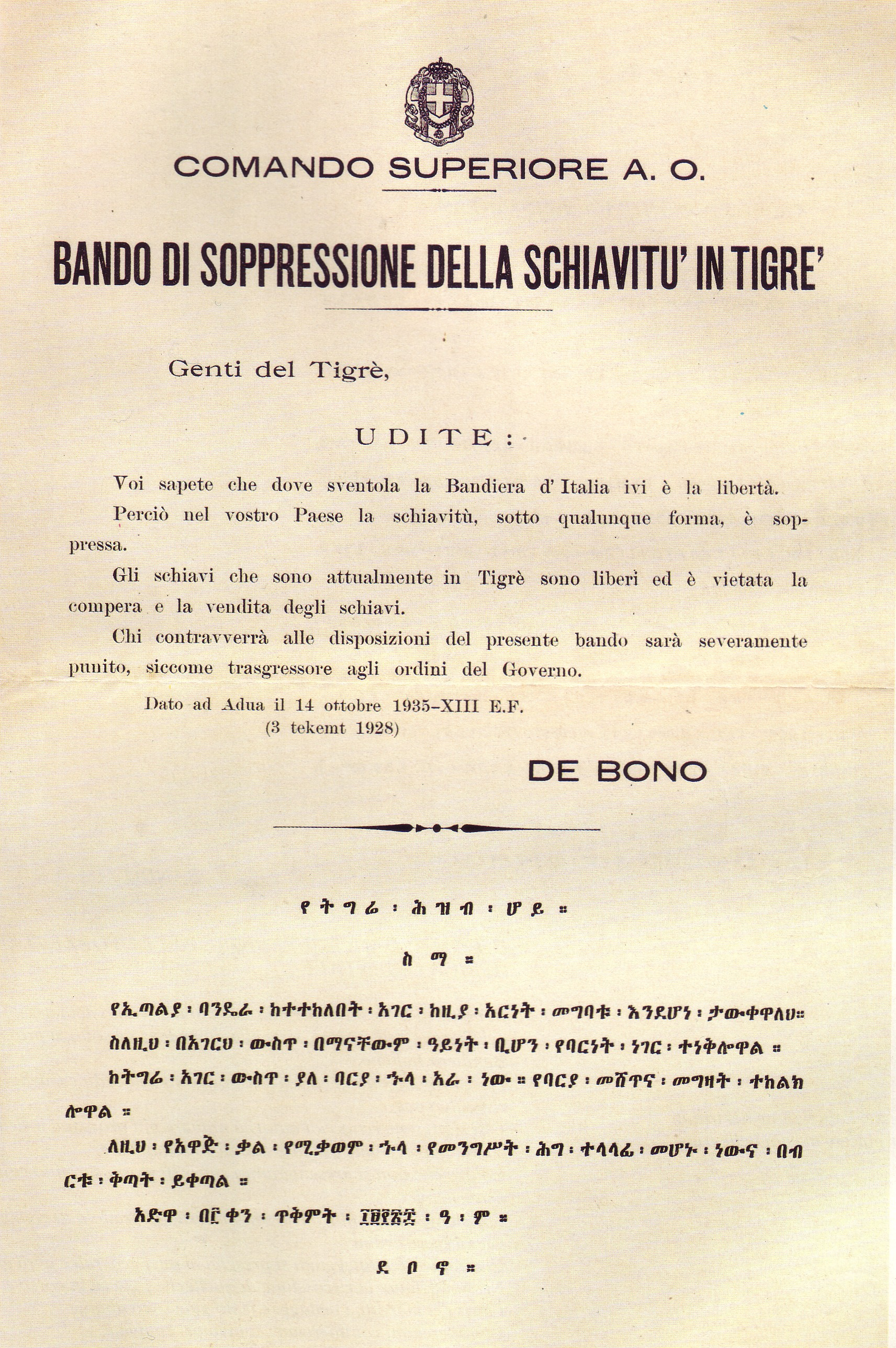
Italian notice, signed by General Emilio De Bono, proclaiming the abolishment of slavery in Tigray in Italian and Amharic. The abolition of slavery was one of the first measures taken by the Italian colonial government in Ethiopia. The translation of the proclamation is: "PROCLAMATION OF SUPPRESSION OF SLAVERY IN TIGRÉ People of Tigré, HEAR, as you know, where the Italian flag waves there's liberty. So, in your homeland, the slavery in every its form, is suppressed. The slaves that are now in Tigré are free, and is prohibited buying and selling slaves. Whoever violates the provisions of this proclamation will be severely punished, as transgressor of the government's orders. Given at Adua the 14th of October 1935 - 13th year of the fascist era"

The march is said to have been inspired by a beautiful young Abyssinian girl, who was found by the Italian troops at the beginning of the Italian invasion of Ethiopia.

During the invasion, the song was hugely popular in Italy and caused national fervor. During the fascist occupation of Ethiopia, Ethiopian women cohabited with Italian men in a system of concubinage known as madamismo. The implicitly erotic song was, however, somewhat of an embarrassment for the Fascist government, which had, starting in May 1936, introduced several laws prohibiting cohabitation and marriage between Italians and native people of the Italian colonial empire. These efforts culminated in the Italian racial laws of 1938. The Fascist authorities considered banning the song, and removed all picture postcards depicting Abyssinian women from Roman shop windows.

== Lyrics ==
Roman lyrics

Si mò dall' artipiano guardi er mare,
Moretta che sei schiava fra le schiave;
Vedrai come in sogno tante nave
E un tricolore sventola pé te!

Facetta Nera
Bell' abbissina
Aspetta e spera
Che già l'ora s'avvicina!
Quando staremo
Vicino a te
Noi te daremo
Un' altra legge e un altro Re!

La legge nostra è schiavitù d'amore
Ma libbertà di vita e di pensiere
Vendicheremo noi Camice Nere
L'Eroi caduti e libberamo te!

Facetta Nera
Bell' abbissina
Aspetta e spera
Che già l'ora s'avvicina!
Quando staremo
Vicino a te
Noi te daremo
Un'altra legge e un altro Re!

Facetta Nera, piccola abbissina
Te porteremo a Roma libberata
Dar sole nostro tu sarai baciata!
Starai in Camicia Nera, pure te!

Facetta Nera
Sarai Romana
E pé bandiera
Tu ciavrai quella italiana
Noi marceremo
Insieme a te
E sfileremo avanti ar Duce,
E avanti ar Re

Italian lyrics

Se tu dall'altipiano guardi il mare
Moretta che sei schiava fra gli schiavi
Vedrai come in un sogno tante navi
E un tricolore sventolar per te

Faccetta nera, bell'abissina
Aspetta e spera che già l'ora si avvicina!
quando saremo insieme a te
noi ti daremo un'altra legge e un altro Re

La legge nostra è schiavitù d'amore
il nostro motto è LIBERTÀ e DOVERE
vendicheremo noi Camicie Nere
Gli eroi caduti liberando te!

Faccetta nera, bell'abissina
Aspetta e spera che già l'ora si avvicina!
quando saremo insieme a te
noi ti daremo un'altra legge e un altro Re

Faccetta nera, piccola abissina
ti porteremo a Roma, liberata
Dal sole nostro tu sarai baciata
Sarai in Camicia Nera pure tu

Faccetta nera, sarai Romana
La tua bandiera sarà sol quella italiana!
Noi marceremo insieme a te
E sfileremo avanti al Duce e avanti al Re!

English translation

If you look at the sea from the hills
Young brunette, a slave among slaves
Like in a dream you will see many ships
And a tricolour waving for you

Pretty black face, beautiful Abyssinian
Wait and see, for the hour is coming!
When we are with you
We shall give you another law and another king

Our law is slavery of love
Our motto is FREEDOM and DUTY
We, the Blackshirts, will avenge
the heroes that died to free you!

Pretty black face, beautiful Abyssinian
Wait and see, for the hour is coming!
When we are with you
We shall give you another law and another king

Pretty black face, little Abyssinian
We will take you to Rome, as a freedwoman
You will be kissed by our sun
and a black shirt you too will wear

Pretty black face, you will be Roman
Your only flag will be the Italian one!
We will march together with you
and parade in front of the Duce and the king!

== In popular culture ==
The song is one of many Italian songs featured in Martin Scorsese's 1973 film Mean Streets. The song is prominently featured in Francesco Rosi’s film Christ Stopped at Eboli, where blackshirts prepare to be sent to Ethiopia.

== See also ==
- Civilizing mission
- Giovinezza
- Italian imperialism under fascism
