= Two Hearts Among the Beasts =

- Directed by: Giorgio Simonelli
- Written by: Goffredo D'Andrea (novel); Vincenzo Rovi; Ákos Tolnay; Steno
- Starring: Totò; Vera Carmi; Enrico Glori
- Cinematography: Ugo Lombardi
- Edited by: Giorgio Simonelli
- Music by: Ezio Carabella; Mario Ruccione
- Production companies: Consorzio Tirrenia; Film Bassoli; Società Italiana Cines
- Distributed by: ENIC
- Release date: 26 May 1943
- Running time: 83 minutes
- Country: Italy
- Language: Italian

Two Hearts Among the Beasts (Italian: Due cuori fra le belve) is a 1943 Italian comedy film directed by Giorgio Simonelli and starring Totò, Vera Carmi and Enrico Glori. A dancing master takes part in an expedition to Africa find a missing anthropologist whose daughter he is in love with.

The film's sets were designed by Alberto Boccianti. It was shot at Cinecittà in Rome.

== Plot ==
An important Italian scientist disappears in the Jungle, and his niece Laura sets off to find him. Toto, dance teacher, ends up in the wrong steamer trip, and discovers that the companions of the niece have a sinister plan: kidnap her. The ship, however, is shipwrecked on the island of the Jungle, and Toto is worshiped as a god by the natives, and is then received by the dispersed scientist, who sees him as "the missing link in the evolutionary chain of mankind".

== Cast ==
- Totò as Totò
- Vera Carmi as Laura Berti
- Enrico Glori as Mr. Smith
- Nando Bruno as "the little giant"
- Egilda Cecchini as Nalù the dancer queen of the cannibals
- Enzo Biliotti as Professor Lorenzo Berti
- Primo Carnera as Cannibal Chief
- Claudio Ermelli as Agatino
- Lia Orlandini as Clara Palozzi
- Giovanni Grasso as the head - chef
- Umberto Spadaro as the witch doctor
- Arturo Bragaglia as Doctor Palozzi
- Guido Morisi as Romero, Smith's partner in crime
- Federico Collino as Pietro, the technician
- Vittorio Bartozzi
- Oreste Bilancia
- Lucy D'Albert
- Stefano Daffinà
- Tullio Galvani
- Alfredo Martinelli
- Alfredo Ragusa

== Bibliography ==
- Parish, James Robert. Film Actors Guide. Scarecrow Press, 1977.
