= Goodbye Youth (1918 film) =

1918 film

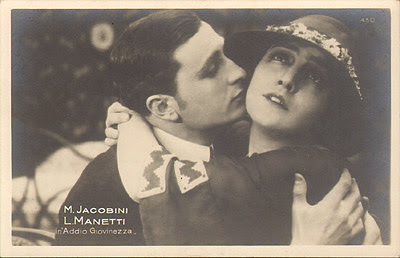
- Directed by: Augusto Genina
- Written by: Sandro Camasio (play); Nino Oxilia (play); Augusto Genina
- Starring: Maria Jacobini; Lido Manetti; Helena Makowska
- Cinematography: Giovanni Tomatis
- Production company: Itala Film
- Release date: 1 July 1918
- Running time: 76 minutes
- Country: Italy
- Language: Italian

Goodbye Youth (Italian: Addio giovinezza!) is a 1918 Italian silent drama film directed by Augusto Genina and starring Maria Jacobini, Lido Manetti and Helena Makowska, The film was adapted from the 1911 play of the same name by Nino Oxilia and Sandro Camasio, The film is set in Turin at the beginning of the twentieth century, where a student begins a romance with a seamstress, Dorina, however he is lured away by a sophisticated older woman to Dorina's distress. Genina remade the film in 1927, again as a silent. It was then remade as a sound film of the same title in 1940.

== Cast ==
- Maria Jacobini
- Lido Manetti
- Helena Makowska
- Ruggero Capodaglio
- Oreste Bilancia

== Bibliography ==
- Goble, Alan, The Complete Index to Literary Sources in Film, Walter de Gruyter, 1999,
