= Giorgio Bàrberi Squarotti =

Italian academic and critic

Giorgio Bàrberi Squarotti (Italian pronunciation: [ˈdʒordʒo ˈbarberi skwaˈrɔtti]; 14 September 1929 – 9 April 2017) was an Italian academic, literary critic and poet. He taught at the University of Turin from 1967 until his death in 2017. He was considered to be one of the most important literary critics of his time.

== Biography ==
Giorgio Bàrberi Squarotti was born in 1929 in Turin. He received his PhD in Italian literature from the University of Turin in 1952–1953, with a thesis on Giordano Bruno. He taught Italian literature at the same university from 1967 until his death in 2017, and was a prominent literary critic. He was known for his detailed studies on classical Italian authors such as Dante, Petrarch, Machiavelli, Tasso, Manzoni, Verga and Gozzano, and was also interested in contemporary writers, including D'Annunzio and Svevo. He coordinated the Grande dizionario della lingua italiana, published by UTET, where he worked as editor. UTET also published his Storia della civiltà letteraria italiana in six parts (1990–1996).

== Publications ==
=== Critical work ===
- Astrazione e realtà, Milano: Rusconi e Paolazzi (Quaderni de Il Verri), 1960
- Poesia e narrativa del secondo Novecento, Milano: Mursia, 1961, 1967, 1971, 1978
- Metodo, stile, storia, Milano: Fabbri, 1962
- La poesia italiana contemporanea dal Carducci ai giorni nostri (con Stefano Jacomuzzi), Messina-Firenze: D'Anna, 1963, 1973, 1980
- La narrativa italiana del dopoguerra, Bologna: Cappelli, 1965, 1968, 1975
- Pagine di teatro, Torino: SEI, 1965
- Teoria e prove dello stile del Manzoni, Milano: Silva, 1965
- La cultura e la poesia italiana del dopo guerra, Bologna: Cappelli, 1966
- La forma tragica del Principe e altri saggi sul Machiavelli, Firenze: Olschki, 1966
- Simboli e strutture della poesia del Pascoli, Messina-Firenze: D'Anna, 1966, 1976
- Camillo Sbarbaro, Milano: Mursia, 1971
- Il gesto improbabile. Tre saggi su Gabriele D'Annunzio, Palermo: Flaccovio, 1971
- L'artificio dell'eternità. Studi dantechi, Verona: Fiorini, 1972
- Il codice di Babele, Milano: Rizzoli, 1972
- Manzoni. Testimonianze di critica e di polemica (con Marziano Guglielminetti), Messina-Firenze: D'Anna, 1973
- Gli inferi e il labirinto. Da Pascoli a Montale, Bologna: Cappelli, 1974
- Poesia e ideologia borghese, Napoli: Liguori, 1976
- Fine dell'idillio. Da Dante a Marino, Genova: Il melangolo, 1978
- Le sorti del tragico. Il novecento italiano: romanzo e teatro, Ravenna: Longo, 1978
- Il romanzo contro la storia. Studi sui Promessi sposi, Milano: Vita e pensiero, 1980
- Dall'anima al sottosuolo. Problemi della letteratura dell'Ottocento da Leopardi a Lucini, Ravenna: Longo, 1982
- Giovanni Verga. Le finzioni dietro il verismo, Palermo: Flaccovio, 1982
- Invito alla lettura di Gabriele d'Annunzio, Milano: Mursia, 1982, 1988, 1993
- Il potere della parola. Studi sul Decameron, Napoli: Federico & Ardia, 1983
- La poesia del Novecento. Morte e trasfigurazione del soggetto, Caltanissetta: Sciascia, 1985
- L'ombra di Argo. Studi sulla Commedia, Torino: Genesi, 1986, 1992
- L'onore in corte. Dal Castiglione al Tasso, Milano: F. Angeli, 1986
- La forma e la vita. Il romanzo del Novecento, Milano: Mursia, 1987
- Machiavelli, o La scelta della letteratura, Roma: Bulzoni, 1987
- Manzoni. Le delusioni della letteratura, Rovito: Marra, 1988
- Il sogno della letteratura, Milano: F. Angeli, 1988
- In nome di Beatrice e altre voci, Torino: Genesi, 1989
- Invito alla lettura di Gabriele D'Annunzio, Mursia, 1990
- La simbologia di Giovanni Pascoli, Mucchi, 1990
- Le maschere dell'eroe. Dall'Alfieri a Pasolini, Lecce: Milella, 1990
- Le colline, i maestri, gli dei, Treviso: Quaranta, 1992
- La scrittura verso il nulla: D'Annunzio, Torino: Genesi, 1992
- Tre sogni nella letteratura-Una stagione fiamminga con Giorgio, Porreca, G. Paolo, AGE-Alfredo Guida Editore, 1992
- Il sogno e l'epica, Torino: Genesi, 1993
- Il viaggio di liberazione attraverso l'Inferno, Torino: Genesi, 1993
- Parodia e pensiero: Giordano Bruno, Milano: Greco & Greco, 1997
- Le capricciose ambagi della letteratura, Torino: Tirrenia, 1998
- Il vero Ettorre: l'eroe del "Giorno", Edizioni dell'Orso, 1999
- Il terzo giorno, Pironti, 1999
- La quarta triade con Giuliano Gramigna e Angelo Mundula, Spirali, 2000
- Ludovico Ariosto-Torquato Tasso con Sergio Zatti, Editalia, 2000
- L'orologio d'Italia. Carlo Levi e altri racconti, Ragusa: Libroitaliano, 2001
- Le vane nevi, Bonaccorso, 2002
- Corrado Alvaro. Atti del Convegno (Mappano Torinese) con Marziano Guglielminetti, Morace Aldo M., Falzea, 2002
- Addio alla poesia del cuore, Sovera Multimedia, 2002
- I miti e il sacro. Poesia del Novecento, Cosenza: Pellegrini, 2003
- Il tragico cristiano da Dante ai moderni, Firenze: Olschki, 2003
- La buona gara, Libroitaliano, 2003
- Tre poeti. Vol.1, Zaccagnino, 2003 (con Amoretti Giangiacomo; Balbis Giannino)
- Ottocento ribelle, Albano: Anemone Purpurea, 2005
- La teoria e le interpretazioni, Napoli: Guida, 2005
- Le cortesie e le audaci impresse. Moda, maghe e magie nei poemi cavallereschi, Lecce: Manni, 2006
- La letteratura instabile. Il teatro e la novella fra Cinquecento ed età barocca, Treviso: Santi Quaranta, 2006
- Il pipistrello a teatro. Pirandello, narrativa e tragedia, Verona: Bonaccorso, 2006
- La farfalla, l'anima. Saggi su Gabriele d'Annunzio narratore, Verona: Bonaccorso, 2007
- Il sistema della narrativa. Gli autori del Novecento: saggi critici, Montichiari: Zanetto, 2008
- La poesia, il sacro e il patinoire. Saggi su Gozzano e Pavese, Sestri Levante: Gammarò, 2009
- La cicala, la forbice e l'ubriaco. Montale, Sbarbaro e l'altra Liguria, Sestri Levante: Gammarò, 2011
- Le donne al potere e altre interpretazioni. Boccaccio e Ariosto, Lecce: Manni, 2011
- Entello, Ulisse, la matrona e la fanciulla. Saggi su Saba e Campana, Sestri Levante: Gammarò, 2011
- Tutto l'Inferno. Lettura integrale della prima cantica del poema dantesco, Milano: F. Angeli, 2011
- L'ultimo cuore del novecento. Paesaggi per la poesia, Sestri Levante: Gammarò, 2012

=== Creative work ===
- La voce roca, Milano: All'insegna del pesce d'oro, 1960
- La declamazione onesta, Milano: Rizzoli, 1965
- Finzione e dolore, Pisa: Valenti, 1976
- Notizie dalla vita, Livorno: Bastogi, 1977
- Il marinaio del Mar Nero e altre poesie, Fossalta di Piave: Rebellato, 1980
- Dalla bocca della balena, Torino: Genesi, 1986
- In un altro regno, Torino: Genesi, 1990
- La scena del mondo, Torino: Genesi, 1994
- Dal fondo del tempio, Torino: Genesi, 1999
- Le vane nevi, Verona: Bonaccorso, 2002
- Il gioco e il verbo, Castelfrentano: Orient Express, 2005
- La storia vera, Montichiari: Zanetto, 2006
- I doni e la speranza, Albano: Anemone Purpurea, 2007
- Gli affanni, gli agi e la speranza, Forlì: L'arcolaio, 2008
- Le foglie di Sibilla, Genova: De Ferrari, 2008
- Lo scriba delle stagioni, Castel di Judica: Samperi, 2008
- Il giullare di Nôtre-Dame des Neiges, Roma: EdiLet, 2010
