= Carola Prosperi =

Italian writer, feminist, and journalist (1883–1981)

- Born: 12 October 1883; Turin
- Died: 26 March 1981 (aged 97); Turin

Carola Prosperi (12 October 1883 – 26 March 1981) was an Italian writer, feminist and journalist.

== Biography ==
Prosperi was born in Turin in 1883 where she worked as a teacher in the Niccolò Tommaseo school. Prosperi also wrote for the magazines Lidel, La Donna and the newspaper La Stampa. She was a prolific writer beginning in 1899 with a series of fairy tales and then working on short stories and novels. Though her novels began with the theme of isolated middle-class women she also wrote for children. She wrote approximately 2,800 short stories and more than 35 novels. Although she did not consider herself a feminist writer, modern scholars do see her this way. Prosperi died in Turin in 1981.

== Bibliography ==
=== Short stories ===
- La profezia e altre novelle, Torino, Lattes, 1907
- Il cuore in gioco, Milano, Società Editoriale Italiana, 1913
- Vocazioni, Milano, Treves, 1919
- Amore...amore, Firenze, Battistelli, 1920
- Dimenticare, Firenze, Battistelli, 1920
- I lillà sono fioriti, Milano, Treves, 1921
- Tormenti, Firenze, Battistelli, 1921
- La felicità in gabbia, Milano, Mondadori, 1922
- Stagione al mare, Cremona, Edizioni Librarie Italiane, 1944

=== Novels ===
- La paura d'amare, Torino, Lattes, 1911
- La nemica dei sogni, Milano, Treves, 1914
- L'estranea, Milano, Treves, 1915
- La casa meravigliosa, Firenze, Battistelli, 1920
- Il fanciullo feroce, Milano, Treves, 1921
- L'amore di un'altra, Torino, Agle, 1922
- Una storia appena cominciata, Firenze, Le Monnier, 1923
- Vergine madre, Milano-Verona, Mondadori, 1924
- Il pianto di Lilian, Milano-Verona, Mondadori, 1931
- Tempesta intorno a Lyda, Milano-Verona, Mondadori, 1931
- Agnese, amante ingenua, Milano, Rizzoli, 1934
- Il secondo amore, Milano, Rizzoli, 1934
- Amanti nel labirinto, Milano, Rizzoli, 1937
- Domani ci ameremo, Milano, Rizzoli, 1938
- Rose bianche, Milano, Rizzoli, 1938
- L'altro sogno, Milano-Roma, Rizzoli, 1939
- L'indifesa, Milano-Verona, Mondadori, 1940
- La maschera d'amore, Milano, Rizzoli, 1941
- Incomprensibile cuore, Milano, Rizzoli, 1942
- La donna forte, Milano, Rizzoli, 1942
- La sua sconosciuta, Milano, Rizzoli, 1942
- Graziella, Milano, Rizzoli, 1943
- Ho guardato nel tuo cuore, Milano, Sonzogno, 1943
- Qualcuno ti attende, Milano, Rizzoli, 1944
- Il cuore ascolta, Milano, Rizzoli, 1945
- La colpa segreta, Milano, Rizzoli, 1947
- La signorina Chiara, Milano-Roma, Rizzoli, 1947
- Per un altro amore, Milano, Rizzoli, 1947
- L'amore sbaglia, Milano, Rizzoli, 1948
- Le due suore, Torino, Sas, 1950
- Eva contro Eva, Torino, Sas, 1951
- Fiamme bugiarde, Milano, Rizzoli, 1951
- Angeli senza cielo, Torino, Sas, 1952
- La freccia spezzata, Torino, Sas, 1952
- Un marito per Patrizia, Milano, Rizzoli, 1953
- L'angelo della televisione, Milano, Rizzoli, 1956
- Buona fortuna, Natalia!, Alba (Cuneo), Edizioni Paoline, 1967
- Storia di Selvaggia, Alba, Edizioni Paoline, 1969
