= The Triumph of an Emperor =

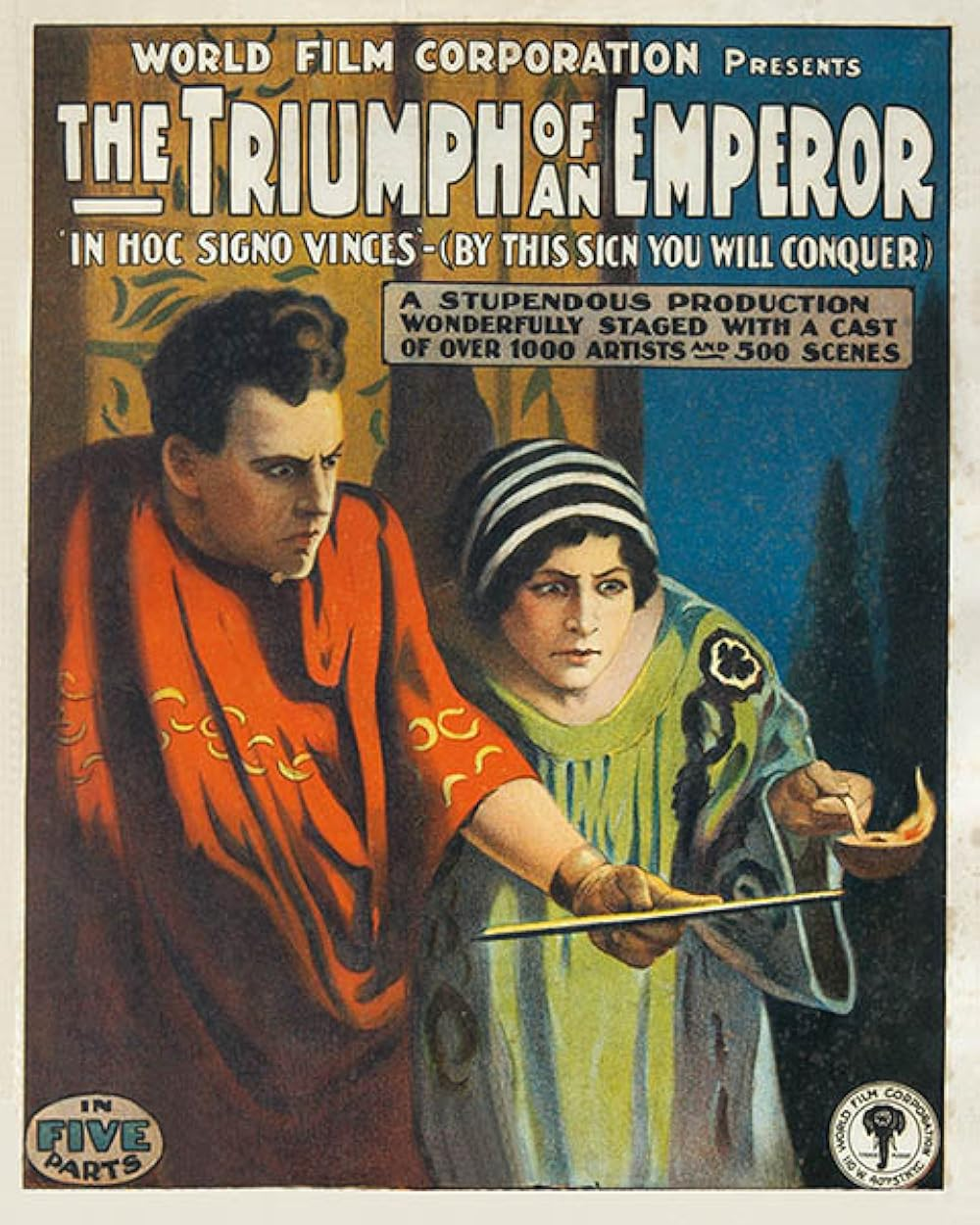
- 1913 American poster
- In hoc signo vinces!
- Directed by: Nino Oxilia
- Screenplay by: Giovanni Alessio
- Starring: Maria Jacobini; Dillo Lombardi; Bartolomeo Pagano
- Production company: Savoia Film
- Release date: 13 December 1913 (Italy)
- Running time: 120 minutes (original cut)
- Country: Italy
- Languages: Silent; Italian Intertitles

The Triumph of an Emperor (Italian: In hoc signo vinces!) is a 1913 Italian epic silent film, directed by Nino Oxilia. The film recounts the rise to power of Constantine the Great, from the collapse of the Tetrarchy to the Edict of Milan. This monumental epic employed around 600 extras for the crowd scenes. Divided into three parts, it remained the longest film in Italian silent cinema until the release of Cabiria in 1914. It was distributed in France, Germany, Great Britain, the Netherlands, Spain, Sweden and the United States. It enjoyed particular success in the Catholic south of the Netherlands, where it was screened until the early 1920s.

== Synopsis ==
Under the rule of the Tetrarchs the Roman Empire is plagued by civil wars and the bloody persecution of Christians. Meanwhile, life in the imperial palaces is characterised by unbridled luxury and dynastic intrigue. In 312 AD, Constantine crosses the Alps into Italy with his army to defeat the usurper Maxentius. Following several victories, Constantine establishes his camp near the Ponte Milvio on the Tiber, preparing for the final assault. The night before the battle, he has a vision of Christ in heaven, urging him to place the Cross on his soldiers' shields and promising him victory. Fighting under the banner of Christianity, Constantine's army overpowers the enemy, and Maxentius is drowned in the Tiber while fleeing. The following year, Constantine – now Emperor of the West – and Licinius – Emperor of the East and husband of Constantine's sister Constantia – issue the Edict of Milan (313 AD), granting freedom of worship for all religions and putting an end to the persecution of Christians.

== Bibliography ==
- Bernardini, Aldo; Martinelli, Vittorio (1994). Il cinema muto italiano. Vol. 5. Part 1. Rome: Nuova ERI. ISBN 8839709185.
