= Amalia Guglielminetti =

Italian poet and writer (1881–1941)

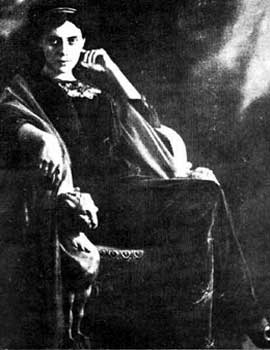
Amalia Guglielminetti

Amalia Guglielminetti (4 April 1881 – 4 December 1941) was an Italian poet and writer.

== Life ==
Amalia, who had two sisters, Emma and Erminia, and a brother, Ernesto, was born in Turin to Pietro Guglielminetti and his wife Felicita Lavezzato. Her great-grandfather had moved from Cravanzana to Turin around 1858, where he had established a timber business. He invented a water canteen, at that time made of wood, which became popular. Her father died in 1886, and the family moved in with a grandfather, who sent Amalia to a religious school.

She started writing in 1901 for the Gazzetta del Popolo where her poetry was published in the Sunday supplement. Her poetry then appeared in Voci di Giovinezza, published in 1903, and was dedicated to her father.

Her main works are the poetry collections Le seduzioni (1908) and L'insonne (1913) and the prose collections I volti dell'amore (1913) and Quando avevo un amante (1923).

She had an affair with Guido Gozzano, with whom she exchanged a series of love letters in 1907-09, published posthumously.

Between 1916 and 1925, she wrote books for children: "Fiabe in versi" (1916); "Gli occhi cerchiati d'azzurro" (1920); "La reginetta Chiomadoro" (1923); "Il ragno incantato" (1923); and "La carriera dei pupazzi" (1925). In addition, she contributed to Lidel, a nationalist women's magazine which was in circulation in the period 1919–1935.

In the following years, she became romantically involved with Pitigrilli (Dino Segre). The relationship became so intense that she had a nervous breakdown. She eventually recovered and felt that the experience had made her stronger.

In 1935, Guglielminetti moved to Rome to pursue a career in journalism, but returned to Turin in 1937. She died from complications resulting from an accident during an air raid. She had always been a solitary and somewhat depressed figure.

== Works ==
=== Poetry ===
- Voci di giovinezza, Torino; Roma, Roux e Viarengo, 1903
- Le vergini folli, Torino; Roma, Società Tip. Ed. Nazionale, 1907
- Le vergini folli - Le seduzioni (con un autoritratto e intervista), Chioggia-Venezia, Damocle, 2012
- Le seduzioni, Torino, S. Lattes e C., 1909; Palomar, 2001
- Emma, Torino, Tip. V. Bona, 1909
- L'insonne, Milano, Treves, 1913
- Fiabe in versi, Ostiglia, La scolastica 1916
- Il ragno incantato, Roma; Milano, Mondadori 1922
- La carriera dei pupazzi, Milano, Sonzogno, 1924
- I serpenti di Medusa, Milano, La Prora, stampa 1934
- L’insonne, Fiabe in versi e altri scritti, coll. Donne in poesia a cura di M. G. Amati, Bertoni Editore, Perugia 2022.

=== Fiction ===
- I volti dell'amore, Milano, Fratelli Treves, 1913
- Anime allo specchio, Milano, Treves, 1915
- Le ore inutili, Milano, F.lli Treves, 1919
- Gli occhi cerchiati d'azzurro, Milano, Italia, 1920
- La porta della gioia, Milano, Vitagliano, 1920
- La reginetta Chiomadoro, Roma-Milano, Mondadori, 1921
- Le distrazioni di Mimi, Milano, Gandolfi 1922
- Quando avevo un amante, Milano, Casa Ed. Sonzogno, 1923
- La rivincita del maschio, Torino, Lattes, 1923
- Il pigiama del moralista, Roma, Fauno, 1927
- Tipi bizzarri: novelle, Milano, Mondadori, 1931
- Passione, novella in: L’uomo che è mio by Luciana Peverelli, Rizzoli 1940.
- Il cuore tardo, Pisa, ETS 1985

=== Drama ===
- L'amante ignoto, poema tragico, Milano, Treves, 1911
- Il gingillo di lusso, commedia in un atto, 1924
- Il ladro di gioielli, commedia in un atto, 1924
- Nei e cicisbei - Il baro dell'amore - Commedia in un atto: Commedia in tre atti, Milano, Mondadori, 1926

=== Epistles ===
- Lettere d'amore di Guido Gozzano e Amalia Guglielminetti, Milano, Garzanti, 1951

== Bibliography ==
- Benso, Ornella: Una relazione letteraria. Amalia Guglielminetti e Guido Gozzano, Turín, 1944.
- Gastaldi, M.: Amalia Guglielminetti, Milán, 1930.
- Guglielminetti, Marziano: La Musa subalpina. Amalia e Guido, Pastonchi e Pitigrilli, Florencia, L. S. Olschki, 2007.
- Ferraro, Alessandro: La corsa del levriero. Amalia Guglielminetti nel Novecento italiano, in Amalia Guglielminetti, La rivincita del maschio, edit by Alessandro Ferraro, Genova, Sagep, 2014.
- Ferraro, Alessandro: Il frutto dietro la foglia. 1928 e 1934: Amalia Guglielminetti denunciata due volte per oltraggio al pudore, «Nuova Corrente», LXII, 155, 2015.
- Ferraro, Alessandro: Amalia Guglielminetti. Le opere, la vita (1881-1941), Genova, 2016.
- Rota, Marina: Amalia, se Voi foste uomo..., Torino, Golem, 2016
- Rota, Marina: Amalia Guglielminetti. L'amore in versi con Guido Gozzano, Edizioni Pedrini, 2023
- Rota, Marina: Certe donne, a Torino. Incontri ravvicinati con figure straordinarie, Buendia Books, Torino, 2024
