= Star of the Sea (1928 film) =

1928 film

- Directed by: Ubaldo Maria Del Colle
- Starring: Goffredo D'Andrea; Gemma De Ferrari; Ubaldo Maria Del Colle
- Production company: Antonellini Film
- Release date: December 1928
- Country: Italy
- Languages: Silent; Italian intertitles

Star of the Sea (Italian: Stella del mare) is a 1928 Italian silent drama film directed by Ubaldo Maria Del Colle.

== Cast ==
- Maria Antonellini
- La Cleo
- Goffredo D'Andrea
- Gemma De Ferrari
- Ubaldo Maria Del Colle
- Gennarino Esposito
- Giuseppe Gherardi
- Gennaro Sebastiani

== Bibliography ==
- Scialò, Pasquale. La sceneggiata. Rappresentazioni di un genere popolare. Guida Editori, 2002.
