= Goffredo D'Andrea =

Italian actor

- Occupations: Actor, Director, Writer
- Years active: 1916–1954 (film)

Goffredo D'Andrea was an Italian film actor who appeared mainly during the silent era. He also worked occasionally as a screenwriter and film director.

== Selected filmography ==
- Castigo (1917)
- La principessa di Bagdad (1918)
- Vicenzella (1923)
- Napule ca se ne và (1926)
- Star of the Sea (1928)
- Assunta Spina (1930)
- Fiocca la neve (1931)
- Two Hearts Among the Beasts (1943)
- Guarany (1948)

== Bibliography ==
- Goble, Alan. The Complete Index to Literary Sources in Film. Walter de Gruyter, 1999.
