= Red Seal =

Red Seal may refer to:

- Red Seal (tobacco) sold by the U.S. Smokeless Tobacco Company
- Red Seal Program, a Canadian program to assess the skills of tradespeople
- Red seal ships, 17th century Japanese armed merchant sailing ships
- RCA Red Seal Records, owned by Sony Music
- Red Seal (film), a 1950 Italian film directed by Flavio Calzavara
