= Lidel (magazine) =

Italian women's fashion magazine (1919–1935)

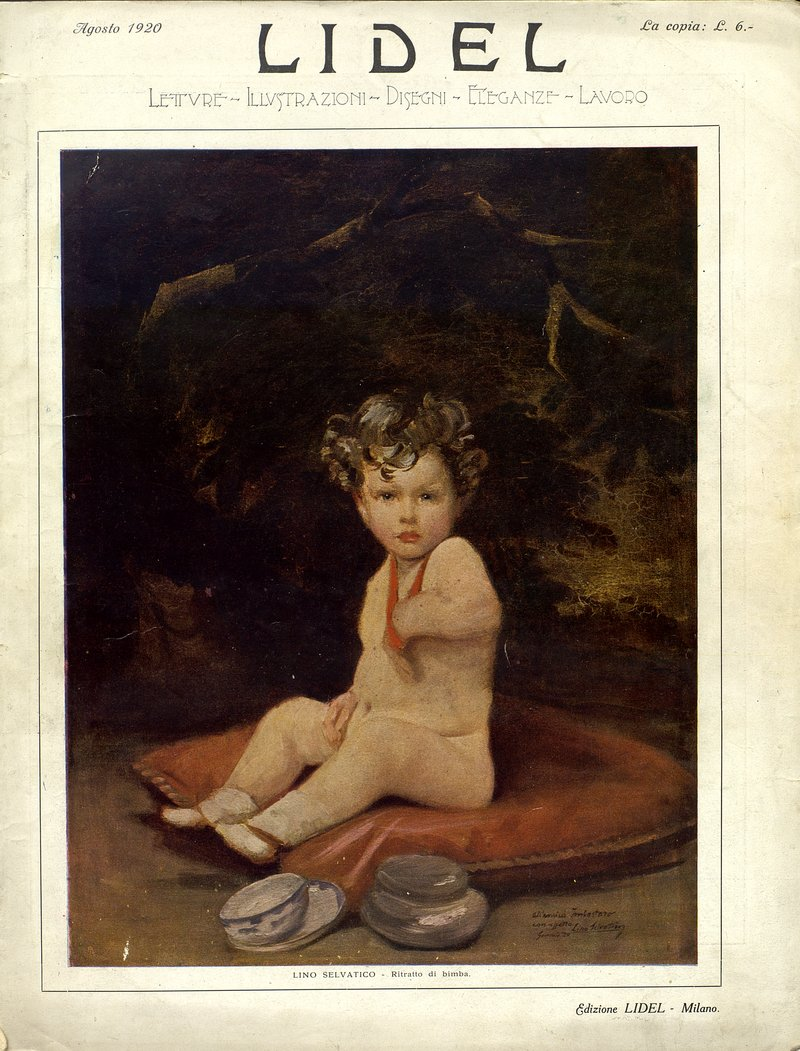
- Cover of Lidel issue 8 dated 1920
- Categories: Women's magazine; Fashion magazine
- Founder: Lydia Dosio De Liguoro
- Founded: 1919
- Final issue: 1935
- Country: Italy
- Based in: Milan
- Language: Italian

Lidel was a nationalist women's fashion magazine which was in circulation Milan, Italy, in the period 1919–1935. The title was a reference to its founder's name, Lydia Dosio De Liguoro, as well as to the words Letture, illustrazioni, disegni, eleganze, lavori (Italian: Readings, illustrations, drawings, elegance, works). The magazine played a significant role in the birth of Italian fashion, but at the same time became one of the most militant publications of Fascist Italy.

== History and profile ==
Lidel was launched by journalist Lydia Dosio De Liguoro in 1919. It was published on a monthly basis and had its headquarters in Milan. The magazine's target reader group was bourgeois women. Its goal was to instill a sense of Italian national identity and nationhood among these women and to compete with the French fashion magazines. It employed fashion to promote the idea of a modern Italy and a sense of pride and solidarity among Italians.

Major contributors of Lidel were Grazia Deledda, Luigi Pirandello, Ada Negri, Carola Prosperi, Sibilla Aleramo, Amalia Guglielminetti, Goffredo Bellonci, Matilde Serao and Eugenio Treves. The cover page of the monthly featured work by Bruno Munari last of which was published in the November 1930 issue. It frequently featured advertisement of luxury products and fashion illustrations, short stories and articles on art. The magazine folded in 1935.
