= Gemma De Ferrari =

Italian actress

- Born: Naples, Italy
- Occupation: Actress
- Years active: 1910–1929 (film)

Gemma De Ferrari was an Italian film actress of the silent era.

== Selected filmography ==
- Captain Fracasse (1919)
- Samson (1923)
- Tra i sorrisi di Napoli (1926)
- Goodbye Youth (1927)
- The Confessions of a Woman (1928)
- Star of the Sea (1928)
- Napule e Surriento (1929)
- Maratona (1929)

== Bibliography ==
- Goble, Alan. The Complete Index to Literary Sources in Film. Walter de Gruyter, 1999.
