= Giovinezza =

Italian Fascist anthem

English: Youth
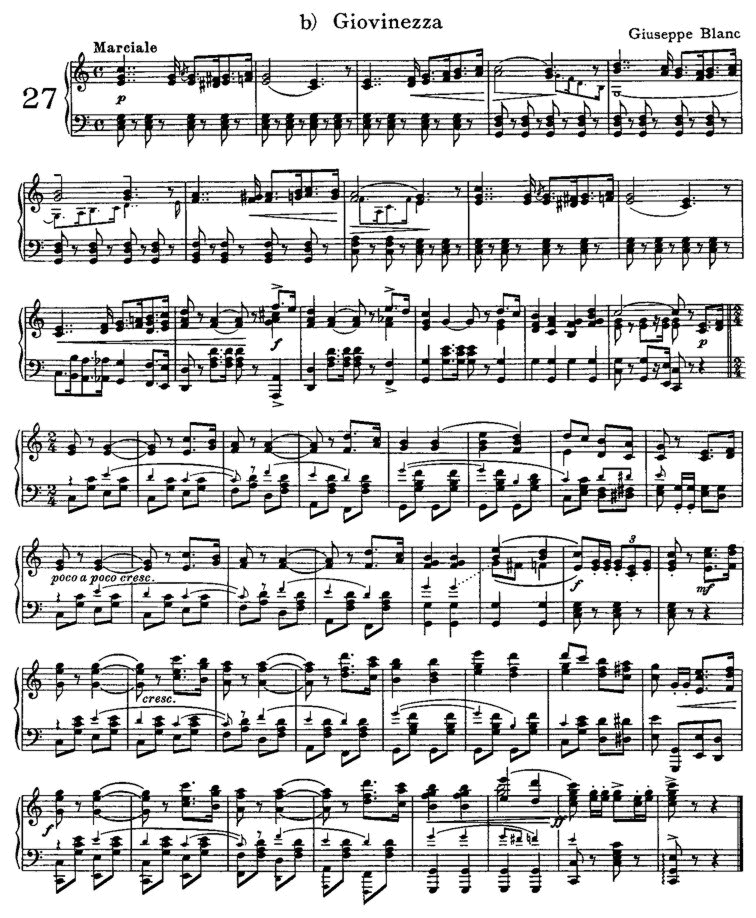
- Score of "Giovinezza"
- Former national anthem of Italy
- Lyrics: Nino Oxilia (1909); Marcello Manni (1919); Salvator Gotta (1924)
- Music: Giuseppe Blanc, 1909
- Adopted: 1943
- Relinquished: 1945
- Preceded by: "Marcia Reale" (Kingdom of Italy)
- Succeeded by: "La Leggenda del Piave"

Audio sample
- Instrumental version: file; help

"Giovinezza" ([dʒoviˈnettsa]; Italian for 'Youth') was the official hymn of the Italian National Fascist Party, regime, and army, and was an unofficial national anthem of the Kingdom of Italy between 1924 and 1943. Although often sung with the Royal March, the official anthem, some sources consider "Giovinezza" to have supplanted it as the de facto national anthem of the country (Inno della Patria), to the dismay of Victor Emmanuel III—a powerful symbol of the diarchy between the King and Mussolini. It was subsequently an unofficial anthem of the Italian Social Republic.

Ubiquitous in mid-twentieth century Italy, the hymn emphasized youth as a theme of the fascist movement and was one example of the centrality of the Arditi to the fascist narrative.

== History ==
"Giovinezza" was composed by lawyer and composer Giuseppe Blanc in 1909 as "Il Commiato" (Italian for "farewell"). Blanc later also wrote other fascist songs, including The Eagles of Rome, an Ode to the Italian Empire. Previously a Turin university graduation song, and popular among Italian soldiers during World War I, the song was called "Inno degli Arditi" (Hymn of the Arditi, a corps of the Italian Royal Army during World War I, whose members joined the fascist movement in large numbers). The hymn was further popularized by the mass rallies of Gabriele d'Annunzio in Fiume.

The version sung during the March on Rome was composed by G. Castaldo in 1921, using the original score by Giuseppe Blanc and words by Marcello Manni (beginning "Su compagni in forte schiere"). After the March on Rome, where it was sung, Mussolini commissioned Salvator Gotta to write the new lyrics, which were completed in 1924.

Gotta's version plays on fascist themes like youth and nationalism. Its reference to "Alighieri's vision" is an allusion to Dante Alighieri marking Italy's borders on the Quarnaro (Kvarner) Gulf, thus including the province of Istria, a territory granted to Italy after World War I.

There were new lyrics drafted in 1943 to fit the new republic. The lyrics were rewritten because the triumphant, happy tone of the old lyrics did not fit the tone of the 600 day long civil war ongoing in Italy at the time.

After the capitulation of Italy in 1943, the Allies suppressed the hymn in Italy. At the time, Italy had no national anthem, until "Il Canto degli Italiani" was provisionally chosen when Italy became a Republic on 12 October 1946, only to be officially legislated on 4 December 2017.

== Lyrics ==
=== 1909 lyrics ===
Italian lyrics Son finiti i tempi lieti degli studi e degli amori; o compagni in alto i cuori, il passato salutiam. È la vita una battaglia è il cammino irto d'inganni; ma siam forti, abbiam vent'anni, l'avvenire non temiam. Giovinezza, giovinezza, primavera di bellezza, della vita nell'asprezza il tuo canto squilla e va. Stretti stretti sotto braccio d'una piccola sdegnosa, trecce bionde, labbra rosa, occhi azzurri come il mar; Ricordare in primavera tra le verdi ombre dei tigli i crepuscoli vermigli i fantastici vagar. Giovinezza, giovinezza, primavera di bellezza, della vita nell'asprezza il tuo canto squilla e va. Salve, nostra adolescenza; te commossi salutiamo, per la vita ce ne andiamo, il tuo riso cesserà. Ma se un dì udremo un grido dei fratelli non redenti alla morte sorridenti il nemico ci vedrà. Giovinezza, giovinezza, primavera di bellezza, della vita nell'asprezza il tuo canto squilla e va.	English translation The happy times are over of studies and of love; O comrades, lift your hearts, let us salute the past. Life is a battle, the path is full of deceit; but we are strong, we are twenty, we do not fear the future. Youth, O youth, springtime of beauty, in life’s harshness your song rings out and goes. Arm in arm, close together, with a proud little maiden, blonde braids, rosy lips, eyes as blue as the sea; To remember in springtime the crimson twilights among the green shadows of the lindens, our fantastic wanderings. Youth, O youth, springtime of beauty, in life’s harshness your song rings out and goes. Hail, our adolescence; we greet you with emotion, we go forth into life, your laughter will cease. But if one day we hear a cry from unredeemed brothers, smiling at death, the enemy will see us. Youth, O youth, springtime of beauty, in life’s harshness your song rings out and goes.

=== 1922 lyrics ===
1922 version

Italian lyrics Su, compagni in forti schiere, Marciam verso l'avvenire, Siam falangi audaci e fiere, Pronte a osare, pronte a ardire. Trionfi alfine l'ideale, Per cui tanto combattemmo: Fratellanza nazionale D'italiana civiltà. Giovinezza, giovinezza, Primavera di bellezza, Nel Fascismo è la salvezza Della nostra libertà. Non più ignava nè avvilita Resti ancor la nostra gente, Si ridesti a nuova vita Di splendore più possente. Su, leviamo alta la face Che c'illumini il cammino, Nel lavoro e nella pace Sia la verà libertà. Giovinezza, giovinezza, Primavera di bellezza, Nel Fascismo è la salvezza Della nostra libertà. Nelle veglie di trincea, Cupo vento di mitraglia Ci ravvolse alla bandiera, Che agitammo alla battaglia. Vittoriosa al nuovo sole: Stretti a lei dobbiam lottare, È l'Italia che lo vuole, Per l'Italia vincerem! Giovinezza, giovinezza Primavera di bellezza, Nel Fascismo è la salvezza Della nostra libertà. Sorgi alfin lavoratore, Giunto è il dì della riscossa, Ti frodarono il sudore Con l'appello alla sommossa. Giù le bende ai traditori che ti strinsero a catena; alla gogna gl'impostori delle asiatiche virtù. Giovinezza, giovinezza, Primavera di bellezza, Nel Fascismo è la salvezza Della nostra libertà.	English translation Come on, comrades in strong ranks, Let us march toward the future, We are bold and proud phalanxes, Ready to venture, ready to dare. May the ideal triumph at last, For which we fought so much: National brotherhood Of Italian civilization. Youth, youth, Spring of beauty, In Fascism is the salvation Of our freedom. No more slothful nor disheartened Let our people still remain, May they wake to a new life Of a mightier splendour. Come on, let us raise high the torch That illuminates our path, In labour and in peace Let true freedom lie. Youth, youth, Spring of beauty, In Fascism is the salvation Of our freedom. In vigils of trenches, Dark wind of machine gun Wrapped us in the flag That we stirred to the battle. Victorious at the new sun, Close to her we must fight, It is Italy that wants this, For Italy we will win! Youth, youth, Spring of beauty, In Fascism is the salvation Of our freedom. Arise at last worker. Arrived is the day of revenge. They defrauded you of sweat With the call to riot. Down with the traitors' blindfolds Which reduce you to chains; To the pillory, the imposters Of Asian virtue. Youth, youth, Spring of beauty, In Fascism is the salvation Of our freedom.

=== 1924 lyrics ===
1924 version

Italian lyrics Salve o popolo di eroi, salve o Patria immortale, son rinati i figli tuoi con la fe' nell'ideale. Il valor dei tuoi guerrieri, la virtù dei pionieri, la vision dell'Alighieri, oggi brilla in tutti i cuor. 𝄆 Giovinezza, Giovinezza, Primavera di bellezza, della vita nell'asprezza il tuo canto squilla e va! 𝄇 Dell'Italia nei confini, son rifatti gli Italiani, li ha rifatti Mussolini per la guerra di domani. Per la gioia del lavoro, per la pace e per l'alloro, per la gogna di coloro che la Patria rinnegar. 𝄆 Giovinezza, Giovinezza, Primavera di bellezza, della vita nell'asprezza il tuo canto squilla e va! 𝄇 I poeti e gli artigiani, i signori e i contadini, con orgoglio d'Italiani giuran fede a Mussolini. Non v'è povero quartiere, che non mandi le sue schiere, che non spieghi le bandiere del Fascismo redentor. 𝄆 Giovinezza, Giovinezza, Primavera di bellezza, della vita nell'asprezza il tuo canto squilla e va! 𝄇	English translation Hail, people of heroes, hail, immortal Fatherland, your sons were born again with faith in the ideal. Your warriors' valour, the pioneers' virtue, Alighieri's vision, today shines in every heart. 𝄆 Youth, Youth, Spring of beauty, In the hardship of life Your song rings and goes! 𝄇 In the Italian borders, Italians have been remade, Mussolini has remade them For tomorrow's war. For the joy of labour, for peace and for the laurel, for the shame of those who have disowned our Fatherland. 𝄆 Youth, Youth, Spring of beauty, In the hardship of life Your song rings and goes! 𝄇 The poets and the artisans, the lords and the countrymen, with an Italian's pride swear loyalty to Mussolini. There is no poor neighbourhood, which does not send its ranks, which does not unfurl the flags of redeeming Fascism. 𝄆 Youth, Youth, Spring of beauty, In the hardship of life Your song rings and goes! 𝄇

=== 1943 lyrics ===
1943 Version

Italian lyrics Allorché dalla trincera suona l'ora di battaglia, sempre è prima Fiamma Nera che terribile si scaglia col pugnale nella mano con la fede dentro il cuore essa avanza, va lontano con la gloria e di valor! 𝄆 Giovinezza, giovinezza, Primavera di bellezza, Nel Fascismo è la salvezza della nostra civiltà! Per Benito Mussolini: Eja, eja, alalà! 𝄇 Del pugnale al fiero lampo della bomba al gran fragore, tutti avanti, tutti al campo: qui si vince oppur si muore! Sono giovane e son forte, non mi trema in petto il cuore: sorridendo vo alla morte pria d'andar al disonor! 𝄆 Giovinezza, giovinezza, Primavera di bellezza, Nel Fascismo è la salvezza della nostra civiltà! Per Benito Mussolini: Eja, eja, alalà! 𝄇 Col pugnale e colla bomba nella vita del terrore quando l'obice rimbomba non mi trema in petto il cuore. La mia splendida bandiera l'ho difesa con onore, è una fiamma tutta nera che divampa in ogni cuor! 𝄆 Giovinezza, giovinezza, Primavera di bellezza, Nel Fascismo è la salvezza della nostra civiltà! Per Benito Mussolini: Eja, eja, alalà! 𝄇	English translation When from the trench the hour of battle sounds always first is Black Flame lunging forward, fearsome with the dagger in hand with faith inside the heart it advances, it goes far with glory and valour! 𝄆 Youth, youth, Spring of beauty, In fascism lies the salvation of our civilization! For Benito Mussolini: Hip, hip hooray! 𝄇 From the dagger to the fierce flash of the great thunder bomb, all forward, all in the field: here you win or die! I am young and I am strong, my heart does not tremble in my chest: smiling at death before going to dishonor! 𝄆 Youth, youth, Spring of beauty, In fascism lies the salvation of our civilization! For Benito Mussolini: Hip, hip hooray! 𝄇 With the dagger and the bomb in the life of terror when the howitzer is booming my heart does not tremble. My beautiful flag I defended it with honor, it is a flame, completely black that blazes in every heart! 𝄆 Youth, youth, Spring of beauty, In fascism lies the salvation of our civilization! For Benito Mussolini: Hip, hip hooray! 𝄇

== Performances ==
"Giovinezza" was played "with the slightest pretext" at sporting events, films, and other public gatherings, and often carried adverse (even violent) consequences for those who did not join in. Even foreigners were roughed up by blackshirts if they failed to remove their hats and show respect when "Giovinezza" was played.

In the 1930s, "Giovinezza" was made the official anthem of the Italian army. The school day was required to be opened either with "Giovinezza" or "Balilla", the song of the Opera Nazionale Balilla. A faint, recorded version of the hymn played in the background of the Chapel of the Fascist Martyrs in the Exhibition of the Fascist Revolution.

There was a German song with German lyrics, set to the same tune as Giovinezza; "Hitlerleute" (Hitler's people) replacing "Giovinezza". A Japanese translation of Giovinezza, "黒シャツ党の歌" (lit. The song of blackshirts party) and "ファシストの歌" (lit. Fascist Song), was created in commemoration of the Tripartite Pact and used in Japanese overseas broadcasting.

Italian tenor Beniamino Gigli recorded "Giovinezza" in 1937, although the anthem is noticeably excluded from his "Edizione Integrale", released by EMI. "Giovinezza" followed the inauguration of the Fascist parliament in 1924 (following the Acerbo law) and preceded the Nazi radio broadcast announcing the creation of the Italian Social Republic.

"Giovinezza" was sung on 12 March 1939, the day of Pope Pius XII's coronation, by the Pope's Palatine Guard. After the last ceremony of his papal coronation was over Pius XII went to rest in the Lateran Palace. The singing occurred during a moment of public bonhomie between the Palatine Guards and the Italian Guards, "Palatine and Italian Guards exchanged courtesies, the former playing the fascist anthem, "Giovinezza" and the latter the papal hymn." This incident, which was not part of the coronation ceremony and took place without the knowledge or approval of Pope Pius XII is sometimes used to portray Pius XII as a crypto-fascist.

=== Toscanini ===
Arturo Toscanini (who had previously run as a Fascist parliamentary candidate in 1919 and whom Mussolini had called "the greatest conductor in the world") notably refused to conduct "Giovinezza" on multiple occasions. Toscanini had refused to play "Giovinezza" in Milan in 1922 and later in Bayreuth, which earned him accolades from anti-fascists throughout Europe. Mussolini did not attend the premiere of Puccini's Turandot on 25 April 1926 – having been invited by the management of La Scala – because Toscanini would not play Giovinezza before the performance. Finally, Toscanini refused to conduct "Giovinezza" at a May 1931 concert in Bologna, was subsequently roughed up by a group of blackshirts, and thereafter left Italy until after World War II.

== Relationship to Marcia Reale ==
The Royal March had often preceded "Giovinezza" on official occasions, as required by official regulations following an abortive attempt to conflate the two songs. Many considered the Royal March "long-winded and gaudy", and these faults were thrown into sharp relief by back-to-back ceremonial presentations. "Giovinezza" was used as a sign-off by Italian radio under Mussolini; after the ousting of Mussolini in 1943, the Italian radio signed off for the first time in 21 years playing only the Royal March, "Marcia Reale".

== See also ==
- Il Canto degli Italiani – the current Italian national anthem
- Faccetta Nera
- Horst-Wessel-Lied
- Cara al Sol
- Stornelli Legionari
