= Crepuscolari =

Italian poetic movement (early 20th century)

The Crepusculars (Italian: Poeti Crepuscolari, lit. 'Twilight Poets', pronounced [poˈɛti krepuskoˈlaːri]) were a group of Italian post-decadent poets whose work is notable for its use of musical and mood-conveying language and its general tone of despondency. The group's metaphorical name, coined in 1910 by literary critic Giuseppe Antonio Borgese to refer to a condition of decline, describes a number of poets whose melancholic writings were a response to the modernization of the early 20th century.

The Crepusculars were not a centrally organized movement, and the writers in this group of poets were active in three different regions the country: Carlo Chiaves, Guido Gozzano, Nino Oxilia, and Carlo Vallini in the Piedmont region of Northwest Italy; Corrado Govoni and Marino Moretti in the Romagna region of Northeast Italy; and Sergio Corazzini and Fausto Maria Martini in Rome.

Their attitude represents a reaction to the content-poetry and rhetorical style of (Nobel Prize–winning poet) Giosue Carducci and Gabriele D'Annunzio, favouring instead the unadorned language and homely themes typical of Giovanni Pascoli. These poets refuse to pursue the ‘poetic mission’, distinguishing themselves from the authors of the previous generation. Guido Gozzano famously defined himself as a “thing with two legs also known as guidogozzano”, almost as if he felt ashamed to play the role of an enlightened artist. An affinity existed with the French symbolists (see Paul Valéry, Arthur Rimbaud, and Stéphane Mallarmé). It has been said that Guido Gozzano was the most competent exponent of the movement.

The writer Guelfo Civinini is sometimes included as a member of the crepuscolari based on his 1901 work L'urna, but this has been contested by some scholars based on his other body of work.

== Period ==
Crepuscolars were active roughly between 1899, year of the release of Cesellature by Tito Marrone, and 1911, year that saw the publication of Colloqui by Guido Gozzano.

== See also ==
- Sergio Corazzini
- Corrado Govoni
- Guido Gozzano
- Gian Pietro Lucini
- Tito Marrone
- Marino Moretti
- Aldo Palazzeschi
- Carlo Vallini
- Futurism
- Nino Oxilia
- Antonia Pozzi
