= Luciana Peverelli =

Italian writer

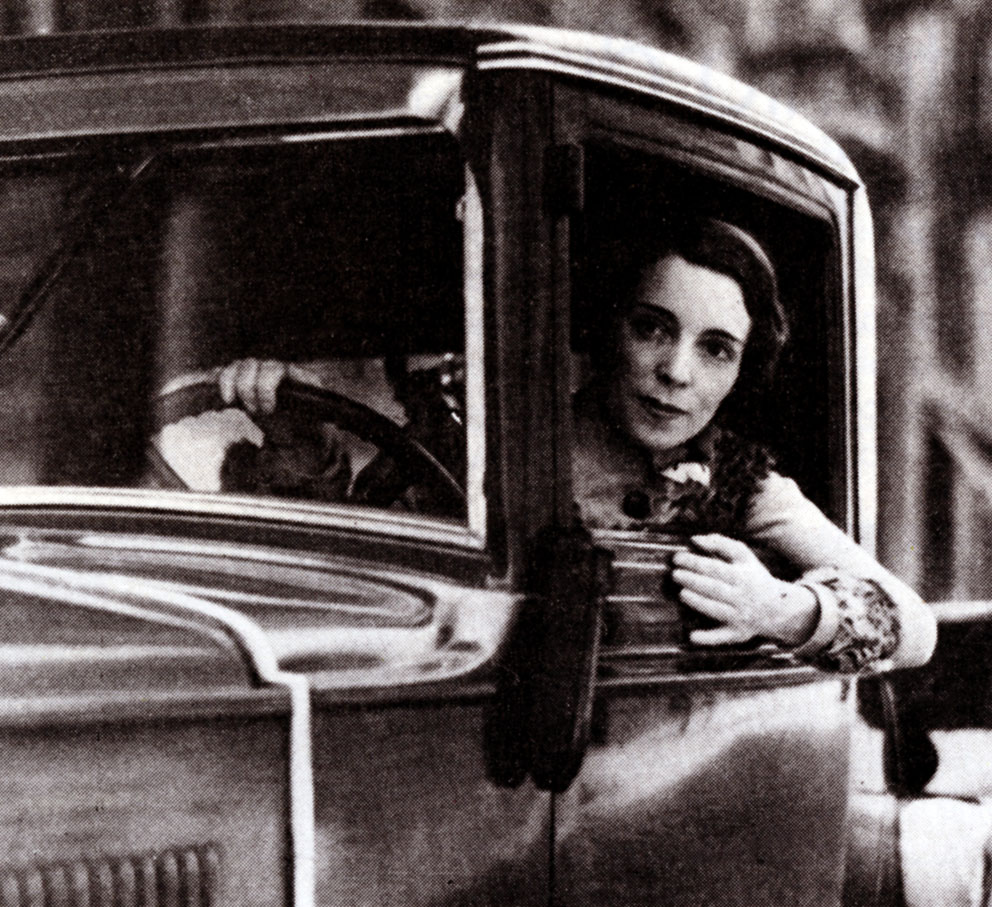
- Peverelli in 1933
- Born: 16 February 1902; Milan, Italy
- Died: 5 August 1986 (aged 84); Milan, Italy
- Occupation: Writer

Luciana Peverelli (16 February 1902 - 5 August 1986) was an Italian writer, journalist and screenwriter. She was also known under the pen names Greta Granor, Anna Luce and Mariely.

== Life and career ==
Born in Milan, Italy, the daughter of a music critic, Peverelli started her career as a playwright, but the commercial failure of her play La donna senza nome (1926) prompted her to abandon theatre and focus on literature. After writing some novellas and short stories, starting with her debut novel Signorine e giovanotti (1932), Peverelli successfully specialized in romance novels, characterized by a bourgeois setting, non-conformist leads and realistic situations, which later in her career were progressively influenced by feuilleton literature and by its gothic and melodramatic themes. In her prolific career, she wrote over 400 novels.

During her career, Peverelli collaborated with various newspapers including Il Tempo and La Gazzetta del Mezzogiorno, and with numerous women magazines, such as Lei, Amica, Novella and Grand Hotel, and was editor of the children's magazine Il Monello and of the film magazine Cinema Illustrazione. In 1947 she wrote the texts of the first fotoromanzo, Menzogne d'amore. In the 1940s and 1950s she also collaborated to the screenplays of several films, starting with Carlo Ludovico Bragaglia's Violets in Their Hair (1942). She was also a translator.

=== Personal life ===
An anti-fascist, Peverelli had a long relationship with footballer and resistenza member Henry Molinari. She later married and divorced the Briton Philip Ashley-Carter.
