= Sergio Corazzini =

Italian poet (1886–1907)

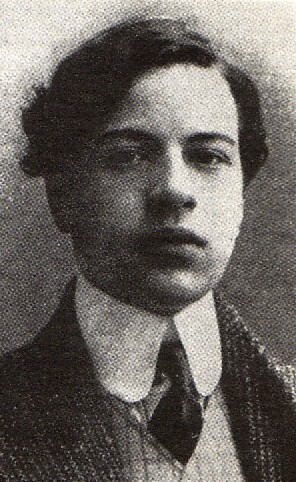
- Born: 6 February 1886; Rome, Italy
- Died: 17 June 1907 (aged 21); Rome, Italy

Sergio Corazzini (6 February 1886 – 17 June 1907) was an Italian poet, a member of the Crepuscolari movement.

== Biography ==
Born in Rome into a wealthy family, Corazzini formed at the Collegio Umberto I, where he was passionate author and director of the college's puppet theater. Because of his family's economic difficulties due to his father's reckless speculations on the stock market and to his mother's disease, he was forced to leave the college and to work in an insurance company.

Awareness of Corazzini's poetry began in 1902, when his verses started to be regularly published in the magazine Pasquino de Roma (later Marforio). His first poetic collection, Dolcezze, was released in 1904, and was shortly later followed by L'amaro calice, which got critical acclaim and critical comparisons to Stéphane Mallarmé, Francis Jammes and Jules Laforgue, among others. In 1905 Corazzini founded the short-lived literary magazine Cronache latine, wrote his only drama play Il traguardo, and released a third poetry collection, Le aureole.

Thematically, Corazzini’s poems are quite monotonous: they mainly focus on feelings of self-pity to present an image of the author as a ‘sick child’, just waiting for death, but, stylistically, they exhibit a vibrant experimentalism and sometimes they are written in free verse.

Seriously ill with tuberculosis, in 1906 he moved to Nocera Umbra, before being hospitalized at the Nettuno sanatorium in autumn of the same year. In sanatorium he started an unfinished translation of Joséphin Péladan's Sémiramis and kept composing poetries, partly collected in Libro per la sera della domenica. In 1907 he eventually returned in his home in Rome, where he died on 17 June 1907, aged 21 years old.

== Works ==
- Dolcezze. Tipografia operaia romana, Rome, 1904.
- L'amaro calice. Tipografia operaia romana, Rome, 1904.
- Le aureole. Tipografia operaia romana, Rome, 1905.
- Piccolo libro inutile. Tipografia operaia romana, Rome, 1906. (also includes poetries of Alberto Tarchiani)
- Elegia.Frammento. Tipografia operaia romana, Rome, 1906
- Libro per la sera della domenica. Tipografia operaia romana, Rome, 1906.
- Liriche. Ricciardi, Naples, 1909.
