= Fausto Maria Martini =

Italian poet and playwright (1886–1931)

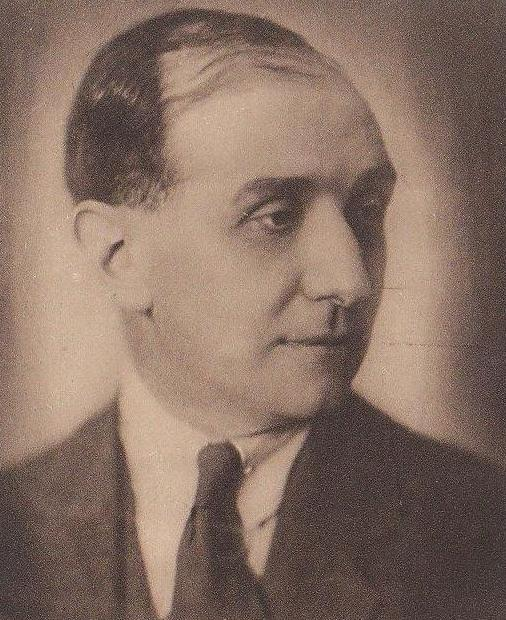
Fausto Maria Martini

Fausto Maria Martini (14 April 1886, in Rome – 12 April 1931, in Rome) was an Italian poet, playwright, and literary critic of the Crepuscolari school of poets, best remembered for his play Ridi, Pagliaccio (1919), which was made into the film Laugh, Clown, Laugh (1928), his collection of poetry that became the 1915 silent film Rapsodia satanica, and his play Cortile which was made into the film Courtyard (1931).
