= Guido Gozzano =

Italian poet and writer (1883–1916)

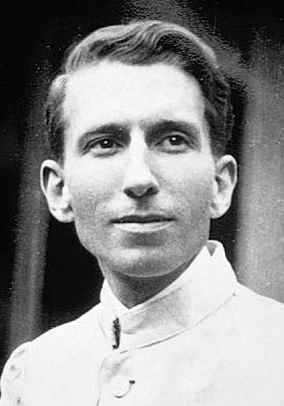
- Born: Guido Gustavo Gozzano; 19 December 1883; Turin, Kingdom of Italy
- Died: 9 August 1916 (aged 32); Turin, Kingdom of Italy
- Occupations: Poet, writer
- Writing career
- Literary movement: Crepuscolari

Guido Gustavo Gozzano (Italian: [ˈɡwiːdo ɡodˈdzaːno]; 19 December 1883 – 9 August 1916) was an Italian poet and writer.

== Biography ==
He was born in Turin, the son of Fausto Gozzano, an engineer, and of Diodata Mautino, the daughter of Senator Mautino, patriot and supporter of Giuseppe Mazzini and Massimo D'Azeglio. He spent his life in Turin and in Agliè (in the Canavese area), where his family owned several buildings and a large estate: Villa Il Meleto.

Of delicate health (but nevertheless practising sports such as ice-skating, cycling, and swimming), he completed primary school with mediocre results, and attended Liceo classico Cavour; in 1903, after secondary school, he studied law at the University of Turin but never graduated, preferring to attend the crepuscolari torinesi, i.e. literature lessons by poet Arturo Graf, who was well-liked by the young men of letters.

Graf exercised great influence over Gozzano. His Leopardi-inspired pessimism was mitigated by a spiritualistic form of socialism, a combination which young Turinese intellectuals (who saw in his thought an "antidote" to the style of Gabriele D'Annunzio) particularly favoured. Graf helped Gozzano depart from D'Annunzio's canon, which imbued his early work, by "going back to the sources" and devoting himself to a thorough study of the poetry of Dante Alighieri and Francesco Petrarca, which helped refine his poetic sensibility.

In May 1907 Gozzano's weak health suddenly worsened due to severe pleurisy, which forced the poet to spend the remainder of his solitary life on the Italian Riviera (mostly San Giuliano d'Albaro) and in mountain towns (Ceresole Reale, Ronco, Bertesseno, Fiery).

1907 was also the year when his affair with young poet Amalia Guglielminetti began, originally as an exchange of letters—the two had originally met while attending the Società di Cultura. Their love letters, exchanged in 1907-1909 but first published in 1951 as Lettere, reveal a profoundly tender love, which Gozzano at times tried to shirk away from, preferring a safer "literary comradeship".

In the same year Gozzano's first collection of poems (written between 1904 and 1907), La via del rifugio, appeared under the imprint of the Turin publisher Streglio.

In 1909 Gozzano gave up law studies altogether and devoted himself completely to poetry. Two years later, he published his opus magnum, the book I colloqui (literally "Conversations"), with the Milanese publisher Treves. The poems therein are in three sections, titled Il giovenile errore (lit. "The youthful error"), Alle soglie (lit. "At the threshold"), and Il reduce (lit. "The survivor"). "I colloqui" met much success with critics and readers, and prompted several offers of collaboration with important magazines and newspapers, among which were La Stampa, La Lettura, and La Donna. The latter provided Gozzano with a fertile forum to publish both prose and poetry.

"I Colloqui” includes “La signorina Felicita ovvero la Felicità”, probably the most renowned work ever written by Gozzano . In this long poem, the author evokes his feelings for Felicita, an ordinary girl, who describes resorting to figurative art aesthetics, as a «flemish beauty», in pure post-decadent style. In this poem, the author deals with many of his work's usual themes (his health condition, his pessimistic worldview, his yearning to visit far and exotic countries) in his trademark witty and ironic manner.

Gozzano's worsening health prompted the decision to travel to India and Ceylon, looking for a climate more suited to his breathing impairment. His cruise ship left Genoa on 16 February 1912, returning in May 1913 after visits to Colombo and Bombay. He did not get better, but the travel, together with extensive reading, inspired the texts that were to be collected and posthumously published (in 1917) under the title Verso la cuna del mondo (lit., "Towards the world's cradle").

The last years of Gozzano's life yielded little literary production. In March 1914, he published on La Stampa some fragments of the long poem Le Farfalle (lit. "The butterflies"), also known as Epistole entomologiche (lit. "Entomological epistles"), which he would never complete. The collection of six fairy tales he had written for the children's magazine Corriere dei Piccoli, titled I tre talismani (lit. "The three talismans"), was also published at this time. An avid theatre and movie fan, Gozzano adapted some of his short stories for production. Between 1914 and 1915 he composed a few unremarkable poems about World War I, which met little success with his audience.

In 1916, shortly before his death, Gozzano began writing the script for a film about Francis of Assisi, which was never filmed. The poet was laid to rest in Agliè. He was an atheist.

== Works ==
=== Poetry ===
- La via del rifugio (1907)
- I colloqui (1911)
- Tutte le poesie (editor A. Rocca, ed., introduction by M. Guglielminetti; 1980. Includes all Gozzano's poems)

=== Prose ===
- I tre talismani (1914)
- La principessa si sposa. Fiabe (1918)
- Verso la cuna del mondo. Lettere dall'India (1912-1913) (with preface by G.A. Borgese, 1917, first edition)
- L'altare del passato (1918)
- L'ultima traccia (1919)
- Primavere romantiche (1924)
- La moneta seminata e altri scritti con un saggio di varianti e una scelta di documenti (F. Antonicelli, ed.; 1968)
- Journey Toward the Cradle of Mankind (The Marlboro Press / Northwestern, Evanston, Illinois, translated by David Newton Marinelli, 1996, 156 pp., ISBN 0-8101-6007-2, ISBN 0-8101-6008-0.
- Verso la Cuna del mondo - Lettere dall'India (Flaminio di Biagi, ed., with afterword by Giorgio Bàrberi Squarotti, 2005; first complete edition)
- Requiems & Nightmares (2015)

=== Letters ===
- Lettere d'amore di Guido Gozzano e Amalia Guglielminetti (S. Asciamprener, ed., 1951)
- Lettere a Carlo Vallini con altri inediti (Giorgio Di Rienzo, ed., 1971)

== Sources ==
- Some biographical and bibliographical details come from the Fabbri edition of Gozzano's poems (Guido Gozzano, Poesie, introduzione e note di Giorgio Barberi Squarotti, BUR/Fabbri 1997).
- W. Vaccari, La vita e i pallidi amori di Guido Gozzano, Milano, Omnia editrice, 1958.
- Flaminio Di Biagi, Sotto l'arco di Tito: le "Farfalle" di Guido Gozzano, Trento, La Finestra editrice 1999.
- Marina Rota, Amalia, se Voi foste uomo... Golem Ed., Turin, 2016
- Patrick Worsnip, Sleeping with Gozzano, PN Review, Issue 229, Manchester May–June 2016, pp. 41–45
