= Ferdinando Maria Poggioli =

Italian film director, film editor and screenwriter

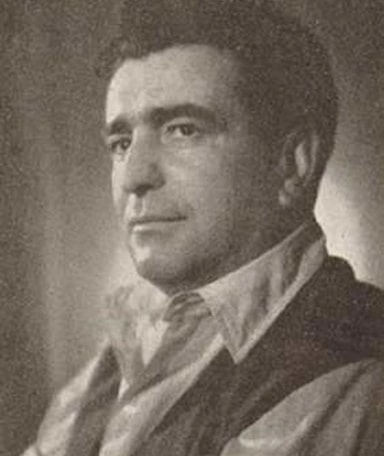
- Born: 15 December 1897; Bologna, Emilia-Romagna, Italy
- Died: 2 February 1945 (aged 47); Rome, Lazio, Italy
- Occupations: Director; Editor; Screenwriter
- Years active: 1930–1944

Ferdinando Maria Poggioli (15 December 1897 – 2 February 1945) was an Italian screenwriter, film editor and director. He directed fifteen films including the 1940 melodrama Goodbye Youth. He had previously worked as assistant director on a number of films during the 1930s. He committed suicide in 1945.

== Selected filmography ==
=== Director ===
- Bayonet (1936)
- Wealth Without a Future (1939)
- Goodbye Youth (1940)
- Jealousy (1942)
- Yes, Madam (1942)
- The Taming of the Shrew (1942)
- The Materassi Sisters (1944)
- The Priest's Hat (1944)

=== Editor ===
- The Blue Fleet (1932)
- The Joker King (1935)
- King of Diamonds (1936)
- Tomb of the Angels (1937)
- Princess Tarakanova (1938)
- Tonight at Eleven (1938)
- Diamonds (1939)

== Bibliography ==
- Gundle, Stephen. Mussolini's Dream Factory: Film Stardom in Fascist Italy. Berghan Books, 2013.
- Moliterno, Gino. Historical Dictionary of Italian Cinema. Scarecrow Press, 2008.
