= Salvator Gotta =

Italian writer (1887–1980)

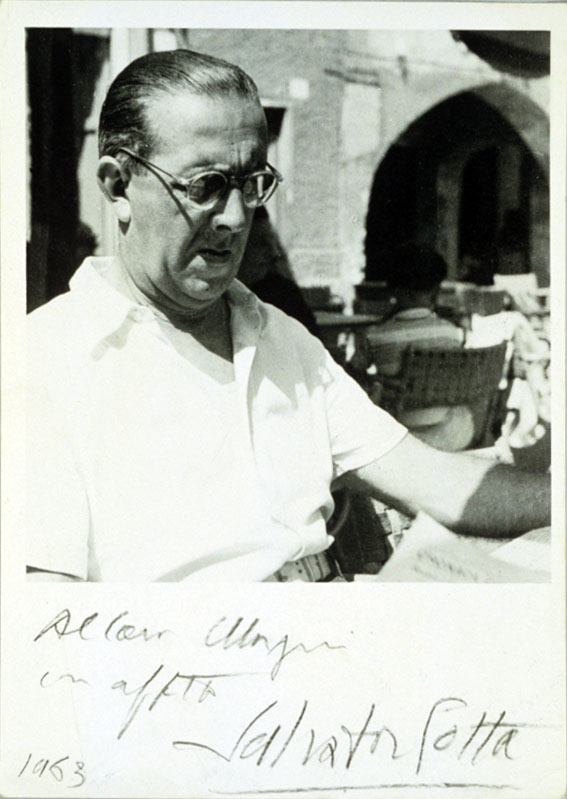
- Born: 18 May 1887; Montalto Dora, Piedmont, Italy
- Died: 7 June 1980 (aged 93); Rapallo, province of Genoa, Liguria, Italy
- Education: University of Turin
- Occupations: Novelist; playwright; screenplay writer; children's writer
- Writing career
- Language: Italian

Salvator Gotta (or Salvatore Gotta; 18 May 1887 – 7 June 1980) was an Italian writer. He was best known as a prolific novelist, but he was also a biographer, playwright, screenplay writer, and writer of children's books.

== Life and work ==
Gotta was born on the 18 May 1887 in Montalto Dora, Piedmont, Italy. He graduated from the University of Turin, and his literary career started with the publication of Pia in 1912. Other novels followed, and in 1917 he started on the trilogy La saga dei Vela, which was to become his best known work. During the first world war he served in the Alpini Corps, and from this experience in 1926 he wrote the children's novel Il piccolo Alpino (The little Alpino), which was very successful and inspired the 1986 Italian TV mini-series Mino.

Gotta joined the Fascist party at an early stage, and in 1925 he wrote the words of the official Fascist anthem Giovinezza ("Youth"). He praised the fascists in several of his works, such as Mistica Patria (Mystic Country), of 1932.

He wrote film screenplays and stage plays, such as Mille lire (1923) and La damigella di Bard (1936). He continued to write novels after the second world war, but his works from this period are now little remembered, and many of his works were allowed to go out of print because of his Fascist associations. However, he had some popularity among teenagers in the 1960s and 1970s for his historical novels and a column he wrote in the magazine Topolino.

Gotta was influenced by the realists, and by Antonio Fogazzaro. Gotta and Fogazzaro were both published by Baldini & Castoldi.

Gotta wrote his autobiography, L'almanacco di Gotta ("Gotta's Almanac"). He died on the 7 June 1980 at Rapallo in the province of Genoa, Liguria, Italy.

== Selected filmography ==
- Cavalry (1936)
- Goodbye Youth (1940)
