= Andrea Habay =

French actor

- Born: 1883; Paris, France
- Died: 1941 (aged 57–58); Rome, Lazio, Italy
- Other name: André Habay
- Occupation: Actor
- Years active: 1914–1927 (film)

Andrea Habay (1883–1941) was a French film actor. Habay appeared in more forty films during the silent era, mostly in Italy. He also directed three films during the early 1920s. He played the role of Petronius in the 1924 epic Quo Vadis, one of his final films.

== Selected filmography ==
=== Actor ===
- Carmen (1914)
- Blue Blood (1914)
- Avatar (1916)
- La falena (1916)
- Ivan the Terrible (1917)
- The Princess of Baghdad (1918)
- Tortured Soul (1919)
- The Redemption (1924)
- Quo Vadis (1924)
- Maciste in the Lion's Cage (1926)
- The Giant of the Dolomites (1927)

== Bibliography ==
- Dalle Vacche, Angela. Diva: Defiance and Passion in Early Italian Cinema. University of Texas Press, 2008.
- Scodel, Ruth & Bettenworth, Anja. Whither Quo vadis?. Wiley-Blackwell, 2009.
