= Sandro Camasio =

Italian journalist and playwright

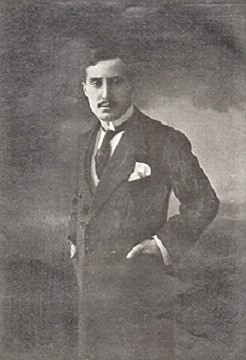
- Born: Alessandro Camasio; 5 April 1889; Turin, Piedmont, Kingdom of Italy
- Died: 23 June 1913 (aged 24); Turin, Piedmont, Kingdom of Italy
- Occupations: Journalist and playwright

Alessandro "Sandro" Camasio (5 April 1886 – 23 June 1917) was an Italian journalist and playwright. He first studied jurisprudence in his native Turin, but started out as a journalist for the Gazzetta di Torino and Gazzetta del Popolo. He joined Nino Oxilia in writing dramatic works, starting with the work Zingara and Addio giovinezza (Goodbye Youth). Some of his works were later converted into films. He died unexpectedly from meningitis.

== Biography ==
Sandro Camasio was the son of a Registry Office official. He graduated from law school in Turin but his passion was theater. He became society editor of the Turin Gazette. He wrote some plays until, in collaboration with Nino Oxilia, he achieved success with the comedy Addio giovinezza!, first staged at Milan's Teatro Manzoni on 27 March 1911, directed by Camasio himself. In collaboration again with Oxilia and Nino Berrini, he wrote the satirical theatrical Revue Cose dell'altro mondo, which was also successful.He also tried his hand as a director with some films including L'antro funesto (1913).

He died in the hospital following an attack of Meningitis.
