= The Merry Farmer =

The Merry Farmer (German:Der fidele Bauer) may refer to:

- The Merry Farmer (operetta), a 1907 operetta by Leo Fall and Viktor Léon
- The Merry Farmer (1927 film), a German silent film adaptation
- The Merry Farmer (1951 film), an Austrian film adaptation
