= The Priest from Kirchfeld =

The Priest from Kirchfeld may refer to:

- Der Pfarrer von Kirchfeld (The Priest from Kirchfeld), an anti-clerical folkplay by Ludwig Anzengruber
- The Priest from Kirchfeld (1914 film), a 1914 Austrian silent film
- The Priest from Kirchfeld (1926 film), a 1926 German silent film
- The Priest from Kirchfeld (1937 film), a 1937 Austrian film
- The Priest from Kirchfeld (1955 film), a 1955 West German drama film
