= The Priest of Kirchfeld =

Play written by Ludwig Anzengruber

The Priest of Kirchfeld (German: Der Pfarrer von Kirchfeld) is an anti-clerical folkplay by Ludwig Anzengruber in Viennese dialect, first produced 5 November 1870 in Vienna. It is Anzengruber's most popular drama. It has been adapted for film several times.

== Plot ==
The scene is laid just outside Austria in the most conservative portion of Old Bavaria among a simple peasantry “whose passions, expressed without reservation or but clumsily concealed” were a novel revelation of human nature to theatregoers. Priest Hell (“Bright”) and his feudal adversary, Count Finsterberg (“Dark-mountain”), reveal by their very names the nature of the conflict which is precipitated by Hell's innocent gift of a little gold cross to his ward, the orphaned, penniless Annerl. This gives the vagabond Wurselsepp an opportunity to ruin the priest with his parish as an expression of hatred caused by ecclesiastical prevention of his union to a Lutheran girl 20 years before. In one scene of the play, Hell converts and wins the friendship of this enemy when he permits the burial of Wurzelsepp's suicide mother in consecrated ground. But this employment of his own judgment against the law of the Roman Catholic Church loses for him his parish.

Though a member of the “church militant and regnant,” Hell had sought, like the “Monk of Wittenberg,” for a way short of the requirement to inquire “May I do it, just as I mean it?”, a way which makes men “indifferent or apostate.” Herein lies a part of the tragedy of his position. However, he becomes no champion of the “Away from Rome” movement, which later gained such strength. He conquers self, and submits. More tragic, almost to the point of suicide, is his love for Annerl, who also learns resignation like all Austrians, by giving hand and allegiance to the peasant, Michel. This soul conflict, rather than the politico-religious purpose, has been cited as the greatest source of appeal for the play.

== Effect ==
The play raised a struggling unknown author to fame. This has been attributed to the play's freshness and inherent excellence, and also to the play's voicing of popular feelings in regard to the celibacy of the clergy, mixed unions, enforced civil marriage and the relation of church and state as affected by the declaration of papal infallibility in 1870 (see First Vatican Council).

== Productions, editions, criticism ==
First produced in the Folktheatre “an der Wien,” it gradually found its way over all German-speaking lands, being played 632 times between 1899 and 1905. The text for the play can be found in volume VI of Anzengruber's Gesammelte Werke (“Collected Works,” 1898). For a critique, see Sigismund Friedmann, Ludwig Anzengruber (Leipzig, 1902).

== Film adaptations ==
- The Priest from Kirchfeld (1914, directed by Jakob Fleck and Luise Fleck), starring Ludwig Trautmann, Max Neufeld.
- The Priest from Kirchfeld (1926, directed by Jakob Fleck and Luise Fleck), starring William Dieterle, Fritz Kampers.
- The Priest from Kirchfeld (1937, directed by Jakob Fleck and Luise Fleck), starring Hans Jaray, Ludwig Stössel.
- Das Mädchen vom Pfarrhof (1955, directed by Alfred Lehner), starring Waltraut Haas, Erich Auer.
- The Priest from Kirchfeld (1955, directed by Hans Deppe), starring Ulla Jacobsson and Claus Holm.
