= Friedrich Graetz =

Austrian illustrator and cartoonist (1842–1912)

- Friedrich Grätz
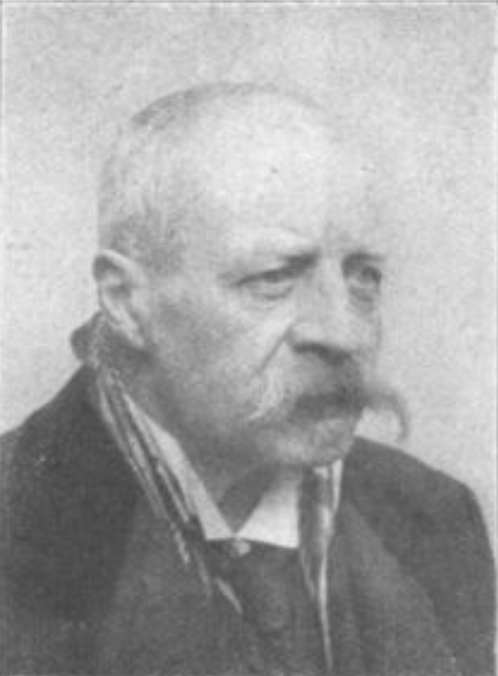
- Born: April 3, 1842; Frankfurt am Main
- Died: November 28, 1912 (aged 70); Vienna, Austria
- Known for: Puck cartoons

Friedrich Graetz or Grätz (April 3, 1842, Frankfurt – November 28, 1912 Vienna) was an Austrian illustrator and cartoonist. His best-known works appeared in Viennese satirical magazines such as Kikeriki and Der Floh, and in the American magazine Puck. Puck was the first magazine to print cartoons in color. Many of Graetz's cartoons were political, targeting issues of government responsibility and public health and urging social change.

== Career ==
Graetz studied art in Frankfurt am Main with Eduard von Steinle. In 1867 Graetz came to Vienna, spending time also in Budapest.

=== Vienna ===
Graetz worked for the satirical weekly Kikeriki ("Cock-a-doodle-doo") in Vienna between 1872 and 1875, and for Der Floh ("The Flea"), also in Vienna, beginning in 1875. Both magazines were printed by the publishing house Johann Nepomuk Vernay.

Kikeriki was edited by Ottokar Franz Ebersberg, under the pseudonym O. F. Berg. In its early years, Kikeriki used humour to critique authority and call for social change. It has been suggested that over time humour in Kikeriki and other Viennese newspapers shifted, becoming less an appeal to improve city life, and more an attempt to cope with its stresses by "keeping up a cheerful spirit". Their humour also became increasingly distanced and negative toward marginalized groups, including women and Jewish people.

=== Puck ===
Graetz was hired by Joseph Keppler on a three-year contract, to work for the popular magazine Puck in New York. Keppler, who was also from Austria, established the German-language magazine in 1871, publishing the first English-language edition in 1877. Graetz's illustrations appear in Puck between March 1882 and March 1885. Graetz's images, like those of Joseph Keppler and Carl Edler von Stur in Puck, depict complex scenes in which a number of characters are involved in unfolding action.

In Puck, as in the early Kikeriki, humor was intentionally used to press for both political and social change. Topics reflected the interests and political positions of Keppler and other senior staff, and Keppler closely reviewed others' work before it went to publication, influencing both content and style with "a strong guiding hand". Among the areas of public health addressed by Friedrich Graetz's cartoons in Puck are unsanitary conditions; disease, quarantine and immigration; and adulteration of foodstuffs.

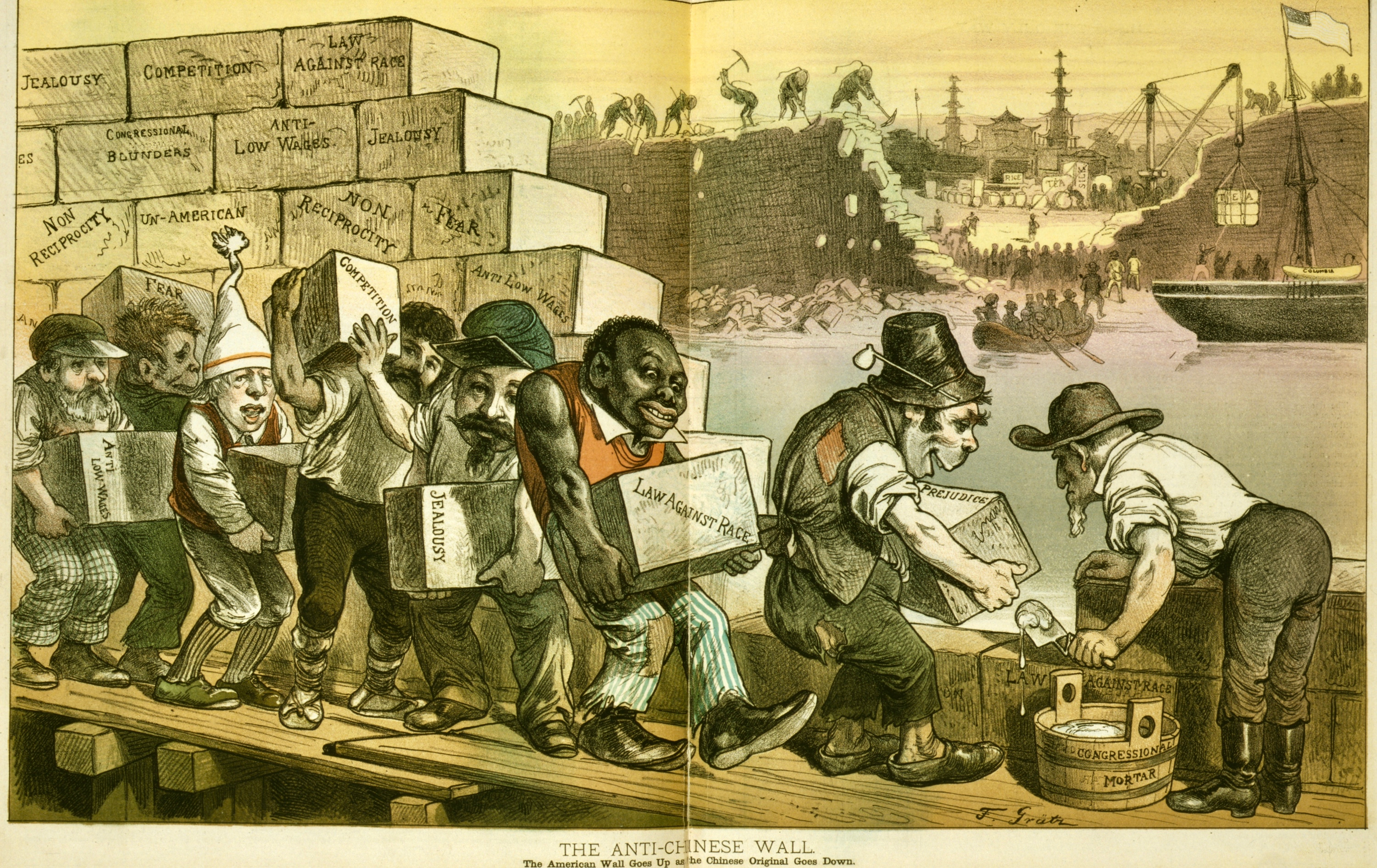
"The Anti-Chinese Wall", March 29, 1882

Graetz's cartoon "The Anti-Chinese Wall: The American wall goes up as the Chinese original goes down" caricatures a group including Irish, African American, French, and Jewish laborers. They are shown building a wall against the Chinese at the same time that the Chinese are removing their own barriers to trade. The lettering on the blocks includes "Fear", "Non Reciprocity", "Law Against Race" and "Congressional Blunders". Congress had passed the Chinese Exclusion Act in 1882, and was manipulating prejudice and fear against minority groups to support anti-Chinese trade policies. Graetz's cartoon has been used to examine recurring political debates across time.

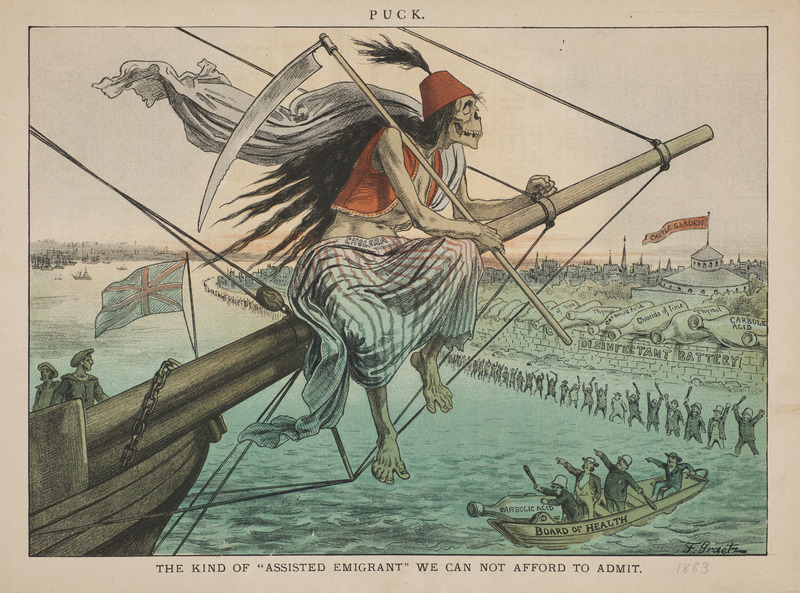
"The Kind of 'Assisted Emigrant' We Can Not Afford to Admit", Puck, July 18, 1883

Cholera was particularly feared for its high rate of mortality, and because its cause of infection was not yet known. A major epidemic was occurring in Egypt at the time this cartoon was drawn. Graetz's illustration "The Kind of 'Assisted Emigrant' We Can Not Afford to Admit" personifies cholera as a skeletal invader in the foreground of the cartoon, but does not demonize or blame immigrants. The deadly disease is opposed by an array of tiny figures: a boat representing the Board of Health, cannons loaded with carbolic acid, thymol and chloride of lime, and a frail line of human defenders. The building in the illustration has been identified as Castle Clinton, an immigrant processing center in the Battery Park area of New York City.

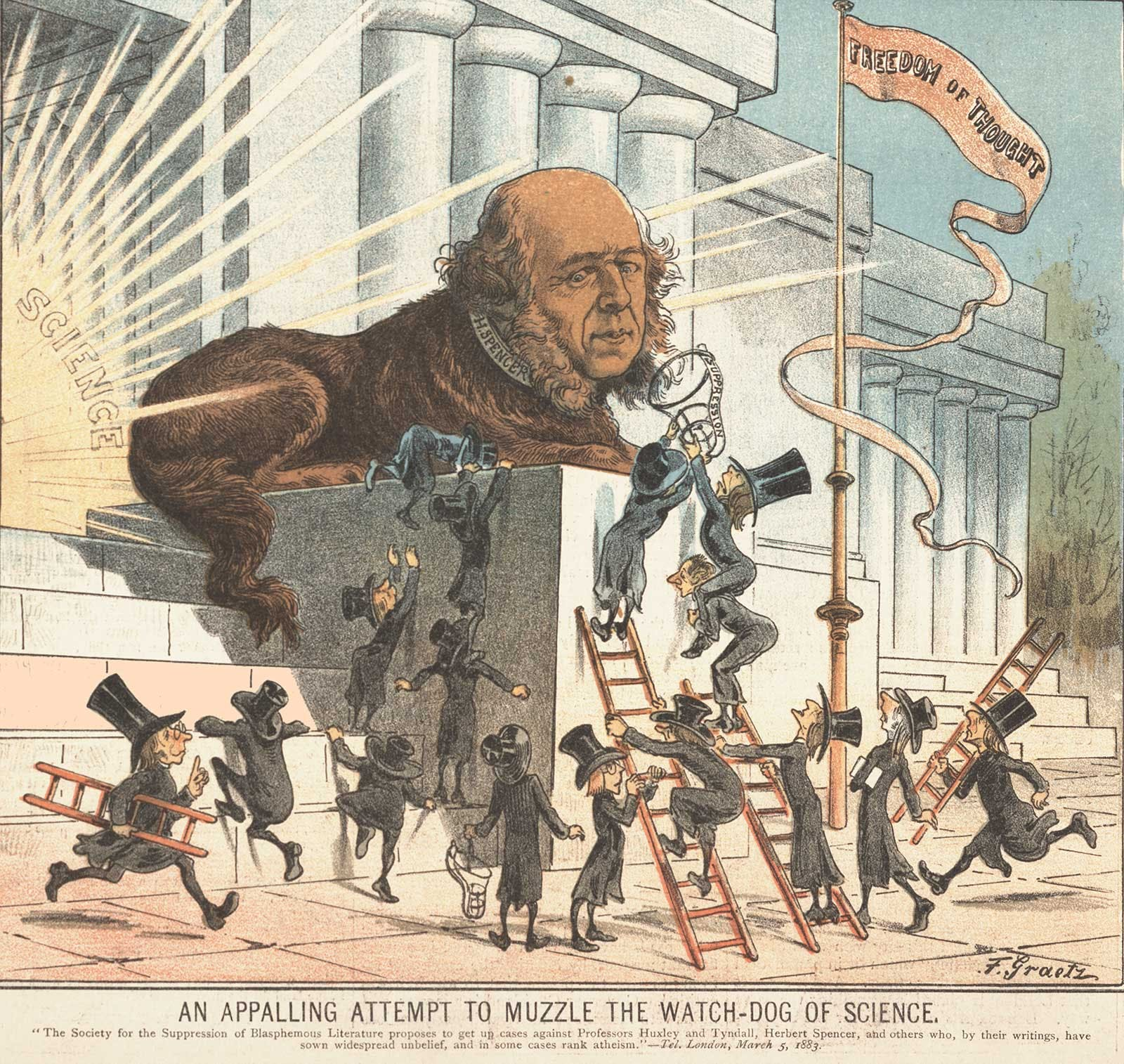
"An appalling attempt to muzzle the watch-dog of science", March 14, 1883

A flag entitled "Freedom of thought" flies above the conflict in Friedrich Graetz's cartoon "An appalling attempt to muzzle the watch-dog of science" (1883). The caption notes that The Society for the Suppression of Blasphemous Literature proposed to prosecute professors such as physicist John Tyndall, biologist Thomas Henry Huxley, and sociologist Herbert Spencer for sowing "widespread unbelief, and in some cases rank atheism" through the expression of their views on science and religion. In the cartoon, Spencer is shown as a monumental dog, guarding the doors of scientific enlightenment. His detractors surround him with muzzles.

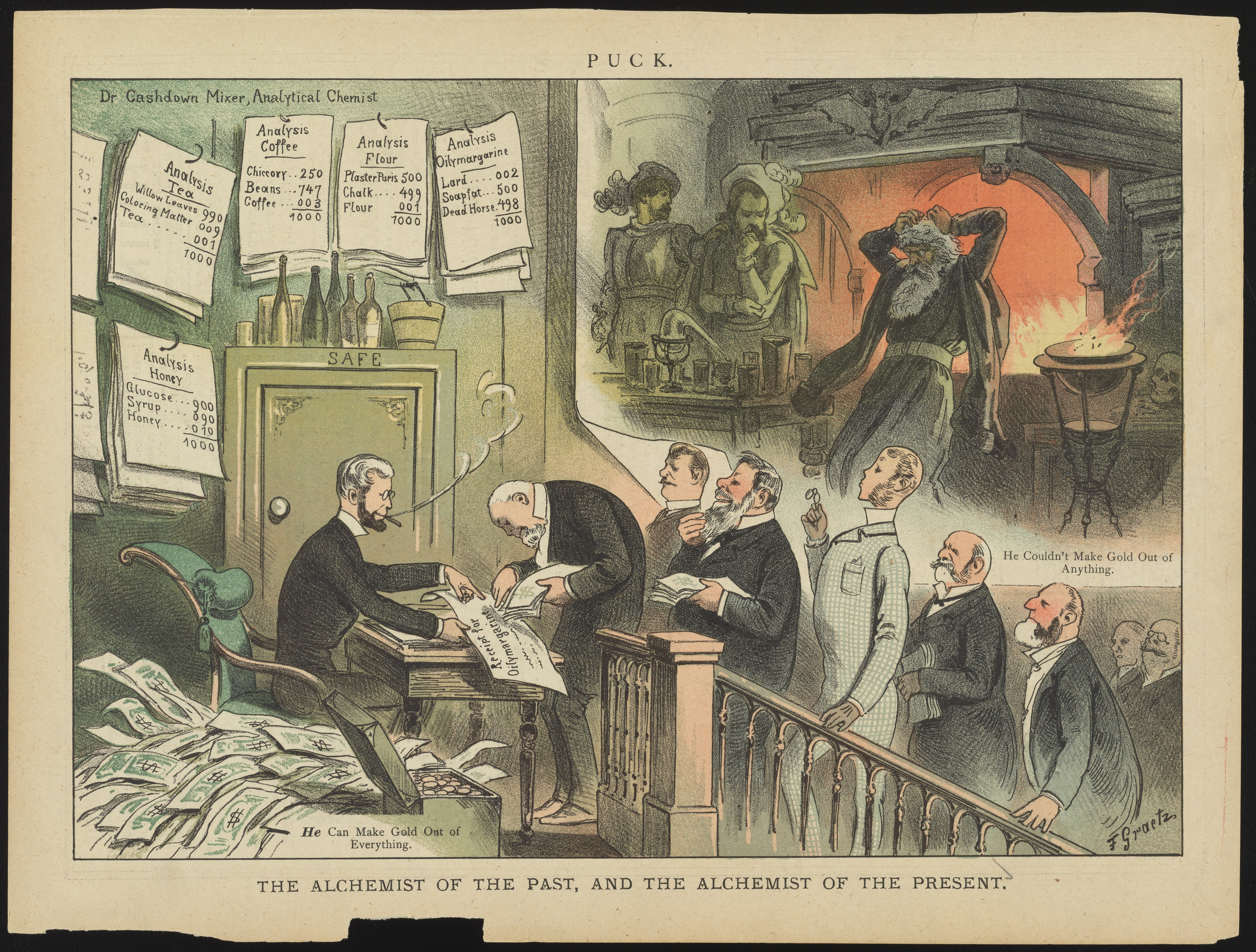
"The Alchemist of the Past, and the Alchemist of the Present", April 2, 1884

Graetz's cartoon "The Alchemist of the Past, and the Alchemist of the Present" targeted food adulteration practices by commercial chemists and hinted at the need for regulation, as a matter of public health. The Alchemist of the Past, as noted in the illustration, could not make gold out of anything, but the Alchemist of the Present profits by making things out of almost everything. In the cartoon "Dr. Cashdown Mixer, Analytical Chemist" is collecting payments from a number of well-dressed gentlemen, while above him on the wall are the results of some of his work, "Analysis Tea," "Analysis Coffee," and "Analysis Oilymargarine". "Coffee" is listed as consisting predominantly of chicory and beans, while "flour" consists almost entirely of plaster of paris and chalk.

Eugene Zimmerman recalls Graetz as "an elderly gentleman with short-cropped hair and abundant red whiskers." Zimmerman considered Graetz to be "an excellent pen-and-ink artist but too careful in detail for an American comic paper". Graetz was unfamiliar with American politics, and was often given topics dealing with international affairs. Because he spoke little or no English, proposed work had to be described to him extremely precisely by a German-speaking staff member. While Keppler was travelling abroad for six months in 1883, Zimmerman acted as Graetz's translator.

Keppler and his staff, as caricatured by himself. Graetz wears a toga.

Keppler caricatured himself and his staff in "The return of the 'prodigal father' at the 'Puck" office'", a cartoon published on October 10, 1883. Graetz is portrayed among the members of the art department, to the left of Keppler. He is dressed in a toga as the Greek painter Apelles.

Over time, Graetz drew fewer lithographs. Zimmermam became increasingly skilled, and was seen by Keppler and his partner Adolph Schwarzmann as a possible replacement. Keppler, however, felt uncomfortable about firing his friend. According to Zimmerman, when it was time to renew Graetz's contract, the proprietors of Puck proposed to cut Graetz's salary in half. Humiliated, he chose to leave and return to Europe. A few months later, Zimmerman left Puck as well.

=== Europe ===
Two other similarly named artists were active in Austria and Germany during Friedrich Graetz's lifetime (1842–1912). Friedrich Graetz has been credited with publishing during the periods 1885–1891 in Lustigen Blätter ("Funny Leaves", Hamburg and Berlin) and 1896–1897 in Der Wahre Jacob (Stuttgart, Germany). However, Ursula E. Koch and others identify the author of anti-Semitic cartoons in Lustigen Blätter and Der Wahre Jacob as Fritz Graetz (1875–1915). Georg Friedrich "Fritz" Grätz or Graetz (1875–1915) was also from Frankfurt am Main, and signed paintings as "Fritz Grätz".

A report of Friedrich Graetz's death credits him with publishing in Fliegende Blätter ("Flying Leaves", Munich, Germany). German artist Theodor Grätz (1859–1947) is known to have drawn cartoons for Fliegende Blätter, signing himself "Th. Grätz".

Sample signatures for the three artists are shown below:

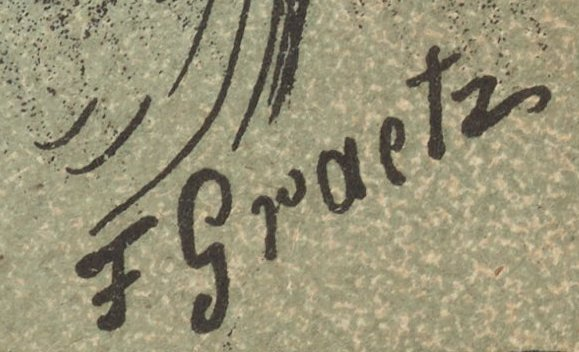
Friedrich Graetz (1842–1912), from Puck, 1884

Georg Friedrich "Fritz" Grätz (1875–1915), from painting, 1904

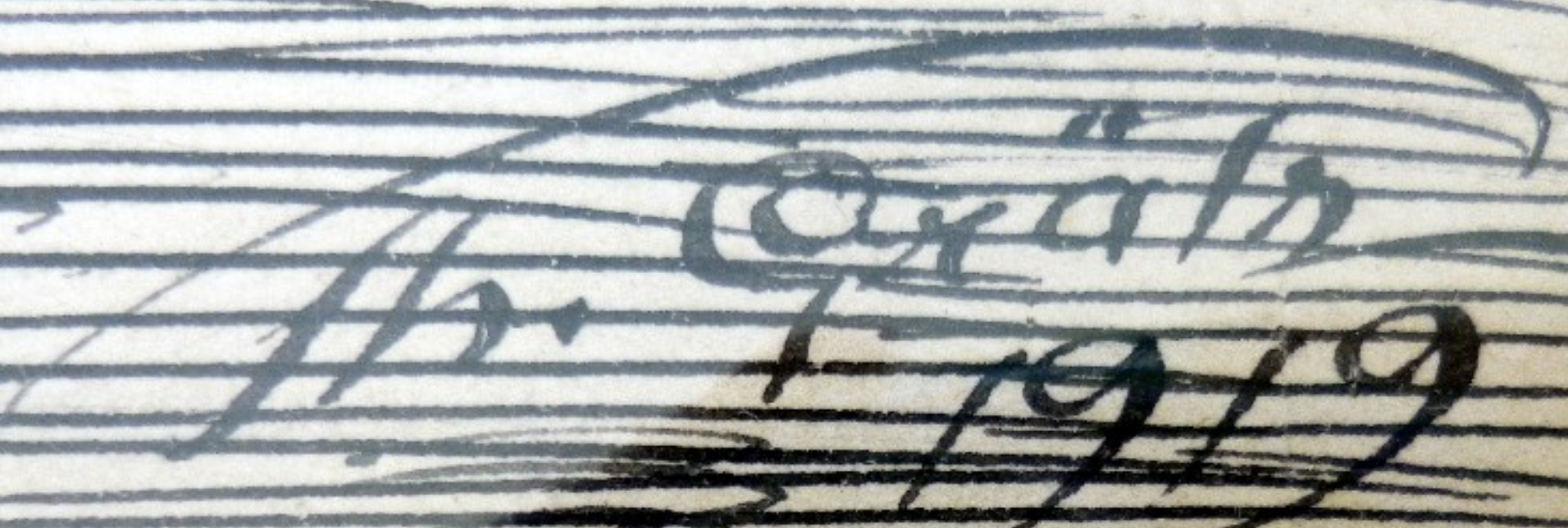
Theodor Grätz (1859–1947), from caricature, 1919

By 1892 Graetz was again working in Vienna, where he drew for several magazines including Figaro, Der Floh ("The Flea") (1891–1913), and the worker's paper Neue Glühlichter ("New Incandescent Light").

== Death ==
Friedrich Graetz's death was reported by December 1912.

== Resources ==
- Search for Graetz, F. (Friedrich), approximately 1840-approximately 1913, Digital Archives, Theodore Roosevelt Center, Dickinson State University
