= Petar Stojanović =

Petar Stojanović may refer to:

- Petar Stojanović (composer) (1877–1957), Hungarian-born Serbian violinist and composer
- Petar Stojanović (footballer) (born 1995), Slovenian football player
