= The Divorcée =

1953 film

- Directed by: George Jacoby
- Written by: Walter Forster; Viktor Léon (libretto); Joachim Wedekind
- Produced by: Fritz Klotsch; Gregor Rabinovitch
- Starring: Marika Rökk; Johannes Heesters; Hans Nielsen
- Cinematography: Konstantin Irmen-Tschet; Herbert Müller; Hans Osterrieder; Gerhard Peters
- Edited by: Walter von Bonhorst
- Music by: Leo Fall (operetta); Friedrich Schröder
- Production company: Cine-Allianz
- Distributed by: Gloria Film; Sascha Film (Austria)
- Release date: 17 September 1953
- Running time: 99 minutes
- Country: West Germany
- Language: German

The Divorcée (German: Die geschiedene Frau) is a 1953 German musical film directed by George Jacoby and starring Marika Rökk, Johannes Heesters and Hans Nielsen. It was based on the operetta Die geschiedene Frau by Leo Fall and Victor Léon. It was shot at the Bavaria Studios in Munich. The film's sets were designed by the art director Robert Herlth.

== Plot ==
Extremely pedantic and sometimes choleric Lukas van Deesteldonck is president of the Dutch sleeping car company. His wife Gonda, a well-known revue star, has a completely different temperament. That is why there is always a crisis in the marriage.

On a train journey from Paris to Amsterdam, Gonda is offered a sleeper coupe by her stage partner Karel van Lyssewege after she couldn't get one herself. When Karel has said goodbye to his partner, the door of the compartment suddenly no longer opens due to a design fault, forcing the two to spend the night in the same compartment. Only when they arrive in Amsterdam can a locksmith fix the problem. Word of what happened spreads quickly and a scandal ensues. Lukas van Deesteldonck believes his wife cheated on him. There is a divorce.

One day Gonda receives a visit from her father, who works as a missionary in Borneo. Knowing that he would be distraught to learn about her divorce, she gets Karel to play the role of her husband. The two get closer. Out of nowhere Gonda's ex also appears, who wants to win her back because he has since convinced himself that he wronged her. But it doesn't take long before he realizes that his ex-wife is lost to him forever.

When the pastor says goodbye to his daughter and her “husband” the next day to return to Borneo, he is very happy that the two young people are a happy married couple.

== Main cast ==
- Marika Rökk as Gonda van der Loo
- Johannes Heesters as Karel
- Hans Nielsen as Lucas
- Hans Leibelt as Pastor
- Friedrich Domin as Gerichtsvorsitzender
- Trude Hesterberg as Schauspielerin
- Gusti Wolf as Adeline
- Peter W. Staub as Scrop
- Erich Fiedler as von der Rosen
- Anni Korin as Dinnie
- Ulrich Bettac as Theaterdirektor
