= The Merry Farmer (1927 film) =

1927 film directed by Franz Seitz

- Directed by: Franz Seitz
- Written by: Viktor Léon (libretto); Charlie Roellinghoff; Klaus Fery
- Produced by: Klaus Fery
- Starring: Carmen Boni; Werner Krauss; S.Z. Sakall
- Cinematography: Eduard Hoesch; Giovanni Vitrotti
- Music by: Leo Fall
- Production company: Fery-Film
- Distributed by: UFA
- Release date: 10 November 1927
- Country: Germany
- Languages: Silent; German intertitles

The Merry Farmer (German: Der fidele Bauer) is a 1927 German silent film directed by Franz Seitz and starring Carmen Boni, Werner Krauss and S.Z. Sakall. It is based on the 1907 operetta of the same title. A 1951 film adaptation was also made.

The film's sets were designed by the art director Willi Herrmann.

== Cast ==
In alphabetical order

- Achmed Beh
- Carmen Boni as Spreewälderin
- Hans Brausewetter
- Ivy Close
- Harry Frank
- Werner Krauss as Bauer Mathäus Reuther
- André Nox as Prof. von Grumow
- Leo Peukert
- S.Z. Sakall as Dorfpolizist
- Simone Vaudry
- Peter Voß
- Mathias Wieman as Sohn Stephan Reuther

== Bibliography ==
- Bock, Hans-Michael & Bergfelder, Tim. The Concise CineGraph. Encyclopedia of German Cinema. Berghahn Books, 2009.
