= Das Mädchen vom Pfarrhof =

1955 film by Alfred Lehner

- Directed by: Alfred Lehner
- Screenplay by: Rudolf Staudinger; Kurt Eigl
- Based on: Der Pfarrer von Kirchfeld by Ludwig Anzengruber.
- Produced by: Erwin C. Dietrich; Hans Engel
- Starring: Waltraut Haas; Erich Auer; Franziska Kinz; Attila Hörbiger; Helene Thimig; Walter Ladengast; Karl Ehmann
- Music by: J. Felsner-Bode
- Release date: 29 September 1955
- Running time: 95 minutes
- Country: Austria
- Language: German

Das Mädchen vom Pfarrhof is a 1955 Austrian Heimatfilm based on a Ludwig Anzengruber's play Der Pfarrer von Kirchfeld and directed by Alfred Lehner.

The film lacks the more controversial themes of the play, such as criticism of celibacy and of the attitude of the Church to suicide and divorce; instead, it takes a more positive outlook, which is characteristic of the Heimatfilme of the period.

A rival West German film version of Anzengruber's play was released two months before Das Mädchen vom Pfarrhof.

== Synopsis ==
Annerl, a beautiful and recently orphaned girl, comes to stay with the young parish priest, Hell, and his housekeeper, Brigitte. Soon, Annerl and the priest find themselves becoming the target of rumors, fuelled by a local named Sepp who is bitter at the Church; this places the priest in a difficult position, and makes Annerl's suitor Michel jealous.

== Cast ==
- Waltraut Haas as Annerl
- Erich Auer as Fr. Hell
- Franziska Kinz as Brigitte
- Attila Hörbiger as Herr von Finsterberg
- Helene Thimig as Gerberleni, Sepp's mother
- Walter Ladengast as Sepp
- Karl Ehmann as the other priest
- Albert Rueprecht as Michel Berndorfer
