= Viktor Léon =

Jewish Austrian-Hungarian librettist

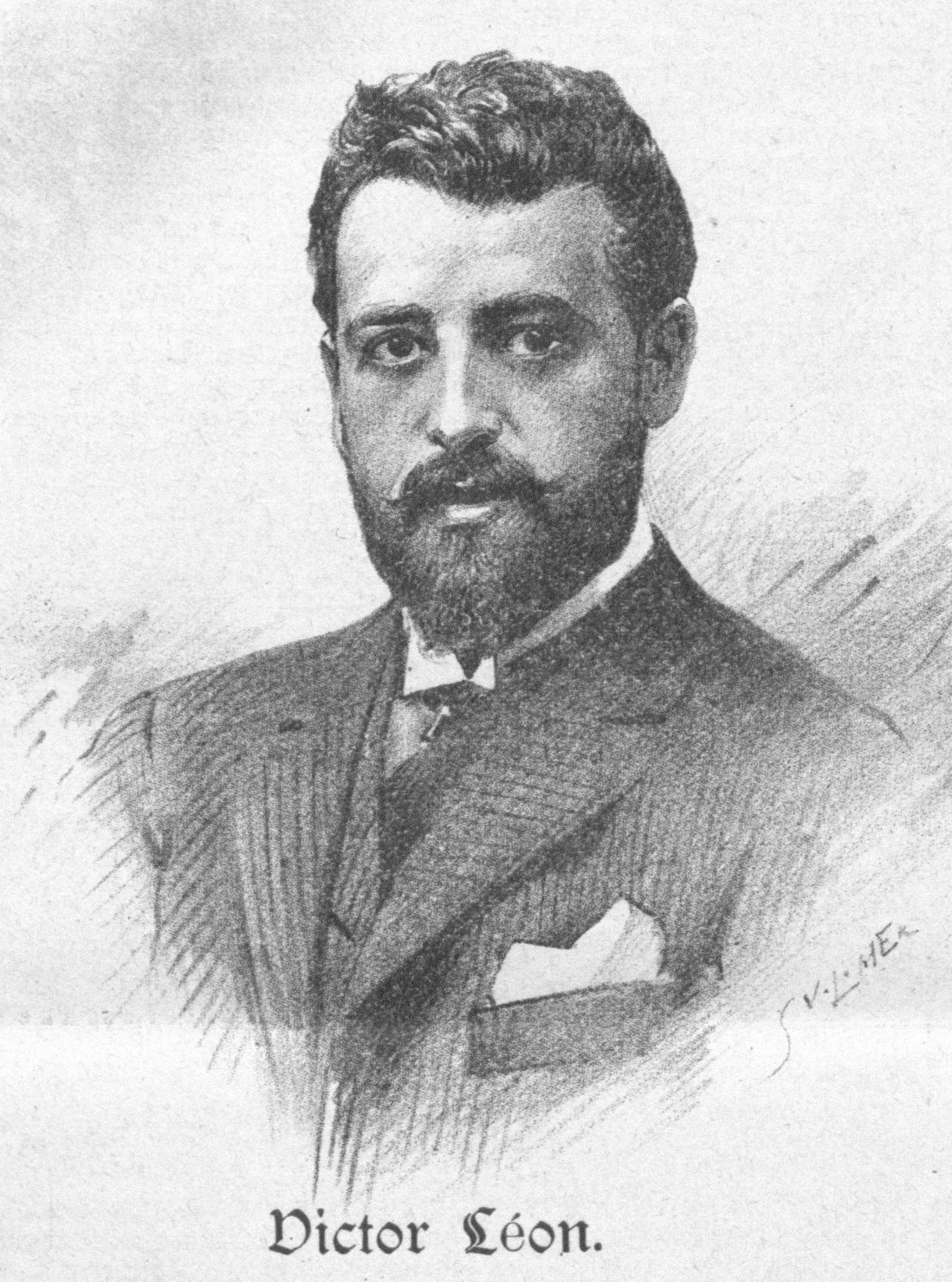
Victor Léon (1894)

Victor Léon, also Viktor Léon (born Victor Hirschfeld; 4 January 1858, Senica, Slovakia – 23 February 1940, Vienna, Austria) was a well-known Jewish librettist. He collaborated with Leo Stein to produce the libretto of Franz Lehár's romantic operetta The Merry Widow (Die lustige Witwe).

== Biography ==
Hirschfeld began a career as a journalist, and then branched out in the theatre under the pseudonym that was to become familiar - Viktor Léon. Between 1880 and 1884 he wrote one-act libretti for Vienna's Ronacher variety theatre, the Carl-Schultze-Theater in Hamburg, and the German Theatre in Pest, collaborating with composers such as Max von Weinzierl, Rudolf Raimann and Alfred Zamara. Then came a three-act collaboration with Zamara, Der Doppelgänger, produced at the Staatstheater am Gärtnerplatz in Munich in September 1886.

He then wrote a libretto for Johann Strauss. Alas, Simplicius, a story of the Thirty Years' War, produced at the Theater an der Wien on 17 December 1887, was scarcely a success, even after being revised twice. There followed a string of further creations with composers such as Zamara, Joseph Hellmesberger, Jr., Alphons Czibulka, Rudolf Dellinger, and even Franz von Suppé (his last work, Das Modell), as well as German adaptations of foreign works that included Arthur Sullivan's The Yeomen of the Guard and Edward Jakobowski's Erminie.

Not until 1898 was Léon associated with a lasting success, when he collaborated with Heinrich von Waldberg and composer Richard Heuberger on Der Opernball (The Opera Ball), produced at the Theater an der Wien that January. Léon's profile was thereby significantly raised, and a string of further works in 1898 and 1899 included another enduring success in Wiener Blut (Vienna Blood), which Adolf Müller Jr. compiled for Vienna's Carltheater from published dance music by the ailing Waltz King, Johann Strauss. This was the first collaboration of the successful partnership of Léon and Leo Stein. Léon also had success with Leo Fall's Die geschiedene Frau which opened at the Carltheater in Vienna on 23 December 1908.

On some of his later works, Victor Léon collaborated with his younger brother Leo, who wrote under the name of Leo Feld. Léon was also director of many of his operettas. In 1910, his daughter Lizzi married the Theater an der Wien's leading man Hubert Marischka. It was Lizzi who suggested the Chinese setting for Die gelbe Jacke, later revised as Das Land des Lächelns. Alas, Lizzi never saw her idea reach the stage, for she died at the age of thirty after giving birth to a son in 1918. Léon dedicated the book of Die gelbe Jacke to her memory. Léon himself long survived not only his daughter, but also his younger brother and his most celebrated literary collaborator, Stein. His last stage credit was for the revision of Lehár's Das Fürstenkind as Der Fürst der Berge in 1932.

Léon remained active well into the 20th century, providing the libretto for Lehár's Das Land des Lächelns (1930), among other works. Although not successful himself, his career brought him in contact with the biggest stars of Viennese opera during his time.

Léon's property was confiscated after Austria's annexation by Nazi Germany in 1938. He died of starvation while in hiding in 1940 at the age of 82.

== Works ==
=== Plays ===
- Fräulein Lehrerin, 1905
- Der große Name, 1909

=== Libretti ===
- Der Doppelgänger, 1886 (Music: Alfred Zamara)
- Simplicius, 1887 (Music: Johann Strauss II)
- Der Streik der Schmiede, 1897 (Music: Max Josef Beer)
- Der Opernball, 1898 (Music: Richard Heuberger)
- Wiener Blut, 1899 (Music: Johann Strauss II)
- Der Rastelbinder, 1902 (Music: Franz Lehár)
- Die Schönen von Fogaras, 1903 (Music: Alfred Grünfeld)
- Barfüßele, 1904, (Music: Richard Heuberger)
- Der Göttergatte, with Leo Stein, 1904 (Music: Franz Lehár)
- Die lustige Witwe, 1905 (Music: Franz Lehár)
- The Merry Farmer (German: Der fidele Bauer), 1907 (Music: Leo Fall)
- Die geschiedene Frau, 1908 (Music: Leo Fall)
- Gold gab ich für Eisen, 1914 (Music: Emmerich Kálmán)
- Wiener Volkssänger, 1919 (Music: Robert Mahler)
- Die gelbe Jacke, 1923 (Music: Franz Lehár), later version The Land of Smiles, 1929

== Filmography ==
- Das erste Weib, directed by Hubert Marischka (Austria, 1915)
- A koldusgróf, directed by Béla Balogh (Hungary, 1917, based on Vergeltsgott)
- Drótostót, directed by Lajos Lázár (Hungary, 1918, based on Der Rastelbinder)
- The Merry Widow, directed by Michael Curtiz (Hungary, 1918)
- Dorela, directed by Ernst Marischka (Austria, 1921)
- The Merry Widow, directed by Erich von Stroheim (1925)
- Love is Blind, directed by Lothar Mendes (Germany, 1925)
- Der Rastelbinder, directed by Heinz Hanus, Arthur Gottlein and Maurice Armand Mondet (Austria, 1926)
- The Divorcée, directed by Victor Janson and Rudolf Dworsky (Germany, 1926)
- Das Fürstenkind, directed by Luise Fleck and Jacob Fleck (Germany, 1927)
- The Merry Farmer, directed by Franz Seitz (Germany, 1927)
- The Land of Smiles, directed by Max Reichmann (Germany, 1930)
- The Merry Widow, directed by Ernst Lubitsch (1934)
- Opernball, directed by Géza von Bolváry (Germany, 1939)
- Vienna Blood, directed by Willi Forst (Germany, 1942)
- The Merry Farmer, directed by Georg Marischka (Austria, 1951)
- The Merry Widow, directed by Curtis Bernhardt (1952)
- The Land of Smiles, directed by Hans Deppe and Erik Ode (West Germany, 1952)
- The Divorcée, directed by Georg Jacoby (West Germany, 1953)
- Opernball, directed by Ernst Marischka (Austria, 1956)
- The Merry Widow, directed by Werner Jacobs (Austria, 1962)
