= The Priest from Kirchfeld (1926 film) =

1926 German film

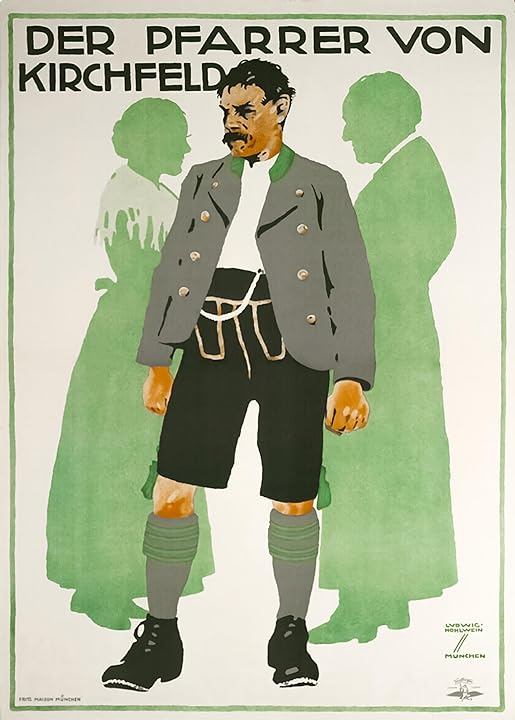
- Directed by: Jacob Fleck; Luise Fleck
- Written by: Ludwig Anzengruber (play); Ida Jenbach
- Produced by: Liddy Hegewald
- Starring: William Dieterle; Fritz Kampers; Dieter Melzer
- Cinematography: Giovanni Vitrotti
- Production company: Hegewald Film
- Release date: 12 November 1926
- Country: Germany
- Languages: Silent; German intertitles

The Priest from Kirchfeld (German: Der Pfarrer von Kirchfeld) is a 1926 German silent film directed by Jacob Fleck and Luise Fleck and starring William Dieterle, Fritz Kampers and Dieter Melzer. It is based on the play Der Pfarrer von Kirchfeld by Ludwig Anzengruber, one of a number of film adaptations of the work.

The film's sets were designed by the art director Hans Rouc.

== Cast ==
- William Dieterle as Pfarrer
- Fritz Kampers
- Dieter Melzer
- Eduard Sekler
- Anton Amon
- Hans Melzer
- Margarete Lanner
- Hedwig Wangel
- Robert Mahr as Dorfschullehrer
- Gustav Adolf Semler
- Max Neufeld

== Bibliography ==
- Goble, Alan. The Complete Index to Literary Sources in Film. Walter de Gruyter, 1999.
