= The Priest from Kirchfeld (1937 film) =

1937 film

- Directed by: Jacob Fleck; Luise Fleck
- Written by: Ludwig Anzengruber (play); Hubert Frohn
- Produced by: Leo Berg
- Starring: Hans Jaray; Hansi Stork; Ludwig Stössel
- Cinematography: Ernst Mühlrad
- Music by: Viktor Altmann; Karl M. May
- Production company: Excelsior Film
- Distributed by: Karl Philipp Verleih
- Release date: 18 November 1937
- Running time: 81 minutes
- Country: Austria
- Language: German

The Priest from Kirchfeld (German: Der Pfarrer von Kirchfeld) is a 1937 Austrian film directed by Jacob Fleck and Luise Fleck and starring Hans Jaray, Hansi Stork and Ludwig Stössel. It is based on the play Der Pfarrer von Kirchfeld by Ludwig Anzengruber.

== Cast ==
- Hans Jaray as Peter Hell - der Pfarrer von Kirchfeld
- Hansi Stork as Annerl Birkmeyer
- Ludwig Stössel as Vetter, der Pfarrer von Skt. Jakob
- Karl Paryla as Der Wurzelsepp
- Frida Richard as Josepha, Wurzelsepps Mutter
- Fred Hülgerth as Michel Berndorfer
- Rudolf Steinboeck as Loisl
- Fritz Diestl as Wirt
- Hanns Kurth as Graf Paul von Finsterberg
- Poldi Czernitz-Renn as Brigitte, Hells Wirtschafterin
- Wiener Sängerknaben as Knabenchor
- Rita Wottowa as Sängerin

== Bibliography ==
- Goble, Alan. The Complete Index to Literary Sources in Film. Walter de Gruyter, 1999.
