= Martha Wallner =

Austrian actress (1927–2018)

- Born: 28 March 1927; Vienna, Austria
- Died: 21 March 2018 (aged 90)
- Occupation: Actress
- Years active: 1948–1979
- Spouse: Erich Auer

Martha Wallner (28 March 1927 – 21 March 2018) was an Austrian stage and film actress. She also appeared in films and television. She was awarded the title Kammerschauspielerin (an Austrian title of honor). Married to the actor Erich Auer, she died at age 90.

== Filmography ==
Year	Title	Role	Notes
1949	Liebesprobe	Gretl	
1955	The Last Ten Days	Frieda, canteen server	
1957	Salzburg Stories	Buhlschaft (lover)	Uncredited
1958	The Street	Andrea	
1968	The Castle	Amalia	
1979	Tales from the Vienna Woods	Alfred's Mother	(final film role)
