= Die geschiedene Frau =

Operetta by Leo Fall and Victor Léon

- Operetta by Leo Fall
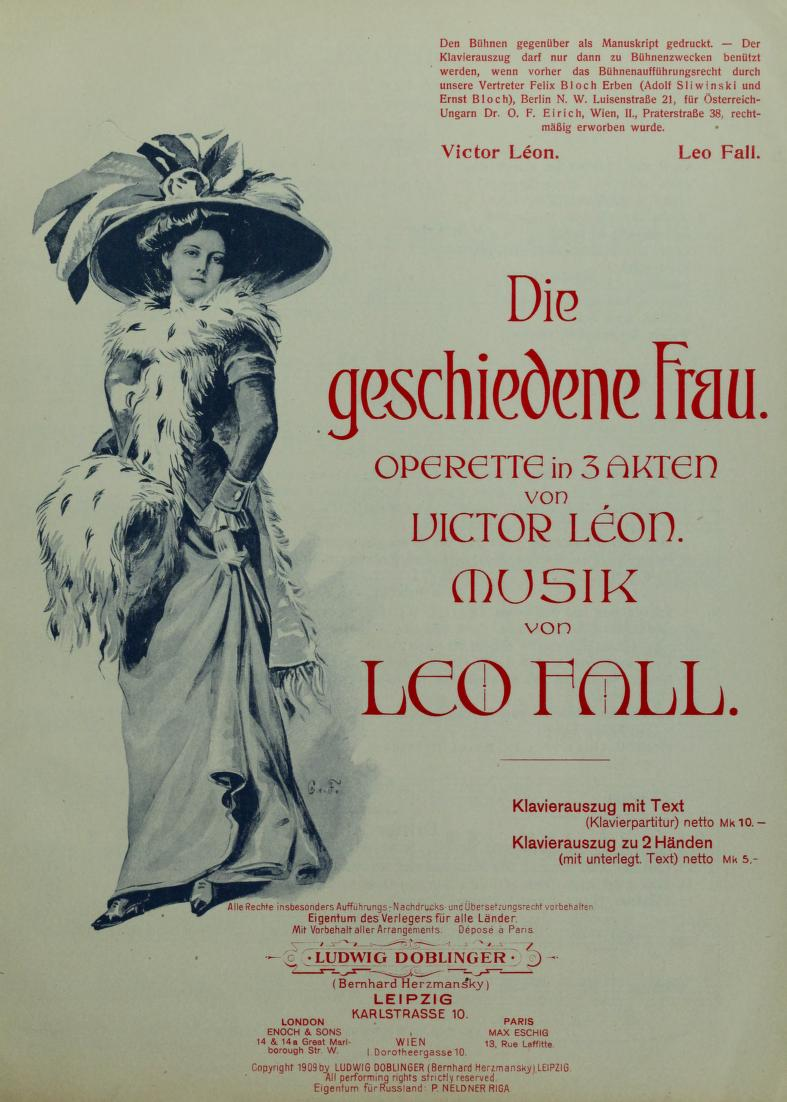
- Cover of the vocal score
- Librettist: Victor Léon
- Premiere: 23 December 1908; Carltheater, Vienna

Die geschiedene Frau (The Divorcée), is an operetta in three acts by Leo Fall with a libretto by Victor Léon based on Victorien Sardou's Divorçons!. Conducted by the composer, It opened to considerable success at the Carltheater in Vienna on 23 December 1908 with Hubert Marischka as Karel.

It was translated into Italian and premiered at the Teatro Lirico Internationale in Milan as La divorziata on 16 August 1909, then translated into English and performed at the Vaudeville Theatre in London as The Girl in the Train from 4 June 1910. Performances followed in Rome on 19 January 1911, in Paris as La divorcée at the Théâtre Apollo on 18 February, and in Madrid as La mujer divorciada at the Teatro Eslava on 23 December the same year, conducted by the composer.

== Roles ==
Roles, voice types, premiere cast
| Role | Voice type | Premiere cast, 23 December 1908 Conductor: Leo Fall |
|---|---|---|
| Jana | soprano | Mizzi Zwerenz |
| Gonda van der Loo | soprano | Annie Dirkens |
| Martje | soprano | Mizzi Jesel |
| Lucas van Deesteldonck | tenor | Richard Waldemar |
| Karel van Lysseveghe | tenor | Hubert Marischka |
| Scroop | tenor | Josef König |
| Willem | baritone | Max Rohr |
| Pieter te Bakkenskijl | baritone | Carl Blasel |

== English adaptations ==
The 1910 English adaptation, The Girl in the Train, was produced in two acts by George Edwardes at the Vaudeville Theatre in London, with lyrics by Adrian Ross, and ran for 340 performances. The London production starred Robert Evett, Phyllis Dare, Huntley Wright and Rutland Barrington. Arthur Williams and Connie Ediss later joined the cast. After closing in London this production, by then starring Daisy Burrell, went on tour until 1911. In October 1911 the Gloucestershire Echo reported that "Mr. Nicholas Hannen as President Van Eyck was 'great'. Miss Daisy Burrell acts and sings delightfully as Gonda Van der Loo and Miss Millicent Field is equally good as the jealous wife Karel Van Raalte".

The American production opened at the Globe Theatre in New York City (now the Lunt-Fontanne Theatre) on 3 October 1910 with a new adaptation by Harry B. Smith, which subsequently toured in Britain, America and Australia, among others.

In the English version, Gonda Van Der Loo, a young actress travelling on a train in Holland at night, is unable to secure a berth. Karel Van Raalte, a young married gentleman, generously offers her his compartment, but by an accident the two become locked in the compartment together. Their cries and knocks are unheard, and they are forced to spend the night together. Raalte's wife learns of the incident and jealously brings divorce proceedings. However, after many complications and much time spent in the divorce court, Raalte and his wife are reunited, while the Judge finds romance with the actress.

== Musical numbers (Adrian Ross version) ==
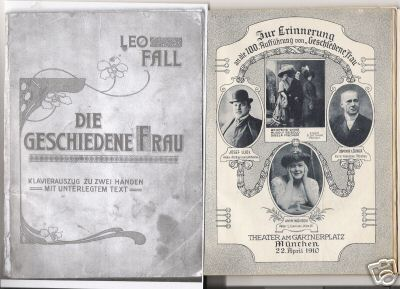
Programme for a performance in Munich on 22 April 1910

Act 1 – Court of Justice, Amsterdam

- No. 1 – Jana – "Only one word I add, that I have loved him well"
- No. 2 – Karel, President and Chorus – "Confound it all, confound it all"
- No. 2a – Chorus – "Confound it all, confound it all"
- No. 2b – Chorus – "Oh Jiminy, Oh Jiminy, Oh Jim, Oh Jiminy!"
- No. 3 – Jana, Martje, Karel, Willem and President – "You see we got married the very same day"
- No. 3a – Entrance of Gonda
- No. 4 – Gonda – "We poor little girls with a part to play must often be travelling night and day"
- No. 4a – Chorus – "Oh Jiminy, Oh Jiminy, Oh Jim, Oh Jiminy!"
- Nos. 5 & 6 – Scena and Finale: Karel, Jana, Gonda, President, etc. – "Now, Jana, say, why should you be so jealous?"

Act 2 – Drawing room, Karel Van Raalte's house

- No. 7 – Introductory Dance
- No. 8 – Gonda and Karel – "I'm no lover, as you'll discover by hearing me propose"
- No. 9 – Karel – "Pictured face, that smile in your place, with joy of a day that's gone"
- No. 10 – Jana – "I wonder whether you can tell me a secret that I long to know!"
- No. 11 – Karel, Jana and Van Tromp – "Children, I feel there's a sort of a change! Say, is there anything wrong?"
- No. 11a – President and Van Tromp – "Oh, Memory! Oh! the merry days when we were boys"
- No. 12 – Gonda, De Leije, Van Dender, President and Van Tromp – "So to put an end to doubt"
- No. 13 – Gonda and President – "So you catch her! ... Catch her? ... Catch her! ... If you can"
- No. 14 – Jama & Karel – "You give your word?... I give my word! I'll keep your promise, tho' it seems absurd"
- No. 15 – Finale: Jana, Gonda, Van Tromp and President – "Gonda, charming little Gonda! You're as good as you are clever"

== Film versions ==
The 1926 silent film The Divorcée by Victor Janson and Rudolf Dworsky is based on this operetta. A musical version was made in 1953 under the original title Die geschiedene Frau, but it was released in Britain, France and the United States as The Divorcée. it was directed by Georg Jacoby, and starred Marika Rökk and Johannes Heesters.
