= Donauweibchen =

Donauweibchen (Danube Mermaid), Op. 427, is a waltz composed by Johann Strauss II in December 1887. The composition features melodies from Strauss' operetta Simplicius. It was first performed in January 1888 at one of Eduard Strauss's Sunday concerts in the Musikverein.
