= Petar Stojanović (composer) =

Serbian violinist and composer

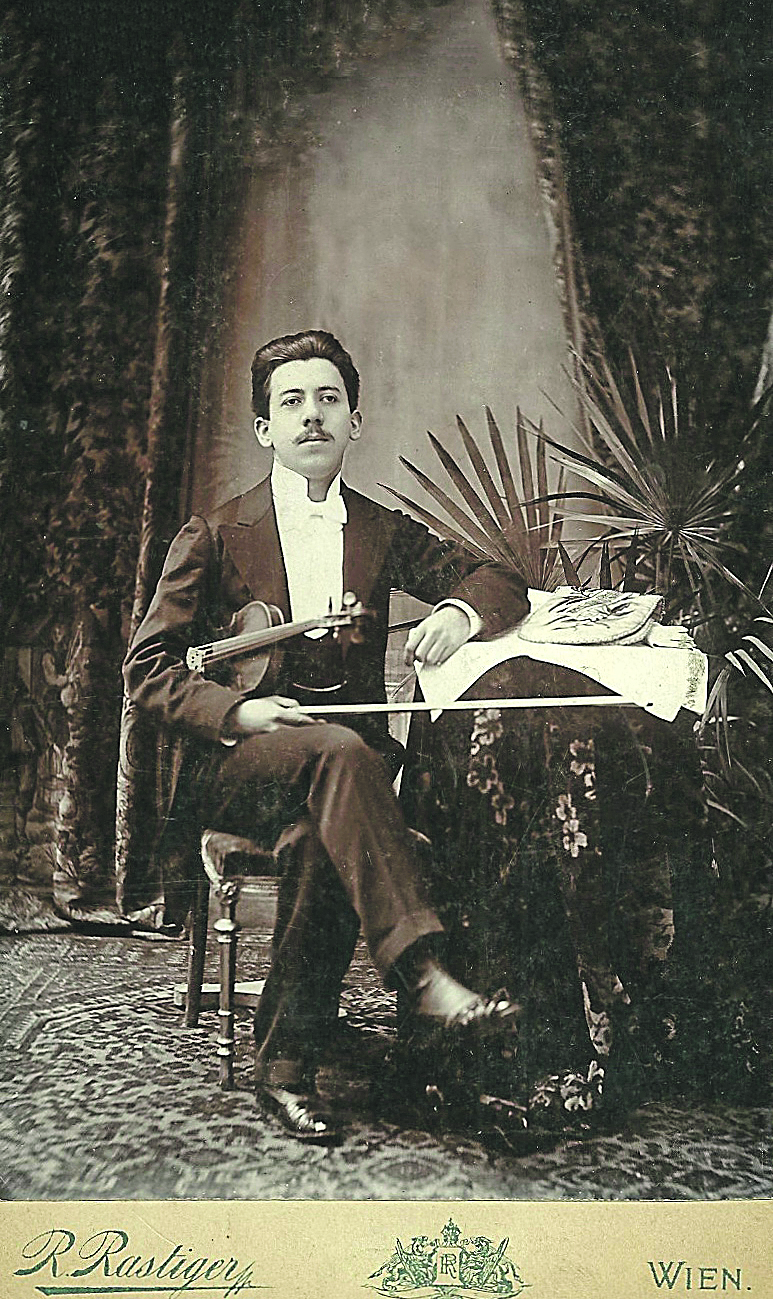
- Portrait of Petar Stojanović
- Born: 7 September 1877; Budapest, Austria-Hungary
- Died: 11 September 1957 (aged 80); Belgrade, Yugoslavia
- Occupation: Composer

Petar Stojanović (7 September 1877 – 11 September 1957) was a Serbian violinist and composer of operettas, ballets and orchestral music. (His birthday is also variously given as 6 September and 25 August.)

== Life ==
He was born in Budapest and studied the violin there with Jenő Hubay. At the Vienna Conservatory, he studied violin with Jakob Grün and composition with Robert Fuchs and Richard Heuberger. In 1925, he became professor of violin in Belgrade, where he lived until his death. A music college in the town of Ub is named after him.

== Selected works ==
Stage

- Tigar (The Tiger; Der Tiger), comic opera; libretto by R. von Perger, Budapest, 14 November 1905
- Devojka na Mansardi (The Girl from the Garrett; Liebchen am Dach); libretto by Viktor Léon, 1917
- Vojvoda od Rajhštata (The Duke of Reichstadt; Die Herzog von Reichstadt); libretto by Viktor Léon and Heinz Reichert, Vienna, 1921
- Mirjana, ballet (1942)
- Devet čiraka (Nine Candlesticks), ballet (1944)

Orchestral

- Smrt junaka (The Hero's Death), symphonic poem (1918)
- Sava, symphonic poem (1935)

Concertante

- Violin Concerto No. 1 in D minor, op. 1 (1904)
- Violin Concerto No. 2 (Prague, 1916)
- Violin Concerto No. 3
- Violin Concerto No. 4
- Violin Concerto No. 5 in D major, op. 78 (1944)
- Double Concerto for Violin, Piano and orchestra in A major, op. 110 (1950)

Chamber music

- Piano Quintet in C minor, Op. 9 (published 1909)
- Piano Quartet in D major, Op. 15 (published 1913)
- Piano Trio, Op. 16 (published 1913)
- Jugoslovenski rondo i Humoreska (Yugoslavian Rondo and Humoresque) for violin and piano (published 1955)
- Sonata in C major for viola and piano, Op. 97
