= Simplicius (operetta) =

1887 operetta by Johann Strauss II

Due to overcrowding of the warehouse, Johann Strauss is holding a large sheet music sale. (1887 caricature after the operetta premiere, Der Floh)

Simplicius is an operetta by Johann Strauss II. It was conceived from the work of HJC von Grimmelhausen titled Der abenteuerliche Simplicissimus or simply Adventurous Simplicissimus, which was opined by many to be the 17th century's greatest German novel. The libretto for this work was furnished by Victor Léon who was one of Vienna's promising talents of that era.

== Performance history ==
The operetta received its premiere at the Theater an der Wien on 17 December 1887 and was nearly marred by a false fire alert in the theatre. The audience of the first night clearly remembered the theatre tragedy of the Ringtheater inferno in Vienna six years earlier and the false alarm nearly triggered a stampede. Strauss' good friend Viktor Tilgner later recounted that the composer's quick thinking avoided a tragedy as he directed one of the actors to sing a popular number "Ich denke gern zurück an mein entschwundnes Glück" waltz romance song from the final act again to divert the audience's attention. This waltz song was to later become the first waltz theme of his popular "Donauweibchen", Op. 427 ("Danube Maiden").

This operetta is largely forgotten today, although its music is still performed at length. Its music was also probably survived by the many individual pieces that Johann Strauss II produced from the original score among them Donauweibchen mentioned above as well as "Reitermarsch", Op. 428, and the polka-mazurka "Lagerlust", Op. 431.

== Roles ==
Roles, voice types, premiere cast
Role	Voice type	Premiere cast, 17 December 1887 Conductor: Johann Strauss II
The Hermit/Wendelin von Grübben	tenor	Josef Josephi
Simplicius, his younger son	soprano en travesti	Ottilie Collin
General von Vliessen	baritone	Hans Pokorny
Hildegarde, his daughter	soprano	Therese Biedermann
Arnim von Grübben, brother of Simplicius	tenor	Alexander Girardi
Melchior, an astrologer	baritone	Sebastian Stelzer
Ebba, a Swedish spy	mezzo-soprano	
Schnapslotte, owner of the travelling canteen	mezzo-soprano	Antonie Harmann-Löwy
Tilly, her daughter	mezzo-soprano	Antonie Harmann-Löwy
Haidvogel	tenor	Karl Streitmann
Sergeant-major	baritone	
Officers, Soldiers

== Synopsis ==
Time: In the final years of the Thirty Years' War (1618–1648).

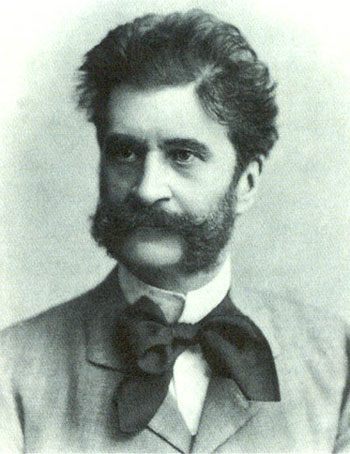
Johann Strauss II

Overview: When Wendelin von Grübben tells his younger brother Bruno that they both love the same woman, Bruno abandons the Catholic faith, joins the heretics and is killed in battle by Wendelin. Full of remorse, Wendelin sends his own son (Arnim) and wife (Countess von Vliessen) to a religious house, despite her having just borne Simplicius, their second son. Wendelin decides not to kill himself and Simplicius but to retreat into the forest with his son, vowing to protect him from worldly influences. The Countess dies. Her will declares that the Grübben family fortune can only be inherited with the betrothal of a Grübben and another Countess von Vliessen. Otherwise the entire estate goes to the Church. Arnim leaves the religious house, and with Wendelin and Simplicius missing, it is eventually assumed that the family has died out, though there is no firm proof.

=== Act 1 ===
In a dense wood in the foothills of the Sudeten Mountains

The Hermit, Wendelin von Grübben, seeks peace of mind through prayer. The sound of trumpets can be heard as war rages in the distance. Wendelin's meditation is interrupted by the appearance of Melchior, an astrologer, and his Swedish female attendant, Ebba. Melchior declares that astrology never lets him down, and surprises Wendelin by claiming to be a descendant of the Grübben family and consequently entitled to marry one Hildegarde von Vliessen, thereby saving the Grübben fortune. He cannot prove that there are no remaining male descendants of the Grübben family, but he claims that astrologically speaking there is no evidence of any living descendants. In order to be left in peace, Wendelin hands over to Melchior the farewell letter that he wrote when initially planning to kill himself and Simplicius.

Their exchanges are interrupted by an agitated Simplicius who has seen iron men in the woods and who believes them to be devils. Several soldiers who have lost their way then arrive and assuming the wild and unkempt Simplicius to be a kidnap victim, they separate him from his father and order him to leave the woods. Wendelin remains behind, confused and broken.

=== Act 2 ===
In a camp at Olmütz (Olomouc)

While handing out double rations with her daughter Tilly to the troops before battle, Schnapslotte is drawn to an unknown soldier. For the past twenty years, she has suspected in every stranger like Melchior, her long lost husband. Once again she is mistaken.

Meanwhile, Simplicius has been taken up by General von Vliessen's entourage. Seemingly incapable of comprehending the finer arts of war, he is constantly rebuked by the Sergeant-major. Tilly takes him under her wing, determined to make a real soldier out of him. With the expected arrival of a Baron von Grübben now imminent, General von Vliessen has summoned his daughter Hildegarde from the convent in Prague where she has spent most of her life. Hildegarde unsuccessfully pleads with her father not to be made to marry a stranger.

Arnim, now a student in Prague and in love with Hildegarde, has followed her to the camp where Simplicius takes him to be an enemy. In order to win Hildegarde over Arnim drops his studies and serves under the General. Hildegarde describes a dream in which two men vie for her heart and is rebuked by her father and offered bitter consolation from Schnapslotte.

Hildegarde tells Arnim that she has been promised to another, yet loses her heart to Arnim. The General is indignant when his daughter turns up on the arm of a stranger who has the audacity to ask for her hand in marriage. Arnim proudly points out his family heritage, calling himself the Baron von Grübben. Pleased at this unexpected turn of events, General von Vliessen announces their immediate engagement.

During the festivities, Simplicius arrives with a bound captive, Melchior, whom he had discovered in the camp and arrested as an enemy. Before Melchior can be hanged he announces that he too is the Baron von Grübben, and as proof presents Wendelin's letter. The confusion is deepened when an imperial dispatch arrives from Vienna claiming that suspect papers and documents have been discovered in the residence of one Baron von Grübben. These papers are linked to Sweden, and orders are given to place the Baron under arrest until further notice. Melchior, who we know is in fact involved with the Swede Ebba, denies the allegations. Both Arnim and Melchior are placed under arrest, and Simplicius is made an ensign. The troops set out to fight the Swedes.

=== Act 3 ===
Six months later in a castle courtyard in Hanau

As Wendelin despairs of ever being reunited with his son a group of angry peasants hunt down Simplicius for ever acting the fool. Simplicius finds himself facing arrest under the orders of the Sergeant-major. Arnim and Melchior, still imprisoned, reach an understanding. Melchior agrees to give up his claim to Hildegarde on condition that the family fortune tied up in the marriage deal be handed over to him. Arnim agrees. Before being able to tell Hildegarde the good news, General von Vliessen receives a new order from Vienna: a wild young man named Simplicius must be found. Whoever should find him is honour-bound to treat him with respect as he is none other than the son of Baron von Grübben. The General immediately promotes Simplicius to the rank of lieutenant and orders him to marry Hildegarde. Arnim is overjoyed at meeting his long-lost brother again. Simplicius agrees to be married but is confused, especially as Tilly now demands to know his feelings towards her. Schnapslotte offers Tilly more homely advice as Simplicius and Tilly talk of love.

Melchior finds himself a victim of his own cunning: he had secretly given Tilly's mother a love potion to be administered to Hildegarde but Schnapslotte drank it herself. Tilly's mother enters Melchior's cell and again attempts to seduce him, claiming him to be her long lost husband. Melchior gives in, and admits that his own horoscope had indeed predicted something along these lines.

The General returns triumphant from battle against the Swedes and brings Ebba with him as his prisoner. She has been identified as the source of the suspect Swedish correspondence found in the Baron's residence, and is presented with both Arnim and Melchior. She identifies Melchior as the addressee of the letters, and Arnim is freed.

Simplicius brings in the other Swedish prisoners, who, at the command of the General, are to boost camp morale by singing. But the prisoners' destiny reminds all of their own sacrifices and losses during this war. Simplicius retreats into the forest. Others follow him. They meet with a peasant (Wendelin) who had all but given up hope of ever being reunited with his son. The fact that Wendelin is still alive negates the will made so many years before by his wife, the Countess von Vliessen. Finally, Tilly and Simplicius as well as Hildegarde and Arnim find their happiness in each other.

== Recordings ==
- EMI Classics (2000): Conductor Franz Welser-Möst and the Zürich Opera Orchestra and Chorus. Michael Volle, Elizabeth Magnuson, Martin Zysset, Oliver Widmer, Cheyne Davidson, Piotr Beczała, Liliana Nikiteanu, Martina Janková, and Louise Martini.
