= Homecoming to Happiness =

1933 film directed by Carl Boese

- Directed by: Carl Boese
- Written by: Ludwig von Wohl; Count d'Haussonville; Joseph Than
- Produced by: Kurt Peters; Joseph Than; Walter von Ercert
- Starring: Luise Ullrich; Paul Hörbiger; Heinz Rühmann; Ludwig Stössel
- Cinematography: Bruno Mondi
- Edited by: Putty Krafft
- Music by: Eduard Künneke
- Production company: A.B.C.-Film
- Distributed by: Metropol Film
- Release date: 18 August 1933
- Running time: 86 minutes
- Country: Germany
- Language: German

Homecoming to Happiness (German: Heimkehr ins Glück) is a 1933 German comedy film directed by Carl Boese and starring Luise Ullrich, Paul Hörbiger and Heinz Rühmann. It was shot at the EFA Studios in Berlin's Halensee area. The film's sets were designed by the art director Franz Schroedter. Alessandro Blasetti directed the Italian remake L'impiegata di papà in 1934.

== Synopsis ==
While motoring in the countryside, a wealthy shoe tycoon suffers a case of mistaken identity that leads to an unemployed actor being taken for him. The tycoon meanwhile meets and falls in love with a beautiful young woman.

== Cast ==
- Luise Ullrich as Liesl Pichler
- Paul Hörbiger as Karl Gruber
- Heinz Rühmann as Amadori
- Ludwig Stössel as Pichler
- Erika Falgar as Liane Gruber
- Paul Heidemann as Schloßverwalter
- Harry Gondi as Rudi Schröder
- Hans Hemes as Erster Jäger
- Hans Albin as Zweiter Jäger
- Lis de Boy as Eine Freundin Lianes
- Richard Klick as Pichlers Lehrling
- Ossy Kratz-Corell as Betrunkener Jodler
- Wolfgang Staudte as Phillip, Grubers Sekretär

== Bibliography ==
- Hake, Sabine (2001). Popular Cinema of the Third Reich. University of Texas Press. ISBN 978-0-292-73458-6.
- Klaus, Ulrich J. Deutsche Tonfilme: Jahrgang 1933. Klaus-Archiv, 1988.
