= Ottilie Collin =

Austrian soprano

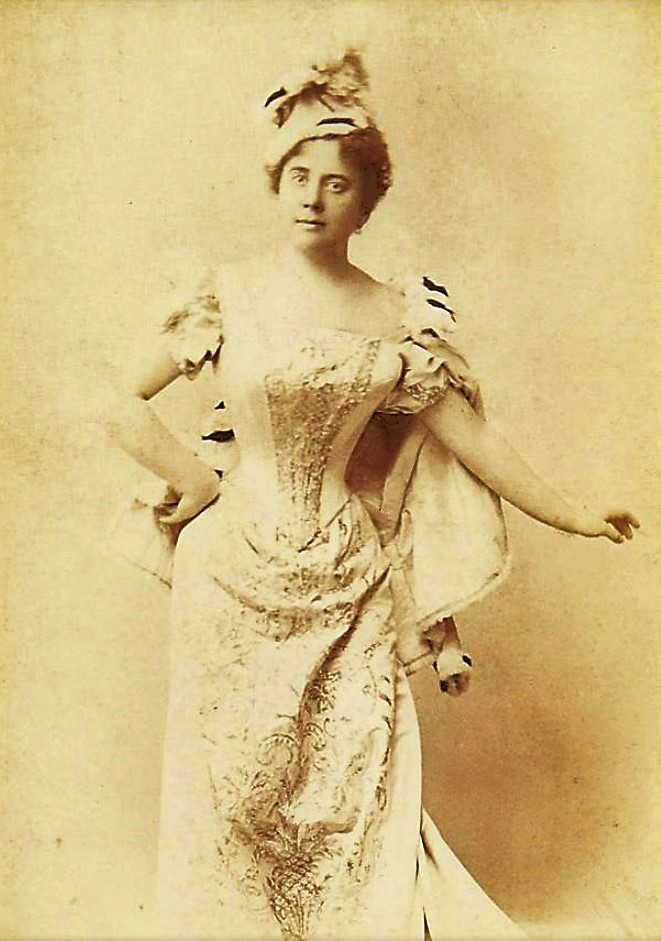
Ottilie Collin

Ottilie Müller, known by the stage name Ottilie Collin, (19 May 1863 – 29 February 1960) was an Austrian soprano remembered for her performances in late 19th century Viennese operettas.

== Biography ==
Ottilie Müller was born in Vienna on 19 May 1863. She was trained as a musician in Graz by Mořic Stanislav Anger. As first appearing on the stage in Graz, she appeared at the Theater von Teplitz in the title role of Franz von Suppé's Die schöne Galathée in 1881. She was just eighteen years old at this time. She adopted the stage name Ottilie Collin.

On 3 October 1883 Collin portrayed the fisher-girl Annina in the premiere of Johann Strauss II's Eine Nacht in Venedig at the Neues Friedrich-Wilhelmstädtisches Theater in Berlin. She sang for two seasons at that theater as a leading operetta soprano before going to Vienna where she was an operetta prima donna at the Theater an der Wien (TW) from 1884 to 1891.

Collin sang in several world premieres at the TW; including creating the roles of Minna in Carl Millöcker's The Black Hussar (1884), Rita in Alphons Czibulka's Pfingsten in Florenz (1884), the gyspy girl Saffi in Strauss II's The Gypsy Baron (1885), the title role in Strauss II's Simplicius (1887), and the Electress in Carl Zeller's Der Vogelhändler (1891). She also appeared at the Carltheater in Vienna as Christl in the world premiere of Johann Brandl's Der liebe Augustin (1887), and performed in the premiere of Charles Weinberger's Pagenstreiche (1888).

From 1891 to 1896 Collin was once again committed to the Friedrich Wilhelmstädtisches Theater in Berlin. In 1898 she appeared at the Theater unter der Linden in Berlin in the trouser role of Henri in Der Opernball. She ended her career at the Staatstheater am Gärtnerplatz where she was a leading soprano in 1899-1900.

In 1899 Collin married the equestrian owner Max Heilmeyr. She died in Vienna on 29 February 1960 at the age of 96.
