= Erich Auer =

Austrian actor (1923–2004)

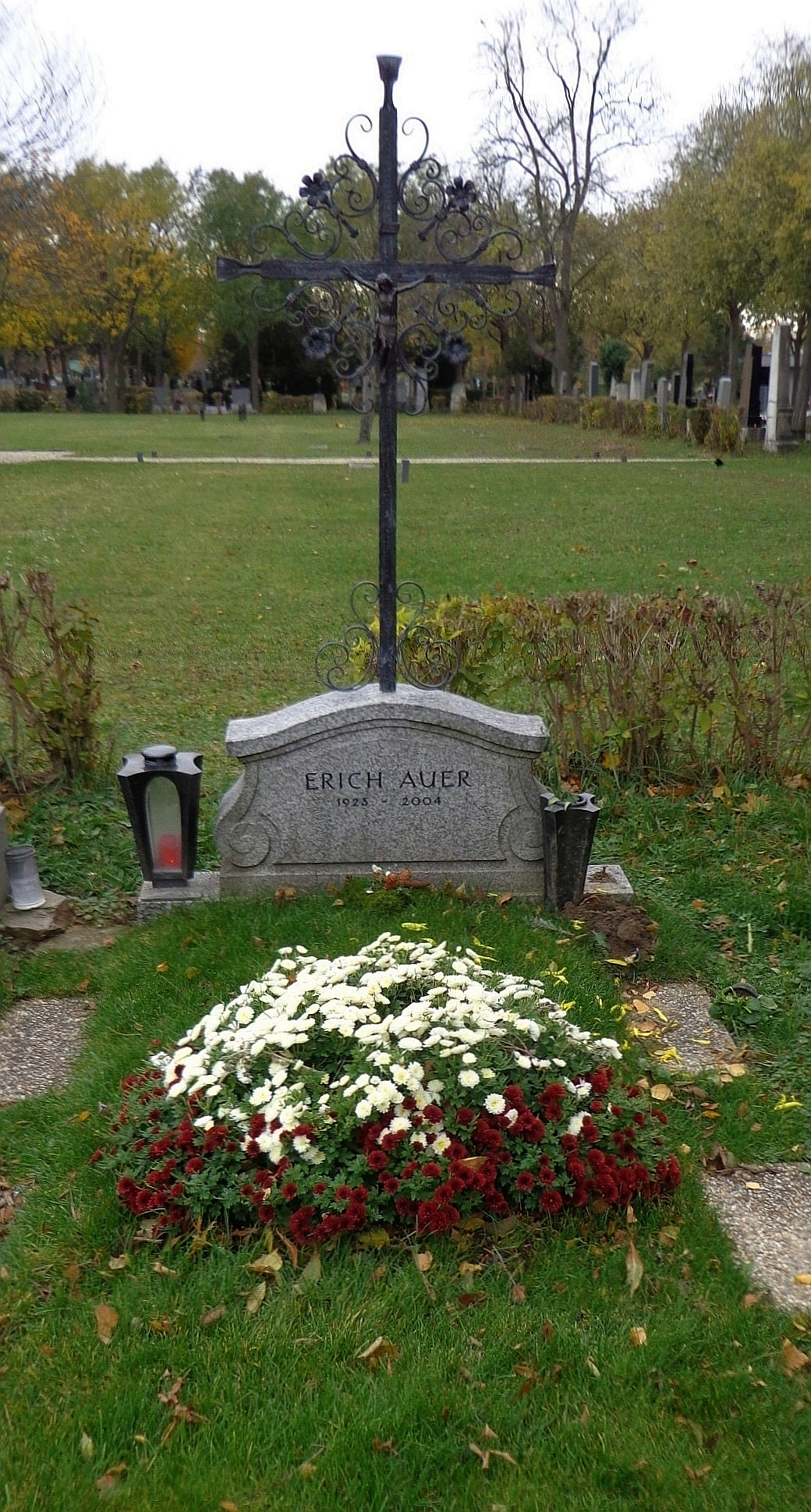
- Erich Auer's grave
- Born: 14 April 1923; Vienna, Austria
- Died: 17 December 2004 (aged 81); Vienna, Austria
- Occupation: Actor
- Years active: 1949–1997 (film and TV)

Erich Auer (14 April 1923 – 17 December 2004) was an Austrian theater, film and television actor. He had leading roles in several heimatfilmen during the early 1950s. He was married to Martha Wallner, a popular Austrian actress. They had two children, Marieluise and Erich Auer.

== Selected filmography ==
- Duel with Death (1949)
- The Fourth Commandment (1950)
- The Merry Farmer (1951)
- Spring on Ice (1951)
- The Crucifix Carver of Ammergau (1952)
- The Monastery's Hunter (1953)
- Marriage Strike (1953)
- Ten on Every Finger (1954)
- The First Kiss (1954)
- Das Mädchen vom Pfarrhof (1955)
- The King of Bernina (1957)

== Bibliography ==
- Goble, Alan. The Complete Index to Literary Sources in Film. Walter de Gruyter, 1999.
