= The Merry Farmer (operetta) =

1907 German-language operetta by Leo Fall

- Operetta by Leo Fall
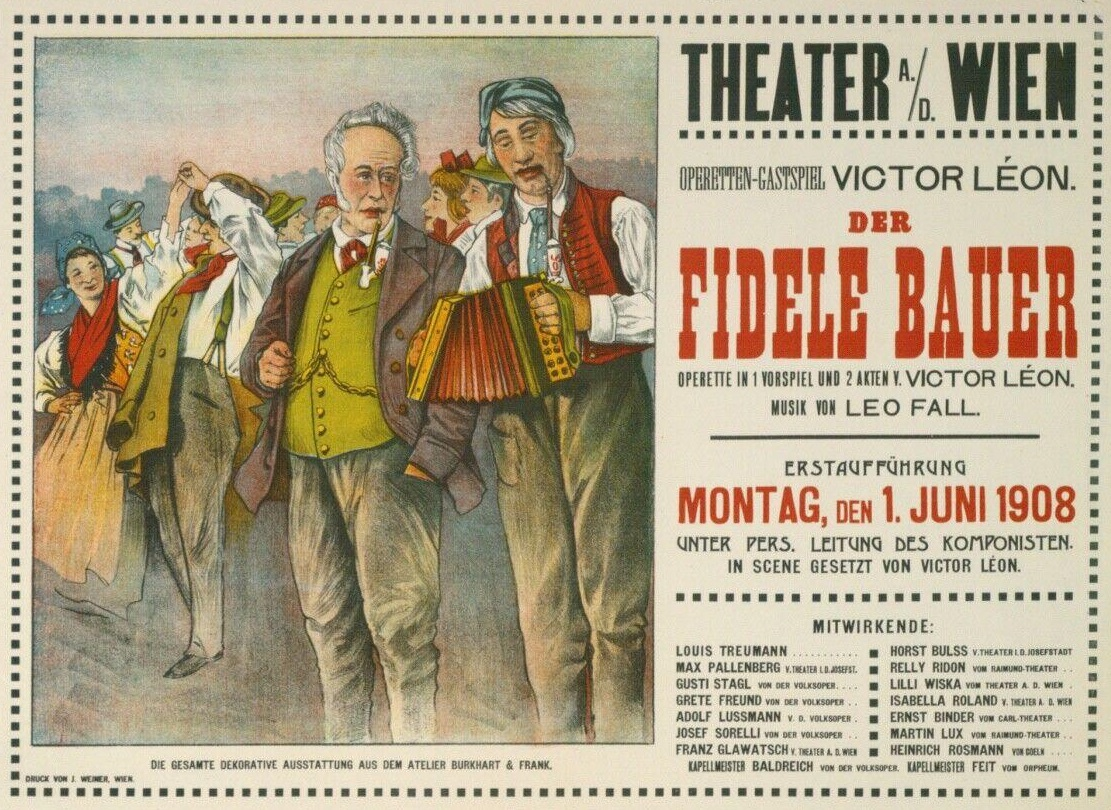
- Poster for the 1908 performance in Vienna
- Native title: Der fidele Bauer
- Librettist: Viktor Léon
- Premiere: 27 July 1907; Hoftheater, Mannheim

The Merry Farmer (German: Der fidele Bauer) is a German-language operetta composed by Leo Fall with a libretto by Viktor Léon. It premiered at the Mannheim Hoftheater on 27 July 1907 and was Fall's first major hit. It transferred to the Theater an der Wien in June 1908, and to the Theater des Westens, Berlin, in October 1908.

As The Merry Peasant, the operetta was produced in London in 1909, opening at the Strand Theatre on 23 October for 69 performances, with Courtice Pounds (as Mathaeus [sic]) & Sybil Arundale (as Annamirl). The English book and lyrics were by Cosmo Hamilton, with additional songs by Theodore Holland.

== Film adaptations ==
In 1927 a German silent film The Merry Farmer was based on the libretto with extracts of the music played in cinemas by accompanists. In 1951 it was remade as an Austrian sound film The Merry Farmer.
