= Ludwig Stössel =

Austrian actor (1883–1973)

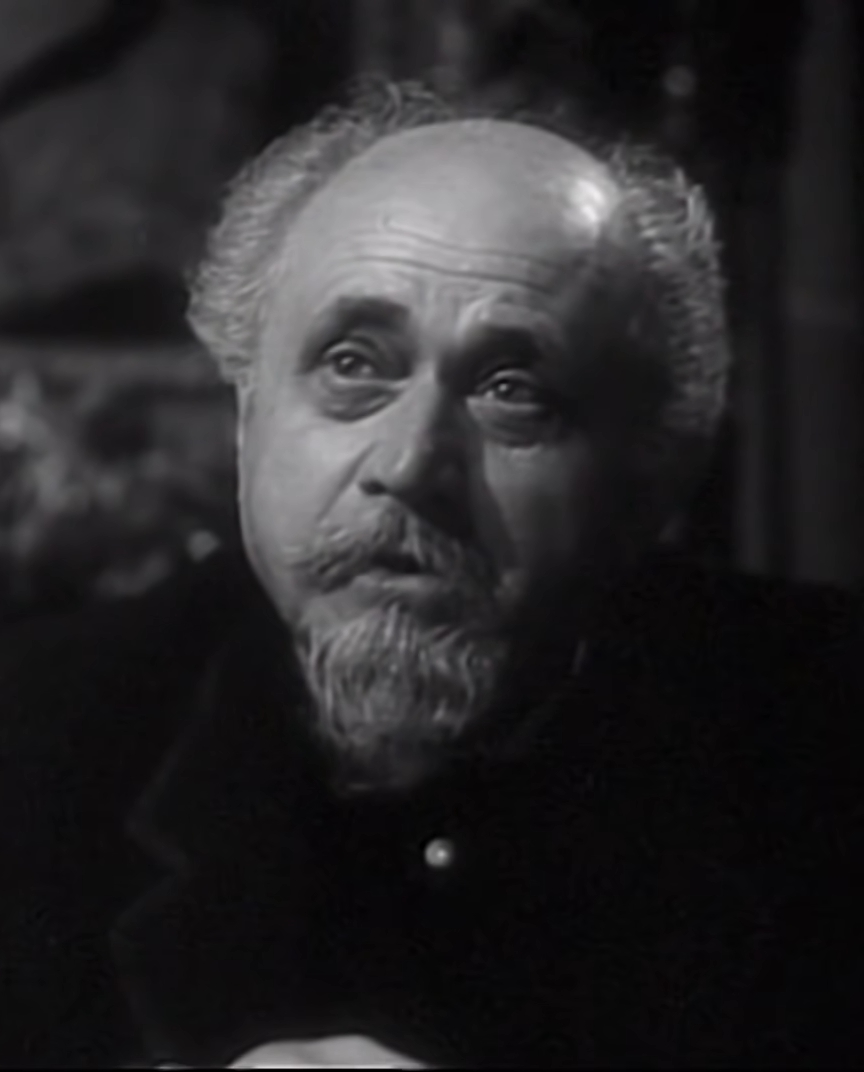
- Stössel in Bluebeard (1944)
- Born: 12 February 1883; Léka, Hungary (now Lockenhaus, Austria)
- Died: 29 January 1973 (aged 89); Hollywood, California, U.S.
- Other names: Ludwig Stoessel; Ludwig Stossel; Ludwig Strossel
- Occupation: Actor
- Years active: 1900–1963
- Spouse: Eleanore Stössel (m. 1919)
- Relatives: Oskar Stössel (brother)

Ludwig Stössel (12 February 1883 – 29 January 1973) was an Austrian actor. He was one of many Jewish actors and actresses who were forced to flee Germany when the Nazis gained power in 1933.

== Biography ==
Stössel began performing on the stage in Austria and Germany when he was only 17. He soon became a successful character actor and performed on the most prestigious stages in Germany, among them the Max Reinhardt, the Barnowsky stage and the Künstlertheater in Berlin. Stössel later became a movie actor. His first motion picture was a small role in the silent movie In der Heimat, da gibt's ein Wiedersehn! (We'll Meet Again in the Homeland) in 1926 at the age of 43. He appeared in about a half dozen silent movies in Germany and landed more roles with the arrival of sound.

Stössel's first sound movie was Georg Wilhelm Pabst's Skandal um Eva (Scandalous Eva) in 1930. The following year, he appeared in Max Neufeld's Opernredoute (The Opera Ball). Later that year, he appeared as a hotel owner in the German comedy Die Koffer des Herrn O.F. (The Suitcases of Mr. O.F.), starring Peter Lorre and Hedy Lamarr. In 1932, he appeared as Riederer in Der Rebell (The Rebel). In 1933, Stössel had a small part in Fritz Lang's famous mystery thriller Das Testament des Dr. Mabuse (The Testament of Dr. Mabuse), a film that was later banned by the Nazi government. His appearance in Carl Boese's 1933 comedy Heimkehr ins Glück (Homecoming to Happiness) would be his last movie in Germany.

When Adolf Hitler came to power in 1933, Stössel was forced to leave Germany because of his Jewish background. He returned to Austria and appeared in a few movies, but he concentrated on the theater. In 1934, he appeared in the comedy Eine Nacht in Venedig (A Night in Venice). His last movie in Austria was in 1937 with Pfarrer von Kirchfeld (The Priest from Kirchfeld). After Hitler's forces took over Austria in the Anschluß of 1938, Stössel was imprisoned several times before he was able to escape Vienna and get to Paris. He and his wife, Lore Birn, eventually reached London. He appeared in Dead Man's Shoes and another British film production before heading to Hollywood in 1939.

Stössel made his American movie debut in 1940, playing a pastor in Czechoslovakia during the Nazi takeover in the wartime drama Four Sons, starring Don Ameche. In 1942, he appeared with Ilka Grüning in Underground. Stössel and Grünig were reunited in the Oscar-nominated Kings Row, starring Ronald Reagan, Ann Sheridan and Claude Rains. Stössel and Grünig also appeared together in the Sonja Henie film Iceland. Later that year, Stössel was cast to play Lou Gehrig's father in Pride of the Yankees starring Gary Cooper in the title role. A few months later, at the age of 59, he played Mr. Leuchtag, who is leaving Europe for America with his wife in Casablanca.

Stössel appeared in supporting roles in over 40 movies after Casablanca, most in the following ten years. The next year, he had a small role in another Humphrey Bogart movie, Action in the North Atlantic. He did a couple of anti-Nazi movies, such as Hitler's Madman (1943), in which he portrayed the mayor of a small town that is wiped out by a Nazi mass execution in reprisal for the assassination of SS Commander Reinhard Heydrich. Later that year, he appeared in The Strange Death of Adolf Hitler.

In 1944, he appeared in the Boris Karloff horror movie The Climax. Later in 1944, Stössel teamed up with his movie wife from Pride of the Yankees, Elsa Janssen, to play Mr. and Mrs. Steelman, a German couple loyal to America who drive their traitorous pro-Nazi son, played by George Sanders (who is actually working undercover for the U.S. government), out of their house in the spy drama They Came to Blow Up America. In 1945, they teamed up again to play Mr. and Mrs. Otto in the "B" crime drama Dillinger. Next, he was bitten in the throat by Count Dracula, played by John Carradine, in House of Dracula. Later in 1945, Stössel played a teacher, who along with a llama, is in the opening scene of the Fred Astaire musical Yolanda and the Thief.

When the Second World War ended in 1945, Stössel decided not to return to Germany like many other German actors and actresses, but remained in his adopted country making movies. In 1946, Grüning and Stössel got to play husband and wife again in Temptation starring Merle Oberon, George Brent and Paul Lukas.

In 1947, he had a small role portraying Albert Einstein in The Beginning or the End. In 1948, he portrayed one of the lonely bachelor professors at a musical research institute in the Danny Kaye musical A Song is Born. In 1949, Grünig and Stössel appeared in their last film together when they received roles in the drama The Great Sinner, starring Gregory Peck and Ava Gardner. In 1953, Stössel played a grand duke in the musical Call Me Madam, starring Ethel Merman and Donald O'Connor. His last film was in 1960, where he had a small role in the Elvis Presley movie G.I. Blues.

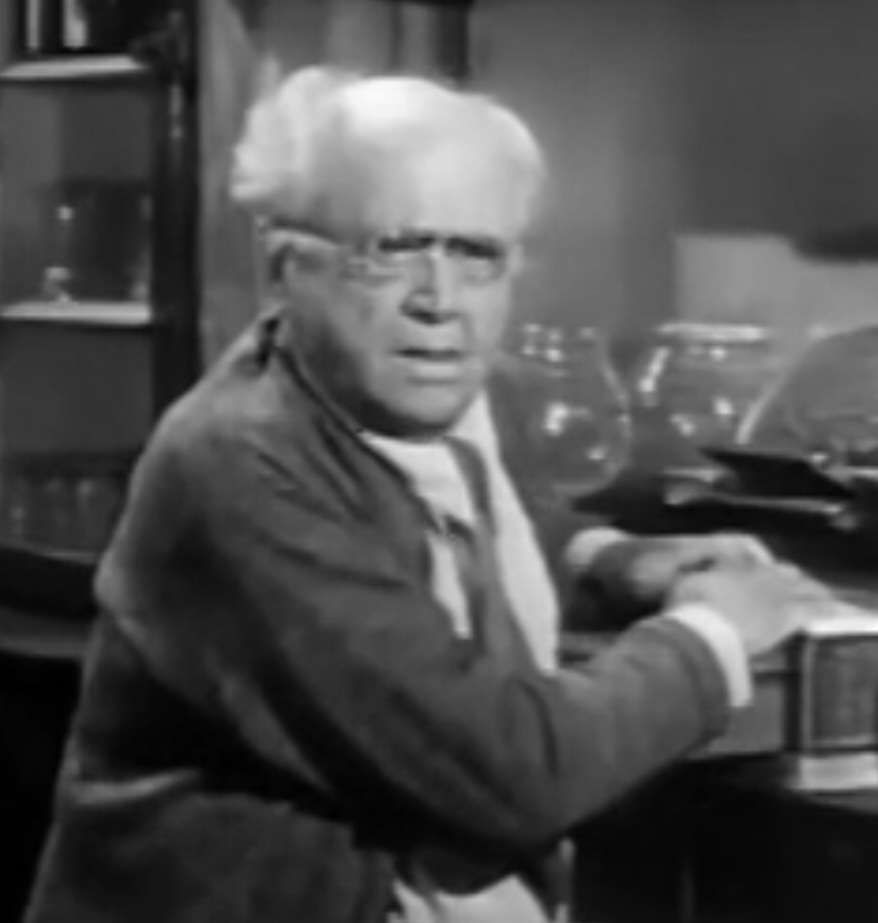
Stössel in an episode of The Public Defender (1954)

Stössel also performed on television. In 1955, he played Ludwig, a Carl the waiter clone, in the television version of Casablanca. He made two guest appearances on Perry Mason during the series' second season, including the role of Adolph Van Beers in "The Case of the Shattered Dream." From 1958 to 1960, Stössel played Charles Bronson's father in ABC's television series Man with a Camera. From 1953 to 1963, Stössel appeared as a guest in a number of television shows, including Cavalcade of America, My Three Sons, The Donna Reed Show, and The New Phil Silvers Show (where he parodied his Gallo wine television commercials). He guest-starred in two Robert Young series, the situation comedy Father Knows Best and the comedy-drama series Window on Main Street.

Stössel became famous for a long series of commercials for Italian Swiss Colony wine producers. Dressed in an Alpine hat and lederhosen, he was their spokesman. His motto was "That Little Old Winemaker, Me!" (they did not use his voice, but had Jim Backus dub the line).

Stössel died on January 29, 1973, in Beverly Hills after a fall just 14 days short of his 90th birthday. He was cremated at Hollywood Forever Cemetery, with the ashes sent to Vienna, Austria.

== Complete filmography ==
- We'll Meet Again in the Heimat (1926) - Freund
- Herkules Maier (1928)
- Serenissimus und die letzte Jungfrau (1928) - Direktor der Florida-Bar
- Aus dem Tagebuch eines Junggesellen (1929) - Herr von Pollak
- Möblierte Zimmer (1929)
- Favorite of Schonbrunn (1929)
- Katharina Knie (1929)
- Heute nacht - eventuell (1930)
- Scandalous Eva (1930) - Dir.Rohrbach
- Ein Burschenlied aus Heidelberg (1930)
- Bockbierfest (1930) - Livius Heintze - Fabrikant
- Die Privatsekretärin (1931) - Personalchef Klapper
- Königin einer Nacht (1931)
- In Wien hab' ich einmal ein Mädel geliebt (1931) - Valentin Rainer - Souffleur
- Elisabeth von Österreich (1931) - Bratfisch
- Opernredoute (1931)
- Alarm at Midnight (1931) - Der Varieté-Agent
- Die Koffer des Herrn O.F. (1931) - Hotelier Brunn
- Man braucht kein Geld (1931)
- Chauffeur Antoinette (1932) - Baron Kiesel
- Nachtkolonne (1932)
- Zum goldenen Anker (1932) - Escartefigue
- Die Gräfin von Monte-Christo (1932)
- Strich durch die Rechnung (1932)
- Der Rebell (1932) - Riederer, Amtshauptmann von St. Vigil
- Das Testament des Dr. Mabuse (1933) - Arbeiter / Worker
- Morgenrot (1933)
- Der Läufer von Marathon (1933)
- Hände aus dem Dunkel (1933) - Generaldirektor Leon
- Johannisnacht (1933) - Theaterdirektor
- Heimkehr ins Glück (1933) - Pichler
- Rund um eine Million (1933) - Der Hoteldirektor
- Nordpol - Ahoi! (1934) - Director
- Eine Nacht in Venedig (1934)
- Der Pfarrer von Kirchfeld (1937) - Vetter, der Pfarrer von Skt. Jakob
- Return to Yesterday (1940) - Capt. Angst
- Dead Man's Shoes (1940) - Dr. Breithaut
- Four Sons (1940) - Pastor
- The Man I Married (1940) - Dr. Gerhardt
- Dance, Girl, Dance (1940) - Caesar
- The Flying Squad (1940) - Li Yoseph
- Jenny (1940) - Fritz Schermer
- Back Street (1941) - Louis (uncredited)
- Man Hunt (1941) - Doctor
- Underground (1941) - Herr Müller
- Down in San Diego (1941) - Brock (uncredited)
- Great Guns (1941) - Dr. Schickel
- Marry the Boss's Daughter (1941) - Franz Polgar
- All Through the Night (1942) - Mr. Herman Miller
- Kings Row (1942) - Professor Berdorff
- Woman of the Year (1942) - Dr. Lubbeck
- I Married an Angel (1942) - Bela (uncredited)
- The Pride of the Yankees (1942) - Pop Gehrig
- Iceland (1942) - Valtyr's Father (uncredited)
- Who Done It? (1942) - Dr. Anton Marek
- Casablanca (1942) - Mr. Leuchtag (uncredited)
- Tennessee Johnson (1942) - Austrian Ambassador (uncredited)
- Pittsburgh (1942) - Dr. Grazlich
- The Great Impersonation (1942) - Dr. Schmidt
- Above Suspicion (1943) - Herr Schultz (uncredited)
- They Came to Blow Up America (1943) - Papa Julius Steelman
- Action in the North Atlantic (1943) - Captain Ziemer (uncredited)
- What We Are Fighting For (1943 short) - Underground Leader
- Hitler's Madman (1943) - Herman Bauer
- Hers to Hold (1943) - Binns
- The Strange Death of Adolf Hitler (1943) - Graub
- The Climax (1944) - Carl Baumann
- Bluebeard (1944) - Jean Lamarte
- Lake Placid Serenade (1944) - Mayor of Lany
- Dillinger (1945) - Mr. Otto
- Her Highness and the Bellboy (1945) - Mr. Puft
- Yolanda and the Thief (1945) - School Teacher
- House of Dracula (1945) - Siegfried
- Girl on the Spot (1946) - "Popsy" Lorenz
- Miss Susie Slagle's (1946) - Otto
- Cloak and Dagger (1946) - The German
- Temptation (1946) - Dr. Mueller
- The Beginning or the End (1947) - Dr. Albert Einstein
- Song of Love (1947) - Haslinger
- This Time for Keeps (1947) - Peter
- Escape Me Never (1947) - Mr. Steinach
- A Song is Born (1948) - Professor Traumer
- The Great Sinner (1949) - Hotel Manager
- As Young as You Feel (1951) - Serge Toulevitsky (uncredited)
- Corky of Gasoline Alley (1951) - Dr. Hammerschlag (uncredited)
- Too Young to Kiss (1951) - German Piano Accompanist (uncredited)
- The Last Half Hour: The Mayerling Story (1951 TV movie) - Bratfisch, Coachman
- Diplomatic Courier (1952) - Watchmaker (uncredited)
- The Merry Widow (1952) - Major Domo
- Somebody Loves Me (1952) - Mr. D.J. Grauman (uncredited)
- No Time for Flowers (1952) - Papa Svoboda
- The Sun Shines Bright (1953) - Herman Felsburg
- Call Me Madam (1953) - Grand Duke Otto
- Geraldine (1953) - Professor Berger
- With This Ring (1954 short)
- Lady in the Wings (1954 TV movie)
- Deep in My Heart (1954) - Mr. Novak (uncredited)
- Science Fiction Theater (1956) - Episode "Sound That Kills"
- Me and the Colonel (1958) - Dr. Szicki
- From the Earth to the Moon (1958) - Aldo Von Metz
- The Blue Angel (1959) - Dr. Fritz Heine
- G.I. Blues (1960) - Owner of Puppet Show
