= Figaro (Vienna) =

Austrian German-language satirical magazine (1857 to 1919)

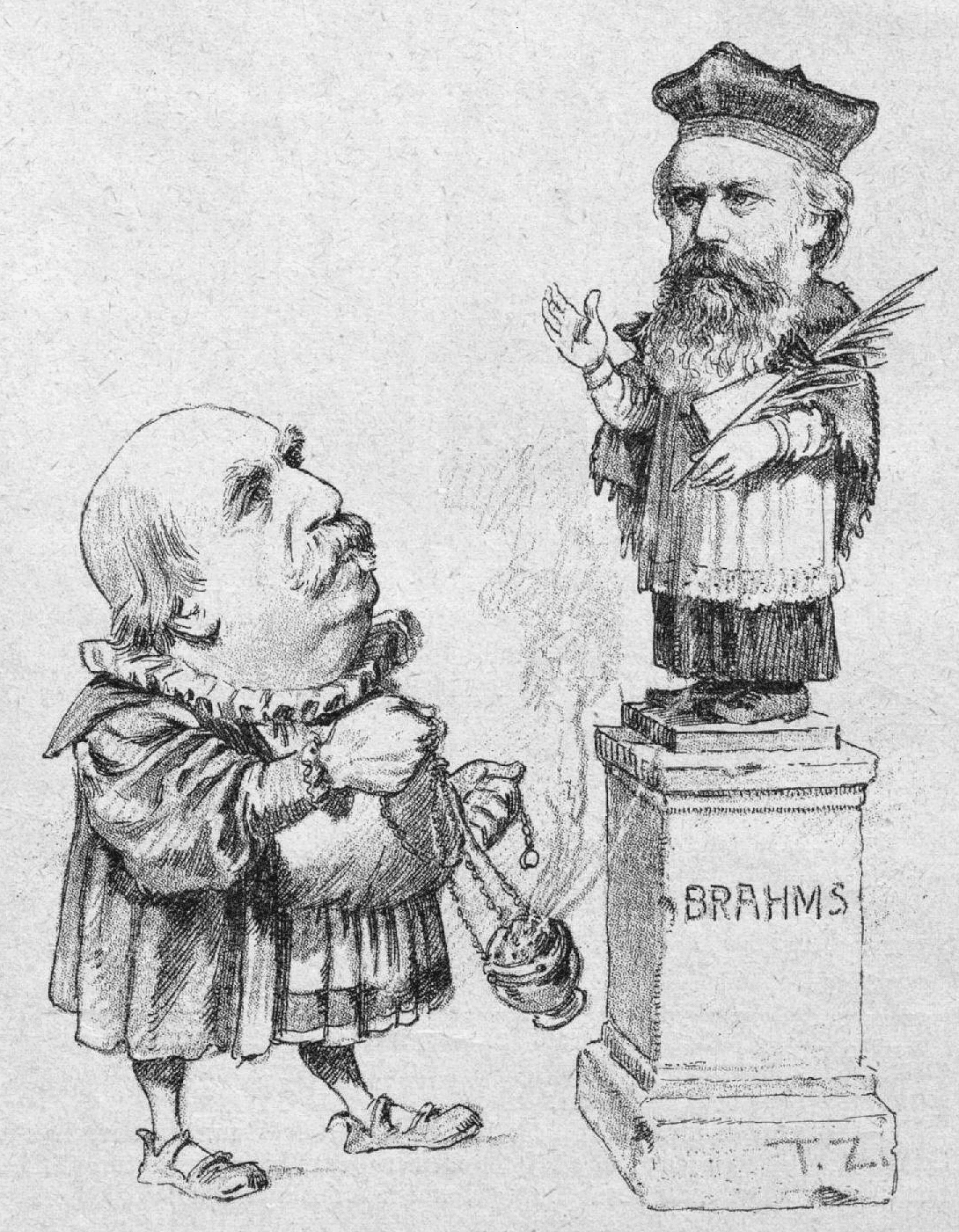
Eduard Hanslick offering incense to Brahms; cartoon from the Viennese 'Figaro', 1890

The Figaro was an Austrian German-language satirical magazine, published weekly in Vienna between 1857 and 1919. Its orientation was liberal-humorous.

It was founded by Karl Sitter. Between 1884 and 1889 the playwright Ludwig Anzengruber was a contributing editor - which was cut short by Anzengruber's premature death. In 1876 Friedrich Schlögl, who had been working in the magazine since 1857, founded the supplement "Wiener Luft". The magazine ceased publication in 1919, during the period of crisis following the dissolution of the Habsburg monarchy.
