= The Merry Farmer (1951 film) =

1951 film

- Directed by: Georg Marischka
- Written by: Viktor Léon (libretto); Hubert Marischka; Rudolf Österreicher
- Produced by: Eduard Hoesch
- Starring: Paul Hörbiger; Erich Auer; Heinrich Gretler
- Cinematography: Hans Schneeberger
- Edited by: Leopoldine Pokorny
- Music by: Leo Fall
- Production companies: Berna-Filmproduktion; Donau-Film Wien
- Distributed by: Union-Film
- Release date: 21 September 1951
- Running time: 105 minutes
- Country: Austria
- Language: German

The Merry Farmer (German: Der fidele Bauer) is a 1951 Austrian musical comedy film directed by Georg Marischka and starring Paul Hörbiger, Erich Auer, Heinrich Gretler. An operetta film, it is an adaptation of the 1907 operetta The Merry Farmer composed by Leo Fall.

It was shot at the Sievering Studios in Vienna. The film's sets were designed by the art director Gustav Abel.

== Cast ==
- Paul Hörbiger as Matthias Scheichelroither
- Erich Auer as Heini Scheichelroither
- Heinrich Gretler as Lindoberer
- Franz Marischka as Vinzenz Lindoberer
- Rudolf Carl as Raudaschl
- Helli Servi as Annamirl Raudaschl
- Elisabeth Karlan as Resi Scheichelroither
- Marianne Wischmann as Vivian Harrison
- Alma Seidler as Mrs. Harrison
- Adrienne Gessner as Frau Holefka
- Ulrich Bettac as Mr. Harrison
- Karli Obrich as Heinerle als Kind
- Fritz von Friedl as Vinzenz als Kind
- Loni von Friedl as Annamirl als Kind
- Hans Hais as Napoleon im Film
- Karl Eidlitz as Talleyrand im Film
- Gertrude Decombe
- Erich Dörner
- Karl Ehmann as Lehrer
- C.W. Fernbach
- Anton Gaugl
- Karl Günther
- Fritz Heller
- Egon von Jordan
- Fritz Muliar as Kinobesucher
- Johannes Roth
- Emmerich Schrenk
- Hans Steilau

== Bibliography ==
- Fritsche, Maria. Homemade Men in Postwar Austrian Cinema: Nationhood, Genre and Masculinity. Berghahn Books, 2013.
