= Ludwig Anzengruber =

Austrian dramatist, novelist and poet

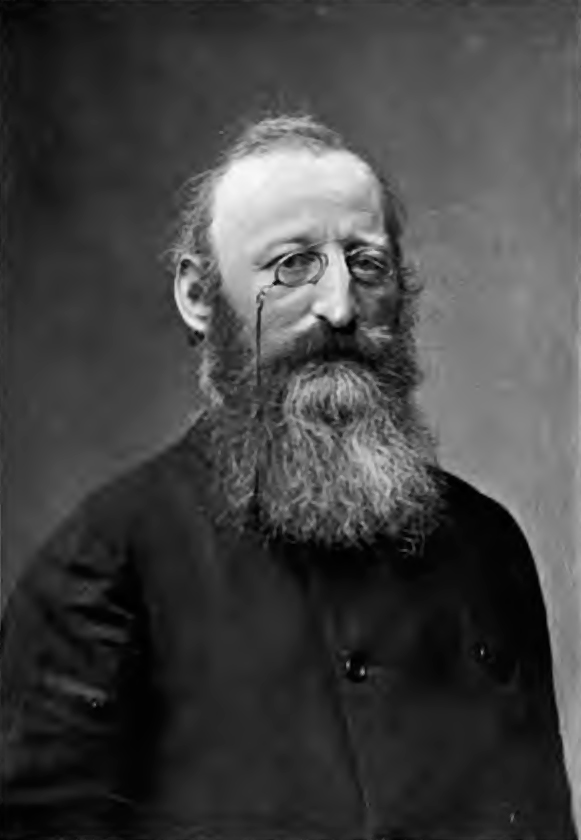
Ludwig Anzengruber.

Ludwig Anzengruber (29 November 1839 – 10 December 1889) was an Austrian dramatist, novelist and poet. He was born and died in Vienna, Austria.

== Origins ==
The Anzengruber line originated in the district of Ried im Innkreis in Upper Austria. Ludwig's grandfather, Jakob Anzengruber, was a farm-worker on the Obermayr estate at Weng near Hofkirchen an der Trattnach. His father, Johann Anzengruber, left the family home at an early age and moved to Vienna, where he found work as a bookkeeper in the treasury of the Austrian crown lands. In 1838 he married Maria Herbich, the daughter of a petit bourgeois pharmacist. It is not surprising that the social standing of his parents – his father, from peasant stock, and his mother, a petty bourgeois – regularly played an important role in Ludwig Anzengruber's later works.

Ludwig's greatest influence in becoming a dramatist was his father who himself had been a secret poet in the style of Friedrich Schiller, but without success. Only one of his plays, on the subject of Berthold Schwarz, was produced, and probably only because of the spectacular explosion at the end; his other works gathered dust in the drawer of his desk.

== Early life and career ==
Ludwig was only 5 years old when his father died in 1844. His mother, who was to become the most important person in his life as the years went on, tried to make ends meet with her meager widow's pension of 166 guilders and 40 kreuzers. In 1854 when Ludwig's grandmother, who had been supporting her daughter and grandchild substantially, died, his home and living arrangements became even worse. Financial emergencies drained their savings, but Ludwig's mother was ready to make any sacrifice (including taking up work as a seamstress) so that he could study at the Paulaner elementary school from 1847 to 1850 and then at the Piarist high school from 1851 to 1853. In 1855 he dropped out of school due to increasingly bad grades and from 1856 to 1858 he was an apprentice at the Sallmeyer bookstore. During his employment at the bookstore he was able to read a great deal, but after disagreements with his master his apprenticeship came to an abrupt end.

At the age of 19, after a severe bout of typhoid, Ludwig decided to become an actor. Over the next ten years he tried his luck as a professional actor, travelling with different acting troupes throughout the provinces of Austria. He worked as a supporting actor in many a second-rate theatre, without, however, displaying any marked talent, and he never made the breakthrough to success, although his stage experience later stood him in good stead. One thing that hindered him was the dialect that he spoke, a dialect he was never able completely to get rid of. From 1866 he returned to live in Vienna again. During this time he wrote several dramas and some short stories, but these were unsuccessful.

== Creative period ==
In 1869 he found his way back into bourgeois society, when he took a job as a clerk (probably because he badly needed money) in the imperial police headquarters in Vienna. In 1870, under the pseudonym L. Gruber, he wrote what was to be his breakthrough, his anti-clerical drama Der Pfarrer von Kirchfeld (The Priest from Kirchfeld). The play was first produced at the Theater an der Wien, and its premiere on 5 November was a great success. Heinrich Laube, the head of the Burgtheater, wrote an enthusiastic review and through this Ludwig struck up a friendship with Peter Rosegger. His overnight success meant that the police official (4th class) could step off the career ladder of the civil service and devote himself entirely to literature, which saved him from conflict between being a poet and his duty to his office.

In 1873, despite his mother's warnings, Anzengruber married the 16-year-old Adelinde Lipka (1857–1914). His young bride, the sister of his childhood friend Franz Lipka, was not up to the demands of practical life, and thus there were repeated crises in their marriage, although Ludwig's considerable debts and very close relationship with his mother, who died in 1875, were often also to blame for this. Despite their three children, divorce was inevitable, and in 1889 the couple separated officially.

The following years were very successful for Anzengruber. His plays were produced throughout Europe, though his mother was never able to fully share in his success, as she had died in 1875. From April 1882 until May 1885 he was the editor of the Viennese paper Die Heimat (The Homeland), in May 1884 he became a contributing editor of the Viennese weekly magazine Figaro and in August 1888 he became the editor of the Wiener Bote (Vienna Messenger).

In September 1888 he was given the position of dramaturg for the Volkstheater Wien in Vienna, which opened on 14 September 1889 with his piece Der Fleck auf der Ehr (The Stain on Honour).

At the end of November, the dramatist, who was only fifty years old, became sick with anthrax, and not two weeks later died as a result of blood poisoning.

== Selected works ==
=== Dramas ===
Most of Anzengruber's plays deal with Austrian peasant life. They are somewhat melancholy in tone, but interspersed with bright and witty scenes.

- Der Pfarrer von Kirchfeld (The Priest from Kirchfeld) (folk play with music in 4 acts) - Premiere: Theater an der Wien – 5. November 1870
- Der Meineidbauer (The Perjuring Farmer) (folk play with music in 3 acts) - Premiere: Theater an der Wien – 9 December 1871
- Die Kreuzelschreiber (peasant comedy with music in 3 acts) - Premiere: Theater an der Wien – 12 October 1872
- Elfriede (play in 3 acts) - UA: Carl-Theater – 24. April 1873
- Die Tochter des Wucherers (The Usurer's Daughter) (Play with music in 5 acts) - Premiere: Theater an der Wien – 17 October 1873
- Der G'wissenswurm (The Worm of Conscience) (peasant comedy with music in 3 acts) - Premiere: Theater an der Wien – 19. September 1874
- Hand und Herz (Hand and Heart) (tragedy in 4 acts) - Premiere: Wiener Stadttheater – 31 December 1874
- Doppelselbstmord (Double Suicide) (tragedy in 3 acts) - Premiere: Theater an der Wien – 1 February 1876
- Der ledige Hof (play in 4 Acts) - UA: Theater an der Wien – 27 January 1877
- Das vierte Gebot (The Fourth Commandment) (play in 4 acts) - Premiere: Josefstädter Theater – 29 December 1878

=== Novels ===
- Der Schandfleck (The Mark of Shame) - 1st edition: 1877; 2nd edition: 1884
- Der Sternsteinhof (The Sternstein Manor) - 1885

Anzengruber also published various short stories and tales of village life collected under the title Wolken und Sunn'schein (1888).

== See also ==
- List of Austrian writers
