= Leo Fall =

Austrian composer (1873–1925)

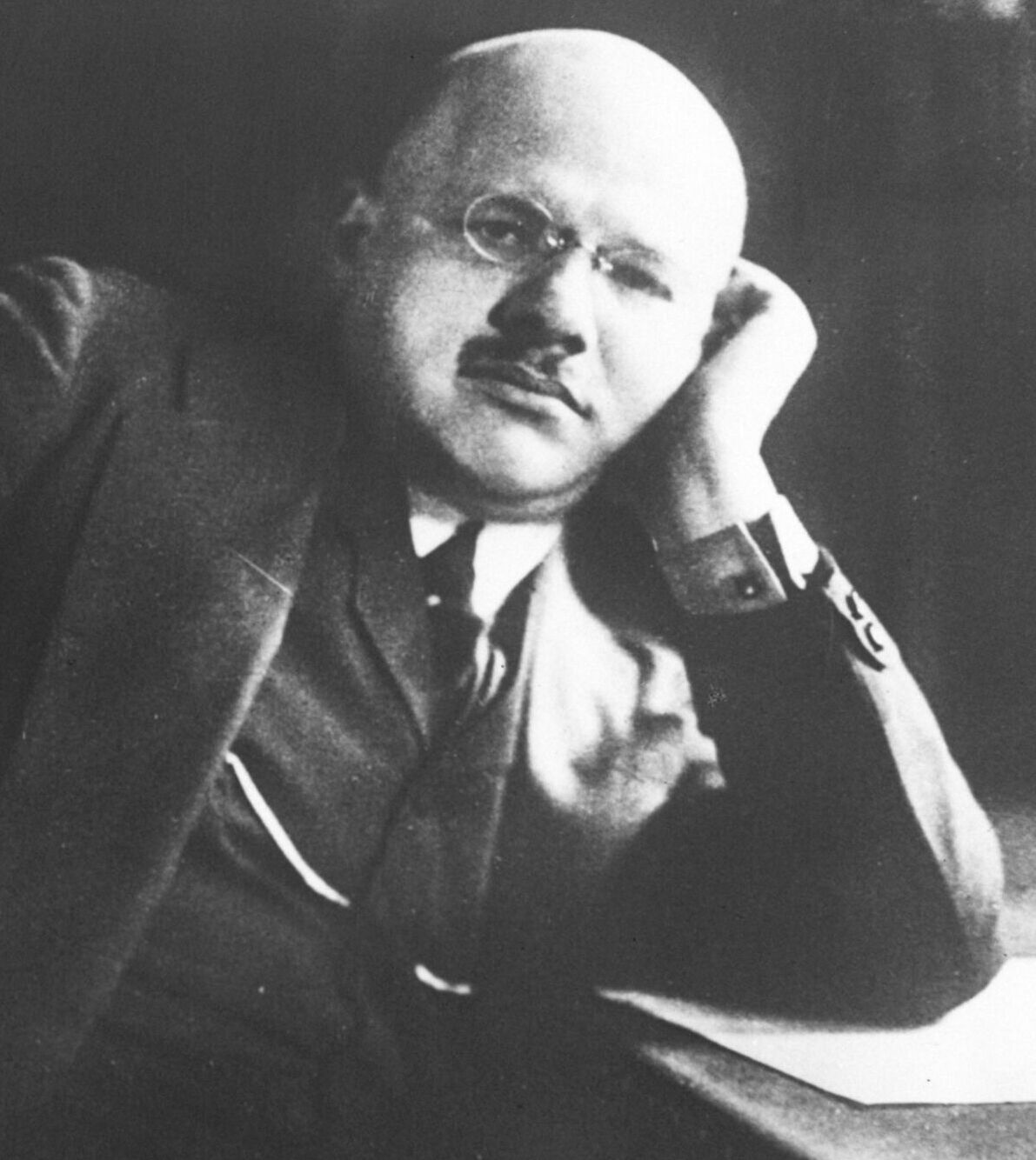
Leo Fall, 1915; by Rudolf Dührkoop

Leopold Fall (2 February 1873 – 16 September 1925) was an Austrian Kapellmeister and composer of operettas.

== Life ==
Born in Olmütz, Leo (or Leopold) Fall was taught by his father Moritz Fall (1848–1922), a bandmaster and composer, who settled in Berlin. The younger Fall studied at the Vienna Conservatory before rejoining his father in Berlin. His teachers in Vienna were Robert Fuchs and Johann Nepomuk Fuchs. In 1895, he began a new career as an operetta conductor in Hamburg and started to compose. From 1904 onwards, he devoted himself to composition. While less successful than his contemporary Franz Lehár, he was nevertheless capable of producing melodious and well-orchestrated work. After working in Berlin, Hamburg and Cologne, he settled in Vienna in 1906, where he died. He is buried at the Vienna Central Cemetery.

His brothers Siegfried and Richard were also composers; both were murdered in the Nazi concentration camps.

His best-known operettas in the English-speaking world are The Dollar Princess and Madame Pompadour, which had successful runs in London and New York and remained in the repertory in Germany and Austria throughout the 20th century. Der liebe Augustin (1912; Princess Caprice in London) is reported to have been given an unprecedented 3,360 performances.

== Stage works ==
Fall wrote incidental music to numerous plays, and three unsuccessful operas; he is mainly known as a composer of operettas in the Silver Age of Vienna operetta.

Operas:

- Paroli oder Frau Denise (1 act; 1902)
- Irrlicht (1905)
- Der goldene Vogel (1920)

Operettas:

- Der Rebell (Vienna, 1905), later reworked as Der liebe Augustin
- The Merry Farmer (Der fidele Bauer, Mannheim, 1907)
- Die Dollarprinzessin (Vienna, 1907; adapted into English as The Dollar Princess 1909)
- Die geschiedene Frau (Vienna, 1908; adapted into English as The Girl in the Train 1910)
- Der Schrei nach der Ohrfeige (Vienna, 1909)
- Brüderlein fein (Vienna, 1909)
- Das Puppenmädel (Vienna, 1910)
- Die schöne Risette (Vienna, 1910)
- Die Sirene (Vienna, 1911; adapted into English as The Siren 1911)
- The Eternal Waltz (London, 1911)
- Der liebe Augustin (Berlin, 1912) (Princess Caprice) (performed 3,360 times)
- Die Studentengräfin (Berlin, 1913)
- Der Nachtschnellzug (Vienna, 1913)
- Der Frau Ministerpräsident (Berlin, 1914)
- Der künstliche Mensch (Berlin, 1915)
- Die Kaiserin (Fürstenliebe) (Berlin, 1916)
- The Rose of Stamboul (Vienna, 1916)
- Die spanische Nachtigall (Berlin, 1920)
- Der heilige Ambrosius (Berlin, 1921)
- Die Straßensängerin (Vienna, 1922)
- Madame Pompadour (Berlin, 1922)
- Der süße Kavalier (Berlin, 1923)
- Jugend im Mai (Dresden, 1926)
