= List of feature film series with 21 to 30 entries =

This article lists film series having between 21 and 30 entries.

Key:

- (A) – Film series is 100% animated
- (a) – Film series is not 100% animated and has live action in a sequel or prequel
- (TV) – made-for-TV
- (V) – direct-to-video
- (*) – TV series attached

== 21 ==
- The Mummy *
  1. The Mummy (1932)
  2. The Mummy's Hand (1940)
  3. The Mummy's Tomb (1942)
  4. The Mummy's Ghost (1944)
  5. The Mummy's Curse (1944)
  6. Abbott and Costello Meet the Mummy (1955) (crossover)
  7. The Mummy (1959) (reboot)
  8. The Curse of the Mummy's Tomb (1964) (reboot)
  9. The Mummy's Shroud (1967) (reboot)
  10. Blood from the Mummy's Tomb (1971) (reboot)
  11. The Mummy (1999) (remake)
  12. The Mummy Returns (2001) (remake)
  13. The Scorpion King (2002) (spin-off)
  14. The Mummy: Tomb of the Dragon Emperor (2008) (remake)
  15. The Scorpion King 2: Rise of a Warrior (2008) (V) (spin-off)
  16. The Scorpion King 3: Battle for Redemption (2012) (V) (spin-off)
  17. The Scorpion King 4: Quest for Power (2015) (V) (spin-off)
  18. The Mummy (2017) (reboot)
  19. The Scorpion King: Book of Souls (2018) (V) (spin-off)
  20. Lee Cronin's The Mummy (2026) (reboot)
  21. The Mummy: Book of the Dead (2027) (retcon)
- Friday the 13th ** vs. A Nightmare on Elm Street *
  1. Friday the 13th (1980)
  2. Friday the 13th Part 2 (1981)
  3. Friday the 13th Part III (1982)
  4. Friday the 13th: The Final Chapter (1984)
  5. A Nightmare on Elm Street (1984)
  6. Friday the 13th: A New Beginning (1985)
  7. A Nightmare on Elm Street 2: Freddy's Revenge (1985)
  8. Friday the 13th Part VI: Jason Lives (1986)
  9. A Nightmare on Elm Street 3: Dream Warriors (1987)
  10. Friday the 13th Part VII: The New Blood (1988)
  11. A Nightmare on Elm Street 4: The Dream Master (1988)
  12. Friday the 13th Part VIII: Jason Takes Manhattan (1989)
  13. A Nightmare on Elm Street 5: The Dream Child (1989)
  14. Freddy's Dead: The Final Nightmare (1991)
  15. Jason Goes to Hell: The Final Friday (1993)
  16. Wes Craven's New Nightmare (1994) (standalone film)
  17. Jason X (2001)
  18. Freddy vs. Jason (2003) (crossover)
  19. Friday the 13th (2009) (reboot)
  20. A Nightmare on Elm Street (2010) (remake)
  21. Jason (2027) (reboot)
- Mil Máscaras
  1. Mil Máscaras (1966)
  2. Los Canallas (The Scoundrels) (1966)
  3. Las Vampiras (The Vampire Girls) (1968)
  4. Enigma de Muerte (Enigma of Death) (1968)
  5. Los Campeones Justicieros (The Champions of Justice) (1970)
  6. Las Momias de Guanajuato (The Mummies of Guanajuato) (1970)
  7. El Robo de las Momias de Guanajuato (The Theft of the Mummies of Guanajuato) (1972)
  8. Vuelven los Campeones Justicieros (The Champions of Justice Return) (1972)
  9. Una Rosa Sobre el Ring (A Rose in the Ring) (1972)
  10. Leyendas Macabras de la Colonia (Macabre Legends of the Colony) (1973)
  11. Los Vampiros de Coyoacán (The Vampires of Coyoacán) (1973)
  12. Las Momias de San Ángel (The Mummies of San Ángel) (1973)
  13. El Poder Negro (Black Power) (1973)
  14. Misterio en las Bermudas (Mystery In Bermuda) (1977)
  15. El Hijo de Santo en la Frontera Sin Ley (Son of Santo in the Lawless Frontier) (1983)
  16. La Verdad de la Lucha (The Truth About Wrestling) (1988)
  17. La Llave Mortal (The Deadly Wrestling Hold) (1990)
  18. Mil Mascaras vs. the Aztec Mummy (2007) (aka Mil Mascaras: Resurrection)
  19. Academy of Doom (2007) (formerly called Wrestling Women vs. the Brainiac)
  20. Mil Máscaras: Héroe (Mil Máscaras, Hero) (2008)
  21. Mil Mascaras: Aztec Revenge (2015)

== 22 ==
- Spider-Man (a) *****
  1. Spider-Man (1977)
  2. Spider-Man (1978)
  3. Spider-Man Strikes Back (1979)
  4. Spider-Man: The Dragon's Challenge (1981)
  5. Spider-Man (2002)
  6. Spider-Man 2 (2004)
  7. Spider-Man 3 (2007)
  8. The Amazing Spider-Man (2012) (reboot)
  9. The Amazing Spider-Man 2 (2014) (reboot)
  10. Spider-Man: Homecoming (2017) (reboot)
  11. Venom (2018) (spin-off)
  12. Spider-Man: Into the Spider-Verse (2018) (A)
  13. Spider-Man: Far From Home (2019) (reboot)
  14. Venom: Let There Be Carnage (2021) (spin-off)
  15. Spider-Man: No Way Home (2021) (reboot)
  16. Morbius (2022) (spin-off)
  17. Spider-Man: Across the Spider-Verse (2023) (A)
  18. Madame Web (2024) (spin-off)
  19. Venom: The Last Dance (2024) (spin-off)
  20. Kraven the Hunter (2024) (spin-off)
  21. Spider-Man: Brand New Day (2026) (reboot)
  22. Spider-Man: Beyond the Spider-Verse (2027) (A)
- East Side Kids
  1. East Side Kids (1940)
  2. Boys of the City (1940)
  3. That Gang of Mine (1940)
  4. Pride of the Bowery (1940)
  5. Flying Wild (1941)
  6. Bowery Blitzkrieg (1941)
  7. Spooks Run Wild (1941)
  8. Mr. Wise Guy (1942)
  9. Let's Get Tough! (1942)
  10. Smart Alecks (1942)
  11. 'Neath Brooklyn Bridge (1942)
  12. Kid Dynamite (1943)
  13. Clancy Street Boys (1943)
  14. Ghosts on the Loose (1943)
  15. Mr. Muggs Steps Out (1943)
  16. Million Dollar Kid (1944)
  17. Follow the Leader (1944)
  18. Block Busters (1944)
  19. Bowery Champs (1944)
  20. Docks of New York (1945)
  21. Mr. Muggs Rides Again (1945)
  22. Come Out Fighting (1945)
- Tales for All
  1. The Dog Who Stopped the War (1984)
  2. The Peanut Butter Solution (1985)
  3. Bach and Broccoli (1986)
  4. The Young Magician (1987)
  5. The Great Land of Small (1987)
  6. The Tadpole and the Whale (1997)
  7. Tommy Tricker and the Stamp Traveller (1988)
  8. Summer of the Colt (1991)
  9. Bye Bye, Red Riding Hood (1989)
  10. The Case of the Witch Who Wasn't (1990)
  11. Vincent and Me (1990)
  12. Reach for the Sky (1990)
  13. The Clean Machine (1992)
  14. The Flying Sneaker (1990)
  15. The Return of Tommy Tricker (1994) (Sequel to Tommy Tricker and the Stamp Traveller)
  16. Dancing on the Moon (1997)
  17. Letters from Santa (2000)
  18. My Little Devil (1999)
  19. Regina (2001)
  20. The Hidden Fortress (2001)
  21. Summer with the Ghosts (2003)
  22. Daniel and The Superdogs (2004)
- Texas Rangers
  1. The Rangers Take Over (1942)
  2. Bad Men of Thunder Gap (1943)
  3. Border Buckaroos (1943)
  4. Boss of Rawhide (1943)
  5. Fighting Valley (1943)
  6. The Return of the Rangers (1943)
  7. Trail of Terror (1943)
  8. West of Texas (1943)
  9. Brand of the Devil (1944)
  10. Dead or Alive (1944)
  11. Gangsters of the Frontier (1944)
  12. Guns of the Law (1944)
  13. Gunsmoke Mesa (1944)
  14. Outlaw Roundup (1944)
  15. The Pinto Bandit (1944)
  16. Spook Town (1944)
  17. The Whispering Skull (1944)
  18. Enemy of the Law (1945)
  19. Flaming Bullets (1945)
  20. Frontier Fugitives (1945)
  21. Marked for Murder (1945)
  22. Three in the Saddle (1945)
- The Adventures of Young Indiana Jones *
  1. Mystery of the Blues (Chapter 20) (1993) (TV)
  2. Scandal of 1920 (Chapter 21) (1993) (TV)
  3. Phantom Train of Doom (Chapter 10) (1993) (TV)
  4. Hollywood Follies (Chapter 22) (1994) (TV)
  5. Treasure of the Peacock's Eye (Chapter 18) (1995) (TV)
  6. Attack of the Hawkmen (Chapter 12) (1995) (TV)
  7. Tales of Innocence (Chapter 16) (1999) (V)
  8. Spring Break Adventure (Chapter 6) (1999) (V)
  9. Trenches of Hell (Chapter 8) (1999) (V)
  10. Demons of Deception (Chapter 9) (1999) (V)
  11. Oganga, The Giver and Taker of Life (Chapter 11) (1999) (V)
  12. Adventures in the Secret Service (Chapter 13) (1999) (V)
  13. Daredevils of the Desert (Chapter 15) (1999) (V)
  14. Masks of Evil (Chapter 17) (1999) (V)
  15. My First Adventure (Chapter 1) (2000) (TV)
  16. Journey of Radiance (Chapter 5) (2000) (TV)
  17. Love's Sweet Song (Chapter 7) (2000) (TV)
  18. Passion for Life (Chapter 2) (2000) (TV)
  19. The Perils of Cupid (Chapter 3) (2000) (TV)
  20. Travels with Father (Chapter 4) (2007) (V)
  21. Espionage Escapades (Chapter 14) (2007) (V)
  22. Winds of Change (Chapter 19) (2008) (V)
- Tsuribaka Nisshi
  1. Tsuribaka Nisshi (1988)
  2. Tsuribaka Nisshi 2 (1989)
  3. Tsuribaka Nisshi 3 (1990)
  4. Tsuribaka Nisshi 4 (1991)
  5. Tsuribaka Nisshi 5 (1992)
  6. Tsuribaka Nisshi 6 (1993)
  7. Tsuribaka Nisshi Special (1994)
  8. Tsuribaka Nisshi 7 (1994)
  9. Tsuribaka Nisshi 8 (1996)
  10. Tsuribaka Nisshi 9 (1997)
  11. Tsuribaka Nisshi 10 (1998)
  12. Hana no O-Edo no Tsuribaka Nisshi (1998)
  13. Tsuribaka Nisshi Eleven (2000)
  14. Tsuribaka Nisshi 12: Shijo Saidai no Yukyu Kyuka (2001)
  15. Tsuribaka Nisshi 13: Hama-chan Kiki Ippatsu! (2002)
  16. Tsuribaka Nisshi 14: O-Henro Dai Panic! (2003)
  17. Tsuribaka Nisshi 15: Hama-chan ni Ashita wa nai!? (2004)
  18. Tsuribaka Nisshi 16: Hamasaki wa Kyou mo Dama datta (2005)
  19. Tsuribaka Nisshi 17: Ato wa Noto nare Hama to nare! (2006)
  20. Tsuribaka Nisshi 18: Hama-chan Su-san Seto no Yakusoku (2007)
  21. Tsuribaka Nisshi 19: Yokoso! Suzuki Kensetsu Goikko Sama (2008)
  22. Tsuribaka Nisshi 20: Final (2009)

== 23 ==
- Puppet Master vs. Dollman vs. Demonic Toys
  1. Puppet Master (1989) (V)
  2. Puppet Master II (1990) (V)
  3. Puppet Master III: Toulon's Revenge (1991) (V) (prequel)
  4. Dollman (1991) (V)
  5. Demonic Toys (1992) (V)
  6. Dollman vs. Demonic Toys (1993) (V) (crossover)
  7. Puppet Master 4 (1993) (V)
  8. Puppet Master 5: The Final Chapter (1994) (V)
  9. Curse of the Puppet Master (1998) (V)
  10. Retro Puppet Master (1999) (V) (prequel)
  11. Puppet Master: The Legacy (V) (2003)
  12. Puppet Master vs Demonic Toys (2004) (TV) (crossover)
  13. Demonic Toys 2 (2010) (V)
  14. Puppet Master: Axis of Evil (2010) (V) (prequel)
  15. Puppet Master X: Axis Rising (2012) (V) (prequel)
  16. Puppet Master: Axis Termination (2017) (V) (prequel)
  17. Puppet Master: The Littlest Reich (2018) (V) (reboot)
  18. Blade: The Iron Cross (2020) (V) (spin-off)
  19. Baby Oopsie (2021) (V) (spin-off)
  20. Puppet Master: Doktor Death (2022) (V) (spin-off)
  21. Baby Oopsie 2: Murder Dolls (2022) (V) (spin-off)
  22. Baby Oopsie 3: Burn Baby Burn (2022) (V) (spin-off)
  23. Demonic Toys: Jack-Attack (2023) (V) (spin-off)
- Åsa-Nisse
  1. Åsa-Nisse (1949)
  2. Åsa-Nisse Goes Hunting (1950)
  3. Åsa-Nisse på nya äventyr (1952)
  4. Åsa-Nisse on Holiday (1953)
  5. Åsa-Nisse på hal is (1954)
  6. Åsa-Nisse ordnar allt (1955)
  7. Åsa-Nisse flyger i luften (1956)
  8. Åsa-Nisse i full fart (1957)
  9. Åsa-Nisse i kronans kläder (1958)
  10. Åsa-Nisse jubilerar (1959)
  11. Åsa-Nisse som polis (1960)
  12. Åsa-Nisse bland grevar och baroner (1961)
  13. Åsa-Nisse på Mallorca (1962)
  14. Åsa-Nisse och tjocka släkten (1963)
  15. Åsa-Nisse i popform (1964)
  16. Åsa-Nisse slår till (1965)
  17. Dessa fantastiska smålänningar med sina finurliga maskiner (1966)
  18. Åsa-Nisse i raketform (1966)
  19. Åsa-Nisse i agentform (1967)
  20. Sarons ros och gubbarna i Knohult (1968)
  21. Åsa-Nisse och den stora kalabaliken (1968)
  22. Åsa-Nisse i rekordform (1969)
  23. Åsa-Nisse – wälkom to Knohult (2011)
- Karl May
  1. On the Brink of Paradise (1920)
  2. Caravan of Death (1920)
  3. The Devil Worshippers (1920)
  4. Across the Desert (1936)
  5. Die Sklavenkarawane (1958)
  6. Der Löwe von Babylon (1959)
  7. Treasure of Silver Lake (1962)
  8. Apache Gold (1963)
  9. Old Shatterhand (1964) (aka Apaches Last Battle)
  10. The Shoot (1964)
  11. Last of the Renegades (1964)
  12. Among Vultures (1964) (aka Frontier Hellcat)
  13. The Treasure of the Aztecs (1965)
  14. The Pyramid of the Sun God (1965)
  15. The Oil Prince (1965) (aka Rampage at Apache Wells)
  16. Wild Kurdistan (1965)
  17. The Desperado Trail (1965)
  18. Old Surehand (1965) (aka Flaming Frontier)
  19. Kingdom of the Silver Lion (1965)
  20. Legacy of the Incas (1965)
  21. Winnetou and the Crossbreed (1966)
  22. Winnetou and Old Firehand (1966)
  23. The Valley of Death (1968)
- Moments of Truth
  1. Shattered Dreams (1990) (TV)
  2. Moment of Truth: Why My Daughter? (1993) (TV)
  3. Stalking Back (1993) (TV)
  4. A Child Too Many (1993) (TV)
  5. Murder or Memory? (1994) (TV)
  6. Moment of Truth: Cradle of Conspiracy (1994) (TV)
  7. Broken Pledges (1994) (TV)
  8. Caught in the Crossfire (1994) (TV)
  9. To Walk Again (1994) (TV)
  10. Moment of Truth: A Mother's Deception a.k.a. Cult Rescue (1994)
  11. Deceived by Trust (1995) (TV)
  12. Eye of the Stalker (1995) (TV)
  13. The Other Mother (1998) (TV)
  14. Stand Against Fear (1995) (TV)
  15. Abduction of Innocence (1995) (TV)
  16. When Friendship Kills a.k.a. A Secret Between Friends (1996) (TV)
  17. Justice for Annie: A Moment of Truth Movie (1996) (TV)
  18. Accident aka Reckless Nights: The Accident (1997) (TV)
  19. Into the Arms of Danger (1997) (TV)
  20. Playing to Win (1998) (TV)
  21. Someone to Love Me (1998) (TV)
  22. A Champion's Fight (1998) (TV)
  23. Broken Silence a.k.a. Race Against Fear (1998) (TV)
- Taboo
  1. Taboo (1980)
  2. Taboo 2 (1982)
  3. Taboo 3 - The Final Chapter (1984)
  4. Taboo 4 - The Younger Generation (1985)
  5. Taboo 5 - The Secret (1987)
  6. Taboo 6 - The Obsession (1988)
  7. Taboo 7: The Wild And The Innocent (1989)
  8. Taboo 8 (1990)
  9. Taboo 9 (1991)
  10. Taboo 10 (1992)
  11. Taboo 11 (1994)
  12. Taboo 12 (1994)
  13. Taboo 13 (1994)
  14. Taboo 14 (1995)
  15. Taboo 15 (1995)
  16. Taboo 16 (1996)
  17. Taboo 17 (1997)
  18. Taboo 18 (1998)
  19. Taboo 19 (1998)
  20. Taboo 2001: Sex Oddyseey (2002)
  21. Taboo 21 (2004)
  22. Taboo 22 (2006)
  23. Taboo 23 (2007)

== 24 ==
- Bulldog Drummond
  1. Bulldog Drummond (1923)
  2. Bulldog Drummond's Third Round (1925)
  3. Captain Swagger (1928)
  4. Bulldog Drummond (1929)
  5. Temple Tower (1930)
  6. The Return of Bulldog Drummond (1934)
  7. Bulldog Drummond Strikes Back (1934)
  8. Bulldog Jack (1935)
  9. Bulldog Drummond's Revenge (1937)
  10. Bulldog Drummond at Bay (1937)
  11. Bulldog Drummond Comes Back (1937)
  12. Bulldog Drummond Escapes (1937)
  13. Bulldog Drummond in Africa (1937)
  14. Bulldog Drummond's Peril (1937)
  15. Bulldog Drummond's Secret Police (1937)
  16. Arrest Bulldog Drummond (1937)
  17. Bulldog Drummond's Bride (1937)
  18. Bulldog Drummond Strikes Back(1947)
  19. Bulldog Drummond at Bay (1947)
  20. The Challenge (1948)
  21. 13 Lead Soldiers (1948)
  22. Calling Bulldog Drummond (1951)
  23. Deadlier Than the Male (1967)
  24. Some Girls Do (1967)
- The Lone Wolf *
  1. The Lone Wolf (1917)
  2. The False Faces (1919)
  3. The Lone Wolf's Daughter (1919)
  4. The Lone Wolf (1924)
  5. The Lone Wolf Returns (1926)
  6. Alias the Lone Wolf (1927)
  7. The Lone Wolf's Daughter (1929)
  8. Last of the Lone Wolf (1930)
  9. Cheaters at Play (1932)
  10. The Lone Wolf Returns (1935)
  11. The Lone Wolf in Paris (1938)
  12. The Lone Wolf Spy Hunt (1939)
  13. The Lone Wolf Strikes (1940)
  14. The Lone Wolf Meets a Lady (1940)
  15. The Lone Wolf Keeps a Date (1941)
  16. The Lone Wolf Takes A Chance (1941)
  17. Secrets of the Lone Wolf (1941)
  18. Counter-Espionage (1942)
  19. One Dangerous Night (1943)
  20. Passport to Suez (1943)
  21. The Notorious Lone Wolf (1946)
  22. The Lone Wolf in Mexico (1947)
  23. The Lone Wolf in London (1947)
  24. The Lone Wolf and His Lady (1949)
- Pokémon *** (a)
  1. Pokémon: The First Movie (1998)
  2. Pokémon: The Movie 2000 (1999)
  3. Pokémon 3: The Movie (2000)
  4. Pokémon 4Ever (2001)
  5. Pokémon Heroes (2002)
  6. Pokémon: Jirachi Wishmaker (2003)
  7. Pokémon: Destiny Deoxys (2004)
  8. Pokémon: Lucario and the Mystery of Mew (2005)
  9. Pokémon Ranger and the Temple of the Sea (2006)
  10. Pokémon: The Rise of Darkrai (2007)
  11. Pokémon: Giratina and the Sky Warrior (2008)
  12. Pokémon: Arceus and the Jewel of Life (2009)
  13. Pokémon: Zoroark: Master of Illusions (2010)
  14. Pokémon the Movie: Black - Victini and Reshiram (2011)
  15. Pokémon the Movie: White - Victini and Zekrom (2011)
  16. Pokémon the Movie: Kyurem vs. the Sword of Justice (2012)
  17. Pokémon the Movie: Genesect and the Legend Awakened (2013)
  18. Pokémon the Movie: Diancie and the Cocoon of Destruction (2014)
  19. Pokémon the Movie: Hoopa and the Clash of Ages (2015)
  20. Pokémon the Movie: Volcanion and the Mechanical Marvel (2016)
  21. Pokémon the Movie: I Choose You! (2017)
  22. Pokémon the Movie: The Power of Us (2018)
  23. Pokémon Detective Pikachu (2019)
  24. Pokémon the Movie: Secrets of the Jungle (2020)
- Range Busters
  1. The Range Busters (1940)
  2. Trailing Double Trouble (1940)
  3. West of Pinto Basin (1940)
  4. Trail of the Silver Spurs (1941)
  5. The Kid's Last Ride (1941)
  6. Tumbledown Ranch in Arizona (1941)
  7. Wrangler's Roost (1941)
  8. Fugitive Valley (1941)
  9. Saddle Mountain Roundup (1941)
  10. Tonto Basin Outlaws (1941)
  11. Underground Rustlers (1941)
  12. Thunder River Feud (1942)
  13. Rock River Renegades (1942)
  14. Boot Hill Bandits (1942)
  15. Texas Trouble Shooters (1942)
  16. Arizona Stage Coach (1942)
  17. Texas to Bataan (1942)
  18. Trail Riders (1942)
  19. Two Fisted Justice (1943)
  20. Haunted Ranch (1943)
  21. Land of Hunted Men (1943)
  22. Cowboy Commandos (1943)
  23. Black Market Rustlers (1943)
  24. Bullets and Saddles (1943)

== 25 ==
- James Bond
  1. Dr. No (1962)
  2. From Russia with Love (1963)
  3. Goldfinger (1964)
  4. Thunderball (1965)
  5. You Only Live Twice (1967)
  6. On Her Majesty's Secret Service (1969)
  7. Diamonds Are Forever (1971)
  8. Live and Let Die (1973)
  9. The Man with the Golden Gun (1974)
  10. The Spy Who Loved Me (1977)
  11. Moonraker (1979)
  12. For Your Eyes Only (1981)
  13. Octopussy (1983)
  14. A View to a Kill (1985)
  15. The Living Daylights (1987)
  16. Licence to Kill (1989)
  17. GoldenEye (1995)
  18. Tomorrow Never Dies (1997)
  19. The World Is Not Enough (1999)
  20. Die Another Day (2002)
  21. Casino Royale (2006)
  22. Quantum of Solace (2008)
  23. Skyfall (2012)
  24. Spectre (2015)
  25. No Time to Die (2021)
- Apartment Wife
  1. Apartment Wife: Affair In the Afternoon (1971)
  2. Apartment Wife: Secret Rendezvous (1972)
  3. Apartment Wife: Unforgettable Night (1972)
  4. Apartment Wife: Afternoon Bliss (1972)
  5. Apartment Wife: Prime Woman (1972)
  6. Apartment Wife: Night of the Rape (1973)
  7. Apartment Wife: Night of Pleasure (1973)
  8. Apartment Wife: Scent of a Woman (1973)
  9. Apartment Wife: Playing with Fire (1973)
  10. Apartment Wife: Afternoon Seduction (1974)
  11. New Apartment Wife: Afternoon Beast (1974)
  12. New Apartment Wife: Prostitution In Building #113 (1975)
  13. New Apartment Wife: Blue Film Woman (1973)
  14. New Apartment Wife: Swapping (1975)
  15. Apartment Wife: Flesh Financing (1976)
  16. Apartment Wife: Secret Call Girl (1976)
  17. Apartment Wife: Rainy Day Affair (1977)
  18. Apartment Wife: Violated Skin (1977)
  19. Apartment Wife: Night By Ourselves (1978)
  20. Apartment Wife: Target Bedroom (1979)
  21. Apartment Wife: Lust for an Orgasm (1979)
  22. Apartment Wife: Midday Adultery' (1997)
  23. New Apartment Wife: Adultery is the Taste of Honey (Only for Tonight) (1999)
  24. Apartment Wife: Adulterous Passion (2000)
  25. Apartment Wife: Moans from Next Door (2001)
- Maciste (1960-1965 series)
  1. Maciste nella valle dei re ( Maciste in the Valley of the Kings) (1960)
  2. Maciste nella terra dei ciclopi ( Maciste in the Land of the Cyclops) (1961)
  3. Maciste contro il vampiro (Maciste Vs. the Vampire) (1961)
  4. Il trionfo di Maciste (The Triumph of Maciste) (1961)
  5. Maciste alla corte del gran khan (Maciste at the Court of the Great Khan) (1961)
  6. Maciste, l'uomo più forte del mondo (Maciste, the Strongest Man in the World) (1961)
  7. Maciste contro Ercole nella valle dei guai (Maciste Against Hercules in the Vale of Woe) (1961)
  8. Totò contro Maciste (Totò vs Maciste) (1962)
  9. Maciste all'inferno (Maciste in Hell) (1962)
  10. Maciste contro lo sceicco (Maciste Vs. the Sheik) (1962)
  11. Maciste, il gladiatore più forte del mondo (Maciste, the World's Strongest Gladiator) (1962)
  12. Maciste contro i mostri (Maciste vs. the Monsters) (1962)
  13. Maciste contro i cacciatori di teste (Maciste Vs. the Headhunters) (1962)
  14. Maciste, l'eroe più grande del mondo (Maciste, the World's Greatest Hero) (1963)
  15. Zorro contro Maciste (Zorro Vs. Maciste) (1963)
  16. Maciste contro i mongoli (Maciste Vs. the Mongols) (1963)
  17. Maciste nell'inferno di Gengis Khan (Maciste in Genghis Khan's Hell) (1964)
  18. Maciste alla corte dello zar (Maciste at the Court of the Czar) (1964)
  19. Maciste, gladiatore di Sparta (Maciste, Gladiator of Sparta) ( 1964)
  20. Maciste nelle miniere de re salomone (Maciste in King Solomon's Mines) (1964)
  21. Maciste e la regina de Samar (Maciste and the Queen of Samar) (1964)
  22. La valle dell'eco tonante (Valley of the Thundering Echo) (1964) (aka Maciste and the Women of the Valley)
  23. Ercole, Sansone, Maciste e Ursus: gli invincibili (Hercules, Samson, Maciste and Ursus: The Invincibles) (1964)
  24. Gli invincibili fratelli Maciste (The Invincible Brothers Maciste) (1964)
  25. Maciste il Vendicatore dei Mayas (Maciste, Avenger of the Mayans) (1965)

== 26 ==
- Ring vs. Ju-On
  1. Ring (1995) (TV)
  2. Ring (1998)
  3. Spiral (1998)
  4. Ring 2 (1999) (retcon)
  5. The Ring Virus (1999) (remake)
  6. Ring 0: Birthday (2000) (prequel)
  7. Ju-On: The Curse (2000)
  8. Ju-On: The Curse 2 (2000)
  9. Ju-on: The Grudge (2002)
  10. The Ring (2002) (remake)
  11. Ju-on: The Grudge 2 (2003)
  12. The Grudge (2004) (remake)
  13. The Ring Two (2005) (remake)
  14. The Grudge 2 (2006) (remake)
  15. The Grudge 3 (2009) (V) (remake)
  16. Ju-On: Black Ghost (2009)
  17. Ju-On: White Ghost (2009)
  18. Sadako 3D (2012) (retcon)
  19. Sadako 3D 2 (2013) (retcon)
  20. Ju-On: The Beginning of the End (2014) (reboot)
  21. Ju-On: The Final Curse (2015) (reboot)
  22. Sadako vs. Kayako (2016) (crossover)
  23. Rings (2017) (remake)
  24. Sadako (2019) (retcon)
  25. The Grudge (2020) (remake)
  26. Sadako DX (2022) (retcon)
- Blue Demon
  1. Blue Demon (El Demonio Azul) (1964)
  2. Blue Demon contra el poder satánico (Blue Demon vs Satanic Power) (1964)
  3. Blue Demon en la sombra del murciélago (Blue Demon in "Shadow of The Bat") (1966)
  4. Blue Demon contra las aranas infernales (Blue Demon vs The Infernal Spiders) (1966)
  5. Blue Demon contra cerebros infernales (Blue Demon vs The Infernal Brains) (1966)
  6. Blue Demon contra las diabólicas (Blue Demon vs The Diabolical Women) (1966)
  7. Blue Demon destructor de espías (Blue Demon, Destroyer of Spies) (1967)
  8. Blue Demon en pasaporte à la muerte (Blue Demon in "Passport To Death") (1967)
  9. Blue Demon contra las invasoras (Blue Demon vs. The Women Invaders) (1968) (aka Blue Demon y las seductoras (Blue Demon and the Seductresses))
  10. Santo contra Blue Demon en la Atlántida (Santo vs Blue Demon in Atlantis) (1969)
  11. Santo el enmascarado de plata y Blue Demon contra los monstruos (Santo and Blue Demon vs The Monsters) (1969)
  12. Santo y Blue Demon en el mundo de los muertos (Santo & Blue Demon in "World of the Dead") (1969)
  13. Los campeones justicieros (The Champions of Justice) (1970)
  14. Las momias de Guanajuato (The Mummies of Guanajuato) (1970)
  15. Blue Demon y Zovek en "La invasión de los muertos" (Blue Demon & Zovek In "The Invasion of The Dead") (1971)
  16. La noche de la muerte (Blue Demon in "Night of Death") (1972)
  17. Blue Demon en la mafia amarilla (Blue Demon In "The Yellow Mafia") (1972)
  18. Vuelven los campeones justicieros (The Champions of Justice Return) (1972)
  19. Santo y Blue Demon contra Drácula y el Hombre Lobo (Santo & Blue Demon vs. Dracula & The Wolfman) (1972)
  20. Santo y Blue Demon en "Las bestias del terror" (Santo & Blue Demon in "The Beasts of Terror") (1972)
  21. El triunfo de los campeones justicieros (Triumph of The Champions of Justice) (1973)
  22. Santo y Blue Demon contra el doctor Frankenstein (Santo & Blue Demon vs Dr. Frankenstein) (1973)
  23. El hijo de Alma Grande (The Son of Alma Grande) (1974)
  24. La mansion de las siete momias (Mansion of The Seven Mummies) (1975)
  25. Misterio en las Bermudas (Mystery In Bermuda) (1977)
  26. Blue Demon, el campeón (Blue Demon, The Champion) (1989) (V)

== 27 ==
- Indiana Jones *
  1. Raiders of the Lost Ark (Chapter 24) (1981)
  2. Indiana Jones and the Temple of Doom (Chapter 23) (1984)
  3. Indiana Jones and the Last Crusade (Chapter 25) (1989)
  4. Mystery of the Blues (Chapter 20) (1993) (TV)
  5. Scandal of 1920 (Chapter 21) (1993) (TV)
  6. Phantom Train of Doom (Chapter 10) (1993) (TV)
  7. Hollywood Follies (Chapter 22) (1994) (TV)
  8. Treasure of the Peacock's Eye (Chapter 18) (1995) (TV)
  9. Attack of the Hawkmen (Chapter 12) (1995) (TV)
  10. Tales of Innocence (Chapter 16) (1999) (V)
  11. Spring Break Adventure (Chapter 6) (1999) (V)
  12. Trenches of Hell (Chapter 8) (1999) (V)
  13. Demons of Deception (Chapter 9) (1999) (V)
  14. Oganga, The Giver and Taker of Life (Chapter 11) (1999) (V)
  15. Adventures in the Secret Service (Chapter 13) (1999) (V)
  16. Daredevils of the Desert (Chapter 15) (1999) (V)
  17. Masks of Evil (Chapter 17) (1999) (V)
  18. My First Adventure (Chapter 1) (2000) (TV)
  19. Journey of Radiance (Chapter 5) (2000) (TV)
  20. Love's Sweet Song (Chapter 7) (2000) (TV)
  21. Passion for Life (Chapter 2) (2000) (TV)
  22. The Perils of Cupid (Chapter 3) (2000) (TV)
  23. Travels with Father (Chapter 4) (2007) (V)
  24. Espionage Escapades (Chapter 14) (2007) (V)
  25. Winds of Change (Chapter 19) (2008) (V)
  26. Indiana Jones and the Kingdom of the Crystal Skull (Chapter 26) (2008)
  27. Indiana Jones and the Dial of Destiny (Chapter 27) (2023)
- Maciste (Silent series)
  1. Cabiria (1914)
  2. Maciste (1915) (a.k.a. Marvelous Maciste, the Giant of Cabiria)
  3. Maciste bersagliere (Maciste the Ranger) (1916)
  4. Maciste alpino (Maciste the Warrior) (1916)
  5. Maciste atleta (Maciste the Athlete) (1917)
  6. Maciste medium (Maciste the Clairvoyant) (1917)
  7. Maciste poliziotto (Maciste the Detective) (1917)
  8. Maciste turista (Maciste the Tourist) (1917)
  9. Maciste sonnambulo (Maciste the Sleepwalker) (1918)
  10. Il Testamento di Maciste (Maciste's Last Will and Testament) (1919)
  11. Il Viaggio di Maciste (Maciste's Journey) (1919)
  12. Maciste I (Maciste the First) (1919)
  13. Maciste contro la morte (Maciste vs Death) (1919)
  14. Maciste innamorato (Maciste in Love) (1919)
  15. Maciste salvato dalle acque (Maciste, Rescued from the Waters) (1920)
  16. La Rivincita di Maciste (Maciste's Revenge (1921)
  17. Maciste in vacanza (Maciste on Vacation) (1921)
  18. Maciste e la figlia del re della Plata (Maciste and the Silver King's Daughter) (1922)
  19. Maciste und die Javanerin (Maciste and the Javanese) (1922)
  20. Maciste contro Maciste (Maciste Vs Maciste) (1923)
  21. Maciste und die chinesische Truhe (Maciste and the Chinese Chest) (1923)
  22. Maciste e il nipote di America (Maciste's American Nephew) (1924)
  23. Maciste imperatore (Emperor Maciste) (1924)
  24. Maciste contro lo sceicco (Maciste vs the Sheik) (1925)
  25. Maciste all'inferno (Maciste in Hell) (1925)
  26. Maciste nella gabbia dei leoni (Maciste in the Lion's Cage) (1926)
  27. Il gigante delle Dolomiti (The Giant of the Dolomites) (1927)

== 28 ==
- Blondie **
  1. Blondie (1938)
  2. Blondie Meets the Boss (1939)
  3. Blondie Takes a Vacation (1939)
  4. Blondie Brings Up Baby (1939)
  5. Blondie on a Budget (1940)
  6. Blondie Has Servant Trouble (1940)
  7. Blondie Plays Cupid (1940)
  8. Blondie Goes Latin (1941)
  9. Blondie in Society (1941)
  10. Blondie Goes to College (1942)
  11. Blondie's Blessed Event (1942)
  12. Blondie for Victory (1942)
  13. It's a Great Life (1943)
  14. Footlight Glamour (1943)
  15. Leave It to Blondie (1945)
  16. Life with Blondie (1945)
  17. Blondie's Lucky Day (1946)
  18. Blondie Knows Best (1946)
  19. Blondie's Big Moment (1947)
  20. Blondie's Holiday (1947)
  21. Blondie in the Dough (1947)
  22. Blondie's Anniversary (1947)
  23. Blondie's Reward (1948)
  24. Blondie's Secret (1948)
  25. Blondie's Big Deal (1949)
  26. Blondie Hits the Jackpot (1949)
  27. Blondie's Hero (1950)
  28. Beware of Blondie (1950)
- The Cisco Kid *
  1. The Caballero's Way (1914)
  2. The Border Terror (1919)
  3. In Old Arizona (1928)
  4. The Arizona Kid (1930)
  5. The Slippery Pearls (1931)
  6. The Cisco Kid (1931)
  7. Return of the Cisco Kid (1939)
  8. The Cisco Kid and the Lady (1939)
  9. Lucky Cisco Kid (1940)
  10. Viva Cisco Kid (1940)
  11. The Gay Caballero (1940)
  12. Romance of the Rio Grande (1941)
  13. Ride on Vaquero (1941)
  14. The Cisco Kid Returns (1945)
  15. The Cisco Kid In Old New Mexico (1945)
  16. South of the Rio Grande (1945)
  17. The Gay Cavalier (1946)
  18. South of Monterey (1946)
  19. Beauty and the Bandit (1946)
  20. Riding the California Trail (1947)
  21. Robin Hood of Monterey (1947)
  22. King of the Bandits (1947)
  23. The Valiant Hombre (1949)
  24. The Gay Amigo (1949)
  25. The Daring Caballero (1949)
  26. Satan's Cradle (1949)
  27. The Girl from San Lorenzo (1950)
  28. The Cisco Kid (1994) (TV)
- Maneater (TV)
  1. Blood Monkey (2007)
  2. Grizzly Rage (2007)
  3. In the Spider's Web (2007)
  4. Maneater (2007)
  5. Something Beneath (2007)
  6. Croc (2007)
  7. Eye of the Beast (2007)
  8. The Hive (2008)
  9. Black Swarm (2008)
  10. Hybrid (2008)
  11. Shark Swarm (2008)
  12. Vipers (2008)
  13. Swamp Devil (2008)
  14. Yeti (2008)
  15. Wyvern (2009)
  16. Sea Beast (2009)
  17. Carny (2009)
  18. Rise of the Gargoyles (2009)
  19. Malibu Shark Attack (2009)
  20. Sand Serpents (2009)
  21. Hellhounds (2009)
  22. High Plains Invaders (2009)
  23. Behemoth (2011)
  24. Ferocious Planet (2011)
  25. Roadkill (2011)
  26. Scarecrow (2013)
  27. Shark Killer (2015)
  28. The Hollow (2016)
- Red Ryder
  1. The Adventures of Red Ryder (1940)
  2. Tucson Raiders (1944)
  3. Marshal of Reno (1944)
  4. The San Antonio Kid (1944)
  5. Cheyenne Wildcat (1944)
  6. Vigilantes of Dodge City (1944)
  7. Sheriff of Las Vegas (1944)
  8. Great Stagecoach Robbery (1945)
  9. Lone Texas Ranger (1945)
  10. Phantom of the Plains (1945)
  11. Marshal of Laredo (1945)
  12. Colorado Pioneers (1945)
  13. Wagon Wheels Westward (1945)
  14. California Gold Rush (1946)
  15. Sheriff of Redwood Valley (1946)
  16. Sun Valley Cyclone (1946)
  17. Conquest of Cheyenne (1946)
  18. Santa Fe Uprising (1946)
  19. Stagecoach to Denver (1946)
  20. Vigilantes of Boomtown (1947)
  21. Homesteaders of Paradise Valley (1947)
  22. Oregon Trail Scouts (1947)
  23. Rustlers of Devil's Canyon (1947)
  24. Marshal of Cripple Creek (1947)
  25. Ride, Ryder, Ride! (1949)
  26. Roll, Thunder, Roll! (1949)
  27. The Fighting Redhead (1949)
  28. Cowboy and the Prizefighter (1949)
- Detective Conan * (A)
  1. The Time Bombed Skyscraper (1997)
  2. The Fourteenth Target (1998)
  3. The Last Wizard of the Century (1999)
  4. Captured in Her Eyes (2000)
  5. Countdown to Heaven (2001)
  6. The Phantom of Baker Street (2002)
  7. Crossroad in the Ancient Capital (2003)
  8. Magician of the Silver Sky (2004)
  9. Strategy Above the Depths (2005)
  10. The Private Eyes' Requiem (2006)
  11. Jolly Roger in the Deep Azure (2007)
  12. Full Score of Fear (2008)
  13. The Raven Chaser (2009)
  14. The Lost Ship in the Sky (2010)
  15. Quarter of Silence (2011)
  16. The Eleventh Striker (2012)
  17. Private Eye in the Distant Sea (2013)
  18. Dimensional Sniper (2014)
  19. Sunflowers of Inferno (2015)
  20. The Darkest Nightmare (2016)
  21. The Crimson Love Letter (2017)
  22. Zero the Enforcer (2018)
  23. The Fist of Blue Sapphire (2019)
  24. The Scarlet Bullet (2021)
  25. The Bride of Halloween (2022)
  26. Black Iron Submarine (2023)
  27. The Million Dollar Pentagram (2024)
  28. One-Eyed Flashback (2025)

== 29 ==
- Tarzan (1932–1970 series)
  1. Tarzan the Ape Man (1932)
  2. Tarzan and His Mate (1934)
  3. Tarzan Escapes (1936)
  4. Tarzan Finds a Son! (1939)
  5. Tarzan's Secret Treasure (1941)
  6. Tarzan's New York Adventure (1942)
  7. Tarzan Triumphs (1943)
  8. Tarzan's Desert Mystery (1943)
  9. Tarzan and the Amazons (1945)
  10. Tarzan and the Leopard Woman (1946)
  11. Tarzan and the Huntress (1947)
  12. Tarzan and the Mermaids (1948)
  13. Tarzan's Magic Fountain (1949)
  14. Tarzan and the Slave Girl (1950)
  15. Tarzan's Peril (1951)
  16. Tarzan's Savage Fury (1952)
  17. Tarzan and the She-Devil (1953)
  18. Tarzan's Hidden Jungle (1955)
  19. Tarzan and the Lost Safari (1957)
  20. Tarzan and the Trappers (1958)
  21. Tarzan's Fight for Life (1958)
  22. Tarzan's Greatest Adventure (1959)
  23. Tarzan the Magnificent (1960)
  24. Tarzan Goes to India (1962)
  25. Tarzan's Three Challenges (1963)
  26. Tarzan and the Valley of Gold (1966)
  27. Tarzan and the Great River (1967)
  28. Tarzan and the Jungle Boy (1968)
  29. Tarzan's Deadly Silence (1970) (TV)
- Zatoichi *
  1. Zatōichi monogatari (1962)
  2. Zoku Zatōichi monogatari (1962)
  3. Shin Zatōichi monogatari (1963)
  4. Zatōichi kyōjō-tabi (1963)
  5. Zatōichi kenka-tabi (1963)
  6. Zatōichi senryō-kubi (1964)
  7. Zatōichi abare tako (1964)
  8. Zatōichi kesshō-tabi (1964)
  9. Zatōichi sekisho-yaburi (1964)
  10. Zatōichi nidan-giri (1965)
  11. Zatōichi sakate-giri (1965)
  12. Zatōichi jigoku-tabi (1965)
  13. Zatōichi no uta ga kikoeru (1966)
  14. Zatōichi umi o wataru (1966)
  15. Zatōichi tekka-tabi (1967)
  16. Zatōichi rōyaburi (1967)
  17. Zatōichi chikemuri-kaidō (1967)
  18. Zatōichi hatashijō (1968)
  19. Zatōichi kenka-daiko (1968)
  20. Zatōichi to Yōjinbō (1970)
  21. Zatōichi abare-himatsuri (1970)
  22. Shin Zatōichi: Yabure! Tōjin-ken (1971)
  23. Zatōichi goyō-tabi (1972)
  24. Shin Zatōichi monogatari: Oreta tsue (1972)
  25. Shin Zatōichi monogatari: Kasama no chimatsuri (1973)
  26. Zatōichi (1989)
  27. Zatoichi (2003)
  28. Ichi (2008)
  29. Zatoichi: The Last (2010)
