= Maciste all'inferno =

Maciste all'inferno (Italian for "Maciste in Hell") may refer to:

- Maciste all'inferno (1925 film), an Italian film directed by Guido Brignone
- Maciste all'inferno (1962 film), a peplum-fantasy film directed by Riccardo Freda
- Maciste All'Inferno (album), an album by Gojira
