= The Sons of Hercules =

American television show

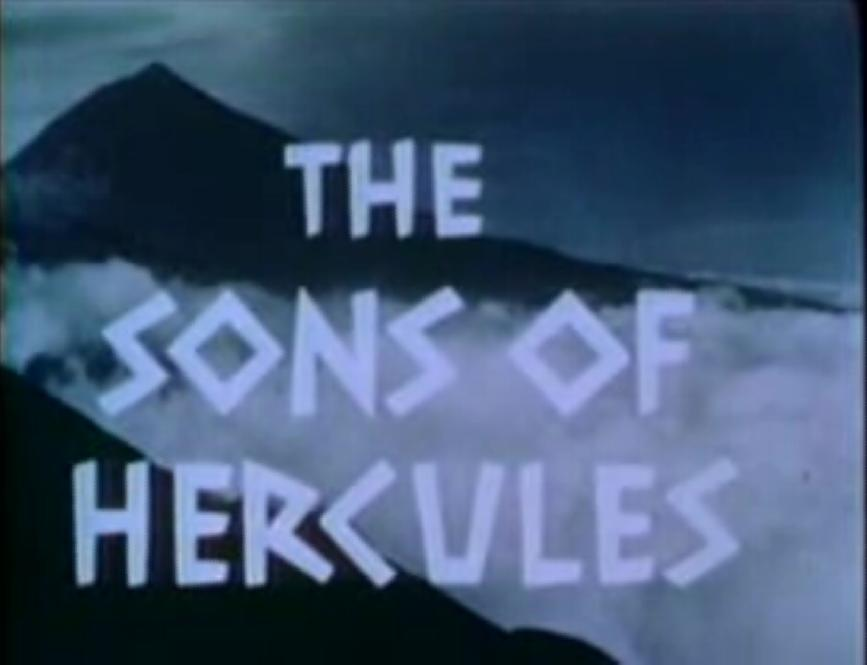
Title card for The Sons of Hercules series

The Sons of Hercules is a syndicated Embassy Pictures television show that aired in the United States in the 1960s. The series repackaged 13 Italian sword-and-sandal films by giving them a standardized theme song for the opening and closing titles, as well as a standard introductory narration attempting to relate the lead character in each film to the Greek demigod Hercules. These films however were not all originally made as "Hercules" films in Italy. Although two of them did originally feature Hercules (and not his sons), four of the films were originally Maciste movies in Italy, and the others were just isolated gladiator or mythological hero movies not released theatrically in the US.

The films were also offered in a package of 26 one-hour episodes, breaking each film into two parts, which allowed them to be shown in a weekly one-hour time slot.

== Films in the series ==
There were thirteen films in the Sons of Hercules syndication package.

The first title listed for each film is its American television title, followed by the translated original Italian title in parentheses.

- Mole Men vs the Son of Hercules (Maciste, the Strongest Man in the World) 1961, starring Mark Forest
- Triumph of the Son of Hercules (The Triumph of Maciste) 1961, starring Kirk Morris
- Fire Monsters Against the Son of Hercules (Maciste vs the Monsters) 1962, starring Reg Lewis
- Venus Against the Son of Hercules (Mars, God of War) 1962, starring Roger Browne
- Ulysses Against the Son of Hercules (Ulysses Against Hercules) 1962, starring Mike Lane
- Medusa Against the Son of Hercules (Perseus the Invincible) 1962, starring Richard Harrison
- Son of Hercules in the Land of Fire (Ursus in the Land of Fire) 1963, starring Ed Fury
- Tyrant of Lydia Against the Son of Hercules (Goliath and the Rebel Slave) 1963, starring Gordon Scott
- Messalina Against the Son of Hercules (The Last Gladiator) 1963, starring Richard Harrison
- The Beast of Babylon Against the Son of Hercules (Hero of Babylon) 1963, a.k.a. Goliath, King of the Slaves, starring Gordon Scott
- Terror of Rome Against the Son of Hercules (Maciste, Gladiator of Sparta) 1964, starring Mark Forest
- Son of Hercules in the Land of Darkness (Hercules the Invincible) 1964, starring Dan Vadis
- Devil of the Desert Against the Son of Hercules (Anthar the Invincible) 1964, (a.k.a. The Slave Merchants, a.k.a. Soraya, Queen of the Desert) starring Kirk Morris, directed by Antonio Margheriti

== See also ==
- Samson
- Steve Reeves
- Sword-and-sandal
