= Demeter Bitenc =

Slovenian actor (1922–2018)

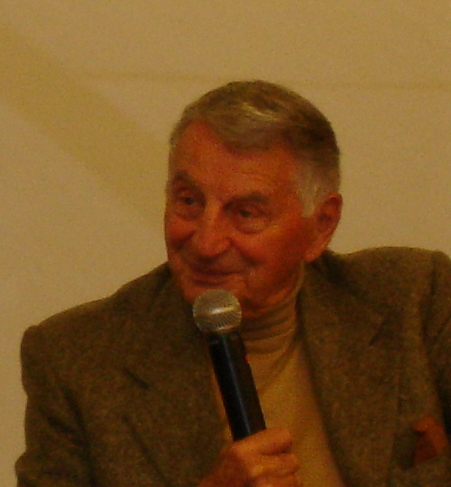
- Born: 21 July 1922; Ljubljana, Kingdom of Serbs, Croats and Slovenes
- Died: 22 April 2018 (aged 95); Ljubljana, Slovenia
- Occupation: Actor
- Years active: 1953–2018

Demeter Bitenc (21 July 1922 – 22 April 2018) was a Slovenian film actor. He appeared in more than 150 films and television shows from 1953 to 2018. He was born in Ljubljana, Slovenia.

== Selected filmography ==
- Sinji galeb (1953)
- Pulverschnee nach Übersee (1956) - John Meredith (uncredited)
- Dobri stari pianino (1959) - Nemski oficir
- Akcija (1960) - Gestapovec
- Flitterwochen in der Hölle (1960) - José Antonio García
- Island of the Amazons (1960) - Leblanc
- The Girl with the Narrow Hips (1961) - Stefan
- Dancing in the Rain (1961) - Profesor
- The Festival Girls (1961) - Member of Jury
- Treibjagd auf ein Leben (1961) - Coco
- Fire Monsters Against the Son of Hercules (1962) - Dorok - Father of Aydar
- Minuta za umor (1962)
- The Triumph of Robin Hood (1962) - Sigmund (uncredited)
- Il bandito della luce rossa (1962)
- Colossus and the Headhunters (1963) - Ariel
- The Saracens (1963) - Rabaneck
- Das Rätsel der roten Quaste (1963) - Mantel
- Apache Gold (1963) - Dick Stone
- Shadow of Treason (1963)
- Ring of Spies (1964) - (uncredited)
- Holiday in St. Tropez (1964) - Fred
- Das Haus auf dem Hügel (1964)
- Heiss weht der Wind (1964)
- The Crooked Road (1965)
- Fire Over Rome (1965) - Menecrate
- The Bandits of the Rio Grande (1965) - Elgaut
- Maciste, the Avenger of the Mayans (1965) - Gruno
- Duel at Sundown (1965) - Mack
- Amandus (1966) - Second ostler
- The Seventh Continent (1966) - Otec bílého chlapce
- Missione apocalisse (1966) - Croupier (uncredited)
- Star Black (1966) - Burt
- Target for Killing (1966) - Cloy - ein Killer
- Ballad of a Gunman (1967) - Bradley (uncredited)
- Grajski biki (1967)
- Come rubare un quintale di diamanti in Russia (1967) - Stark (uncredited)
- Fast ein Held (1967) - Monsieur Le Baron
- Nevidni bataljon (1967) - Lieutenant
- Dobar vetar 'Plava ptico' (1967)
- Soncni krik (1968) - Detektiv
- Peta zaseda (1968) - major Viktor
- Operation Cross Eagles (1968) - Bell
- La porta del cannone (1969)
- The Bridge (1969) - Nimayer
- Battle of Neretva (1969) - Schröder
- The Ravine (1969) - Lietenant Eisgruber
- Poppea's Hot Nights (1969) - Tigellinus
- The Fifth Day of Peace (1970) - Maggiore Brandt
- Riuscirà il nostro eroe a ritrovare il più grande diamante del mondo? (1971) - Kruger (uncredited)
- Devetnaest djevojaka i jedan mornar (1971) - Njemacki kapetan
- Walter Defends Sarajevo (1972) - Pukovnik Wansdorf
- Begunec (1973) - Agent
- England Made Me (1973) - Reichsminister
- Battle of Sutjeska (1973) - Clan engleske vojne misije
- Mirko i Slavko (1973) - Nemacki komandant
- Pastirci (1973) - Sharpener
- Pomladni veter (1974)
- 141 perc a befejezetlen mondatból (1975)
- Crvena zemlja (1975) - Obersturmführer
- Med strahom in dolznostjo (1975)
- Private Vices, Public Pleasures (1976)
- Attempted Flight (1976) - Miro (uncredited)
- Cross of Iron (1977) - Capt. Pucher (uncredited)
- Real Pests (1977) - Brinovec
- Dark Echoes (1977) - Woodcutter
- Mannen i skuggan (1978) - Berg
- Draga moja Iza (1979) - Josip Heisinger
- Partizanska eskadrila (1979) - German Colonel
- Iskanja (1979) - Hotelir
- Lyubov i yarost (1979)
- Prestop (1980) - Sekretar
- The Secret of Nikola Tesla (1980)
- See You in the Next War (1980) - Partizanski oficir
- High Voltage (1981) - Prodavac skica za generator
- Pustota (1982)
- The Smell of Quinces (1982) - Adjutant
- Eva (1983) - Projektant
- Dih (1983) - Berglez
- Od petka do petka (1985)
- Ada (1985) - Stipanic
- Nas clovek (1985)
- Doktor (1985)
- The War Boy (1985) - Arrow Cross officer
- Tempi di guerra (1987)
- Zivela svoboda! (1987) - Zupan
- Destroying Angel (1987) - Taxi driver
- War and Remembrance (1988, TV Mini Series)
- Kavarna Astoria (1989) - Medenik
- Donator (1989) - Pukovnik Leibnitz
- Decembrski dez (1990)
- Captain America (1990) - Industrialist #1
- The Pope Must Die (1991) - Raggio
- Outsider (1997) - Headmaster
- Irrlichter (1997) - Dr. Herzog
- Stereotip (1997) - Smiljan Lehpamer
- Oda Presernu (2001) - Profesor
- Pozabljeni zaklad (2002) - Zupnik
- Deseta zapoved (2003) - Frenk
- Dergi in Roza v kraljestvu svizca (2004)
- Delo osvobaja (2004) - The Neighbour
- Long Dark Night (2005, TV Series)
- Dobro ustimani mrtvaci (2005) - Uros
- Gravehopping (2005) - Starec
- Ljubljana je ljubljena (2005) - Sef Vic
- Vztrajanje (2017) - Husband
- Milice 2 (2017) - German guest (final film role)
