= Maciste, the Avenger of the Mayans =

- Directed by: Guido Malatesta
- Screenplay by: Guido Malatesta
- Starring: Kirk Morris; Barbara Loy; Andrea Aureli; Demeter Bitenc
- Cinematography: Romolo Garroni
- Edited by: Enzo Alfonzi
- Music by: Ugo Filippini
- Production company: Urias Films
- Distributed by: Variety Distribution
- Release date: 26 May 1965 (Italy)
- Running time: 85 minutes
- Country: Italy

Maciste, the Avenger of the Mayans (Italian: Maciste il vendicatore dei Maya) is a 1965 Italian film directed by Guido Malatesta.

== Cast ==
- Kirk Morris ... Ercole
- Barbara Loy ... Aloha
- Andrea Aureli ... Manur
- Demeter Bitenc ... Gruno
- Lucia Bomez
- Mimmo Maggio
- Rita Klein
- Luciana Paoli
- Luciano Marin ... Donar
- Antonio Casale ... Berak
- Koloss ... Goliath
- Nando Angelini

== Production ==
Maciste, the Avenger of the Mayans combines footage from two previous films: Fire Monsters Against the Son of Hercules and Colossus and the Headhunters.

== Release ==
Maciste, the Avengers of the Mayans was released as Maciste il vendicatore dei Maya in Italy on 26 May 1965.

== See also ==
- List of Italian films of 1965
