= Maciste =

Character in Italian cinema

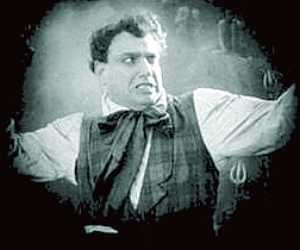
Bartolomeo Pagano as Maciste

Maciste (Italian pronunciation: [maˈtʃiste]) is one of the oldest recurring characters of cinema, created by Gabriele d'Annunzio and Giovanni Pastrone. He is featured throughout the history of the cinema of Italy from the 1910s to the mid-1960s.

He is usually depicted as a Hercules-like figure, utilizing his massive strength to achieve heroic feats that ordinary men cannot. Many of the 1960s Italian movies featuring Maciste were retitled in other countries, substituting more popular names in the titles (such as Hercules, Goliath or Samson).

== Name origin ==
There are a number of references to the name in literature. The name of Maciste appears in a sentence in Strabo's Geographica (Book 8, Chapter 3, Section 21), in which he writes: ἐν δὲ τῷ μεταξὺ τό τε τοῦ Μακιστίου Ἡρακλέους ἱερόν ἐστι καὶ ὁ Ἀκίδων ποταμός – "And in the middle is the temple of the Macistian Heracles, and the river Acidon." The epithet Μακίστιος (Makistios, Latinized as Macistius) is generally understood to be an adjective referring to a town called Μάκιστος (Makistos) in the province of Triphylia in Elis. In the first volume of the Dizionario universale archeologico-artistico-tecnologico (1858) Macistius is given as one among several epithets of Hercules (Ercole). In the second volume of the same dictionary (1864) this name appears Italianized as Maciste, defined as uno dei soprannomi d'Ercole ("one of the nicknames of Hercules"). According to William Smith's A Dictionary of Greek and Roman mythology, Macistus (Μάκιστος) was "a surname of Heracles, who had a temple in the neighbourhood of the town of Macistus in Triphylia". Makistos was also the third child of Athamas and Nephele, according to the Greek mythology.

In the original draft outline of the 1914 movie Cabiria by director Giovanni Pastrone, the muscular hero's name had been Ercole ("Hercules"). In the revised script, writer Gabriele d'Annunzio gave the character the name Maciste, which he understood (based on the above or similar sources) to be an erudite synonym for Hercules.

While subsequent screenwriters started using the same character for new movie plots, the original etymology of the name was generally forgotten, and a new folk etymology was constructed based on the name's superficial similarity to the Italian word macigno, which means "large stone"; in the first of the 1960s films, Maciste tells another character in the film that his name means "born of the rock", and in a later film, Maciste is actually shown in one scene appearing from within a solid rock wall in a cave, as if by magic.

In the book Italian Cinema: Gender and Genre, the Serena Professor of Italian Maggie Günsberg claims that Gabriele d'Annunzio used two sources: one from ancient Greek, makistos, meaning "longer" (although the Doric Greek μάκιστος actually means "greatest", "tallest", or "longest in time"), and the second from a supposed Latin word, macis, meaning "rock". Still, no such word as macis exists in Latin. The Italian word macigno ultimately derives from Latin machina, which is commonly used in the sense of "millstone".

== Cabiria ==
Maciste made his debut in the 1914 Italian silent movie classic Cabiria. Cabiria is a story about a slave named Maciste (played by Bartolomeo Pagano) who was involved in the rescue of a Roman girl named Cabiria (played by Lidia Quaranta) from an evil Carthaginian priest who plotted to sacrifice her to the cruel god Moloch. The film was based very loosely on Salammbo, a historical novel by Gustave Flaubert, and had a plot and screenplay by Gabriele d'Annunzio.

Maciste's debut set the tone for his later adventures. Including Cabiria itself, there have been at least 52 movies featuring Maciste, 27 of them being pre-1927 silent films starring Bartolomeo Pagano and the other 25 being a series of sound and color films produced in the early 1960s. Typical plots involve tyrannical rulers who practice vile magical rituals or worship evil gods. Typically, the young woman who is the love interest runs afoul of the evil ruler. Maciste, who possesses superhuman strength, must rescue her. There is often a rightful king who wants to overthrow the evil usurper, as well as a belly dance scene. There is often an evil queen who has carnal designs on the hero. These films were set in locales including Mongolia, Peru, Egypt, and the Roman Empire.

== Bartolomeo Pagano's Maciste films ==
Original trade ad for the first of the Maciste silent film series

As a character, Maciste had two distinct moments in the spotlight. The first was in the Italian silent movie period, in which the original Maciste from Cabiria, the muscular actor Bartolomeo Pagano, starred in a series of at least 26 sequels over the period from 1915 through 1926. Then decades later, (following on the heels of the success of the two 1950s Steve Reeves "Hercules" films) Maciste was revived by Italian filmmakers for a series of 25 sound films (all made between 1960 and 1965).

The Bartolomeo Pagano silent Maciste films established the character as someone who could appear at any place and at any time. Some of the earlier ones, made during World War I, had the distinct flavour of propaganda, and cast the hero in the role of a soldier. Later films in the series return to fantasy, but the fantasy was not always mythological. Maciste appears as an Olympic athlete, in contemporary settings, or in the afterlife. His character and his plots remained consistent in whatever setting; he was always a populist Hercules, using his physical prowess to overcome the evil ruses of effete aristocrats and authority figures.

Bodybuilder Mark Forest played Maciste in the 1961 film Maciste, the Strongest Man in the World

== Revival of the 1960s ==
The character was revived in the 1960s. In 1957, Steve Reeves' Hercules, an Italian production, created a minor boom in Italian dramas featuring American bodybuilders in vaguely mythological or classical historical subjects. Maciste was the hero in 25 of these films. Other films starred such heroes as Ursus, Samson, Hercules and Goliath.

Maciste was never given an origin, and the source of his mighty powers was never revealed, nor was he confined to one specific time period or setting in his adventures. However, in the first of the 1960s Maciste films, he mentions to another character that the name "Maciste" means "born of the rock" (almost as if he was a god who would just appear out of the earth in times of need). One of the 1920s silent Maciste films was actually entitled "The Giant from the Dolomite" (another reference that he was not born as an ordinary mortal man would have been). Hence it is hinted that Maciste is more god than man, which would explain his great strength.

This sword and sandal fad continued for about six years, until the new fad for spaghetti Westerns and spy films took over the attention of the Italian cinema industry. The name Maciste was not in the title of the English versions of most of these films: when the films were imported into the US and dubbed in English, the hero's name was often changed to Hercules, Samson, Goliath, Atlas, Ulysses, Colossus, or Majestus, because the name Maciste was not widely recognised in the USA. Some Italian sword and sandal films were not theatrically released in the USA; rather they premiered on American television in a syndication package called The Sons of Hercules, usually broadcast on Saturday afternoons. Best remembered for its stirring theme song, films originally featuring Maciste were dubbed into a variety of different "Sons of Hercules" pictures, with stock narration at the opening attempting to tie the film's lead character in to Hercules any way they could. A number of Italian musclemen played Maciste in the 1960s films, but Mark Forest was the actor who played Maciste the most (7 times). The other actors included Gordon Scott, Reg Park, Gordon Mitchell, Reg Lewis, Kirk Morris, Samson Burke, Alan Steel, Richard Lloyd, Renato Rossini and Frank Gordon.

== Influence ==
- The Cabiria scene in which Maciste pushes a mill wheel for ten years may have inspired John Milius, who shot a similar one for his movie Conan the Barbarian (1982).
- Federico Fellini said that Maciste all'inferno (1925) was the first movie he remembered seeing as a child. His 1954 film La Strada features a brutish strongman performer.
- The 1960s adventures have been enjoyed mostly by devotees of camp style. Two of the films, Maciste contro i cacciatori di teste (translated as Colossus and the Headhunters) and Maciste e la regina di Samar (as Hercules Against the Moon Men) appeared on the comedy television program Mystery Science Theater 3000 in the 1990s. In Colossus and the Headhunters, the pronunciation of Maciste's name was frequently mocked as "my cheesesteak."
- The Belgian strongman John Massis based his pseudonym on Maciste.
- The 2006 film The Caiman features an Italian exploitation film producer who made the film Machiste Against Freud.
- In the 2013 film Il Futuro Rutger Hauer plays a retired actor and bodybuilder nicknamed "Machiste" for having starred in the role in the 1960s. The film is based on Roberto Bolaño's A Little Lumpen Novelita, featuring the character.

== Filmography ==
=== The silent film series (in chronological order) ===
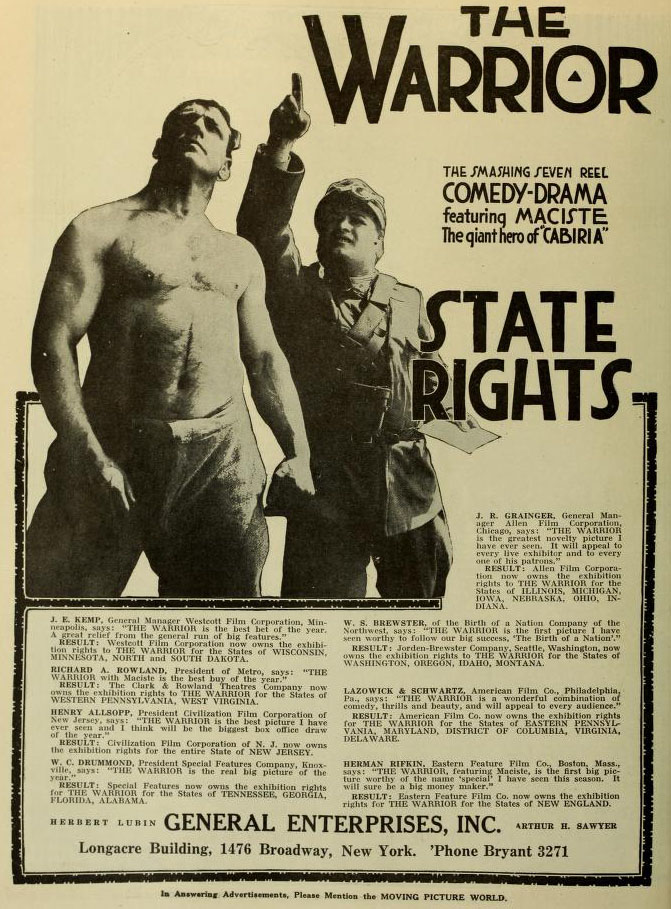
Maciste alpino (1916) aka "Maciste The Warrior"

- Cabiria (1914) introduced the Maciste character
- Maciste (1915) aka "Marvelous Maciste, the Giant of Cabiria"
- Maciste bersagliere ("Maciste the Ranger", 1916)
- Maciste alpino (1916) aka "Maciste The Warrior"
- Maciste atleta ("Maciste the Athlete", 1917)
- Maciste medium ("Maciste the Clairvoyant", 1917)
- Maciste poliziotto ("Maciste the Detective", 1917)
- Maciste turista ("Maciste the Tourist", 1917)
- Maciste sonnambulo ("Maciste the Sleepwalker", 1918)
- Il Testamento di Maciste ("Maciste's Last Will and Testament", 1919)
- Il Viaggio di Maciste ("Maciste's Journey", 1919)
- Maciste I ("Maciste the First", 1919)
- Maciste contro la morte ("Maciste vs Death", 1919)
- Maciste innamorato ("Maciste in Love", 1919)
- Maciste salvato dalle acque ("Maciste, Rescued from the Waters", 1920)
- La Rivincita di Maciste ("The Revenge of Maciste", 1921)
- Maciste in vacanza ("Maciste on Vacation", 1921)
- Maciste e la figlia del re della Plata ("Maciste and the Silver King's Daughter", 1922)
- Maciste und die Javanerin ("Maciste and the Javanese", 1922)
- Maciste contro Maciste ("Maciste vs Maciste", 1923)
- Maciste und die chinesische truhe ("Maciste and the Chinese Chest", 1923)
- Maciste e il nipote di America ("Maciste's American Nephew", 1924)
- Maciste imperatore ("Emperor Maciste", 1924)
- Maciste contro lo sceicco ("Maciste vs the Sheik", 1925)
- Maciste all'inferno ("Maciste in Hell", 1925)
- Maciste nella gabbia dei leoni ("Maciste in the Lion's Cage", 1926)
- il gigante delle dolomiti ("The Giant of the Dolomites", 1927)

=== The 1960s film series (in chronological order) ===
There were a total of 25 Maciste films from the 1960s peplum craze. By 1960, seeing how well the two Steve Reeves Hercules films were doing at the box office, Italian producers decided to revive the 1920s silent film character Maciste in a new series of color and sound films. Unlike the other Italian peplum protagonists, Maciste appeared in a variety of time periods ranging from the Ice Age to 16th Century Scotland. Maciste was never given an origin, and the source of his mighty powers was never revealed. However, in the first film of the 1960s series, he mentions to another character that the name "Maciste" means "born of the rock", as if he were a god who would appear out of the earth itself in times of need. One of the 1920s silent Maciste films was entitled "The Giant from the Dolomite", suggesting that Maciste may be more god than man, which would explain his great strength.

The first title listed for each film is the film's original Italian title along with its English translation, while the U.S. release title follows in bold type in parentheses (Maciste's name in the Italian title is usually altered to an entirely different name in the American title):

- Maciste nella valle dei re / Maciste in the Valley of the Kings (**Son of Samson**, 1960) a.k.a. Maciste the Mighty, aka Maciste the Giant, starring Mark Forest & Chelo Alonso
- Maciste nella terra dei ciclopi / Maciste in the Land of the Cyclops (**Atlas in the Land of the Cyclops**, 1961) starring Gordon Mitchell & Chelo Alonso
- Maciste contro il vampiro / Maciste Vs. the Vampire (**Goliath and the Vampires**, 1961) starring Gordon Scott
- Il trionfo di Maciste / The Triumph of Maciste (**Triumph of the Son of Hercules**, 1961) starring Kirk Morris
- Maciste alla corte del gran khan / Maciste at the Court of the Great Khan (**Samson and the Seven Miracles of the World**, 1961) starring Gordon Scott
- Maciste, l'uomo più forte del mondo / Maciste, the Strongest Man in the World (**Mole Men vs the Son of Hercules**, 1961) starring Mark Forest
- Maciste contro Ercole nella valle dei guai / Maciste Against Hercules in the Vale of Woe (**Hercules in the Vale of Woe**, 1961) starring Kirk Morris as Maciste
- Totò contro Maciste / Toto vs. Maciste (No American title, 1962) starring Samson Burke; this was a comedy satirizing the peplum genre (part of the Italian "Toto" film series) and was never distributed in the USA; it is apparently not available in English
- Maciste all'inferno / Maciste in Hell (**The Witch's Curse**, 1962) starring Kirk Morris
- Maciste contro lo sceicco / Maciste Against the Sheik (**Samson Against the Sheik**, 1962) starring Ed Fury
- Maciste, il gladiatore più forte del mondo / Maciste, the World's Strongest Gladiator (**Colossus of the Arena**, 1962) starring Mark Forest
- Maciste contro i mostri / Maciste Against the Monsters (**Fire Monsters Against the Son of Hercules**, 1962) starring Reg Lewis
- Maciste contro i cacciatori di teste / Maciste Against the Headhunters (**Colossus and the Headhunters**, 1962) starring Kirk Morris
- Maciste, l'eroe più grande del mondo / Maciste, the World's Greatest Hero (**Goliath and the Sins of Babylon**, 1963) starring Mark Forest
- Zorro contro Maciste / Zorro Against Maciste (**Samson and the Slave Queen**, 1963) starring Alan Steel
- Maciste contro i mongoli / Maciste Against the Mongols (**Hercules Against the Mongols**, 1963) starring Mark Forest
- Maciste nell'inferno di Gengis Khan / Maciste in Genghis Khan's Hell (**Hercules Against the Barbarians**, 1963) starring Mark Forest
- Maciste alla corte dello zar / Maciste at the Court of the Czar (**Atlas Against The Czar**, 1964) starring Kirk Morris (a.k.a. Samson vs. the Giant King)
- Maciste, gladiatore di Sparta / Maciste, Gladiator of Sparta (**The Terror of Rome Against the Son of Hercules**, 1964) starring Mark Forest
- Maciste nelle miniere de re salomone / Maciste in King Solomon's Mines (**Samson in King Solomon's Mines**, 1964) starring Reg Park
- Maciste e la regina de Samar / Maciste and the Queen of Samar (**Hercules Against the Moon Men**, 1964) starring Alan Steel
- La valle dell'eco tonante / Valley of the Thundering Echo (**Hercules of the Desert**, 1964) starring Kirk Morris, a.k.a. Desert Raiders, a.k.a. in France as Maciste and the Women of the Valley
- Ercole, Sansone, Maciste e Ursus: gli invincibili / Hercules, Samson, Maciste and Ursus: The Invincibles (**Samson and His Mighty Challenge**, 1964) starring Renato Rossini as Maciste (a.k.a. Combate dei Gigantes or Le Grand Defi)
- Gli invincibili fratelli Maciste / The Invincible Maciste Brothers (**The Invincible Brothers Maciste**, 1964) a.k.a. The Invincible Gladiators, starring Richard Lloyd as Maciste
- Maciste il Vendicatore dei Mayas / Maciste, Avenger of the Mayans (has no American title, 1965) (This Maciste film was made up almost entirely of re-edited stock footage from two older Maciste films, Maciste contro i mostri and Maciste contro i cacciatori di teste, so Maciste switches from Kirk Morris to Reg Lewis in various scenes; this movie is very scarce since it was never distributed in the US and is not available in English.)

=== The 1973 films of Jesús Franco ===
In 1973, the Spanish cult film director Jesús Franco directed two low-budget "Maciste" films for French producers: Maciste contre la Reine des Amazones (Maciste vs the Queen of the Amazons) and Les exploits érotiques de Maciste dans l'Atlantide (The Erotic Exploits of Maciste in Atlantis), both starring Wal Davis as Maciste. The films have almost identical casts and appear to have been shot back-to-back. Despite their titles, the plots were totally unrelated to the 1960s Italian Maciste series. In the Franco films Maciste was presented as a 16th-century French adventurer who travels overseas to exotic lands.

Maciste contre la Reine des Amazones was distributed in Italy as a "Karzan" film (a Tarzan imitation), while Les exploits érotiques de Maciste dans l'Atlantide was released, also in France, in a second version with hardcore pornographic inserts entitled Les Gloutonnes (literally: "The Gobblers").

== See also ==
- Sword and Sandal
- Samson
- Hercules
- The Sons of Hercules
- Steve Reeves
