= Revolt of the Barbarians =

- Directed by: Guido Malatesta
- Produced by: Pier Luigi Torri; Protor Film
- Starring: See below
- Music by: Carlo Franci
- Release date: 18 December 1964
- Running time: 99 minutes (US); 80 minutes (Italy)
- Country: Italy
- Language: Italian

Revolt of the Barbarians (Italian: La rivolta dei barbari) is a 1964 Italian film directed by Guido Malatesta.

== Plot ==
After several years abroad fighting numerous campaigns in Gaul, Darius, commander of the 10th Legion, is finally able to return to Rome with his men. After discovering an ambushed Roman convoy and shortly meeting First Proconsul Claudius, Darius learns of a theft made on the convoy with gold intended to pay Roman legionnaires for their service. Darius then must track down the thieves and recover the gold before he is allowed to return home with his legion.

== Cast ==
- Roland Carey as Darius
- Maria Grazia Spina as Lydia
- Mario Feliciani
- Gabriele Antonini as Domitius
- Andrea Aureli
- Susan Sullivan
- Gaetano Scala
- Franco Beltramme
- Gilberto Galimberti
