= Samoa, Queen of the Jungle =

- Directed by: Guido Malatesta
- Produced by: Fortunato Misiano
- Cinematography: Augusto Tiezzi
- Music by: Angelo Francesco Lavagnino
- Release date: 1968
- Country: Italy
- Language: Italian

Samoa, Queen of the Jungle (Italian: Samoa, regina della giungla) is a 1968 Italian adventure film directed by Guido Malatesta.

== Cast ==
- Roger Browne as Clint Lomas
- Edwige Fenech as Samoa
- Ivy Holzer as Nancy White
- Ivano Staccioli as Moreau
- Andrea Aureli as Stark
- Umberto Ceriani as Alain
- Tullio Altamura as Professor Dawson
- Wilbert Bradley as Campu
- Femi Benussi as Yasmin
