= Tarzana, the Wild Girl =

- American theatrical poster
- Directed by: Guido Malatesta
- Written by: Gianfranco Clerici; Guido Malatesta
- Produced by: Fortunato Misiano
- Starring: Femi Benussi
- Cinematography: Augusto Tiezzi
- Edited by: Jolanda Benvenuti
- Music by: Angelo Francesco Lavagnino
- Release date: 1969
- Country: Italy
- Language: Italian

Tarzana, the Wild Girl (Italian: Tarzana, sesso selvaggio) is a 1969 Italian adventure film written and directed by Guido Malatesta (using the pseudonym James Reed).

== Plot ==
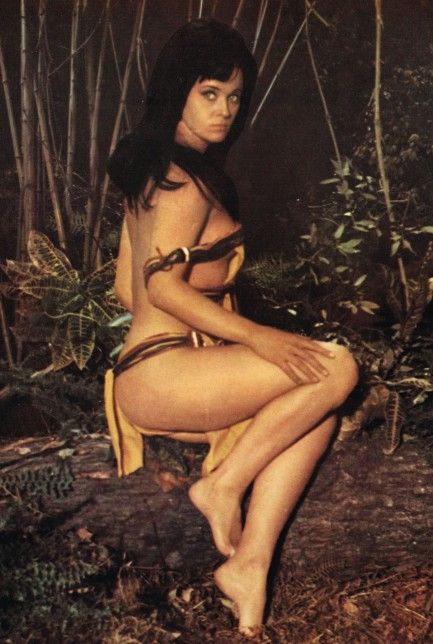
Style of Benussi as Tarzana

When reports arrive in Europe that a Kenyan tribe has elected a white woman as their queen, Tarzana (meaning 'strange woman' in Bantu), Sir Donovan is certain that the woman is his long-lost granddaughter Elizabeth, who was thought to have died along with her parents following a plane crash in the African jungle. Wanting his granddaughter to inherit his assets, Sir Donovan recruits a hunter named Glen Shipper (and his romantic interest Doris) to journey into Africa to seek out Tarzana and return Elizabeth to civilization. This particularly places Tarzana in the danger of her own cousin Groder, who has accompanied Glen and Doris on their quest in the hopes of exterminating Elizabeth in order to become Sir Donovan's next heir.

== Cast ==
- Femi Benussi as Tarzana / Elizabeth
- Ken Clark as Glen Shipper
- Franca Polesello as Doris
- Beryl Cunningham as Kamala
- Franco Ressel as Groder
- Raf Baldassarre as Fred
- Andrea Aureli

== See also ==
- Jungle girl - the general type of character
