= Poppea's Hot Nights =

- Directed by: Guido Malatesta
- Written by: Gianfranco Clerici; Guido Malatesta
- Produced by: Fortunato Misiano
- Starring: Olinka Berova; Brad Harris
- Cinematography: Augusto Tiezzi
- Music by: Angelo Francesco Lavagnino
- Production company: Romana Film
- Release date: 1969
- Country: Italy
- Language: Italian

Poppea's Hot Nights (Italian: Le calde notti di Poppea) is a 1969 Italian comedy film set in Ancient Rome. It was written and directed by Guido Malatesta and stars Olga Schoberová (credited as Olinka Berova) and Brad Harris in the main roles.

== Cast ==
- Olinka Berova as Poppaea Sabina
- Brad Harris as Claudius Valerius
- Gia Sandri as Lucretia
- Howard Ross as Marco
- Femi Benussi as Livia
- Sandro Dori as Nero
- Daniele Vargas as Druso
- Carla Calò as Calpurnia
- Nello Pazzafini as Father Colonnius
- Tullio Altamura as Seneca the Younger
- Silvio Bagolini as Maestro Lepido
- Elisa Mainardi as Dionisia
- Ignazio Balsamo as Tarquinio
- Demeter Bitenc as Tigellino
- Franco Pasquetto as Leander
- Fortunato Arena as the Legionary
- Marco Tulli as the Priest
- Alberto Sorrentino as the Roman waiting for Drusilla
