= Five Dolls for an August Moon =

1970 film directed by Mario Bava

- Theatrical release poster
- Italian: 5 bambole per la luna d'agosto
- Directed by: Mario Bava
- Written by: Mario di Nardo
- Produced by: Mario Bregni; Pietro Bregni
- Starring: Ira Fürstenberg; William Berger; Edwige Fenech; Howard Ross; Helena Ronée; Teodoro Corrà; Justine Gall; Edith Meloni; Mauro Bosco; Maurice Poli
- Cinematography: Antonio Rinaldi
- Edited by: Mario Bava
- Music by: Piero Umiliani
- Production company: Produzioni Atlas Consorziate
- Distributed by: Produzioni Atlas Consorziate
- Release date: 14 February 1970
- Running time: 81 minutes (Note: The American DVD release from Image Entertainment runs 78 minutes due to a lack of optimization to the NTSC format; when played at the correct speed, it is also 81 minutes. The Image version in fact contains roughly half a minute more footage than the original cut, due to a postponement of the fade-out during the final scene.)
- Country: Italy
- Language: Italian

Five Dolls for an August Moon (Italian: 5 bambole per la luna d'agosto) is a 1970 Italian giallo film directed and edited by Mario Bava, and starring Ira von Fürstenberg, William Berger, Edwige Fenech, Howard Ross, Ely Galleani and Maurice Poli. Inspired by Agatha Christie's novel And Then There Were None, the film's story concerns a group of people who have gathered on a remote island for fun and relaxation. One of the guests is a chemist who has created a revolutionary new chemical process, and several of the attending industrialists are eager to buy it from him. Business problems become moot when someone begins killing off the attendees one by one.

== Plot ==
At the private island retreat of wealthy industrialist George Sagan, a group of people, including scientist Frick Kruger, have assembled for a weekend getaway. After the first night, Kruger is enraged the next morning to discover that Stark and the other guests planned the getaway to persuade him to sell his latest invention, a formula for a revolutionary industrial resin, which he is reluctant to divulge due to his colleague's death during its invention.

Kruger's wife, Trud, is having an affair with Stark's artist wife, Jill. Stark's business partner, Nick, is verbally abusive to his coquettish wife Puch but does not object to her sleeping with other men, one of whom is the Starks' manservant, Jacques. Stark is less of a husband to Jill than a business manager; he arranges for her paintings and artwork to be publicly displayed but is a source of constant criticism. The sole happy couple is Nick's co-worker Jack and his wife Peg. Also on the island is Isabel, the teenage daughter of Stark's game warden; Isabel's parents are away for medical reasons.

As Stark, Nick and Jack badger Kruger for the formula—the original documents for which he has secretly destroyed—by offering him cheques for $1 million each from their Swiss bank accounts, Jill discovers the dead body of Jacques on the beach. Having already sent the motor launch away to prevent Kruger from leaving the island, and with the radio out of commission, Stark has no way to contact the mainland. Jacques's body is moved into a large walk-in freezer. The next morning, Kruger walks alone on the beach. Trud and Jill, walking hand-in-hand nearby, hear a gunshot and find Kruger's body. They run away to tell the others. The sniper, Isabel, drags Kruger's body to the sea.

As tempers flare after Kruger's apparent death and disappearance, more killings occur. Peg, standing on the balcony of her room, is shot dead by an unseen assailant. Jack arrives on the scene first and accuses Stark of being responsible. Puch is found to have been tied to a tree and stabbed in the chest. Jill turns up dead in her bathtub, her wrists slashed in an apparent suicide. Each of the bodies is placed in the freezer. The four remaining survivors—Stark, Jack, Nick, and Trud—hole up in Stark's living room for the night. After bickering with Trud, Nick storms off. The next morning, he too is found dead, and his body is placed in cold storage.

Stark offers Trud his cheque for Kruger's formula, which she reveals still exists on a microfilm, and uncovers a previously hidden motorboat which can take them to the mainland. As Stark returns to the house to get supplies, Jack confronts Stark and reveals he killed everyone except for Kruger to steal their cheques and eliminate any witnesses. Jack shoots Stark dead. Trud offers Jack the microfilm for his cheque. After the exchange, they both shoot each other. Isabel steals the cheque and the formula, but not before a dying Jack tries to stop her.

Some time later, a now-wealthy Isabel visits Kruger, alive and in prison, where he awaits execution for the murder of his colleague, the rightful inventor of the resin. Isabel claims that she loves Kruger and had decided to save him by rendering him unconscious with a sodium pentathol pellet of the kind her father had used to tranquilize animals, but was unaware of sodium pentathol's truth serum properties, leading him to confess to killing his partner to the authorities. Isabel reveals that she is broke, having cashed and spent George's and Jack's cheques but not Nick's due to her not knowing the account number. Aware of his inescapable fate and thankful to her, Kruger gives Isabel the number, and she happily leaves, instructing her chauffeur to drive her to Lausanne.

== Cast ==
- William Berger as Professor Frick Kruger (Gerry Farrell in the English dub)
- Ira von Fürstenberg (credited as Ira Fürstenberg) as Trud Larsen (Trudy Farrell)
- Edwige Fenech as Puch Chaney (Marie Chaney)
- Howard Ross as Jack Terrison (Jack Davidson)
- Helena Ronée as Peg Terrison (Peggy Davidson)
- Teodoro Corrà as George Sagan (George Stark)
- Ely Galleani (credited as Justine Gall) as Isabel
- Edith Meloni as Jill Stark
- Mauro Bosco as Jacques (Charles)
- Maurice Poli as Nick Chaney

== Production ==
Produzioni Atlas Consorziate (PAC) purchased Mario di Nardo's script with plans to make it into a vehicle for actress Edwige Fenech, though early publicity instead spotlighted Princess Ira von Fürstenberg (who was one of the film's principal investors). The film lost its director just days before filming was scheduled to begin, leading producers Mario and Pietro Bregni to appeal to Mario Bava to take over. Though there is no record of who the original director was, Bava biographer Tim Lucas reasons that it was mostly likely Guido Malatesta. Bava was very reluctant to take on the project, since he felt the script was a poorly written ripoff of Agatha Christie's novel And Then There Were None (1939), but agreed to do it under the condition that he be paid up front. He was further dismayed when, at the meeting where he was presented with the contract for the film, the Bregnis told him that the original director's departure was so last-minute that the cast and technical crew had already been selected and filming was to begin in just two days, leaving him no time to rework the script.

However, in addition to insisting on the use of his usual camera crew (headed by Antonio Rinaldi), Bava made two significant changes to the film's script: putting the corpses in polythene bags inside a walk-in freezer (di Nardo's script put them in underground graves with cross-shaped headstones) and adding on the twist ending with Kruger and Isabel.

The film's budget was so low that most of the cast had to wear their own clothes. The exterior of the Stark house was a matte painting painted by Bava himself, while the interior was a real beach house located not far from the beach where many of the scenes were filmed, on the Torre Astura coastline. Five Dolls for an August Moon was the only film where Bava had to do the editing entirely by himself.

== Release ==
Debuting on Valentine's Day 1970, Five Dolls for an August Moon was a failure at the Italian box office. The film was released in France as L'Île de l'épouvante (Island of Terror).

=== Home media ===
Five Dolls for an August Moon was long one of Bava's most obscure films, and did not receive an official American release until 2001 when Image Entertainment distributed it on DVD. After the Image disc went out of print, Anchor Bay Entertainment re-released the film as part of the Mario Bava Collection Volume 2 box set on 23 October 2007. In 2013, Kino Lorber released the film on Blu-ray in the United States. Scream Factory included the film in their Blu-ray box set The Mario Bava Collection, released in July 2025.

== Critical reception ==
Craig Butler of AllMovie gave the film two stars out of five, calling it "a confusing and not terribly exciting whodunit." Butler placed the blame for the film's failure primarily on the script, and commended Bava for managing to inject some visual interest into the weak material.

In his review of the 2013 American Blu-ray release for Slant Magazine, Budd Wilkins wrote, "Five Dolls for an August Moon isn't top-tier Bava by any means, but for those with eyes to see, there are pleasures aplenty to be gleaned from this playfully abstract jeu d'esprit."

In his commentary track for the Kino International Blu-ray release of the film, Bava scholar Tim Lucas argues strongly against Bava's own assessment of the film as one of his worst and calls it one of his most beautiful and innovative films.
