= Samson and the Slave Queen =

1963 film

- Directed by: Umberto Lenzi
- Screenplay by: Umberto Lenzi; Guido Malatesta
- Produced by: Fortunato Misiano
- Starring: Pierre Brice; Alan Steel
- Cinematography: Augusto Tiezzi
- Edited by: Jolanda Benvenuti
- Music by: Angelo Francesco Lavagnino
- Production company: Romana Film
- Distributed by: American International Pictures (US)
- Release date: 23 August 1963 (Italy)
- Running time: 90 minutes
- Country: Italy
- Languages: English; Italian

Samson and the Slave Queen (Italian: Zorro contro Maciste) is a 1963 Italian peplum directed by Umberto Lenzi. It was originally made as a Maciste film in Italy, in which the fabled strongman meets Zorro. It was redubbed into a "Samson" movie for distribution in the U.S. and "Samson" meets "El Toro" (instead of "El Zorro".)

== Plot ==
The king of Nogara dies, leaving behind a will naming one of his nieces as his successor. Will it be blonde and virtuous Isabella or evil, dark-haired Malva? Each woman relies on a hero to locate the will. Malva hires the bare-chested strongman Samson while Isabella relies on the masked El Toro (a.k.a. Zorro) even though her heart belongs to the mild-mannered poet, Ramon. Malva's ruthless desire for the throne soon alienates Samson and he and El Toro then team up to bring about a proper resolution to the Nogara succession. Meanwhile, Isabella learns El Toto's true identity, an identity which both surprises and pleases her.

== Cast ==
- Alan Steel as Maciste (Samson in the U.S. version)
- Pierre Brice as Zorro/Ramon (Ramon/El Toro in the U.S. version)
- Moira Orfei as Malva
- Maria Grazia Spina as Isabella
- Andrea Aureli as Rabek
- Andrea Scotti as Pedro
- Aldo Bufi Landi as Deikor
- Ignazio Balsamo as Joaquim
- Attilio Dottesio as General Saveria
- Loris Gizzi as Don Alvarez
- Nello Pazzafini as Rabek's Henchman
- Nazzareno Zamperla as Sadoch

== Release ==
Zorro contro Maciste was released in Italy on 23 August 1963. It was released in the United States as Samson and the Slave Queen as a double feature with Goliath and the Sins of Babylon on December 13, 1963. It opened in New York on 4 March 1964.

The Italian version's music is composed by Angelo Francesco Lavagnino while the American version of the film has a score by Les Baxter.

== Reception ==
From contemporary reviews, Howard Thompson of The New York Times reviewed the film under the title of Samson and the Slave Queen, describing the film as an "old-fashioned, prettily colored and costumed and pleasingly mounted dud". Thompson noted that there was no slave queen promised by the American title of the film. "Robe." of Variety declared the film to have "enough vim and vigor, thanks to a spirited performance by Pierre Brice as Zorro, to please the less-demanding beefcake-and-biceps aficionados." The rest of the review found that Lenzi focused on keeping the cast moving with emphasis on the fighting, and that the rest of the cast outside Brice was "only adequate".

== See also ==
- List of Italian films of 1963
