= Terror of the Steppes =

- Directed by: Tanio Boccia
- Written by: Tanio Boccia; Mario Moroni
- Produced by: Luigi Rovere
- Starring: Kirk Morris
- Cinematography: Aldo Giordani
- Music by: Carlo Rustichelli
- Release date: 1964
- Language: Italian

Terror of the Steppes (Italian: I predoni della steppa, also known as The Mighty Khan) is a 1964 Italian adventure film written and directed by Tanio Boccia and starring Kirk Morris.

== Cast ==
- Kirk Morris as Sandar Khan
- Moira Orfei as Malina
- Daniele Vargas as Altan Khan
- Ombretta Colli as Samira
- Peter White as Yessen Khan
- Giulio Donnini as Khan's Consouler
- Ugo Sasso as Ciukhai
- Attilio Dottesio as Commander of the Guards
- Furio Meniconi as Kublaï
