= Andrea Aureli =

Italian actor (1923–2007)

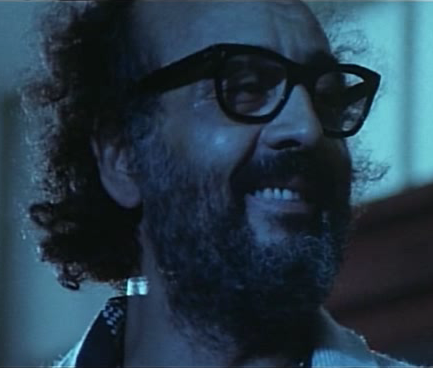
- Andrea Aureli in Furto di sera bel colpo si spera (1973)
- Born: 5 March 1923; Terni, Kingdom of Italy
- Died: 5 November 2007 (aged 84); Rome, Italy
- Occupation: Actor
- Years active: 1950–1998

Andrea Aureli (5 March 1923 – 5 November 2007) was an Italian actor.

== Life and career ==
Born in Terni, Aureli graduated from the Liceo classico in his hometown, then he enrolled the Centro Sperimentale di Cinematografia in Rome, graduating in 1947. Since the early 1950s he began an intense career as a character actor, being often cast in roles of villains and antagonists. In genre films, he was sometimes credited with the stage name Andrew Ray. He was also active in television films and series. Aureli retired from acting in 1998 and died in Rome on 5 November 2007 at 84 years old. His son Marco is a camera operator and an occasional actor.

== Selected filmography ==
- Addio, figlio mio! (1953)
- Ulysses (1954)
- The Violent Patriot (1956)
- Serenata a Maria (1957)
- The Black Devil (1957)
- Pirate of the Black Hawk (1958)
- The Sword and the Cross (1958)
- Love and Troubles (1958)
- The Mighty Crusaders (1958)
- Hannibal (1959)
- Legions of the Nile (1959)
- Ciao, ciao bambina! (1959)
- Duel of Champions (1961)
- Ursus and the Tartar Princess (1961)
- Fire Monsters Against the Son of Hercules (1962)
- Tiger of the Seven Seas (1962)
- Gladiator of Rome (1962)
- The Changing of the Guard (1962)
- Samson and the Slave Queen (1963)
- The Four Musketeers (1963)
- Revolt of the Barbarians (1964)
- The Beast of Babylon Against the Son of Hercules (1964)
- Hercules and the Black Pirates (1964)
- The Revenge of Ivanhoe (1965)
- Goliath at the Conquest of Damascus (1965)
- The Adventurer of Tortuga (1965)
- Maciste il vendicatore dei Maya (1965)
- Johnny Oro (1966)
- El Rojo (1966)
- Five Ashore in Singapore (1967)
- Psychopath (1968)
- Samoa, Queen of the Jungle (1968)
- The Son of Black Eagle (1968)
- Tarzana, the Wild Girl (1969)
- A Bullet for Sandoval (1969)
- Rough Justice (1970)
- Chuck Moll (1970)
- In Prison Awaiting Trial (1971)
- Don't Torture a Duckling (1972)
- Mark Shoots First (1974)
- Last Days of Mussolini (1974)
- The Gang That Sold America (1976)
- Lunatics and Lovers (1976)
- Stunt Squad (1977)
- Bianco, rosso e Verdone (1981)
- The Other Hell (1981)
- I due carabinieri (1984)
- One Hundred Days in Palermo (1984)
