= Hélène Chanel =

French actress

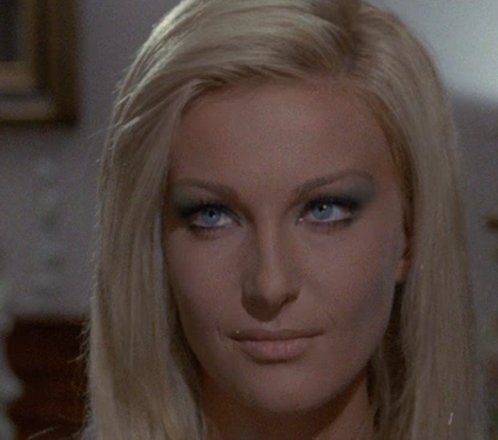
- Hélène Chanel in Nel sole (1967)
- Born: Hélène Stoliaroff; 12 June 1941 (age 85); Deauville, France
- Years active: 1959–1977

Hélène Chanel (born Hélène Stoliaroff; 12 June 1941 in Deauville, Calvados, France) is a French actress of Russian heritage. She was active in the 1960s in a variety of European international co-productions of Sword and sandal, Eurospy and Spaghetti Westerns. She was credited with a variety of names such as Hélène Chancel, Helen Chanel, Sheryll Morgan, Helen Stoliaroff and Hélène Stoliaroff.

== Biography ==
A former model, Helene entered films in 1959 in the film Les dragueurs opposite Ugo Tognazzi. Her surname was to have been changed to "Chancel", but an Italian publicity agent misspelled it to "Chanel".

== Partial filmography ==
- Les Dragueurs (1959) - Une invitée à la surboum
- Détournement de mineures (1959) - Christine
- Genitori in blue-jeans (1960) - Nuri
- My Friend, Dr. Jekyll (1960) - Rossana
- Le olimpiadi dei mariti (1960) - Elke
- Un dollaro di fifa (1960) - Alice Perkins
- Tu che ne dici? (1960) - Stella
- La ragazza sotto il lenzuolo (1961) - Dolly
- 5 marines per 100 ragazze (1961) - Elena, la maestra
- Samson and the Seven Miracles of the World (1961) - Liu Tai
- Gerarchi si muore (1961) - Italia
- The Witch's Curse (1962) - Fania
- Colpo gobbo all'italiana (1962) as the French blonde
- La monaca di Monza (1962) - Caterina
- Passport for a Corpse (1962) - Hélène
- I tre nemici (1962) - Jacqueline
- Avventura al motel (1963) - Madame de Sèvres
- La donna degli altri è sempre più bella (1963) - Donna Rossana (segment "La luna di miele")
- The Invincible Masked Rider (1963) - Carmencita
- Slave Girls of Sheba (1963) - Rosalana
- Two Mafiamen in the Far West (1964) - Betty Blanc
- Desert Raiders (1964) - Zaira
- Hercules of the Desert (1964) - Farida
- Samson and the Mighty Challenge (1964)
- Conqueror of Atlantis (1965) - Queen Ming
- Night of Violence (1965) - Carla Pratesi
- Operation Counterspy (1965) - Pat
- Ischia operazione amore (1966) - Beatrice Dinelli
- Agente segreto 777 - Invito ad uccidere (1966) - Jeanne Cartier
- Pleasant Nights (1966) - Violante (uncredited)
- Ring Around the World (1966) - Mary Brightford
- The Devil in Love (1966) - Clarice
- Killer Caliber .32 (1967) - Dolly
- El hombre de Caracas (1967)
- Cjamango (1967) - Pearl Hernandez
- 2 RRRingos no Texas (1967) - Sentenza Jane
- Death Rides Along (1967) - Dolores Talbot
- Nel sole (1967) - Ivana Vannucci
- Criminal Affair (1968) - Georgette
- Un posto all'inferno (1969) - Betsy
- Gangster's Law (1969) - contessa Elena Villani
- Death Knocks Twice (1969) - Angela
- La ragazza del prete (1970)
- Edipeon (1970)
- Boccaccio (1972) - Principessa di Civigni
- Gli amici degli amici hanno saputo (1973)
- Lips of Lurid Blue (1975) - Elli's Mother
- Lo sgarbo (1975)
- Stangata in famiglia (1976)
- Il bocconcino (1976) - Michela
- Rudeness (1977) - Lady White (final film role)
