= Samson vs. the Giant King =

- Directed by: Amerigo Anton
- Produced by: Luigi Rovere
- Cinematography: Aldo Giordani
- Music by: Carlo Rustichelli
- Release date: 1964
- Language: Italian

Samson vs. the Giant King (Italian: Maciste alla corte dello zar, also known as Giant of the Lost Tomb and Atlas Against the Czar) is a 1964 Italian fantasy-peplum film directed by Amerigo Anton.

== Plot ==
The czar Nicolas sends a secret mission of experts to find a hidden treasure. However, he also he prepares a group of mercenaries who should kill the members of the mission after their return.

== Cast ==
- Kirk Morris as Maciste / Samson
- Massimo Serato as Czar Nicola
- Ombretta Colli as Sonia
- Gloria Milland as Nadia
- Giulio Donnini as Igor
- Tom Felleghy (credited as Tom Felleghi) as Akim
- Dada Gallotti as Katia
- Ugo Sasso as Petrovic
- Renato Rossini as Chief of the Marauders
- Attilio Dottesio as Rebel Leader
