= The Commandant (film) =

- Directed by: Paolo Heusch
- Written by: Rodolfo Sonego
- Starring: Totò
- Cinematography: Alvaro Mancori
- Edited by: Licia Quaglia
- Music by: Piero Umiliani
- Release date: 1963
- Running time: 103 minutes
- Country: Italy
- Language: Italian

The Commandant, also known as Il comandante, is a 1963 Italian comedy-drama film directed by Paolo Heusch.

== Plot summary ==
Colonel Antonio Cavalli (Toto), promoted to general, after many years spent fighting in the army and commanding Italian Army troops in the Great War and the Second World War, is sent into retirement. But he, accustomed to the command of everything and everyone, cannot get used to quiet family life. He decides to work in an office. When Antonio discovers that his wife (Andreina Pagnani) is secretly paying his salary, this depresses him even more. Eventually two crooks involve him in a real estate ripoff, using his reputation they get him to him sign off on several frauds and scams, which threaten to send him to jail and compromises his high honor as an Italian Army General. On the brink of prison, the general attempts suicide, but once again his wife gets him out of the mess ...

== Cast ==
- Totò: Gen. Antonio Cavalli
- Andreina Pagnani: Francesca Cavalli
- Franco Fabrizi: Sandrelli
- Britt Ekland: Iris
- Carlotta Barilli: Luisa
- Luciano Marin: Franco Cavalli
- Linda Sini: La contessa
- Mario Castellani: Capitano Castelletti
