= Luciano Marin =

Italian actor (1931–2019)

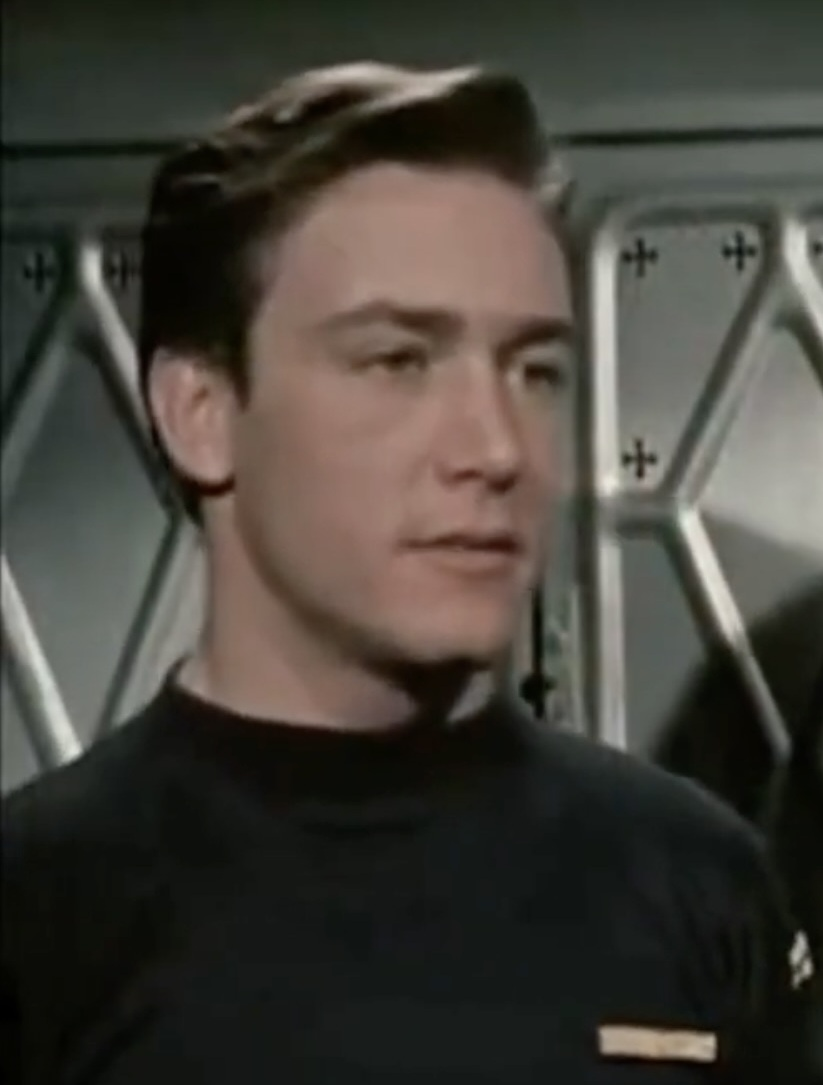
- Marin in Ragazzi della marina (1958)
- Born: 9 December 1931; Rome, Italy
- Died: 12 November 2019 (aged 87); Rome, Italy
- Occupation: Actor
- Years active: 1957–2019

Luciano Marin (9 December 1931 – 12 November 2019) was an Italian actor. He appeared in more than twenty films since 1957.

== Filmography ==
Year	Title	Role	Notes
1958	A Man of Straw	Gino	
1958	Napoli sole mio!	Sandro	
1958	The Law Is the Law	Mario	
1958	Three Strangers in Rome	Sandro Nencioni	
1958	Ragazzi della marina		
1959	First Love	Marco	
1959	Cavalier in Devil's Castle	Gianetto	
1959	The Overtaxed	Tino Pezzella	
1959	Son of the Red Corsair	Miguel di Montélimar	
1959	Goliath and the Barbarians	Marco	
1959	I mafiosi	Barone Alberto Monterosa	
1960	Siege of Syracuse	Marco	
1960	Fury of the Pagans	Donar	
1960	The Giants of Thessaly	Euristeo	
1961	The Tartars	Eric	
1961	Hercules and the Conquest of Atlantis	Illo	
1961	Duel of Champions	Eli	
1961	Solimano il conquistatore	Ivan	
1962	Fire Monsters Against the Son of Hercules	Aydar of the Sun People	
1962	War Gods of Babylon	Shammash	
1963	The Commandant	Franco, figlio di Antonio	
1963	La ragazza di Bube	Van den Berg	
1964	Intrigo a Los Angeles	David Blair	
1964	Samson and His Mighty Challenge	Inor	
1965	Fire Over Rome	Fulvius	
1965	Maciste il vendicatore dei Maya	Donar	
