= Maciste all'inferno (1925 film) =

Maciste in Hell
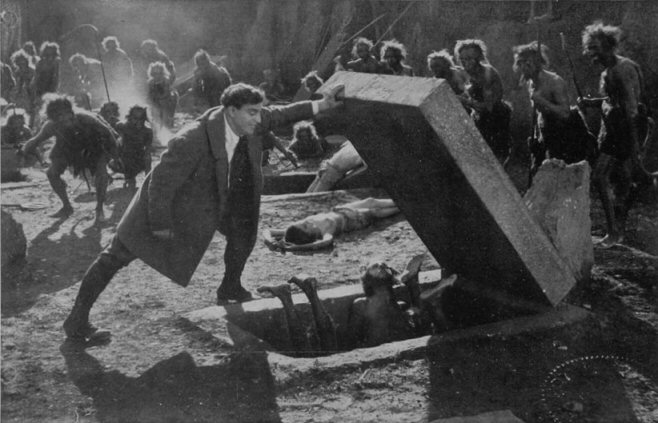
- Maciste all'inferno
- Directed by: Guido Brignone
- Screenplay by: Riccardo Artuffo and Stefano Pittaluga
- Cinematography: Ubaldo Arata and Massimo Terzano
- Release date: 1925
- Running time: 95 minutes
- Country: Italy
- Language: silent

Maciste all'inferno (Italian for "Maciste in Hell") is an Italian silent film directed by Guido Brignone and released in 1925. Starring Bartolomeo Pagano, the film was loosely remade during the peplum film cycle of the 1960s under the same title - released in the United States as The Witch's Curse - starring Kirk Morris.

== Plot ==
Maciste all'inferno (1925)

== Cast ==
- Bartolomeo Pagano: Maciste
- Umberto Guarracino: Ploutos
- Mario Saio: Gerione
- Franz Sala: Barbariccia
- Elena Sangro: Proserpina
- Lucia Zanussi: Luciferina
- Pauline Polaire: Graziella
- Sergio Amidei (not credited)
- Felice Minotti (not credited)
