= Fire Over Rome =

- Directed by: Guido Malatesta
- Screenplay by: Guido Malatesta; Giorgio Marzelli
- Produced by: Giorgio Marzelli
- Starring: Lang Jeffries; Cristina Galoni; Moira Orfei; Mario Felliciani
- Cinematography: Aldo Greci
- Edited by: Enzo Alfonzi
- Music by: Guido Robuschi; Gian Stellari
- Production companies: GMC; Jadran Film
- Distributed by: Variety Distribution
- Release date: 20 March 1965 (Italy)
- Running time: 80 minutes
- Country: Italy

Fire Over Rome (Italian: L'incendio di Roma) is a 1965 Italian peplum film directed by Guido Malatesta.

== Plot ==
After successfully campaigning in Gaul for several years, Consul Marcus Valerius arrived back in Rome with his legion. He and his men were looking forward to celebrating their return with their families and friends. The fearless warrior expected his Emperor to be pleased with his conquests, but Nero showed little interest. Other priorities were far more important. Nero ordered Marcus to assist Menecrate, the hated leader of the Praetorian Guards, in cleansing the city of its Christian presence but he refused and resigned as Consul in protest. He was immediately sentenced to death and his legion disbanded. Marcus Valerius is a valiant soldier and the killing of innocent people goes against all his principles. The former hero is now the hunted.

== Cast ==
- Lang Jeffries as Marcus Valerius
- Cristina Gajoni as Giulia
- Moira Orfei as Poppaea
- Mario Feliciani as Seneca
- Luciano Marin as Fulvius
- Evi Maltagliati as Livia Augusta, Marcus's Mother
- Franco Fantasia as Clodius

== Release ==
Fire Over Rome was released as L'incendio di Roma in Italy on 20 March 1965. In the UK it received a belated release in 1975 under the title Revenge of the Gladiators where it appeared on a double bill with the 1962 film Land of the Monsters.

== See also ==
- List of Italian films of 1965
