= Kirk Morris =

Italian bodybuilder and actor (born 1942)

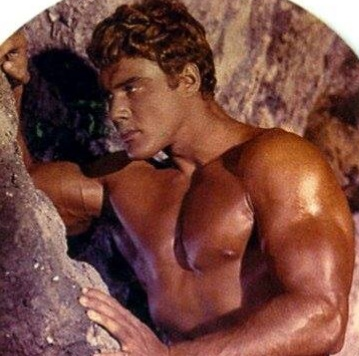
Kirk Morris

Kirk Morris (born 26 August 1942) is an Italian bodybuilder and actor, best known for his work in sword-and-sandal films.

== Life and career ==
Born in Venice as Adriano Bellini, while at university Morris devoted himself to bodybuilding and thanks to his physique he was chosen by the director Tanio Boccia to play the title role in The Triumph of Maciste. He subsequently starred in several other peplum films, including The Witch's Curse by Riccardo Freda. After the decline of the genre, he appeared in several adventure films, then he retired in the early 1970s. He was also an actor of Fotoromanzi.

== Filmography ==
- 1961 – Hercules in the Valley of Woe
- 1961 – Triumph of the Son of Hercules
- 1962 – Le Chevalier de Pardaillan
- 1962 – The Witch's Curse
- 1963 – Hercules, Samson and Ulysses
- 1963 – Samson and the Sea Beast
- 1963 – Colossus and the Headhunters
- 1964 – Hercules of the Desert
- 1964 – Desert Raiders
- 1964 – Devil of the Desert Against the Son of Hercules
- 1964 – Samson vs. the Giant King
- 1964 – Terror of the Steppes
- 1965 – The Falcon of the Desert
- 1965 – Maciste, the Avenger of the Mayans
- 1965 – Conqueror of Atlantis
- 1966 – 2+5: Missione Hydra
- 1967 – Rita of the West
- 1968 – Sapevano solo uccidere
- 1969 – The Seven Red Berets
- 1970 – Overrun!
