= Toto vs. Maciste =

- Directed by: Fernando Cerchio
- Written by: Bruno Corbucci; Giovanni Grimaldi; Ugo Liberatore; Gastone Da Venezia
- Story by: Ottavio Poggi
- Starring: Totò; Nino Taranto
- Cinematography: Angelo Lotti
- Music by: Francesco De Masi; Armando Trovajoli
- Release date: 28 February 1962
- Running time: 101 minutes
- Country: Italy
- Language: Italian

Toto vs. Maciste (Italian: Totò contro Maciste) is a 1962 Italian adventure-comedy film directed by Fernando Cerchio. It is a parody of the Sword and Sandal cinema, which was highly successful at the time in Italy.

== Plot ==
Totokamen is an entertainer and an illusionist who performs in various Egyptian nightclubs assisted by his manager, Tarantenkamen. Taking advantage of cheesy tricks, Totokamen pretends to be the son of the god Amun and to have divine superpowers. The Pharaoh Ramsis is in the meanwhile facing the betrayal by the strongman Maciste, who has inexplicably joined Egypt's historical enemies (the Assyrians) and is guiding them to an unstoppable attack to the country.

This is orchestrated by Ramsis' unfaithful wife, who has resorted to witchcraft to charme Maciste and achieve absolute power over the country. On the other hand Ramsis' daughter Nefertite is secretly in love with the strongman. Upon hearing from a minister about Totokamen's spectacle and claims of demigod status, the pharaoh decides that he should guide Egyptian defense against the invaders. Totokamen and Tarantenkamen try to avoid the dangerous assignment and to buy time in all possible ways, but the Assyrians continue their campaign and the invasion eventually reaches the crucial point of a duel between Totokamen and Maciste, in front of the whole royal court. Luckily the effect of Maciste's charming runs out at the last possible moment, and the plans of Ramsis' wife gets exposed. The Pharaoh remains in power, Maciste is pardoned, and Totokamen manages to exploit the confusion in order to escape from palace before being exposed as a fraud.

== Cast ==
- Totò as Totokamen / Sabakis, Totokamen's father
- Nino Taranto as Tarantenkamen
- Samson Burke as Maciste
- Nadine Sanders as Pharaoh's wife
- Nerio Bernardi as Pharaoh Ramsis
- Gabriella Andreini as Nefertite
- Luigi Pavese as owner of the nightclub
- Nino Marchetti as the great dignitary
- Piero Palermini as Baitan
- Carlo Taranto as Assyrian counsellor
