= Goliath and the Sins of Babylon =

- US film poster
- Directed by: Michele Lupo
- Written by: Lionello De Felice; Roberto Gianviti
- Starring: Mark Forest
- Cinematography: Mario Sbrenna
- Music by: Francesco De Masi; Les Baxter (US)
- Distributed by: American International Pictures (US)
- Release date: December 25, 1963
- Running time: 80 minutes (US version)
- Country: Italy
- Language: English

Goliath and the Sins of Babylon (Italian: Maciste l'eroe più grande del mondo) is a 1963 peplum film directed by Michele Lupo. The film was released in the US by American International Pictures as a double feature with Samson and the Slave Queen.

== Plot ==
Maciste (Goliath in the American release) is in Nefir, a vassal state of the Babylonian empire. He becomes involved in local politics when as part of their tribute to Babylon, Nefir must provide thirty virgin girls each year. When one escapes her captor Maciste vanquishes a large group of soldiers. He comes to the attention of the local resistance who conceal their military training to overthrow the regime by acting as gladiators. Maciste joins the Resistance along with a dwarf giving them a strength of 'forty-two and a half'. The film features a sea battle and a large scale chariot race.

== Cast ==
- Mark Forest as Goliath / Maciste
- José Greci as Regia /Chelima
- Giuliano Gemma as Xandros
- Erno Crisa as Morakeb
- Mimmo Palmara as Alceas
- Paul Muller as Rukus, King of Cafaus
- Livio Lorenzon as Evandrus
- Piero Lulli as Pergasus
- Eleonora Bianchi as The Girl of the Sacrifice
- Jacques Herlin as The Phoenician Merchant
- Alfio Caltabiano as Meneos
- Arnaldo Fabrizio as Goliath the Dwarf
