= Tanio Boccia =

Italian film director and screenwriter

- Born: 15 June 1911; Potenza, Italy
- Died: 12 March 1982 (aged 70); Rome, Italy
- Years active: 1960s

Camillo Tanio Boccia (15 June 1911 – 12 March 1982), was an Italian film director and screenwriter active between the 1950s and the early 1970s. From 1960 onwards, he was regularly credited as Amerigo Anton.

== Career ==
Born in Potenza, Basilicata, he started as a dancer and choreographer in Rome in the 1930s, later moving on to act in regional, dialectal stage plays. He had a small role in Variety Lights (1951) by Alberto Lattuada and Federico Fellini, his first and sole performance as a film actor. Boccia directed 20 low-budget films in his career. He is best known for his work in the adventure film genre, particularly peplum, in the early 1960s with films such as Caesar the Conqueror (1962), Samson Against the Pirates (1963) and Hercules of the Desert (1964). In 1965 he directed the spy adventure Agente X 1–7 operación Océano.

His films, generally rated as B or Z movies, always met negative reception and Boccia was often mocked in the Cinecittà environment, earning the nickname of "Italian Ed Wood" after his death. However, he has been re-evaluated in recent years, since his works, albeit rather poor, are considered "not at all the kind of cinematic disasters", and appreciated for his creativity in order to solve complicated situations, due to the low budget he had to work with. He was also labeled as the "Italian Roger Corman" for his ability to make a movie in a short time with low financial resources.

He died in 1982 in Rome.

== Selected filmography ==
- Drama on the Tiber (1952)
- The Conqueror of the Orient (1960)
- Triumph of the Son of Hercules (1961)
- Caesar the Conqueror (1962)
- Samson and the Sea Beast (1963)
- Samson vs. the Giant King (1964)
- Hercules of the Desert (1964)
- Desert Raiders (1964)
- Terror of the Steppes (1964)
- The Revenge of Ivanhoe (1965)
- Agente X 1–7 operazione Oceano (1965)
- Kill or Be Killed (1966)
- Kill the Wicked! (1967)
- Deadly Trackers (1972)
