= Maciste and the Javanese =

1922 film

- Directed by: Uwe Jens Krafft
- Written by: Georg Jacoby; Robert Liebmann
- Starring: Bartolomeo Pagano; Carola Toelle; Paul Otto
- Cinematography: Alfred Hansen; Giovanni Vitrotti
- Production company: Jakob Karol Film
- Release date: 1 June 1922
- Country: Germany
- Languages: Silent; German intertitles

Maciste and the Javanese (German: Maciste und die Javanerin) is a 1922 German silent adventure film directed by Uwe Jens Krafft and starring Bartolomeo Pagano, Carola Toelle and Paul Otto. Pagano stars as the strongman Maciste who had already appeared in several of Italian films.

The film's art direction was by Kurt Richter.

== Cast ==
- Bartolomeo Pagano as Maciste
- Carola Toelle
- Paul Otto
- Arnold Korff
- Tzwetta Tzatschewa
- Arnold Marlé
- Josef Rehberger
- Karl Platen
- Georg Baselt
- Willi Allen

== Bibliography ==
- Jacqueline Reich. The Maciste Films of Italian Silent Cinema. Indiana University Press, 2015.
