= Atlas in the Land of the Cyclops =

1961 film

Atlas Against the Cyclops
- Italian film poster
- Directed by: Antonio Leonviola
- Screenplay by: Oreste Biancoli; Gino Mangini
- Story by: Oreste Biancoli
- Produced by: Luigi Carpentieri; Ermanno Donati
- Starring: Gordon Mitchell; Chelo Alonso; Vira Silenti; Dante DiPaolo; Aldo Bufi Landi
- Cinematography: Riccardo Pallotini
- Edited by: Mario Serandrei
- Music by: Carlo Innocenzi
- Production company: Panda
- Release date: 29 March 1961 (Italy)
- Running time: 94 minutes
- Country: Italy
- Language: Italian

Atlas in the Land of the Cyclops (Italian: Maciste nella terra dei ciclopi) is a 1961 Italian epic adventure film starring Gordon Mitchell and Chelo Alonso.

== Plot ==
Queen Capys is doomed to a life of slavery by the Powers of Darkness until the last descendant of Ulysses is put to death to please the Cyclops. This is almost accomplished in a raid on a village by the Queen's soldiers where a descendant of Ulysses is killed and his wife enslaved; however, their infant son is taken away to be protected by Maciste.

== Cast ==
- Gordon Mitchell as Maciste
- Chelo Alonso as Queen Capys
- Vira Silenti as Queen Penope
- Dante DiPaolo as Ifito
- Aldo Bufi Landi as Sirone
- Giotto Tempestini as Aronio
- Raffaella Carrà as Eber
- Paul Wynter as Mumba
- Massimo Righi as Efros
- Aldo Pedinotti as Cyclops

== Release ==
Atlas Against the Cyclops was released in Italy on March 29, 1961 with a 90-minute running time. It was released in the United States on April 14, 1963 with a 100-minute running time.

== Reception ==
It has been objected that in spite of the original title there is no "Atlas" to be found in either the Italian nor the English dubbed film version.
