= Hercules in the Valley of Woe =

1961 film

- Film poster
- Directed by: Mario Mattoli
- Screenplay by: Marcello Marchesi; Vittorio Metz
- Produced by: Italo Matinenghi
- Starring: Kirk Morris; Franco Franchi; Ciccio Ingrassia
- Cinematography: Enzo Oddone
- Edited by: Roberto Cinquini
- Music by: Gianni Ferrio
- Release date: 19 December 1961 (Italy)
- Running time: 90 minutes
- Country: Italy

Hercules in the Vale of Woe (Italian: Maciste contro Ercole nella valle dei guai/ Maciste vs Hercules in the Valley of Woe), a.k.a. Hercules in the Valley of Woe, is a 1961 Italian Franco and Ciccio comedy film directed by Mario Mattoli and starring Kirk Morris as Maciste and Frank Gordon as Hercules. The film is a comical take on the popular sword-and-sandal epics of the 1950s and 1960s.

== Plot ==
In Milan, a major theater entrepreneur's going to put on a show period piece set in the era of mythological Greece. However, by a lucky accident, the company of actors and the entrepreneur himself are catapulted back in time just at the time of invincible warriors and heroes of Homer and Hesiod. Now we learn that the king Eurystheus needed to drive to Hercules, the invincible hero, able to defeat his arch enemy Maciste, who wants to kidnap his girlfriend Deianira.

== Cast ==
- Kirk Morris as Maciste
- Frank Gordon as Hercules
- Franco Franchi as Francheo
- Ciccio Ingrassia as Ingrassiade
- Bice Valori
- Mario Carotenuto
- Gianna Cobelli
- Carlo Croccolo
- Sandra Mondaini
- Liana Orfei
- Ombretta Ostenda
- Raimondo Vianello

== Release ==
Hercules in the Valley of Woe was released in Italy on 19 December 1961.

== See also ==
- List of films featuring Hercules

== Sources ==
- Kinnard, Roy; Crnkovich, Tony (2017). Italian Sword and Sandal Films, 1908-1990. McFarland. ISBN 978-1476662916.
