= Goliath and the Vampires =

- Italian theatrical release poster
- Directed by: Sergio Corbucci; Giacomo Gentilomo
- Screenplay by: Sergio Corbucci; Duccio Tessari
- Produced by: Paolo Moffa
- Starring: Gordon Scott; Leonora Ruffo; Jacques Sernas; Gianna Maria Canale
- Cinematography: Alvaro Mancori
- Edited by: Eraldo Da Roma
- Music by: Angelo Francesco Lavagnino
- Production company: Ambrosiana Cinematografica
- Distributed by: American International Pictures (United States)
- Release date: 21 July 1961 (Italy)
- Running time: 92 minutes
- Country: Italy

Goliath and the Vampires (Italian: Maciste contro il vampiro) is a 1961 Italian peplum film directed by Sergio Corbucci and Giacomo Gentilomo. The film features the famed superhero Maciste as its main character, although the American release changes his name to Goliath, as American International Pictures felt that the name "Maciste" was not significant to American audiences.

== Plot ==
Set in the ancient world, this film follows a powerful muscular man out to battle a vampire and his forces that go from village to village taking slaves and female victims.

== Cast ==
- Gordon Scott: Maciste
- Gianna Maria Canale: Astra
- Jacques Sernas: Kurtick
- Leonora Ruffo: Guja
- Annabella Incontrera: Magda
- Mario Feliciani: Omar

== Production ==
Both Giacomo Gentilomo and Sergio Corbucci are credited as directors of the film. Barry Atkinson stated Corbucci's input to the film was minimal.

== Release ==
Goliath and the Vampires was released theatrically in Italy as Maciste control il vampiro on 21 August 1961. It was released theatrically in the United States in April 1964, with the main character's name redubbed to Goliath, as American International Pictures felt that Maciste was not significant to American audiences. American International Television released the film to television as part of its 1968 Young Adult Theatre package as The Vampires.

The film was made available on home video by Something Weird.

== Reception ==
From contemporary reviews, the Monthly Film Bulletin stated that the film was a "mixture of handsomely decorated spectacle and the supernatural" with "first rate-editing". The review concluded that the reviewer "missed the guiding hands of a Bava or Cottafavi; and it seems probable that the film's intermittent drive and suspense can be more safely attributed to Corbucci than to his co-director, Giacomo Gentilomo" In Variety, the reviewer "Tube." declared that "even the most ardent devotees of these overstuffed, simpleminded muscle spasms from Italy figure to be disenchanted with this latest entry in that league." The review found the film "ludicrously written and crudely executed" and that Gordon Scott's acting was unsubtle.

From retrospective reviews, Howard Hughes wrote in his book on Italian cinema that Gordon Scott's performance was "above average" in comparison to other contemporary genre films. In their book on Italian Sword and Sandal Films, Roy Kinnard and Tony Crnkovich noted that the film's production design by Kosta Krivokapic and Gianni Polidori was aided by Alvaro Mancori's cinematography, which was described as "striking" and that the film was a memorable entry in the peplum film genre. The review also lamented that "most of the available prints have faded color." In his book on Italian peplum films, Barry Atkinson also praised the set design and cinematography as "an artful blend of creepy fantasy and Gothicism".
