= The Warrior (1916 film) =

1916 silent film

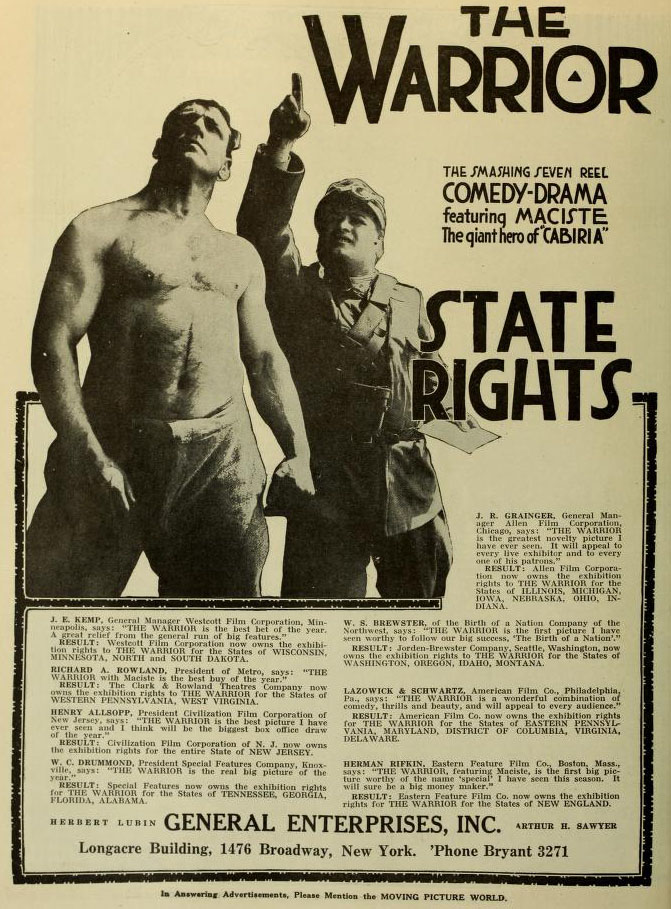
- Italian: Maciste alpino
- Directed by: Luigi Romano Borgnetto and Luigi Maggi
- Starring: Bartolomeo Pagano : Maciste; Valentina Frascaroli : Juliet; Enrico Gemelli : count of Pratolungo; Marussia Allesti : countess of Pratolungo; Felice Minotti; Fido Schirru : Fritz Pluffer; Evangelina Vitaliani
- Production company: Itala Film
- Release date: 1916
- Running time: 85 minutes
- Country: Italy
- Languages: Silent; Italian intertitles

The Warrior (1916)

The Warrior (Italian: Maciste alpino) is a 1916 film directed by Luigi Romano Borgnetto and Luigi Maggi and starring Bartolomeo Pagano in the role of Maciste.

== Production ==
This is one of the first films starring the character of Maciste, who Giovanni Pastrone created in 1914 Cabiria. It saw huge success in Italy and abroad and whose name is due to Gabriele D'Annunzio who thus created a neologism that is still in use today. The warrior is the best-known and critically praised film of the Maciste series.

The film is not far from what the series (with the exception of Maciste in hell) became: an escapist fantasy with the horrors of the First World War not really addressed.

== Bibliography ==
Notes

References

- Paris, Michael (August 6, 2019). First World War and Popular Cinema: 1914 to the Present. Edinburgh University Press. ISBN 9781474471527. - Total pages: 240
- Reich, Jacqueline (2015). The Maciste Films of Italian Silent Cinema. Indiana University Press. ISBN 9780253017482. - Total pages: 432
