= Hercules of the Desert =

- Directed by: Tanio Boccia
- Written by: Mario Moroni; Alberto De Rossi; Tanio Boccia
- Produced by: Luigi Rovere
- Starring: Kirk Morris; Hélène Chanel
- Cinematography: Aldo Giordani
- Edited by: Tanio Boccia
- Music by: Carlo Rustichelli
- Release date: 1964
- Country: Italy
- Language: Italian

Hercules of the Desert (Italian: La valle dell'eco tonante/ Valley of the Thundering Echo), aka Maciste and the Women of the Valley, is a 1964 Italian peplum film directed by Tanio Boccia and starring Kirk Morris.

== Plot ==
A fabulous land of green pastures is protected from invasion by the mysterious Valley of the Thundering Echo. Queen Farida draws together the desert tribes to conquer the land, even though a prophecy has promised the land to the Gameli tribe. The Gameli journey to the Silver Temple, where the High Priest summons the legendary Maciste from the mountain rock to defeat their enemies and guide them to their promised land. Maciste materializes magically from a rock wall in a cave in this film, tying in with Maciste's claim in earlier films that his name means born of the rock.

== Cast ==
- Kirk Morris as Maciste
- Hélène Chanel as Farida
- Alberto Farnese as Masura
- Špela Rozin as Selina
- Furio Meniconi as Manatha
- Rosalba Neri as Ramhis
- Nando Tamberlani as Manata the Savvy
- Dante Posani as Tarash
