= Mole Men Against the Son of Hercules =

- Directed by: Antonio Leonviola
- Screenplay by: Marcello Baldi; Giuseppe Mangione
- Story by: Antonio Leonviola; Giuseppe Mangione
- Starring: Mark Forest; Moira Orfei; Raffaella Carrà; Paul Wynter
- Cinematography: Alvaro Mancori
- Edited by: Otello Colangeli
- Music by: Armando Trovajoli
- Production company: Leone Film
- Release date: 10 October 1961
- Running time: 99 minutes
- Country: Italy

Mole Men Against the Son of Hercules (Italian: Maciste, l'uomo più forte del mondo/ Maciste, the Strongest Man in the World) is a 1961 Italian peplum film directed by Antonio Leonviola and starring Mark Forest.

== Plot summary ==
The young Princess Saliura has been captured by a fierce cave-dwelling people. Maciste and his friend Bangor, in whose care she was left, allow themselves to be also captured and imprisoned. They find themselves in a series of deep caverns, occupied by a race of mutant white-haired albino people. They are living under an ancient curse, by which they cannot emerge onto the surface, except by moonlight, and sunlight is deadly to them. They worship the goddess of the moon.

The 'mole men', led by Halis Mosab, a tyrannical and bloodthirsty non-albino queen, are using the captured people as slaves to operate their diamond mining operations. Saliura is assisted in an escape and is taken to sanctuary with the Guardians of the Sacred Waterfall. But she is betrayed and recaptured. Maciste and Bangor are forced to fight each other and then a ferocious ape in order to save the life of the princess, but she's condemned to be sacrificed anyway. Maciste not only survives, but escapes and saves Bangor and Saliura. Trapped in the caverns, the now-freed slaves break out onto the surface, thanks to Maciste's strength. Halis Mosab, who has become aware that she was captured as a child and somehow became queen of the 'mole men', is overjoyed when she comes to the surface and finds that she can live in the sunlight. But she accidentally falls off a cliff and into the waters of the Sacred Waterfall. The fate of her people is not revealed.

== Cast ==
- Mark Forest as Maciste
- Moira Orfei as Queen Halis Mosab
- Paul Wynter as Bangor
- Raffaella Carrà as Princess Saliurà
- Enrico Glori as Kahab
- Gianni Garko as Katan
- Roberto Miali as Loth
- Nando Tamberlani as King of Aran
- Carla Foscari
- Rosalia Gavo
- Graziella Granata
- Janine Hendy as Black slave girl
- Cinzia Cam
- Bruna Mori
- Anna De Martino
- Franca Polesello
- Gloria Hendy as Tulac
- Luciana Vivaldi

== Release ==
Mole Men Against the Son of Hercules was released on 10 October 1961.
