= Alvaro Mancori =

Italian cinematographer (1923–2011)

- Born: 15 September 1923; Rome, Lazio, Italy
- Died: 24 June 2011 (aged 87); Rome, Lazio, Italy
- Occupations: Cinematographer, director, producer
- Years active: 1947-1971 (film)

Alvaro Mancori (1923–2011) was an Italian cinematographer. He also directed two films, and acted as producer on several others.

== Selected filmography ==
- The Accusation (1950)
- Auguri e figli maschi! (1951)
- Tragic Return (1952)
- The Mute of Portici (1952)
- Mata Hari's Daughter (1954)
- The Violent Patriot (1956)
- The Wanderers (1956)
- The Beautiful Legs of Sabrina (1958)
- La cambiale (1959)
- The Moralist (1959)
- Toto in Madrid (1959)
- Vacations in Majorca (1959)
- Gentlemen Are Born (1960)
- Letto a tre piazze (1960)
- I piaceri dello scapolo (1960)
- Goliath and the Vampires (1961)
- Totò, Peppino e... la dolce vita (1961)
- Ulysses Against the Son of Hercules (1962)
- The Lion of St. Mark (1963)
- Toto and Cleopatra (1963)
- The Commandant (1963)
- Hercules the Invincible (1964)
- The Tramplers (1965)
- The Strange Night (1967)
- Darling Caroline (1968)

== Bibliography ==
- Klossner, Michael. The Europe of 1500-1815 on Film and Television: A Worldwide Filmography of Over 2550 Works, 1895 Through 2000. McFarland, 2002.
