= Colossus and the Headhunters =

1963 film

- Directed by: Guido Malatesta
- Screenplay by: Guido Malatesta
- Story by: Guido Malatesta
- Produced by: Giorgio Marzelli
- Starring: Kirk Morris; Laura Brown; Demeter Bitenc
- Cinematography: Domenico Scala
- Edited by: Enzo Alfonzi
- Music by: Guido Robuschi; Gian Stellari
- Production companies: RCM Produzione Cinematografica; Alta Vista
- Release date: 10 January 1963
- Running time: 81 minutes
- Country: Italy
- Language: English

Colossus and the Headhunters (Italian: Maciste contro i cacciatori di teste, lit. 'Maciste against the head-hunters'), is a 1963 Italian sword-and-sandal film written and directed by Guido Malatesta and starring Kirk Morris.

== Plot ==
The heroic Maciste arrives on an island, only to find it rocked by a catastrophic volcanic eruption and sinking. The survivors board Maciste's raft, and he pilots toward a nearby yet unknown island. The group are captured by a tribe led by the beautiful Queen Amoa. Her people are under repeat attack by another tribe on the island—a tribe of savage headhunters. Maciste and his survivors decide to help her, so he and some of his friends set out to find Amoa's father. They travel to a ruined castle occupied by the hunters—previously a great city of gold—and find Amoa's father, now blind, imprisoned alone in one of the dungeon rooms by the hunters.

The headhunter leader captures Amoa and decides to marry her by compelling her father to give his blessing. A large battle erupts at Amoa's village when the hunters attack. During the fight, the leader abducts Amoa. Maciste pursues them, saves Amoa, and fights and defeats the leader. Having saved the day, Maciste sails away on his raft with Amoa.

== Production ==
Colossus and the Headhunters was partially shot in Ljubljana in Yugoslavia. For some special effects scenes, Maletesta re-used the volcano footage from his previous film Fire Monsters Against the Son of Hercules. Filming was finished in 1962, which allowed the director to finish working on Fire Monsters Against the Son of Hercules.

== Release ==
Colossus and the Headhunters was released in Italy on 10 January 1963 with an 81-minute running time. The film was featured on the film-mocking television show Mystery Science Theater 3000 on August 20, 1994.

== Reception ==
In a contemporary review, the Monthly Film Bulletin, who commented on the special effects, noting that the "volcanic eruption is remarkably crude" and the "earthquake's flying boulders are subsiding ground are only slightly more effective." The review also commented on the films dubbing, finding it "abysmal".

From retrospective reviews, Gary Allen Smith wrote in his book Epic Films, that the film was "definitely one of the worst peplum films" noting that it included "some of the most ridiculous dialogue ever dubbed". In his book Cinema Italiano, Howard Hughes referred to the film as "by-the-numbers peplum". Barry Atkinson referred to the film as "not quite the nadir of bad filmmaking, but getting there" and declared the film as "lowbrow as peplum can possibly get [...] despite cardboard effects, corny dialogue and a hesitant performance from Morris [...] [the film] brings a smile to the face."
