= Hercules Against the Mongols =

- Directed by: Domenico Paolella
- Screenplay by: Alessandro Ferrau; Luciano Martino; Domenico Paolella
- Produced by: Jacopo Comin
- Starring: Mark Forest; Jose Greci; Maria Grazia Spina; Ken Clark; Howard Ross
- Cinematography: Raffaele Masciochi
- Edited by: Otello Colangeli
- Music by: Carlo Savina
- Production companies: Alta Vista; Jonia Film
- Distributed by: Variety Distribution
- Release date: 29 November 1963 (Italy)
- Running time: 90 minutes
- Country: Italy

Hercules Against the Mongols (Italian: Maciste contro i mongoli, lit. 'Maciste Against the Mongols') is a 1963 Italian peplum film directed by Domenico Paolella.

== Plot ==
The heirs of Genghis Khan conquered the city of Tudela and took prisoner Bianca (José Greci), the daughter of the king. Hercules (Maciste (Mark Forest) in the original version of the film) is sent to the rescue.

Though Genghis Khan eventually sought peace with the West, his death in 1227 AD puts into power his three war-like sons: Sayan, Susdal, and Kin Khan. These sons quickly overrun the city of Tuleda and take prisoner Princess Bianca, though young Prince Alessio escapes. Hercules comes to the rescue of Bianca, winning her freedom in a tournament in exchange for becoming a slave himself. Forces from the West soon come to re-take Tuleda and Hercules — freed from his bonds — helps to dispatch Genghis Khan's three sons while again saving Bianca and reuniting her with her young brother.

== Cast ==
- Mark Forest as Hercules/Maciste
- Maria Grazia Spina as Ljuba
- Ken Clark as Sayan
- José Greci as Bianca
- Howard Ross as Susdal
- Nadir Moretti as Kin Khan
- Tullio Altamura as Osvaldo
- Bianca Doria as Raja
- Giuseppe Addobbati as The King

== Release ==
The film was released in Italy on 29 November 1963.
