= Samson and His Mighty Challenge =

- Directed by: Giorgio Capitani (co-plotter)
- Written by: Sandro Continenza; Roberto Gianviti
- Produced by: Giorgio Cristallini
- Starring: Alan Steel; Howard Ross; Nadir Baltimore; Yann Larvor; Livio Lorenzon
- Music by: Piero Umiliani
- Production companies: Senior Cin. ca Les Films Regent
- Distributed by: Variety Distribution
- Release date: 1965
- Running time: 100 minutes
- Countries: Italy; Spain; France
- Language: Italian

Samson and His Mighty Challenge is a 1964 Italian sword-and-sandal film, released in 1965 at the very tail end of the peplum craze. Its original title was Ercole, Sansone, Maciste e Ursus gli invincibili (Hercules, Samson, Maciste, and Ursus: the Invincibles). It is also known as Samson and the Mighty Challenge, Combate dei Gigantes (Battle of the Giants), Triumph of the Giants or Le Grand Defi (The Great Battle).

== Synopsis ==
Hercules argues with his father Zeus who thinks that his son should follow the road of virtue. Instead, Hercules follows the road of pleasure which leads him to the city of Lydia. There he falls in love with the princess Omphale and he asks from her mother Nemea permission to marry her. Although Nemea is thrilled with the idea of having a demigod as a husband for her daughter, Omphale doesn't even want to hear about it because she is in love with Inor the barbarian prince. So the couple crafts a cunning plan.

They hide their dwarf friend under the statue of Zeus and he tells Hercules that in order to marry Omphale he must battle with the most powerful man in the world: Samson. Hercules agrees and the queen sends a messenger to tell Samson about the fight. Samson agrees, although his wife Delilah thinks that it is not a good idea because her husband has a taste for beautiful women. So Delilah cuts his hair and makes him weak. However, the messenger does not know this, and he thinks that his wife doesn't let him go. In order to return to Lydia with Samson, he hires the troublemaker Ursus who recently lost a fight to Maciste to kidnap him.

== Cast ==
- Alan Steel as Hercules
- Howard Ross as Maciste
- Nadir Moretti (credited as Nadir Baltimore) as Samson
- Yann L'Arvor as Ursus
- Luciano Marin as Inor
- Hélène Chanel as Astra
- Elisa Montés as Omphale
- Lia Zoppelli as Nemea
- Moira Orfei as Delilah
- Maria Luisa Ponte as Ursus' mother
- Conrado San Martín as Marinero
- Livio Lorenzon
- Carlo Tamberlani

== Reinterpretation ==
In 1993, this film was used in the comedy film Hercules Returns. The film uses the original film, overdubbed by Australian actors, as part of the plot.

== Bibliography ==
- Hughes, Howard (2011). Cinema Italiano - The Complete Guide From Classics To Cult. London - New York: I.B.Tauris. ISBN 978-1-84885-608-0.

== See also ==
- List of films featuring Hercules
