= Howard Ross (actor) =

Italian actor (born 1941)

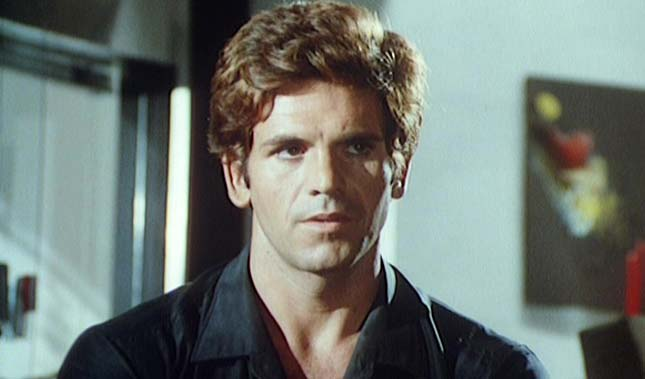
- Ross in Five Dolls for an August Moon (1970)
- Born: Renato Rossini; 10 January 1941 (age 85); Rome, Italy
- Occupation: Actor
- Years active: 1960–1995

Howard Ross (born Renato Rossini; 10 January 1941) is an Italian film actor.

Born in Rome, Rossini got his first major roles in peplum films. In the mid-1960s, he adopted the stage name Howard Ross. He was mainly active in genre films, specializing in adventure films, giallo films and poliziotteschi.

== Selected filmography ==
- Hercules Against the Mongols (1963)
- Hercules the Invincible (1964)
- Samson and His Mighty Challenge (1964)
- Gladiators Seven (1964)
- Hercules Against the Barbarians (1964)
- Sword of the Empire (1965)
- The Relentless Four (1965)
- Johnny Colt (1966)
- Dirty Heroes (1967)
- Desert Commandos (1967)
- Emma Hamilton (1968)
- Wrath of God (1968)
- Bridge Over the Elbe (1969)
- Poppea's Hot Nights (1969)
- Battle of Neretva (1969)
- Five Dolls for an August Moon (1970)
- Viva Cangaceiro (1970)
- Marta (1971)
- Naked Girl Killed in the Park (1972)
- Poppea: A Prostitute in Service of the Emperor (1972)
- Il Boss (1973)
- The Man Called Noon (1973)
- Those Dirty Dogs (1973)
- Stateline Motel (1973)
- Number One (1973)
- The Killer Reserved Nine Seats (1974)
- Five Women for the Killer (1974)
- Order to Kill (1975)
- One Man Against the Organization (1975)
- Oh, Serafina! (1976)
- Werewolf Woman (1976)
- Merciless Man (1976)
- The Pyjama Girl Case (1977)
- Interno di un convento (1977)
- L'Immoralitá (1978)
- The Mafia Triangle (1981)
- The New York Ripper (1982)
- Warriors of the Year 2072 (1984)
- I giorni dell'inferno (1986) - Grayson
- Vacanze di Natale '95 (1995) - Bob
