= Triumph of the Son of Hercules =

- Directed by: Tanio Boccia
- Written by: Arpad DeRiso; Nino Scolari
- Produced by: Mario Borghi
- Starring: Kirk Morris
- Cinematography: Oberdan Troiani
- Music by: Carlo Innocenzi
- Release date: 1961
- Country: Italy
- Language: Italian

Triumph of the Son of Hercules (Italian: Il trionfo di Maciste) is a 1961 Italian peplum film directed by Tanio Boccia and starring Kirk Morris.

== Cast ==
- Kirk Morris as Maciste
- Cathia Caro as Antea
- Ljuba Bodina as Tenefi
- Cesare Fantoni as Agadon
- Giulio Donnini as Omnes
- Attilio Dottesio as Arsino
- Carla Calò as Yalis, the Oracle
- Aldo Bufi Landi as Thermail
