= The Witch's Curse =

- Directed by: Riccardo Freda
- Screenplay by: Oreste Biancoli; Piero Pierotti
- Story by: Ennio De Concini
- Produced by: Ermanno Donati; Luigi Carpentieri
- Starring: Kirk Morris; Hélène Chanel; Vira Silenti; Andrea Bosic; Charles Fernley Fawcett
- Cinematography: Riccardo Pallottini
- Edited by: Ornella Micheli
- Music by: Carlo Franci
- Production company: Panda Cinematografica
- Distributed by: Regional
- Release date: 11 April 1962 (Italy)
- Running time: 91 minutes
- Country: Italy
- Box office: ₤277 million

The Witch's Curse (Italian: Maciste all'inferno, lit. 'Maciste in Hell') is a 1962 Italian peplum-fantasy film, directed by Riccardo Freda.

== Plot ==
In the mid-16th century, a witch is burned in Scotland and places a curse on the inhabitants before she dies. In the 17th century (One hundred years later), the tree she was chained to and burned still stands with no one daring to destroy it. The curse remains by forcing women to commit suicide. The witch's descendant, Martha Gunt, is sentenced to be burned for witchcraft.

As she is placed in a prison cell, Maciste comes forth to fight evil. When he uproots the cursed tree, he finds an entrance to Hell where he attempts to track down the original witch to rescind her curse and attempts to help the damned from their plight.

== Cast ==
- Kirk Morris as Maciste
- Hélène Chanel as Fania
- Vira Silenti as Martha Gunt
- Angelo Zanolli as Charlie Law
- Andrea Bosic as Judge Parrish
- Charles Fernley Fawcett as the Doctor
- Remo De Angelis as Prometheus
- John Karlsen as Il burgomastro
- Gina Mascetti as L'ostessa
- Puccio Ceccarelli as Golia

== Production ==
The Castellana Caves which still serve as a tourist attraction, were used for the underground scenes. The sequences set in the Hell were entirely filmed in the Castellana Caves, in the province of Bari. Maciste, the leading character, was turned during the filming into an almost mute character as Freda was very unhappy with the acting skills of the main actor Kirk Morris. The film is referred as "an interpretation of mythology cum the gothic horror genre".

== Release ==
The Witch's Curse was released in Italy on April 11, 1962. It grossed a total of 277 million Italian lire domestically in Italy.

== See also ==
- List of films about witchcraft
