= Fire Monsters Against the Son of Hercules =

- Italian film poster
- Directed by: Guido Malatesta
- Screenplay by: Arpad DeRiso; Guido Malatesta
- Produced by: Giorgio Marzelli; Alfio Quattrini
- Starring: Reg Lewis; Margaret Lee; Luciano Marin
- Cinematography: Giuseppe La Torre
- Music by: Guido Robuschi; Gian Stellari
- Production companies: Euro International; Caserbib
- Distributed by: Variety Distribution
- Release date: 25 April 1962 (Italy)
- Running time: 82 minutes
- Countries: Italy; Yugoslavia

Fire Monsters Against the Son of Hercules (Italian: Maciste contro i mostri) is a 1962 film directed by Guido Malatesta that was filmed in Yugoslavia and Italy.

== Plot summary ==
Set in the Ice Age, a nomadic tribe of sun worshippers reach an area they decide to settle in. When Idar and Rhia, a young couple of the tribe come across a water monster, the monster is killed by Maciste with a spear. The two ask Maciste to join their tribe but Maciste explains he has a destiny to fulfill of righting wrongs and must leave.

Soon afterwards a cave dwelling tribe of moon worshippers led by Fuwan attack the village and carry off the sun worshipper's women. Maciste returns to the sun worshippers and enters the moon worshipper's underground city through a river. There he discovers Moah, whose father and brother, formerly leaders of the tribe, were murdered by Fuwan who wishes to take Moah. Moah explains that the moon worshippers will sacrifice the captured women in a celebration of the full moon that night.

Maciste passes through an underwater tunnel, defeats the three headed hydra that lives there and is able to eliminate the guards to the entrance and remove the stone gate to the entrance letting the vengeful sun worshippers in. The women are freed but Maciste destroys their path to the surface once they have left and is captured by the moon worshippers who bury him, and later Moah in the earth so the worms may eat their bodies. They are saved by a volcanic eruption that sets them free and kills a large portion of the moon worshippers.

Seeking revenge, the moon worshippers make a pact with a tribe of cannibals to attack the sun worshippers. The combined forces are defeated by the sun worshippers and Maciste. Moah joins Maciste on his future journeys.

== Cast ==
- Reg Lewis as Maciste/ Maxus
- Margaret Lee as Moah
- Luciano Marin as Idar son of Dorak
- Andrea Aureli as Fuan of the Moon People
- Birgit Bergen as Raya
- Nello Pazzafini as Chief of the Ulmar People
- Miria Kent as Woman of the Sun
- Fulvia Gasser as Woman of the Sun
- Rocco Spataro as Dorak
- Ivan Pengov as Agur

Monsters include a river sea serpent, a lizard (scaled from a real lizard), and a four-footed walking dragon.

== Production ==
Fire Monsters Against the Son of Hercules was a co-production between Italy's Euro International Film and Yugoslavia's Caserbib. The film was shot at Incir De Paolis Studios in Rome and on location in the caves of Ljubljana in Slovenia.

In the English-language version, Maciste is called "Maxus", referring to him as a son of Hercules. Maciste's name is changed to Maxus, so whenever Maxus' name is mentioned, a different higher-registered voice adds the dubbed name.

== Release ==
The film was released in Italy on 25 April 1962. In the UK it was originally released as Colossus of the Stone Age in 1964, and retitled Land of the Monsters for its 1975 re-release paired with the 1965 film Revenge of the Gladiators.

== Reception ==
In his book on Italian cinema, Howard Hughes discussed the English-language dub of the film, declaring it "probably the worst dubbing job of all time".
