= Guido Malatesta =

Italian director and screenwriter

- Born: 1919; Gallarate, Italy
- Died: 14 June 1970 (aged 50–51); Rome, Italy
- Other name: James Reed
- Years active: 1954 - 1970

Guido Malatesta (1919 – 14 June 1970), born in Gallarate, Italy, was a film director and screenwriter.

He began working as a professional journalist. After he moved to Rome, he was drawn to cinema, as creator of treatments, then scriptwriter and assistant director, and finally becoming director in 1957 with the film The Billionaires. He continued to make films until a few days before his death in 1970. He was known for his Peplum movies and having a simple fun style without being overdone by plot.

His most popular of the present remains Colossus and the Headhunters and Fire Monsters Against the Son of Hercules. The former is notable for having no monsters which went against the tradition of the sword and sandal genre as well as being the subject of a 1994 episode of the popular movie-mocking television show Mystery Science Theater 3000. He wrote the story and screenplay of Devil of the Desert Against the Son of Hercules.

In the sixties, following the fashion of the time, he signed a few films with the Americanized name of "James Reed".

== Selected filmography ==
- For You I Have Sinned (1953)
- Barrier of the Law (1954)
- Head of a Tyrant (1959)
- Colossus and the Headhunters (1962)
- Fire Monsters Against the Son of Hercules (1963)
- The Son of Black Eagle (1968)
- Five Dolls For an August Moon (1970)

== External links and sources ==
- Guido Malatesta at IMDb
