= Ornella Micheli =

Italian film editor

- Micheli in Ti ricordi di Lucio Fulci?
- Died: 2006 or later
- Occupation: Film editor
- Years active: 1950–1981
- Relatives: Bruno Micheli (brother)

Ornella Micheli (sometimes credited as Donna Christie or Ornella Micheli Donati) was an Italian film editor active from the 1950s through the 1980s. She often worked on the exploitation films and thrillers of directors Lucio Fulci, Riccardo Freda, and Giuliano Carnimeo.

== Biography ==
Micheli's father was Roberto Rosselini key grip. Through him, she became an apprentice to Rosselini's editor, Jolanda Benvenuti, and subsequently worked with Roberto Cinquini. Micheli edited more than 60 films across several genres, including adventure films, comedies, gothic films, spaghetti westerns, horror films and pornographic films. Her collaborations included directors Riccardo Freda, Lucio Fulci, and Joe D'Amato.

Micheli was married to production manager Piero Donati, the brother of producer Ermanno Donati.

Her brother, Bruno Micheli, worked as her assistant from 1964 onwards.

In an article on Ornella Micheli published in 2018, which was largely based on an interview with Bruno Micheli on April 2, 2016, Dalila Missero wrote that Micheli had "passed away almost ten years ago".

== Selected filmography ==
- The Lion of Amalfi (1950)
- Samson and the Seven Miracles of the World (1961)
- The Horrible Dr. Hichcock (1962)
- Marco Polo (1962)
- The Witch's Curse (1962)
- Le massaggiatrici (1962)
- Uno strano tipo (1963)
- The Magnificent Adventurer (1963)
- The Avenger of Venice (1964)
- Samson in King Solomon's Mines (1964)
- Operation Goldsinger (1965)
- How We Got into Trouble with the Army (1965)
- The Hills Run Red (1966)
- The Brute and the Beast (1966)
- The Third Eye (1966)
- The Wacky World of James Tont (1966)
- Operazione San Pietro (1967)
- Bang Bang Kid (1967)
- How to Kill 400 Duponts (1967)
- Suicide Commandos (1968)
- Find a Place to Die (1968)
- The Moment to Kill (1968)
- I am Sartana, Your Angel of Death (1969)
- One on Top of the Other (1969)
- Light the Fuse... Sartana Is Coming (1970)
- Sartana's Here... Trade Your Pistol for a Coffin (1970)
- They Call Him Cemetery (1971)
- Guns for Dollars (1971)
- Don't Torture a Duckling (1972)
- Return of Halleluja (1972)
- His Name Was Holy Ghost (1972)
- White Fang (1973)
- Holy God, Here Comes the Passatore! (1973)
- Challenge to White Fang (1974)
- Piange... il telefono (1975)
- Dracula in the Provinces (1975)
- My Sister in Law (1976)
- The Psychic (1977)
- Cugine mie (1978)
- Silver Saddle (1978)
- Beyond the Darkness (1979)
- Sesso nero (1980)
- Antropophagus (1980)
- Erotic Nights of the Living Dead (1980)
- Porno Holocaust (1981)
