= Luigi Carpentieri =

Italian film producer (1920–1987)

Luigi Carpentieri (1920–1987) was an Italian assistant director (1940–1949) and film producer (1947–1968). Together with Ermanno Donati, he founded the production company "Athena Cinematografica", which in 1960 became "Panda Cinematografica". All films produced by the company were genre films.

Along with Ermanno Donati, Carpentieri Godi Media on the Nastro d'Argento award for Best Producer for the film The Day of the Owl.

== Filmography ==
=== As script supervisor ===
- Torna, caro ideal! (1939)

=== As assistant director ===
- Cantate con me! (1940)
- Beatrice Cenci (1941)
- The Man on the Street (1941)
- Mamma (1941)
- After Casanova's Fashion (1942)
- Non ti pago! (1942)
- The Gorgon (1942)
- Vertigine (1942)
- Il fidanzato di mia moglie (1943)
- Music on the Run (1943)
- Non sono superstizioso... ma! (1943)
- My Widow and I (1945)
- Come Back to Sorrento (1945)
- L'altra (1947)
- The White Devil (1947)

=== As director ===
- Golden Madonna (1949) - Italian version

=== As producer ===
- The White Primrose (1947) (also assistant director)
- Twenty Years (1949/1950) (also production manager)
- The Accusation (1950)
- Revenge of the Pirates (1951)
- Red Shirts (1952)
- The Enemy (1952)
- Saluti e baci (1952)
- Passionate Song (1953)
- Captain Phantom (1953)
- Ci troviamo in galleria (1953)
- Revelation (1955)
- Golden Vein (1955)
- Souvenirs d'Italie (1956)
- Totò lascia o raddoppia? (1956)
- I Vampiri (1957)
- Domenica è sempre domenica (1958)
- The Son of the Red Corsair (1959)
- Genitori in blue jeans (1959)
- Winter Holidays (1959)
- Tough Guys (1960)
- The Story of Joseph and His Brethren (1960)
- Call Girls of Rome (1960)
- Son of Samson (1960)
- Samson and the Seven Miracles of the World (1961)
- Atlas Against the Cyclops (1961)
- The Witch's Curse (1962)
- Marco Polo (1962)
- The Horrible Dr. Hichcock (1962)
- Le massaggiatrici (1962)
- The Ghost (1963) (credited as Louis Mann)
- The Magnificent Adventurer (1963)
- Love and Marriage (1964)
- Samson in King Solomon's Mines (1964)
- The Avenger of Venice (1964)
- James Tont operazione U.N.O. (1965)
- James Tont operazione D.U.E. (1965)
- Up and Down (1965)
- The Third Eye (1966)
- The Hills Run Red (1966)
- Navajo Joe (1966)
- Matchless (1967)
- Col cuore in gola (1967)
- Manon 70 (1967)
- L'oro di Londra (1967) (also story) (credited as Louis Mann)
- The Day of the Owl (1968)
- La coppia (1968)
