= Bruno Scipioni =

Italian actor (1934–2019)

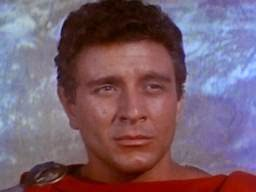
- Scipioni in Maciste in King Solomon's Mines (1964)
- Born: 29 July 1934; Rome, Italy
- Died: 5 December 2019 (aged 85); Rome, Italy
- Occupations: Actor, voice actor
- Years active: 1959–2000
- Children: Carlo Scipioni

Bruno Scipioni (29 July 1934 – 5 December 2019) was an Italian actor and voice artist.

== Biography ==
Born in Rome, Scipioni graduated in accountancy and then, in 1958, he attended the Centro Sperimentale di Cinematografia. He started his film career with Kapò (1959) and he was particularly active during the 1960s, usually being cast as a character actor. He was also active on stage, in television series, in commercials and as a voice actor.

Bruno Scipioni died on 5 December 2019, at the age of 85. He was the father of voice actor Carlo Scipioni.

== Selected filmography ==
- Terror of the Red Mask (1960) - Ribelle
- Messalina (1960)
- Letto a tre piazze (1960) - The Hotel Waiter
- Silver Spoon Set (1960) - Minor role (uncredited)
- Kapo (1960)
- Il carro armato dell'8 settembre (1960)
- Madri pericolose (1960) - Party Guest
- I Teddy boys della canzone (1960) - Police radio Operator
- Garibaldi (1961) - Lieutenant Adolfo Faconti
- The Assassin (1961)
- Ghosts of Rome (1961) - Otello l'idraulico
- A Day for Lionhearts (1961)
- Queen of the Seas (1961)
- Always on Sunday (1962) - Il garagista
- Warriors Five (1962) - Angelino
- Samson Against the Sheik (1962) - Luis
- La bellezza di Ippolita (1962)
- Le massaggiatrici (1962) - Hotel Doorman
- The Rebel Gladiators (1962)
- Sexy Toto (1963)
- Medusa Against the Son of Hercules (1963)
- Zorro and the Three Musketeers (1963)
- The Magnificent Adventurer (1963) - Una Guardia
- Mad Sea (1963)
- Tutto il bello dell'uomo (1963)
- The Organizer (1963)
- Hercules Against the Mongols (1963)
- I 4 tassisti (1963)
- I terribili 7 (1963) - Cronista
- Heroes of the West (1964) - Verdugo
- La ragazza di Bube (1964) - Mauro (uncredited)
- Seduced and Abandoned (1964) - (uncredited)
- The Avenger of Venice (1964)
- Hercules Against the Barbarians (1964)
- I marziani hanno 12 mani (1964)
- Maciste in King Solomon's Mines (1964) - Kadar
- I nuvoloni (1964)
- Cuatro balazos (1964) - Jurado
- Romeo and Juliet (1964) - Balthasar
- Three for a Robbery (1964)
- Red Desert (1964)
- Time of Indifference (1964)
- I gemelli del Texas (1964)
- Hercules and the Treasure of the Incas (1964) - Darmon Henchman
- Love and Marriage (1964) - Il secondo uomo (segment "L'ultima carta")
- Revenge of the Gladiators (1964) - Guard
- The Naked Hours (1964) - Marcello
- Challenge of the Gladiator (1965)
- Up and Down (1965)
- The Possessed (1965)
- Sandra (1965) - Minor role (uncredited)
- James Tont operazione U.N.O. (1965) - Doorkeeper's Friend
- For One Thousand Dollars Per Day (1966)
- Europa canta (1966) - Nicky, the Italian
- Ringo and His Golden Pistol (1966) - Townsman
- El Greco (1966) - Officer
- Love Italian Style (1966) - Corrispondente
- Io non protesto, io amo (1967) - Ghighi - Record Store Owner
- The Handsome, the Ugly, and the Stupid (1967)
- Marinai in coperta (1967) - Sergeant
- The Pizza Triangle (1970) - Pizza maker
- White Sister (1972) - Chiacchiera
- Le mille e una notte... e un'altra ancora! (1973) - Ar Dashir
- The Sensuous Sicilian (1973) - Vincenzo Torrisi
- Commissariato di notturna (1974) - Brigadiere Talentini
- La figliastra (1976) - Barone Francesco 'Cocò' Laganà
- Ridendo e scherzando (1978) - Un agente
- Dark Illness (1990) - (voice)
- Cominciò tutto per caso (1993) - Padre di Stefania
