= The Accusation (1950 film) =

1950 film

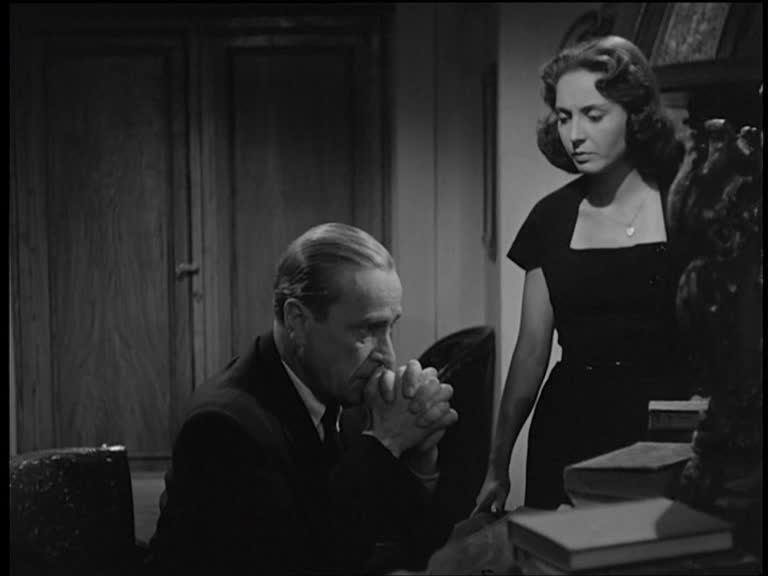
- Karl Ludwig Diehl and Lea Padovani
- Directed by: Giacomo Gentilomo
- Written by: Franco Brusati; Gaspare Cataldo; Giacomo Gentilomo
- Produced by: Luigi Carpentieri; Ermanno Donati
- Starring: Marcello Mastroianni
- Cinematography: Alvaro Mancori
- Edited by: Otello Colangeli
- Release date: 4 November 1950
- Running time: 99 minutes
- Country: Italy
- Language: Italian

The Accusation (Italian: Atto d'accusa) is a 1950 Italian crime-melodrama film directed by Giacomo Gentilomo.

== Cast ==
- Lea Padovani as Irene
- Marcello Mastroianni as Renato La Torre
- Andrea Checchi as Inspector Constantini
- Marga Cella as Miss Inghirami
- Emma Baron
- Alda Mangini
- Karl Ludwig Diehl as Massimo Ruska
- Amilcare Pettinelli as Donate
- Gaetano Verna
- Mary Genni
- Silvana Muzi
- Alessio Ruggeri
- Maria Pia Spini
