= Samson and the Seven Miracles of the World =

- Directed by: Riccardo Freda
- Screenplay by: Oreste Biancoli; Duccio Tessari
- Story by: Oreste Biancoli
- Produced by: Ermanno Donati; Luigi Carpentieri
- Starring: Gordon Scott; Yoko Tani; Hélène Chanel
- Cinematography: Riccardo Pallotini
- Edited by: Ornella Micheli
- Music by: Carlo Innocenzi
- Production companies: Panda Cinematografica; Gallus Film
- Release date: 31 October 1961 (Italy)
- Running time: 94 minutes
- Countries: Italy; France
- Box office: £468.2 million

Samson and the Seven Miracles of the World (Italian: Maciste alla corte del Gran Khan, lit. 'Maciste at the Court of the Great Khan') is a 1961 international co-production starring Gordon Scott. The film reused the sets, extras and Yoko Tani as a princess from Marco Polo (1961) and Freda's The Mongols (1961). The film was distributed in the United States by American International Pictures.

== Plot ==
In his eternal wandering Maciste finds himself in 13th Century China rescuing a Chinese prince and princess from the Tartars and leading the Chinese into a revolt against them.

"In the 13th century, Garak, ruthless master of the Mongols, descended upon Asia. His savage warrior bands were composed of many tribes and were unity only by their desire for conquest and the will of Garak. They spilled into Panyu and plunged once mighty China into the darkness of slavery and misery. This is the story of the man who rose up against Garak and the Mongols; the young giant who was to strike terror into the hearts of the invaders. He assumed the name of Samson to match his size and feats of strength. His destiny was to perform the 7 Miracles. To ring the great Bell of Freedom, which was China's ancient call to arms. To arouse the people from their apathy. Only a few dared to oppose the Mongols. Under the leadership of the rebel Cho, they sought as best they could to break the grip of Garak the Mongol."

== Cast ==
- Gordon Scott as Maciste (Samson in the American version)
- Yoko Tani as Princess Lei-ling
- Hélène Chanel as Kiutai
- Dante DiPaolo as Bayan
- Gabriele Antonini as Prince Cho
- Leonardo Severini as Garak
- Valéry Inkijinoff as Tao
- Franco Ressel as Captain of the guards

== Production ==
After the enormous popular success of Hercules, producers and screenwriters began developing other films about muscular heroes performing amazing feats. Most were drawn from literary figures or the Bible, while Maciste was an Italian creation who first appeared in Cabiria (1914). Producer Ermanno Donati thought of the idea of resurrecting Maciste for new audiences, as his brother Piero Donati explained. The producers first shot the film Maciste nella valle dei re.

Freda's film Maciste alla corte del Gran Khan was what was called a "film di recupero" in Italy, meaning a recovery film. The film was created in order to earn money from the expensive epic Marco Polo.

== Release ==
Maciste alla corte del Gran Khan was released in Italy on October 31, 1961 where it was distributed by Jolly Film in Rome and Unidis throughout Italy. The film grossed 467.2 million Italian lire on its theatrical release.

The film was released theatrically in the United States as Samson and the 7 Miracles of the World. The American version of the film was distributed by American International Pictures and had its score changed from Carlo Innocenzi to one by Les Baxter.

== Reception ==
A contemporary review in the Monthly Film Bulletin noted that the film was "All in all, one of the better Italian spectacles" and that it was "well photographed this time in lovely (though occasionally uneven), restrained colours." and "Freda keeps his camera well back, the better to make attractive, sculptural compositions.

This film has been evaluated as being among director Riccardo Freda's "better" contributions to the peplum genre.
