= The Rebel Gladiators =

1962 Italian film

- Directed by: Domenico Paolella
- Written by: Domenico Paolella; Sergio Sollima; Alessandro Ferrau
- Produced by: Splendor Film/ Ferdinando Felicioni
- Starring: Dan Vadis; Jose Greci; Alan Steel; Gloria Milland
- Cinematography: Carlo Bellero
- Music by: Carlo Savina
- Distributed by: Medallion; Palisades Intl.
- Release date: 1962
- Running time: 98 minutes
- Language: Italian

The Rebel Gladiators (Italian: Ursus il gladiatore ribelle/ Ursus, the Rebel Gladiator) is a 1962 Italian peplum film directed by Domenico Paolella starring Dan Vadis, Josè Greci and Alan Steel.

== Plot ==
The newly crowned emperor Commodus kidnaps the beautiful Arminia, who happens to be betrothed to the mighty gladiator Ursus. Obsessed with a desire to physically best all other men, he uses the girl as a hostage to force Ursus to fight him in the arena, but when Ursus beats him up and actually forces the dictator to beg for his life, he accuses Ursus of being in league with a group of usurpers who oppose Commodus' tyrannical rule. Ursus finally leads a slave revolt that overthrows Commodus, who is killed in the uprising, and Ursus is reunited with Arminia.

== Cast ==
- Dan Vadis as Ursus
- Josè Greci as Arminia
- Alan Steel as Commodo/Commodus
- Tullio Altamura as Antonino
- Nando Tamberlani as Marco Aurelio
- Gloria Milland
- Gianni Santuccio as Emilio Leto
- Sal Borghese as gladiator
- Bruno Scipioni
- Andrea Aureli as gladiator instructor
- Carlo Delmi as Settimio
