= Samson Against the Sheik =

- Directed by: Domenico Paolella
- Cinematography: Carlo Bellero
- Music by: Carlo Savina
- Release date: 1962
- Language: Italian

Samson Against the Sheik (Italian: Maciste contro lo sceicco, also known as Maciste Against the Sheik) is a 1962 Italian peplum film directed by Domenico Paolella.

In the late 1500s, forces of the Duke of Malaga topple the Sacred Obelisk in the North African city of Melida before they're defeated by the local Sheik. The Sheik's men then sail to Spain and kidnap the Duke's daughter, Isabella. Antonio, who loves Isabella, now travels to Melida with his friend, Maciste, to rescue her as well as her imprisoned father. They're soon captured and Maciste is forced to single-handedly re-erect the fallen obelisk before he and Antonio make their escape. The two men then seek to finish rescuing Isabella and restoring her father to his dukedom.

== Cast ==
- Ed Fury: Samson/Maciste
- Erno Crisa: Sheik
- Gisella Arden: Isabella
- Mara Berni: Zuleima
- Giuseppe Addobbati: Duke of Malaga
- Anna Ranalli: Consuelo
- Piero Lulli: Ramiro
- Massimo Carocci: Antonio
- Carlo Pisacane: Alì
- Bruno Scipioni: Luis
- Nazzareno Zamperla: Fighter (uncredited)

== See also ==
- Maciste against the Sheik (1926)
