= Goliath at the Conquest of Damascus =

Goliath at the Conquest of Damacus
- Directed by: Domenico Paolella
- Screenplay by: Luciano Martino; Domenico Paolella; Ernesto Gastaldi
- Produced by: Fortunato Misiano
- Starring: Peter Lupus; Mario Petri; Helga Liné; Atruro Domenici
- Cinematography: Augusto Tiezzi
- Music by: Angelo Francesco
- Release date: 3 March 1965
- Running time: 95 minutes
- Country: Italy

Goliath at the Conquest of Damascus (Italian: Golia alla conquista di Bagdad, lit. 'Goliath at the Conquest of Baghdad') is a 1965 Italian peplum film directed by Domenico Paolella.

== Plot ==
The king of the Kurds has kidnapped the daughter of the king of Baghdad to blackmail him. Goliath is sent to the rescue.

== Cast ==
- Peter Lupus: Goliath (credited as Rock Stevens)
- Mario Petri: Yssour
- Helga Liné: Fatma
- Arturo Dominici: Kaichev
- Piero Lulli: Thor
- Anna Maria Polani: Myriam
- Marino Masé: Phir
- Daniele Vargas: Saud
- Mino Doro: King Selim
- Andrea Aureli: Bhalek
- Nello Pazzafini: Horval
- Dario Michaelis: Safawidi

== Release ==
Goliath at the Conquest of Damascus was released on 3 March 1965.

== See also ==
- List of Italian films of 1965

== Footnotes ==
=== References ===
- Kinnard, Roy; Crnkovich, Tony (2017). Italian Sword and Sandal Films, 1908-1990. McFarland. ISBN 978-1476662916.
