= Domenico Paolella =

Italian director, screenwriter and journalist (1915–2002)

Domenico Paolella (18 October 1915 – 7 October 2002) was an Italian director, screenwriter and journalist.

Born in Foggia, between 1933 and 1935, Paolella won several contests for amateur directors; in the same years he started working as a journalist for several newspapers and magazines. In 1937, he entered the film industry as assistant of Carmine Gallone for Scipio the African, and the following year made his debut as a director of short films. During the war, he was correspondent from the Soviet front. From 1946 to 1951, he was artistic director and chief editor of the INCOM newsreel production company.

In 1939, Paolella directed his first feature film, The Last of the Road. In subsequent years, he first directed a series of musical films of great success produced by Carlo Infascelli, then he specialized in the comic genre. Paolella directed his last film in 1979, and briefly rejoined the industry in the early nineties when he collaborated on several screenplays for films directed by Sergio Sollima, Stelvio Massi, Lamberto Bava and Aldo Lado.

== Selected filmography ==
- The Thrill of the Skies (1940, only screenwriter)
- A Thief in Paradise (1952)
- Canzoni di mezzo secolo (1952)
- Cavalcade of Song (1953)
- Il coraggio (1955)
- Destination Piovarolo (1955)
- Songs of Italy (1955)
- Red and Black (1955)
- Pirates of the Coast (1960)
- Guns of the Black Witch (1961)
- The Secret of the Black Falcon (1961)
- Samson Against the Sheik (1962)
- Women of Devil's Island (1962)
- Avenger of the Seven Seas (1962)
- Hercules Against the Mongols (1963)
- The Rebel Gladiators (1963)
- Hercules and the Tyrants of Babylon (1964)
- Hercules Against the Barbarians (1964)
- Challenge of the Gladiator (1965)
- Goliath at the Conquest of Damascus (1965)
- Hate for Hate (1967)
- Execution (1968)
- La ragazza del prete (1970)
- Story of a Cloistered Nun (1973)
- The Nun and the Devil (1973)
- The Prey (1974)
- Stunt Squad (1977)
- Gardenia (1979)
