= Challenge of the Gladiator =

- Directed by: Domenico Paolella
- Starring: Peter Lupus
- Music by: Giuseppe Piccillo
- Distributed by: Variety Distribution
- Release date: 1965
- Country: Italy
- Language: Italian

Challenge of the Gladiator (Italian: Il gladiatore che sfidò l'impero) is a 1965 Italian peplum film directed by Domenico Paolella.

== Plot ==
Treacherous Roman senator Lucius Quintilius plans a secret journey into Thrace to recover a legendary treasure. He is accompanied by his daughter Livia posing as a Christian slave girl, his cruel henchman Commodio, and Terenzius, an ex-gladiator and Nero look-alike who fools the local Thracians into believing he is the real Emperor. But Lucius's plans are thwarted by Spartacus and his band of rebels who succeed in capturing the treasure for Thrace. When news arrives from Rome that the real Nero has died, local Roman governor Consul Metellus joins forces with Spartacus to defeat the traitors.

== Cast ==
- Peter Lupus: Spartacus (credited as Rock Stevens)
- Massimo Serato: Senator Lucio Quintilio
- Gloria Milland: Livia
- Livio Lorenzon: Commodio
- Piero Lulli: Consul Metello
- Walter Barnes: Terenzo
- Andrea Checchi
- Dario Michaelis
- Franco Ressel
- Bruno Scipioni
- Salvatore Borghese: Gladiator
