= Navajo Joe =

1966 film by Sergio Corbucci

- Italian film poster by Renato Casaro
- Directed by: Sergio Corbucci
- Screenplay by: Piero Regnoli; Fernando di Leo
- Story by: Ugo Pirro
- Produced by: Ermanno Donati; Luigi Carpentieri
- Starring: Burt Reynolds; Aldo Sambrell; Nicoletta Machiavelli; Fernando Rey; Tanya Lopert; Franca Polesello; Lucia Modugno
- Cinematography: Silvano Ippoliti
- Edited by: Alberto Gallitti
- Music by: Ennio Morricone
- Production companies: Dino de Laurentiis Cinematografica; C.B. Films
- Release date: November 1966 (Italy)
- Countries: Italy; Spain
- Language: Italian

Navajo Joe is a 1966 spaghetti Western film directed by Sergio Corbucci and starring Burt Reynolds as the titular Navajo Indian who opposes a group of bandits responsible for killing his tribe.

== Plot ==
Having massacred an Indian village with his gang, scalp hunter Duncan rides to the nearest town to discover that he is now an outlaw, as scalp hunting is now illegal. Duncan murders the sheriff and begins burning the town. In the town, Duncan meets Lynne, the town doctor, who conspires with Duncan to steal a train full of the bank's money. Three female entertainers and their manager overhear talk of the plot and ride to the next town of Esperanza to warn people. Several of Duncan's gang attempt to kill them, but their scheme is thwarted by Navajo Joe.

Joe steals the train back from Duncan's gang. He asks the townspeople of Esperanza to pay him to protect them from Duncan, demanding, "I want a dollar a head from every man in this town for every bandit I kill." The townspeople reject him, as they "don't make bargains with Indians." Lynne's wife Hannah persuades them otherwise. Joe sets a trap for Duncan, but is caught and tortured, and Lynne and Hannah are killed. Rescued by the entertainers' manager, Joe again steals the train and wipes out Duncan's gang.

A showdown occurs in an Indian cemetery, where Joe reclaims the pendant that Duncan had stolen from his wife when he murdered her. As Joe turns, Duncan shoots him with a hidden gun. Injured, Joe grabs a tomahawk and throws it, hitting Duncan square in the forehead. With Duncan dead, Joe sends his horse back to town, carrying the bank's money. The townspeople are surprised that Joe has kept his word and are relieved that their money has been returned. Estella, disappointed in the attitudes of the townspeople and grateful for what Joe has done for them, sends the horse back to be reunited with him, leaving Joe's final fate ambiguous.

== Cast ==
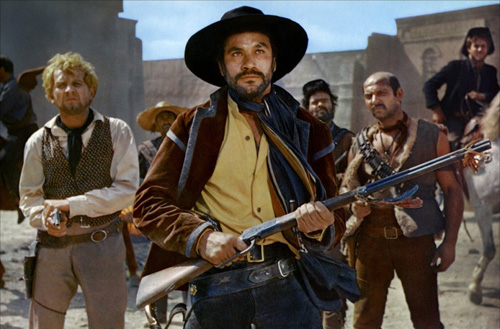
Aldo Sambrell as Duncan in Navajo Joe

- Burt Reynolds as Joe "Navajo Joe"
- Aldo Sanbrell as Mervyn "Vee" Duncan
- Nicoletta Machiavelli as Estella
- Fernando Rey as Father Rattigan
- Tanya Lopert as Maria
- Franca Polesello as Barbara
- Lucia Modugno as Geraldine
- Peter Cross as Dr. Chester Lynne
- Roberto Paoletti as Sheriff Johnson
- Nino Imparato as Chuck Holloway, Banjo Player
- Lucio Rosato as Jeffrey Duncan
- Valeria Sabel as Hannah Lynne
- Mario Lanfranchi as Jefferson Clay, The Mayor of Esperanza
- Angel Alvarez as Oliver Blackwood, Bank Manager
- Rafael Albaicin as Mexican scalphunter
- Lorenzo Robledo as Robledo, Duncan Gang Member
- Álvaro de Luna as Sancho Ramirez, Duncan Gang Member
- Valentino Macchi as Gringo Scalphunter
- Maria Cristina Sani as Joe's Wife
- Gianni di Stolfo as Sheriff Elmo Reagan
- Simon Arriga as "Monkey", Duncan gang member
- Cris Huerta as "El Gordo"
- Angel Ortiz as "El Cojo"
- Roderick Auguste as Ciudadano
- Dianick as Swedish Settler

== Production ==
Producer Dino De Laurentiis approached director Sergio Corbucci with a script titled Un dollaro a testa (lit. 'A Dollar a Head'). Corbucci claimed that Marlon Brando was promised to him for the lead role in the film. De Laurentiis cast Reynolds for the role because he felt that Reynolds resembled Brando.

Reynolds was a friend of Clint Eastwood, who had raved to Reynolds about a director named Sergio. Eastwood introduced Reynolds to De Laurentiis, who was looking for an actor who could do his own stunts. Reynolds went to Italy in April 1966. He later spoke about his time in Europe, explaining that "... the only thing today for an American actor is to go to Europe for $350,000, crinkle up the film, jump up and down a couple of times and you've got it made."

De Laurentiis announced that the film would be part of a six-picture deal that he had with United Artists, which included films titled Absurd Universe, Matchless, A River of Dollars (with Reynolds and Henry Silva, later filmed as The Hills Run Red with Thomas Hunter replacing Reynolds), The Bandit (with Clint Eastwood) and Waterloo. De Laurentiis received many script re-writes from Piero Regnoli and Fernando di Leo; after the sixth draft, he approved the script. Reynolds was surprised that the cast was predominantly non-English-speaking and that the director was not Sergio Leone as he had thought, but Sergio Corbucci. Reynolds would later state that the film had failed because he had worked with "the wrong Sergio."

Reynolds has stated that the Italian crew did not know what "real Indians" looked like, saying his wig made him look like Natalie Wood. Reynolds added, "... of course when you play a half-breed you have to be stoic – and you can't get funky – and you have to have a deep voice. Apparently there are no Indians with high voices. And you have to shave your arms all the time. It's easy to get the left but just try and reach the right." Commenting on his role in the film, Reynolds felt that the physical aspects did not worry him, but that his costumes did.

Of his work, Corbucci declared that he made "... European Westerns the way they like them over here. Plenty of action. Little talk. And I have the privilege of changing at a moment's notice the costumes and geography."

== Release ==
Navajo Joe was released in Italy in November 1966 and in the United States in 1967.

== Reception ==
In a contemporary review, Bosley Crowther of The New York Times dismissed the film as "colorless" and another of the "... super-bloody 'Westerns' made by Italians and Spaniards in Spain with Italian, Spanish and American actors." Variety noted that Regnoli and Di Leo's screenplay allowed for "... fast movement which Corbucci handles well enough", ultimately declaring the film to be "Lowercase western ... Okay for minor action market."

In a retrospective review, Ken Tucker of Entertainment Weekly gave the film a D rating, calling it "a dubbed Italian botch", finding it inferior to another Western that he reviewed, Man of the West.

Burt Reynolds described Navajo Joe as "so awful it was only shown in prisons and airplanes because nobody could leave. I killed ten thousand guys, wore a Japanese slingshot and a fright wig." When Reynolds won an Emmy in 1991 for Evening Shade, he said during his acceptance speech, "All those pictures – Navajo Joe – they paid off, you know."
