= Uno strano tipo =

- Directed by: Lucio Fulci
- Screenplay by: Vittorio Metz; Lucio Fulci
- Story by: Vittorio Metz
- Starring: Adriano Celentano
- Cinematography: Guglielmo Mancori
- Edited by: Ornella Micheli
- Production company: Giovanni Addessi Produzione Cinematografica S.p.A.
- Release date: March 6, 1963 (Bari)
- Running time: 90 minutes
- Country: Italy
- Box office: ITA 87 million

Una strano tipo (lit. 'A Strange Type') is a 1963 Italian musicarello directed by Lucio Fulci. The film stars musician Adriano Celentano as himself. Celentano arrives in a small town on vacation when he finds that everyone in town hates him. He soon finds out a local troublemaker named Peppino is a lookalike and has been claiming to be the famous singer.

The film was the third of Fulci's musical films and feature Celentano. It grossed a total of 87 million Italian lire on its domestic release in Italy.

== Cast ==
- Adriano Celentano as himself and Peppino
- Claudia Mori as Carmelina
- Donatella Turi as Manuela Mazzolani
- Luigi Pavese as Mazzolani
- Carlo Campanini as a monk
- Giacomo Furia as a hotel manager

== Production ==
Uno strano tipo was an Italian production from Giovanni Addessi Produzione Cinematografica S.p.A.. The film was shot in Amalfi. Like Fulci's earlier films Ragazzi del Juke-Box (1959) and Urlatori alla sbarra (1960), Uno strano tipo was a musicarello. The musicarello was a short-lived cycle of musical films produced primarily between 1958 and 1971, which were primarily targeted to audiences in their late teens and early 20s.

Adriano Celentano performs in the film, as he had for Fulci's previous films Ragazzi del Juke-Box and Urlatori alla sbarra. Celentano performs as himself and a buffonnish double in the film. On set, Celentano met Claudia Mori and were married the next year.

== Release ==
Uno strano tipo was released in Bari, Italy on March 6, 1963. It was next shown at the Bordighera Festival Internazionale del Film Comico e Umoristico, which ran from March 10 to 19 in 1963. It was later released in Turin on April 4 and Rome on July 27, 1963. It grossed a total of 87 million Italian lire domestically in Italy.

It was released in the United States in Chicago on May 18, 1965, and Philadelphia on October 3, 1965. It was shown at two cinemas that specialized in films for Italian-American audiences.
