= Love and Marriage (film) =

- Directed by: Gianni Puccini; Mino Guerrini
- Written by: Bruno Baratti; Oreste Biancoli
- Starring: Lando Buzzanca; Sylva Koscina; Eleonora Rossi Drago; Ingeborg Schöner
- Cinematography: Alfio Contini; Riccardo Pallottini; Luciano Trasatti
- Edited by: Mario Forges Davanzati; Bruna Malaguti; Ornella Micheli
- Music by: Marcello Giombini
- Release date: 1964
- Country: Italy
- Language: Italian

Love and Marriage (Italian: L'idea fissa) is a 1964 Italian anthology comedy film directed by Gianni Puccini and Mino Guerrini.

== Plot ==
=== The first night ===
A man "lends" his wife in exchange for a check.

=== Saturday 18 July ===
A wife manages to cheat on a very suspicious husband.

=== Just a moment ===
A man discovers that his wife is far from faithful as he believed.

=== The last card ===
A couple, in order not to give up their comforts, prostitute themselves.

== Cast ==
La prima notte

- Lando Buzzanca
- Maria Grazia Buccella
- Luciana Angiolillo
- Umberto D'Orsi

Sabato 18 luglio

- Sylva Koscina
- Philippe Leroy
- Roberto Fabbri
- Alrise Estense

Basta un attimo

- Ingeborg Schöner
- Renato Tagliani
- Marino Masé
- Stephen Forsyth
- Sandro Moretti

L'ultima carta

- Eleonora Rossi Drago
- Aldo Giuffrè
- Carlo Loffredo
- April Hennessy
- Ethel Levin
- Gioia Durel
- Bruno Scipioni
