= Avenger of the Seven Seas =

1962 film

Avenger of Seven Seas
- Directed by: Domenico Paolella
- Screenplay by: Ugo Guerra; Luciano Martino; Domenico Paolella; Ernesto Gastaldi
- Produced by: Gianni Hecht Lucari
- Starring: Richard Harrison; Michèle Mercier; Roldano Lupi
- Cinematography: Carlo Bellero
- Edited by: Otello Colangeli
- Music by: Egisto Macchi
- Production companies: Documento Film; Le Louvre Film
- Release date: 22 March 1962
- Running time: 90 minutes
- Countries: Italy; France

Avenger of the Seven Seas (Italian: Il giustiziere dei mari, French: Le Boucanier des îles), also known as The Executioner of the Seas, is a 1962 Italian epic adventure film directed by Domenico Paolella and starring Richard Harrison and Michèle Mercier.

== Summary ==
After being sentenced to death and pulling off a daring escape, David Robinson, a young heir from a noble English family, turns pirate. He decides to confront his former commander, seeking revenge for the unjust sentence by defeating him in battle.

== Cast ==
- Richard Harrison as David Robinson
- Michèle Mercier as Jennifer
- Roldano Lupi as Redway
- Marisa Belli as Nike
- Walter Barnes as Van Artz
- Paul Muller as Hornblut
- Carlo Hintermann as Errol Robinson

== Production ==
Avenger of the Seven Seas was co-production between Italy's Documento Film and France's Le Louvre Film.

== Release ==
Avenger of the Seven Seas was released on 22 March 1962.

== See also ==
- List of Italian films of 1962
- List of French films of 1962
