= The Prince in Chains =

- Directed by: Luis Lucia
- Written by: José Rodulfo Boeta; Pedro Calderón de la Barca (play); Javier Escrivá
- Produced by: Miguel A. Martin
- Cinematography: Alejandro Ulloa
- Music by: Cristóbal Halffter
- Production company: Europea de Cine
- Release date: 20 December 1960
- Running time: 100 minutes
- Countries: Spain; Italy
- Language: Spanish

The Prince in Chains (Spanish: El príncipe encadenado, Italian: Il principe dei vichinghi) aka King of the Vikings, is a 1960 Spanish-Italian historical adventure film directed by Luis Lucia. It based on the 17th-century play Life is a Dream.

The film's sets were designed by Sigfrido Burmann.

== Cast ==
In alphabetical order

- Anastasio Campoy
- Juan Cortés
- Alfonso de la Vega
- Javier Escrivá
- Margarita Laos
- Katia Loritz
- Javier Loyola
- María Mahor
- Ángel Menéndez
- Antonio Molino Rojo
- Luis Morris
- Paul Naschy as Mongol chief
- Pedro Osinaga
- Luis Prendes
- Antonio Queipo
- Luis Rico
- Lorenzo Robledo
- Pedro Rodríguez de Quevedo
- António Vilar

== Bibliography ==
- Bentley, Bernard. A Companion to Spanish Cinema. Boydell & Brewer, 2008.
