= The Third Eye (1966 film) =

- Italian film poster
- Directed by: Mino Guerrini
- Screenplay by: Piero Regnoli; Mino Guerrini
- Story by: Ermanno Donati
- Produced by: Ermanno Donati; Luigi Carpentieri
- Starring: Franco Nero; Gioia Pascal; Erika Blanc
- Cinematography: Alessandro D'Eva
- Edited by: Ornella Micheli
- Music by: Francesco De Masi
- Distributed by: Medusa
- Release date: 11 June 1966 (Italy)
- Running time: 90 minutes
- Country: Italy
- Box office: ₤72 million

The Third Eye (Italian: Il terzo occhio) is a 1966 Italian horror film. It was directed by Mino Guerrini and stars Franco Nero, Gioia Pascal, and Erika Blanc. A young count, who lives with his domineering, jealous mother, begins on a downward spiral into madness after his fiancée dies in a car accident. This was one of Franco Nero's earliest films, before he achieved stardom in the spaghetti western genre. Erika Blanc plays a dual role in the film, portraying both the Count's dead fiancée Laura, as well as Laura's twin sister Daniela.

Joe D'Amato remade the film as 1979's Beyond the Darkness.

== Plot ==
Mino, a wealthy count/taxidermist living under the thumb of his domineering mother, decides to marry his fiancée Laura, a decision that infuriates not only his jealous mother, but their plotting maid Marta, who has desires of marrying the count someday herself. Before Laura goes out for a drive, Marta sabotages her car's brakes and the poor woman is killed when her car plunges off a cliff. Mino, who has been following Laura in his car, witnesses the accident. He retrieves his fiancée’s body from the wreckage and leaves the car submerged in a lake. Meanwhile, Mino’s mother catches Marta trying on a wedding dress and dismisses her, striking her repeatedly with her walking stick. In the struggle, she loses her footing and falls down the stairs. Marta strangles her. Mino takes Laura’s body back to the villa and preserves it in his taxidermy laboratory, stuffing her as he would one of his birds, before placing her in their marital bed.

Soon after, Mino begins bringing prostitutes to his mansion, where he has sex with them in the same bed in which he keeps his fiancée's stuffed corpse. When the girls see the body and begin screaming, he strangles them to death. Marta discovers the murders and offers to help him dispose of the bodies in acid, if he agrees to marry her and make her the countess. Everything seems to be going her way until Laura's twin sister Daniela shows up at the estate, trying to find out if her sister's body was ever dredged out of the lake by the police. When Mino sees Daniela, his mind snaps and he thinks it is Laura, returned from the dead. He breaks his deal with Marta and tells her to pack her bags and leave the mansion, so that he and Daniela can be married. Marta tries to stab Daniela that night with a huge butcher knife, but Mino intervenes and stabs Marta repeatedly in a gruesome scene that is heavily edited in the Italian release prints. Leaving Marta for dead, Mino kidnaps Daniela and drives out into the country with her, ranting like a lunatic as they drive. But Marta's not dead, and she manages to drag her blood-spattered body to the phone to call the authorities. Before she dies, she alerts the police to the kidnapping, and a manhunt begins to capture Mino before he can harm Daniela.

== Cast ==
- Franco Nero as Mino
- Gioia Pascal as Marta
- Erika Blanc as Laura / Daniela
- Olga Solbelli as Mino's Mother
- Marina Morgan as Woman In The Nightclub

== Production ==
The story of the film came from producer Ermanno Donati who is credited under the pen name Phil Young. The film's credits state the plot is based on famed serial killer Gilles de Rais but this is fictional. The film was originally titled Il freddo bacio della morte (lit. 'The Cold Kiss of Death'), a title that appeared on the French release prints only. It went into production in June 1965. The film was shot at the Villa Parisi.

== Release ==
The Third Eye came into trouble with censors in Italy on its release. On 28 February 1966, the film was rejected as it was considered to be "contrary to the public moral". The rejection also noted that "In addition many scenes of almost full female nudity and excessively graphic intercourses, the film features episodes of necrophilia, close-ups of horrific scenes with blood and brutal violence, presented with real sadism and a protracted insistence which conveys a sense of complacency by part of the makers". The film was later distributed in Italy by Medusa and released on 11 June 1966. It grossed a total of 72 million Italian lire.

== See also ==
- List of horror films of 1966
- List of Italian films of 1966
