= Maciste in King Solomon's Mines =

Samson in King Solomon's Mines
- Film poster
- Directed by: Piero Regnoli
- Screenplay by: Piero Regnoli
- Produced by: Luigi Carpentieri; Ermanno Donati
- Starring: Reg Park; Wandisa Guida; Bruno Piergentili
- Cinematography: Mario Capriotti; Luciano Trasatti
- Edited by: Ornella Michelli
- Music by: Francesco De Masi
- Production company: Panda Societa per L'Industria Cinematografica
- Release date: 25 June 1964 (Italy)
- Running time: 92 minutes
- Country: Italy

Samson in King Solomon's Mines (Italian: Maciste nelle miniere de re Salomone) is a 1964 Italian peplum film written and directed by Piero Regnoli.

== Cast ==
- Reg Park as Maciste
- Wandisa Guida as Fazira
- Dan Harrison as Abucar
- Giuseppe Addobbati as Namar
- Eleonora Bianchi as Samara
- Elio Jotta as Riad
- Carlo Tamberlani as Zelea
- Bruno Scipioni as Kadar

== Production ==
Samson in King Solomon's Mines was produced by Italy's Panda Societa per L'Industria Cinematografica and filmed at Incir De Paolis Studios in Rome. The film had some location shooting done in South Africa for the wildlife scenes.

== Release ==
Samson in King Solomon's Mines was released in Italy on 25 June 1964.
