= Women of Devil's Island =

- Directed by: Domenico Paolella
- Written by: Domenico Paolella
- Produced by: Gianni Hecht Lucari
- Starring: Guy Madison; Michèle Mercier
- Cinematography: Carlo Bellero
- Music by: Egisto Macchi
- Release date: 1962
- Language: Italian

Women of Devil's Island (Italian: Le prigioniere dell'isola del diavolo, French: L'île aux filles perdues) is a 1962 Italian-French adventure-drama film written and directed by Domenico Paolella and starring Guy Madison and Michèle Mercier.

== Plot ==
In the late 18th century, a group of French female convicts - among them streetwalkers, murderers, and revolutionaries - are shipped to Devil's Island penal colony. They join the other female convicts already on the island and are forced by the cruel Lefèvre and his abusive guards to pan gold for the French king Louis XVI and his Austrian queen Marie Antoinette.

Lefèvre hopes for a promotion, but a new prison governor arrives with a letter from the king and takes command, also putting in place a more humane prison regiment for the women. In reality, the letter is a fake. He is the revolutionary Henri Vallière and in league with the pirates, who in a daring coup help him steal the gold and overturn Lefèvre's rule.

== Cast ==
- Guy Madison as Henri Vallière
- Michèle Mercier as Martine Foucher
- Federica Ranchi as Jeanette
- Marisa Belli as Melina
- Paul Muller as Lefèvre
- Tullio Altamura as Dubois
- Antonella Della Porta as Louise
- Carlo Hintermann as Capt. Duval
- Gisella Arden as Maeva
- Fernando Piazza as Michael
- Margaret Rose Keil as Rosy
- Claudine Damon as Pauline
- Roldano Lupi

== Release ==
On DVD, the film has been released in the United States by Mill Creek Entertainment on 7 February 2006 as part of the "Drive-In Movie Classics 50 Movie Pack", and in Germany under the title Frauen für die Teufelsinsel in a licensed limited edition with German and English audio.
