= Marco Polo (1962 film) =

- Directed by: Piero Pierotti
- Screenplay by: Oreste Biancoli; Ennio De Concini; Eliana De Sabata; Antoinette Pellevant; Piero Pierotti; Duccio Tessari
- Produced by: Luigi Carpentieri′; Ermanno Donati
- Starring: Rory Calhoun; Yoko Tanikol; Camillo Pilotto; Pierre Cressoy
- Cinematography: Ricardo Pallottini
- Edited by: Ornella Micheli
- Music by: Angelo Francisco Lavagnino
- Production companies: Alta Vista Filmorsa; Panda Film
- Release dates: 21 June 1962 (Italy); 17 May 1963 (France)
- Running time: 95 min
- Countries: Italy; France
- Budget: $4 million

Marco Polo (Italian: L'avventura di un italiano in Cina) is a 1962 historical action adventure film directed by Piero Pierotti. The American English-dubbed version includes scenes directed by Hugo Fregonese and a new score by Les Baxter.

== Cast ==
- Rory Calhoun as Marco Polo
- Yoko Tani as Princess Amurroy
- Camillo Pilotto as Grand Khan
- Pierre Cressoy as Cuday
- Michael Chow as Ciu-Lin
- Tiny Yong as Tai-Au (credited as Thien-Huong)
- Franco Ressel

== Release ==
Marco Polo was released in Italy on 21 June 1962, in the United States in August 1962 and in France on 17 May 1963.

== Reception ==
In a contemporary review for The New York Times upon the film's American release, critic Eugene Archer wrote: "Rory Calhoun, playing the title role of 'Marco Polo' in doublet and tights, is as dauntlessly American as Gary Cooper, who acted the role in an equally foolish Hollywood version a couple of decades ago. ... Under Hugo Fregonese's passable direction, the swashbuckling saga from American International is predictably juvenile, colorful and harmless. As usual, any resemblance between the dubbed sound track and the events pictured on the screen is purely coincidental."

== Comic book adaption ==
- Charlton Comics: Marco Polo (1962)
