= Ermanno Donati =

Italian film producer

Ermanno Donati was an Italian film producer. Along with Luigi Carpentieri, Donati won the Nastro d'Argento award for Best Producer for the film The Day of the Owl.

== Selected filmography ==
=== As producer ===
- I Vampiri (1957)
- The Son of the Red Corsair (1959)
- Winter Holidays (1959)
- Atlas Against the Cyclops (1961)
- Samson and the Seven Miracles of the World (1961)
- The Witch's Curse (1962)
- Marco Polo (1962)
- The Horrible Dr. Hichcock (1962)
- Le massaggiatrici (1962)
- The Ghost (1963)
- The Magnificent Adventurer (1963)
- Samson in King Solomon's Mines (1964)
- The Third Eye (1966)
- The Hills Run Red (1966)
- Navajo Joe (1966)
- Col cuore in gola (1967).
- The Day of the Owl (1968)
- Salon Kitty (1976)
- Beyond the Darkness (1979)
