= The Avenger of Venice =

1964 film

- Directed by: Carlo Campogalliani; Piero Pierotti
- Screenplay by: Oreste Biancoli; Gian Paolo Callegari; Piero Pierotti; Manuel Pilares; Duccio Tessari
- Based on: A novel by Michel Zevaco
- Starring: Brett Halsey; Gianna Maria Canale; Burt Nelson; Conrado San Martín; Vira Silenti
- Cinematography: Rafael Pacheco; Luciano Trasatti
- Music by: Angelo Francesco Lavagnino
- Production companies: Panda Cinematografica; Estela Films
- Release date: 16 March 1964
- Running time: 91 minutes
- Countries: Italy; Spain

The Avenger of Venice (Italian: Il ponte dei sospiri, Spanish: El puente de los suspiros) is a 1964 adventure film written and directed by Piero Pierotti and Carlo Campogalliani and starring Brett Halsey and Gianna Maria Canale. It is based on a novel by Michel Zevaco.

== Cast ==
- Brett Halsey as Rolando Candiano
- Gianna Maria Canale as Imperia
- Burt Nelson as Scalabrino
- Conrado San Martín as Captain Altieri
- Vira Silenti as Leonora
- José Marco Davó as Bembo Altieri
- José Nieto as Dandolo
- Perla Cristal as Juana
- Jean Murat as Candiano
- Paolo Gozlino as Captain Lorenzi
- Nino Persello
- Andrea Bosic
- Nello Pazzafini

== Release ==
The Avenger of Venice was released on 16 March 1964.

== See also ==
- Sul ponte dei sospiri (1953)
