= List of Latin phrases (E) =

This page is one of a series listing English translations of notable Latin phrases, such as veni, vidi, vici and et cetera. Some of the phrases are themselves translations of Greek phrases, as ancient Greek rhetoric and literature started centuries before the beginning of Latin literature in ancient Rome.

Latin	Translation	Notes
e causa ignota	of unknown cause	Often used in medicine when the underlying disease causing a symptom is not known. See also idiopathic.
E pluribus unum	out of many, one	Literally, out of more (than one), one. The former national motto of the United States, which "In God We Trust" later replaced; therefore, it is still inscribed on many U.S. coins and on the U.S. Capitol. Also the motto of S.L. Benfica. Less commonly written as ex pluribus unum
ecce Agnus Dei	behold the lamb of God	John the Baptist exclaims this after seeing Jesus
ecce ancilla domini	behold the handmaiden of the Lord	From Luke 1:38 in the Vulgate Bible. Name of an 1850 oil painting by Dante Gabriel Rossetti and motto of Bishopslea Preparatory School.
ecce homo	behold the man	From the Gospel of John in the Vulgate 19:5 (Douay-Rheims), where Pontius Pilate speaks these words as he presents Jesus, crowned with thorns, to the crowd. It is also the title of Nietzsche's autobiography.
ecce panis angelorum	behold the bread of angels	From the Catholic hymn Lauda Sion; occasionally inscribed near the altar of Catholic churches; it refers to the Eucharist, the Bread of Heaven; the Body of Christ. See also: Panis angelicus.
editio princeps	first edition	The first published edition of a work.
Ego sum	I am	Phrase from the Gospel of John as a title of Jesus (based on the Koine Greek term ἐγώ εἰμι Ego eimi)
ego te absolvo	I absolve you	Part of the formula of Catholic sacramental absolution, i. e., spoken by a priest as part of the Sacrament of Penance (see also absolvo).
ego te provoco	I challenge you	Used as a challenge; "I dare you". Can also be written as te provoco.
eheu fugaces labuntur anni	Alas, the fleeting years slip by	From Horace's Odes, 2, 14
ejusdem generis	of the same kinds, class, or nature	From the canons of statutory interpretation in law. When more general descriptors follow a list of many specific descriptors, the otherwise wide meaning of the general descriptors is interpreted as restricted to the same class, if any, of the preceding specific descriptors.
Eligo in Summum Pontificem	I elect as Supreme Pontiff	The text printed on the ballots used by cardinals to vote for a new pope during a Conclave.
eluceat omnibus lux	let the light shine out from all	The motto of Sidwell Friends School
emeritus	veteran	Retired from office. Often used to denote an office held at the time of one's retirement, as an honorary title, e. g. professor emeritus and provost emeritus. Inclusion in one's title does not necessarily denote that the honorand is inactive in the pertinent office.
emollit mores nec sinit esse feros	a faithful study of the liberal arts humanizes character and permits it not to be cruel	From Ovid, Epistulae ex Ponto (II, 9, 48). Motto of University of South Carolina.
ens causa sui	existing because of oneself	Or "being one's own cause". Traditionally, a being that owes its existence to no other being, hence God or a Supreme Being (see also Primum Mobile).
ense petit placidam sub libertate quietem	by the sword she seeks a serene repose under liberty	Motto of the U.S. state of Massachusetts, adopted in 1775.
entia non sunt multiplicanda praeter necessitatem	entities must not be multiplied beyond necessity	Occam's razor or Law of Parsimony; arguments which do not introduce extraneous variables are to be preferred in logical argumentation.
entitas ipsa involvit aptitudinem ad extorquendum certum assensum	reality involves a power to compel certain assent	A phrase used in modern Western philosophy on the nature of truth.
eo ipso	by that very (act)	Technical term in philosophy and law. Similar to ipso facto. Example: "The fact that I am does not eo ipso mean that I think." From the Latin ablative form of id ipsum ("that thing itself").
eo nomine	by that name	
epicuri de grege porcum	A pig from the herd (or sty) of Epicurus	From Horace, Epistles
equo ne credite	do not trust the horse	From Virgil, Aeneid, II. 48–49; a reference to the Trojan Horse.
erga omnes	in relation to everyone	Used in law, especially international law, to denote a kind of universal obligation.
ergo	therefore	Denotes a logical conclusion (see also cogito ergo sum).
errantis voluntas nulla est	the will of a mistaken party is void	Roman legal principle formulated by Pomponius in the Digest of the Corpus Juris Civilis, stating that legal actions undertaken by man under the influence of error are invalid.
errare humanum est	to err is human	Sometimes attributed to Seneca the Younger, but not attested: Errare humanum est, perseverare autem diabolicum, et tertia non datur (To err is human; to persist [in committing such errors] is of the devil, and the third possibility is not given.) Several authors contemplated the idea before Seneca: Livy, Venia dignus error is humanus (Storie, VIII, 35) and Cicero: is Cuiusvis errare: insipientis nullius nisi, in errore perseverare (Anyone can err, but only the fool persists in his fault) (Philippicae, XII, 2, 5). Cicero, being well-versed in ancient Greek, may well have been alluding to Euripides' play Hippolytus some four centuries earlier. 300 years later Saint Augustine of Hippo recycled the idea in his Sermones, 164, 14: Humanum fuit errare, diabolicum est per animositatem in errore manere. The phrase gained currency in the English language after Alexander Pope's An Essay on Criticism of 1711: "To err is human, to forgive divine" (line 325).
erratum	error	I.e., mistake. Lists of errors in a previous edition of a work are often marked with the plural errata ("errors").
eruditio et religio	scholarship and duty	Motto of Duke University
esse est percipi	to be is to be perceived	Motto of George Berkeley for his subjective idealist philosophical position that nothing exists independently of its perception by a mind except minds themselves.
esse quam videri	to be, rather than to seem	Truly being a thing, rather than merely seeming to be a thing. The motto of many institutions. From Cicero, De amicitia (On Friendship), Chapter 26. Prior to Cicero, Sallust used the phrase in Bellum Catilinae, 54, 6, writing that Cato esse quam videri bonus malebat ("preferred to be good, rather than to seem so"). Earlier still, Aeschylus used a similar phrase in Seven Against Thebes, line 592: ou gar dokein aristos, all' enai thelei ("he wishes not to seem the best, but to be the best"). Motto of the State of North Carolina.
est modus in rebus	there is measure in things	there is a middle or mean in things, there is a middle way or position; from Horace, Satires 1.1.106; see also: Golden mean (philosophy). According to Potempski and Galmarini (Atmos. Chem. Phys., 9, 9471–9489, 2009) the sentence should be translated as: "There is an optimal condition in all things", which in the original text is followed by sunt certi denique fines quos ultra citraque nequit consistere rectum ("There are therefore precise boundaries beyond which one cannot find the right thing").
esto perpetua	may it be perpetual	Said of Venice, Italy, by the Venetian historian Fra Paolo Sarpi shortly before his death. Motto of the U.S. state of Idaho, adopted in 1867; of S. Thomas' College, Mount Lavinia, Sri Lanka; of Sigma Phi Society; of Main Street Hall, a dormitory at Phillips Exeter Academy.
esto quod es	be what you are	Motto of Wells Cathedral School
et adhuc sub iudice lis est	it is still before the court	From Horace, Ars Poetica (The Art of Poetry) 1.78.
et alibi (et al.)	and elsewhere	A less common variant on et cetera ("and the rest") used at the end of a list of locations to denote unenumerated/omitted ones.
et alii, et aliae, et alia (et al.)	and others	Used similarly to et cetera ("and the rest") to denote names that, usually for the sake of space, are unenumerated/omitted. Alii is masculine, and therefore it can be used to refer to men, or groups of men and women; the feminine et aliae is proper when the "others" are all female, but as with many loanwords, interlingual use, such as in reference lists, is often invariable. Et alia is neuter plural and thus in Latin text is properly used only for inanimate, genderless objects, but some use it as a gender-neutral alternative. APA style and MLA style uses et al. if the work cited was written by more than three authors; AMA style lists all authors if ≤6, and 3 + et al. if >6. AMA style forgoes the period (because it forgoes the period on abbreviations generally) and it forgoes the italic (as it does with other loanwords naturalized into scientific English); many journals that follow AMA style do likewise.
et cetera (etc., &c.)	and the rest	In modern usage, used to mean "and so on" or "and more".
et cum spiritu tuo	and with your spirit	The usual response to the phrase Dominus vobiscum used in Roman Catholic liturgy, for instance at several points during the Catholic Mass. Also used as a general form of greeting among and towards members of Catholic organisations.
et facere et pati fortia Romanum est	Acting and suffering bravely is the attribute of a Roman	The words of Gaius Mucius Scaevola when Lars Porsena captured him
et facta est lux	And light came to be or was made	From Genesis, 1:3: "and there was light". Motto of Morehouse College in Atlanta, Georgia, United States. See also Fiat lux.
et hoc genus omne	and all that sort of thing	Abbreviated as e.h.g.o. or ehgo
et in Arcadia ego	and in Arcadia [am] I / I [am/exist] even in Arcadia	Phrased from the perspective of the personification of death to indicate death's reality under even the most blissful of circumstances, associated in classical times with the then-pastoral Arcadia region of the Peloponnese in Greece; see also memento mori; also the name of paintings and TV episodes – see Et in Arcadia ego (disambiguation).
et lux in tenebris lucet	and light shines in the darkness	From the Gospel of John 1.5, Vulgate. Motto of the Pontifical Catholic University of Peru. See also Lux in Tenebris, 1919 play by Bertolt Brecht.
et nunc reges intelligite erudimini qui judicatis terram	"And now, O ye kings, understand: receive instruction, you that judge the earth."	From the Book of Psalms, II.x. (Vulgate), 2.10 (Douay-Rheims).
et passim (et pass.)	and throughout	Used in citations after a page number to indicate that there is further information in other locations in the cited resource. See also passim.
et sequentes (et seq.)	and the following (masculine/feminine plural)	Also et sequentia ("and the following things": neut.), abbreviations: et seqq., et seq., or sqq. Commonly used in legal citations to refer to statutes that comprise several sequential sections of a code of statutes (e. g. National Labor Relations Act, 29 U.S.C. § 159 et seq.; New Jersey Prevention of Domestic Violence Act, N.J. Stat. Ann. § 2C:25-17 et seq.).
et suppositio nil ponit in esse	and a supposition puts nothing in being	More usually translated as "Sayin' it don't make it so".
Et tu, Brute?	And you, Brutus?	Or "Even you, Brutus?" or "You too, Brutus?" Indicates betrayal by an intimate associate. From William Shakespeare, Julius Caesar, based on the traditional dying words of Julius Caesar. However, these were almost certainly not Caesar's true last words: Plutarch quotes Caesar as saying in Greek, the language of the Roman elite at the time, καὶ σὺ τέκνον (Kaì sù téknon?), translated as "You too, (my) child?", quoting from Menander.
et uxor (et ux.)	and wife	A legal term.
et vir	and husband	A legal term.
Etiam si omnes, ego non	Even if all others, I will never	Saint Peter to Jesus, from the Vulgate, Gospel of Matthew 26:33; New King James Version: Matthew 26:33).
etsi deus non daretur	even if God were not a given	This sentence synthesizes a famous concept of Hugo Grotius (1625).
evoles ut ira breve nefas sit; regna	arise, that your anger may [only] be a brief evil; control [it]	A bilingual palindrome, yielding its English paraphrase, "Anger, 'tis safe never. Bar it! Use love!"
ex abundanti cautela	out of an abundance of caution	In law, describes someone taking precautions against a very remote contingency. "One might wear a belt in addition to braces ex abundanti cautela". In banking, a loan in which the collateral is more than the loan itself. Also the basis for the term "an abundance of caution" employed by United States President Barack Obama to explain why the Chief Justice of the US Supreme Court John Roberts had to re-administer the presidential oath of office, and again in reference to terrorist threats.
ex abundantia enim cordis os loquitur	for out of the abundance of the heart the mouth speaketh.	From the Gospel of Matthew, XII.xxxiv (Vulgate), 12.34 (Douay-Rheims) and the Gospel of Luke, VI.xlv (Vulgate), 6.45 (Douay-Rheims). Sometimes rendered without enim ("for").
ex aequo	from the equal	Denoting "on equal footing", i. e., in a tie. Used for those two (seldom more) participants of a competition who demonstrated identical performance.
ex Africa semper aliquid novi	"(There is) always something new (coming) out of Africa"	Pliny the Elder, Naturalis Historia, 8, 42 (unde etiam vulgare Graeciae dictum semper aliquid novi Africam adferre), a translation of the Greek «Ἀεὶ Λιβύη φέρει τι καινόν».
ex amicitia pax	peace from friendship	Often used on internal diplomatic event invitations. A motto sometimes inscribed on flags and mission plaques of diplomatic corps.
ex animo	from the soul	Sincerely.
ex ante	from before	Denoting "beforehand", "before the event", or "based on prior assumptions"; denoting a prediction.
Ex Astris Scientia	From the Stars, Knowledge	The motto of the fictional Starfleet Academy of Star Trek. Adapted from ex luna scientia, which in turn derived from ex scientia tridens.
ex cathedra	from the chair	A phrase applied to the declarations or promulgations of the Catholic Supreme Pontiff (Pope) when, preserved from the possibility of error by the Holy Spirit (see Papal infallibility), he solemnly declares or promulgates ("from the chair" that was the ancient symbol of the teacher and governor, in this case of the Church) a dogmatic doctrine on faith or morals as being contained in divine revelation, or at least being intimately connected to divine revelation. Used, by extension, of anyone who is perceived as speaking as though with supreme authority.
ex cultu robur	from culture [comes] strength	The motto of Cranleigh School, Surrey.
ex debito Justitia	justice, which cannot be denied	on King's writ, to be granted to the subject
ex Deo	from God	
ex dolo malo	from fraud	"From harmful deceit"; dolus malus is the Latin legal term denoting "fraud". The full legal phrase is ex dolo malo non oritur actio ("an action does not arise from fraud"). When an action has its origin in fraud or deceit, it cannot be supported; thus, a court of law will not assist a man who bases his course of action on an immoral or illegal act.
ex duris gloria	From suffering [comes] glory	Motto of Rapha Cycling club (see also Rapha (sportswear))
ex facie	from the face	Idiomatically rendered "on the face of it". A legal term typically used to state that a document's explicit terms are defective absent further investigation. Also, "contempt ex facie" means contempt of court committed outside of the court, as contrasted with contempt in facie.
ex factis jus oritur	the law arises from the facts	
ex fide fiducia	from faith [comes] confidence	Motto of St George's College, Harare and Hartmann House Preparatory School
ex fide fortis	from faith [comes] strength	Motto of Loyola School in New York City, New York, United States.
ex glande quercus	from the acorn the oak	Motto of the Municipal Borough of Southgate, London, England, United Kingdom.
ex gratia	from kindness	More literally "from grace". Refers to someone voluntarily performing an act purely from kindness, as opposed to for personal gain or from being compelled to do it. In law, an ex gratia payment is one made without recognizing any liability or obligation.
ex hypothesi	from the hypothesis	Denoting "by hypothesis"
ex ignorantia ad sapientiam; ex luce ad tenebras (e.i.)	from ignorance into wisdom; from light into darkness	Motto of the fictional Miskatonic University in Arkham, Massachusetts, from the Cthulhu Mythos
ex infra (e.i.)	"from below"	Recent academic notation denoting "from below in this writing".
ex injuria jus non oritur	law does not arise from injustice	a doctrine in international law where territorial changes arising from conquest are deemed illegal
ex juvantibus	from that which helps	The medical pitfall in which response to a therapeutic regimen substitutes proper diagnosis.
ex lege	from the law	
ex libris	from the books	Precedes a person's name, denoting "from the library of" the nominate; also a synonym for "bookplate".
ex luna scientia	from the moon, knowledge	The motto of the Apollo 13 lunar mission, derived from ex scientia tridens, the motto of Jim Lovell's alma mater, the United States Naval Academy
ex malo bonum	good out of evil	From Saint Augustine of Hippo, "Sermon LXI", in which he contradicts the dictum of Seneca the Younger in Epistulae morales ad Lucilium, 87:22: bonum ex malo non fit ("good does not come from evil"). Also the alias of the song "Miserabile Visu" by Anberlin in the album New Surrender.
ex mea sententia	in my opinion	
ex merito Justitiae	from merit, justice / justice from merit	The measure of justice is from the merit of the deed.
ex mero motu	out of mere impulse, or of one's own accord	
ex nihilo nihil fit	nothing comes from nothing	From Lucretius, and said earlier by Parmenides; in conjunction with "creation": creatio ex nihilo – "creation out of nothing"
ex novo	anew	something that has been newly made or made from scratch (see also de novo)
Ex Oblivione	from oblivion	The title of a short story by H. P. Lovecraft
ex officio	from the office	By virtue or right of office. Often used when someone holds one office by virtue of holding another: for example, the President of France is an ex officio Co-Prince of Andorra. A common misconception is that all ex officio members of a committee or congress may not vote; but in some cases they do. In law ex officio can also refer to an administrative or judicial office taking action of its own accord; in the latter case the more common term is ex proprio motu or ex meru motu, for example to invalidate a patent or prosecute infringers of copyright.
ex opere operantis	from the work of the one working	Theological phrase contrasted with ex opere operato, referring to the notion that the validity or promised benefit of a sacrament depends on the person administering it
ex opere operato	from the work worked	A theological phrase meaning that the act of receiving a sacrament actually confers the promised benefit, such as a baptism actually and literally cleansing one's sins. The Catholic Church affirms that the source of grace is God, not just the actions or disposition of the minister or the recipient of the sacrament.
ex oriente lux	light from the east	Originally refers to the sun rising in the east, but alludes to culture coming from the Eastern world. Motto of several institutions.
ex oriente pax	peace comes from the east (i.e. from the Soviet Union)	Shown on the logo as used by East Germany's CDU, a blue flag with two yellow stripes, a dove, and the CDU symbol in the center with the words ex oriente pax.
ex parte	from a part	A legal term that means "by one party" or "for one party". Thus, on behalf of one side or party only.
ex pede Herculem	from his foot, so Hercules	From the measure of Hercules' foot you shall know his size; from a part, the whole.
ex post	from after	"Afterward", "after the event". Based on knowledge of the past. Measure of past performance
ex post facto	from a thing done afterward	Said of a law with retroactive effect
ex professo	from one declaring [an art or science]	Or 'with due competence'. Said of the person who perfectly knows his art or science. Also used to mean "expressly".
ex proprio vigore	on its own	legal phrase; also in Insular Cases and elsewhere with the 'ex'.
ex rel., or, ex relatio	[arising] out of the relation/narration [of the relator]	The term is a legal phrase; the legal citation guide called the Bluebook describes ex rel. as a "procedural phrase" and requires using it to abbreviate "on the relation of", "for the use of", "on behalf of", and similar expressions. An example of use is in court case titles such as Universal Health Services, Inc. v. United States ex rel. Escobar.
ex scientia tridens	from knowledge, sea power	The United States Naval Academy motto. Refers to knowledge bringing men power over the sea comparable to that of the trident-bearing Greek god Poseidon.
ex scientia vera	from knowledge, truth	The motto of the College of Graduate Studies at Middle Tennessee State University.
ex silentio	from silence	In general, the claim that the absence of something demonstrates the proof of a proposition. An argumentum ex silentio ("argument from silence") is an argument based on the assumption that someone's silence on a matter suggests ("proves" when a logical fallacy) that person's ignorance of the matter or their inability to counterargue validly.
ex situ	out of position	opposite of "in situ"
ex solo ad solem	from the Earth to the Sun	The motto of the University of Central Lancashire, Preston
ex supra (e.s.)	"from above"	Recent academic notation for "from above in this writing".
ex tempore	from [this moment of] time	"This instant", "right away" or "immediately". Also written extempore
Ex turpi causa non oritur actio	From a dishonorable cause an action does not arise	A legal doctrine which states that a claimant will be unable to pursue a cause of action if it arises in connection with his own illegal act. Particularly relevant in the law of contract, tort and trusts.
ex umbra in solem	from the shadow into the light	Motto of Federico Santa María Technical University
ex undis	from the waves [of the sea]	motto in the coat of arms of Eemsmond
Ex Unitate Vires	from unity, strength / union is strength / unity is strength	Former motto of South Africa
ex vi termini	from the force of the term	Thus, "by definition"
ex vita discedo, tanquam ex hospitio, non tanquam ex domo	I depart from life as from an inn, not as from home	Cicero, Cato Maior de Senectute (On Old Age) 23
ex vivo	out of or from life	Used in reference to the study or assay of living tissue in an artificial environment outside the living organism.
ex voto	from the vow	Thus, in accordance with a promise. An ex voto is also an offering made in fulfillment of a vow.
ex vulgus scientia	from the crowd, knowledge	used to describe social computing, in The Wisdom of Crowds and discourse referring to it.
excelsior	higher	"Ever upward!" The state motto of New York. Also a catchphrase used by Marvel Comics head Stan Lee.
exceptio firmat (or probat) regulam in casibus non exceptis	The exception confirms the rule in cases which are not excepted	A juridical principle which means that the statement of a rule's exception (e.g., "no parking on Sundays") implicitly confirms the rule (i.e., that parking is allowed Monday through Saturday). Often mistranslated as "the exception that proves the rule".
excusatio non petita accusatio manifesta	an excuse that has not been sought [is] an obvious accusation	More loosely, "he who excuses himself, accuses himself"—an unprovoked excuse is a sign of guilt. In French, qui s'excuse, s'accuse
exeat	s/he may go out	A formal leave of absence
exegi monumentum aere perennius	I have reared a monument more enduring than bronze	Horace, Carmina III:XXX:I
exempli gratia (e.g.)	for example, for the sake of example	"For example" or "for the sake of example". The abbreviation "e.g." is often interpreted (Anglicised) as "example given". The plural exemplōrum gratiā to refer to multiple examples, separated by commas, is now not in frequent use.
exemplum virtutis	a model of virtue	
exercitus sine duce corpus est sine spiritu	an army without a leader is a body without a spirit	On a plaque at the former military staff building of the Swedish Armed Forces
exeunt	they leave	Third-person plural present active indicative of the Latin verb exire; also seen in exeunt omnes, "all leave"; singular: exit. Typically used as a stage direction in plays which means that one or more actors should leave the stage.
experientia docet	experience teaches	This term has been used in dermatopathology to express that there is no substitute for experience in dealing with all the numerous variations that may occur with skin conditions. The term has also been used in gastroenterology. It is also the motto of San Francisco State University.
experimentum crucis	experiment of the cross	Or "crucial experiment". A decisive test of a scientific theory.
experto crede	trust the expert	Literally "believe one who has had experience". An author's aside to the reader.
expressio unius est exclusio alterius	the expression of the one is the exclusion of the other	"Mentioning one thing may exclude another thing". A principle of legal statutory interpretation: the explicit presence of a thing implies intention to exclude others; e.g., a reference in the Poor Relief Act 1601 to "lands, houses, tithes and coal mines" was held to exclude mines other than coal mines. Sometimes expressed as expressum facit cessare tacitum (broadly, "the expression of one thing excludes the implication of something else").
extra domum	[placed] outside of the house	Refers to a possible result of Catholic ecclesiastical legal proceedings when the culprit is removed from being part of a group like a monastery.
extra Ecclesiam nulla salus	outside the Church [there is] no salvation	This expression comes from the Epistle to Jubaianus, paragraph 21, written by Saint Cyprian of Carthage, a bishop of the third century. It is often used to summarise the doctrine that the Catholic Church is absolutely necessary for salvation.
extra omnes	outside, all [of you]	It is issued by the Master of the Papal Liturgical Celebrations before a session of the papal conclave which will elect a new pope. When spoken, all those who are not cardinals, or those otherwise mandated to be present at the conclave, must leave the Sistine Chapel.
extra territorium jus dicenti impune non paretur	he who administers justice outside of his territory is disobeyed with impunity	Refers to extraterritorial jurisdiction. Often cited in law of the sea cases on the high seas.
extrema ratio	extreme solution	last possibility, last possible course of action
