= Il trionfo di Clelia (Mysliveček) =

Opera by Josef Mysliveček

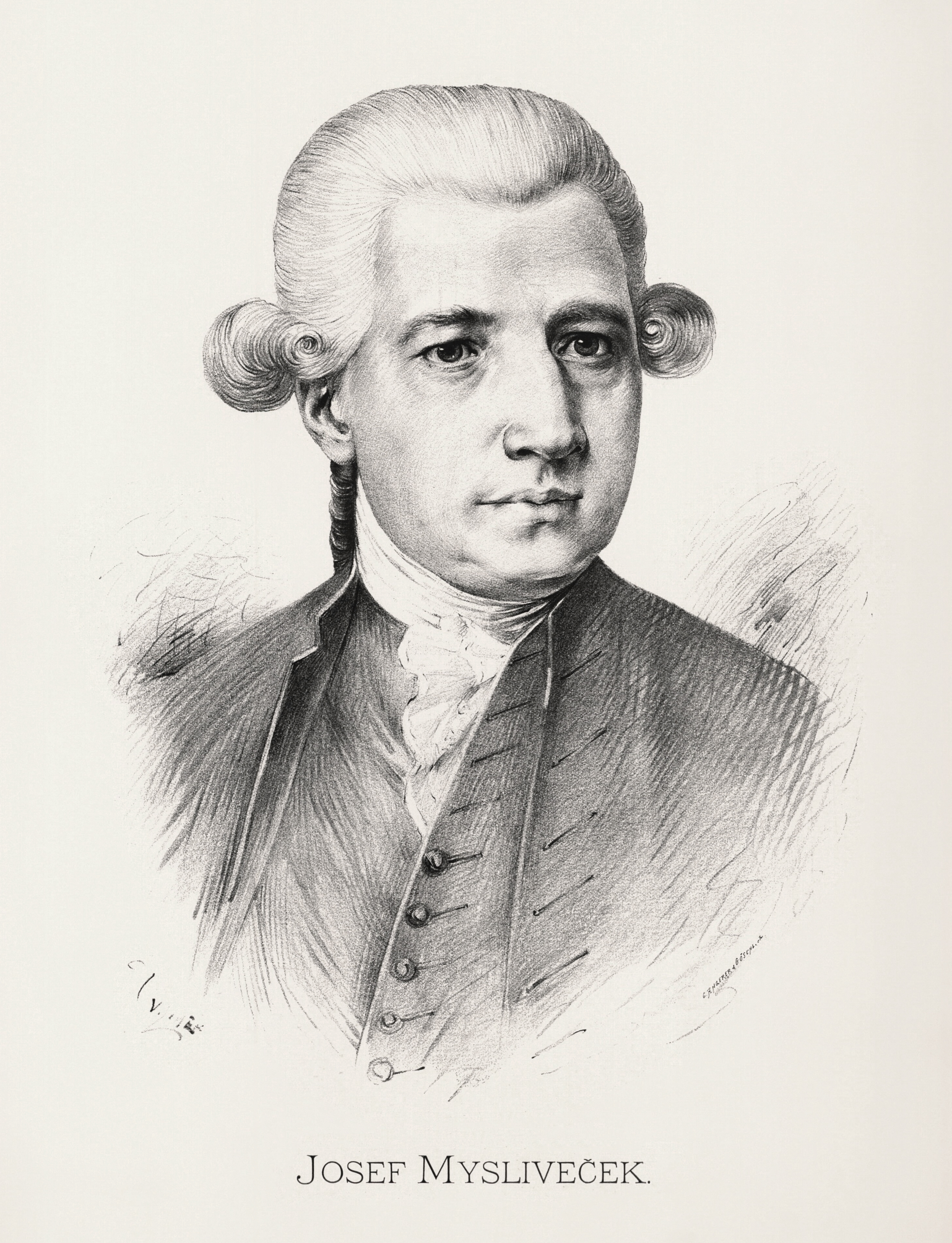
Josef Mysliveček

Il trionfo di Clelia ("The Triumph of Clelia") is an 18th-century Italian opera in three acts by the Czech composer Josef Mysliveček composed to a libretto by the Italian poet Metastasio for a production mounted in Turin during the carnival operatic season of 1768. It was common in the 1760s for composers to set Metastasian texts written decades earlier, but the text for Il trionfo di Clelia, first produced in Vienna in 1762 with music by Johann Adolf Hasse, was almost new when Mysliveček was commissioned to compose his setting. Exceptionally among the Mysliveček operas set to pre-existing Metastasian librettos, all of the aria texts used for his setting derive from the original without any substitutions. An advantage of using such a recent Metastasian libretto would have been no need to alter the original to accommodate an abbreviated third act such as was common in Metastasian adaptations of the 1760s. This opera (with all the rest of Mysliveček's operas) belongs to the serious type in Italian language referred to as opera seria that would usually feature the designation dramma per musica in librettos.

Metastasio's libretto was also set by Gluck and others, principally Ferdinando Bertoni, Niccolò Jommelli, Angelo Tarchi, and Marcos Portugal.

== Performance history ==
The opera was first performed at the Teatro Regio in Turin on 26 December 1767 at the beginning of the 1768 carnival operatic season. Opera productions at the royal court of Turin, which were sponsored only for the carnival season that took place at the beginning of each year, were famed for their lavish staging. Mysliveček's commission was the first after his overwhelming successes in Naples in the year 1767, particularly with Il Bellerofonte. He soon was given commissions from every major operatic center in Italy. The cast of the Turin production of Il trionfo di Clelia included the noted soprano Caterina Gabrielli, who had contributed enormously to the success of Il Bellerofonte in Naples. Francesca Gabrielli, probably her sister, also appeared in the Turin production along with the aging castrato Sebastiano Emiliani.

Mysliveček's opera Il trionfo di Clelia was never performed in Prague, but he clearly brought the music with him when he returned to Prague for a visit early in 1768, since arias from it were copied into ecclesiastical collections in Bohemia for decades after the 1760s. The same phenomenon is noticeable for arias from the operas Semiramide and Il Bellerofonte, works that were revived in Prague after the composer's return in 1768. The arias "Tempeste il mar" and "Non speri onusto il pino" were the ones most commonly tapped as sources for ecclesiastical adaptations.

== Roles ==
Roles	Voice type	Premiere cast, 26 December 1767 Teatro Regio, Turin Conductor: Paolo Domenico Canavasso
Porsenna, King of the Etruscans (referred to as "Tuscans" by Metastasio)	tenor	Gaetano Ottani
Clelia, a noble Roman virgin held hostage in the Tuscan (Etruscan) encampment, intended to be the bride of Orazio	soprano	Caterina Gabrielli
Orazio, a Roman envoy	soprano castrato	Luca Fabri
Larissa, daughter of Porsenna, secretly in love with Mannio, intended bride of Tarquinio	soprano	Francesca Gabrielli
Tarquinio, in love with Clelia	alto castrato	Sebastiano Emiliani
Mannio, a prince of the Veienti, in love with Larissa	soprano castrato	Filippo Lorenzini

== Synopsis ==
Metastasio’s plot for ‘’Il trionfo di Clelia’’ is based on incidents recorded by the ancient Roman historian Livy concerning the life of the last Roman king, Lucius Tarquinius Superbus, who was overthrown (according to tradition, in the year 509 BC) and exiled from Rome because of his tyrannical rule. Metastasio adapted accounts of the attempts of Lucius Tarquinius Superbus to regain the throne of Rome for his family by crafting a story about Tarquinius forming a military alliance with the Etruscan king Lars Porsena, named Porsenna by Metastasio. The connection is solidified by the engagement of Tarquinius’ son Titus Tarquinius to Porsenna's daughter Larissa (a pseudo-historical character). Hostilities lead to the Etruscans (referred to by Metastasio as Tuscans) laying siege to Rome. At the start of the opera, there is a temporary ceasefire guaranteed by the Roman hostage Clelia (Cloelia), a legendary figure who has traditionally been purported to be a contemporary of Lars Porsena. Clelia's Roman fiancé Orazio (Horatius Cocles) is also in the Tuscan camp to negotiate with Porsenna as an envoy. A genuine historical figure famous for his participation in a military engagement on the Sublicio Bridge in Rome that is depicted in Metastasio’s libretto, Horatius is never recorded in ancient historical accounts as having pursued a love affair with Cloelia.

Metastasio prefaced his libretto of 1762 with his own summary of the plot:

“Porsenna, king of the Tuscans, was determined to restore Titus Tarquinius, the last surviving son of Tarquinius Superbus, on the throne from which [his father] had been ousted. To this end, he raised a very powerful army to besiege Rome. The resolve of the frightened Romans and the particular bravery of the Roman hero Mucius Scaevola, which aroused the admiration of the Tuscan king, secured a few days of truce to allow for peace negotiations. However, to guarantee the truce, a condition was placed on the besieged to hand over a prescribed number of hostages. Among them was Cloelia, a most remarkable young Roman noblewoman. The deceitful acts of violence by Titus Tarquinius that Porsenna learned of, and the repeated proofs of bravery demonstrated by the Romans, inspired in Porsenna (as is common in great souls) contempt and disgust toward the one [Titus Tarquinius] and love and admiration toward the other [Cloelia]. Now that the king had finally heard of Cloelia’s more than manly courage, with which she crossed the Tiber (a deed that made Livy say she was braver than Scaevola and [Horatius] Cocles), all his admiration turned into a noble emulation of honor. He thought it would be a great injustice to deprive future generations of an exemplary figure that one could expect to be recorded by the earliest scholars of such a people: instead of vanquishing her as he had intended, Porsenna entered into the closest bonds of friendship and peace with her and let her enjoy the quiet possession of her hard-won freedom.”

Metastasio’s summary indicates that the character of Tarquinio in his libretto is not Lucius Tarquinius Superbus, the last king of Rome, as frequently claimed in the musicological literature, but rather Titus Tarquinius, his last surviving son at the time that he participated in an attempted invasion of Rome either in 499 or 496 BC. Metastasio’s Tarquinio never mentions occupying a royal throne of his own in the past, or of recovering one, only the ambition to seize one at the present time. Furthermore, the cast list for the original production of 1762 (besides the one printed for Mysliveček’s setting), never indicates that the character Tarquinio once possessed a ruler's title, as would be normal in a libretto of this era. A Tarquinio of roughly the same age as Porsenna’s daughter Larissa, with whom he is engaged, would also make much more sense than a fiancé who is a deposed king old enough to have an adult child about the same age as Larissa. Such an arrangement would not be compatible at all with the standards of 18th-century Italian opera seria, in which love affairs and marital engagements almost always involved two young adults of roughly the same age.

---Act I---

The opening is set in rooms of a royal palace in Rome from which the Tuscan army can be seen on the slopes of the occupied Janiculum hill

Clelia is sitting thoughtfully at a small table. She is horrified when she sees Tarquinio approach. Since she considers him an enemy, she feels her honor insulted by his visit. Despite his engagement to Larissa and her connection with Orazio, he declares his love to her and offers her marriage and the Roman throne. Clelia firmly refuses. When Larissa arrives, Tarquinio greets her with exaggerated kindness as his bride and walks away. Clelia then tells her about Tarquinio's proposal, and both complain about his wicked character. Larissa envies Clelia for her relationship with the Roman envoy Orazio, since she has to keep her own love for Mannio a secret. After she leaves, Orazio enters. Clelia also tells him about Tarquinio's advances and urges him to flee with her, because she no longer feels safe.

Orazio assures her of his love but also points out their mutual duties to their country. Clelia understands this. The arriving Mannio calls Orazio to see the king. When Clelia asks for his opinion on the negotiations, Mannio refers to Porsenna’s sense of justice, who unfortunately trusts Tarquinio. Clelia dismisses his fear that Larissa might support Tarquinio. Finally, Mannio admits that he himself is in love with Larissa. Clelia is confident that they can face the dangers.

A hallway attached to various apartments

The negotiations between Porsenna and Orazio begin. Porsenna hopes to be able to take Rome without bloodshed. Orazio points out the Romans' great love of freedom. They are glad to have shaken off the yoke of slavery under Tarquin. Porsenna, however, believes that their peoples should support each other and that freedom only plays a minor role. The negotiations finally end without any result and Porsenna leaves. Orazio is left alone briefly, then Tarquinio enters. To divert attention from his real plan, Tarquinio proposes to Orazio that he will give up his claim to the throne if Orazio lets him have Clelia. Despite worrying about Clelia, Orazio would actually be willing to do this. Tarquinio leaves and Clelia enters. When she arrives, Orazio tells her about the failed meeting with the king and vaguely hints at another possibility to end hostilities. However, he keeps Tarquinio's specific offer to himself.

---Act II---

A delightful intimate retreat inside the royal garden with statues and fountains

Alone, Tarquinio talks about how he has ordered his men to gather at a poorly guarded bridge to launch a surprise attack on Rome while the Romans are still waiting for the outcome of the negotiations. The messenger he has been impatiently waiting for finally appears and reports that everything is ready. Tarquinio sets off. Also alone, Orazio is still thinking about having to give up Clelia for the sake of Rome. She enters and reports Tarquinio’s treacherous attack on the city. Orazio now realizes how deceitful Tarquinio has been. He decides to return to Rome and take part in the defense. Meanwhile, Clelia is to inform Porsenna. They part from each other trustingly after singing a duet.

Ancient buildings on the bank of the Tiber occupied by the Tuscans, above which is the Sublicio Bridge that hides one of its ends on the left among the aforementioned old buildings and leaves the other end visible on the opposite bank of the river

Larissa complains to her father Porsenna about the forced engagement to the hated Tarquinio planned for her and tells him about her love for Mannio. They are interrupted by the excited Clelia, who reports Tarquinio's attack. Since she did not witness it herself, Porsenna does not believe her and withdraws. Speaking with Clelia, Larissa also does not think Tarquinio is capable of an arbitrary action such as this one. She accuses Clelia of thinking her father is the real instigator of the attack – but Mannio arrives and confirms the news of the attack from Tarquinio. Rome is already on the verge of defeat. Clelia sets off to be with her people. Larissa asks Mannio to follow her. She assures him that he is not indifferent to him but does not manage to make a real declaration of love. Left alone, Mannio expresses his disappointment at her apparent coldness.

The departing Mannio is seen fleeing towards Rome past the few guards one the bridge surprised by the arrival of the Tuscans, who slowly advance on the bridge from the left. Orazio, entering from the right on the abandoned bridge, moves forward Orazio appears and faces the Tuscans alone. During the fierce fight, some fall dead into the river. The Tuscans eventually retreat and leave the bridge free. Orazio orders his men to tear down the bridge while he holds the position. The fleeing Tuscans are stopped and sent back by Tarquinio. Orazio continues to defend the bridge until it finally collapses behind him. The Tuscans flee again. Clelia rushes to the victorious Orazio, but he dives into the Tiber in front of her eyes to reach the Roman side.

After his plan fails, Tarquinio has Porsenna convince everyone that the Romans are to blame for breaking the truce. Even though Clelia clearly shows her contempt for him ad takes her leave, he still loves her and decides to have her kidnapped. Due to time constraints (he is distracted by a need to lead his forces), he has to instruct his men to do it by sending them a letter.

---Act III---

Hanging gardens corresponding to Clelia's apartments, surrounded by railings and gates that close the only exit down to the Tiber, of which a large part can be seen. View of Rome on the opposite bank

Tarquinio's letter was intercepted by Mannio and delivered to Clelia by a messenger. Besides the abduction order, it contains evidence of Tarquinio's guilt in the attack. Clelia sets off to the king to inform him of this. Then she sees Tarquinio coming. Her only escape route is behind the grille on the Tiber’s shore, where Tarquinio's companions are waiting. Finally, she finds a horse and rides across the river to the other bank. Tarquinio and Larissa, approaching from the other side, are shocked.

A room in Porsenna’s palace

Porsenna still believes that Rome has broken the armistice. Tarquinio reinforces this opinion. Yet Porsenna is impressed by Orazio’s steadfastness and bravery. He decides to send his ships across the Tiber that night to attack in the morning. However, when Mannio reports the arrival of a Roman envoy, he postpones the attack again. Tarquinio loses hope.

A magnificent hall in the royal palace

The royal palace of Porsenna is waiting for the arrival of the envoy along with some nobles. Tarquinio informs him that it is the traitor Orazio himself. He appears with his entourage and asks Porsenna why the peace was broken. If Porsenna is the one responsible, Rome will resume the war. Otherwise, he demands the culprit be handed over. Porsenna is surprised because he had expected a defense instead of accusations. Orazio explains that he had been informed of the betrayal and was therefore able to act in time to prevent it. However, he cannot name the informant without committing perjury. He is ready to resume hostilities but demands the return of the hostage. Tarquinio points out that Clelia has already fled across the river. Porsenna and Orazio now decide to continue the war. After Orazio leaves, Tarquinio tries to stir up Porsenna against Rome even more. But Porsenna is no longer completely convinced of the Romans' guilt, since Orazio's behavior seemed sincere. Clelia arrives with some Romans. She informs Porsenna about Tarquinio's actions and his kidnap plot, and hands him the intercepted letter as proof. Tarquinio flees. Porsenna now declares himself overcome. He sends Clelia back to Rome to let the inhabitants know that from now on that they will have a friend and defender of their freedom in him. It might be possible to assert the likelihood of reconciliation and a marriage with Orazio, but this is not explicitly indicated in the libretto.

== Vocal numbers ==
- Act 1
  - Scene 2 – Aria of Tarquinio, "Sì, tacerò, se vuoi"
  - Scene 3 – Aria of Larissa, "Ah, celar la bella face"
  - Scene 5 – Aria of Orazio, "Resta, o cara"
  - Scene 7 – Aria of Clelia, "Mille dubbi me destano in petto"
  - Scene 8 – Aria of Porsenna, "Sai che piegar si vede"
  - Scene 10 – Accompanied recitative for Orazio, "Che crudel sacrifizio"
  - Scene 10 – Aria of Orazio, "Saper ti basti, o cara"
  - Scene 11 – Aria of Clelia, "Tempeste il mar"
- Act 2
  - Scene 1 – Accompanied recitative of Tarquinio, "Dei, scorre l'ora"
  - Scene 1 – Aria of Orazio, "Dei di Roma"
  - Scene 3 – Duet for Clelia and Orazio, "Sì, ti fido al tuo gran core"
  - Scene 5 – Aria of Porsenna, "Sol del Tebro"
  - Scene 8 – Aria of Larissa, "Dico che ingiusto sei"
  - Scene 9 – Aria of Mannio, "Vorrei che almen per gioco"
  - Scene 13 – Aria of Clelia, "Io nemica, a torto il dici"
  - Scene 14 – Accompanied recitative for Tarquinio, "Ma quel mai sì possente"
  - Scene 14 – Aria of Tarquinio, "Non speri onusto il pino"
- Act 3
  - Scene 1 – Aria of Clelia, "Tanto esposta alle sventure"
  - Scene 3 – Aria of Larissa, "Ah, ritorna età del oro"
  - Scene 5 – Aria of Porsenna, "Spesso, se ben l'affretta"
  - Scene 6 – Aria of Tarquinio, "In questa selva oscura"
  - Scene 8 – Aria of Orazio, "De' folgori di Giove"
  - Scene 10 – Chorus, "Oggi a te, gran re toscano"
