= Amazons of Rome =

1961 peplum film

- American film poster
- Directed by: Carlo Ludovico Bragaglia; Vittorio Cottafavi; Peter O'Cord
- Screenplay by: Leo Joannon; Pierre O'Connell
- Story by: Luigi Emmanuele; Gaetano Loffredo
- Starring: Louis Jourdan; Sylvia Syms; Jean Chevrier; Nicole Courcel; Ettore Manni
- Cinematography: Marc Fossard
- Edited by: Michael Leroy
- Production companies: Cine-Italian Film; Criterion Films; Regina Films
- Distributed by: United Artists
- Release date: 24 March 1961 (Italy)
- Running time: 105 minutes
- Countries: Italy; France

Amazons of Rome (Italian: Le vergini di Roma) is a 1961 peplum film. During production, tensions brewed between Louis Jourdan and director Vittorio Cottafavi which led to Cottafavi being replaced with Carlo Ludovico Bragaglia.

The film dealt with the legend of Cloelia which was also featured in Hero of Rome.

== Plot ==
In the year 476 BC the newly founded republic of Rome is at war with a coalition formed by Porcenna, king of Etrusca, and its allies Stavros (head of Greek mercenaries) and Drusco (chief of a Barbarian horde). After fierce fighting Drusco offers a truce but demands that the Romans offer hostages as a sign of good faith, including Clelia, the leader of a group of woman warriors.

Drusco is assigned to look after the women, and he falls for Cloelia. Lucilla, an Etruscan noblewoman who was captured by the Romans and then released, hates the Romans.

Cloelia and the women escape. Drusco is blamed. Cloelia leads the women back across the Tiber to help the Romans fight the Etruscans.

Soon the peace treaty is broken and the Roman army, under the command of Horatio Cocles (or "Cyclops", because he had lost an eye fighting when he was younger) prepare to make their last stand at the Sublicus Bridge over the River Tiber.

== Cast ==
- Louis Jourdan as Drusco
- Sylvia Syms as Cloelia
- Jean Chevrier as Porcenna, Etruscan leader
- Nicole Courcel as Lucilla, Porcenna's wife
- Ettore Manni as Horatius Cocles, Roman Consul
- Paola Falchi as Aurelia
- Renaud Mary as Stravos
- Michel Piccoli as Console Publicola
- Corrado Pani as Muzio Scevola
- Nicolas Vogel as Rasmal
- María Luisa Rolando as Donna Romana
- Carlo Giustini as Bruto
- Jacques Dufilho

== Production ==
In August 1960 Hedda Hopper announced Louis Jourdan would star in Virgins of Rome to be filmed in Rome. At one stage Monique van Vooren was originally announced as the female lead. By September Sylvia Syms and Belinda Lee were going to co-star. Only Syms appears in the final film. Jourdan's fee was reportedly $250,000.

Filming ended up taking place in Yugoslavia. Syms said "It's a sort of Western in Roman setting. I play a sort of Roman Annie Oakley - waving a spear and riding a horse."

Sylvia Syms said Louis Jourdan had "worn out" four directors because he wanted to play the movie as a light comedy rather than a fantasy. "I really can't say I blame Louis," said Syms. "After all, imagine him playing a savage barbarian. It's hilarious. But working for him is boring. That's the trouble with good looking men - they're not great on conversation." Syms said she took on her role "in a spirit of bravado" but she disliked the experience as conditions were primitive.

Syms says during filming she was pursued into her hotel room by one of the film's producers, but she was rescued by Jack Palance who was also making a movie in Yugoslavia.

== Release ==
Amazons of Rome was released in Italy on 24 March 1961 with a 105-minute running time. It was released in the United States in March 1963 with a 93-minute running time.

Filmink magazine wrote about the film, saying:

If it’s a little odd seeing Sylvia Syms in Ancient World garb, well, everyone was making peplums around this time (if Jeanne Crain could, why not her?) and it was one of her best parts, as Cloelia, the Roman woman of legend who leads troops across the Tiber. Syms is a lot more at home than co-star Louis Jourdan who plays an apple-chomping barbarian General and pretty much sinks the film single-handedly.
