= Il trionfo di Clelia (Gluck) =

1763 opera by Christoph Willibald Gluck

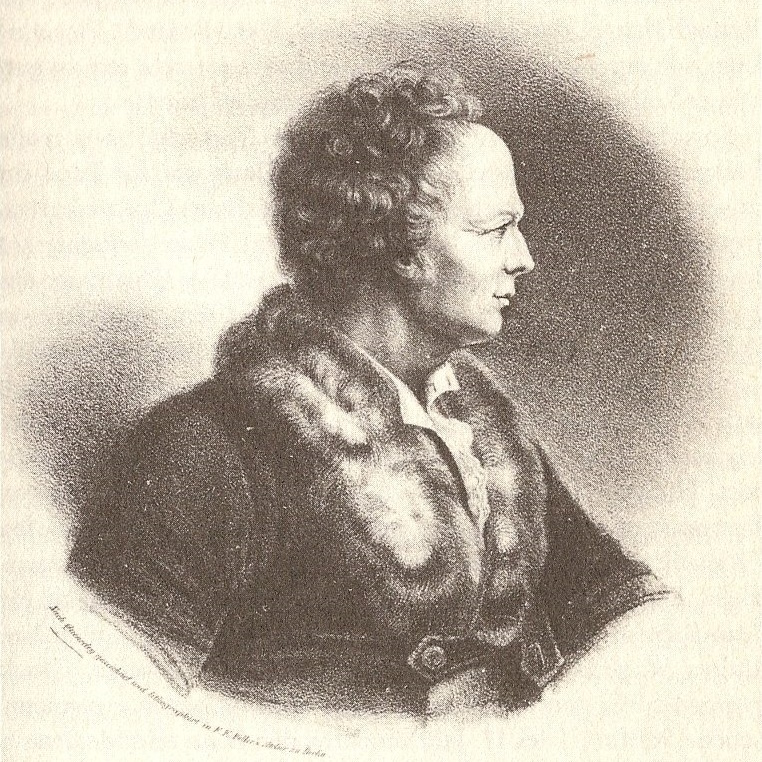
Portrait of Christoph Willibald Gluck, ca. 1750

Il trionfo di Clelia (The Triumph of Cloelia), Wq. 31, is an opera composed by Christoph Willibald Gluck. It takes the form of a dramma per musica in three acts. The Italian-language libretto by Pietro Metastasio is based on several semi-legendary narratives concerning the founding of the Roman Republic. The opera premiered on 14 May 1763 at the Teatro Comunale di Bologna. Although rarely performed since then, it was revived in London in 2012 at the Royal Opera House's Linbury Studio.

Gluck's opera was the second setting of Metastasio's libretto. The first was composed by Johann Adolph Hasse and premiered in Vienna in 1762. Among the many subsequent settings is Josef Mysliveček's Il trionfo di Clelia which premiered in Turin in 1767.

The opera's story revolves around four main characters: Porsenna, an Etruscan king who laid siege to Rome in 509 BC to restore the monarchy; Tarquinio, a deposed King of Rome; Clelia, a woman of the Roman Republic held hostage by Porsenna; and Orazio, ambassador of the Roman Republic and Clelia's intended husband.
