= Hero of Rome =

- Directed by: Giorgio Ferroni
- Screenplay by: Remigio Del Grosso; Antonio Visone
- Story by: Alberta Montanti
- Starring: Gordon Scott; Gabriella Pallotta; Massimo Serato; Gabriele Antonini
- Cinematography: Augusto Tiezzi
- Edited by: Antonietta Zita
- Music by: Angelo Francesco Lavagnino
- Production companies: Dorica Film; Produzi Associati; Unicite; Les Films Jacques Lettienne
- Release date: 25 June 1964
- Running time: 90 minutes
- Countries: Italy; France
- Language: Italian

Hero of Rome (Italian: Il Colosso di Roma) is a 1964 sword and sandal film set in Rome in 508 BC, and depicts the expulsion of the last kings of Rome and the legend of Gaius Mucius Scaevola.

== Plot ==
The city-state of Rome has just expelled its Etruscan overlords and become a republic. The Etruscans declare war in an attempt to regain their territory. The warrior Scaevola is captured trying to assassinate king Porsenna, and threatened with torture unless he gives them strategic information. Scaevola instead thrusts his right hand into a brazier and lets it burn, demonstrating that he loves Rome too much to care about physical pain, and warns the king that many other Romans would do the same.

The awed Porsenna releases him and sues for peace after learning the truth about how the Romans banished their last king, Lucius Tarquinius Superbus. However, Tarquin still wants to continue the war to regain his throne, and orders his men to kill Mucius later. Surviving the ambush, Mucius returns to Rome to lead his countrymen, but the damage to his hand prevents him from wielding a sword in his right hand again.

The Roman Senate manages the war badly, and it becomes clear that only Scaevola can lead his countrymen to victory. He trains himself to fight with his left hand, and is soon able to return to battle and defeat the Etruscan kings.

== Cast ==
- Gordon Scott as Gaius Mucius Scaevola
- Gabriella Pallotta as Cloelia
- Massimo Serato as Lucius Tarquinius Superbus
- Roldano Lupi as Porsenna
- Gabriele Antonini as Arunte
- Maria Pia Conte as Valeria
- Franco Fantasia as Claudio

== Release ==
Hero of Rome was released in Italy with a 90-minute running time on June 25, 1964. Some of the early video prints confused the correct order of the reels.

== Reception ==
A anonymous reviewer in the Monthly Film Bulletin reviewed a dubbed version titled Arm of Fire. The review declared that the films narrative was "unconvincing and improbable" and that the dialogue was hampered by English dialogue that was "on the level of the cartoon strip" while the "climactic spectacle is competently handled, but other ocular highlights are few."

== Bibliography ==
- Hughes, Howard (2011). Cinema Italiano - The Complete Guide From Classics To Cult. London - New York: I.B.Tauris. ISBN 978-1-84885-608-0.
- Kinnard, Roy; Crnkovich, Tony (2017). Italian Sword and Sandal Films, 1908-1990. McFarland. ISBN 978-1476662916.
