= Et facere et pati fortia Romanum est =

Et facere et pati fortia Romanum est is a Latin phrase meaning "It is the attribute of a Roman to perform as well as to suffer mighty things." It comes from Livy's Ab urbe condita 2, 12, 9.

== Origin ==
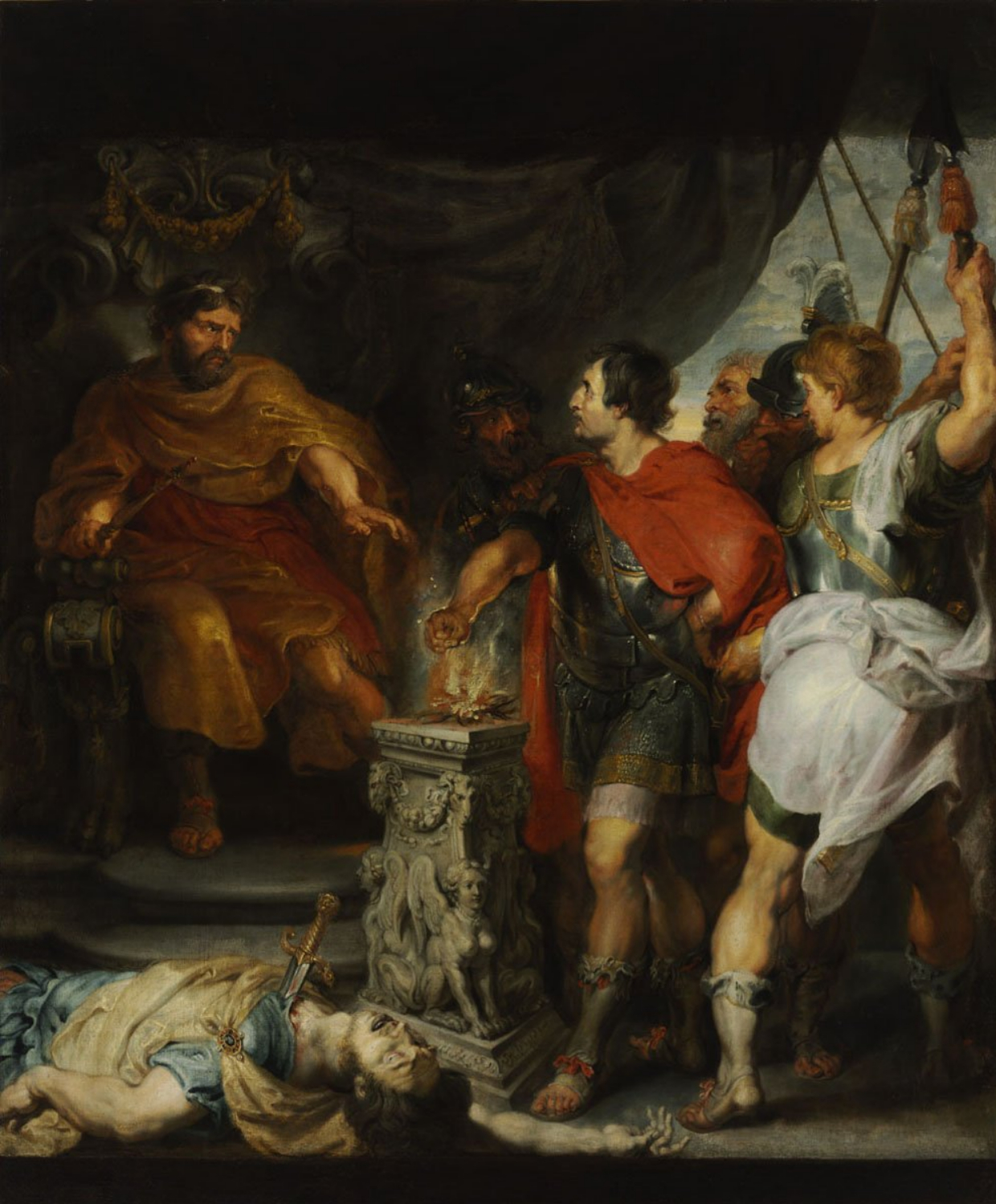
Mucius Scaevola before Lars Porsenna, by Rubens and van Dyck (c.1618–1620 )

According to legend, a certain Mucius Cordus attempted to kill the Etruscan king Lars Porsena, who was besieging Rome. When the Etruscans caught him, he said “Romanus sum civis” (I am a Roman citizen) and continued with "et facere et pati fortia Romanum est". To prove his point, he held his right hand without flinching in a fire that the king had ordered to torture him. Porsena was so impressed by this, that he gave up the besiegement of Rome.

In this way Mucius Cordus became an example for a brave and audacious Roman burgess. He is assumed to have got his byname “Scaevola” ("The “left-hand”) because of his act.

Cicero was later famously to use the phrase civis romanus sum in a different context.
