= George Gregoriou =

George Gregoriou was an American political writer and professor of Greek Cypriot origins. Born in Cyprus in 1936 into a nationalistic family; his father was interned by the colonial authorities during the insurrection in 1931. The family emigrated to the United States in 1950 but continued to support Cyprus' struggle for freedom, a link that led Gregoriou to the writing of the books Cyprus: A View from the Diaspora.

He worked as a political science professor at the William Paterson University of New Jersey, has written numerous books on the Western geopolitical strategies in the Eastern Mediterranean, particularly the political forces of British colonialism, the Greek and Cyprus events responsible for the events leading to the de facto partition in 1974 and the Anglo-American policies outside and inside the United Nations to legitimize the facts on the ground created by the Turkish occupation of northern Cyprus.

Georgiou was highly critical of American foreign policies and ascribes the partitioning of Cyprus to an American plot as much as Turkish invasion. He has also criticised the war on Iraq and remarked that the Pentagon "needs to soil the Iraqi landscape with young blood", "a small price for oil, profits, and power for the political-military-industrial complex".. In a recent editorial, Georgiou disputed whether "the Pentagon, the CIA, the White House ever tell the truth".

He has been criticized from within the Greek-American community for anti-Americanism, to which he has responded that "if being "pro-American" requires lying, you should count me out, as it comes too close to militarism and fascism" . Georgiou staunchly opposes capitalism in his editorials, and he has supported that "the capitalist state does not respond to peoples’ needs, unless they take to the streets". He has also ascribed the problems to modern America, not to specific party politics, but "the very nature of capitalism". Finally, Georgiou has decried Deng Xiaoping for "unleashing predator capitalism" on China after the death of Mao Zedong , and castigated "politicians who have the illusion of improving the lives of the masses within existing structures" as "political criminals".

Gregoriou retired from teaching at William Paterson University in 2006 and died on February 20, 2020
