= Gabriele Antonini =

Italian actor (1938–2018)

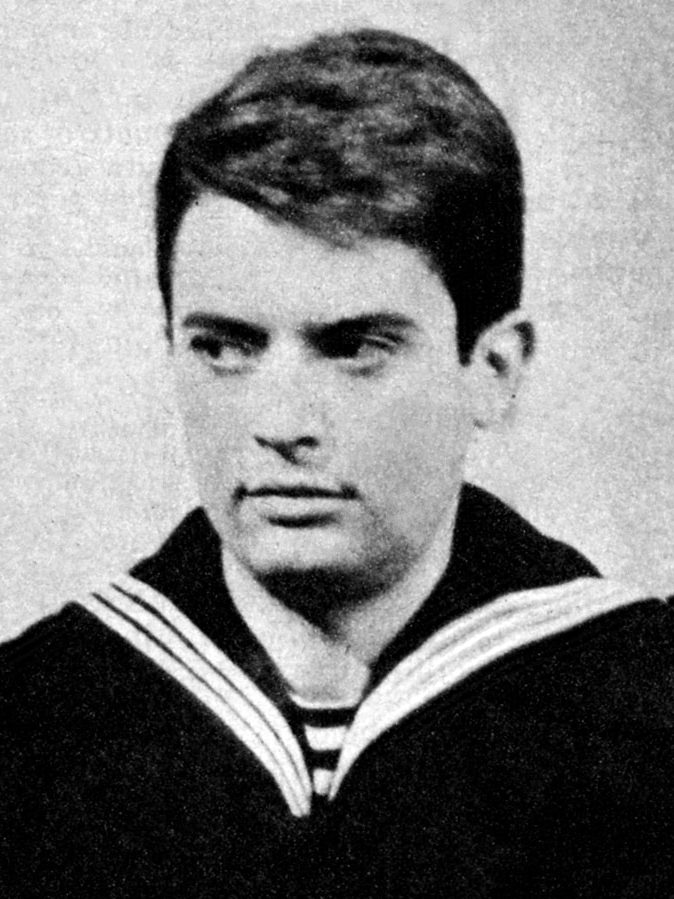
- Born: 16 April 1938; Rome, Italy
- Died: October 2018 (aged 80); Rome, Italy
- Occupation: Actor

Gabriele Antonini (16 April 1938 – October 2018) was an Italian film, stage and television actor.

== Life and career ==
Born in Rome, the son of an army general, Antonini was chosen by Mario Monicelli for the role of Sandro in Fathers and Sons when he was still attended high school. Following the success of the film Antonini interrupted his studies and started appearing in a significant number of films, being mainly active in teen comedies and peplum films. He was also active on stage, in which he worked with Luchino Visconti, Giorgio Albertazzi and Diego Fabbri, among others. He was also active as a voice actor and a dubber.

== Filmography ==
Year	Title	Role	Notes
1957	Fathers and Sons	Sandro Bacci	
1957	Ragazzi della marina		
1958	Hercules	Ulysses	
1958	Domenica è sempre domenica	Giancarlo	
1959	Hercules Unchained	Ulysses - Son of Laertes	
1959	Head of a Tyrant	Brother	
1960	Austerlitz	Josephine's Lover	Uncredited
1961	The Seven Revenges	Kir - Fratello di Ivan	
1961	The Mongols	Temugin	
1961	Samson and the Seven Miracles of the World	Prince Cho	
1962	Il segno del vendicatore	Zorro / Antonio	
1962	Colpo gobbo all'italiana	Ennio	
1962	Eighteen in the Sun	Louie	
1962	The Seventh Sword	Phillip II	
1962	Gli eroi del doppio gioco	Benito Rossi	
1963	Goliath and the Rebel Slave	Alexander the Great	
1964	Revenge of the Musketeers	King Charles II	
1964	Hero of Rome	Arunte	
1964	Revolt of the Barbarians		
1965	Soldati e caporali	Federico Giustini	
1966	Perdono	Gabriele	
1968	Franco, Ciccio e le vedove allegre	Maurizio	
1975	Il fidanzamento	Lucio Davossa	
