= Mucius Scaevola before Lars Porsenna =

Painting by workshop of Rubens after design by Rubens

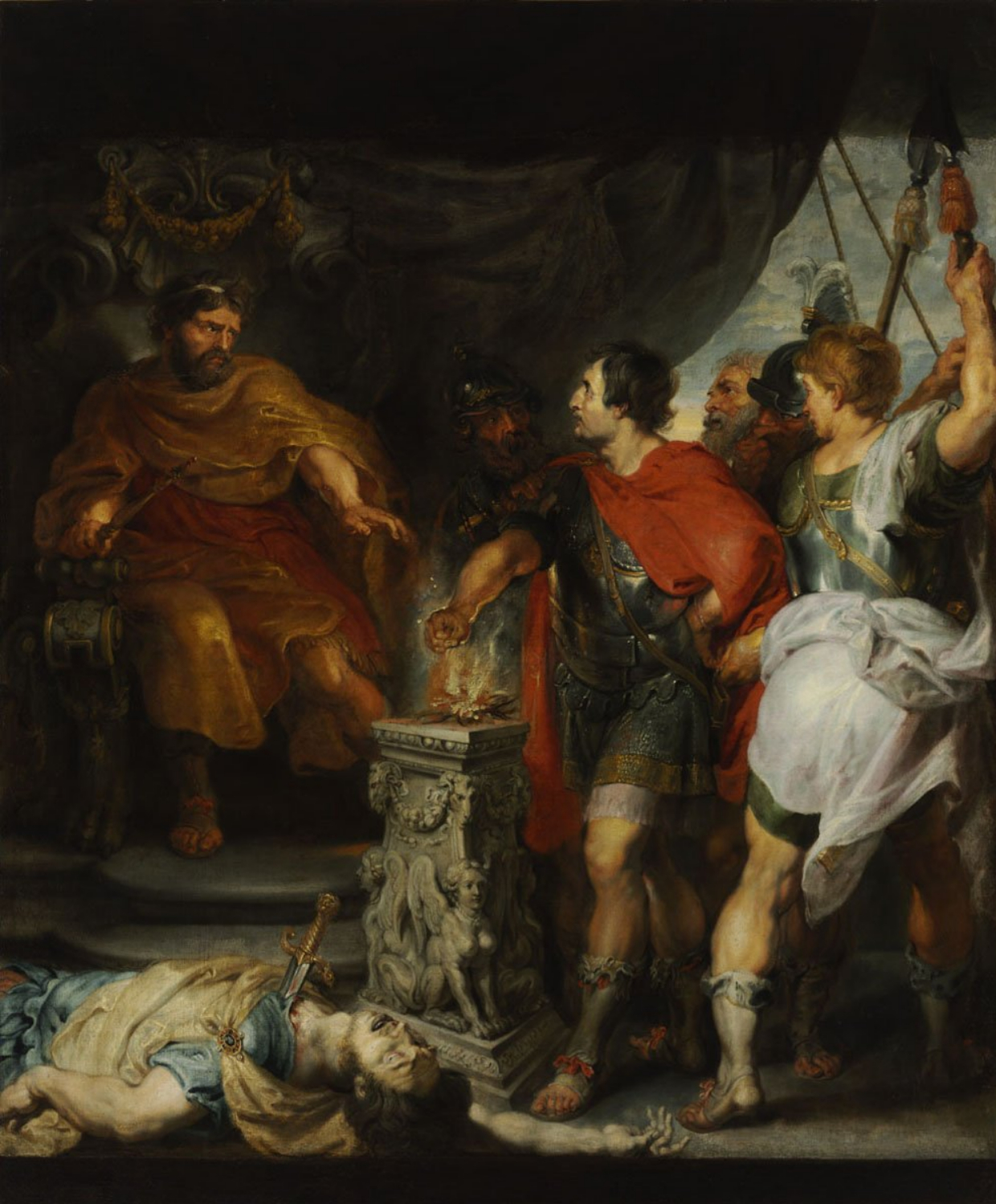
Mucius Scaevola before Lars Porsenna (c. 1626-1628) by workshop of Rubens

Mucius Scaevola before Lars Porsenna or The Fortitude of Scaevola is an oil on canvas painting which was executed after a design by Rubens by artists in Rubens' workshop who may have included Anthony van Dyck. The work is in the collection of the Museum of Fine Arts in Budapest, Hungary. It was formerly thought to be the work of the same subject painted by Rubens for the Spanish royal court and brought with him on his visit to Madrid in 1628. It is now assumed that the original picture was destroyed by a fire in the Royal Alcázar of Madrid in 1735 and this painting is a studio copy dating to 1626-1628.

== Subject ==
The subject matter of the painting is drawn from Livy 2:12 and Plutarch (Publicola, 17, 1) and in particular their account of Mucius Scaevola's bravery before Lars Porsenna after the former's failed attempt to assassinate the latter. According to the story, Mucius secretly entered Porsenna's camp with the aim of assassinating him. Failing to recognize the king, he mistakenly killed his secretary who was sitting beside the king. After his arrest, he showed his fortitude in the prospect of torture by thrusting his right hand into a fire of an altar prepared for sacrifice. This explains his surname Scaevola (‘left-handed').

== Rubens' treatment ==
Rubens' representation of the story stays close to his Latin sources. It shows Scaevola facing King Porsenna on his throne putting his clenched fist in the fire. His sword is visible sticking in the corpse of the murdered secretary. Rubens seems to have followed Plutarc's treatment of the story h in particular, because it is this author who implies that Scaevola left his sword in the body of his victim.

== Initial oil sketches ==
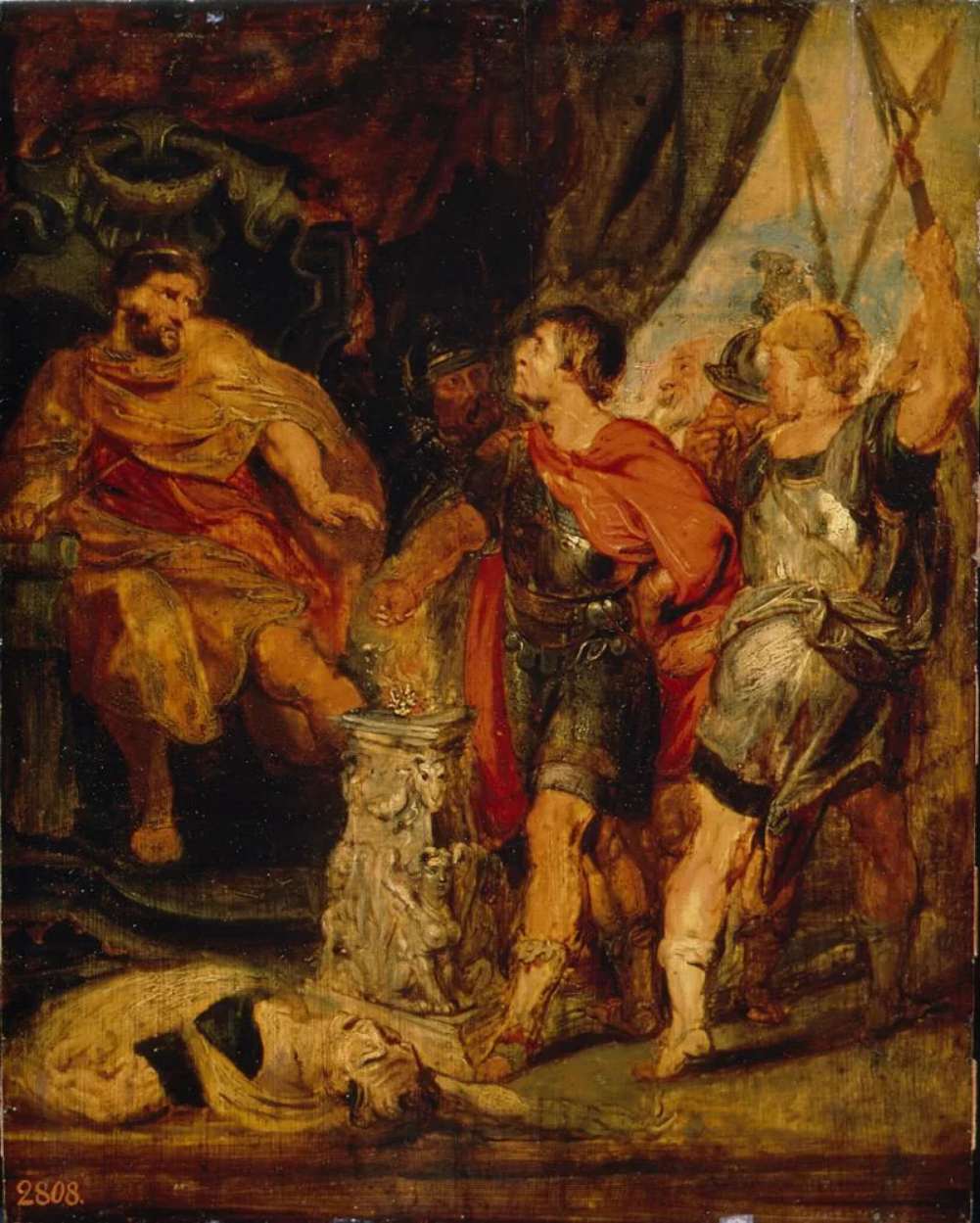
Presumed oil sketch for the work by Rubens, Pushkin Museum

Initial oil sketches and drawings for the work date to before 1620 and are now in the Pushkin Museum and British Museum. These show that Rubens produced the overall composition, with van Dyck adding details and other elements and finishing the painting.

The drawings now in the British Museum shows two men holding their nose at the smell of burning flesh, whereas van Dyck only included one, immediately behind Scaevola himself.

== Provenance ==
The work is first recorded in 1776 in Vienna in the collection of prince Wenzel Anton, Prince of Kaunitz-Rietberg from whom it passed to prince Aloys von Kaunitz-Rietberg. It was later in the collection of Count Lambert in Vienna (as 'Rubens') and then in the Pál Antal Esterházy collection which was moved in 1860 from Vienna to Pest where it was exhibited in the Hungarian Academy for Sciences. The painting was acquired by the Hungarian state in 1871 and exhibited in the Museum of Fine Arts in Budapest under inv./cat.nr. 749 from that year.
