= The Seventh Sword =

- Italian film poster
- Directed by: Riccardo Freda
- Screenplay by: Riccardo Freda; Filippo Sanjust
- Story by: Riccardo Freda; Filippo Sanjust
- Produced by: Cino Del Duca; Robert De Nesle
- Starring: Brett Halsey; Béatrice Altariba; Giulio Bosetti; Gabriele Antonini
- Cinematography: Raffaele Masciocchi
- Edited by: Franco Fraticelli
- Music by: Franco Mannino
- Production companies: Adelphia; Francisco Films
- Distributed by: Cino Del Duca
- Release date: 30 October 1962 (Italy)
- Running time: 94 minutes
- Countries: Italy; France
- Box office: ₤140 million

The Seventh Sword (Italian: Le sette spade del vendicatore, French: Sept épées pour le roi, also known as Seven Swords for the King) is a 1962 Italian-French adventure film directed by Riccardo Freda. It is a remake of Freda's debut film Don Cesare di Bazan.

== Cast ==
- Brett Halsey as Don Carlos di Bazan
- Béatrice Altariba as Isabella
- Giulio Bosetti as Duke of Saavedra
- Gabriele Antonini as Filippo III
- Mario Scaccia as Cardinal Inquisitor
- Gabriele Tinti as Corvo
- Alberto Sorrentino as Sancho
- Jacques Stany as The seargeant

== Release ==
The Seventh Swords was released in Italy on 30 October 1962, where it was distributed by Cino Del Duca. The film had a domestic gross of 140 million Italian lira in Italy.

== Reception ==
In a contemporary review, the Monthly Film Bulletin stated that the Director "is here at his best" and that The Seventh Sword is "a film which is in its way delightful, with much to charm the eye and tickle the senses" The review noted specific scenes a tongue-in-cheek fight scene that plays in and out of a bedroom and "the final duel staged in a torture chamber of almost surrealist design and lurid colours"
