= Giulio Bosetti =

Italian actor and director (1930–2009)

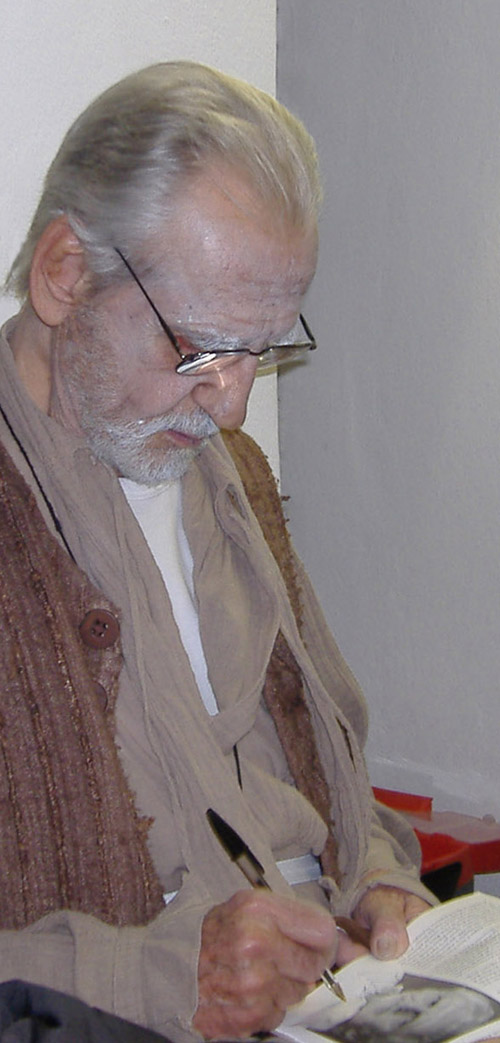
- Giulio Bosetti in 2008
- Born: 26 December 1930; Bergamo, Italy
- Died: 24 December 2009 (aged 78); Milan, Italy
- Occupation: Actor
- Years active: 1960–2008

Giulio Bosetti (26 December 1930 – 24 December 2009) was an Italian actor and director.

== Career ==
Giulio Bosetti appeared in film, on television and on stage over 30 times. In 1972, he narrated the television special La vita di Leonardo da Vinci. The biography succeeded in winning a Golden Globe for Best TV Special, and Bosetti was nominated for an Emmy for Outstanding Continued performance by an Actor in a Leading Role.

One of his last works was Il Divo, in which he portrayed the journalist Eugenio Scalfari. The film deals with the life of Italy's Giulio Andreotti, a man elected Prime Minister by Parliament seven times since it was established in 1946.

== Death ==
Giulio Bosetti died two days short of his 79th birthday in Milan from cancer.

== Filmography ==
Year	Title	Role	Notes
1960	Morgan, the Pirate	Sir Thomas Modyford	
1962	The Seventh Sword	Duke of Saavedra	
1962	The Reluctant Saint	Brother Orlando	
1962	The Captive City	Narriman	
1962	Imperial Venus	Camillo Borghese	
1963	Gold for the Caesars	Scipio	
1963	Duel at the Rio Grande	Capitan Gomez	
1963	A Sentimental Attempt	Alberto, Dino's Friend	
1963	The Terrorist	Ugo Ongaro	
1963	The Organizer		Uncredited
1965	Made in Italy	Renato	(segment "3 'La Donna', episode 1")
1966	Requiem for a Secret Agent	Erik	
1967	Un amico		
1968	Red Roses for Angelica	Il Marsigliese	
1980	Il ritorno di Casanova		
1988	Il segreto dell'uomo solitario	Cristiano	
1999	Nag la bombe	Abramo	
2003	Incantato	Dott. Gardini	
2003	Good Morning, Night	Paolo VI	
2008	Il Divo	Eugenio Scalfari	(final film role)
