= Ex injuria jus non oritur =

Principle of international law which states that unjust acts cannot be used to create law

Ex injuria jus non oritur (Latin for "law (or right) does not arise from injustice") is a principle of international law. The phrase implies that "illegal acts do not create law". This principle was used to create the Stimson Doctrine. The rival principle is ex factis jus oritur, in which the existence of facts creates law. Both principles are utilized concomitantly in historical and contemporary international law, and applied situationally, depending on the informing circumstance.

== See also ==
- Ex factis jus oritur
- Facts on the ground
- Fait accompli
- Status quo ante bellum
- Odious debt
- Uti possidetis
