= Horatius Cocles =

Roman soldier who prevented an Etruscan army from crossing the bridge over the Tiber

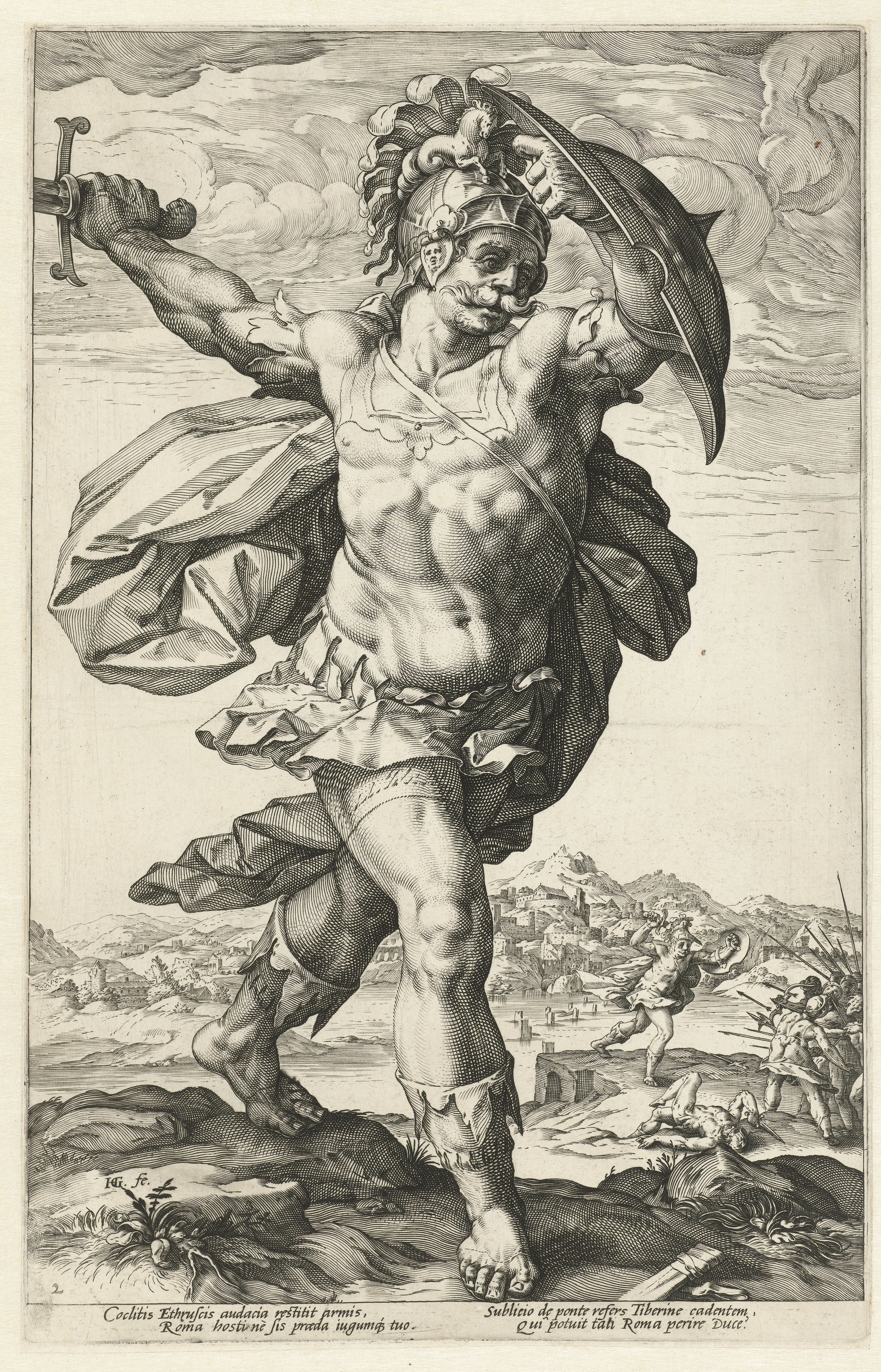
Horatius Cocles, a fanciful 1586 engraving by Hendrick Goltzius.

Publius Horatius Cocles (/hɒˈreɪʃɪəs ˈkəʊkliːz/) was an officer in the army of the early Roman Republic who defended the Pons Sublicius from the invading army of the Etruscan king Lars Porsena of Clusium in the late sixth century BC, during the war between Rome and Clusium. By defending the narrow bridge, he and his companions were able to hold off the attacking army long enough to allow other Romans to destroy the bridge behind him, blocking the Etruscans' advance and saving the city.

== Background ==
Siege of Rome by the Etruscans under Lars Porsena. This animated depiction shows the phases of the battle, including the defense of the bridge by Horatius.

Horatius was a member of the ancient patrician house of the Horatii, celebrated in legend since the combat between the Horatii and the Curiatii in the time of Tullus Hostilius, the third Roman king. He was a nephew of the consul, Marcus Horatius Pulvillus, and is said to have obtained his agnomen, Cocles, meaning "one-eyed", (Note: Varro suggested that "Cocles" was derived from the Latin "oculus"; others have suggested a Greek loan-word, from the same root as "cyclops".) because he lost an eye in the Battle of the Sublician Bridge. However, this may be a later elaboration, as the famous statue of Horatius, lame and one-eyed, which was still visible, though heavily weathered, in the time of Pliny the Elder, was probably intended as a depiction of the god Vulcan, and only became identified with Horatius when its original subject was no longer recognizable.

In 508 BC, Lars Porsena was at the head of an army that marched on Rome. Concentrating his forces on the west bank of the Tiber, Porsena assaulted the Janiculum and seized it and all its materiel from the terrified Roman guard. Porsena left an Etruscan garrison to hold it, then proceeded towards the Pons Sublicius, the only bridge across the Tiber. The Romans awaited in the Naevian Meadow between Porsena and the bridge. The Tarquins commanded the Etruscan left wing facing the Roman troops of Spurius Larcius and Titus Herminius. Octavius Mamilius commanded the Etruscan right wing, consisting of Latins; they faced Romans under Marcus Valerius Volusus and Titus Lucretius Tricipitinus. Porsena commanded the center, facing the two Roman consuls. Porsena had the Romans outnumbered, and intended to intimidate them into retreat.

In the ensuing battle, the Etruscan right wing was successful, Valerius and Lucretius sustaining wounds and being carried off the field. The Romans began to panic and ran for the bridge, pursued by the enemy.

== Horatius at the bridge ==
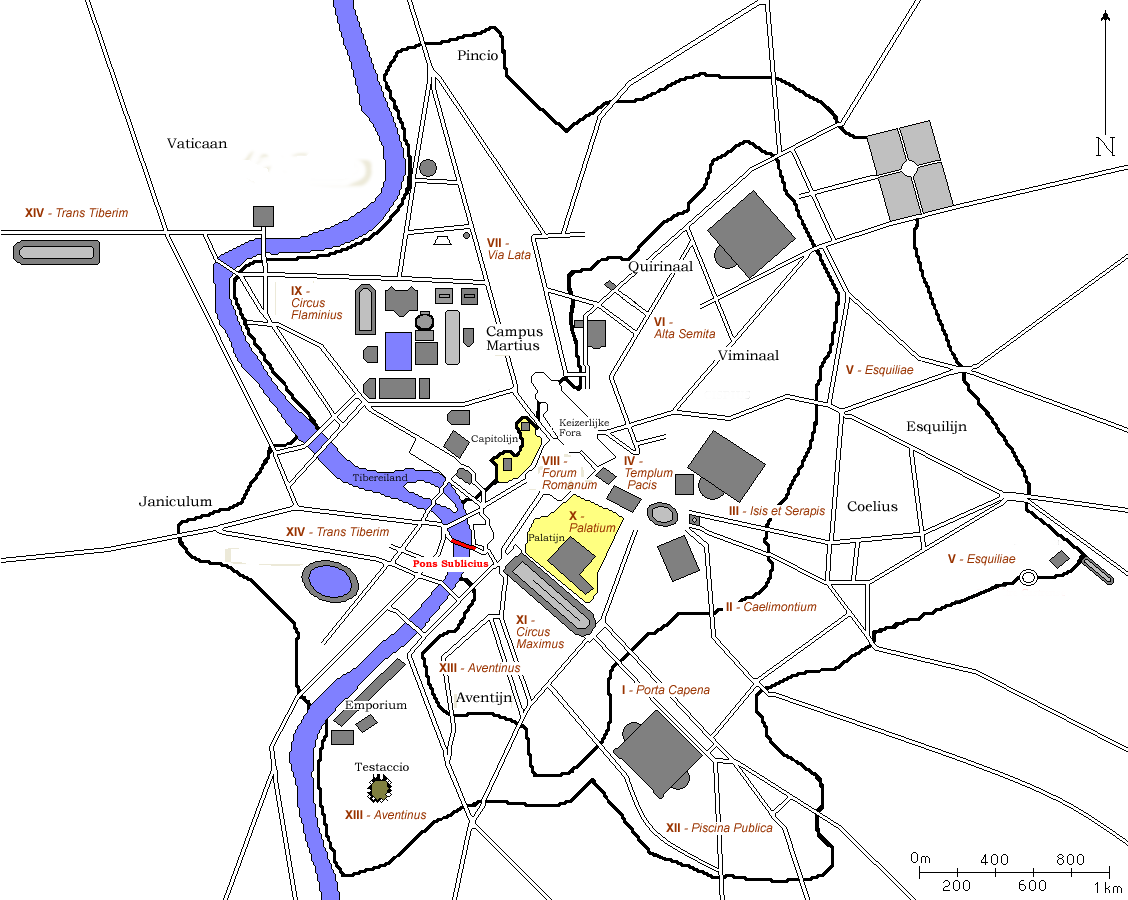
Map of Rome, with dark lines marking the city walls: the innermost wall is the Servian Wall; the outer wall did not exist at the time of the battle. The Naevian Gate (indicated) in the Servian Wall leads to the Pons Sublicius, the bridge across the Tiber. The Janiculum is to the west, just beyond the edge of the map; between the hill and the bridge is the Naevian Meadow.

Three Romans now defended the Pons Sublicius: the right wing's commanders, Spurius Larcius and Titus Herminius Aquilinus, along with Publius Horatius Cocles, a junior officer "on guard at the bridge when he saw the Janiculum taken by a sudden assault and the enemy rushing down from it to the river...." The three defenders withstood sword and missile attacks until the Roman troops had all crossed.

Livy's briefer and more skeptical account tells of no battle, only that Horatius' "own men, a panic-struck mob, were deserting their posts and throwing away their arms"; however, Horatius' courage managed to shame the two commanders, Herminius and Lartius, to assist him in his defense of the bridge.

Dionysius' account explains, "Herminius and Lartius, their defensive arms being now rendered useless by the continual blows they received, began to retreat gradually." They ordered Horatius to retreat with them, but he stood his ground. Understanding the threat to Rome if the enemy were to cross the river, he ordered his men to destroy the bridge. The enemy was shocked not only by Horatius' suicidal last stand, but also by his decision to use a pile of bodies as a shield wall. Horatius was struck by enemy missiles many times including a spear in the buttocks. As the bridge collapsed, he "leaped fully armed into the river and swimming across... he emerged upon the shore without having lost any of his weapons."

Livy's version has him uttering this prayer to Father Tiber: "Tiberinus, holy father, I pray thee to receive into thy propitious stream these arms and this thy warrior."

Horatius was awarded a crown for his valor, and conducted into the city by a singing crowd joined by a grateful city. Horatius was now disabled, and so could no longer serve in the army or hold public office, but he was provided "as much of the public land as he himself could plow around in one day with a yoke of oxen," and each citizen of Rome was obligated to give him one day's ration of food. He was also honoured with a bronze statue in the comitium. (Note: Pliny, xxxiv. 11: "It was for a very different, and more important reason, that the statue of Horatius Cocles was erected, he having singly prevented the enemy from passing the important Sublician bridge.")

In the account related by Polybius, Horatius did not survive his leap into the Tiber. He describes Horatius as an example of the men who have "devoted themselves to inevitable death... to save the lives of other citizens.... [H]e threw himself into the river with his armor, and there lost his life as he had designed."

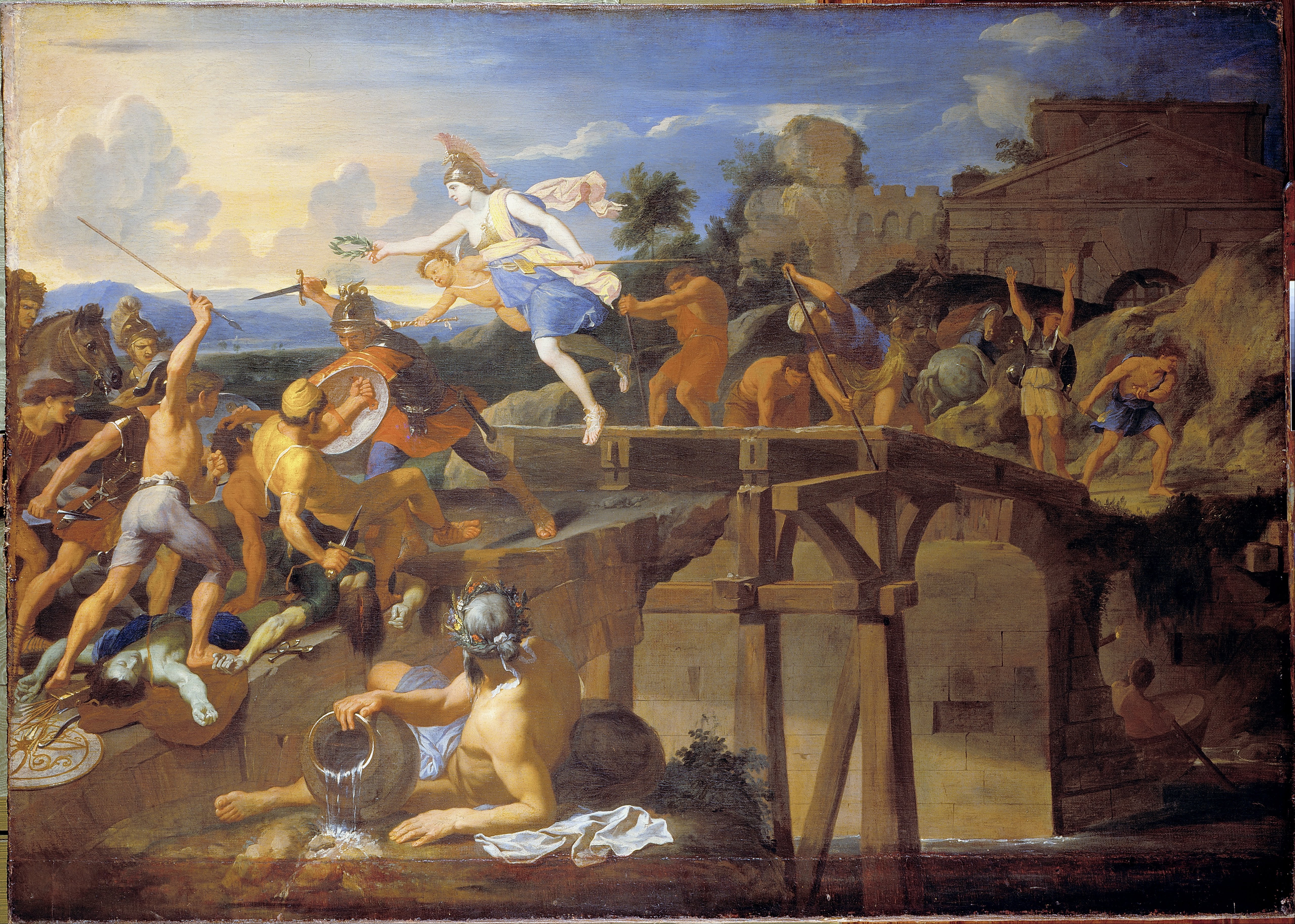
Horatius at the Bridge, Charles Le Brun, 1642–1643

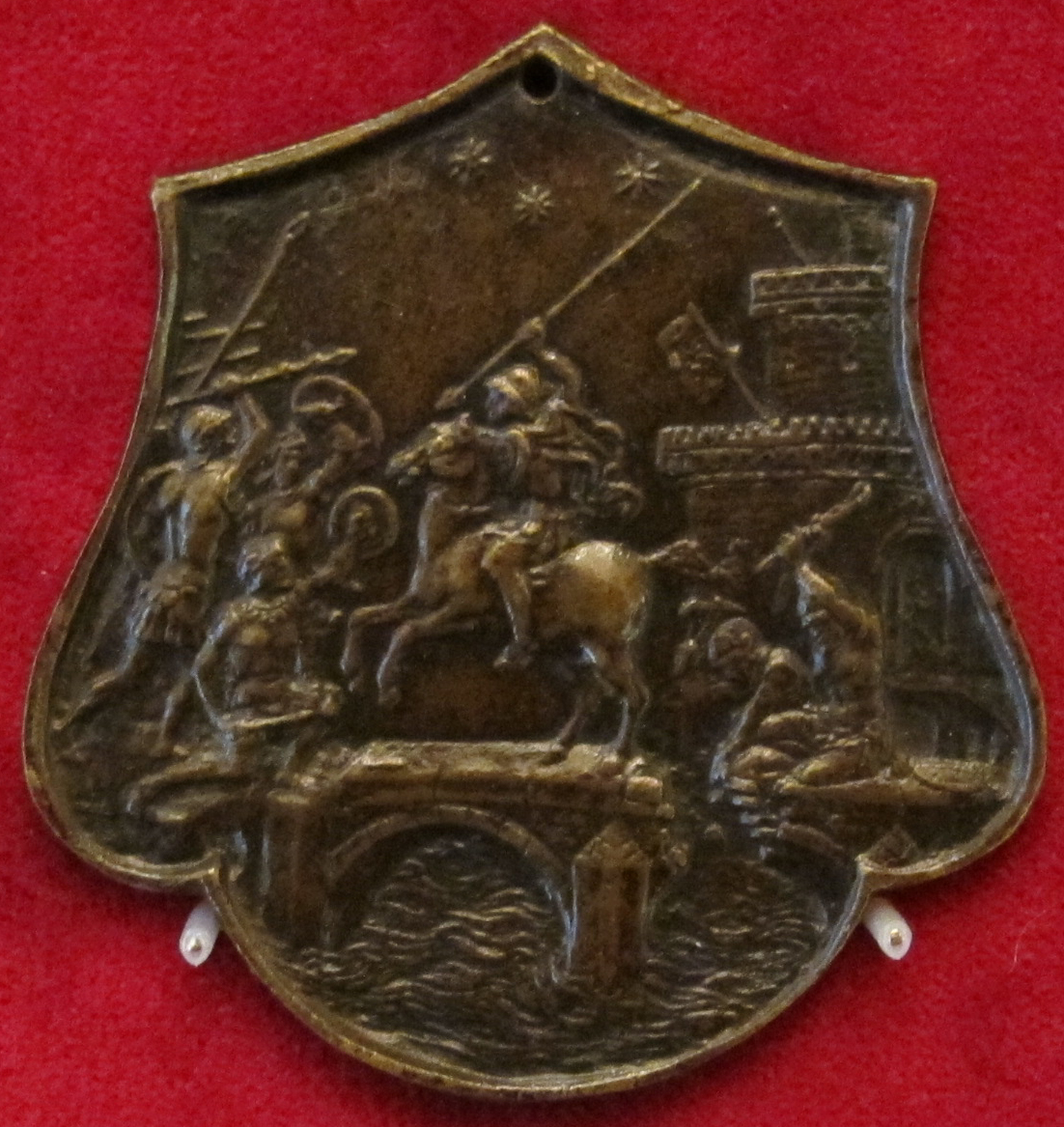
Horatius at the bridge, Renaissance plaquette, Wallace Collection

== Aftermath ==
Horatius' defense stymied Lars Porsena's direct assault on the city walls, forcing him into a siege. In some accounts, the siege would conclude with a peace treaty, leaving Rome unconquered, although in other accounts Porsena eventually took the city and held it briefly, before withdrawing.

== Skeptical points of view ==
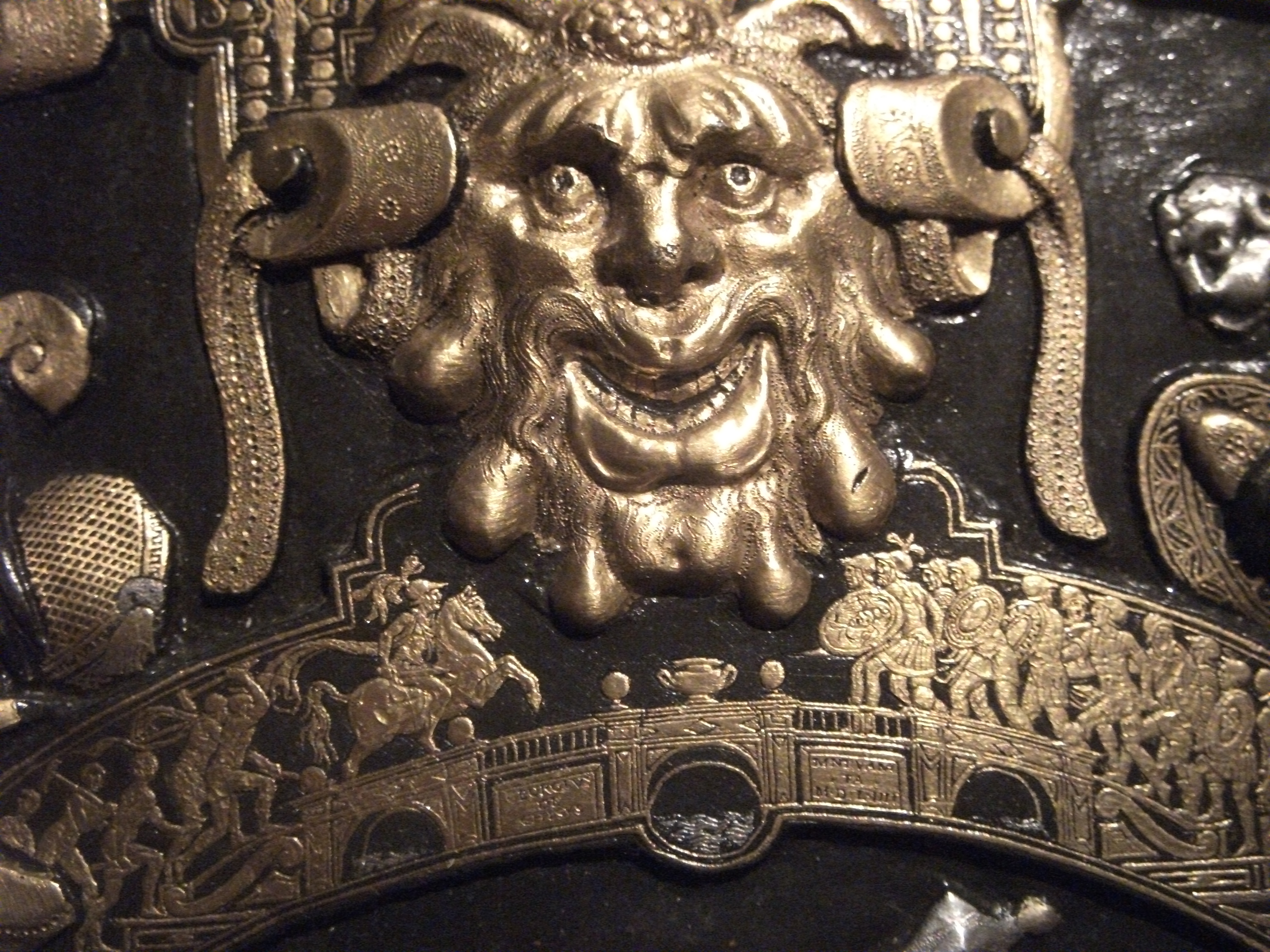
Detail from the Ghisi Shield in the Waddesdon Bequest; a grotesque head in the larger scale above Horatius at the bridge in the smaller

The story of Horatius at the Bridge appears in many ancient sources, including Plutarch, Dionysius of Halicarnassus, and Livy. Florus tacitly acknowledges the extraordinary nature of the story: "It was on this occasion that those three prodigies and marvels of Rome made their appearance, Horatius, Mucius and Cloelia, who, were they not recorded in our annals, would seem fabulous characters at the present day." Tacitus notes in passing that "when [Rome] was surrendered, [Lars Porsena] did not violate the seat of Jupiter" (Rome's most important temple). This could be understood to mean that Rome surrendered during or after this battle.

Livy viewed the story as legendary, dubious of Horatius' fully armed swim, noting "though many missiles fell over him he swam across in safety to his friends, an act of daring more famous than credible with posterity."

T.J. Cornell deems these various accounts invented by "unscrupulous annalists" as "face-saving victories in the immediate aftermath of these defeats", insisting "The annalists of the first century BC are thus seen principally as entertainers...."

== Later uses of the theme ==
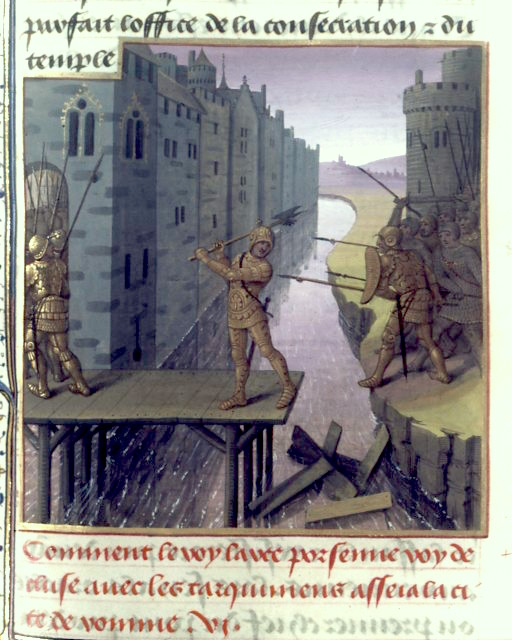
15th-century miniature

The story of the redoubtable Horatius at the Bridge began to be depicted in art during the Renaissance, but was never an especially popular theme. It tended to be shown by artists who favored recondite classical stories, and appear in the minor arts, such as plaquettes and maiolica.

Horatius and his exploits at the Bridge are depicted in the libretto Il trionfo di Clelia by Metastasio, written for a production in Vienna in 1762 with music by Johann Adolph Hasse. He is portrayed as a Roman envoy to the invading forces of Lars Porsena, king of the Etruscans, in an attempt to sue for peace, and lover of the Roman noblewoman Cloelia.

Napoleon, after the battle of Klausen, nicknamed General Thomas-Alexandre Dumas "The Horatius Cocles of Tyrol" for his solo defense of a bridge over the River Eisack.

The story of "Horatius at the Bridge" is retold in verse in the poem "Horatius" in Lays of Ancient Rome by Thomas Babington Macaulay, which enjoyed great popularity in the late nineteenth and early twentieth century. The details of the poem often vary from the traditional tale by poetic license. Winston Churchill wrote that while he "stagnated in the lowest form" at Harrow, he gained a prize open to the whole school by reciting the whole "twelve hundred lines" of "Horatius". (Note: "Horatius" is not quite 600 lines; perhaps Churchill was referring to another of the Lays as well; if so probably "The Armada".) A biographical film about Churchill, Into the Storm (2009), begins with the much older Churchill reciting from "Horatius": "And how can man die better, than facing fearful odds, for the ashes of his fathers, and the temples of his gods." Later in the film, the same verses feature prominently in a nostalgic and morose address Churchill delivers to his war cabinet. Churchill also recites from "Horatius" in a scene from the biographical film Darkest Hour, and these lines occur in numerous works of fiction.

== See also ==
- Horatia gens
- Vulcanal, a statue in honour of Horatius Cocles was said to have been set up here.

== Bibliography ==
- Polybius, Historiae (The Histories).
- Dionysius of Halicarnassus, Romaike Archaiologia (Roman Antiquities).
- Titus Livius (Livy), History of Rome.
- Gaius Plinius Secundus (Pliny the Elder), Historia Naturalis (Natural History).
- Publius Cornelius Tacitus, Historiae.
- Lucius Annaeus Florus, Epitome de T. Livio Bellorum Omnium Annorum DCC (Epitome of Livy: All the Wars of Seven Hundred Years).
- Michael Grant, Roman Myths, Dorset Press (1971).
- T. J. Cornell, "The Formation of the Historical Tradition of Early Rome", in Past Perspectives: Studies in Greek and Roman Historical Writing, T. J. Cornell, I. S. Moxon, John Woodman, eds., Cambridge University Press (1986).
