= Ex factis jus oritur =

Principle of international law which states that law must arise from the facts

Ex factis jus oritur (Latin: the law arises from the facts) is a principle of international law. The phrase is based on the simple notion that certain legal consequences attach to particular facts. Its rival principle is ex injuria jus non oritur in which unjust acts cannot create law. Both principles are utilized concomitantly in historical and contemporary international law, and applied situationally, depending on the informing circumstance.

== See also ==
- Facts on the ground
- Fait accompli
- De facto
- Status quo ante bellum
- Revanchism
- Uti possidetis
