= Cloelia =

Semi-legendary woman from the early history of ancient Rome

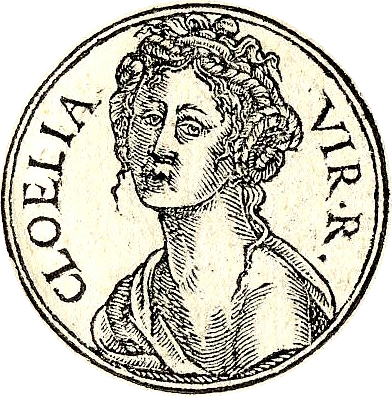
Cloelia in the 16th-century Promptuarii Iconum Insigniorum

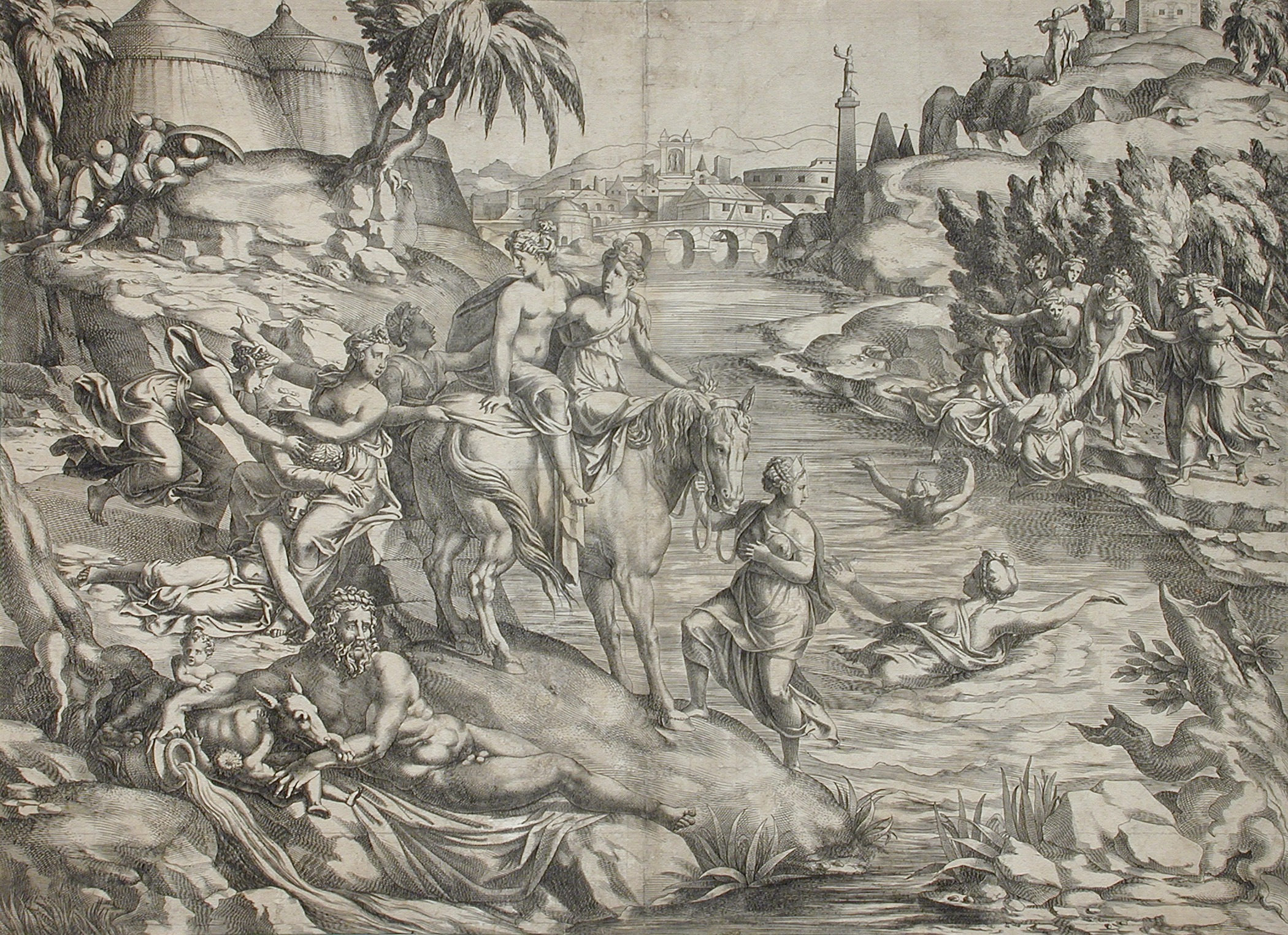
16th century piece by Pierre Milan and René Boyvin depicting one account of Cloelia's escape

Cloelia (Ancient Greek: Κλοιλία) was a legendary woman from the early history of ancient Rome.

== Biography ==
She was one of the women taken hostage by Lars Porsena as a part of the peace treaty which ended the war between Rome and Clusium in 508 BC. Ancient historians present two different stories explaining her escape. The first version of Cloelia's escape tells that the female hostages went to the river to bathe. Having persuaded their guards to leave them alone at the river, in order to remain modest, they swam across the river into Roman territory. The second version claims that Cloelia escaped from the Etruscan camp, leading away a group of Roman virgins. According to Valerius Maximus, she fled upon a horse, and swam across the river Tiber through a barrage of hostile darts, thus bringing her band of girls to safety.

When Porsena learnt of their escape, he quickly sent emissaries to Rome demanding her return. However, Porsena soon reconsidered, deciding that her deeds were worthy of admiration equal to that of Horatius Cocles and Gaius Mucius Scaevola. He declared to the Romans that if she were restored to him he would send her back to Rome safe and inviolate, but if his demands were not met he should regard the treaty as broken.

The Romans agreed to the conditions and returned the pledge of peace, as the treaty required. Porsena praised Cloelia on her arrival and, as a reward for her heroism, promised to release half the share of his hostages of her choice. It is said that she selected the young boys, as was unanimously decided by the hostages, since they were particularly at risk of abuse.

Once peace had been established, the Romans celebrated her valour by building a statue of a maiden seated on a horse, set up on the summit of the Via Sacra.

== Cultural depictions ==
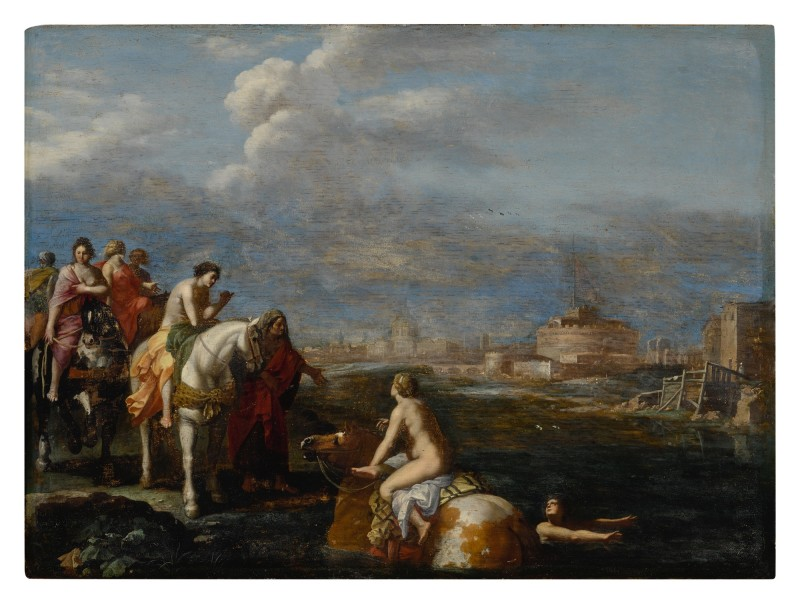
The Flight of Cloelia (1623) by Cornelis van Poelenburgh

Cloelia has been depicted in several paintings and in the libretto Il trionfo di Clelia (1762) by Pietro Metastasio.

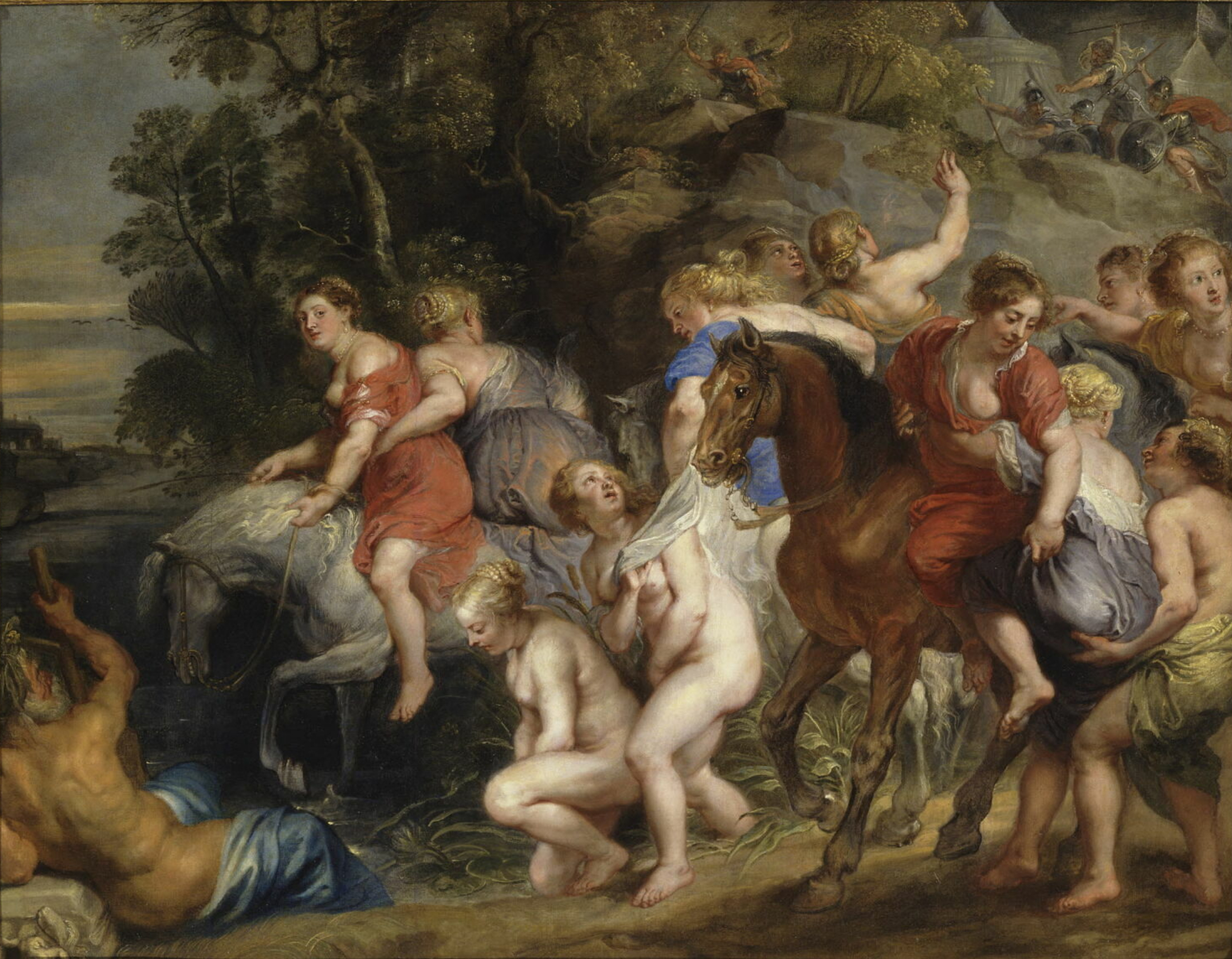
Cloelia Crossing the Tiber (1630/40) by Rubens

She was also portrayed by Sylvia Syms in the 1961 Italian movie Le Vergini di Roma.

== See also ==
- Cloelia gens
- Gaius Mucius Scaevola
- Horatius Cocles

== Sources ==
- Livy, Ab urbe condita, 2.13
- Valerius Maximus, Factorum ac dictorum memorabilium, 3.2.2
