= Facts on the ground =

Geopolitical term

Facts on the ground is a diplomatic and geopolitical term that means the situation in reality as opposed to in the abstract. The term was popularised in the 1970s in discussions of the Israeli–Palestinian conflict to refer to Israeli settlements built in the occupied West Bank, which were intended to establish permanent Israeli footholds in Palestinian territory.

Rashid Khalidi wrote in 2010:

One reason Israel continues to build settlements is that, according to the so-called Clinton parameters laid down in 2000, a final Israeli–Palestinian agreement would grant sovereignty over Jewish-occupied areas to Israel, and Palestinian-inhabited areas to the new Palestinian state. Indeed, well over a decade of failed negotiations have only led to an acceleration of Israel's land grab in the Holy City. Israeli planners have spent this time pushing settlers into heavily Arab-inhabited areas of the city, such as Sheikh Jarrah, Silwan, and Abu Dis, in order to create fresh "facts on the ground"—a tactic used by the Zionist movement for over a century in order to obtain control over more and more of Palestine.

The strategy of "establishing facts on the ground" described as a means to generate normative consequences that add pressure to dispute resolution attempts.

== Definition ==
The term is not a legal concept or a scientific term.

Scottish sociologist Andrew Ross defined it as "Jewish settlements and security infrastructure established prior to any legal recognition". He used the phrase to describe the West Bank barrier and the to vacant Palestinian homes left empty following the 1948 Palestinian expulsion and flight which were then possessed by over 100,000 European Jews who initially arrived as Holocaust refugees.

American historian Josiah Ober explained it as follows: "The "facts" were newly-established Jewish settlements and the "ground" on which they were created lay outside Israel's internationally recognized national borders".

== Origin ==
The earliest use of the phrase found in LexisNexis' newspaper search tool is a 1978 Newsweek article quoting Haim Shaham, a leader of the Shilo settlement project.

== Example uses ==
- In June, 2026, Israeli minister of finance Bezalel Smotrich approved the construction of a Jewish school in Hebron, in the West Bank, saying he is "creating facts on the ground".
- In July, 2026, the Palestinian Authority accused the Israeli government of "imposing facts on the ground" for its plans to seize 100 sites in the West Bank.
- In 2024, Tariq Kenney-Shawa wrote an op-ed for the Los Angeles Times whose title described Israel's strategy in Gaza during the Gaza war as "Create facts on the ground that can’t be undone".

== See also ==
- De facto
- Ex factis jus oritur
- Glossary of French words and expressions in English § Fait accompli
- Ground truth
- Realpolitik
- Revanchism
- Operation Uvda
- Status quo ante bellum
