= Il trionfo di Clelia =

Il trionfo di Clelia is an Italian opera libretto by Metastasio originally written for Johann Adolf Hasse and premiered in Vienna in 1762. Among the many subsequent settings are the setting by Gluck that premiered in Bologna in 1763 and the setting by Josef Mysliveček that premiered in Turin in 1767.
