= Gaius Mucius Scaevola =

6th-century BC Roman youth famous for his bravery

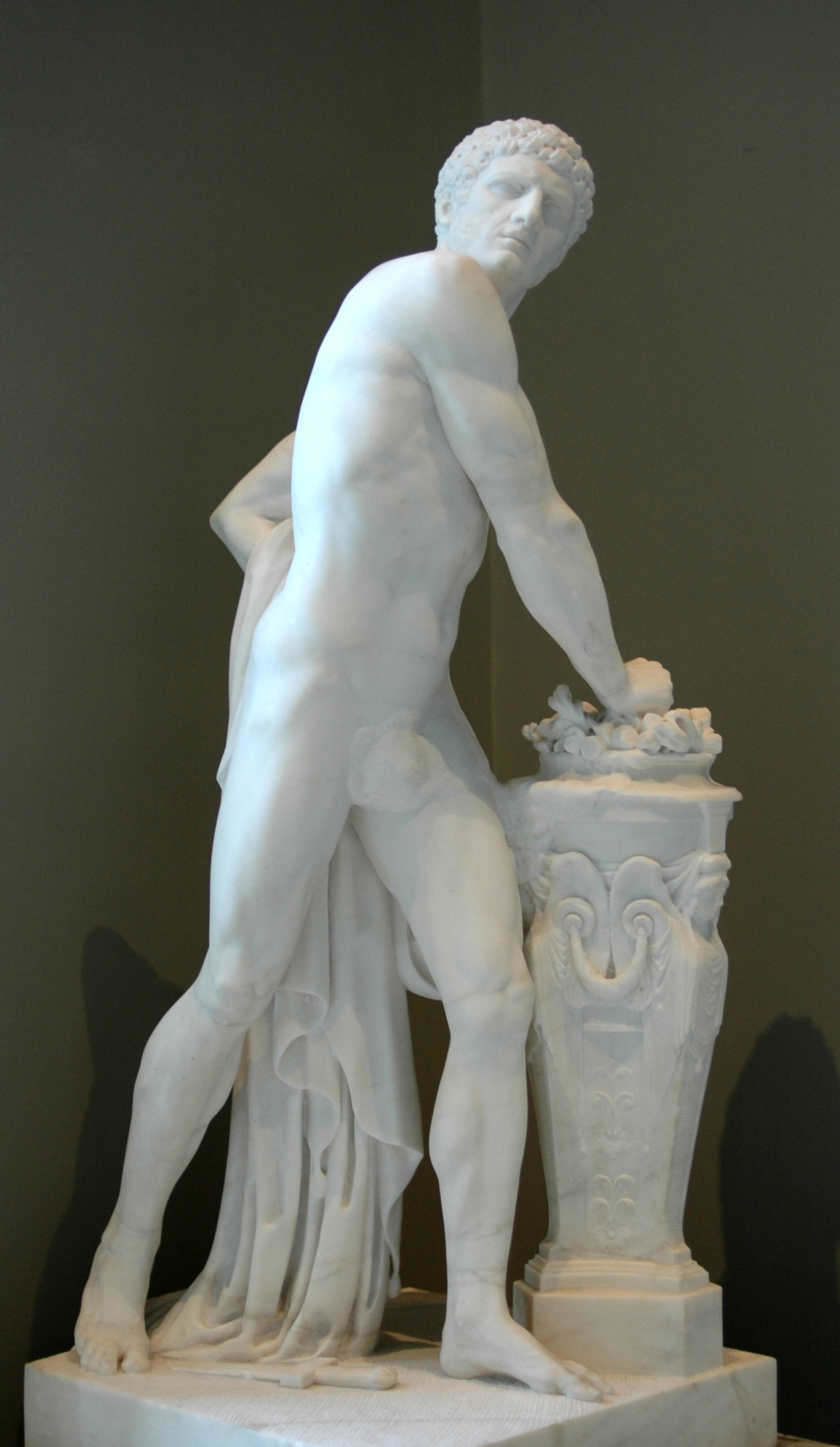
Mucius Scævola by Louis-Pierre Deseine, 1791, Louvre Museum

Gaius Mucius Cordus, better known with his later cognomen Scaevola (/ˈsiːvələ, ˈsɛv-/ SE(E)V-ə-lə, Latin: [ˈskae̯wɔla]), was an ancient Roman youth, possibly mythical, famous for his bravery.

In 508 BC, during the war between Rome and Clusium, the Clusian king Lars Porsena laid siege to Rome. Gaius Mucius Cordus, with the approval of the Roman Senate, sneaked into the Etruscan camp with the intent of assassinating Porsena. Since it was the soldiers' pay day, there were two similarly dressed people, one of whom was the king, on a raised platform speaking to the troops. This caused Mucius to misidentify his target, and he killed Porsena's scribe by mistake. After being captured, he famously declared to Porsena: "I am a Roman citizen, men call me Gaius Mucius. I came here as an enemy to kill my enemy, and I am as ready to die as I am to kill. We Romans act bravely and, when adversity strikes, we suffer bravely." He also declared that he was the first of three hundred Roman youths to volunteer for the task of assassinating Porsena at the risk of losing their own lives.

"Watch", he is said to have declared, "so that you know how cheap the body is to men who have their eye on great glory". Mucius thrust his right hand into a fire which was lit for sacrifice and held it there without giving any indication of pain, thereby earning for himself and his descendants the cognomen Scaevola, meaning "left-handed". Porsena was shocked at the youth's bravery, and dismissed him from the Etruscan camp, free to return to Rome, saying "Go back, since you do more harm to yourself than me". At the same time, the king also sent ambassadors to Rome to offer peace.

Mucius was granted farming land on the right-hand bank of the Tiber, which later became known as the Mucia Prata (Mucian Meadows).

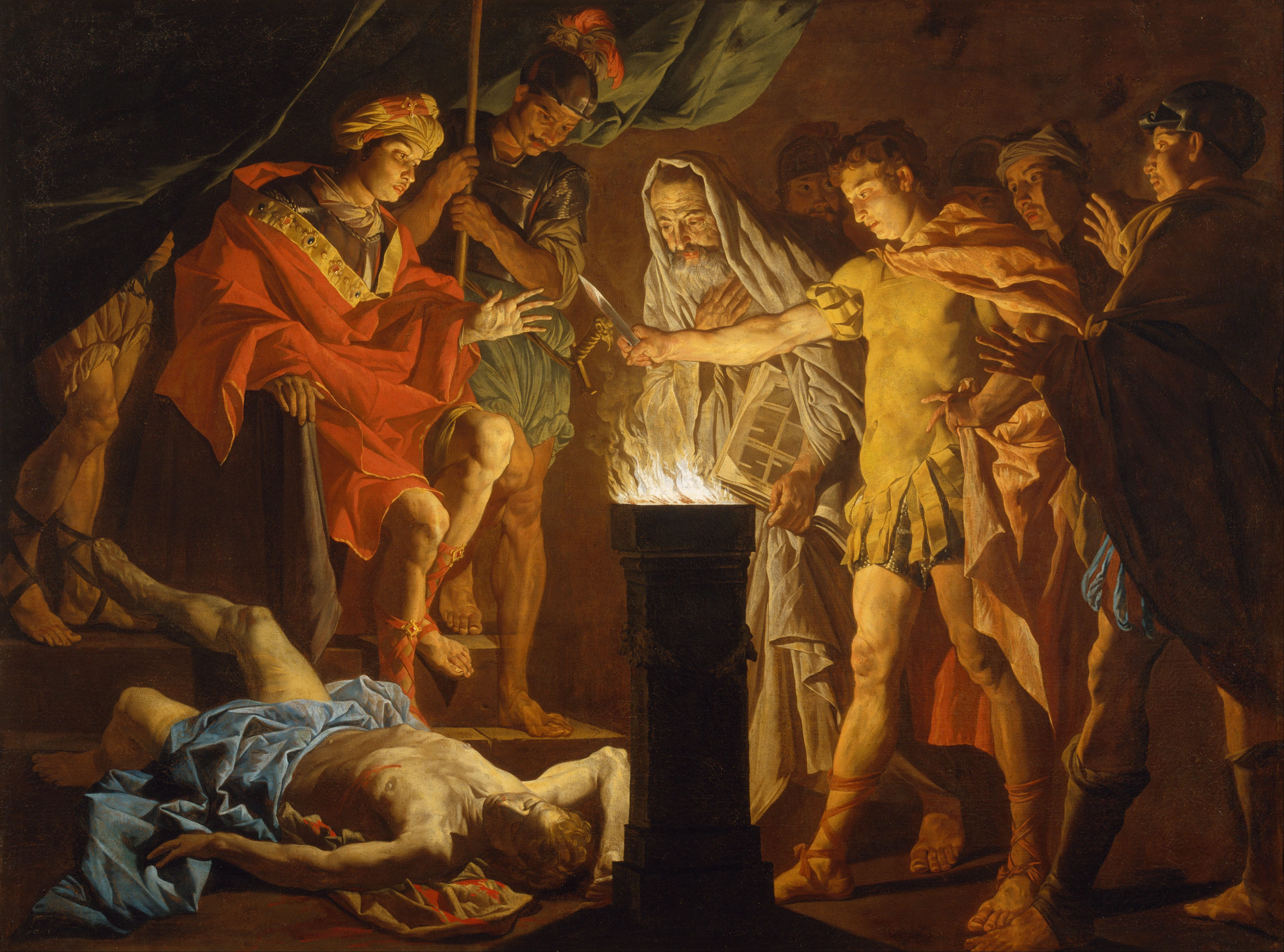
Mucius Scaevola in the Presence of Lars Porsenna by Matthias Stom, (early 1640s), Art Gallery of New South Wales

== In popular culture ==
- Dante Alighieri refers to Mucius and the sacrifice of his hand within the Divine Comedy. In Paradiso Canto 4: 82–87, along with St. Lawrence, Mucius is depicted as a person possessing the rarest and firmest of wills.
- At the end of the first epilogue to War and Peace, young Nikolay Bolkonsky expresses a desire to emulate Mucius Scaevola.
- In a poem in Musa Posthuma, Martha Marchina compared Mucius unfavorably to the martyr Martha and suggests that Martha was the stronger hero because she suffered worse on behalf of God.
- Jean-Jacques Rousseau mentions in Book One of his Confessions that as a child, he attempted to replicate Mucius' action by placing his hand over a chafing dish.
- At the age of twelve, Friedrich Nietzsche, attempting to prove to his classmates at Schulpforta that the story could be true, burnt his outstretched palm over a book of burning matches without expression of pain and was only saved from serious harm by the school's prefect.
- Gordon Scott portrayed Mucius in the sword-and-sandal film Hero of Rome (1964), which was loosely based on this story.
- Since 1991 Spanish cultural association Fuerzas de Choque Extraordinarii from the Carthaginians and Romans festivities of Cartagena has Gaius Mucius Scaevola as their commander.

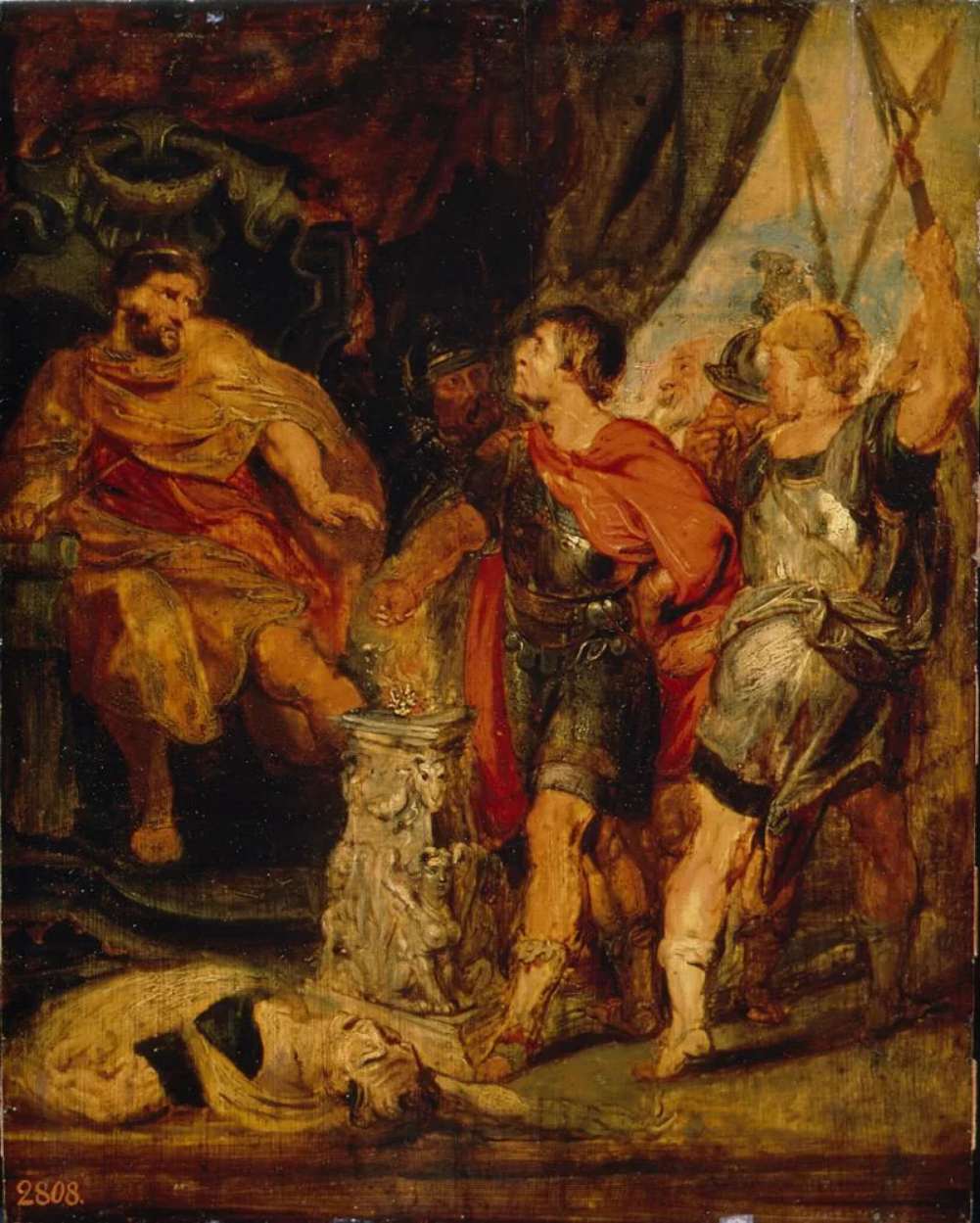
Mucius Scaevola before Lars Porsenna by Peter Paul Rubens, Pushkin Museum

- In the 2022 television series Gaslit, James McCord says to G. Gordon Liddy "Gaius Scaevola would be proud". McCord is referring to an earlier conversation where Liddy describes holding his hand over a candle in order to prove to several Cubans that he was "macho". This was part of a program Liddy followed to develop his willpower.
- In the 2024 animated series Secret Level, a character named "Scaevola" is likely a reference to Mucius. Aside from sharing a name, the character is missing their right hand and displays deep loyalty.
- The British warship HMS Daring (D32) is named for him.

== See also ==
- Cloelia
- Et facere et pati fortia Romanum est
- Mucia (gens)
- Týr
- Tahmuras
