= Lars Porsena =

Etruscan king of Clusium involved in wars against Rome

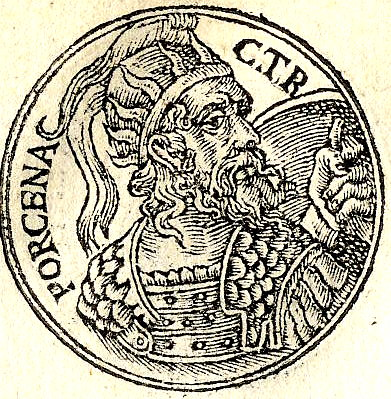
Lars Porsena from the Promptuarii Iconum Insigniorum.

Lars Porsena (or Porsenna; Etruscan: Pursenas) was an Etruscan king known for his war against the city of Rome. He ruled over the city of Clusium (Etruscan: Clevsin; modern Chiusi). There are no established dates for his rule, but Roman sources often place the war at around 508 BC.

== War against Rome ==
Lars Porsena came into conflict with Rome after the revolution that overthrew the monarchy there in 509 BC, resulting in the exile of the semi-legendary last king of Rome, Lucius Tarquinius Superbus. The deposed monarch, whose family was of Etruscan origin, tried and failed to retake the throne a number of times before appealing to Porsena for assistance, since at that time Clusium was said to be a very powerful Etruscan city.

At this point, however, the histories diverge. According to most mainstream Roman accounts, including Livy, Porsena attacked and besieged Rome, but was sufficiently impressed by particular acts of Roman bravery in defending the city that he chose to make peace. Other accounts, however, suggest that Porsena was at least partially successful in subduing the city. None of the accounts, however, suggests that Tarquinius Superbus was returned to the throne. Thus, if Lars Porsena did indeed capture Rome, he may have done so with the intent of controlling it himself, not restoring the former dynasty.

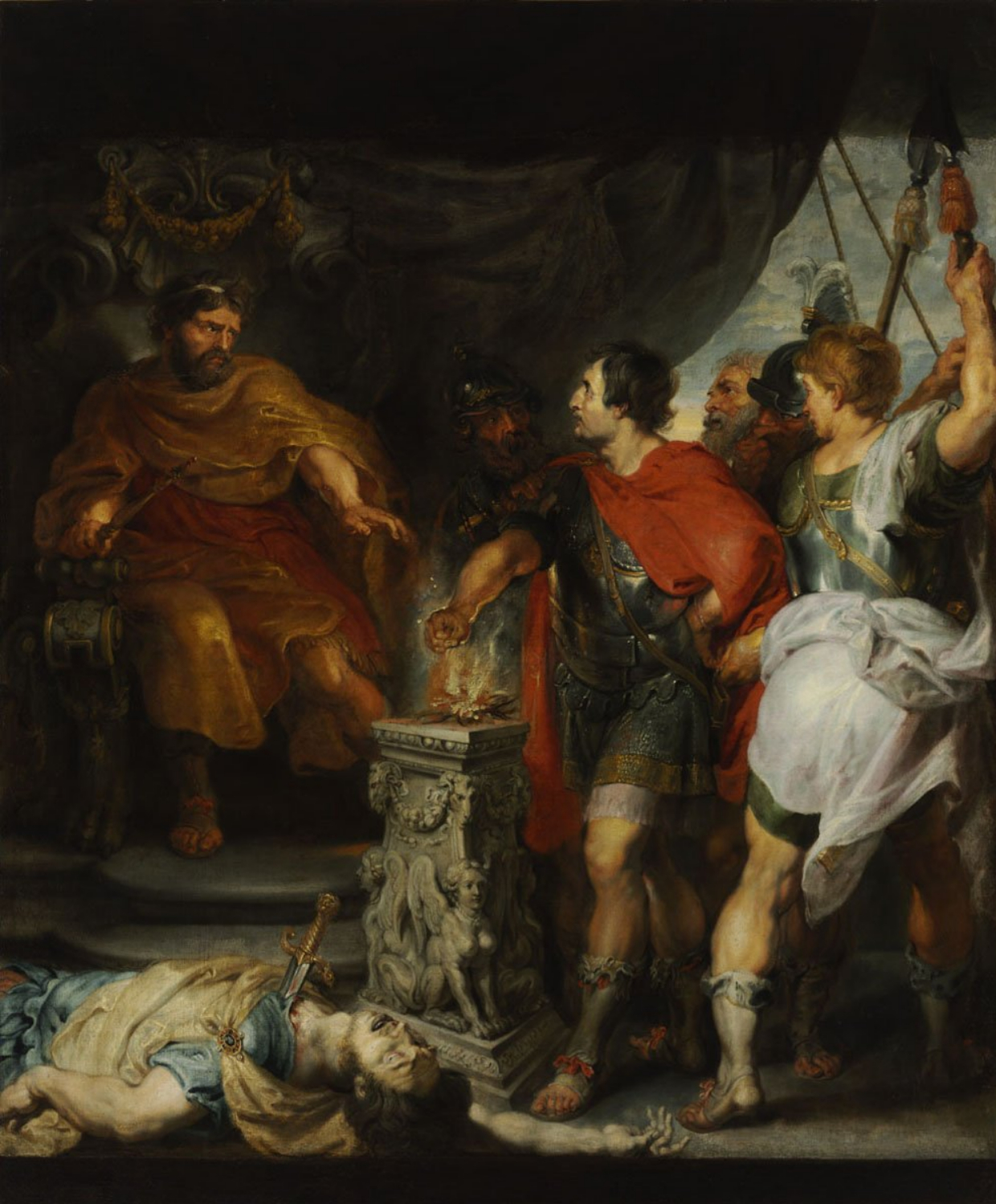
Mucius Scaevola before Lars Porsenna (1620s) by Rubens and van Dyck.

Accounts of the war include a number of matters directly concerning Porsena. One story tells that, during his siege of Rome, a Roman youth named Gaius Mucius sneaked into the Etruscan camp with the approval of the Senate, intent on assassinating Porsena. He was captured after killing Porsena's richly-dressed secretary, whom he had mistaken for the king. Mucius defiantly told the Etruscans that some other Roman would succeed in assassinating Porsena. To prove his valour, he then thrust his right hand into a sacrificial fire, thereby earning for himself and his descendants the cognomen Scaevola ("lefty"). Astonished and impressed by the young man's courage, Porsena freed Mucius, and, according to Livy, sought peace by treaty immediately afterward.

Another tale of the war concerns the Roman hostages taken by Porsena as part of the treaty. One of the hostages, a young woman named Cloelia, fled the Etruscan camp, leading away a group of Roman virgins. Porsena demanded that she be returned, and the Romans consented. On her return, however, Porsena was so impressed by her bravery that he asked her to choose half the remaining hostages to be freed. She selected all the youngest Roman boys. Afterwards it was said that the Romans gave Cloelia the unusual honour of a statue at the top of the Via Sacra, on the way to the Palatium, showing Cloelia mounted on a horse—that is, as an eques, though the statue is also said to be of Valeria.

Livy also recounts that during his own time, public auctions of goods at Rome were by tradition referred to as "selling the goods of king Porsena", and that this somehow relates to the war with Clusium. Livy concludes most likely it is because, when Porsena departed Rome, he left behind as a gift for the Romans his stores of provisions. Plutarch states "Porsenna, thus reconciled to the Romans, gave them a fresh instance of his generosity, and commanded his soldiers to quit the camp merely with their arms, leaving their tents, full of corn and other stores, as a gift to the Romans. Hence, even down to our time, when there is a public sale of goods, they cry Porsenna’s first, by way of perpetual commemoration of his kindness".

In 507 BC, Porsena once again sent ambassadors to the Roman senate, requesting the restoration of Tarquinius to the throne. Legates were sent back to Porsena, to advise him that the Romans would never re-admit Tarquinius, and that Porsena should out of respect for the Romans cease requesting Tarquinius' readmittance. Porsena agreed, even asking Tarquinius to continue his exile outside Clusium. Porsena also restored to the Romans their hostages, and also the lands of Veii that had been taken from Rome by treaty. Livy records that, by these matters, a faithful peace between Porsena and Rome was created. A simple and plain brazen statue of Porsenna stood in Rome, by the Senate House.

== War with Aricia ==
In 508 BC, after the siege of Rome, Porsena split his forces and sent part of the Clusian army with his son Aruns to besiege the Latin city of Aricia. The Aricians in turn sent for assistance from the Latin League and from Cumae, and the Clusian army was defeated in battle.

== Tomb ==
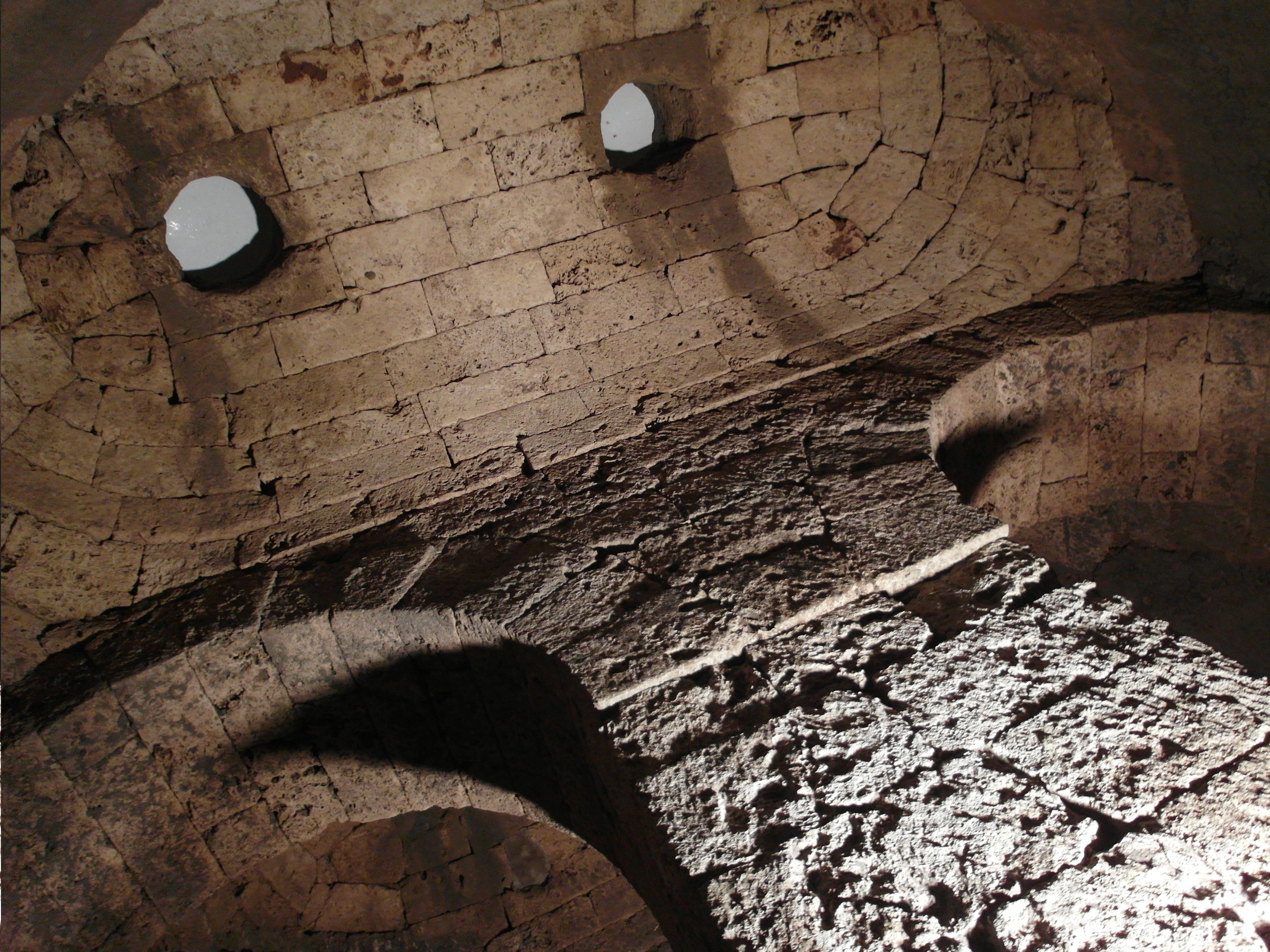
Etruscan-Roman reservoir in Chiusi, purported Tomb of Lars Porsena

According to most accounts, Lars Porsena was buried in an elaborate tomb in (or under) the city he ruled. Pliny the Elder describes Porsena's tomb as having a 50 Roman foot high rectangular base with sides 300 feet long (approx. 15 x 89 m). It was adorned by pyramids in three tiers and massive bronze bells hanging from the pyramids in chains.

Porsena's tomb would have been razed to the ground together with the rest of the city of Clusium in 89 BC by the Roman general Cornelius Sulla.

== Reception ==
The story of Lars Porsenna and the Roman hostage Cloelia is the basis of the libretto Il trionfo di Clelia (1762) by Pietro Metastasio. The French writer Madeleine de Scudéry wrote Clélie in 1661.

Lays of Ancient Rome (1842) by Thomas Babington Macaulay tells the legendary story of the Roman Horatius defending the bridge into Rome against Lars Porsena's oncoming Etruscan army.

Robert Graves' I, Claudius (1934) features a fictional conversation between the emperor-to-be Claudius and the historians Livy and Pollio about the accuracy of Livy's histories, specifically bringing up the questions of whether Lars Porsena took Rome, and whether the story about Scaevola is true. The Etruscan king also supplies the title of Graves' essay Lars Porsena or The Future of Swearing and Improper Language (1927).

Porsenna in fiction:

- Lisle, Thomas (1782). "The History of Porsenna, King of Russia: In Two Books". A Collection of Poems in Six Volumes. Vol. 6. London: J. Dodsley. pp. 194–216.

== Sources ==
- Evans, John Karl (1980). Plebs Rustica. The Peasantry of Classical Italy I: the Peasantry in Modern Scholarship.
- Evans, John Karl (1991). War, Women and Children in Ancient Rome. Routledge.
