= Emimmo Salvi =

Italian film producer, screenwriter and director

- Emimmo Salvi in The Giant of Metropolis (1961)
- Born: Domenico Salvi; 23 January 1926; Rome, Kingdom of Italy
- Occupations: Film producer, screenwriter, production manager, film director

Emimmo Salvi (born Domenico Salvi; 23 January 1926 in Rome) was an Italian film producer, director, screenwriter and production manager.

He directed Italian low-budget genre films, particularly mythological peplum films, oriental adventure films and spaghetti westerns. He also acted as a producer and worked on the stories or screenplays of most of these films.

Earlier, Salvi had produced and co-written several peplum and adventure films, among them Goliath and the Barbarians, whose American release became an important early commercial success for American International Pictures (AIP). His early productions also included David e Golia, starring Orson Welles, and the science-fiction peplum The Giant of Metropolis.

Frequent collaborators were actors Gordon Mitchell, Bella Cortez and Furio Meniconi, and cinematographers Bitto Albertini and Mario Parapetti.

Film historians have interpreted Salvi's work in terms of a cinefumetto aesthetic, shaped by the visual and narrative conventions of comic strips.

== Career ==
=== Early production work (1949–1958) ===
Salvi began working in film production on Yvonne la Nuit (1949). Over the following decade he held various production posts, including production secretary on Roberto Rossellini's The Flowers of St. Francis, and production supervisor on Rossellini's Journey to Italy and on Federico Fellini's Nights of Cabiria.

=== Producer and screenwriter (1958–1961) ===
==== Sorrisi e canzoni (1958) ====
In 1958, Salvi organised the production of Sorrisi e canzoni for Transfilm. The musical comedy combines a romantic plot with songs and revue sketches. It starred Giulia Rubini, Maria Fiore and Gabriele Tinti and was directed by Luigi Capuano.

==== Capitan Fuoco (1958) and Il terrore dei barbari (1959) ====
Salvi wrote the stories of two adventure films together with Gino Mangini and produced them: Capitan Fuoco (1958) and Il terrore dei barbari (1959). Both films were directed by Carlo Campogalliani, a veteran of silent cinema then in his early seventies.

On Capitan Fuoco, Salvi was responsible for the general organisation and production, again for Transfilm. Set in late thirteenth-century Italy, the swashbuckler starred Lex Barker as a Robin Hood-like outlaw who protects villagers from a tyrannical baron. For this film, Isabella Comino also contributed to the story. On 4 September 1958, Corriere dell’Informazione reported that filming of Capitan Fuoco had begun that morning. It was released on 22 December 1958.

On Il terrore dei barbari, starring Steve Reeves and Chelo Alonso, Salvi handled production and distribution for Standard Production (Rome). Set during the Lombard invasion of Italy in 568, the film follows Emiliano, a villager of exceptional strength who leads a resistance group after his father's murder and falls in love with the daughter of a Lombard commander. Della Casa and Giusti describe the film, together with Rosmunda e Alboino (1961), as inaugurating a cycle of Italian barbarian adventures. Filming took place in Yugoslavia and at Incir-De Paolis Studios in Rome.

When the production encountered financial difficulties before completion, AIP executives Samuel Z. Arkoff and James H. Nicholson viewed footage in Rome and supplied 20,000 US dollars to finish the film. For its US release, AIP retitled it Goliath and the Barbarians and replaced the original score by Carlo Innocenzi with music by Les Baxter. The film was also reduced from 100 to 85 minutes. AIP completion money enabled it to reach US theatres in November 1959, five months after Hercules, which had made Steve Reeves a star. It was one of AIP's largest-grossing releases up to that time, and its returns helped rescue the financially troubled company.

In Italy, the film had already been released on 30 June 1959. Della Casa and Giusti report Italian box-office receipts of 641 million lire and a fourth-place ranking, adding that receipts had reached 731 million lire by the end of 1961.

==== Films with Orson Welles: David e Golia (1960) and I tartari (1961) ====
Salvi then produced and co-wrote the screenplay for David e Golia (1960), directed by Richard Pottier and Ferdinando Baldi and starring Orson Welles as Saul. Salvi reportedly persuaded Welles to participate and built the film around his name. They recount, explicitly as a Roman film-industry legend, that Salvi obtained Welles's signature with a promissory note unsupported by funds, then crossed from Welles's hotel to the offices of Angelo Rizzoli and secured financing for the film. They also cite contemporary accounts placing Salvi's visit to Welles at his villa in Fregene, where Welles reportedly received him in swimming trunks with a cigar. Location filming took place in Jerusalem and Yugoslavia, with interiors made at the Safa-Palatino and the De Paolis studios in Rome. In 1959, Salvi commissioned special effects artist Carlo Rambaldi to make a giant dummy in Goliath's likeness. Rambaldi also made a vest with artificial muscles for the actor playing Goliath. Hughes regards the film as now principally remembered for Welles's performance. Welles directed his own scenes. Audrey Stainton, who worked as Welles's secretary during the filming of David e Golia, recalled that Welles requested additional performers and sets for his scenes, increasing Salvi's costs, and that Welles, in turn, used income from his acting work to continue his own Don Quixote project. David e Golia proved to be a success at the box office.

Salvi then launched I tartari (1961), directed by Richard Thorpe, and secured both Welles's contract and an agreement with the Yugoslav company Jadran Film. The Italian film archive ANICA lists Salvi among the credited story and screenplay writers. The film was a collaboration with the Zagreb company Dubrava Film, Yugoslav location work and interiors at Titanus Studios. According to production manager Alessandro Tasca di Cutò, Welles had agreed to appear in the film as a favour to Salvi. Tasca recalled that Salvi lacked sufficient capital and that the large sets being built in Zagreb were delayed. With the project having passed to Lux Film, Tasca said that he could not recommend the completion guarantee requested by its American financiers and agreed to take over production management only if Salvi was removed; Welles remained in the cast as the Tartar leader Burundai.

==== Le sette sfide (1961) and Il gigante di Metropolis (1961) ====
After having left I tartari before completion, Salvi produced Le sette sfide (1961), for which he had written the story. The film starred Ed Fury and was directed by Primo Zeglio, with exteriors again being filmed in Yugoslavia. Set in medieval Russia, the film follows Ivan (Ed Fury), a Circassian leader, and his rival Amok (Furio Meniconi). The Great Khan orders them to settle their dispute in seven contests. When Ivan is wounded by an arrow in the final contest, Amok seizes power, and Ivan rallies the tribes against him.

Salvi then produced and co-wrote Il gigante di Metropolis (1961), an unusual hybrid of peplum and science fiction. Set in 20,000 BC, the film follows Obro (Gordon Mitchell), who is taken captive in the technologically advanced city of Metropolis. He tries to stop King Yotar (Roldano Lupi) from transplanting his father's brain into his young son as a cataclysm threatens the city. Mitchell later recalled the film as more Salvi's work than that of its credited director, Umberto Scarpelli.

=== Director (1962–1967) ===
Between 1962 and 1967, Salvi directed two mythological and two oriental adventures, a eurospy film, a musical comedy and two westerns.

==== Two films with Rod Flash Ilush: Greco-Roman mythology and Persian adventure (1962) ====
At the beginning of his directorial career, Salvi worked with Iranian actor and athlete Iloosh Khoshabe on two films, Vulcano figlio di Giove (Vulcano figlio di Giove) and Le 7 fatiche di Alì Babà (Le 7 fatiche di Alì Babà), both released in 1962.

Film scholar Mohammad Foad Abachi records that Khoshabe travelled to Italy at the invitation of producer Manouchehr Zamani. Credited under the pseudonym Rod Flash Ilush, Khoshabe starred as the titular characters in both films.

Vulcano figlio di Giove (1962) was Salvi's credited directorial debut, for which he wrote the story and co-wrote the screenplay. Della Casa and Giusti also credit him as a producer, whereas Kinnard and Crnkovich instead name Spartaco Antonucci as producer and Decio Salvi as executive producer; a credit summary in Nocturno Dossier identifies Ambrogio Molteni as producer for Juno Film.

Della Casa and Giusti describe it as an Italian production made in association with Manouchehr Zamani in Iran, and state that sits exterior scenes were filmed both in Iran and at Tor Caldara, while the interiors were made at the Interstudio in Grottaferrata. Kinnard and Crnkovich call it the first peplum filmed in Iran. In a 2020 interview, however, actress Bella Cortez disputed reports that the film had been shot in Iran, stating that she had not travelled there. She added that Iranian magazines had published inaccurate reports because of the involvement of the film's star, Rod Flash.

Salvi's second film as director was the fantasy adventure Le 7 fatiche di Alì Babà, with Rod Flash again in the title role. Salvi wrote the story and co-wrote the screenplay with Ambrogio Molteni and Benito Ilforte. The film was produced by Avis Film. In the film, Ali Baba is sent to deliver a golden crown to Hassam, whose people have been defeated by the tyrant Mustafà (Furio Meniconi). When Hassam agrees to surrender his people's treasure to spare them, Ali Baba suspects a trick and tries to negotiate with Mustafà, who has him imprisoned and tortured. Loto (Bella Cortez), Hassam's daughter and Mustafà's betrothed, helps Ali Baba escape, who then defeats Mustafà. At the end of the film, Ali Baba declares, "Freedom is my ideal. I have fought for it and will fight for it as long as I live."

==== Eurospy in Istanbul and another oriental adventure (1963-1964) ====
As his third film, Salvi directed and co-wrote the eurospy film F.B.I. chiama Istanbul starring Ken Clark and Bella Cortez. FBI agent Robert Liston (Clark) investigates a drug-smuggling ring operating in Europe and the Middle East whose members are killing off associates they no longer trust. With the help of Manuela (Cortez), a dancer with ties to the smugglers, he traces the gang's leader to a villa. Liston breaks up the ring with the help of the Turkish police. It was shot mostly on location in Istanbul and had its Italian premiere on 10 February 1964. In her 2020 interview, Bella Cortez remembered having stayed three months in Istanbul for the shoot.

Salvi then acted as director, story writer and co-screenwriter of Sinbad contro i sette saraceni. The rebel Yeriti send Sinbad (Dan Harrison) to represent them in a tournament that will decide who rules the city of Cufra. Princess Fatma (Bella Cortez) saves him from the soldiers of the city's ruler, Omar (Gordon Mitchell), and she and Sinbad fall in love. As Sinbad faces Omar in the tournament, the enslaved women in Omar's harem escape and the Yeriti enter the city to join the uprising against him. Hughes specifically praises Mitchell's performance as the villain.

==== Germanic mythology, westerns and musicarello (1965-1967) ====
For Il tesoro della foresta pietrificata (1965), a fantasy adventure drawing on the Nibelung sagas, Salvi is credited as director, co-screenwriter and story writer. In the film, Wotan entrusts Sigmund (Ivo Payer) and Brunilde (Pamela Tudor), queen of the Valkyries, with guarding a golden sword and the treasure of the Nibelungs. Acting on the advice of the witch Odrun, the Viking leader Hunding (Gordon Mitchell) leads his army through the Black Forest to seize them. Sigmund retreats to the Petrified Valley, where he holds off the Vikings with the help of the Valkyries and kills Hunding in a duel. Alex Rallo noted that Salvi omits familiar protagonists of the Nibelung legend, including Siegfried, and centres the film on the struggle for the treasure itself. Vignati singled out the film among Salvi's adventure films for its darker, more restrained and more romantic tone.

Salvi's first western, 3 colpi di Winchester per Ringo (1966), paired former bodybuilders Gordon Mitchell and Mickey Hargitay. The gunmen Ringo Carson (Hargitay) and Frank Sanders (Mitchell) rescue Jane Walcom (Milla Sannoner) from bandits but part ways after falling in love with her. Ringo marries Jane and becomes sheriff. When a clash with Frank's gang of former Confederate soldiers leaves Ringo blind, Frank takes his place as sheriff. Frank and a banker take Jane and her son hostage to force Ringo to reveal where he has hidden some mining shares, but Ringo regains his sight and fights back.

Salvi also directed and co-wrote Un gangster venuto da Brooklyn (1966), which gave singer Little Tony his first leading film role. In the film, retired Brooklyn gangster Joe Montano (Akim Tamiroff) settles in Rome and plans to replace the building that houses the Buratti brothers' nightclub with a skyscraper. When the brothers refuse to leave, Montano buys up their debts and threatens them with legal action. The brothers steal the promissory notes, and Montano prepares to raid the club with his men. Meanwhile, his niece Julie O'Brien (Evi Marandi) falls in love with Giorgio Buratti (Little Tony), and their relationship brings the two sides to an agreement. A report published while the film was being shot used the variant title Un gangster arriva da Brooklyn and described Akim Tamiroff's character as a retired Brooklyn crime boss who becomes involved in Roman property speculation, unscrupulous lawyers and a fashionable nightclub driven by yé-yé rhythms. According to Little Tony biographer Mario Galeotti, the financially troubled production asked the singer to contribute his own money so that filming could continue and the film could be completed; he agreed, receiving no fee and ultimately paying out of pocket. Giusti described it as the least-known of Little Tony's musicarelli and attributed its obscurity partly to a poorly timed August release.

Salvi then directed and co-wrote his second and last western, Wanted Johnny Texas (1967). A Texas Rangers colonel (Fernando Sancho) recruits Johnny Texas (James Newman) to reopen a pass that O'Connor (Howard Ross) and his gang have blocked to wagon trains. Johnny initially secures safe passage by offering payment, but O'Connor soon resumes his attacks. Lucia Cansino (Monica Brugger), an undercover agent, brings Johnny the detonators he needs to blow up the gang's hideout. A March 1968 review in Il Resto del Carlino praised the film for leaving its violent protagonist unredeemed. In a retrospective review, Weisser describes Wanted Johnny Texas (1967) as aesthetically strange and so atypical that it might be regarded as either among the best or among the worst examples of the form.

=== Return to directing (1978-?) ===
==== Pugni, dollari e spinaci ====
After an interval of more than a decade, Salvi returned to directing with Pugni, dollari e spinaci (1978), a comedy inspired by American cartoons and centred on a spinach merchant devoted to Popeye. In the film, Sammy Mannia (Maurizio Arena), a spinach grower who looks to Popeye for guidance, refuses to sell his farm to Frank Stilo (Gordon Mitchell). Stilo pressures him by having the farm's debts called in. The dispute culminates in a bout between Sammy's ally Jo Monumento and Stilo's champion Leo Coppola, with the farm at stake. In a contemporary interview, Salvi said that distributors had initially been sceptical that an Italian production could live up to the premise. Salvi stressed that the film was not animated, but a live-action fable whose world was inspired by American cartoons, and said that he had completed it despite this pessimism. A subsequent report announcing the film's presentation at the 31st Salone Internazionale dell'Umorismo in Bordighera described it as the first live-action film about Popeye and named Maurizio Arena and Gordon Mitchell among its cast. The film's story and screenplay were credited to Maria Carla Bufalino, with Salvi also credited for the screenplay in a surviving ministerial censorship document. At the 31st Salone Internazionale dell'Umorismo in Bordighera, the film received a Rama di Palma d'Oro. Giusti reported that actor Gordon Mitchell, who acted as the villain, was particularly fond of it.

==== The Zeus project ====
In the early 1980s, Salvi again collaborated with Maria Carla Bufalino on a project combining science fiction and mythology, known as Zeus and also promoted as Zeus contro l'universo. The Centro Sperimentale di Cinematografia's Biblioteca Luigi Chiarini holds a screenplay titled Zeus, catalogued under Bufalino's name. A surviving sketch for the project is dated 1982.

Film historian Hervé Dumont dates the proposed production of Zeus contro l'universo to 1983 and names Gordon Mitchell among the intended cast. Giusti also lists the project under 1983, citing the French fanzine Nostalgia, which suggested that it might have re-edited footage from Vulcano figlio di Giove. Giusti noted that the project did not appear in any Italian film catalogue and questioned whether it had been completed or released. Della Casa and Giusti separately report that, shortly before his death, Salvi announced a remake of Vulcano figlio di Giove with Mitchell, who said that some footage from the earlier film was to be reused.

In a 1990 interview, Mitchell recalled a lengthy period of technical preparation for Zeus and said that a production meeting was imminent. In a 1998 interview, he said that "some scenes were shot", but that Salvi died before the film was completed.

== Frequent collaborators ==
Gordon Mitchell first collaborated with Salvi as the heroic lead in The Giant of Metropolis (1961), before playing villains in five films directed by Salvi, usually as the main antagonist. He was also to act in Zeus, Salvi's last, unfinished project.

Actress Bella Cortez starred in seven of Salvi's films. She started with his work as producer in I tartari up until his second Arabian nights adventure, Simbad contro i sette saraceni.

In a 2020 interview, she describes how she met Salvi at the De Paolis studios in Rome, after which he invited her to his office and helped launch her film career. According to Cortez, Salvi chose her screen name and selected many of her roles. She also said that he engaged the choreographer Leo Coleman and incorporated dances into several of the films in which she appeared.

In the interview, Cortez also recalled that she and Salvi had been engaged: he had given her a ring and she had bought a wedding dress. She also recalled that his film productions had accumulated debts, which she estimated at 400 million lire, and said that the financial scandal contributed to their separation. In her autobiography, she placed the end of their personal relationship after her return from the filming of F.B.I. chiama Istanbul in Turkey. Despite their separation, they worked together again on Simbad contro i sette saraceni. Cortez wrote that Salvi offered her the role several months after their relationship ended and that she completed the film despite an injury during production.

== Death ==
A 1998 profile based on an interview with actor Gordon Mitchell placed Salvi's death in the early 1980s.

In an interview conducted by William Connolly and Tom Betts on 1 April 1990, Mitchell recalled that Salvi telephoned him from hospital and spoke enthusiastically about meeting a producer for Zeus the next morning. Mitchell said that he learned the following day that Salvi had died by suicide, having been diagnosed with diabetes.

According to a 2011 blog post by Tom Betts, Mitchell had told him that Salvi had died in 1989.

== Style and recurring features ==
In a 1998 interview, Salvi's friend Gordon Mitchell, who appeared in several of Salvi's films, described him as a genius at making films economically, saying that he “knew all the tricks of the trade”, and affectionately called him a rogue. Della Casa and Giusti characterize Salvi as a home-grown “king of the Zs”.

=== Narrative patterns and themes ===
Rinaldo Vignati argued that the shift from Greek mythology to Ali Baba's Arabia was apparent chiefly in the costumes, while the plots, characters and dialogue changed little. He noted several recurring elements in Salvi's adventure films, including supernatural episodes, a dwarf character and a lengthy final battle.

=== Comic-strip aesthetics ===
Film historians Stefano Piselli, Antonio Bruschini and Riccardo Morrocchi interpret several films associated with Salvi in terms of a cinefumetto aesthetic: a form of genre cinema shaped by the visual and narrative language of comic strips. They describe Vulcano figlio di Giove (1962) as having a naïve, fantastical comic-strip style, reinforced by its bizarre creatures, and argued that Salvi's second western Wanted Johnny Texas (1967) develops this eccentric comic-strip aesthetic further through comic-like costumes, theatrical dialogue and dances, unusual imagery and exaggerated violence.

Similarly, Roger A. Fratter characterized Vulcano figlio di Giove as deliberately childlike and comic-strip-like. A contemporary review of Salvi's F.B.I. chiama Istambul stated that the tone and technique were modelled on comic strips.

In 1978, Salvi himself made the comic-strip inspiration explicit, discussing his own film Pugni, dollari e spinaci. He said that its characters were conceived and performed like American comic-book heroes, whose extraordinary actions belonged to the “magical unreality” of comic strips. Quoting an unnamed scholar's description of comics as the “proletarian novels of America”, Salvi argued that their paradoxical deformation led to the moral of a fable and, by grotesquely reversing reality, revealed what lay behind appearances and indicated “the path to follow in order to win one's own dignity”.

=== Genre hybridity ===
In Il gigante di Metropolis (1961), which Salvi produced, peplum conventions are combined with science fiction. Kinnard and Crnkovich liken its mixture of primitive and futuristic elements to Universal's 1930s Flash Gordon serials, while Hughes emphasizes its volcanic landscape, “Bavaesque” underground imagery, elaborate sets and matte shots. Michele Giordano described Giorgio Giovannini's vaguely surreal sets as anticipating those of Star Trek.

Piselli, Bruschini and Morrocchi interpret Tre colpi di Winchester per Ringo (1966) as a peplum–western hybrid, citing its catacomb-like settings, terse dialogue and character poses reminiscent of panels in the western comic Tex. Hughes similarly describes it as a hybrid between western, Gothic horror and peplum. Matt Blake identifies continuities with Salvi's earlier work in its red-and-green lighting, eccentric set design, inserted dance sequence and exaggerated performances.

== Filmography ==
The filmography is based principally on Poppi's biographical entry and Matt Blake's detailed chronology, supplemented by the specialist sources cited for individual films. Job titles in the early production credits are English renderings of Italian production roles and may vary in other sources.

Year	Title	Credit(s)
1949	Yvonne la Nuit	Production secretary, credited as Mimmo Salvi
1950	Francesco, giullare di Dio	Production secretary
1950	Prima comunione	Production supervisor, credited as Mimmo Salvi
1951	Amor non ho... però... però	Production secretary
1951	La famiglia Passaguai	Production assistant
1952	La famiglia Passaguai fa fortuna	Production assistant
1952	Cinque poveri in automobile	Production supervisor
1953	Gelosia	Production supervisor
1953	Una di quelle	Production secretary, credited as Mimmo Salvi
1953	Ti ho sempre amato!	Production supervisor
1954	Pietà per chi cade	Production supervisor
1954	Appassionatamente	Production supervisor
1954	Viaggio in Italia	Production supervisor, credited as Mimmo Salvi
1954	Le due orfanelle	Production supervisor
1955	Non c'è amore più grande	Production supervisor
1955	Io piaccio	Production supervisor
1955	Gli innamorati	Production supervisor, credited as Mimmo Salvi
1956	Il bigamo	Production manager
1957	Le notti di Cabiria	Production supervisor
1957	Agguato a Tangeri	Production supervisor
1958	Romanzo di un giovane povero	Production manager
1958	Le dritte	Production manager

=== As producer and director ===
Original title	English title	Director	Story	Screenplay	Cinematography	Production	Production company	Italian release date
Sorrisi e canzoni		Luigi Capuano			Augusto Tiezzi	Emimmo Salvi (producer)	Transfilm Importazione Esportazione Produzione Film	13 Aug 1958
Capitan Fuoco	Captain Falcon	Carlo Campogalliani	Gino Mangini, Isabella Comini, Emimmo Salvi		Bitto Albertini	Emimmo Salvi (production manager and general organisation)	Transfilm Importazione Esportazione Produzione Film	22 Dec 1958
Il terrore dei barbari (1959)	Goliath and the Barbarians	Carlo Campogalliani	Gino Mangini, Emimmo Salvi	G. Mangini, Nino Stresa, C. Campogalliani, Giuseppe Taffarei	Bitto Albertini	Emimmo Salvi (producer and general organisation as well as distribution)	Standard Produzione	30 Jun 1959
David e Golia (1960)	David and Goliath	Ferdinando Baldi, supervised by Richard Pottier	Emimmo Salvi	Emimmo Salvi	Bitto Albertini	Emimmo Salvi (producer)	Ansa Produzione / Dubrava Film (Zagreb, Yugoslavia)	22 Jan 1960
I tartari (1961)	The Tartars	Richard Thorpe. Ferdinando Baldi is wrongly credited in the Italian version.	Emimmo Salvi	Emimmo Salvi	Amerigo Gengarelli		Lux Film / Dubrava Film (Zagreb, Yugoslavia)	30 Mar 1961
Le sette sfide (1961)	The Seven Revenges	Primo Zeglio	Emimmo Salvi	Emimmo Salvi	Bitto Albertini	Emimmo Salvi (producer)	Adelphia Compagnia Cinematografica / Dubrava Film (Zagreb, Yugoslavia)	01 Apr 1961
Il gigante di Metropolis	The Giant of Metropolis	Umberto Scarpelli	Gino Stafford	Sabatino Ciuffini / Oreste Palella / Ambrogio Molteni / Gino Stafford / Emimmo Salvi (screenplay and dialogue)	Oberdan Troiani	Emimmo Salvi / Ugo Rossetti (uncredited)	Centro Produzione S.p.a. (Roma)	26 Oct 1961
Vulcano figlio di Giove	Vulcan, Son of Giove	Emimmo Salvi	Emimmo Salvi	Ambrogio Molteni / Gino Stafford / Benito Ilforte / Emimmo Salvi	Mario Parapetti	Ambrogio Molteni / Emimmo Salvi / Zamani Manucher (Iran)	Juno Produzione	17 Mar 1962
Le 7 fatiche di Alì Babà (1962)	Ali Baba and the Sacred Crown / The Seven Tasks of Ali Baba	Emimmo Salvi		Emimmo Salvi	Mario Parapetti	Emimmo Salvi (producer)	Avis Film	25 Oct 1962
it:FBI chiama Istanbul (1964)		Emimmo Salvi	Emimmo Salvi	Emimmo Salvi	Mario Parapetti		Aussicht Produzione / Samy Mordo, Istanbul	16 Feb 1964
Sinbad contro i sette saraceni (1964)	Ali Baba and the Seven Saracens	Emimmo Salvi	Emimmo Salvi	Emimmo Salvi	Mario Parapetti	Emimmo Salvi (producer)	Avis Film	18 Dec 1964
Il tesoro della foresta pietrificata (1965); Salvi also credited with casting.	Treasure of the Petrified Forest	Emimmo Salvi	Emimmo Salvi	Emimmo Salvi	Mario Parapetti	Emimmo Salvi (producer)	Asteria Film / Olga Chart	13 Jun 1965
Tre colpi di Winchester per Ringo (1966)	Three Bullets for Ringo	Emimmo Salvi		Emimmo Salvi	Mario Parapetti	Emimmo Salvi (producer)	Profilms	13 Mar 1966
it:Un gangster venuto da Brooklyn (1966)		Emimmo Salvi		Emimmo Salvi	Mario Parapetti		Cineradi / Compagnia Cinematografica Astro (Madrid)	
it:Wanted Johnny Texas (1967)		Emimmo Salvi	Emimmo Salvi	Emimmo Salvi			Film-Kontor-Italiana, Firenze	17 Apr 1967
it:Pugni dollari & spinaci (1978)		Emimmo Salvi		Emimmo Salvi			Soilsub Cine TV (Società Italiana Lavori Subacquei), Milano	27 Apr 1978
