= Renato Terra =

Italian actor (1922–2010)

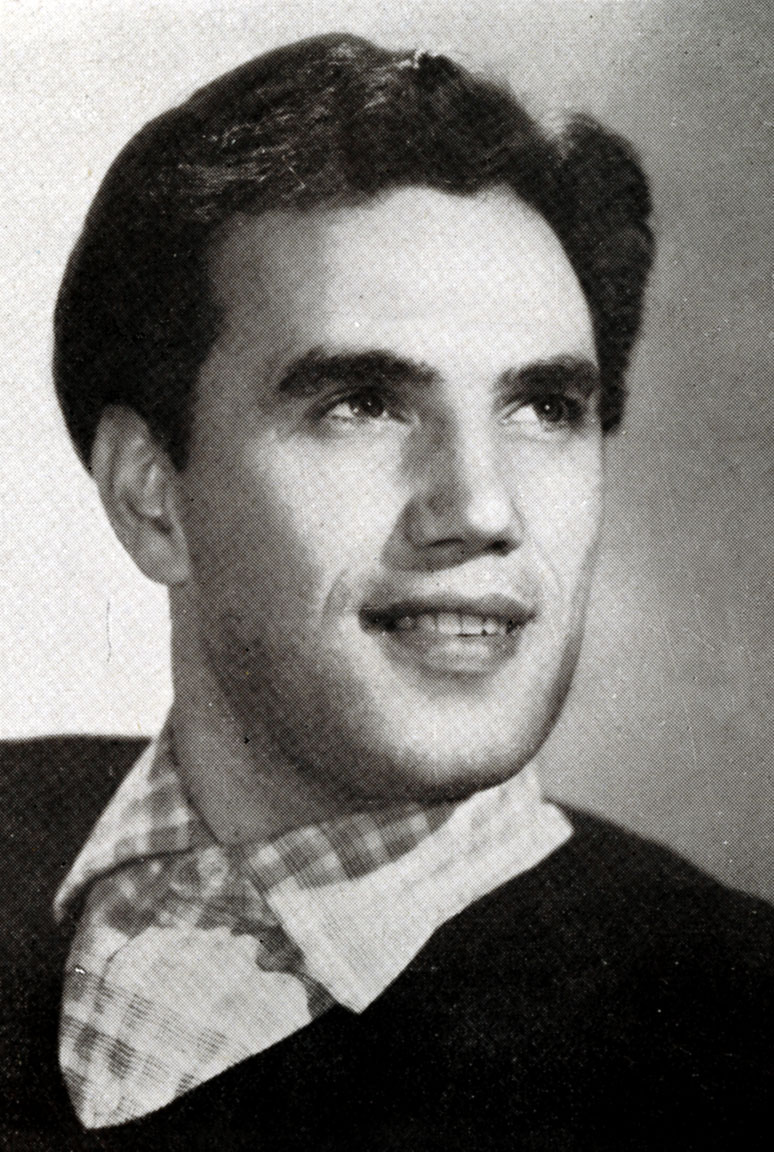
- Terra, c. 1954
- Born: 26 July 1922; Naples, Kingdom of Italy
- Died: 28 November 2010 (aged 88); Rome, Italy
- Occupations: Actor; poet
- Years active: 1938–1981

Renato Terra (26 July 1922 – 28 November 2010), also known by the alias Ryan Earthpick, was an Italian actor and later a poet.

== Biography ==
Terra had a career working in film as an actor, and appeared in over 80 movies. In 1977 he retired to become a poet.

He attended the Experimental Center of Cinematography in Rome and also used the alias Ryan Earthpick during his career. During the shooting of a film, he fell from a horse and permanently broke his nose. During his post-actor career as a poet, he published the book Che Strano Paese.

== Selected filmography ==
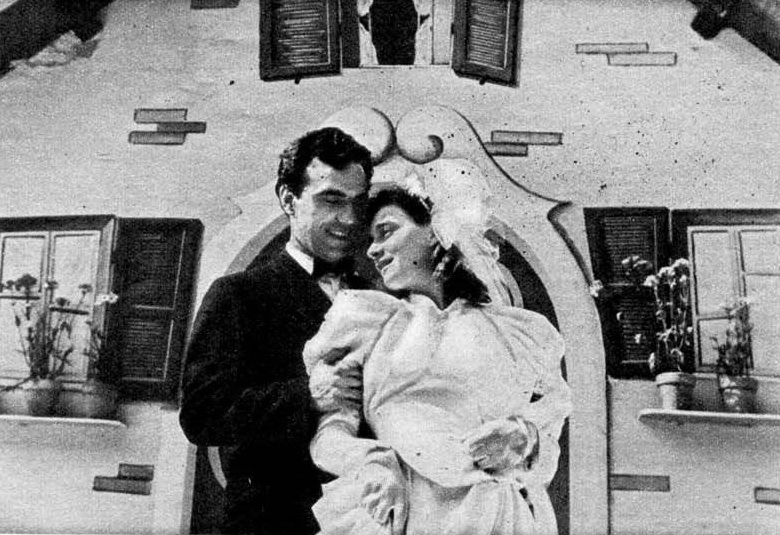
Renato Terra and Brunella Bovo in Vivo di te

- The Black Corsair (1938)
- Return to Naples (1949) – Nino
- Path of Hope (1950) – Mommino
- Hearts at Sea (1950)
- Vivo di te (1951, Short)
- The Bandit of Tacca Del Lupo (1952)
- I falsari (1953)
- A Husband for Anna (1953) – Il palpeggiatore
- Senso (1954) – Un soldato (uncredited)
- Proibito (1955)
- The Bachelor (1956) – Tiberio
- Nero's Weekend (1956)
- Kean: Genius or Scoundrel (1956)
- White Nights (1957) – Un coinvolto nella rissa
- The Man Who Wagged His Tail (1957)
- Ragazzi della marina (1957)
- Peppino, le modelle e chella là (1957)
- The Italians They Are Crazy (1958)
- Toto and Marcellino (1958)
- Piece of the Sky (1958) – La guardia giovane (uncredited)
- Giovane canaglia (1958) – complice di Daves
- Il romanzo di un giovane povero (1958)
- Big Deal on Madonna Street (1958) – Eladio
- The Law Is the Law (1958)
- La sfida (1958)
- Carmela è una bambola (1958) – Silvio
- Pia de' Tolomei (1958)
- Tuppe tuppe, Marescià! (1958)
- Destinazione Sanremo (1959)
- Le cameriere (1959)
- Goliath and the Barbarians (1959)
- The Facts of Murder (1959) – Man at the Notary's
- David and Goliath (1960)
- Carthage in Flames (1960)
- The Angel Wore Red (1960) (uncredited)
- Goliath and the Dragon (1960) – Antoneos
- Black Sunday (1960) – Boris
- Rocco and His Brothers (1960) – Alfredo, Ginetta's brother
- I'll See You in Hell (1960)
- Robin Hood and the Pirates (1960) – Barbanera
- Constantine and the Cross (1961) Jailer
- The Seven Revenges (1961)
- Gioventù di notte (1961) – Brigadiere
- The Tartars (1961)
- Goliath and the Vampires (1961)
- The Brigand (1961)
- Accattone (1961) – Farlocco #2
- Black City (1961) – Un agente
- Hercules in the Valley of Woe (1961)
- The Giant of Metropolis (1961) – Il Giovane Scienzato
- Accroche-toi, y'a du vent! (1961)
- The Italian Brigands (1961) – Il Brigante
- Madame (1961) – Un sans-culotte (uncredited)
- I due marescialli (1961)
- Disorder (1962)
- Alone Against Rome (1962) – Gladiator Trainer
- Night Train to Milan (1962) – Sottufficiale di polizia
- Toto and Peppino Divided in Berlin (1962) – 9
- Sodom and Gomorrah (1962) – (uncredited)
- Agostino (1962)
- Carmen di Trastevere (1962) – Gerardo, a Latin Lover
- The Sea (1962)
- The Four Monks (1962) – Un paesano
- Uno strano tipo (1963)
- The Fall of Rome (1963)
- The Monk of Monza (1963)
- Il Fornaretto di Venezia (1963)
- Hands over the City (1963) – Giornalista (uncredited)
- Hercules Against the Mongols (1963) – Karikan
- I 4 tassisti (1963)
- Liolà (1964)
- None But the Lonely Spy (1964) – Policeman
- Love in Four Dimensions (1964) – (segment "Amore e alfabeto")
- L'ultima carica (1964)
- Hercules Against the Barbarians (1964)
- La vita agra (1964)
- Grand Canyon Massacre (1964) – Curly Mason
- The Cavern (1964)
- Castle of the Living Dead (1964) – Policeman
- Two Escape from Sing Sing (1964)– Jim Doris
- The Gospel According to St. Matthew (1964) – Un indemoniato
- Intrigo a Los Angeles (1964) – Elston
- A Monster and a Half (1964)
- Ali Baba and the Seven Saracens (1964) – Saracen Leader
- Una storia di notte (1964)
- Gentlemen of the Night (1964)
- Three Dollars of Lead (1964)
- The Revenge of Ivanhoe (1965) – Tuck
- Letti sbagliati (1965)
- The Dirty Game (1965)
- La violenza e l'amore (1965)
- I complessi (1965) (segment "Il Complesso della Schiava nubiana")
- The Dreamer (1965)
- Man from Canyon City (1965)
- Thrilling (1965) (segment "L'autostrada del sole")
- Seven Golden Men (1965)
- Operation Atlantis (1965) – Fatima's Henchman (uncredited)
- I Knew Her Well (1965) – Man in the caravan
- Made in Italy (1965) – Immigrant (segment "6, Final episode")
- Weekend, Italian Style (1965) – Giovanni – the valet
- Lo scippo (1965)
- Seven Golden Men Strike Again (1966)
- Me, Me, Me... and the Others (1966)
- Seven Dollars on the Red (1966) – Manuel
- Savage Gringo (1966)
- Wake Up and Die (1966)
- The Mona Lisa Has Been Stolen (1966)
- Knives of the Avenger (1966) – Hagen's Henchman (uncredited)
- Tabú (1966) (uncredited)
- Kiss the Girls and Make Them Die (1966)
- Kill or Be Killed (1966) – Doctor
- Eroe vagabondo (1966)
- Ballata da un miliardo (1967)
- Requiescant (1967) – Alonso
- Gente d'onore (1967)
- Delitto a Posillipo – Londra chiama Napoli (1967)
- Requiescant (1967)
- El 'Che' Guevara (1969) – Sergeant
- Le lys de mer (1969)
- Ma chi t'ha dato la patente? (1970)
- Brother Sun, Sister Moon (1972)
- L'arbitro (1974)
- Paolo il freddo (1974)
- Jesus of Nazareth (1977, TV Mini-Series) – Abel
