= Luigi Ciavarro =

Italian actor

Luigi Ciavarro is an Italian film actor.

He played a member of Angel Eye's gang in The Good, the Bad and the Ugly (1966) alongside Benito Stefanelli, Aldo Sambrell and Romano Puppo, Flagstone deputy alongside Giorgio Trestini in C'era una volta il West (1968), both directed by Sergio Leone, and Turone in Battle of the Amazons (1973). He worked as the fight choreographer in Vulcan, Son of Giove (1962).

== Filmography ==
- The Trojan Horse (1961)
- Vulcan, Son of Giove (1962)
- The Seven Tasks of Ali Baba (1962) as Julius, Roman Guard (uncredited)
- Damned Pistols of Dallas (1964) as 'Fast Draw' Kershaw
- Three Dollars of Lead (1964) as Morrison Henchman #1
- Colorado Charlie (1965) as Tom Drasler
- M.M.M. 83 (1966)
- The Good, the Bad and the Ugly (1966) as Member of Angel Eyes' Gang (uncredited)
- Requiescant (1967) as Ferguson Henchman (uncredited)
- Seven Pistols for a Massacre (1967) as Little Tucson Deputy (uncredited)
- Return of Django (1967) as Eyepatch
- Eine Handvoll Helden (1967) as Steffen
- Two Pistols and a Coward (1968) as Posse member (uncredited)
- A Sky Full of Stars for a Roof (1968) as Pratt Henchman (uncredited)
- Once Upon a Time in the West (1968) as Older Sheriff's Deputy (uncredited)
- Cemetery Without Crosses (1969) as Corey (uncredited)
- Oro sangriento (1969) as Clayton Brother (uncredited)
- The Beast (1970) as Deputy Williams
- Return of Sabata (1971) as Night Guard (uncredited)
- They Call Him Cemetery (1971) as Brawler (uncredited)
- So Sweet, So Dead (1972)
- Battle of the Amazons (1973) as Turone
- Super Stooges vs the Wonder Women (1974) (final film role)
