= Furio Meniconi =

Italian actor

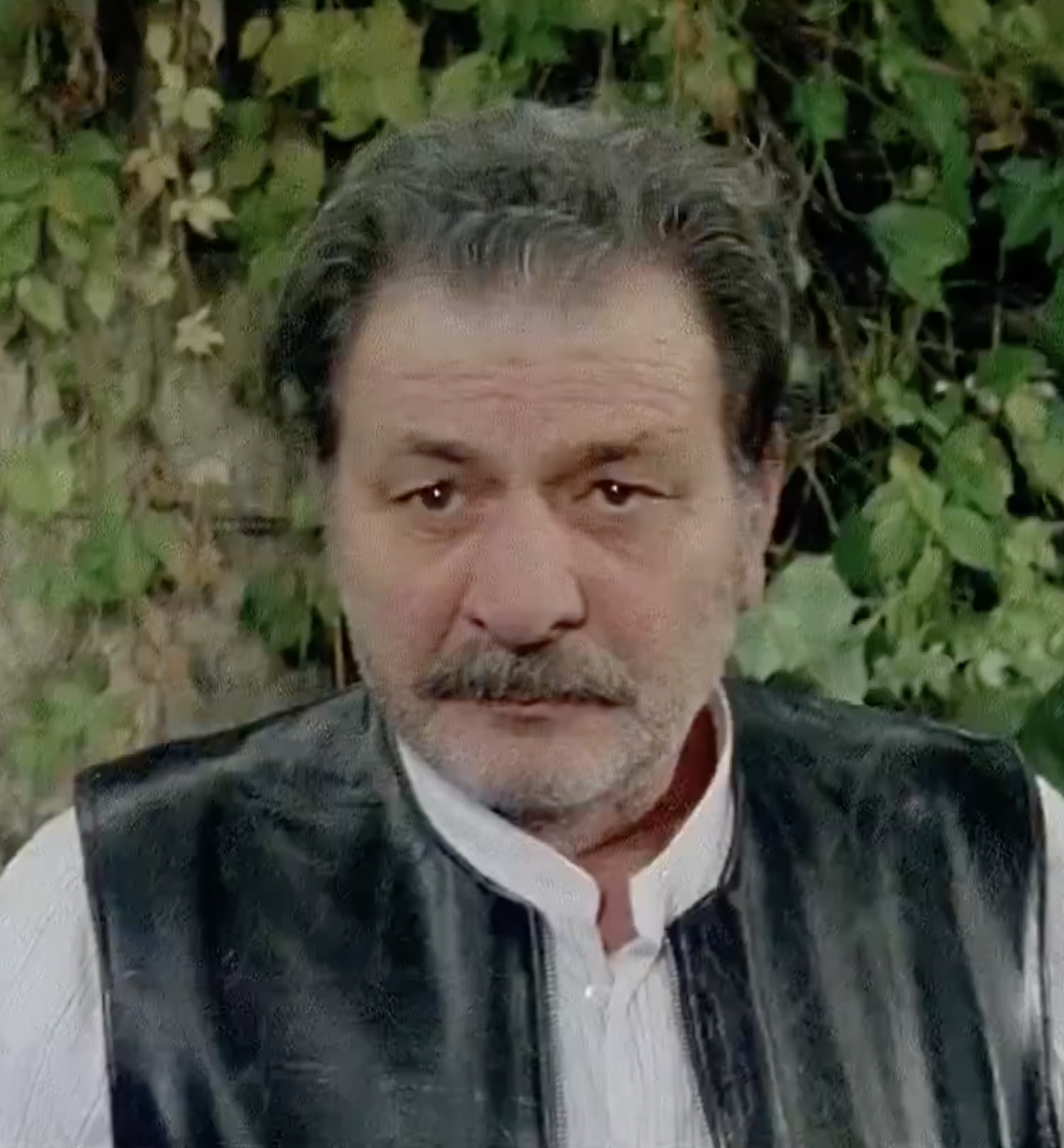
- Meniconi in Deep Red (1975)
- Born: 22 February 1924; Rome, Italy
- Died: 12 December 1981 (aged 57); Rome, Italy
- Occupation: Actor

Furio Meniconi (22 February 1924 – 12 December 1981) was an Italian film and television actor.

== Life and career ==
Meniconi was born in Rome into a family active in the cinema industry in the technical cast, or engaged in the general organization.

Together with his brother Mario Meniconi, he had worked as doubles on Carmine Gallone's Scipione l'Africano because of their height, as their brother Alfio recalled in a 2000 interview, claiming to have kept photographs from that production.

Since the early 1950s, Meniconi established himself as one of the most active character actors in the Italian genre cinema, especially in the Peplum, Spaghetti Western and pirate film genres. He was sometimes credited as Men Fury.

== Selected filmography ==
- Son of d'Artagnan (1950)
- Poppy (1952)
- Sardinian Vendetta (1952) - Primo fratello Leoni
- Patos e Papoulas (1953) - Spacciatore di droga
- Riscatto (1953)
- Attila (1954) - Capo della tribu
- Queen of Babylon (1954) - Bolgias
- La campana di San Giusto (1954)
- The Sign of Venus (1955) - Proprietario della trattoria
- Vous pigez? (1955) - Giuseppe
- Roland the Mighty (Orlando e i Paladini di Francia) (1956)
- Allow Me, Daddy! (1956) - Il secondo facchino
- Pirate of the Half Moon (1957) - Carceriere
- Adorabili e bugiarde (1958) - Gigetto
- Captain Falcon (1958)
- Goliath and the Barbarians (1959) - Hulderich
- Due selvaggi a corte (1959)
- Ben-Hur (1959) - Soldier (uncredited)
- David and Goliath (1960) - Asrod, King of the Philistines
- Carthage in Flames (1960)
- The Seven Revenges (1961) - Amok
- The Tartars (1961) - Sigrun
- The Giant of Metropolis (1961) - Egon - Father of Yota
- Vulcan Son of Jupiter (1962) - Jupiter - God of Lightning
- The Seven Tasks of Ali Baba (1962) - Mustapha
- Musketeers of the Sea (1962) - Pirate Captain
- The Avenger (1962) - Turno's Henchman (uncredited)
- Gold for the Caesars (1963) - Dax - the Gaul
- Cleopatra (1963) - Mithridates (uncredited)
- Terror of the Steppes (1964) - Kublai
- Hercules, Prisoner of Evil (1964) - Zereteli
- Desert Raiders (1964) - El Krim
- Hercules of the Desert (1964) - Manatha
- Bianco, rosso, giallo, rosa (1964) - Pillione
- Terror of the Steppes (1964)
- The Revenge of Ivanhoe (1965) - Etimbaldo
- The Agony and the Ecstasy (1965) - Peasant (uncredited)
- I predoni del Sahara (1965)
- James Tont operazione D.U.E. (1966)
- A Gangster Came from Brooklyn (1966)
- For a Few Extra Dollars (1966) - Newman
- Kill or Be Killed (1966) - Jonathan Griffith
- Snow Devils (1967) - Igrun
- Wanted (1967) - Jeremiah Prescott, Blacksmith
- Kill the Wicked! (1967) - Braddock
- John the Bastard (1967) - Papa Buck
- Gunman Sent by God (1968) - Norton
- I'll Sell My Skin Dearly (1968) - Joe, Shane's Father (uncredited)
- The Longest Hunt (1968) - Dickson
- Gatling Gun (1968) - Jeremiah Grant
- Kill Them All and Come Back Alone (1968) - Buddy
- The Two Crusaders (1968) - 'Saladino'
- Time and Place for Killing (1968) - Rock Mulligan
- Tarzana, the Wild Girl (1969) - Lars
- Isabella, duchessa dei diavoli (1969) - Hans the Hitmen's Leader
- Zum zum zum n° 2 (1969) - Warden (uncredited)
- Django the Bastard (1969) - Sheriff Reagan (uncredited)
- And God Said to Cain (1970) - Mike
- A Sword for Brando (1970) - Tall friar
- Sartana's Here… Trade Your Pistol for a Coffin (1970) - Romero (uncredited)
- Adiós, Sabata (1970) - Murdock (uncredited)
- Uccidi Django... uccidi per primo!!! (1971)
- Bastard, Go and Kill (1971) - Don Felipe Antonio de Martinez
- Long Live Robin Hood (1971) - Innkeeper
- Guns for Dollars (1971) - Glock (uncredited)
- Tara Pokì (1971) - Senor Pokì
- Armiamoci e partite! (1971) - French Soldier
- They Call Him Cemetery (1971) - Saloon Patron (uncredited)
- W Django! (1971) - Lo sceriffo
- His Name Was Holy Ghost (1972)
- Man Called Amen (1972) - Sheriff (uncredited)
- Deadly Trackers (1972) - Tom - Carter's Foreman
- Man of the East (1972) - Rancher on Train
- Alleluja & Sartana are Sons... Sons of God (1972) - Old man from Mountsville
- The Grand Duel (1972) - Hangman
- Those Dirty Dogs (1973) - Cantina Owner
- Even Angels Eat Beans (1973) - Wrestling Coach (uncredited)
- Man Called Invincible (1973) - Speedy Fingers
- Oremus, Alleluia e Così Sia (1973)
- Italian Graffiti (1973)
- Il bacio di una morta (1974) - Old Accomplice of Manuel
- Di Tresette ce n'è uno, tutti gli altri son nessuno (1974) - Doctor (uncredited)
- Ten Killers Came from Afar (1974) - (uncredited)
- Salvo D'Acquisto (1974) - Alvaro
- Deep Red (1975) - Rodi
- Go Gorilla Go (1975) - Old Man with Moustache (uncredited)
- A Genius, Two Partners and a Dupe (1975) - (uncredited)
- Hanno ucciso un altro bandito (1976) - (final film role)
