= The Trojan Horse (film) =

1961 film directed by Giorgio Ferroni

- Directed by: Giorgio Ferroni
- Screenplay by: Giorgio Ferroni; Ugo Liberatore; Giorgio Stegani; Federico Zardi
- Produced by: Giampaolo Bigazzi
- Starring: Steve Reeves; Juliette Mayniel; John Drew Barrymore; Edy Vessel
- Cinematography: Reno Filippini
- Edited by: Antonietta Zita
- Music by: Mario Amonini; Giovanni Fusco
- Production companies: Europa Cinematografica; Compangnie Inustrielle Commerciale Cinematographique; Les Films Modernes; Lovcen Film
- Distributed by: Variety Distribution
- Release date: 26 October 1961 (Italy)
- Running time: 115 minutes
- Countries: Italy; France; Yugoslavia
- Language: Italian

The Trojan Horse (Italian: La guerra di Troia) is a 1961 Italian peplum film set in the tenth and final year of the Trojan War. The film focuses primarily on the exploits of the Trojan hero Aeneas during this time. The film was directed by Giorgio Ferroni and stars Steve Reeves as Aeneas and John Drew Barrymore as Odysseus.

In 2004 it was restored and shown as part of the retrospective "Storia Segreta del Cinema Italiano: Italian Kings of the Bs" at the 61st Venice International Film Festival.

== Cast ==
- Steve Reeves as Aeneas
- Juliette Mayniel as Creusa
- John Drew Barrymore as Odysseus
- Edy Vessel as Helen
- Lidia Alfonsi as Cassandra
- Warner Bentivegna as Paris
- Luciana Angiolillo as Andromache
- Arturo Dominici as Achilles
- Mimmo Palmara as Ajax
- Nerio Bernardi as Agamemnon
- Nando Tamberlani as Menelaus
- Carlo Tamberlani as Priam
- Giancarlo Bastianoni as Acate
- Giovanni Cianfriglia as Diomedes
- Luigi Ciavarro
- Giulio Maculani as Sinone
- Nello Pazzafini as Achaean warrior
- Bianca Doria as Ecuba (uncredited)
- Andrej Gardenin as Fencer (uncredited)
- Nando Gazzolo as Narrator (uncredited)
- Nino Marchetti as Member of the council of elders (uncredited)
- Benito Stefanelli as Ulysses Right-hand Man (uncredited)

== Production ==
The battle scenes were shot in Yugoslavia.

== Release ==
The Trojan Horse was released in Italy on 26 October 1961 with a 115-minute running time. It was released in July 1962 in the United States with a 105-minute running time.

== See also ==
- List of historical drama films
- Greek mythology in popular culture
- Sword-and-sandal

== Footnotes ==
=== References ===
- Hughes, Howard (2011). Cinema Italiano - The Complete Guide From Classics To Cult. London - New York: I.B.Tauris. ISBN 978-1-84885-608-0.
- Kinnard, Roy; Crnkovich, Tony (2017). Italian Sword and Sandal Films, 1908-1990. McFarland. ISBN 978-1476662916.
