= The Changing of the Guard (film) =

1962 film

- Directed by: Giorgio Bianchi
- Written by: Charles Exbrayat (novel); Jean Manse; Albert Valentin
- Produced by: Aldo Pomilia
- Starring: Fernandel; Gino Cervi; Milla Sannoner
- Cinematography: Giuseppe Aquari
- Edited by: Maurizio Lucidi; Nella Nannuzzi
- Music by: Mario Nascimbene
- Production companies: Apo Film; Cocinor; Paris Elysées Films
- Distributed by: Compass Film; La Cinq
- Release date: 31 October 1962
- Running time: 90 minutes
- Countries: France; Italy
- Language: Italian

The Changing of the Guard (Italian: Il cambio della guardia) is a 1962 French-Italian comedy film directed by Giorgio Bianchi and starring Fernandel, Gino Cervi and Milla Sannoner.

== Cast ==
- Fernandel as Attilio Cappellaro
- Gino Cervi as Mario Vinicio
- Franco Parenti as Virgili
- Andrea Aureli as Luciano Mezzanotte
- Franck Fernandel as Gianni Cappellaro
- Milla Sannoner as Aurora Vinicio
- Dada Gallotti as Silvana Crippa
- Gérard Herter as Ufficiale tedesco
- Amelia Perrella as Bianca Vinicio
- Giuseppe Giannetto as Don Fausto
- Giuseppe Fortis as Luciano Crippa
- Piero Vivaldi as Vernazza
- Jimmy il Fenomeno as Pepè

== Bibliography ==
- Goble, Alan. The Complete Index to Literary Sources in Film. Walter de Gruyter, 1999.
