= Bella Cortez =

Cuban actress and dancer

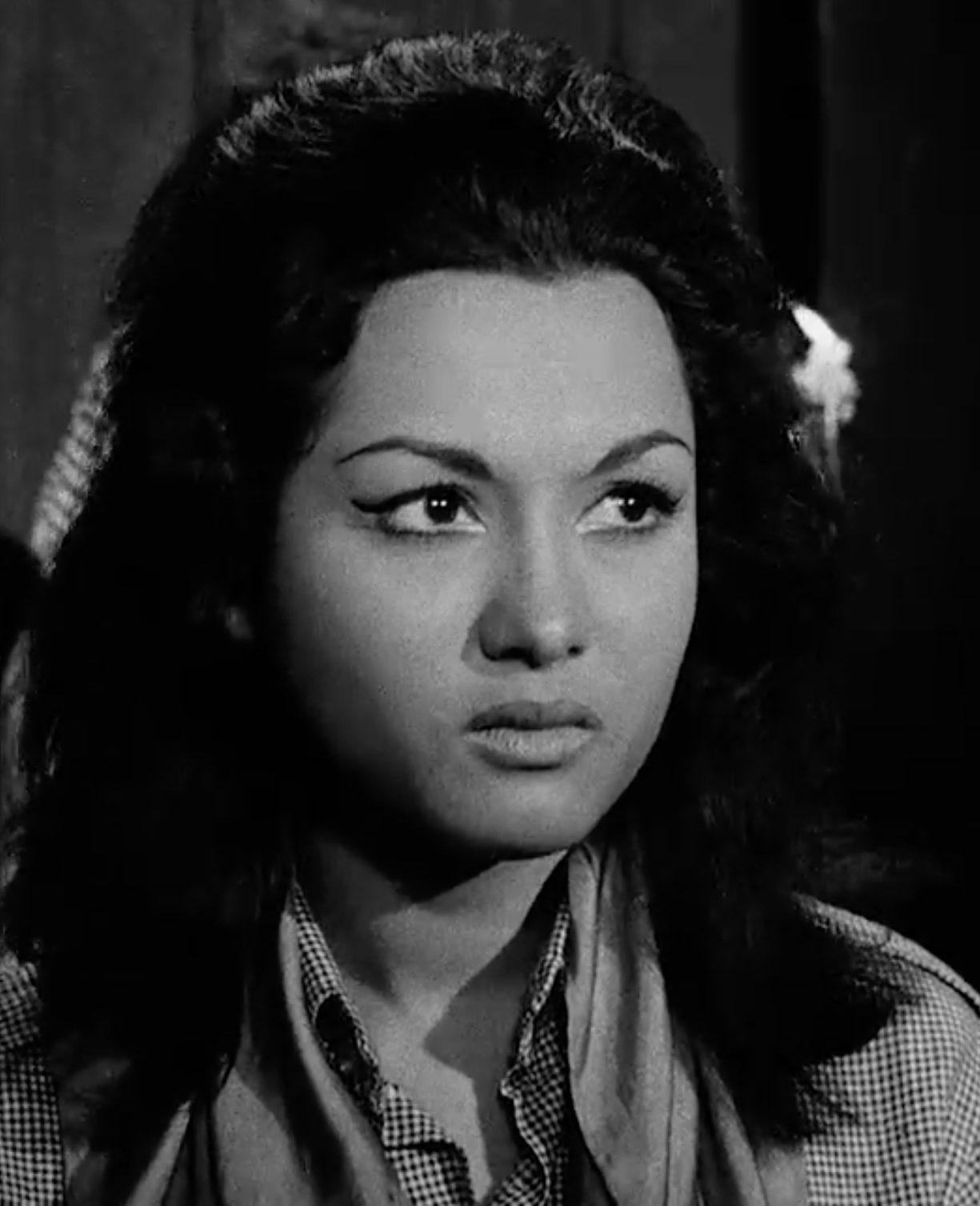
- Cortez in Katarsis (1963)
- Born: Alicia Paneque; 1944 (age 81–82); Cuba
- Other names: Bella Cortese
- Occupation: Actress

Bella Cortez (born Alicia Paneque, also known as Bella Cortese) is a Cuban actress and dancer known for her work in Italian sword-and-sandal films of the 1960s.

== Career ==
Alicia Paneque was spotted by an Italian film producer visiting Cuba. She accepted the proposal and moved to Italy. Her first release was Primo Zeglio's The Seven Revenges (1961).

Cortez played niece to Orson Welles's character and formed "an attractive pair of young lovers" with Luciano Marin in the international film The Tartars (1961). The same year, she was paired opposite Gordon Mitchell in the Seven Arts production The Giant of Metropolis (1961), directed by Umberto Scarpelli. They appeared together in two more films; Vulcan Son of Jupiter (1962) and Ali Baba and the Seven Saracens (1964). Cortez's characters were that of and Greco-Roman mythological Aetna an Arabian princess, respectively in these films. She continued her starring roles with Antonio Leonviola-directed epic drama Taur, The Mighty (1963).

Cortez played the female lead in Ali Baba and the Sacred Crown, directed by Erminio Salvi. The book Italian Sword and Sandal Films, 1908-1990 noted that Cortez was a "major asset to the production". She made appearance in a supporting character in Gothic horror Katarsis (1963).

Beside starring in 11 films, Cortez also did print modelling for cars and graced the covers of several European magazines. Following her marriage, she left the film industry.

== Personal life ==
Cortez was romantically involved with Emimmo Salvi. After her marriage, she relocated to the United States and as of 2011 Cortez was living at her daughter's house.

== Bibliography ==
- Kinnard, Roy; Crnkovich, Tony (2017). Italian Sword and Sandal Films, 1908-1990. McFarland. ISBN 978-1-4766-6291-6.
- Smith, Gary Allen (2009). Epic Films: Casts, Credits and Commentary on More Than 350 Historical Spectacle Movies (2nd ed.). McFarland. ISBN 978-1-4766-0418-3.
