= Three Graves for a Winchester =

1966 film by Emimmo Salvi

- Film poster
- Directed by: Emimmo Salvi
- Written by: Ambrogio Molteni; Emimmo Salvi; James Wilde (story)
- Produced by: Franco Mannocchi
- Starring: Mickey Hargitay; Gordon Mitchell
- Cinematography: Mario Parapetti
- Music by: Armando Sciascia
- Release date: 1966
- Running time: 99 minutes
- Country: Italy

Three Graves for a Winchester (Italian: 3 colpi di Winchester per Ringo), also known as Three Bullets for Ringo, is a 1966 Spaghetti Western film directed by Emimmo Salvi and shot in Totalscope. It is the first and only film collaboration between Mickey Hargitay and Gordon Mitchell. The two friends appeared together in Mae West's 1950s Las Vegas stage show, then traveled to Italy where they made sword and sandal films. It was the first Western for Gordon Mitchell.

== Plot ==
Ringo, Frank and their sidekick Tom are hired by Walton, a gunrunner to rescue Jane Walcom, his daughter from a band of Mexicans he did business with. Shooting their way through the mob, the rescue is a success, but Ringo and Frank's friendship is ruined when Jane marries Ringo.

The two do not meet again until after the end of the American Civil War. Ringo has become the town sheriff and the father of a son. Frank returns to his hometown as a leader of a band of Confederate Guerrillas and outlaws. Frank obtains both wealth and revenge by hiring himself out to town boss Daniels who pays Frank to terrorize the town in order to obtain ranches from reluctant owners as well as murdering Ringo's mother and kidnapping Jane.

== Cast ==
- Mickey Hargitay as Ringo Carson
- Gordon Mitchell as Frank Sanders
- Milla Sannoner as Jane Carson née Walcom
- Spartaco Conversi as Tom (credited as Spean Convery)
- Ivano Staccioli as Daniels (credited as John Heston)
- Amedeo Trilli as Walcom (credited as Mike Moore)
- Margherita Horowitz as Mother Carson

== Production ==
Filming was in areas near Almeria, Spain and in Rome.

== Box office ==
Hit Parade Italia places the film 98th in its retrospective ranking of the Italian box office for the 1965–66 season.

== Reception ==
=== Contemporary ===
In 1966, Segnalazioni cinematografiche criticised the film's modest sets and found its plot crudely constructed and implausible.

=== Retrospective ===
Italian critic Davide Pulici praised the film, noting the formal similarities with Mario Bava's horror films, highlighting that 'certain visionary glimpses verge on the astonishing', and commending its original narrative twists.
