= I Am Semiramis =

- Film poster
- Directed by: Primo Zeglio
- Written by: Primo Zeglio; Luigi De Santis
- Screenplay by: Fede Arnaud; Alberto Liberati
- Starring: Yvonne Furneaux; John Ericson
- Cinematography: Alvaro Mancori
- Edited by: Alberto Gallitti
- Music by: Carlo Savina
- Production company: Apo Films
- Distributed by: Globe International Film
- Release date: 1963
- Running time: 100 min
- Country: Italy
- Languages: Italian; English

Io Semiramide (AKA: I Am Semiramis, AKA: Slave Queen of Babylon, AKA: Duelo de Reyes) is a 1963 Italian peplum film about Semiramis, a queen of the Neo-Assyrian Empire. It was directed by Primo Zeglio. The legends are in part based on the historical Shammuramat, queen consort of Shamshi-Adad V and regent for her son Adad-nirari III.

== Plot ==
During the reign of Semiramis, the beautiful queen of the Assyrian people, Assyria reaches one of the periods of greatest splendour, and to crown her successes she gives the order to build the great city of Babylon. A young woman of the court of great political ambition, Semiramis falls in love with Kir, a prince enslaved who reciprocates. Kir, king of the Dardanians, is defeated in combat by General Onnos during a military campaign launched by the latter against Nineveh in Assyria.

Reduced to slavery, Kir is taken with other slaves to the capital where the general presents his prizes to King Minurte. Semiramis persuades Minurte to offer him Kir and also obtains a domain. She employs her slaves, including Kir, to build a city that becomes Babylon. Meanwhile, she leads political machinations and alliances with Kir and Onnos in order to overthrow Minurte and take her place on the throne.

The conspirators manage to take Kir from the queen and convince him that he has been betrayed by Semiramis with another man. Furious, Kir takes charge of the conspiracy against his beloved. Discovering the truth, Semiramis poisons Kir by making him drink from a poisoned cup. Later, during the funeral, the queen is shot by an arrow thrown by the conspirators. The bodies of the two lovers are then burned together, united in death.

== Cast ==
- Yvonne Furneaux as "Semiramis"
- John Ericson as "Kir"
- Renzo Ricci as "Minurte"
- Germano Longo as "Onnos"
- Gianni Rizzo as "Ghelas"
- John Bartha as "Althar"
- Nino di Napoli as "Adath"

== See also ==
- List of historical drama films and series set in Near Eastern and Western civilization
- War Gods of Babylon (1962)
- Queen of Babylon (1954)
- The Beast of Babylon Against the Son of Hercules (1963)
