= Captain Falcon (film) =

1958 film directed by Carlo Campogalliani

- Directed by: Carlo Campogalliani
- Written by: Carlo Campogalliani; Isabella Conino; Gino Mangini; Vittorio Nino Novarese; Emimmo Salvi
- Produced by: Giuliano Simonetti
- Starring: Lex Barker; Rossana Rory; Massimo Serato
- Cinematography: Bitto Albertini
- Edited by: Carlo Campogalliani
- Music by: Carlo Innocenzi
- Release date: 22 December 1958
- Running time: 85 minutes
- Countries: France; Italy
- Language: Italian

Captain Falcon (Italian: Capitan Fuoco, lit. 'Captain Fire') is a 1958 French-Italian adventure film directed by Carlo Campogalliani and starring Lex Barker, Rossana Rory, and Massimo Serato. It has also been called a costume drama. The film is set in thirteenth century Italy where a tyrannical baron is confronted by a Robin Hood-style outlaw.

== Synopsis ==
An action-packed story of two rival Italian Dukedoms and how they are brought together on peaceful terms by a rebel soldier who at the same time finds fame and romance.

== Cast ==
- Lex Barker as Pietro, detto Capitan Fuoco
- Rossana Rory as Elena di Roccalta
- Massimo Serato as Baron Oddo di Serra
- Anna Maria Ferrero as Anna
- Paul Muller as Rusca
- Carla Calò as Teresa
- Herbert A.E. Böhme as Count Gualtiero di Roccalta
- Dante Maggio as Civetta
- Piero Lulli as Lupo
- Livio Lorenzon as Captain Manfredo
- Luigi Cimara as Eremit
- Furio Meniconi
- Mario Meniconi
- Umberto Fiz
- Andrea Scotti
- Luigi Tosi
- Gino Scotti
- Luigi Guasco
- Lilly Furia
- Tonino Stoppa

== Production ==
The film was shot in Rome.

== Release ==
The film was released in Italy, in the United Kingdom and West Germany. It was also released by Loew's, Inc.

== Reception ==
The film received mixed to negative reviews. It was criticized for the depiction of intense action scenery and battles.

== Bibliography ==
- Harty, Kevin J. (1999). The Reel Middle Ages: American, Western and Eastern European, Middle Eastern and Asian Films About Medieval Europe. Jefferson, NC: McFarland. ISBN 978-0-7864-2657-7.
