= The Giant of Metropolis =

- US theatrical release poster
- Directed by: Umberto Scarpelli
- Written by: Sabatino Ciuffini (screenplay); Ambrogio Molteni (screenplay); Oreste Palella (screenplay); Emimmo Salvi (dialogue); Emimmo Salvi (screenplay); Umberto Scarpelli (dialogue); Gino Stafford (screenplay); Gino Stafford (story)
- Produced by: Decio Salvi (executive producer); Emimmo Salvi (producer)
- Cinematography: Oberdan Troiani
- Edited by: Franco Fraticelli
- Music by: Armando Trovajoli
- Release date: 1961
- Running time: 98 minutes 85 minutes (France)
- Country: Italy
- Language: Italian

The Giant of Metropolis (Italian: Il gigante di Metropolis) is a 1961 color Italian fantasy adventure film that was produced by Decio Salvi and Emimmo Salvi, directed by Umberto Scarpelli, that stars Gordon Mitchell and Bella Cortez.

== Plot ==
Muscleman Obro travels to the sinful capital of Atlantis to rebuke its godlessness and hubris and becomes involved in the battle against its evil lord Yotar and his hideous super-science schemes, which involve transplanting an old and knowledgeable brain into his son's body.

== Cast ==
- Gordon Mitchell as Obro
- Bella Cortez as La principessa Mecede
- Roldano Lupi as Il re Yotar
- Carlo Angeletti ("Marietto") as Elmos
- Omero Gargano as Il vecchio saggio
- Mario Meniconi as Il padre di Obro
- Carlo Tamberlani as Il padre di Yotar
- Luigi Moneta as Il primo ministro
- Ugo Sasso as Il capitano delle guardie nere
- Renato Terra as Il giovane scienzato
- Carlo Enrici as Assistante dello scienziato
- Leopoldo Savona as Danzatore
- Furio Meniconi as Egon
- Liana Orfei as Queen Texen

== Box office ==
Hit Parade Italia places the film 73rd in its retrospective ranking of the Italian box office for the 1960–61 season.
