= Secret Agent Super Dragon =

- Directed by: Giorgio Ferroni
- Story by: Giorgio Ferroni
- Starring: Ray Danton; Marisa Mell; Margaret Lee
- Cinematography: Tony Secchi
- Edited by: Antonietta Zita
- Music by: Benedetto Ghiglia
- Production companies: Ramo Film; Films Borderie S.A. (C.I.C.C.); Constantin Film GmbH; Fono Roma S.p.A.
- Distributed by: Variety Distribution
- Release date: 24 May 1966 (France)
- Running time: 95 minutes
- Countries: Italy; France; West Germany
- Languages: Italian; English

Secret Agent Super Dragon (Italian: New York chiama Superdrago) is a 1966 internationally co-produced Eurospy film directed by Giorgio Ferroni, and starring Ray Danton as the titular secret agent.

== Plot ==
The plot centers on a secret agent and an evil organization that is drugging people for world domination. After his colleague is killed, the eponymous Secret Agent Super Dragon comes out of retirement to investigate. The main character discovers that the culprits in this crime are actually part of an international crime syndicate, and that they are smuggling the drugs in imported vases.

== Cast ==
- Ray Danton as Bryan Cooper (Super Dragon)
- Marisa Mell as Charity Farrel
- Margaret Lee as Cynthia Fulton
- Jess Hahn as Baby Face
- Carlo D'Angelo as Fernand Lamas
- Adriana Ambesi as Verna
- Marco Guglielmi as Professor Kurge
- Solvi Stubing as Elizabeth
- Gérard Herter as Coleman
- Jacques Herlin as Ross
- Benito Stefanelli as Kirk

== Release ==
Secret Agent Super Dragon was released in France on May 24, 1966.

In August 1993, the film appeared as a featured offering on episode 504 of the satirical television series Mystery Science Theater 3000.
