= W Django! =

1971 film

- Directed by: Edoardo Mulargia
- Written by: Nino Stresa
- Starring: Anthony Steffen
- Cinematography: Marcello Masciocchi
- Music by: Piero Umiliani
- Release date: 1971
- Country: Italy
- Language: Italian

W Django! (also known as A Man Called Django! and Viva Django) is a 1971 Italian Spaghetti Western film directed by Edoardo Mulargia and starring Anthony Steffen.

== Plot ==
With the help of the horse thief Carranza, Django tracks down and kills one by one the men who murdered his wife.

== Cast ==
- Anthony Steffen as Django
- Stelio Candelli as Jeff
- Glauco Onorato as Carranza
- Cris Avram as Gomez
- Esmeralda Barros as Lola
- Donato Castellaneta as Paco
- Simonetta Vitelli as Ines
- Benito Stefanelli as Ibanez
- Riccardo Pizzuti as Thompson
- Furio Meniconi as The Sheriff
