= Long Live Robin Hood =

- Directed by: Giorgio Ferroni
- Screenplay by: Ennio De Concini; Mauel Torres Larreda; Giorgio Stegani; Andre Tranche
- Story by: Ennio De Concini
- Produced by: Ernest Boetan
- Starring: Giuliano Gemma; Mark Damon; Silvia Dionisio; Mario Adorf
- Cinematography: Giuseppe Pinori
- Edited by: Antonietta Zita
- Music by: Gianni Ferrio
- Production companies: Ocena Produzioni Internazionali Cinematografiche; Les Films Corona; Talia Films
- Release date: 12 March 1971 (Italy)
- Running time: 103 minutes
- Countries: Italy; France; Spain

Long Live Robin Hood (Italian: L'arciere di fuoco) is a 1971 swashbuckler film directed by Giorgio Ferroni. It is based on the Robin Hood legend. It also has been known under its translated Italian name Archer of Fire.

== Cast ==
- Giuliano Gemma as Robin Hood
- Mark Damon as Allan
- Luis Dávila as Sir Robert
- Silvia Dionisio as Lady Marianne
- Mario Adorf as Brother Tuck
- Manuel Zarzo as Will Scarlet
- Nello Pazzafini as Little John
- Pierre Cressoy as Sir Guy
- Daniele Dublino as Prince John
- Helga Liné as Matilde
- Neno Zamperla as one of Robin's men
- Lars Bloch as King Richard Lionheart (as Lars Block)
- Pupo De Luca as Wrong Priest (as Gianni De Luca)
- Giulio Donnini as Priest at Wedding Ceremony
- Furio Meniconi as Innkeeper

== Production ==
Long Live Robin Hood was partially shot at Colegiata y Castillo de Cardona in Barcelona, Spain.

== Release ==
Long Live Robin Hood was released in Italy on March 12, 1971. It was released in the United States in 1976.

== See also ==
- List of films and television series featuring Robin Hood

== Footnotes ==
=== References ===
- Kinnard, Roy; Crnkovich, Tony (2017). Italian Sword and Sandal Films, 1908-1990. McFarland. ISBN 978-1476662916.
