= Giorgio Ferroni =

Italian film director (1908–1981)

- Born: 12 April 1908; Perugia, Italy
- Died: 17 August 1981 (aged 73)
- Other names: Calvin Jackson Padget
- Occupations: Film director, film editor, screenwriter

Giorgio Ferroni (12 April 1908 – 17 August 1981) was an Italian film director.

== Life and career ==
Giorgio Ferroni was born in Perugia on 12 April 1908. Ferroni began his career in film with short documentaries during World War II. He directed his first dramatic film The Thrill of the Skies in 1939.

At the time of filming The Night of the Devils, Ferroni was almost completely deaf and had to direct the film with the help of a hearing aid. Following the release of the film, a new project titled E i mostri uscirono dalle loro tane (transl. And the Monsters Came Out of Their Lair). Ferroni only helmed one more film with the comedy Antonio e Placido: attenti ragazzi...chi rompe paga which he is credited as Calvin Jackson Padget, a name he used for directing Westerns in the 1960s. Ferroni died in 1981.

== Selected filmography ==
Note: The films listed as "-" are not necessarily chronological.

Title	Year	Credited as					Notes	Ref(s)
Title	Year	Director	Screenwriter	Screen story writer	Editor	Other	Notes	Ref(s)
The Three Wishes	—N/a	Yes						
Terra di fuoco	—N/a	Yes						
Il fanciullo del West	—N/a	Yes						
Macario Against Zagomar	—N/a	Yes	Yes			Yes	Acting role	
Ritorno al nido	—N/a	Yes	Yes		Yes			
Senza famiglia	—N/a	Yes	Yes		Yes			
Posto di blocco	—N/a					Yes	Acting role	
Pian delle stelle	—N/a	Yes	Yes					
Tombolo, paradiso nero	1947	Yes	Yes					
Marechiaro	—N/a	Yes						
Vivere a sbafo	—N/a	Yes		Yes				
I quattro del Getto Tonante	—N/a			Yes				
Vertigine bianca (English: White Vertigo)	1956	Yes	Yes	Yes				
L'oceano ci chiama	—N/a	Yes	Yes	Yes	Yes			
1940, fuoco nel deserto	—N/a	Yes						
Mill of the Stone Women	1960	Yes	Yes					
The Bacchantes	1961	Yes	Yes		Yes			
The Trojan Horse	1961	Yes	Yes					
Hercules vs. Moloch	1963	Yes	Yes					
Thunder of Battle	1964	Yes						
Hero of Rome	1964	Yes						
The Lion of Thebes	1964	Yes						
Blood for a Silver Dollar	1965	Yes		Yes				
Fort Yuma Gold	1966	Yes						
Secret Agent Super Dragon	1966	Yes		Yes				.
Wanted	1967	Yes						
Il pistolero segnato da Dio	1967	Yes		Yes	Yes			
The Battle of El Alamein	1969	Yes						
Long Live Robin Hood	1971	Yes						
The Night of the Devils	1972	Yes						
