= Franck Fernandel =

French actor and singer (1935–2011)

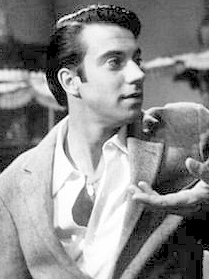
- Franck Fernandel in 1962
- Born: Franck Gérard Ignace Contandin; December 11, 1935; Marseille (Bouches-du-Rhône)
- Died: June 8, 2011 (aged 75); Marseille (Bouches-du-Rhône)
- Occupations: Actor, singer, radio host

Franck Fernandel (born Franck Gérard Ignace Contandin; 10 December 1935 – 8 June 2011) was a French actor, singer and songwriter, and writer.

== Biography ==
Franck was the only son of three children born to the famous French actor Fernandel. He acted alongside his father in three films, The Changing of the Guard in 1962, Gilles Grangier's L'Âge ingrat and Georges Bianchi's En avant la musique.

He was not only an actor; he also had a passion for music and achieved great success as a singer. His hits included the songs "Fanny", "Les Yeux d'un ange", "Un Américain dans les rues de Rio", "Bonjour Marie" and "L'Amour interdit". As a singer he toured Europe, Canada and the United States.

Later in his career he became a radio host.

He died on the night of 7/8 June 2011.
