= David and Goliath (1960 film) =

- Directed by: Ferdinando Baldi; Richard Pottier; Orson Welles
- Written by: Gino Mangini; Ambrogio Molteni; Emimmo Salvi; Umberto Scarpelli
- Produced by: Emimmo Salvi
- Starring: Orson Welles; Eleonora Rossi Drago; Ivica Pajer; Giulia Rubini; Pierre Cressoy; Hilton Edwards; Aldo Pedinotti; Massimo Serato
- Cinematography: Carlo Fiore; Bitto Albertini
- Edited by: Franco Fraticelli
- Music by: Carlo Innocenzi
- Distributed by: Allied Artists
- Release date: 22 January 1960
- Running time: 113 minutes
- Country: Italy
- Languages: English; Italian

David and Goliath (Italian: David e Golia) is a 1960 Italian film directed by Ferdinando Baldi and Richard Pottier with sequences filmed in Israel and Yugoslavia.

== Plot ==
The Prophet Samuel foretells a new king will rule Israel to the dismay of King Saul and his cousin and commander in chief Abner. King Saul has been having a streak of bad luck since the Philistine captivity of the Ark and fears the newcomer but doesn't know who the new king will be.

The unsuspecting shepherd David visits Jerusalem where he is identified as the king. Abner decides to test his wisdom by asking how the Israelites can get around the Philistines' imposed edict that the only ones who may lawfully bear arms in defeated Israel are the officers of Saul's court and his palace guard. David replies that the Philistines have set no limit on the number of officers or palace guards.

Meanwhile, King Asrod of the Philistines plots another attack on the riches of Israel, this time accompanied by the fearsome giant Goliath.

== Cast ==
- Orson Welles as King Saul
- Eleonora Rossi Drago as Merab
- Ivica Pajer as David. Credited as Ivo Payer.
- Giulia Rubini as Michal
- Pierre Cressoy as Jonathan
- Hilton Edwards as Prophet Samuel
- Aldo Pedinotti as Goliath. Credited as "Kronos".
- Massimo Serato as Abner
- Furio Meniconi as Asrod, King of the Philistines
- Dante Maggio as Cret
- Luigi Tosi as Benjamin of Gaba
- Umberto Fiz as Lazar
- Ugo Sasso as Huro

== Production ==
A part of the production took place in Jerusalem, another in Yugoslavia.

== Comic book adaptation ==
- Dell Four Color #1205 (July 1961)
