= The Invincible Brothers Maciste =

- Directed by: Roberto Mauri
- Screenplay by: Roberto Mauri; Edoardo Mulargia
- Produced by: Domenico Seymandi
- Starring: Richard Lloyd; Mario Novelli; Claudie Lange; Anthony Steffan
- Cinematography: Romolo Garroni
- Edited by: Enzo Alabiso
- Production company: IFESA
- Distributed by: Variety Distribution
- Release date: 18 December 1964 (Italy)
- Running time: 90 minutes
- Country: Italy

The Invincible Brothers Maciste (Italian: Gli invincibili fratelli Maciste) is a 1964 Italian peplum film written and directed by Roberto Mauri.

== Plot ==
Two Herculean warrior brothers battle to save their prince from the clutches of an evil queen, in a hidden world lurking behind a giant waterfall. The depraved queen practices mind-control and must force her slave population to continually turn a waterwheel lest their world come to an end.

== Cast ==
- Richard Lloyd as Maciste The Old
- Claudie Lange as Queen Thaliade
- Tony Freeman as Maciste The Young
- Anthony Steffen as Prince Akim
- Ursula Davis as Jana
- Gia Sandri as Nice

== Release ==
The Invincible Brothers Maciste was released theatrically in Italy on 18 December 1964. On its release in the United States, the film had a different running time of 92 minutes.
