= Treasure of the Petrified Forest =

Il tesoro della foresta pietrificata
- Directed by: Emimmo Salvi
- Written by: Luigi Tosi, Emimmo Salvi, Adriano Antonelli, Benito Ilforte
- Produced by: Dante Chiappa
- Cinematography: Mario Parapetti
- Edited by: Enzo Alfonsi
- Music by: Rolf Ferraro, Richard Wagner
- Production companies: Asteria Film, Olga Chart
- Release date: 1965
- Running time: 86 minutes
- Country: Italy
- Language: Italian

Treasure of the Petrified Forest (Italian: Il tesoro della foresta pietrificata) is a 1965 Italian adventure film directed by Emimmo Salvi.

It mixes elements of the Nibelungen saga and of Richard Wagner's opera Ring of the Nibelung, which is also used as soundtrack (especially the famous Ride of the Valkyries).

== Plot ==
The god Wotan gives the young Prince Sigmund of Valhalla and his sister Brunhilde, the leader of the Valkyries, the task of defend the Petrified Forest. This is threatened by the Vikings, led by the aggressive Hunding, who plans an invasion of the forest, in search of the secret treasure of the Nibelung, the possession of which prospects unlimited power.

After crossing the border and invading Valhalla, Hunding finds an ally in the daughter of one of Sigmund's loyal followers, Erika, who is embittered by unrequited love. With her help the Vikings raid the camp of the Walhalla residents and kill many warriors. Sigmund swears vengeance and pursues them with the remaining men. However, thanks to other traitors in Sigmund's ranks, Hunding succeeds in capturing him and his fiancée Siglinde, Erika's sister. At the end, Sigmund escapes and, with the help of the Valkiries, succeeds in stopping the invaders and defeating Hunding in a duel.

== Cast ==
- Gordon Mitchell as Hunding
- Ivica Pajer (as Ivo Payer) as Sigmund
- Eleonora Bianchi as Siglinde
- Pamela Tudor as Brunhild
- Amedeo Trilli (credited as Mike Moore) as Gunar
- Luigi Tosi (credited as Nat Koster) as Otto
- Pietro Ceccarelli (credited as Puccio Ceccarelli) as Hans
- Franco Doria as the dwarf Kurt
- Attilio Severini as Fredrik
- Franco Beltramme as Manfred
- Lella Cattaneo as a witch
- Lia Giordano as a viking woman
- Giorgio Tesei as Olaf
- Giovanni Ivan Scratuglia (credited as Ivan Scratuglia) as a viking warrior
- Luisa Rivelli as Erika
- Francesco Sormano as Wotan

== See also ==
- Die Walküre by Richard Wagner
