= Gli uomini non guardano il cielo =

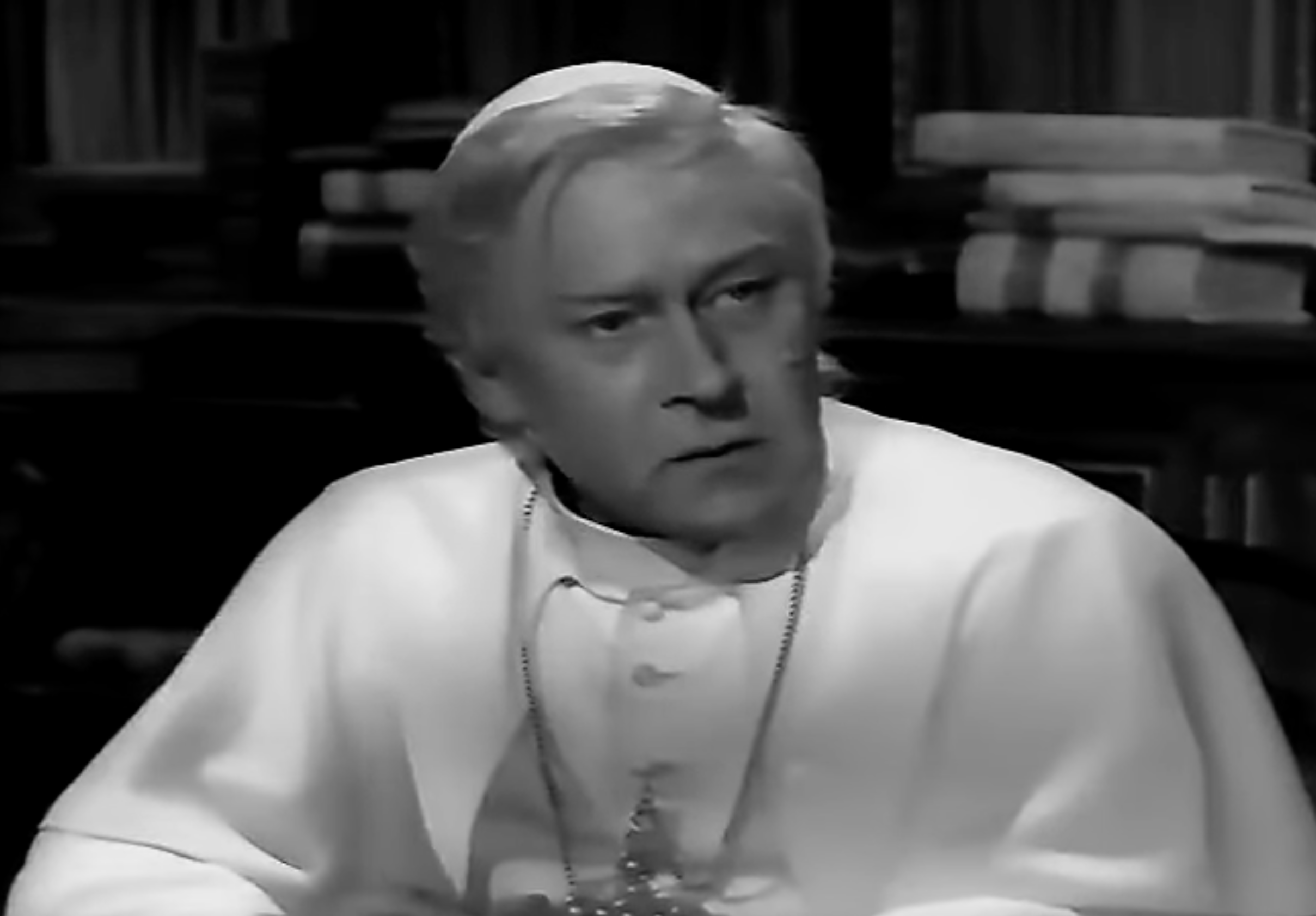
- Henri Vidon as Pius X
- Directed by: Umberto Scarpelli
- Release date: 1952
- Country: Italy
- Language: Italian

Gli uomini non guardano il cielo is a 1952 Italian drama film.

== Cast ==
- Henri Vidon: Pope Pius X
- Tullio Carminati: Cardinal Merry del Val
- Isa Miranda: The countess
