= Hercules, Samson and Ulysses =

- Italian poster for Hercules, Samson and Ulysses
- Directed by: Pietro Francisci
- Screenplay by: Pietro Francisci
- Produced by: Joseph Byrd
- Starring: Kirk Morris; Iloosh Khoshabe; Liana Orfei; Diletta D'Andrea
- Cinematography: Silvano Ippoliti
- Edited by: Pietro Francisci
- Music by: Angelo Francesco Lavagnino
- Production company: I.C.D.
- Distributed by: Metro-Goldwyn-Mayer
- Release dates: 20 December 1963 (Italy); 13 May 1965 (United States)
- Running time: 93 minutes
- Country: Italy

Hercules, Samson and Ulysses (Italian: Ercole sfida Sansone) is a 1963 Italian Metrocolor peplum film directed by Pietro Francisci.

The film's costume designers repurposed Nazi helmets for the Philistine headgear.

== Plot ==
In Ithaca, off the coast of Greece, Hercules is living with his wife Iole and his little son at the court of King Laertes. A delegation of fishermen comes to ask Laertes to do something about a sea monster that is killing some of them. Hercules volunteers to slay the monster, and Laertes provides him with a ship and crew. Ulysses, Laertes's young son, goes along with them, taking homing pigeons at his parents' insistence.

Hercules eventually spears the sea monster, but a violent storm then appears. The monster dies, and the ship is wrecked. Only six men, including Hercules and Ulysses, are left to float on a fragment of it. They come aground on the coast of Judea, and walk to the village of the Danites, (Note: Israelites of the tribe of Dan.) who are tyrannized by the Philistines. The travelers get horses from a Philistine dealer and ride to Gaza, where the Philistine King, or "Seren", may give them a ship.

En route, the Greeks' party is attacked by a lion, which Hercules strangles. This makes the Philistine horse-owner think that Hercules is the Danite fugitive Samson, and so reports to the Seren.

Philistine soldiers enter the Danite village to look for Samson. They find a second strangled lion, kill the children, burn the village and capture the able-bodied adults to sell as slaves. While saving a woman, Samson kills all the soldiers. Furious, Samson thinks that the Greek sailors are Philistine spies and were behind the attack.

In Gaza, the Seren has the Greeks barred in and challenges Hercules to prove that he is not Samson. If Hercules brings Samson to the Seren in the next three days, the Greeks will be let go and receive a ship to sail home. Delilah, the Seren's girlfriend, decides to help Hercules. She dresses like a poor woman, plotting to lure Samson out by pretending that Hercules is dragging her off as a Danite prisoner.

This plan succeeds; Samson appears and challenges Hercules. They settle in for a battle, hurling boulders at each other, knocking down pillars and archways, and fighting with iron poles. They eventually realize that they are both for Danite freedom and against the Seren. Delilah tries to flee and warn the Seren, but they bring her down. She then uses her wiles on Samson to get him to let her go in aid of a plan to have Hercules pretend to bring Samson in, then trust Samson to flee after the hostages are freed and the ship sailed.

Meanwhile, Iole and the others at home receive the pigeons, and learn that the Greek sailors are in Judea. Laertes provides Iole with his best ship and crew to go bring them home.

Hercules and Samson approach Gaza and wait to see Ulysses and the other Greeks put onto the ship before fake-tying Samson up for the pretend delivery. But Delilah told the Seren their plan, and appears beside him in armour as he directs soldiers to close in on the two, while Philistine soldiers are also concealed on the ship to kill the other Greeks. Ulysses notices this and alerts the others, who subdue them, then swims ashore to warn Hercules and Samson. They are on a hill below the temple of Dagon, and fight off the soldiers by hurling boulders down on them; they then collaborate to raise the iron beam on which the temple rests, bringing it down in an avalanche of stone on the army. They run for the ship, but the Seren's men fire flaming arrows and burn it (the other Greeks dive overboard). Iole's ship then appears, and the men on board shoot a multi-spear contraption that disposes of all the remaining Philistines. The Seren wounds Ulysses from the shore, and Samson hurls a spear which kills him.

On board the rescue ship, Samson hails Iole as a saviour, and Hercules warns Samson against Delilah. He dives overboard to swim ashore while the Greeks sail away.

== Cast ==
- Kirk Morris: Hercules
- Iloosh Khoshabe: Samson (aka Richard Lloyd)
- Enzo Cerusico: Ulysses
- Liana Orfei: Delilah
- Diletta D'Andrea: Leria
- Fulvia Franco: Ithaca Queen (Ulysses' mother Anticleia)
- Aldo Giuffrè: Seren
- Pietro Tordi: Azer

== Film continuity ==
Hercules, Samson and Ulysses is a sequel to the 1959 film Hercules Unchained and the 1958 film Hercules both starring Steve Reeves, the first actor to portray the mythical hero in a motion picture. Hercules, Samson and Ulysses is the third Hercules film written and directed by Pietro Francisci. Fans may easily recognize several of the supporting cast from the two previous films who served as crew members of the legendary Argo featured in the earlier films. Hercules, Samson and Ulysses also maintains a continuity in its story, including Hercules' married life, and the country Hercules lives in as Ithaca which is ruled by King Laertes. Hercules' closest companion is still Ulysses who continues using carrier birds to send messages back to Ithaca as seen in Hercules Unchained. Ulysses' portrayal is similar to that seen in the Reeves films, including dating a young woman named Penelope who worries about him during his distant adventures.

There are noticeable changes in the main casting. As Steve Reeves' career quickly took off after the success of the first Hercules film that began the sword & sandal film craze of the early and mid 1960s, Reeves was unavailable to return to the role of Hercules with his obligation to the film Sandokan the Great in 1963. Italian bodybuilder Kirk Morris was cast in the role of Hercules. The faithful sidekick of Hercules featured Italian actor Enzo Cerusico as opposed to Gabriele Antonini who played the supporting role of Ulysses in both Reeves films. Italian actor Andrea Fantasia maintained his role as King Laertes of Ithaca from the Reeves films. Actress/model Sylva Koscina was unavailable in 1963, and the role of Hercules' wife Iole, was portrayed by actress Diletta D'Andrea. The third film also suggests a time lapse in which Hercules and Iole have a young boy.

== Crossover ==
The film sets Hercules' adventure in Judea, a land largely referred to in biblical accounts. There are vague biblical references including the film's second strongman Samson, also referred to as Samson the Danite, an enemy and fugitive of the Philistines. The film's subplot centers around the established fact that the fugitive Samson possesses God-given strength to kill wild animals--specifically lions--with his bare hands. When Hercules arrives in Judea and displays similar strength to slay a lion with his bare hands, he is mistaken by the Philistine king Seren for Samson as he heard prophecy foretell his death by Samson's hands.

The film also features a femme fatale named Delilah, mistress of the Philistine king Seren. The film selectively chooses elements from the biblical account of Delilah and portrays her as a cunning seductress who first meets and persuades Hercules to capture Samson in exchange for the lives of his friends held prisoner by King Seren. After her plan fails she is shown mercy by Samson, who is charmed by her beauty and agrees to let her return to King Seren. Hercules realizes Samson has fallen in love with Delilah and cautions him against her skillful deception. Delilah reneges on her promise to help Hercules and Samson escape the Philistines. She betrays the two heroes and sets a trap with the Philistine king. Hercules and Samson overcome the trap laid for them and the king is killed in battle by Samson. Towards the film's end there is a vague reference made to the biblical account of Samson and Delilah when Hercules warns Samson once more to beware of any further deception by Delilah.

Not only the crossover but this and the previous movies' pairing of Hercules and Ulysses are hilariously impossible in actual history. Whether the three title characters are real people or mythological, Hercules would have been associated with a generation around 1234 B.C., Ulysses would have lived around 1184 B.C., and Samson would have lived around 1100 B.C.

== Release ==
Hercules, Samson and Ulysses opened on December 20, 1963, in Italy. It was released in May 1965 in the United States.

== See also ==
- List of films featuring Hercules
