= Franco Parenti =

Italian actor and stage director (1921–1989)

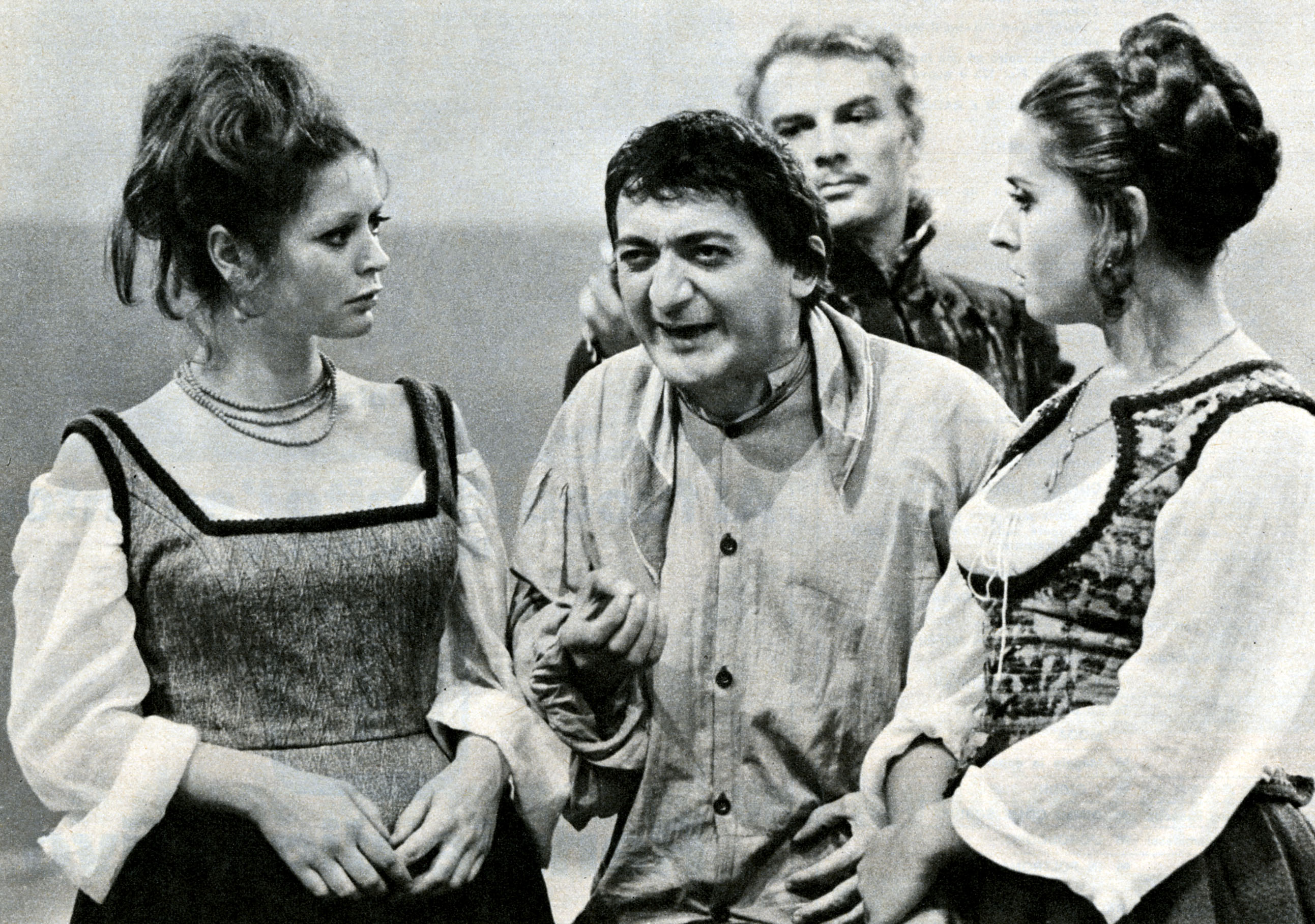
- Milla Sannoner, Parenti, Giorgio Albertazzi and Gianna Giachetti on stage (1967)
- Born: 7 December 1921; Milan, Italy
- Died: 28 April 1989 (aged 67); Milan, Italy

Franco Parenti (7 December 1921 – 28 April 1989) was an Italian actor and stage director.

== Biography ==
Born in Milan, Parenti graduated from the Accademia dei Filodrammatici and made his professional debut in 1940, in the Merlini-Cialante stage company. In 1941, he formed the avangarde stage company Palcoscenico with Paolo Grassi. During the World War II he was drafted and interned in Germany, being freed in 1945.

After the war, Parenti worked with the companies of Salvo Randone and Nuto Navarrini, before joining the first stage company of the Piccolo Teatro in Milan. Starting from 1948, he focused on avanspettacolo, joining among others the companies of Erminio Macario, Giorgio De Rege, and Pina Renzi, and also working as author of sketches. In the early 1950s, he got his first personal success on radio with the macchietta Anacleto il gasista, and formed a successful avanspettacolo company with Dario Fo and Giustino Durano. After the company disbandment in 1954, Parenti returned to dramatic theater, working with Luigi Squarzina and Gianfranco De Bosio.

In 1963, Parenti was named director of the Teatro Stabile in Palermo, and after working with Eduardo De Filippo and Giorgio Strehler, in 1972 he co-founded with Andrée Ruth Shammah the Teatro Pier Lombardo (also known as Cooperativa Teatro Franco Parenti), with which he staged a series of sophisticated and often provocative plays. He died of lung cancer on 28 April 1989, at the age of 67.
