= John the Bastard (film) =

1967 film

- Directed by: Armando Crispino
- Written by: Armando Crispino; Lucio Battistrada
- Produced by: Francesco & Vincenzo Genesi
- Starring: John Richardson; Claudio Camaso; Martine Beswick
- Cinematography: Sante Achilli
- Edited by: Franco Fraticelli
- Music by: Nico Fidenco
- Release date: 1967
- Languages: Italian; English

John the Bastard (Italian: John il bastardo) is a 1967 Italian Spaghetti Western film written and directed by Armando Crispino and starring John Richardson. The film is a western adaptation of Wolfgang Amadeus Mozart's opera Don Giovanni.

== Plot ==
John is the illegitimate son of a wealthy landowner. He decides to take revenge for the disinterest that his father has always shown towards him. He becomes the lover of his stepbrother's wife and when he challenges him to a duel he kills him. The woman commits suicide and John, satisfied, continues his cynical existence until the relatives of other women seduced by him try to kill him.

== Cast ==
- John Richardson as John Donald Tenorio
- Claudio Camaso as Don Francisco Tenorio
- Martine Beswick as Dona Antonia
- Claudio Gora as Don Diego Tenorio
- Furio Meniconi as Papa Buck
- Gordon Mitchell as Danite
- Glauco Onorato as Morenillo
- Gia Sandri as Gertrude
- Luisa Della Noce as Sara
- Nadia Scarpitta as Chica
- Patrizia Valturri as Edith
- Thelma Anderson
- Vittorio Manfrino
- Loredana Giustini
- Mirella Pompili
- Piero Vida as Sacerdote
- Margherita Horowitz as Old Maid Aunt
- Remo De Angelis
- Claudia Gravy
- Román Ariznavarreta as Hermano de Gertrode
