= Fort Yuma Gold =

1966 film

- Directed by: Giorgio Ferroni
- Screenplay by: Augusto Finocchi; Massimilano Capriccioli; Sandro Continenza; Remigio Del Grosso; Leonardo Martin; Gilles Demoulin
- Story by: Augusto Finocchi; Massimilano Capriccioli; Sandro Continenza; Remigio Del Grosso; Leonardo Martin; Gilles Demoulin
- Produced by: Edmondo Amati
- Starring: Giuliano Gemma; Dan Vadis; Jose Calvo
- Cinematography: Rafael Pacheco
- Edited by: Antonietta Zita
- Music by: Ennio Morricone; Gianni Ferrio
- Production companies: Fida Cinematografica; Les Productions Jacques Roitfield; Epoca Film
- Release date: 7 October 1966 (Italy)
- Running time: 100 minutes
- Countries: Italy; France; Spain
- Language: Italian

Fort Yuma Gold (Italian: Per pochi dollari ancora, lit. 'For a Few Extra Dollars') is a 1966 Italian/Spanish/French international co-production Spaghetti Western film directed by Giorgio Ferroni.

== Plot ==
Confederate Major Sanders (Jacques Sernas), continues fighting the North after the conclusion of the American Civil War. Former Rebel Gary Diamond (Giuliano Gemma), now a guide, leads a pair of Union soldiers to obstruct Sanders before he can pull off a raid on Fort Yuma. However the others are unaware that Diamond knows that one of the Union officers is actually Sanders' spy. More complications ensue, pairing Diamond with the aptly named saloon-girl Connie Breastful (Sophie Daumier). Later Diamond is found to be a traitor and is tortured severely before Sanders' plot is foiled.

== Cast ==
- Giuliano Gemma (as Montgomery Wood) as Gary Diamond
- Jacques Sernas as Maj. Sanders
- Dan Vadis as Nelson Riggs
- Sophie Daumier as Connie Breastfull
- Nello Pazzafini (as Red Carter) as Sgt. Brian Pitt
- José Calvo as Gordon/Golden .44
- Ángel del Pozo as Capt. Lefevre
- Jacques Herlin (as Arlen Jacques) as Riggs as prisoner, Davis camp
- Andrea Bosic as Colonel as Davis camp
- Antonio Molino Rojo as Brian
- Benny Reeves as Juko
- Furio Meniconi (as Men Fury) as Calvin/Johnny Newman
- José Manuel Martín as Sam
- Jacques Stany as Elijah Murdock
- Lorenzo Robledo as Capt. Taylor
- Riccardo Pizzuti as Corporal Wilson

== Release ==
Fort Yuma Gold was released in Italy on October 7, 1966. The film was also released with the English title The Rebel Lieutenant.

== Reception ==
From contemporary reviews, an anonymous reviewer in the Monthly Film Bulletin described the film as "Utterly routine" with "unconvincinving fights, witless dialogue and prolonged torture, and the hero is another those unprepossessing supermen" and that the film was only distinguished by "the amazing gullibility of the villains who nonchalantly shrug off the sudden deaths of most of their colleagues as accidental."

A retrospective review on AllMovie by Robert Firsching referred to the film as a "well-paced spaghetti western" with a "labyrinthine storyline". Firsching noted that Ferroni's film "sometimes crosses the line into silliness, but remains entertaining throughout, aided by a fine score by Ennio Morricone and Gianni Ferrio."
