= Vulcan, Son of Giove =

Vulcan, Son of Jove
- Film poster
- Directed by: Emimmo Salvi
- Screenplay by: Benito Ilforte; Ambrogio Molteni; Emimmo Salvi; Gino Stafford
- Story by: Emimmo Salvi
- Produced by: Spartaco Antonucci
- Starring: Bella Cortez; Rod Flash Ilush; Roger Browne; Annie Gorassini; Furio Meniconi; Gordon Mitchell
- Cinematography: Mario Parapetti
- Edited by: Otello Colangeli
- Music by: Marcello Giombini
- Release date: March 17, 1962 (Italy)
- Running time: 80 minutes (Italy); 76 minutes (USA); 78 minutes (West Germany)
- Country: Italy
- Language: Italian

Vulcan, Son of Jove (Italian: Vulcano, figlio di Giove) is a 1962 Italian fantasy-adventure film directed and co-written by Emimmo Salvi in his directorial debut. The film is also known as Vulcan, Son of Jupiter (American TV title). The film was partly shot in Iran.

== Plot summary ==
Following a dispute between Jupiter and Mars the latter descends to Earth. Together with Venus he instructs the Thracians how to erect a castle which is supposed to become more beautiful than Mount Olympus. Jupiter assigns Vulcan and Etna to find Mars. Eventually the Thracians capture Etna and torture her. Vulcan saves her life and incites the slaves of the Thracians into an uprising. Mars and Venus try to return to Olympus but Jupiter sends Vulcan back to Earth to be with Etna.

== Cast ==
- Bella Cortez as Etna
- Iloosh Khoshabe as Vulcan (billed as Rod Flash Ilush)
- Roger Browne as Mars
- Annie Gorassini as Venus
- Furio Meniconi as Jupiter
- Gordon Mitchell as Pluto
- Omero Gargano as Neptune
- Isarco Ravaioli as Mercurius
- Liliana Zagra as Nymph
- Salvatore Furnari as Geo the midget
- Ugo Sabetta as Milos, King of the Thracians
- Edda Ferronao as Erida, Goddess of Hate
- Yonne Scirè as Juno - Jupiter's Wife
- Amedeo Trilli
- Paolo Pieri

== Reception ==
The film's romantic scenes have been dismissed as lacking chemistry.

== Biography ==
- Hughes, Howard (2011). Cinema Italiano - The Complete Guide From Classics To Cult. London - New York: I.B.Tauris. ISBN 978-1-84885-608-0.
