= Kill or Be Killed (1966 film) =

1966 film

- Directed by: Tanio Boccia
- Written by: Mario Amendola
- Cinematography: Aldo Giordani
- Music by: Carlo Rustichelli
- Release date: 1966
- Language: Italian

Kill or Be Killed (Italian: Uccidi o muori, also known as Ringo Against Johnny Colt and Kill or Die) is a 1966 Italian Spaghetti Western film directed by Tanio Boccia.

== Cast ==
- Rod Dana: Johnny Ringo (credited as Robert Mark)
- Elina DeWitt: Lisa Drumont
- Gordon Mitchell: Baltimore Joe
- Andrea Bosic: Sheriff
- Fabrizio Moroni: Spott Griffith
- Alberto Farnese: Chester Griffith
- Beniamino Maggio: Petrack
- Furio Meniconi: Jonathan Griffith
- Remo Capitani
- Renato Terra
