= Ali Baba and the Seven Saracens =

1964 film

- Directed by: Emimmo Salvi
- Written by: Emimmo Salvi; Benito Ilforte; Sergio Tocci
- Story by: Carlo Infascelli
- Produced by: Samuel Z. Arkoff; James H. Nicholson
- Starring: Gordon Mitchell
- Cinematography: Mario Parapetti
- Music by: Italo Fischetti
- Production company: Avis Film
- Distributed by: Telixport; Indipendenti Regionali
- Release date: 1964
- Language: Italian

Ali Baba and the Seven Saracens (Italian: Sindbad contro i sette saraceni, also known as Sinbad Against the 7 Saracens) is a 1964 Italian adventure film written and directed by Emimmo Salvi and starring Gordon Mitchell. The film was released straight to television in the United States by American International Television in 1965.

== Plot ==
A rebel leader returns to his city for a final confrontation with the evil king he is fighting. However, he finds himself attracted to the king's beautiful niece

== Cast ==
- Gordon Mitchell as Omar
- Dan Harrison as Sindbad / Ali Baba
- Bella Cortez as Princess Fatima
- Carla Calò as Farida, Omar's lover
- Lilli Zander as Fatima's friend
- Maria Pia Conte as Fatima's friend
- Franco Doria as Jukki
- Luigi Tosi as Meneth
- Amedeo Trilli as Haswan
- Tony Di Mitri as Sharif
- Alberto Conversi as Momet
- Artemio Antonini as Kassim
- Renato Terra Caizzi as Saracen Leader
- Bruno Carotenuto as Saracen Leader
