= Grand Canyon Massacre =

1964 film

- Italian film poster
- Directed by: Sergio Corbucci
- Screenplay by: Albert Band; Stanley Corbett; Dialogue: Fede Arnaud
- Story by: Edward C. Geltman
- Produced by: Albert Band
- Starring: James Mitchum; Jill Powers; George Ardisson; Burt Nelson; Milla Sannoner; G.R. Stuart; Edward Ciannelli
- Cinematography: Enzo Barboni
- Edited by: Franco Fraticelli
- Music by: Gianni Ferrio
- Production companies: Ultra Film; Pro-Di Cinematografica
- Distributed by: Titanus
- Release date: May 1964
- Running time: 89 minutes
- Country: Italy
- Language: Italian

Grand Canyon Massacre (Italian: Massacro al Grande Canyon, lit. "Massacre at Grand Canyon") is a 1964 Italian Spaghetti Western filmed in Croatia starring James Mitchum, Milla Sannoner, and George Ardisson. It was directed by Sergio Corbucci and produced by Albert Band. The film's theme song was performed by Rod Dana. The film has nothing to do with the Grand Canyon.

== Plot ==
Wes Evans has completed his quest in finding and killing the Slade brothers, who murdered his father, the sheriff of Arriba Mesa. Returning home, Wes is stopped by a large amount of gunmen in Butte Canyon, whose presence is a mystery. Wes escapes and returns home to Arriba Mesa. The judge offers him the job as sheriff and Cooley, the holder of the office and a friend of Wes, is anxious to step down. Wes however only wants to settle down, but when he learns that his love Nancy (who believed Wes to be dead) has married Tully Dancer, he decides to leave again.

However he is drawn into the ongoing range war between the Dancer family and Harley Whitmore. When learning that the Dancers have called in an outlaw gang led by the notorious Flake Manson and his brothers, the gang that Wes escaped from, Whitmore acts quickly and rides with a large body of men against the Dancer ranch. They are ambushed by Tully Dancer's men at a pass and the groups entrench against each other. Wes, who worries for Nancy, negotiates a truce: Whitmore will refrain from pushing through and the Dancers will send off the Manson gang. Tully and his father decide to secretly offer Flake Manson more money to get him to act, even if this endangers the life of Tully's brother Clay, who is sent to Whitmore as a hostage for the truce.

Wes and Cooley arrest the other Manson brothers that are in town, one of them when he tries to rape Nancy. However, Tully finds Flake and they besiege the prison and leave men to hold Wes pinned while they attack Whitmore's force. Wes and Cooley (with the help of Nancy) manage to trick the men into revealing themselves and kill them, but Cooley dies too. Wes convinces the townspeople to take sides and ride to the pass. Tully and Flake, who had Whitmore between two fires, now suffer the same fate. Wes kills Flake and Tully escapes with Wes in hot pursuit.

Tully tries to set fire to the disputed grassland, but he is killed by Fred, a farmer who earlier had lost a leg in the range war. Wes arrives with the corpse of Tully just in time to stop Whitmore from hanging Clay. Wes will stay on as sheriff, with Nancy by his side.

== Cast ==
- James Mitchum as Wes Evans
- Gabriella Pallotta as Nancy
- George Ardisson as Tully Dancer
- Giacomo Rossi-Stuart as Sheriff Burt Cooley
- Burt Nelson as Bear Mason
- Milla Sannoner as Flake's Girlfriend
- Eduardo Ciannelli as Eric Dancer
- Andrea Giordana as Clay Dancer
- Ferdinando Poggi as Ace Mason
- Benito Stefanelli as Gunman
- Renato Terra as Cureley Mason
- Vladimir Medar as Harley Whitmore
- Vlastimir Gavrik as Bear Mason
- Attilio Severini as Flake Mason

== Release ==
Grand Canyon Massacre was released in May 1964.

== Reception ==
In his investigation of narrative structures in Spaghetti Western films, Fridlund argues that the story of Grand Canyon Massacre basically conforms to the "Classical plot", as described by Will Wright referring to US westerns like Shane but adds that there are a couple of scenes reminding of the visual style that would later be developed in the westerns by Sergio Leone.
