= Wanted (1967 film) =

1967 film

- Italian theatrical release poster
- Directed by: Giorgio Ferroni
- Screenplay by: Fernando Di Leo; Augusto Finocchi
- Story by: Massimiliano Capriccioli; Augusto Finocchi
- Produced by: Gianni Hech Lucari
- Starring: Giuliano Gemma; Teresa Gimpera; Serge Marquand; German Cobos
- Cinematography: Tony Secchi
- Edited by: Antonietta Zita
- Music by: Gianni Ferrio
- Production company: Documento
- Distributed by: Variety Distribution
- Release date: 1967
- Running time: 104 minutes
- Country: Italy

Wanted is a 1967 Italian Western film directed by Giorgio Ferroni and starring Giuliano Gemma, Teresa Gimpera, and Nello Pazzafini. Gemma made two more westerns directed by Ferroni, with similar plots, where his character likewise carried the first name "Gary".

== Plot ==
Gary Ryan, a local sheriff (Giuliano Gemma) is unjustly accused of murder in a small town and forced to flee. He gets rid of his enemies one by one while he tries to prove his innocence.

== Cast ==
- Giuliano Gemma as Gary Ryan
- Germán Cobos as Martin Heywood
- Teresa Gimpera as Evelyn
- Serge Marquand as Fred Lloyd
- Daniele Vargas as Mayor Samuel "Gold" Goldensberg
- Gia Sandri as Cheryl
- Nello Pazzafini as Father Carmelo
- Benito Stefanelli as Bob Baker
- Carlo Hintermann as Judge Anderson
- Tullio Altamura as Ellis
- Riccardo Pizzuti as Mathias
- Franco Balducci as Cuzack

== Release ==
Wanted was first released in 1967.

== Reception ==
From contemporary reviews, an anonymous reviewer in the Monthly Film Bulletin noted that "the violence in this Western is excessive even by Italian imitation standards. Still, the plot is a for a change refreshingly straight-forward [...] and the location photography is particularly attractive."
