= Iloosh Khoshabe =

Iranian bodybuilder and actor (1932–2012)

- ایلوش خوشابه
- Born: Ilush Khoshabe; 1932; Urmia, Iran
- Died: 2012 (aged 79–80); Tehran, Iran
- Occupation: actor
- Years active: 1955-1995

Ilush Khoshabe (1932–2012) was an Iranian bodybuilder and actor who was born to Assyrian parents in Geogtapa, Iran. In Assyrian, the name Khoshabe (or Khoshaba) means 'Sunday.' He appeared in a number of films produced across the Middle East and Europe under a variety of pseudonyms, including Rod Flash Ilush, Richard Lloyd, Iloosh Khoshabe, and the mononyms Ilush and Iloosh.

Khoshabe is best known for starring in Italian peplum films produced in the early 1960s, including Vulcan, Son of Jupiter and The Seven Tasks of Ali Baba (both 1962), as well as Hercules, Samson and Ulysses (1963) and The Invincible Brothers Maciste (1964).

== Selected filmography ==
- Prince Arsalan (aka Amir Arsalan-e namdar) (1955) as Amir Arsalan (billed as Ilush)
- Vulcan, Son of Jupiter (1962) as Vulcan (billed as Rod Flash Ilush)
- The Seven Tasks of Ali Baba (1962) as Ali Baba (billed as Rod Flash Ilush)
- Hercules, Samson and Ulysses (1963) as Samson (billed as Richard Lloyd)
- The Invincible Brothers Maciste (1964) as Machiste the Older (billed as Richard Lloyd)
