= The Revenge of Ivanhoe =

- Directed by: Tanio Boccia
- Music by: Giuseppe Piccillo
- Release date: 1965
- Country: Italy
- Language: Italian

The Revenge of Ivanhoe (Italian: La rivincita di Ivanhoe) is a 1965 Italian adventure film directed by Tanio Boccia.

== Plot ==
A disguised knight rescues a wounded prisoner held by Cedric of Hastings men. The knight and prisoner escape and during a thunderstorm hides the prisoner while he goes for help. The knight meets the hermit Ethlebald who recognizes him as Ivanhoe. They return to the prisoner and find that he has been taken by a band of Saxon outlaws led by Lockheel. Ethelbald, a friend of the outlaws leads Ivanhoe to the camp. Ivanhoe tells the prisoner he recognized him as his fiancée Rowena's brother, Arthur, who tells Ivanhoe she is being held captive by Cedric and was on his way to rescue her. Cedric wants Rowena to marry Sir Brian Godwald so he can acquire a third of her dowry, as promised by King John (who gets the other two-thirds). He had planned to convince her by torturing her brother, but when he learns of his escape decides to have Rowena tried for treason instead.

At the trial, Rowena is found guilty when Wilfred Cox lies under oath. Rowena claims the right to be defended by a champion in battle. Bertrand will fight against any such champion. Ivanhoe appears in disguise as Rowena's champion, defeating Bertrand but sparing his life. Ivanhoe leaves without revealing his identity and is followed by Cox. Rowena requests that she be returned to her castle and is told that this will be done the following day. Cox follows Ivanhoe to the outlaw camp and when the outlaws leave to attack Cedric's men who are on their way to destroy the nearby village, he enters and finds Arthur. He tells Arthur that Cedric has broken his word and is keeping Rowena prisoner but has a plan to free her, with Arthur's help, by entering the castle through a secret passage. The outlaws defeat Cedric's men at the village and return to the camp where they find Arthur gone. Ethelbald is convinced he has been captured by Cedric's men, which is correct as he has been betrayed by Cox once they entered the castle. The next morning Rowena is shown her brother in the dungeon and Cedric tells her that even under torture he has not revealed the name of her champion and that the torture will continue unless she agrees to marry Brian, which she does.

On his way to the wedding Brian is captured by the outlaws and taken to Ivanhoe, who convinces him that Rowena was forced into agreeing to the marriage. Brian agrees not to go ahead with wedding. Ivanhoe goes to the castle impersonating Brian. When "Brian" is introduced to Rowena, she recognizes him as Ivanhoe, but pretends not to. That night Ivanhoe secretly visits Rowena in her room while Ethlebald frees Arthur. Arthur rouses the villagers who together with the outlaws are to attack the castle the next day. He shows Lockheel and a few outlaws the secret passage while the rest wait outside for their signal to attack. During the wedding ceremony they attack and are victorious. Ivanhoe kills Bertrand in single combat. Cedric is also apparently killed. As the victors leave a messenger from King John arrives and reads a proclamation announcing the ends of feudalism in England.

== Cast ==
- Rik Van Nutter (credited as Clyde Rogers) as Ivanhoe
- Gilda Lousek as Rowena of Stratford
- Andrea Aureli as Bertrand of Hastings
- Duilio Marzio as Cedric of Hastings
- Glauco Onorato as Lockheel
- Furio Meniconi as Etimbaldo
- Nando Tamberlani as Prior of Wessex
- Tullio Altamura as Wilfred Cox
- Nerio Bernardi as Donald, Dungeon master
