= Benito Stefanelli =

Italian actor (1928–1999)

- Stefanelli in Day of Anger (1967)
- Born: 2 September 1928; Rome, Italy
- Died: 18 December 1999 (age 71); Rome, Italy
- Occupations: Actor, Stuntman

Benito Stefanelli (2 September 1928 – 18 December 1999) was an Italian film actor, stuntman and weapons master who made over 60 appearances in film between 1955 and 1991.

== Biography and career ==
Stefanelli is best known in world cinema for his roles as henchmen in several of Sergio Leone's Spaghetti Western films, portraying gang members in the trilogy of films A Fistful of Dollars (1964), For a Few Dollars More (1965), and The Good, the Bad and the Ugly (1966). He played the town drunk in Wanted (1967) starring Giuliano Gemma and Serge Marquand.

In his career, Stefanelli appeared in countless other western films and he worked simultaneously as a stunt coordinator (particularly during the 1960s and early 1970s) on the films that he performed in including those of Sergio Leone. A fluent English speaker, he also reportedly served as Clint Eastwood's interpreter together with Bill Thompkins on the set of A Fistful of Dollars.

== Selected filmography ==
- Ulysses (1954) – Elatos (uncredited)
- Il terrore della maschera rossa (1960)
- Messalina (1960)
- La strada dei giganti (1960)
- La sceriffa (1960)
- L'ultimo dei vichinghi (1961) – Lorig, amico di Guntar (uncredited)
- Capitani di ventura (1961)
- The Trojan Horse (1961)
- Duel of the Titans (1961) – Soldato con Amulio
- The Slave (1962) – Nordic blond slave
- The Avenger (1962) – Nisius, Euryalus' Friend
- A Queen for Caesar (1962) – Commerciante #2 (uncredited)
- Revenge of the Musketeers (1963)
- Zorro and the Three Musketeers (1963)
- Rocambole (1963) – Fritz
- L'ultima carica (1964)
- Grand Canyon Massacre (1964) – Gunman
- Castle of Blood (1964) – William
- A Fistful of Dollars (1964) – Rubio
- Per un dollaro a Tucson si muore (1964) – Charlie
- Revenge of The Gladiators (1964) – Ardenzio, gladiatore
- Blood for a Silver Dollar (1965) – James
- For a Few Dollars More (1965) – Luke 'Hughie' (Indio's Gang)
- Secret Agent Super Dragon (1966) - Kirk
- The Upper Hand (1966)
- 100.000 dollari per Lassiter (1966) – Donovan, Foreman
- Ypotron – Final Countdown (1966) – Il sicario Dwan
- For a Few Extra Dollars (1966) – Juko
- The Big Gundown (1966) – Jess, Widow's Ranchero
- The Good, the Bad and the Ugly (1966) – Member of Angel Eyes' Gang #1
- The Hellbenders (1967) – Slim the Gambler
- Wanted (1967) – Billy Baker
- Gentleman Killer (1967) – Larry
- Kill the Wicked! (1967)
- Day of Anger (1967) – Owen White, Killer
- Gunman Sent by God (1968)
- A Sky Full of Stars for a Roof (1968) – Rick (uncredited)
- Once Upon a Time in the West (1968) – Frank's Lieutenant (uncredited)
- Cemetery Without Crosses (1969) – Ben Caine (uncredited)
- The Price of Power (1969) – Sheriff Jefferson
- Night of the Serpent (1969) – Pancho
- Er Più – storia d'amore e di coltello (1971) – Alfredo Di Lorenzo
- W Django! (1971) – Ibanez
- Trinity Is Still My Name (1971) – Stingary Smith
- Duck, You Sucker! (1971) – Soldier torturing Dr. Villega (deleted scene)
- So Sweet, So Dead (1972) – Lilly's Husband
- A Reason to Live, a Reason to Die (1972) – Samuel Pickett un ex condannato
- Le Amazzoni – Donne d'amore e di guerra (1973) – Erno
- My Name Is Nobody (1973) – Porteley
- War Goddess (1973) – Commander
- Charleston (1974) – Niccolo Cappocello (uncredited)
- White Fang to the Rescue (1974) – Jackson
- Violent Rome (1975) – Grocery Store Robber (uncredited)
- A Genius, Two Partners and a Dupe (1975) – Mortimer
- The Cop in Blue Jeans (1976) – Shelley's Henchman
- Crimebusters (1976) – Rapist (uncredited)
- Hit Squad (1976) – Gorniani, Attorney-at-Law
- El Macho (1977) – Sheriff
- The Payoff (1978) – Improta
- The Pumaman (1980) – Rankin, Kobras' Lieutenant
- La guerra del ferro – Ironmaster (1983) – Iskay
- White Fire (1985) – Barbossa (uncredited)
- Ladyhawke (1985) – Bishop's Guard (uncredited)
- Warbus (1986) – Debrard (uncredited)
- The Barbarians (1987) – Greyshaft (uncredited)
- Cobra Verde (1987) – Captain Pedro Vicente
- Un maledetto soldato (1988) – Andrew Teitelman (uncredited)
- Phantom of Death (1988) – Man in Restroom (uncredited)
- Transformations (1988) – Vapes
- The Pit and the Pendulum (1991) – Lobo the Executioner (final film role)
