= The Seven Tasks of Ali Baba =

The Seven Tasks of Ali Baba (Italian: Le 7 fatiche di Alì Babà) is a 1962 Italian adventure film directed by Emimmo Salvi and featuring Bella Cortez, Salvatore Furnari and Iloosh Khoshabe in lead roles.
