= Amedeo Trilli =

Italian film and television actor (1906–1971)

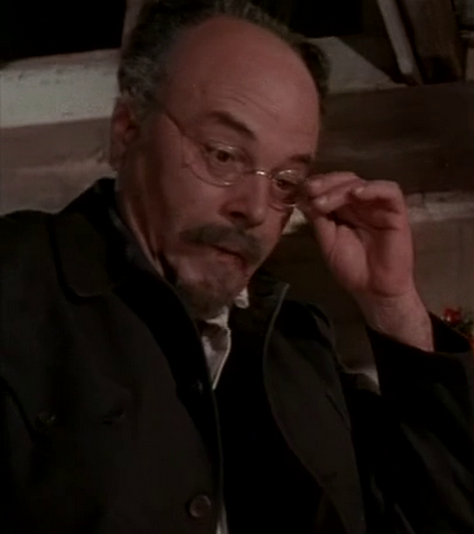
- Born: 9 July 1906; Ronciglione, Italy
- Died: 30 November 1971 (aged 65); Rome, Italy
- Occupation: Actor

Amedeo Trilli (9 July 1906 – 30 November 1971) was an Italian film and television actor.

== Life and career ==
Born in Ronciglione, Viterbo, at very young age Trilli worked as a circus artist, then in 1922 he studied performance at the Accademia di Santa Cecilia and later he started working on stage. He made his film debut in the early days of the sound films, and from the 1940s his presence on the big screen became continuous. One of the most active character actors in Italian genre cinema, Trilli also got some leading roles in a number of low budget films, sometimes credited as Amedeo Novelli.

== Selected filmography ==
- Pergolesi (1932)
- La Wally (1932)
- Princess Tarakanova (1938)
- Cardinal Messias (1939)
- The Two Tigers (1941)
- Document Z-3 (1942)
- The Gorgon (1942)
- A Little Wife (1943)
- The Ten Commandments (1945)
- Turri il bandito (1950)
- Father's Dilemma (1950)
- Il richiamo nella tempesta (1950)
- The Cliff of Sin (1950)
- Destiny (1951)
- Tomorrow Is Another Day (1951)
- The Bandit of Tacca Del Lupo (1952)
- Il prezzo dell'onore (1952)
- Guilt Is Not Mine (1952)
- Frontier Wolf (1952)
- Francis the Smuggler (1953)
- Peppino e la vecchia signora (1954)
- Disowned (1954)
- Serenata a Maria (1957)
- Revolt of the Mercenaries (1961)
- Hawk of the Caribbean (1962)
- I diavoli di Spartivento (1963)
- Revolt of the Praetorians (1964)
- Ali Baba and the Seven Saracens (1964)
- Treasure of the Petrified Forest (1965)
- Giant of the Evil Island (1965)
- Serafino (1968)
