= Gordon Mitchell =

American actor and bodybuilder (1923–2003)

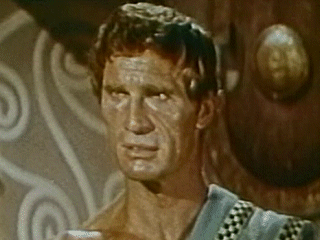
- Born: Charles Allen Pendleton; July 29, 1923; Denver, Colorado, U.S.
- Died: September 20, 2003 (aged 80); Marina Del Rey, California, U.S.
- Education: University of Southern California
- Occupations: Film actor; bodybuilder

Gordon Mitchell (born Charles Allen Pendleton; July 29, 1923 – September 20, 2003) was an American actor and bodybuilder, known for his starring roles in Italian sword-and-sandal and Spaghetti Western films.

== Early life ==
Charles Allen Pendleton was born in Denver, Colorado, and began working out in his Denver neighborhood to deal with his tough companions.

During World War II, he served in the U.S. Army in the Battle of the Bulge where he was taken prisoner of war. He later obtained a degree at the University of Southern California under the G.I. Bill. He became a high school teacher and guidance counselor in Los Angeles, where due to his physique he was given classes containing many delinquent students.

== Career ==
Following a return enlistment for the Korean War, he found film extra work in movies such as Prisoner of War, The Man with the Golden Arm and Cecil B. DeMille's The Ten Commandments, where he and his friend Joe Gold dragged Charlton Heston's Moses to Pharaoh Yul Brynner. Mae West chose him to appear in her nightclub act as part of her "buffed all-male chorus line".

He was one of the American bodybuilder-actors who migrated to Italy in the wake of Steve Reeves' success in the 1958 film Hercules after he sent a photo to an Italian producer who signed him on a contract. Prior to going to Italy, he saw a clairvoyant who asked him if he had ever been known by the name of Gordon Mitchell. He replied no, but on arrival in Rome, Mitchell was given his new name. He found work first in sword and sandal films such as Sinbad, Seven Slaves Against the World, Treasure of the Petrified Forest (1965), then in Spaghetti Westerns such as Beyond the Law and Savage Guns. Mitchell also appeared in Fellini Satyricon (1969), directed by Federico Fellini.

From the early 1970s onwards, he started to diversify into everything from horror (Frankenstein's Castle of Freaks), Nazi exploitation (Achtung! The Desert Tigers!), sexploitation (Porno-Erotic Western), French criminal comedy (The Umbrella Coup), and post-apocalyptic films (Endgame). He also appeared in the bizarre 1982 Israeli adaptation of H. Rider Haggard's She as "Hector." The film was directed by Avi Nesher and co-starred Sandahl Bergman.

Mitchell was close friends with fellow American expatriate actors Richard Harrison, Mike Monty (he appeared in a number of films with both and shared an apartment with Monty in Italy during the 1960s), and John P. Dulaney. Like Monty, Harrison and Dulaney, Mitchell acted in low-budget action films in the Philippines during the 1980s, having roles in Commando Invasion and SFX Retaliator for director John Gale.

He returned to the United States in the late 1980s and largely retired from acting, becoming the chief operating officer of World Gym in Marina Del Rey, California. He kept making occasional film appearances until his death.

== Death ==
Mitchell died on September 20, 2003, at age 80, from an apparent heart attack.

== Selected filmography ==
- Prisoner of War (1954) - Bit Role (uncredited)
- The Man with the Golden Arm (1955) - Police Officer (uncredited)
- The Ten Commandments (1956) - Egyptian Guard (uncredited)
- Around the World in 80 Days (1956) - Extra (uncredited)
- The Spirit of St. Louis (1957) - (uncredited)
- The Enemy Below (1957) - German Sailor (uncredited)
- The Young Lions (1958) - Minor Role (uncredited)
- The Buccaneer (1958) - Pirate (uncredited)
- Rio Bravo (1959) - Bar Cowboy Watching Fistfight (uncredited)
- Li'l Abner (1959) - Muscleman Rufe (uncredited)
- Spartacus (1960) - Gladiator (uncredited)
- Atlas Against the Cyclops (1961) - Maciste (as Mitchell Gordon)
- The Centurion (1961) - Gen. Metellus
- The Giant of Metropolis (1961) - Obro
- Vulcan, Son of Jupiter (1962) - Pluto
- Julius Caesar Against the Pirates (1962) - Hamar, the Pirate
- Kerim, Son of the Sheik (1962) - Yussuf
- Invasion 1700 (1962) - Ulrich
- The Fury of Achilles (1962) - Achilles
- Brennus, Enemy of Rome (1963) - Brennus
- Seven Slaves Against the World (1964) - Balisten
- La vendetta di Spartacus (1964) - Arminio
- Ali Baba and the Seven Saracens (1964) - Omar
- Erik, il vichingo (1965) - Sven / Bjarni
- Treasure of the Petrified Forest (1965) - Hunding
- Lady Morgan's Vengeance (1965) - Roger
- 3 Bullets for Ringo (1966) - Frank Sanders
- Star Pilot (1966) - Murdu
- Thompson 1880 (1966) - Glenn Sheppard
- Kill or Be Killed (1966) - Baltimore Joe
- È mezzanotte... butta giù il cadavere (1966) - Van Himst
- L'estate (1966) - Himself
- Born to Kill (1967) - Roose
- Death on the Run (1967) - The Albanian
- Reflections in a Golden Eye (1967) - Stable Sergeant
- John the Bastard (1967) - Danite
- Phenomenal and the Treasure of Tutankhamen (1968) - Gregory Falco
- Sapevano solo uccidere (1968) - Clayton
- Cin cin... cianuro (1968) - Al Rubino
- Beyond the Law (1968) - Burton
- The Killer Likes Candy (1968) - Toni
- All on the Red (1968) - Erikson
- Radhapura - Endstation der Verdammten (1968) - Alfredo
- Rita of the West (1968) - Silly Bull
- Trusting Is Good... Shooting Is Better (1968) - Roy Fulton
- Cry of Death (1968) - Donkey / Morgan Pitt
- Seven Times Seven (1968) - Big Ben
- Hour X Suicide Patrol (1969) - Sgt. Orwell Smith
- Fellini Satyricon (1969) - Robber
- Sartana the Gravedigger (1969) - Deguejo
- Lisa dagli occhi blu (1969) - Football player
- The Arizona Kid (1970) - Coyote
- Django and Sartana Are Coming... It's the End (1970) - Black Burt Keller / Burt Kelly
- Dead Men Don't Make Shadows (1970) - Roger Murdock
- Io non spezzo... rompo (1971) - Joe il Rosso
- Tre nel mille (1971)
- Se t'incontro t'ammazzo (1971) - Chris Forest
- A Barrel Full of Dollars (1971) - John
- Giù le mani... carogna! (Django Story) (1971) - Buck Bradley
- Let's Go and Kill Sartana (1971) - Greg "The Crazy Person"
- Drummer of Vengeance (1971) - Deputy Norton
- Le Saut de l'ange (1971) - Henry Di Fusco
- Il suo nome era Pot (1971) - Ray Potter
- A Fistful of Death (1971) - Ironhead Donovan / Testa di Ferro
- Savage Guns (1971) - Gordon Mitchell (uncredited)
- Un uomo chiamato Dakota (1972) - Dakota
- The Big Bust Out (1972) - El Kadir
- Magnificent West (1972) - Martin
- Casa d'appuntamento (1972) - Man in Nightclub (uncredited)
- Go Away! Trinity Has Arrived in Eldorado (1972) - Jonathan Duke
- Frankenstein 80 (1972) - Dr. Otto Frankenstein
- Situation (1972) - Gordon
- Allegri becchini… arriva Trinità (1972) - Marvin
- Anything for a Friend (1973) - Miller
- Quando i califfi avevano le corna... (1973) - Caliph married to the Queen
- My Darling Slave (1973) - Von Thirac
- Once Upon a Time in the Wild, Wild West (1973) - Mike
- Pan (1973)
- Dagli archivi della polizia criminale (1973) - Peter Wilcox
- My Name Is Shanghai Joe (1973) - Burying Sam
- Frankenstein's Castle of Freaks (1974) - Igor
- Una donna per 7 bastardi (1974) - Gordon
- The Godfather Squad (1974) - Son of Carrol
- Il domestico (1974) - General Von Werner
- Dört hergele (1974) - Margherito
- Anasinin Gozu (1974)
- Yankesici (1975)
- Seven Devils on Horseback (1975) - Cooper
- La pelle sotto gli artigli (1975) - Professor Helmut
- Due Magnum .38 per una città di carogne (1975) - Renato Proietti
- Tiger from River Kwai (1975) - Jack Mason
- Le Ricain (1975) - Mike
- La polizia ordina: sparate a vista (1976) - David
- L'unica legge in cui credo (1976) - Geo (uncredited)
- Kaput Lager - Gli ultimi giorni delle SS (1977) - Kommandant von Stolzen
- Oil! (1977) - Burt
- Natascha - Todesgrüße aus Moskau (1977) - Gooming
- Gli uccisori (1977) - Pablo
- Zanna Bianca e il grande Kid (1977) - Morgan
- Pugni, dollari e spinaci (1978) - Frank Stilo
- Ishyri dosi... sex (1978)
- A Very Special Woman (1979) - Gordon
- Strategia per una missione di morte (1979) - Paul
- Dr. Jekyll Likes Them Hot (1979) - Pretorius
- Porno erotico western (1979)
- I mavri Emmanouella (1980) - Robert / Factory manager
- Holocaust parte seconda: i ricordi, i deliri, la vendetta (1980) - Felix Oppenheimer
- The Umbrella Coup (1980) - Moskovitz, le tueur
- The Iron Hand of the Mafia (1980) - Don Nicola
- Febbre a 40! (1980) - Sandy's Husband
- Trois filles dans le vent (1981) - Gordon Mitchell
- Inchon (1981) - GHQ Officer (uncredited)
- Nightfall (1981) - Maserati
- La dottoressa preferisce i marinai (1981) - The killer
- Vai avanti tu che mi vien da ridere (1981) - Il killer
- Kirmizi kelebek (1982) - Brado
- Rush (1983) - Yor
- Endgame (1983) - Col. Morgan
- Se tutto va bene siamo rovinati (1983) - Jack Volpetti
- She (1984) - Hector
- Treasure of the Lost Desert (1984) - Dealer
- Diamond Connection (1984) - Harry / Abdul Pasha
- Ricordi (1984)
- White Fire (1985) - Olaf
- Operation Nam (1986) - Col. Mortimer
- The Mines of Kilimanjaro (1986) - Rolf
- Three Men on Fire (1986)
- Commando Invasion (1986) - General MacMoreland
- Evil Spawn (1987) - Dan Thorn
- SFX Retaliator (1987) - Morgan
- Overdose (1987) - Costa
- Cross of the Seven Jewels (1987) - Black Mass Leader
- Faida (1988) - Prete
- La tempesta (1988)
- Blood Delirium (N/A) - Hermann
- Bikini Drive-In (1995) - Goliath
- An Enraged New World (2002) - Gen. Murchison
- Malevolence (2004) - Capo Fabrizio De Martino
- Die to Live - Das Musikill (2004) - Himself (final film role)
