= Il pistolero segnato da Dio =

1968 film

Il pistolero segnato da dio
- Directed by: Giorgio Ferroni
- Screenplay by: Augusto Finocchi; Remigio Del Grosso
- Story by: Augusto Finocchi; Giorgio Ferroni
- Starring: Anthony Steffen; Richard Stapley; Luisa Baratto; Giovanni Cianfriglia
- Cinematography: Sandro Mancori
- Edited by: Giorgio Ferroni
- Music by: Carlo Rustichelli
- Production company: G.V. Cinematografica
- Release date: 29 February 1968 (Italy)
- Country: Italy
- Language: Italian

Il pistolero segnato da Dio (transl. A Gunfighter Sent by God) is a 1968 Italian Spaghetti Western film directed by Giorgio Ferroni and starring Anthony Steffen.

== Cast ==
- Anthony Steffen as Roy Kerry
- Richard Wyler as Coleman
- Ken Wood as Owl Roy
- Liz Barret as Maggie
- Andrea Bosic as Jonathan Murphy
- Tom Felleghy as Bludy
- Gia Sandri as Dora
- Ennio Balbo as Thomas Claridge
- Rina Franchetti as Miss Claridge
- Nello Pazzafini
- Benito Stefanelli

== Production ==
Ferroni directed Il pistolero segnato da dio under the name he used for Westerns, Calvin Jackson Padget. It was filmed at Elios Studios and on location in Rome. Richard Stapley spoke about the film, stating that his agents told him Ferroni was a "first-class director", whom he would "have a great time working with him." Stapley recalled that he was furious with the director, as he was cast as "the baddie, which was not the most important part. I had never played a baddie before, but he told me that I would enjoy it, it's always more fun to play the villain." Stapley described the film a having a moderate budget and a considerably longer shooting schedule, recalling that it lasted over six weeks.

In a 1996 interview with journalist Robert Monell, Stapley revealed that Mario Bava partially worked as a cinematographer on Il pistolero segnato da dio, although Sandro Mancori is credited as the film's sole director of photography. Mancori had worked with Bava anonymously on earlier productions.

== Release ==
Il pistolero segnato da dio was released on February 29, 1968, where it was distributed to Augustus. The film was later re-issued in Italy as Due pistole e un vigliacco.
