= Primo Zeglio =

Italian film director and writer

- Born: 8 July 1906; Buronzo, Italy
- Died: 30 October 1984 (aged 78); Rome, Italy
- Occupation: Director

Primo Zeglio (8 July 1906 – 30 October 1984) was an Italian film director and writer.

== Selected filmography ==
- The Mask of Cesare Borgia (1941)
- It Happened in Damascus (1943)
- Fever (1943)
- Genoveffa di Brabante (1947)
- Nerone e Messalina (1949)
- Revenge of the Pirates (1951)
- La figlia del diavolo (1952)
- Captain Phantom (1953)
- Dimentica il mio passato (1956)
- The Son of the Red Corsair (1959)
- Morgan, the Pirate (1960)
- The Seven Revenges (1961)
- Seven Seas to Calais (1962)
- Slave Queen of Babylon (1962)
- I am Semiramis (1963)
- Texas Ranger (1964)
- The Relentless Four (1965)
- Killer Adios (1967)
- Mission Stardust (1967)
