= The Tartars =

1961 film by Ferdinando Baldi, Richard Thorpe

- Original film poster
- Directed by: Richard Thorpe
- Written by: Domenico Salvati; Sabatino Ciuffini; Oreste Palella; Gaio Frattini; Ambrogio Molteni; Julian De Kassel
- Produced by: Riccardo Gualino
- Starring: Victor Mature; Orson Welles
- Cinematography: Amerigo Gengarelli
- Edited by: Maurizio Lucidi
- Music by: Renzo Rossellini
- Production company: Lux Film
- Distributed by: MGM
- Release date: 20 June 1962
- Running time: 83 min
- Countries: Italy; Yugoslavia
- Language: English
- Box office: $1.1 million (US/Canada)

The Tartars/I Tartari is a 1961 Italian-Yugoslavian epic historical Technicolor film directed by Richard Thorpe and starring Victor Mature and Orson Welles. It is one of the sword-and-sandal genre films made in Italy in the 1950s and early 1960s.

== Plot ==
In Middle Ages in Russia a settlement of Vikings lives in peace with both the Tatars and the Slavs. All is well until Togrul a Tatar chief seeks the help of Oleg, the Viking chieftrain, to war on the Slavs in a surprise attack. Oleg refuses and the group does battle ending with Oleg killing Togrul and abducting Togrul's daughter Samia as a hostage.

Togrul's brother Burundai is furious and wishes the Viking settlement burnt to the ground. "I am your Khan", he says to his troops. His high priest, Ciu Lang, reminds Burundai that Samia is promised to the leader of the Tatars as his wife; her safety and return has a higher priority than Burundai's revenge. Burundai gets his chance to retrieve Samia when a Viking longship is attacked, resulting in the capture of Oleg's wife Helga and her handmaidens even kill the ship's captain viking Sven. Burundai initially promises to treat Helga well as an exchange for Samia but tortures Helga's handmaidens to discover the strength of the Vikings. He also rapes Helga and gives her to his men for their further pleasure prior to exchanging her for Samia. Meanwhile, Samia has fallen in love with Oleg's brother Eric.

When Oleg comes to make the exchange and Ciu Lang leads Helga out to the battlements of the Tatar fortress, she leaps down upon seeing Oleg below and is fatally injured. He takes her and Samia back to the Viking settlement, where Helga asks him to kiss her and dies. The grief-stricken Oleg is ready to kill Samia, but Eric reveals that she is pregnant by him and demands to marry her. Oleg has them tried for their lives by the tribal elders. Meanwhile, Ciu Lang counsels Burundai to get Samia back peacefully, but he has megalomaniac dreams of conquering the whole West, and he kills the priest and goes to lead the Tatars to wipe out the Vikings.

following the death of his beloved wife Helga, Oleg asks Sigrun one of his warrior servants to tell the others that they protecting the village from the Tartar army. At the trial of Eric and Samia, the elders split their votes evenly between acquittal and death, leaving Oleg to cast the deciding vote. Just as he is about to, word comes that Burundai is attacking. He tells Eric to earn the second chance this gives him, organizes the women and children to flee to the Vikings in the mountains, and he and Eric lead the defense of the settlement by the men. The Tatars outnumber them and overwhelm the defenses; Oleg tells Eric to take Samia and go, and Eric rescues her from Tatar soldiers and gets her to a longship. Even Sigrun dies in battle bleeding on the forehead Oleg fights Burundai, throws him into the water and drowns him; as he is saluting Eric and Samia on board their ship, a Tartar spear strikes him and kills Oleg. The longship moves off as the settlement burns.

== Cast ==
- Victor Mature as Oleg: The viking chieftrain, A noble warrior leader of the viking settlement and who attempts to maintain peace but is forced into conflict against the Tartar army,as the film's protagonist
- Orson Welles as Burundai: The new king and noble leader of Tartar army, A ruthless Tartar warrior who assumes control as a Khan and seeks fierce revenge against the Vikings after the death of his brother Torgul.
- Liana Orfei as Helga: Oleg's wife and one for the viking maidens who is captured and held hostage by the Tartar forces.
- Arnoldo Foà as Ciu Lang:
- Luciano Marin as Eric
- Bella Cortez as Samia
- Furio Meniconi as Sigrun
- Folco Lulli as Togrul

== Production ==
Filming took place in Rome and Yugoslavia in October 1960. It was filmed using Italian Totalscope anamorphic lenses.

According to Orson Welles, the extended sword fight between Welles and Mature "on which I worked day after day" was shot with no input from Mature.

== Release ==
MGM issued the film on a double bill with Ride the High Country with The Tartars on the top of the bill.

== Reception ==
=== Box office ===
Orson Welles told Peter Bogdanovich the film "made a lot of money – it got back its cost in New York alone... a perfectly legible drive in kind of movie."

According to MGM records the film made a profit of $34,000.

=== Critical ===
Variety called it an "unsatisfactory exploitation meller".

Orson Welles' enunciation has been praised while Victor Mature has been considered a miscast for not having the looks of an archetypal Viking. Critic Leonard Maltin calls the film "a routine spectacle", giving it 2 stars out of four.

== Biography ==
- Hughes, Howard (2011). Cinema Italiano – The Complete Guide From Classics To Cult. London – New York: I.B.Tauris. ISBN 978-1-84885-608-0.
