= Milla Sannoner =

Italian actress (1938–2003)

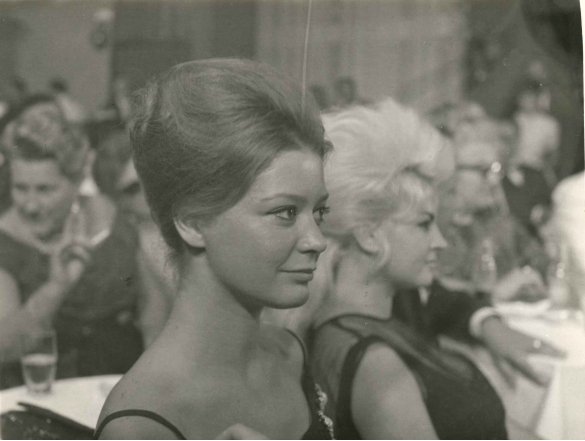
- Born: 29 July 1938; Pesaro, Marche, Kingdom of Italy
- Died: 14 April 2003 (aged 64); Milan, Lombardy, Italy
- Occupation: Actress
- Years active: 1961-1998 (film & TV)

Milla Sannoner (1938–2003) was an Italian film and television actress.

== Filmography ==
Year	Title	Role	Notes
1962	La leggenda di Fra Diavolo	fidanzata di Sebastiano	
1962	The Changing of the Guard	Aurora Vinicio	
1964	Grand Canyon Massacre	Nancy	
1965	La Celestina P... R...	Loredana	
1966	Three Graves for a Winchester	Jane Walcom	
1968	Revenge	Herta	
1969	A Man for Emmanuelle	Ginette	
1970	A Pocketful of Chestnuts	Giovanna	
1976	Sandokan	Lucy Mallory	TV Series, 3 episodes
1981	Madly in Love	Betsy, la consorte di Gustavo VI	
1984	College	Direttrice	
1988	Mia moglie è una bestia	Titolare della pellicceria	
1998	Of Lost Love	Magda, Liliana's mother	(final film role)

== Bibliography ==
- Pitts, Michael R. Western Movies: A Guide to 5,105 Feature Films. McFarland, 2012.
