= The Seven Revenges =

- Directed by: Primo Zeglio
- Written by: Sabatino Ciuffini; Sergio Leone; Roberto Natale; Emminio Salvi; Giuseppe Taffarel; Primo Zeglio
- Cinematography: Bitto Albertini
- Edited by: Franco Fraticelli
- Music by: Carlo Innocenzi
- Release date: 1 April 1961
- Country: Italy
- Language: Italian

The Seven Revenges (Italian: Le sette sfide, also known as Ivan the Conqueror) is a 1961 Italian adventure film directed by Primo Zeglio. It features American actress Elaine Stewart and was filmed in Yugoslavia.

== Plot ==
The leaders of Circassians and Kyrgyz face off in a tournament divided into seven challenges: only one will gain the supremacy.

== Cast ==
- Ed Fury: Ivan
- Elaine Stewart: Tamara
- Bella Cortez: Suani
- Roldano Lupi: Great Khan
- Paola Barbara: Deniza
- Furio Meniconi: Amok
- Gabriele Antonini: Kir
- Sergio Ukmar: Yakub
- Franco Ukmar: Ostop

== Reception ==
Writing in Rivista del Cinematografo in July 1961, G. Ciaccio praised the ingenuity of the opening duels but found the revenge story that followed conventional.
