= Umberto Scarpelli =

Italian screenwriter and film director (1904–1980)

- Born: 25 May 1904; Orvieto, Italy
- Died: 15 May 1980 (aged 75); Rome, Italy
- Occupation: Film director
- Years active: 1933–1951

Umberto Scarpelli (25 May 1904 – 15 May 1980) was an Italian screenwriter and film director. He was assistant director on more than fifteen films and directed five films.

== Selected filmography ==
Year	Title	Role	Notes
1961	The Giant of Metropolis		
1952	Gli uomini non guardano il cielo		
