= List of Italian films of 1942 =

A list of films produced in Italy under Fascist rule in 1942 (see 1942 in film):

== A-L ==
Title	Director	Cast	Genre	Notes
A che servono questi quattrini?	Esodo Pratelli	Eduardo De Filippo, Peppino De Filippo, Clelia Matania	Comedy	
After Casanova's Fashion	Carlo Ludovico Bragaglia	Eduardo De Filippo, Peppino De Filippo, Clelia Matania	Comedy	
Alone at Last	Giacomo Gentilomo	Enrico Viarisio, María Mercader, Anna Magnani	Comedy	
Before the Postman	Mario Bonnard	Aldo Fabrizi, Andrea Checchi, Adriana Benetti	Comedy	
Bengasi	Augusto Genina	Fosco Giachetti, Amedeo Nazzari, Maria von Tasnady	War	
Black Gold	Enrico Guazzoni, Camillo Mastrocinque	Juan de Landa, Carla Candiani, Piero Pastore	Drama	
The Black Panther	Domenico Gambino	Leda Gloria, Dria Paola, Lauro Gazzolo	Crime	
Captain Tempest	Corrado D'Errico	Doris Duranti, Dina Sassoli, Carlo Ninchi	Adventure	
The Countess of Castiglione	Flavio Calzavara	Doris Duranti, Andrea Checchi	Historical	
Disturbance	Guido Brignone	Renzo Ricci, Mariella Lotti, Luisella Beghi	Drama	
Document Z-3	Alfredo Guarini	Isa Miranda, Claudio Gora, Luis Hurtado	Spy	
Don Cesare di Bazan	Riccardo Freda	Gino Cervi, Anneliese Uhlig, Paolo Stoppa	Historical adventure	
Fedora	Camillo Mastrocinque	Luisa Ferida, Amedeo Nazzari, Osvaldo Valenti	Historical	
Forbidden Music	Carlo Campogalliani	Tito Gobbi, María Mercader, Giuseppe Rinaldi	Drama	
Four Steps in the Clouds	Alessandro Blasetti	Gino Cervi, Adriana Benetti, Carlo Romano	Drama	Remade several times, for example A Walk in the Clouds; Close to Italian neorealism
Fourth Page	Nicola Manzari	Claudio Gora, Valentina Cortese, Paola Barbara	Mystery	
A Garibaldian in the Convent	Vittorio De Sica	Leonardo Cortese, María Mercader, Carla Del Poggio	Comedy	
Giarabub	Goffredo Alessandrini	Carlo Ninchi, Doris Duranti, Mario Ferrari, Annibale Betrone	War	Propaganda film about the Italian defense of Fort Giarabub in Libya during World War II
Girl of the Golden West	Carl Koch	Michel Simon, Isa Pola, Valentina Cortese	Western	
The Gorgon	Guido Brignone	Mariella Lotti, Rossano Brazzi, Camillo Pilotto	Historical	
Happy Days	Gianni Franciolini	Lilia Silvi, Amedeo Nazzari, Valentina Cortese	Comedy	
Headlights in the Fog	Gianni Franciolini	Fosco Giachetti, Luisa Ferida, Mariella Lotti	Drama	
The Little Teacher	Giorgio Bianchi	Maria Denis, Nino Besozzi, Elvira Betrone	Comedy	

== M-Z ==
Title	Director	Cast	Genre	Notes
Malombra	Mario Soldati	Isa Miranda, Andrea Checchi, Irasema Dilián	Drama	Calligraphic movement film
Nothing New Tonight	Mario Mattoli	Alida Valli, Carlo Ninchi, Antonio Gandusio	Drama	
I Live as I Please	Mario Mattoli	Ferruccio Tagliavini, Silvana Jachino, Luigi Almirante	Comedy	
Invisible Chains	Mario Mattoli	Alida Valli, Carlo Ninchi, Giuditta Rissone	Drama	
The Lady Is Fickle	Mario Mattoli	Ferruccio Tagliavini, Fioretta Dolfi, Carlo Campanini	Comedy	
The Lion of Damascus	Corrado D'Errico, Enrico Guazzoni	Carla Candiani, Doris Duranti, Carlo Ninchi	Adventure	
Love Story	Mario Camerini	Assia Noris, Piero Lulli	Drama	
Luisa Sanfelice	Leo Menardi	Laura Solari, Massimo Serato	Historical	
Un garibaldino al convento	Vittorio De Sica	Leonardo Cortese, María Mercader	Drama	
The Jester's Supper	Alessandro Blasetti	Amedeo Nazzari, Osvaldo Valenti	Historical	
Odessa in Flames	Carmine Gallone	Maria Cebotari, Carlo Ninchi, Filippo Scelzo	War	Co-production with Romania
Once a Week	Ákos Ráthonyi	Roberto Villa, Vera Carmi, Titina De Filippo	Comedy	
A Pilot Returns	Roberto Rossellini	Massimo Girotti, Michela Belmonte	War	
A Pistol Shot	Renato Castellani	Assia Noris, Fosco Giachetti	Historical drama	
The Princess of Dreams	Roberto Savarese	Irasema Dilián, Antonio Centa, Maria Melato	Romance	
Rossini	Mario Bonnard	Nino Besozzi, Paola Barbara, Camillo Pilotto	Historical	
The Queen of Navarre	Carmine Gallone	Elsa Merlini, Gino Cervi	Historical	
Sealed Lips	Mario Mattoli	Fosco Giachetti, Annette Bach, Andrea Checchi	Mystery	
Signorinette	Luigi Zampa	Carla Del Poggio, Paola Veneroni, Roberto Villa	Drama	
La signorina	Ladislao Kish	Loredana, Nino Besozzi	Romance	
Sleeping Beauty	Luigi Chiarini	Luisa Ferida, Amedeo Nazzari	Comedy	
Souls in Turmoil	Giulio Del Torre	Gina Falckenberg, Carlo Tamberlani, Leda Gloria	Drama	
Street of the Five Moons	Luigi Chiarini	Luisella Beghi, Olga Solbelli	Romance	
The Taming of the Shrew	Ferdinando Maria Poggioli	Amedeo Nazzari, Lilia Silvi, Lauro Gazzolo	Comedy	
The Three Pilots	Mario Mattoli	Michela Belmonte, Leonardo Cortese, Alberto Sordi	War drama	
Torrents of Spring	Nunzio Malasomma	Gino Cervi, Mariella Lotti, Vanna Vanni	Drama	
Tragic Night	Mario Soldati	Doris Duranti, Carlo Ninchi, Andrea Checchi	Drama	
The Two Orphans	Carmine Gallone	Alida Valli, María Denis	Drama	
Violets in Their Hair	Carlo Ludovico Bragaglia	Lilia Silvi, Irasema Dilián, Carla Del Poggio	Comedy drama	
We the Living	Goffredo Alessandrini	Alida Valli, Fosco Giachetti, Rossano Brazzi	Drama	Adaptation of Ayn Rand's anticommunist novel We the Living
Addio, Kira	Goffredo Alessandrini	Alida Valli, Fosco Giachetti, Rossano Brazzi	Drama	The second part of We the Living
Wedding Day	Raffaello Matarazzo	Anna Proclemer, Roberto Villa	Comedy	
The Woman of Sin	Harry Hasso	Viveca Lindfors, Otello Toso, Gustav Diessl	Drama	
Yellow Hell	Géza von Radványi	Fosco Giachetti, Maria De Tasnady	Drama	
