= Under the Southern Cross (1938 film) =

- Directed by: Guido Brignone
- Written by: Luigi Chiarelli; Arrigo Colombo; Jacopo Comin; Marisa Romano
- Produced by: Giorgio Carini
- Starring: Antonio Centa; Doris Duranti; Enrico Glori; Giovanni Grasso
- Cinematography: Arturo Gallea; Aldo Tonti
- Edited by: Giuseppe Fatigati
- Music by: Renzo Rossellini
- Production company: Mediterranea Film
- Distributed by: CINF
- Release date: October 1938
- Running time: 78 minutes
- Country: Italy
- Language: Italian

Under the Southern Cross (Italian: Sotto la croce del sud) is a 1938 Italian drama film directed by Guido Brignone and starring Antonio Centa, Doris Duranti and Enrico Glori. The film is set in Italian-occupied Abyssinia following the recent Italian victory there. It was one of a sequence of eight films set in Italy's African Empire during the Fascist era that were released between 1936 and 1939. The film is a propaganda piece designed to support Fascist policy on empire and concerns about inter-racial romances.

It was shot at the Tirrenia Studios in Tuscany and on location in the Galla Territory of Italian Ethiopia.

== Synopsis ==
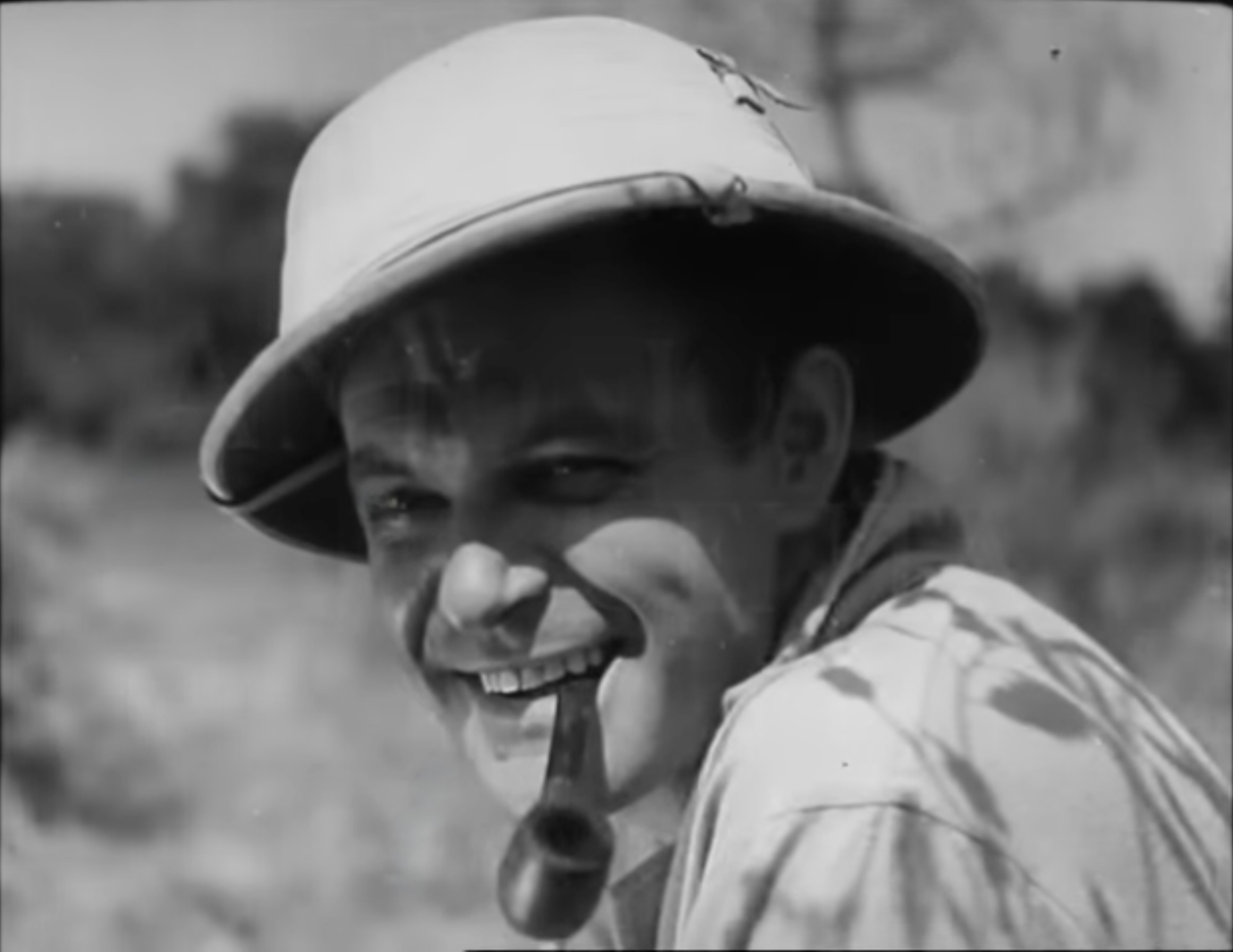
Antonio Centa

Marco the owner of a coffee plantation in Abyssinia, is trying to play his part in building the new Italian Empire. He becomes concerned however that his Italian staff, in the absence of their wives and families, are becoming overly attracted to native woman. His junior partner Paolo has to resist the allures of Mailù, an attractive young Middle Eastern woman.

== Main cast ==
- Antonio Centa as Paolo
- Doris Duranti as Mailù
- Enrico Glori as Simone
- Giovanni Grasso as Marco, il capo della piantagione
- Salvatore Cuffaro as Pisani
- Carlo Duse as Donati
- Fausto Guerzoni as Coppola
- Enrico Marroni as Todini
- Felice Minotti as Riva
- Piero Pastore as Casale

== Bibliography ==
- Forgacs, David. Italy's Margins: Social Exclusion and Nation Formation since 1861. Cambridge University Press, 2014.
- Palumbo, Patrizia. A Place in the Sun: Africa in Italian Colonial Culture from Post-unification to the Present. University of California Press, 2003.
- Reich, Jacqueline & Garofalo, Piero. Re-viewing Fascism: Italian Cinema, 1922-1943. Indiana University Press, 2002.
