= Augusto Marcacci =

Italian actor (1892–1969)

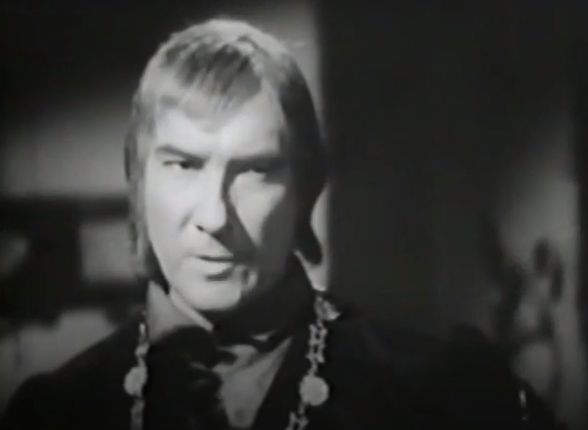
- Marcacci in The Mask of Cesare Borgia (1941)
- Born: 4 June 1892; Florence, Italy
- Died: 7 December 1969 (aged 77); Rome, Italy
- Occupations: Actor; voice actor
- Years active: 1922–1969

Augusto Marcacci (4 June 1892 – 7 December 1969) was an Italian actor and voice actor.

== Biography ==
After completing his studies in Law, Gualtiero De Angelis felt a calling for the stage. After passing an audition, he debuted as an "amoroso" (romantic lead) in the Benelliana theater company. Gifted with a beautiful, persuasive voice and the physical appearance of a young lead, he joined several primary companies, including those of Luigi Carini-Olga Vittoria Gentilli-Aristide Baghetti and Virgilio Talli-Annibale Betrone-Maria Melato.

Around 1922, he performed alongside Maria Melato, later joining Alda Borelli, and eventually the companies of Dina Galli and Enrico Viarisio. During these years, he was noted for his dry, elegant, and measured acting style. While sometimes appearing cold or aloof due to his restrained delivery, he was highly effective in roles such as the "haughty Prince Metternich" in Edmond Rostand's L'Aiglon. Until the outbreak of World War II, he remained one of the most sought-after actors in prose theater.

== Selected filmography ==
- Dimmed Lights (1934)
- Lady of Paradise (1934)
- Golden Arrow (1935)
- Condottieri (1937)
- The Cuckoo Clock (1938)
- Beyond Love (1940)
- Eternal Melodies (1940)
- The First Woman Who Passes (1940)
- First Love (1941)
- The Mask of Cesare Borgia (1941)
- Girl of the Golden West (1942)
- Love Story (1942)
- Invisible Chains (1942)
- Fedora (1942)
- A Little Wife (1943)
- Rita of Cascia (1943)

== Bibliography ==
- Mancini, Elaine. Struggles of the Italian film industry during fascism, 1930-1935. UMI Research Press, 1985.
