= The Castle Ball =

1939 film directed by Max Neufeld

- Directed by: Max Neufeld
- Written by: Oreste Biancoli; Carlo Della Posta
- Produced by: Carlo Della Posta
- Starring: Alida Valli; Antonio Centa; Carlo Lombardi
- Cinematography: Václav Vích
- Edited by: Giuseppe Fatigati
- Music by: Armando Fragna
- Production company: Italcine
- Distributed by: Industrie Cinematografiche Italiane
- Release date: 1 October 1939
- Running time: 95 minutes
- Country: Italy
- Language: Italian

The Castle Ball or Ball at the Castle (Italian: Ballo al castello) is a 1939 Italian "white-telephones" romantic comedy film directed by Max Neufeld and starring Alida Valli, Antonio Centa and Carlo Lombardi.

The film's sets were designed by the art director Ottavio Scotti.

== Cast ==
- Alida Valli as Greta Larsen
- Antonio Centa as Tenente Paolo Karinsky
- Carlo Lombardi as Giorgio
- Sandra Ravel as Rita Valenti
- Giuseppe Pierozzi as Ballet Master Petrovich
- Corrado De Cenzo as Nicola
- Vasco Creti as Sebastiano Larsen
- Guido Notari as Director of the Theatre

== Bibliography ==
- Nowell-Smith, Geoffrey & Hay, James & Volpi, Gianni. The Companion to Italian Cinema. Cassell, 1996.
