= Giuseppe Pierozzi =

Italian stage and film actor

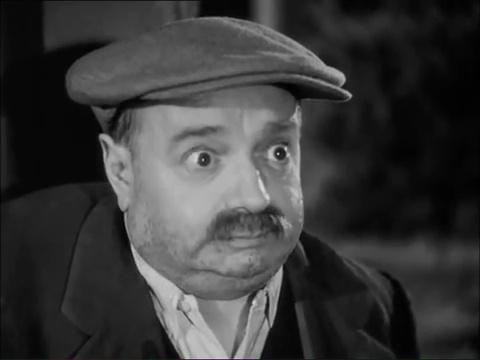
- Pierozzi in In High Places (1943)
- Born: 11 October 1883; Rome, Lazio, Italy
- Died: 22 April 1956 (aged 72); Rome, Lazio, Italy
- Occupation: Actor
- Years active: 1917–1952 (film)

Giuseppe Pierozzi (11 October 1883 – 22 April 1956) was an Italian stage and film actor.

== Selected filmography ==
- Maddalena Ferat (1920)
- Through the Shadows (1923)
- Samson (1923)
- The Faces of Love (1924)
- The Fiery Cavalcade (1925)
- Girls Do Not Joke (1929)
- Lowered Sails (1931)
- Before the Jury (1931)
- Resurrection (1931)
- Paradise (1932)
- La Wally (1932)
- Zaganella and the Cavalier (1932)
- The Gift of the Morning (1932)
- Pergolesi (1932)
- Tourist Train (1933)
- Together in the Dark (1933)
- Those Two (1935)
- Adam's Tree (1936)
- Bayonet (1936)
- But It's Nothing Serious (1936)
- To Live (1937)
- The Ferocious Saladin (1937)
- The Former Mattia Pascal (1937)
- The Three Wishes (1937)
- Il signor Max (1937)
- The House of Shame (1938)
- The Cuckoo Clock (1938)
- A Wife in Danger (1939)
- Two Million for a Smile (1939)
- The Dream of Butterfly (1939)
- The Document (1939)
- The Castle Ball (1939)
- The Night of Tricks (1939)
- A Thousand Lire a Month (1939)
- The First Woman Who Passes (1940)
- Two on a Vacation (1940)
- Manon Lescaut (1940)
- The Secret Lover (1941)
- The Hero of Venice (1941)
- In High Places (1943)
- Short Circuit (1943)
- Sad Loves (1943)
- A Little Wife (1943)
- The Priest's Hat (1944)
- My Widow and I (1945)
- The Innocent Casimiro (1945)
- Down with Misery (1945)
- I'll Sing No More (1945)
- Peddlin' in Society (1946)
- Bullet for Stefano (1947)
- Fatal Symphony (1947)
- The Captain's Daughter (1947)
- Mad About Opera (1948)
- A Night of Fame (1949)
- Miss Italia (1950)
- Song of Spring (1951)
- When in Rome (1952)

== Bibliography ==
- Goble, Alan. The Complete Index to Literary Sources in Film. Walter de Gruyter, 1999.
