= In High Places (1943 film) =

1943 Italian comedy film directed by Mario Soldati

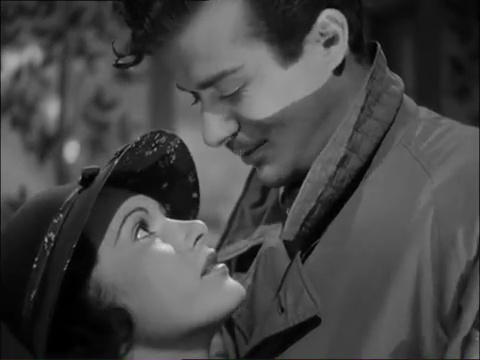
- Adriana Benetti and Massimo Serato in a scene from the film
- Directed by: Mario Soldati
- Written by: Jean Anouilh (play); Mario Bonfantini; Renato Castellani; Steno; Ercole Patti; Mario Soldati
- Starring: Adriana Benetti; Massimo Serato; Nerio Bernardi; Enzo Biliotti
- Cinematography: Otello Martelli; Aldo Tonti
- Edited by: Gisa Radicchi Levi
- Music by: Giuseppe Rosati
- Production company: ICI
- Distributed by: ICI
- Release date: 1943
- Running time: 82 minutes
- Country: Italy
- Language: Italian

In High Places (Italian:Quartieri alti) is a 1943 Italian comedy film directed by Mario Soldati and starring Adriana Benetti, Massimo Serato and Nerio Bernardi. It is based on a play by Jean Anouilh, Le Rendez-vous de Senlis, but also on the novel of the same name (Quartieri alti) by Ercole Patti. The film portrays the rise into high society of an immoral young man. It belongs to the movies of the calligrafismo style.

== Cast ==
- Adriana Benetti as Isabella
- Massimo Serato as Giorgio Zanetti
- Nerio Bernardi as Emilio Buscaglione
- Enzo Biliotti as Febo Marcantoni
- Natalia Ray as Edmea
- Jucci Kellerman as Barbara
- Fanny Marchiò as Donna Lina Rigotti
- Maria Melato as Maria Letizia Bruneschi
- Gina Sammarco as La falsa madre di Giorgio
- Giulio Stival as Il falso padre di Giorgio
- Piero Pastore as Bottarini, il calciatore
- Giuseppe Pierozzi as Il tabaccaio gobbo
- Vittorio Sanipoli as Roberto
- Alfredo Del Pelo as Il chitarrista all1 taverna "Ulpia"
- Gilda Marchiò as L'affituaria della villa
- Marco Monari Rocca as Il conte Giandomenico

== Bibliography ==
- Brunetta, Gian Piero. The History of Italian Cinema: A Guide to Italian Film from Its Origins to the Twenty-first Century. Princeton University Press, 2009.
- Landy, Marcia. The Folklore of Consensus: Theatricality in the Italian Cinema, 1930-1943. SUNY Press, 1998.
