= Melato =

Melato is an Italian surname. Notable people with the surname include:

- Anna Melato (born 1952), Italian actress
- Maria Melato (1885–1950), Italian actress
- Mariangela Melato (1941–2013), Italian actress, sister of Anna
