= Enzo Biliotti =

Italian actor (1887–1976)

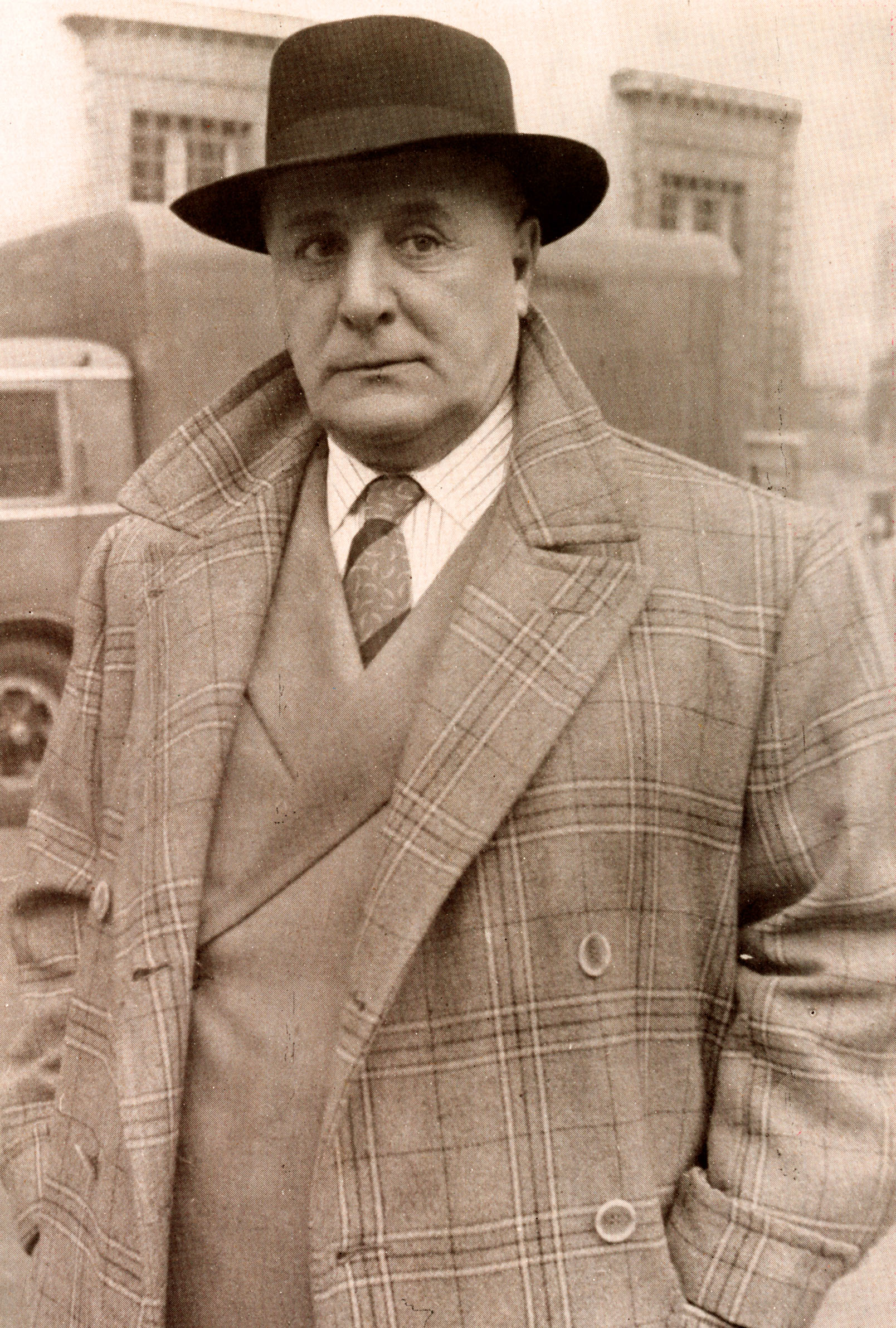
- Biliotti in 1953
- Born: 28 June 1887; Livorno, Kingdom of Italy
- Died: 19 November 1976 (aged 89); Bologna, Italy
- Occupation: Actor
- Years active: 1916–1958

Enzo Biliotti (28 June 1887 – 19 November 1976) was an Italian film actor. He appeared in 80 films between 1916 and 1958.

== Life and career ==
Born in Livorno, Biliotti started his career in 1918, in the stage company of Luigi Carini and Olga Vittoria Gentilli. He made his screen debut in 1922, playing Frà Cristoforo in the silent film The Betrothed. Between 1920s and 1940s he was very active on stage, working, among others, with Alda Borelli, Dina Galli, Lilia Silvi, Gualtiero Tumiati, Gemma Bolognesi and with the Mario Mattoli's stage company Za Bum. In films, following his impersonation of Napoleon III in Villafranca, Biliotti specialized in roles of kings, emperors and noblemen. He retired in the late 1950s.

== Selected filmography ==
- The Betrothed (1923)
- Villafranca (1934)
- Lady of Paradise (1934)
- I Love You Only (1935)
- Bayonet (1936)
- The Ambassador (1936)
- The Two Sergeants (1936)
- Doctor Antonio (1937)
- For Men Only (1938)
- I Want to Live with Letizia (1938)
- Defendant, Stand Up! (1939)
- Backstage (1939)
- Lo vedi come sei... lo vedi come sei? (1939)
- Big Shoes (1940)
- The Pirate's Dream (1940)
- Non me lo dire! (1940)
- Two on a Vacation (1940)
- Piccolo mondo antico (1941)
- Light in the Darkness (1941)
- The Betrothed (1941)
- Don Cesare di Bazan (1942)
- Violets in Their Hair (1942)
- The Countess of Castiglione (1942)
- Malombra (1942)
- Short Circuit (1943)
- Two Hearts Among the Beasts (1943)
- In High Places (1943)
- The Innocent Casimiro (1945)
- Un giorno nella vita (1946)
- Difficult Years (1948)
- Toto Looks for a House (1949)
- Hawk of the Nile (1950)
- Hearts at Sea (1950)
- The Elusive Twelve (1950)
- That Ghost of My Husband (1950)
- The Knight Has Arrived! (1950)
- I'm the Hero (1952)
- Immortal Melodies (1952)
- Lieutenant Giorgio (1952)
- The Blind Woman of Sorrento (1952)
- Frine, Courtesan of Orient (1953)
- The Daughter of the Regiment (1953)
- Papà Pacifico (1954)
- Mata Hari's Daughter (1954)
