= Fortunella =

Fortunella may refer to:

- Fortunella, a now-historical genus in which kumquats were formerly classified
- Fortunella (film), a 1958 Italian comedy
