= Enrico Glori =

Italian actor (1901–1966)

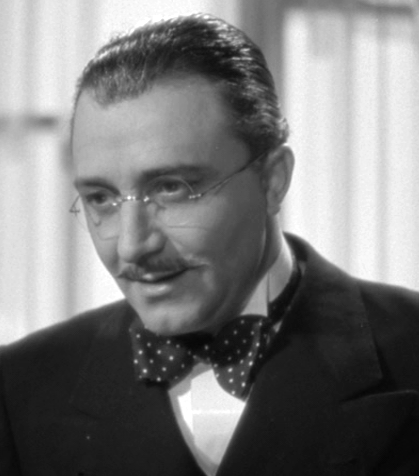
- Glori in Department Store (1939)
- Born: Enrico Musy; 3 August 1901; Naples, Italy
- Died: 22 April 1966 (aged 64); Rome, Italy
- Occupation: Actor
- Years active: 1934–1963
- Spouse: Gianna Pacetti
- Children: Gianni Musy
- Relatives: Mascia Musy (granddaughter); Stella Musy (granddaughter)

Enrico Musy, better known as Enrico Glori (3 August 1901 – 22 April 1966) was an Italian actor.

== Biography ==
Born in Naples to a wealthy family of French origin, Glori became an actor in his thirties. He spent most of his time in France where he eventually made his film debut in the 1934 film Street Without a Name directed by Pierre Chenal. He starred in many other French films for the next three years until he was called back to Italy in 1937 after finishing his work on several films which includes The Former Mattia Pascal.

Glori was often known for his portrayal of villainous, sadistic and treacherous characters in most of his movies through the late 1930s and early 1940s. He appeared in over 126 films between 1934 and 1963, most of which were directed by Raffaello Matarazzo, Vittorio De Sica, Michelangelo Antonioni, Alberto Lattuada and many more. Glori's son Gianni was also an actor.

Glori retired in 1963, and died three years later after suffering from health problems.

== Selected filmography ==
- Street Without a Name (1934) - Cruseo
- Merchant of Love (1935)
- Carnival in Flanders (1935) - (uncredited)
- Parisian Life (1936)
- Anne-Marie (1936) - Un homme d'affaires (uncredited)
- Jenny (1936)
- When Midnight Strikes (1936)
- Compliments of Mister Flow (1936) - L'interprète (uncredited)
- Beethoven's Great Love (1936)
- The Man from Nowhere (1937) - Le coiffeur
- Un homme à abattre (1937)
- The Former Mattia Pascal (1937) - Il conte Papiano
- The Pearls of the Crown (1937) - La camérier du pape (Italian narrator)
- The Red Dancer (1937)
- The Beauty of Montparnasse (1937) - Ernesto
- The Three Wishes (1937) - Ricciardi
- Naples of Olden Times (1938) - Maurizio
- Tonight at Eleven (1938) - Gabry, il gangster
- Trois dans un moulin (1938)
- Princess Tarakanova (1938) - Il mercante / Le marchand
- Heartbeat (1938) - Bodigar Glazunoff
- L'escadrille de la chance (1938) - Carlo
- L'ultima carta (1938) - Lascard
- Giuseppe Verdi (1938) - Il maestro Mariani
- Under the Southern Cross (1938) - Simone
- Il suo destino (1938) - Don Pedro
- La signora di Montecarlo (1938)
- L'inconnue de Monte Carlo (1939)
- Terra di fuoco (1939) - L'impresario
- Diamonds (1939) - Carlo Deremont
- Il barone di Corbò (1939) - Il barone di Corbò
- Department Store (1939) - Bertini, il capo del personale
- Cardinal Messias (1939) - Il re Menelik
- The Fornaretto of Venice (1939) - Lorenzo Loredano
- È sbarcato un marinaio (1940) - Gomez
- La gerla di papà Martin (1940) - L'usuraio Charenzon
- Abandonment (1940) - Il marito di Maria
- L'arcidiavolo (1940) - Maurizio
- The Daughter of the Green Pirate (1940) - El Rojo
- The Prisoner of Santa Cruz (1941) - Luigi Bolli
- The Mask of Cesare Borgia (1941) - Sinistro dei Falchi
- The Betrothed (1941) - Don Rodrigo
- L'uomo venuto dal mare (1942) - Il ricattatore
- The Two Orphans (1942) - Il marchese di Presle
- Don Cesare di Bazan (1942) - Il visconte di Beaumont
- The Little Teacher (1942) - Giacomo Macchia
- Harlem (1943) - Ben Farrell
- Two Hearts Among the Beasts (1943) - Il signor Smith
- 4 ragazze sognano (1943) - Il notaio Robert Morbleton
- Tehran (1946)
- Peddlin' in Society (1946) - Il commissario
- Il mondo vuole così (1946)
- The Opium Den (1947) - Commissario
- L'apocalisse (1947)
- Lost in the Dark (1947) - Paolo Nardone
- The Charterhouse of Parma (1948) - Gilletti, l'acteur de théâtre (uncredited)
- Manù il contrabbandiere (1948) - Claudio Geraudy, il banchiere
- Under the Cards (1948) - Claude Géraudy
- The Street Has Many Dreams (1948) - Il ricettatore (uncredited)
- Il corriere di ferro (1948)
- Monaca santa (1949) - Pasquale Cammarota
- Genoveffa di Brabante (1949) - Goro
- Romanticismo (1949) - Baraffini
- The Emperor of Capri (1949) - Il maggiordomo
- Cintura di castità (1950)
- Side Street Story (1950)
- Strano appuntamento (1950)
- La taverna della libertà (1950)
- The Vow (1950) - Lo sfruttatore
- Song of Spring (1951)
- Revenge of the Pirates (1951) - Governatore Raimondo di Velasco
- Nobody's Children (1951) - Rinaldi
- Repentance (1952)
- Viva il cinema! (1952)
- La voce del sangue (1952)
- Stranger on the Prowl (1952) - Signor Pucci
- At Sword's Edge (1952) - Miguel
- Il romanzo della mia vita (1952) - 'The Amateur Hour' Presenter
- The Lady Without Camelias (1953) - Franco Albonetti
- Terminal Station (1953) - Police Brigadier (uncredited)
- A Husband for Anna (1953) - Il proprietario del cinema
- Legione straniera (1953) - Padre di Irene
- Vortice (1953) - Direttore della prigione
- Mamma perdonami! (1953)
- Verdi, the King of Melody (1953) - Funz. teatro La Fenice (uncredited)
- Finalmente libero! (1953) - Prosecutor
- It Takes Two to Sin in Love (1954)
- Th Beach (1954) - The 'Palace Hotel' 's Director
- Desiderio 'e sole (1954) - Commendator Gaetano Bottoni
- Guai ai vinti (1954) - Secondo viaggiatore (uncredited)
- Loves of Three Queens (1954) - Priamo (segment: The Face That Launched a Thousand Ships)
- Dangerous Turning (1954) - Simoni, le brigadier
- Tears of Love (1954) - Comm. Goebritz
- Spring, Autumn and Love (1955) - Le maître d'hôtel
- Black Dossier (1955) - Vaillant
- Il nostro campione (1955) - Grottaglia
- Beautiful but Dangerous (1955) - (uncredited)
- Io piaccio (1955) - The Nightclub Waiter
- La ladra (1955) - Il Brigadiere
- La grande savana (1955)
- Escape to the Dolomites (1955) - Bepo Ghezzi
- Una sera di maggio (1955)
- Ricordami (1955) - industriale Barra
- Le secret de soeur Angèle (1956) - Le patron du restaurant
- Lo spadaccino misterioso (1956)
- Difendo il mio amore (1956)
- I vagabondi delle stelle (1956) - De Chiara
- Arriva la zia d'America (1956) - Savelli
- Parola di ladro (1957) - Degano
- An Eye for an Eye (1957) - Zardi (uncredited)
- The Love Specialist (1957) - Supporter of the Aquila Contrada (uncredited)
- Fortunella (1958) - Gambler
- Tabarin (1958) - Truffaut
- Adorabili e bugiarde (1958) - Sergeant Donatello
- The Adventures of Nicholas Nickleby (1958, TV series) - Arturo Gride
- Herod the Great (1959) - Taret
- The Employee (1959) - The Office Clerk with a Bow Tie (uncredited)
- Il terrore della maschera rossa (1960)
- La Dolce Vita (1960) - Ammiratore di Nadia
- Il Mattatore (1960)
- The Night They Killed Rasputin (1960)
- From a Roman Balcony (1960)
- Love in Rome (1960) - Curtatoni's Friend in Restaurant
- Constantine and the Cross (1961) - Livia's Father
- Tiro al piccione (1961)
- Vanina Vanini (1961)
- Mole Men Against the Son of Hercules (1961) - Kahab - the High Priest
- Duel of the Titans (1961) - Cittadino di Alba
- Barabbas (1961) - Man Pleading for Release of Prisoner
- Damon and Pythias (1962) - Nikos
- La colt è la mia legge (1965) - Sam
