= The Rival of the Empress =

1951 film

- Directed by: Jacopo Comin; Sidney Salkow
- Written by: Jacques Companéez (story); Doreen Montgomery; Hagar Wilde
- Produced by: Dario Sabatello
- Starring: Richard Greene; Valentina Cortese; Isa Pola
- Cinematography: Tonino Delli Colli; Erwin Hillier
- Edited by: Nino Baragli; Peter Graham Scott
- Music by: Hans May
- Production companies: Scalera Film; Tuscania Film
- Distributed by: Scalera Film
- Release date: 22 February 1951
- Running time: 95 minutes
- Country: Italy
- Language: Italian

The Rival of the Empress (Italian: La rivale dell'imperatrice) is a 1951 Italian historical adventure film directed by Jacopo Comin and Sidney Salkow and starring Richard Greene, Valentina Cortese and Isa Pola. A separate English-language version Shadow of the Eagle was released the previous year.

It was shot at the Scalera Studios in Rome with sets designed by Wilfred Shingleton. The costumes were designed by Vittorio Nino Novarese. Star Richard Greene was dubbed by the Italian actor Massimo Serato.

== Plot ==
During the 18th century, the empress of Russia Catherine the Great sends her lover Count Alexei Orloff to kidnap her rival for the throne, the pretender Elizabeth, Princess Tarakanova, from Venice. However, Orloff ends up falling in love with the princess.

== Cast ==
- Richard Greene as Conte Alexei Orloff
- Valentina Cortese as Principessa Tarakanova
- Greta Gynt as Contessa Loradona Campaniello
- Isa Pola as Imperatrice Catarina
- Charles Goldner as Generale Korsakoff
- Hugh French as Sergente Sergei Nikolsky
- Antonio Centa as Principe Rasiwill
- Guido Notari as Vaska
- Cippi Valli as Cameriera di Elisabetta
- William Tubbs
- Giulio Donnini
- Dino Galvani
- Enzo Musumeci Greco

== See also ==
- Princess Tarakanova (1910)
- Tarakanova (1930)
- Princess Tarakanova (1938)
- Shadow of the Eagle (1950)

== Bibliography ==
- Alberto Anile. Orson Welles in Italy. Indiana University Press, 2013.
