= Emilio Petacci =

Italian actor (1886–1965)

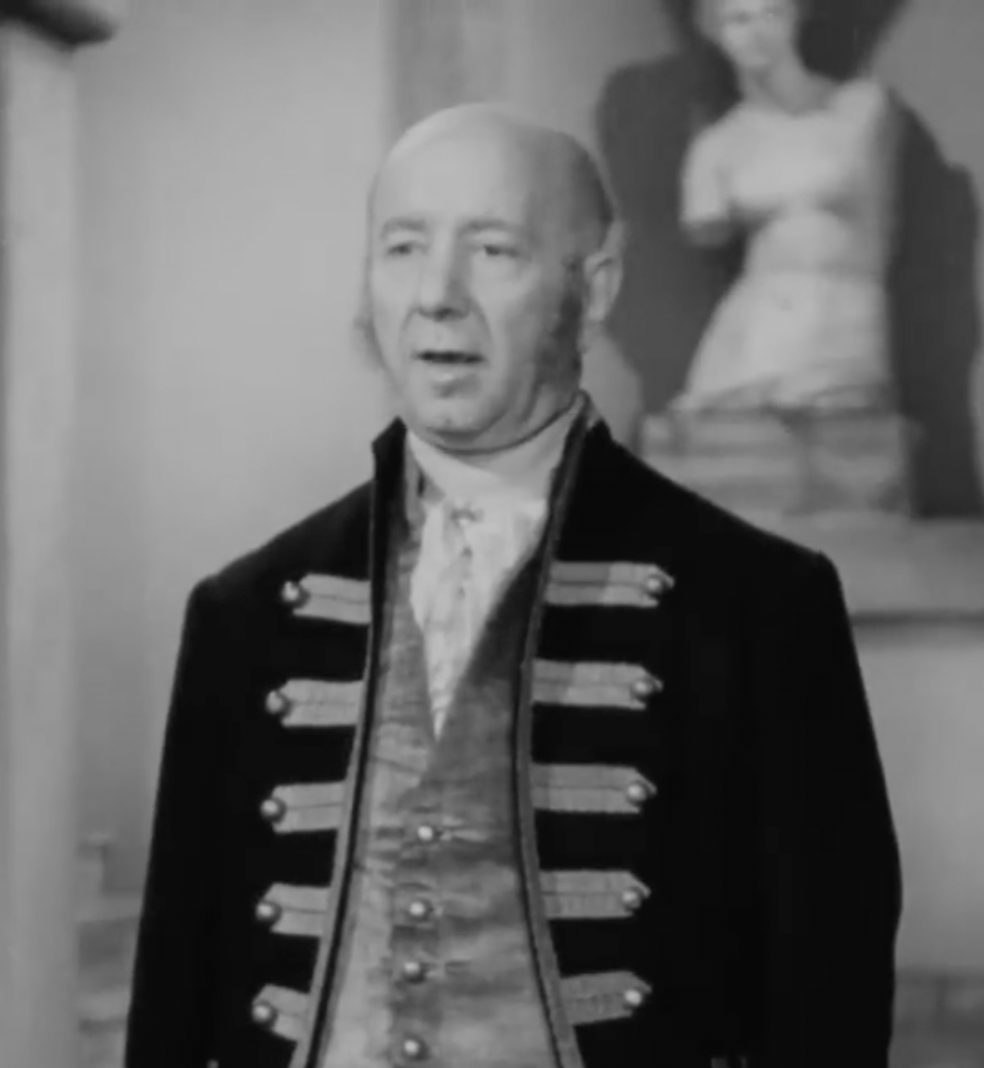
- Petacci in La principessa del sogno (1942)
- Born: 25 January 1886; Rome, Lazio, Italy
- Died: 20 March 1965 (aged 79); Rome, Lazio Italy
- Occupation: Actor
- Years active: 1913–1958 (film)

Emilio Petacci (1886–1965) was an Italian film actor.

== Selected filmography ==
- Love Everlasting (1913)
- The Wedding March (1934)
- The Joker King (1935)
- Sette giorni all'altro mondo (1936)
- Joe the Red (1936)
- The Two Sergeants (1936)
- Tonight at Eleven (1938)
- In the Country Fell a Star (1939)
- It Always Ends That Way (1939)
- Heartbeat (1939)
- Saint John, the Beheaded (1940)
- Antonio Meucci (1940)
- The First Woman Who Passes (1940)
- The Cavalier from Kruja (1940)
- Big Shoes (1940)
- The Prisoner of Santa Cruz (1941)
- The Happy Ghost (1941)
- Beatrice Cenci (1941)
- Blood Wedding (1941)
- The Man on the Street (1941)
- Light in the Darkness (1941)
- The Hero of Venice (1941)
- Honeymoon (1941)
- The Countess of Castiglione (1942)
- The Princess of Dreams (1942)
- Souls in Turmoil (1942)
- The White Angel (1943)
- Anything for a Song (1943)
- Special Correspondents (1943)
- Resurrection (1944)
- L'abito nero da sposa (1945)
- Red Moon (1951)
- La figlia del diavolo (1952)
- Cardinal Lambertini (1954)
- The Miller's Beautiful Wife (1955)
- Beatrice Cenci (1956)

== Bibliography ==
- Goble, Alan. The Complete Index to Literary Sources in Film. Walter de Gruyter, 1999.
