= The Cavalier from Kruja =

1940 film directed by Carlo Campogalliani

- Directed by: Carlo Campogalliani
- Written by: Alberto Grimaudo; Carlo Malatesta; Gian Gaspare Napolitano; Alberto Spaini; Aldo Vergano
- Produced by: Liborio Capitani
- Starring: Doris Duranti; Antonio Centa; Leda Gloria; Guido Celano
- Cinematography: Giorgio Orsini; Aldo Tonti
- Edited by: Mario Bonotti
- Music by: Alberto Ghislanzoni
- Production company: Produzione Capitani Film
- Distributed by: ENIC
- Release date: 5 September 1940
- Running time: 78 minutes
- Country: Italy
- Language: Italian

The Cavalier from Kruja (Italian: Il cavaliere di Kruja) is a 1940 Italian war film directed by Carlo Campogalliani and starring Doris Duranti, Antonio Centa and Leda Gloria. The film portrays the 1939 Italian invasion of Albania. It was made as a propaganda work in support of Benito Mussolini's dictatorship.

== Cast ==
- Antonio Centa as Stafano Andriani
- Doris Duranti as Eliana Haidar
- Leda Gloria as Alidjé
- Guido Celano as Hasslan Haidar
- Nico Pepe as Mario Marini
- Giuseppe Rinaldi as Essad Haidar
- Vasco Creti as Ilias Haidar
- Arnaldo Arnaldi as Mirko
- Oscar Andriani as Il capo della polizia
- Dino Di Luca as Osman
- Carlo Duse as Argiropulos
- Katiuscia Odinzova as Miss Parker
- Emilio Petacci as L'operaio italiano Ferrero
- Walter Lazzaro as Magnani
- Luigi Carini
- Noëlle Norman

== Bibliography ==
- Liehm, Mira. Passion and Defiance: Film in Italy from 1942 to the Present. University of California Press, 1984.
