= Those Two =

- Assia Noris flanked by the De Filippo brothers
- Directed by: Gennaro Righelli
- Written by: Giuseppe Amato; Gennaro Righelli
- Produced by: Giuseppe Amato
- Starring: Eduardo De Filippo; Peppino De Filippo; Assia Noris; Maurizio D'Ancora
- Cinematography: Massimo Terzano
- Edited by: Fernando Tropea
- Music by: Armando Fragna
- Production company: G.A.I.
- Distributed by: Amato Film
- Release date: 1935
- Running time: 75 minutes
- Country: Italy
- Language: Italian

Those Two (Italian: Quei due) is a 1935 Italian comedy film directed by Gennaro Righelli and starring Eduardo De Filippo, Peppino De Filippo and Assia Noris. A couple of men struggling to find work both fall in love with the same woman. The story is loosely based on two works by Eduardo De Filippo.

== Cast ==
- Eduardo De Filippo as Il professore
- Peppino De Filippo as Giacomino
- Assia Noris as Lily
- Maurizio D'Ancora as Mario
- Lamberto Picasso as Gerbi
- Luigi Almirante as Gelsomino
- Franco Coop as Giovanni
- Anna Magnani as Pierotta
- Giuseppe Pierozzi as Un matto della clinica 'Villa Belvedere'

== Bibliography ==
- Moliterno, Gino. Historical Dictionary of Italian Cinema. Scarecrow Press, 2008.
