= Loves of Three Queens =

- Directed by: Marc Allégret; Edgar G. Ulmer
- Written by: Marc Allégret; Hugh Gray; Aeneas MacKenzie; Vittorio Nino Novarese; Roger Vadim; Salka Viertel
- Starring: Hedy Lamarr
- Cinematography: John Allen; Desmond Dickinson; Guglielmo Lombardi; Fernando Risi
- Music by: Nino Rota
- Release date: 1954
- Country: Italy
- Language: Italian

Loves of Three Queens (Italian: L'amante di Paride), also known as The Face That Launched a Thousand Ships, is a 1954 Italian anthology film. It was directed by Marc Allégret and Edgar G. Ulmer and stars Hedy Lamarr. Produced by Victor Pahlen.

== Plot ==
A woman going to a costume party tries to work out which Queen she will dress up as. The film follows scenes from the lives of each of the queens. Genevieve, Josephine, and Helen.

== Cast ==
- Hedy Lamarr as Hedy Windsor / Helen of Troy / Empress Joséphine / Genevieve of Brabant
- Massimo Serato as Pâris
- Alba Arnova as Vénus
- Elli Parvo as Junon
- Cathy O'Donnell as Enone
- Cesare Danova as Count Siegfried
- Terence Morgan as Golo
- Gérard Oury as Napoleon
- Milly Vitale as Marie-Louise
- Richard O'Sullivan as Benoni
- John Fraser as Drago
- Piero Pastore as Simon
- Enrico Glori as Priam
- Robert Beatty as Ménélas
- Anna Amendola as Minerve
- Guido Celano as Jupiter

== Production ==
The film had its genesis in a proposed television anthology series called Great Loves. Inspired by her success in Samson and Delilah, Hedy Lamarr and Victor Pahlen intended to produce the series about the love affairs of famous women throughout history. The episodes were to be directed by Edgar G. Ulmer who had collaborated with Hedy Lamarr in her production of The Strange Woman. The runaway production series was to consist of 39 half hour episodes photographed in colour with exteriors to be filmed on Continental European locations using frozen profits of American film producers. Star Hedy Lamarr was to be costumed by Haute couture fashion houses such as Jacques Fath and Dior.

When the television series idea was shelved, three of the teleplays were put together as the film to be shot in Italy. The original director Edgar G. Ulmer had multiple disputes with Hedy Lamarr and walked off the film.
