= Édith Jéhanne =

French film actress (1899–1949)

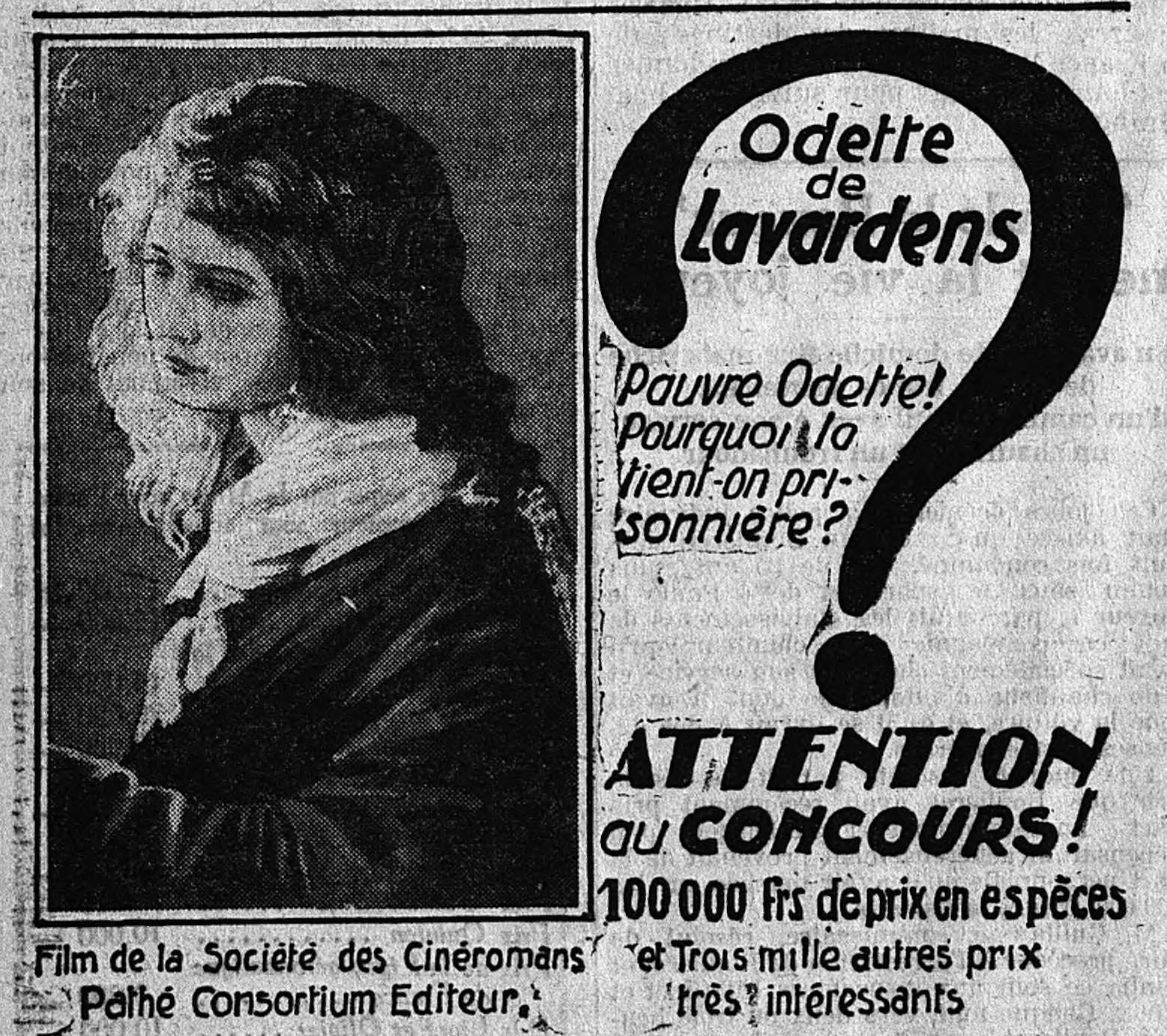
- Édith Jéhanne as Odette de Lavardens, in an advertisement for Rouletabille chez les Bohémiens, from Le Matin, 15 September 1922
- Born: Édithe Jeanne Cosson; 9 February 1899; Châteauroux, France
- Died: 14 June 1949 (aged 50); Saint-Briac-sur-Mer, France
- Occupation: Actress
- Years active: 1922–1930

Édith Jéhanne (born Édithe Jeanne Cosson, 9 February 1899 – 14 June 1949) (Note: Jéhanne's birth and death dates vary according to the sources. While André Siscot's Les gens de cinema lists 1899 and 1949, respectively, other sources gave 1902 as her year of birth. Jéhanne's regular director Raymond Bernard claimed that she died soon after finishing her last film in 1930.) was a French film actress of the silent and early sound era.

== Biography ==
Édithe Jeanne Cosson was born in 1899 in Châteauroux, Indre, (Note: The IMDb website indicates that she was born in 1899 in Châtelet, Cher, under her mother's name – Louise Beurdin. However, Édith Jeanne Beurdin, who was a seamstress, died in Paris in 1926 (sources: Archives de Cher, Archives de Paris). This completely erroneous information is nevertheless regularly repeated.) to Jean Baptiste Léonce Louis Cosson, a locksmith, and Thérèze Tartière, a seamstress. The family had seven children including the future painter Hélier Cosson (1897–1976), (Note: Héliard Cosson, born in 1897. Source: Archives de l'Indre, civil registry of Châteauroux.) and Elodie Cosson (1901–1954), who was the future daughter-in-law of the poet Paul Valéry and an actress under the name Sylvia Grey. (Note: Elodie Cosson appears to have acted (as Sylvia Grey) in only three films – The Secret of Rosette Lambert (1920), The House in the Forest (1922) and How I Killed My Child (1925). She should not be confused with the English actress of the same name (1866–1958), famous during the Victorian era.)

Édith Jéhanne discovered cinema as a teenager. It was while visiting her sister on the set of The Secret of Rosette Lambert in 1920 that she was reportedly discovered by the film's director, Raymond Bernard. She began her film career immediately, appearing in Raymond Bernard's Triplepatte (1922) and Henri Fescourt's Rouletabille chez les Bohémiens. She chose her two first names, spelled differently, as her stage name.

Throughout her career, ambiguity surrounded her personality. Biographical information about her is scarce, and often—probably intentionally—inaccurate. For example, it is sometimes stated that she was born in 1902. A 1926 article in Cinéa mentions the origin of her stage name but states that she was born in Berry, near Nohant-Vic. Other sources mention, without further details, that she was the younger sister of actress Sylvia Grey. In 1923, the two sisters appeared on the cover of the magazine Mon Ciné.

In 1927, she made what were arguably her most important films, Raymond Bernard's The Chess Player and Georg Wilhelm Pabst's The Love of Jeanne Ney.

In December 1927, she married Henri Jules Louis Bouyer, director of a dental school. She played her last roles shortly afterwards, in 1929. (Note: Her last two films, released in 1930, were shot in 1929.)

In his memoirs, Raymond Bernard believed he remembered that Édith Jéhanne had died shortly after the advent of talking pictures. In fact, she died in 1949, in Saint-Briac-sur-Mer.

== Critical assessment ==
Reviews of Jéhanne were often laudatory, presenting her as a promising artist.

She played the titular character and lead in The Love of Jeanne Ney, for which a contemporary critic commented

Her greatest attribute is a deep sensitiveness, a living the part she plays ... she goes through the film like an arrow, unblurred and definite and admirable. Her power is in her eyes which give the dual impression of defencelessness and courage.

However, some modern critics have felt her performance in the film was overshadowed by that of Brigitte Helm, who had appeared in Metropolis earlier that year.

Christine Leteux wrote of her performance in Tarakanova (1930):

She's a fresh-faced young actress with no theatrical experience, whereas producers tend to favour stage actresses like Huguette Duflos or Suzanne Bianchetti, who are often no longer quite the right age for their roles. Jéhanne has an expressive face and luminous eyes. She's closer to American actresses than to French screen stars. Her charm still works its magic on contemporary audiences.

== Filmography ==
- 1922: Rouletabille chez les Bohémiens (dir. Henri Fescourt)
- 1922: Triplepatte (dir. Raymond Bernard)
- 1924: Le Miracle des loups (dir. Raymond Bernard)
- 1927: The Chess Player (dir. Raymond Bernard)
- 1927: The Love of Jeanne Ney (dir. Georg Wilhelm Pabst)
- 1928: Le Perroquet verre (dir. Jean Milva)
- 1930: Tarakanova (dir. Raymond Bernard)
- 1930: Quand nous étions deux (dir. Léonce Perret)

== Bibliography ==
- MacPherson, Kenneth (December 1927). "Die Liebe der Jeanne Ney and its Making: An UFA film by Pabst". Close Up. Vol. 1, no. 6.
- Powrie, Phil; Rebillard, Éric (2009). Pierre Batcheff and stardom in 1920s French cinema. Edinburgh University Press. ISBN 978-0748621972.
- Marcus, Laura (2010). The Tenth Muse: Writing about Cinema in the Modernist Periodbooks.google.de. Oxford University Press. p. 337. ISBN 9780191615412.
- Wlaschin, Ken (2009). Silent Mystery and Detective Movies: A Comprehensive Filmography. McFarland. p. 195. ISBN 9780786454297.
- Klepper, Robert K. (2015). Silent Films, 1877-1996: A Critical Guide to 646 Movies. McFarland. p. 419. ISBN 9781476604848.
- van Schlun, Betsy (2016). The Pool Group and the Quest for Anthropological Universality: The Humane Images of Modernism. De Gruyter. ISBN 9783110439212.
