= Carlo Lombardi (actor) =

Italian actor (1900–1984)

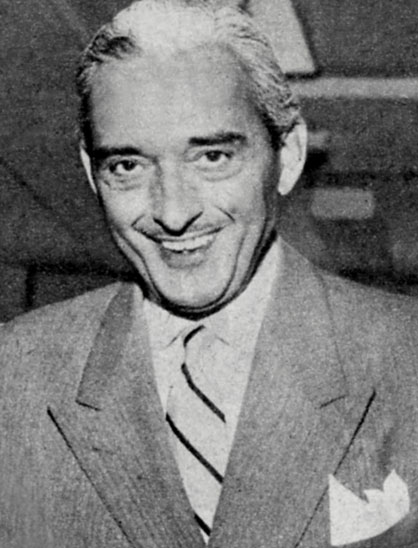
- Born: 2 January 1900; Lucca, Tuscany; Italy
- Died: 21 March 1984 (aged 84); Rome, Lazio; Italy
- Occupation: Actor
- Years active: 1930–1972 (film)

Carlo Lombardi (2 January 1900 – 21 March 1984) was an Italian stage and film actor. Later in his career he often worked in television. He appeared in a number of films during the Fascist era, including a leading role in the historical epic Scipio Africanus (1937).

== Selected filmography ==
- The Man with the Claw (1931)
- Pergolesi (1932)
- Zaganella and the Cavalier (1932)
- The Gift of the Morning (1932)
- Giallo (1933)
- Everybody's Woman (1934)
- The Anonymous Roylott (1936)
- Scipio Africanus (1937)
- The Last Enemy (1938)
- Star of the Sea (1938)
- Battles in the Shadow (1938)
- A Wife in Danger (1939)
- The Castle Ball (1939)
- A Thousand Lire a Month (1939)
- The Dream of Butterfly (1939)
- The First Woman Who Passes (1940)
- Light in the Darkness (1941)
- The Actor Who Disappeared (1941)
- The Secret Lover (1941)
- The Princess of Dreams (1942)
- Headlights in the Fog (1942)
- Torrents of Spring (1942)
- Lively Teresa (1943)
- The Priest's Hat (1944)
- The Tyrant of Padua (1946)
- The Devil's Gondola (1946)
- The Lady of the Camellias (1947)
- Baron Carlo Mazza (1948)
- Return to Naples (1949)
- Il nido di Falasco (1950)
- Captain Phantom (1953)
- Orphan of the Ghetto (1954)
- It Takes Two to Sin in Love (1954)
- The Giant of Marathon (1959)
- Hawk of the Caribbean (1962)
- Those Two in the Legion (1962)

== Bibliography ==
- Elley, Derek. The Epic Film: Myth and History. Routledge, 2013.
