= The Mask of Cesare Borgia =

- Directed by: Duilio Coletti
- Written by: Niccolò Machiavelli (tale); Mario Pannunzio; Piero Tellini; Primo Zeglio; Arrigo Benedetti; Duilio Coletti
- Produced by: Vittorio Vassarotti
- Starring: Osvaldo Valenti; Elsa De Giorgi; Carlo Tamberlani
- Cinematography: Jan Stallich
- Edited by: Maria Rosada
- Music by: Piero Giorgi
- Production company: Vi-Va Film
- Distributed by: Artisti Associati
- Release date: 27 September 1941
- Running time: 75 minutes
- Country: Italy
- Language: Italian

The Mask of Cesare Borgia (Italian: La maschera di Cesare Borgia) is a 1941 Italian historical drama film directed by Duilio Coletti and starring Osvaldo Valenti, Elsa De Giorgi and Carlo Tamberlani. Coletti asserted that the 1948 20th Century Fox film Prince of Foxes was a remake of his work, the American studio having bought the rights, although the latter film's source is credited as a novel of the same title by Samuel Shellabarger.

It was shot at the Cinecittà Studios in Rome. The film's sets were designed by the art directors Antonio Tagliolini and Enrico Verdozzi.

== Cast ==
- Osvaldo Valenti as Cesare Borgia
- Elsa De Giorgi as Dianora
- Carlo Tamberlani as Jacopo Bentivoglio
- Enrico Glori as Sinistro dei Falchi
- Augusto Marcacci as Agapito
- Nerio Bernardi as Il padre di Jacopo
- Gildo Bocci as Ramiro d'Orca
- Renato Chiantoni as Un paggio
- Corrado De Cenzo as Michelazzo
- Lina Tartara Minora as Antonia
- Gina Cinquini
- Rolando Costantino
- Giovanni Dal Cortivo
- Antonietta Del Do
- Walter Grant
- Romano Karninki
- Achille Majeroni
- Antonio Marietti
- Renato Navarrini
- Egisto Olivieri
- Nico Pepe
- Evaristo Signorini
- Mario Siletti

== Bibliography ==
- Alberto Anile. Orson Welles in Italy. Indiana University Press, 2013.
