= Wilfred Shingleton =

English art director (1914–1983)

- Born: January 24, 1914
- Died: 1983 (aged 68–69)
- Occupation: Art director
- Awards: Academy Award for Best Art Direction (1948)

Wilfred Shingleton (January 24, 1914 – June, 1983) was an English art director. He enjoyed a distinguished career in the British film industry from his debut in 1937. Some of his early assignments were several George Formby vehicles – hugely popular with wartime audiences.

His career really kicked off into a higher gear in 1947 when he won the Academy Award for his atmospheric sets for David Lean's Great Expectations.

This led to a string of high-profile projects, including Anna Karenina (1948), The African Queen (1951) and Beat the Devil (1953), both for director John Huston, Hobson's Choice (1954) and Tunes of Glory (1960).

He won a BAFTA for the wartime flying epic The Blue Max in 1966, after which he moved seamlessly into the world of TV, working on the stylish hit series The Avengers.

He received an Emmy nomination for the miniseries Holocaust in 1978, winning the award two years later for the TV movie Gauguin the Savage. His last film – for which he received a BAFTA nomination – was the Merchant Ivory film Heat and Dust in 1983.

== Selected filmography ==
- The Fortunate Fool (1933)
- It's in the Air (1938)
- Trouble Brewing (1939)
- The Four Just Men (1939)
- Great Expectations (1946)
- The Cure for Love (1949)
- Shadow of the Eagle (1950)
- The Rival of the Empress (1951)
- The African Queen (1951)
- Who Goes There! (1952)
- Beat the Devil (1953)
- Hobson's Choice (1954)
- Carrington V.C. (1955)
- Port Afrique (1956)
- I was Monty's Double (1958)
- The Pure Hell of St. Trinian's (1960)
- The Innocents (1961)
- The Blue Max (1966)
- The Avengers (TV series)(six episodes) (1967)
- The Fearless Vampire Killers (1967)
- Macbeth (1971)
- Endless Night (1972)
- The Lady Vanishes (1979)
- Eye of the Needle (1981)
- Heat and Dust (1983)
