= Hagar Wilde =

American screenwriter (1905–1971)

- Hagar Wilde, from a 1931 newspaper
- Born: Beverly Violet Bidwell; July 7, 1905; Toledo, Ohio, US
- Died: September 25, 1971 (aged 66); California, US
- Other names: Hagar Wilde Bekassy (after 1941)
- Occupation: Screenwriter
- Known for: Bringing Up Baby (1938; story, co-writer of screenplay); I Was a Male War Bride (1949, screenplay)
- Spouse(s): Harold Chandler Murner (1923–1928); Ernest Victor Heyn (divorced); Stephen Bekassy (1941–1953)
- Children: 1

Hagar Wilde (July 7, 1905 – September 25, 1971) was an American novelist, short story writer, playwright, and screenwriter from the 1930s through the 1950s. She is perhaps best known for the screenplays for Bringing Up Baby (1938) and I Was a Male War Bride (1949), two Howard Hawks films, both starring Cary Grant.

== Early life ==
Hagar Wilde was born Beverly Violet Bidwell in Toledo, Ohio.

== Career ==
Wilde was a prolific young short story writer and debut novelist when she was hired by billionaire Howard Hughes in 1931, to write dialogue for The Age for Love, starring Billie Dove. Her association with director Howard Hawks included co-writing (with Dudley Nichols) the screenplay for Bringing Up Baby (for which she had also written the original story, published in the magazine Collier's Weekly), and the screenplay for I Was a Male War Bride (1949). She also co-wrote the screenplay for The Unseen (1945), with Raymond Chandler, based on the novel Midnight House by Ethel Lina White.

Wilde wrote two shows produced on Broadway. Her first stage success was a "taut little horror drama" titled Guest in the House (1942); she co-wrote the play with Dale Eunson, and it was adapted into a film in 1944. She also wrote Made in Heaven (1946–1947). In the 1950s she worked extensively in adapting scripts for television.

== Personal life ==
Wilde was married at least four times. Her first husband was Harold Chandler Murner; they were married from 1923 to 1928. Her second husband was Ernest Victor Heyn. She divorced Heyn and married her third husband, actor Stephen Bekassy, in 1941. She had a daughter, Stephanie, with Bekassy, before they divorced in 1953. Her fourth husband was an Englishman; that marriage also ended. She died in 1971 at the Motion Picture Country Home in California, aged 66 years.

== Selected filmography ==
- The Age for Love (1931)
- Bringing Up Baby (1938)
- Carefree (1938)
- Fired Wife (1943)
- Guest in the House (1944)
- The Unseen (1945)
- I Was a Male War Bride (1949)
- Red, Hot and Blue (1949)
- Shadow of the Eagle (1950)
- The Rival of the Empress (1951)
- This is My Love (1954)
