= Marcella (film) =

1937 film

- Directed by: Guido Brignone
- Written by: Carlo Bugiani; Victorien Sardou (play); Aldo Vergano
- Produced by: Livio Pavanelli
- Starring: Emma Gramatica; Caterina Boratto; Antonio Centa
- Cinematography: Otello Martelli
- Edited by: Giuseppe Fatigati
- Music by: Salvatore Allegra
- Production company: Società Anonima Films Attualità
- Release date: 1937
- Running time: 76 minutes
- Country: Italy
- Language: Italian

Marcella is a 1937 Italian drama film directed by Guido Brignone and starring Emma Gramatica, Caterina Boratto and Antonio Centa. It is based on a play by Victorien Sardou.

The film's sets were designed by the art director Guido Fiorini and Alberto Manzi.

== Cast ==
- Emma Gramatica as La baronessa Contuni
- Caterina Boratto as Marcella
- Antonio Centa as Oliviero
- Mino Doro as Renato
- Aristide Baghetti
- Mario Ferrari
- Paolo Stoppa
- Guglielmo Barnabò
- Giuseppe Addobbati
- Nada Fiorelli
- Gian Paolo Rosmino
- Rina Molé
- Luigi Pellegrini
- Laura Redi

== Bibliography ==
- Goble, Alan. The Complete Index to Literary Sources in Film. Walter de Gruyter, 1999.
