= The Sun Still Rises =

1946 film directed by Aldo Vergano

Il sole sorge ancora
- Directed by: Aldo Vergano
- Written by: Giuseppe Gorgerino; Guido Aristarco; Giuseppe De Santis; Carlo Lizzani; Aldo Vergano; Vittorio Cottafavi
- Produced by: Giorgio Agliani
- Starring: Elli Parvo; Massimo Serato; Lea Padovani
- Cinematography: Aldo Tonti
- Edited by: Gabriele Varriale
- Music by: Giuseppe Rosati
- Production company: ANPI
- Distributed by: ENIC
- Release date: 6 November 1946
- Running time: 90 minutes
- Country: Italy
- Language: Italian

The Sun Still Rises (Italian: Il sole sorge ancora) also known as Outcry is a 1946 Italian neorealist war-drama film directed by Aldo Vergano and starring Elli Parvo, Massimo Serato and Lea Padovani.

It was one of two films produced by the ANPI movement along with Giuseppe De Santis's Tragic Hunt (1947).

The film entered the competition at the 7th Venice International Film Festival. For his performance Massimo Serato won the Nastro d'Argento for Best Supporting Actor. The film also won a special Nastro d'Argento for outstanding formal merits.

== Synopsis ==
Following the Armistice of 1943, Cesare and his comrades leave the army and return to their homes. For Cesare this is a village in the Lombardy countryside outside Milan. There he becomes involved with Laura, a seamstress, but is also attracted to Mathilde an aristocrat. He is drawn back into the war when both the Italian Resistance and the German Army move into the area. After they shoot the local priest, the inhabitants rise up against the Germans and drive them out with the assistance of the partisans.

== Cast ==
- Elli Parvo as Matilde
- Lea Padovani as Laura
- Vittorio Duse as Cesare
- Massimo Serato as Major Heinrich
- Gillo Pontecorvo as Pietro
- Checco Rissone as Mario
- Carlo Lizzani as Don Camillo
- Ada Cristina Almirante as Countess
- Egisto Olivieri as Laura's Father
- Giuseppe De Santis as Count's attendant
- Alfonso Gatto as Train conductor
- Mirko Ellis as Nazi officer
- Checco Durante
- Guido Aristarco

== Bibliography ==
- Gundle, Stephen. Fame Amid the Ruins: Italian Film Stardom in the Age of Neorealism. Berghahn Books, 2019.
