= Tarakanova (film) =

1930 film directed by Raymond Bernard

- Movie poster
- Directed by: Raymond Bernard
- Starring: Édith Jéhanne; Paule Andral; Olaf Fjord
- Release date: 1930
- Country: France
- Language: French

Tarakanova is a 1930 French historical drama film directed by Raymond Bernard and starring Édith Jéhanne, Paule Andral and Olaf Fjord. It depicts the life of Princess Tarakanoff the pretender to the throne of Catherine II in Eighteenth Century Russia.

== Cast ==
- Édith Jéhanne – Tarakanova / Soeur Dosithée
- Paule Andral – L'Impératrice Catherine II
- Olaf Fjord – Le Comte Alexis Orlof
- Rudolf Klein-Rogge – Le Comte Chouvalof
- Charles Lamy – Le Prince Charles Kradziwell
- Camille Bert – L'Amiral Greigh
- Antonin Artaud – Le jeune tzigane
- Ernest Ferny – Le Comte Potemkine
- Andrew Brunelle – Kansoff

== See also ==
- Princess Tarakanova (1910)
- Princess Tarakanova (1938)
- Shadow of the Eagle (1950)
- The Rival of the Empress (1951)

== Bibliography ==
- Powrie, Phil & Rebillard, Éric. Pierre Batcheff and stardom in 1920s French cinema. Edinburgh University Press, 2009
