= Aldo Tonti =

Italian cinematographer

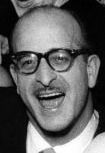

Aldo Tonti (2 March 1910 – 2 July 1988) was an Italian cinematographer.

Born in Rome, Tonti started his career as photographer, then entered the film industry as an assistant camera operator. He debuted as a cinematographer in 1939, with Piccoli naufraghi by Flavio Calzavara; his first important work was Ossessione by Luchino Visconti. His works include films by Federico Fellini, King Vidor, Richard Fleischer, Roberto Rossellini, John Huston, Alberto Lattuada, Mario Monicelli, Sergio Sollima, Pietro Germi, Dino Risi, Marco Ferreri. In 1961 he won a Silver Ribbon for best cinematography for Nicholas Ray's The Savage Innocents. Tonti retired in 1982.

== Selected filmography ==
- Odette (1934)
- Under the Southern Cross (1938)
- Cardinal Messias (1939)
- Diamonds (1939)
- Hurricane in the Tropics (1939)
- The Cavalier from Kruja (1940)
- The Pirate's Dream (1940)
- Caravaggio (1941)
- Blood Wedding (1941)
- Headlights in the Fog (1942)
- I Live as I Please (1942)
- Bengasi (1942)
- Nothing New Tonight (1942)
- Ossessione (1943)
- The Champion (1943)
- A Living Statue (1943)
- A Little Wife (1943)
- In High Places (1943)
- The Gates of Heaven (1945)
- The Testimony (1946)
- The Bandit (1946)
- The Sun Still Rises (1946)
- Rome, Free City (1946)
- Peddlin' in Society (1946)
- Flesh Will Surrender (1947)
- The Captain's Daughter (1947)
- Without Pity (1948)
- Hey Boy (1948)
- The Wolf of the Sila (1949)
- The Firemen of Viggiù (1949)
- The Mill on the Po (1949)
- Little Lady (1949)
- Outlaw Girl (1950)
- I'm in the Revue (1950)
- Side Street Story (1950)
- The Cadets of Gascony (1950)
- The Merry Widower (1950)
- The Elusive Twelve (1950)
- Europe '51 (1952)
- Easy Years (1953)
- The Unfaithfuls (1953)
- The Ship of Condemned Women (1953)
- La lupa (1953)
- Where Is Freedom? (1954)
- Attila (1954)
- Are We Men or Corporals? (1955)
- Nights of Cabiria (1957)
- Souvenirs d'Italie (1957)
- Tempest (1958)
- Move and I'll Shoot (1958)
- Fortunella (1958)
- Winter Holidays (1959)
- The Hunchback of Rome (1960)
- The Savage Innocents (1960)
- Under Ten Flags (1960)
- Barabbas (1961)
- Damon and Pythias (1962)
- Agostino (1962)
- Il diavolo (1963)
- Kali Yug: Goddess of Vengeance (1963)
- The Mystery of the Indian Temple (1963)
- The Ape Woman (1964)
- The Man, the Woman and the Money (1965)
- Treasure of San Gennaro (1966)
- The Devil in Love (1966)
- If All the Women in the World (1966)
- Cast a Giant Shadow (1966)
- Catch as Catch Can (1967)
- Reflections in a Golden Eye (1967)
- Bandits in Rome (1968)
- The Black Sheep (1968)
- Violent City (1970)
- Brancaleone at the Crusades (1970)
- A Girl in Australia (1971)
- The Designated Victim (1971)
- The Deserter (1971)
- The Valachi Papers (1972)
- It Can Be Done Amigo (1972)
- War Goddess (1973)
- Mean Frank and Crazy Tony (1973)
- Three Tough Guys (1974)
- Crazy Joe (1974)
- The Count of Monte Cristo (1975)
- Due cuori, una cappella (1975)
- Strange Occasion (1976)
- A Woman at Her Window (1976)
- Ashanti (1979)
