= Short Circuit (1943 film) =

- Directed by: Giacomo Gentilomo
- Written by: Mino Caudana; Ezio D'Errico; Ernesto Grassi; Mario Monicelli; Giacomo Gentilomo
- Starring: Vivi Gioi; Umberto Melnati; Guglielmo Barnabò; Lauro Gazzolo
- Cinematography: Giorgio Orsini
- Edited by: Renzo Lucidi
- Music by: Ezio Carabella
- Production companies: Arno Film; Iris Film
- Distributed by: Rex Film
- Release date: 6 April 1943
- Running time: 85 minutes
- Country: Italy
- Language: Italian

Short Circuit (Italian: Cortocircuito) is a 1943 Italian thriller film directed by Giacomo Gentilomo and starring Vivi Gioi, Umberto Melnati and Guglielmo Barnabò. The film was made at the Pisorno Studios in Tirrenia. It is one of several films considered as a possible precursor to the giallo genre.

== Cast ==
- Vivi Gioi as Cristina Redy
- Umberto Melnati as Ugo Redy, suo marito
- Guglielmo Barnabò as Il gionalista Saverio Funk
- Bianca Doria as Eva Fredy
- Lauro Gazzolo as L'editore Isidoro Storch
- Gilda Marchiò as La signora Ipanoff
- Giacomo Moschini as Il commissario Plunk
- Egisto Olivieri as Il professore Ermanno Heker
- Gualtiero Isnenghi as Il dottor Besson
- Mario Besesti as Gruner, l'aiuntante del commissario
- Enzo Biliotti as Il barone Von Springher
- Dina Perbellini as La contessa
- Mirka Bereny as L'infermiera
- Dino Di Luca as Il primo giocatore di scacchi
- Gerardo Frossi as Un domestico della clinica
- Luisa Garella as La direttrice della casa editrice "Centauro"
- Fausto Guerzoni as Il secondo giocatore di scacchi
- Guido Notari as Il professore Muller
- Giuseppe Pierozzi as Il commendatore nella clinica

== Bibliography ==
- Moliterno, Gino. A to Z of Italian Cinema. Scarecrow Press, 2009.
