= Laugh, Pagliacci =

1943 film

- Directed by: Giuseppe Fatigati
- Written by: Harald Bratt; Ruggero Leoncavallo; Cesare Giulio Viola
- Starring: Alida Valli; Beniamino Gigli; Carlo Romano
- Cinematography: Fritz Arno Wagner
- Edited by: Jolanda Benvenuti
- Music by: Ruggero Leoncavallo; Willy Schmidt-Gentner
- Production companies: Itala Film; Tobis Film
- Distributed by: Industrie Cinematografiche Italiane
- Release date: 23 January 1943
- Running time: 90 minutes
- Countries: Italy; Germany
- Language: Italian

Laugh, Pagliacci (Italian: I pagliacci) is a 1943 Italian-German historical drama film directed by Giuseppe Fatigati and starring Alida Valli, Beniamino Gigli and Carlo Romano. A separate German-language version Laugh Bajazzo was also produced. It was shot in Berlin at a time when Nazi Germany and Fascist Italy were allies in the Second World War. The film's sets were designed by the art director Hans Kuhnert.

== Cast ==
- Alida Valli as Giulia Valmondi
- Beniamino Gigli as Il tenore Morelli
- Carlo Romano as Ruggero Leoncavallo
- Paul Hörbiger as Canio
- Dagny Servaes as La contessa Valmondi
- Karl Martell as Il marchese Carlo Lanzoni
- Gina Cinquini as Emilia
- Paolo Ferrari as Ruggero Leoncavallo da bambino
- Angelo Ferrari as Silvio
- Adriana Perris as Interprete dell' opera nel ruolo di Nedda
- Leone Pacci as Interprete dell' opera nel ruolo di Tonio
- Mario Boviello as Interprete dell' opera nel ruolo di Silvio
- Adelio Zagonara as Interprete dell' opera nel ruolo di Beppe

== Bibliography ==
- Bock, Hans-Michael & Bergfelder, Tim. The Concise Cinegraph: Encyclopaedia of German Cinema. Berghahn Books, 2009.
- Parish, James Robert. Film Actors Guide: Western Europe. Scarecrow Press, 1977.
