= Erwin Hillier =

German cinematographer (1911–2005)

- Born: 2 September 1911; Berlin, German Empire
- Died: 10 January 2005 (aged 93); London, England
- Education: Academy of Arts, Berlin
- Occupation: Cinematographer
- Years active: 1931–1970
- Spouse: Helen Yates-Southgate

Erwin Hillier, BSC (2 September 1911 – 10 January 2005) was a German cinematographer, long based in the United Kingdom. He was best known for his work in British cinema from the 1940s to 1960s, and in particular his work with Michael Anderson and the duo of Powell and Pressburger. He was nominated for a BAFTA Award for Best Cinematography (Colour) for Sammy Going South (1963), and was a founding member of the British Society of Cinematographers.

== Early life and career ==
Hillier was born in Berlin to Jewish parents from Germany and England (original surname Hiller). He studied painting at the Academy of Arts, Berlin, but was forced to drop out due to financial difficulties.

Impressed by Hillier's paintings, the director F. W. Murnau offered him a job as camera assistant on Tabu (1931), but Hillier's father intervened because of Murnau's homosexuality. Fortunately, Murnau recommended him to director Fritz Lang at UFA studios, who employed him on his classic M (1931). Soon after, he moved to Britain to escape the rise of Nazism.

In Britain, he worked as a camera assistant for Gaumont-British, where he worked with Hitchcock. He later moved to Elstree Studios, working on The Man Behind the Mask (1936) with Michael Powell, who noted his "insane enthusiasm". His debut as cinematographer came with Lady from Lisbon (1942).

== Work with The Archers ==
Impressed by his work on The Silver Fleet (1943) for their Archers Film Productions, Powell & Pressburger ('The Archers') hired Hillier as cinematographer on A Canterbury Tale (1944), a film about which Powell later said Hillier "did a marvellous job". Despite Powell's recent work with the three-strip Technicolour film process, war shortages meant a return to the black-and-white stock with which Hillier was familiar. The film is a mixture of British realism and the German expressionist use of extreme light and shade which Hillier has been trained in, and is remembered for its depiction of the English landscape. In his autobiography, Powell recalled his obsession with clouds; he often begged for filming to be delayed until a cloud had appeared to break up a clear sky.

His next film I Know Where I'm Going! (1945), again with The Archers, continued the style of its predecessor. It features Hillier's technical accomplishments, including mixing studio shots with exteriors, concealing the fact that Roger Livesey, the film's male lead, was working in London while the film was being shot in Scotland.

With the war at an end, Powell & Pressburger at last had access to colour film. They asked Hillier to share cinematographic duties with the experienced Technicolor cameraman Jack Cardiff on A Matter of Life and Death. Unwilling to be sidelined, he declined, bringing his intensely creative partnership with Powell & Pressburger to an end.

== Post-war career ==
Hillier made his first colour film London Town (1946), starring Sid Field, although he often returned to work in black and white, typical of many British films of the 1940s and 1950s. His films retained a distinctive expressionist influence in both mediums.

He worked for director Michael Anderson on Private Angelo (1949), the first of many collaborations. The last was to be opulent The Shoes of the Fisherman (1968). Their best remembered film is The Dam Busters (1955), featuring some aerial photography by Hillier.

He continued to work until 1970.

== Death ==
Hillier died in London in 2005, aged 93 leaving a widow, a daughter, and sister Gerda Ehrenzweig.

== Selected filmography ==
- Sing as You Swing (1937)
- Stardust (1938)
- Lady from Lisbon (1942)
- Rhythm Serenade (1943)
- Welcome, Mr. Washington (1944)
- A Canterbury Tale (1944)
- I Know Where I'm Going! (1945)
- London Town (1946)
- They Knew Mr. Knight (1946)
- The Mark of Cain (1947)
- Mr. Perrin and Mr. Traill (1948)
- The Interrupted Journey (1949)
- Shadow of the Eagle (1950)
- The Rival of the Empress (1951)
- The Woman's Angle (1952)
- Father's Doing Fine (1952)
- The Dam Busters (1954)
- Chase a Crooked Shadow (1958)
- Go to Blazes (1962)
- Sammy Going South (1963)
- The Quiller Memorandum (1966)
- Eye of the Devil (1966)
- The Shoes of the Fisherman (1968)
