= Maria Rosada =

Italian film editor (1899–1970)

- Born: 2 February 1899; Pietramelara, Italy
- Died: 17 January 1970 (aged 70); Terracina, Italy
- Occupation: Editor
- Years active: 1937–1967 (film)

Maria Rosada (1899-1970) was an Italian film editor.

== Selected filmography ==
- The Three Wishes (1937)
- The House of Shame (1938)
- A Wife in Danger (1939)
- The Fornaretto of Venice (1939)
- Unjustified Absence (1939)
- Captain Fracasse (1940)
- The Mask of Cesare Borgia (1941)
- Before the Postman (1942)
- Sleeping Beauty (1942)
- Apparition (1943)
- Harlem (1943)
- The Innkeeper (1944)
- Cats and Dogs (1952)
- Martin Toccaferro (1953)
- The Mysteries of Paris (1957)

== Bibliography ==
- Peter Brunette. Roberto Rossellini. University of California Press, 1996.
