= Egisto Olivieri =

Italian stage and film actor

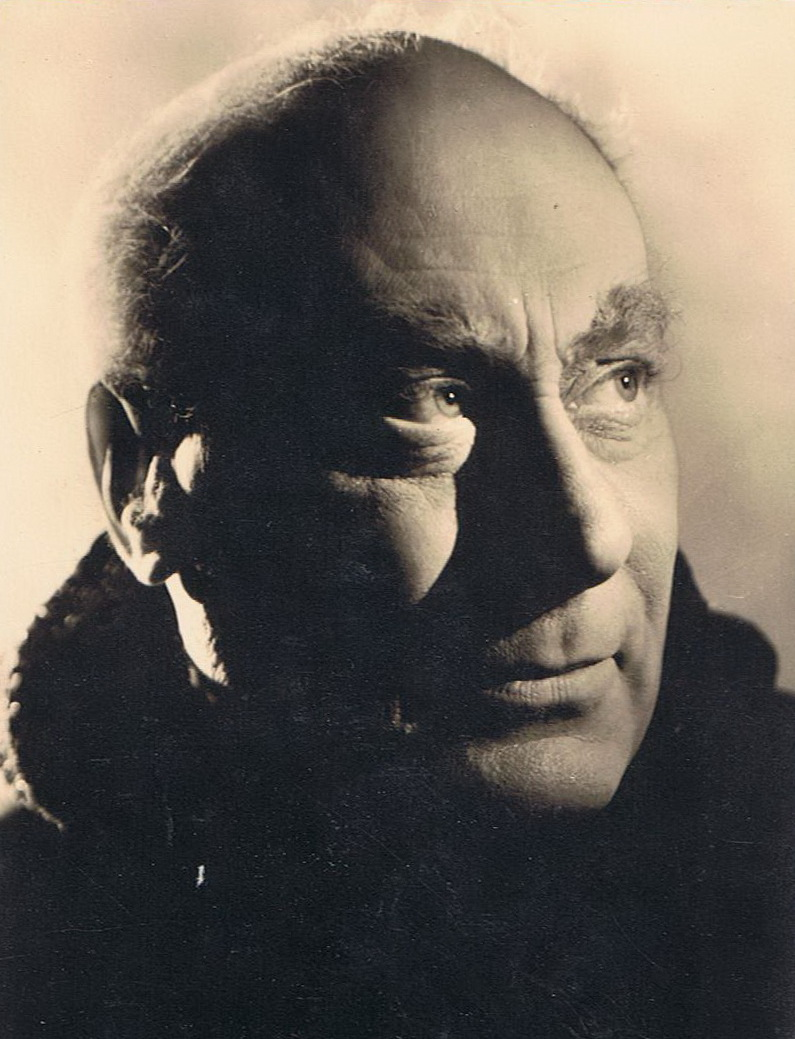
- Born: 21 March 1880; Rome, Lazio, Italy
- Died: 4 March 1962 (aged 81); Bologna, Emilia-Romagna, Italy
- Occupation: Actor
- Years active: 1933–1951 (film)

Egisto Olivieri (1880–1962) was an Italian stage and film actor. He appeared in more than forty films during his career including The Little School Mistress (1934). His final film appearance was in Vittorio De Sica's Miracle in Milan (1951)

== Selected filmography ==
- The Haller Case (1933)
- Everybody's Woman (1934)
- The Little School Mistress (1934)
- Aldebaran (1935)
- Luciano Serra, Pilot (1938)
- The Silent Partner (1939)
- Captain Fracasse (1940)
- The King of England Will Not Pay (1941)
- The Mask of Cesare Borgia (1941)
- Carmela (1942)
- Love Story (1942)
- Short Circuit (1943)
- I'll Always Love You (1943)
- Two Suffer Better Than One (1943)
- Resurrection (1944)
- The Sun Still Rises (1946)
- Departure at Seven (1946)
- Hand of Death (1949)
- Mistress of the Mountains (1950)
- Songs in the Streets (1950)
- Miracle in Milan (1951)
