= Manon Lescaut (1940 film) =

1940 film directed by Carmine Gallone

- Directed by: Carmine Gallone
- Written by: Abbé Prévost (novel); Guido Cantini; Carmine Gallone
- Starring: Alida Valli; Vittorio De Sica; Lamberto Picasso
- Cinematography: Oswald Hafenrichter
- Edited by: Vincenzo Zampi
- Music by: Anchise Brizzi
- Production company: Grandi Film
- Distributed by: ICI
- Release date: 2 February 1940
- Running time: 92 minutes
- Country: Italy
- Language: Italian

Manon Lescaut is a 1940 Italian historical drama film directed by Carmine Gallone and starring Alida Valli, Vittorio De Sica and Lamberto Picasso. It is an adaptation of the Abbé Prévost's novel of the same title. The film was made at the Cinecittà studios in Rome with sets designed by the art directors Ivo Battelli and Guido Fiorini.

== Cast ==
- Alida Valli as Manon Lescaut
- Vittorio De Sica as Renato Des Grieux
- Lamberto Picasso as Il visconte Des Grieux
- Giulio Donadio as Il marquese De Brienne
- Dino Di Luca as Il sergente Lescaut
- Jole Voleri as Musette
- Lilia Dale as Denise
- Andrea Checchi as Marius
- Guglielmo Barnabò as Il governatore di New Orleans
- Carlo Bressan as Edmond
- Aroldo Tieri as Il segretario di De Brienne
- Oreste Fares as Il cappellano
- Amina Pirani Maggi as Una nobile pettegola al ballo
- Lola Braccini as La direttrice
- Pina Gallini as Una dei tre creditori
- Giuseppe Pierozzi as Un dei tre creditori
- Cesare Polacco as Un dei tre creditori
- Luigi Allodoli
- Diana Karenne
- Guido Notari
- Michele Riccardini
- Anna Vivaldi
- Maria-Pia Vivaldi

== Bibliography ==
- Klossner, Michael. The Europe of 1500-1815 on Film and Television. McFarland & Company, 2002.
