= Love Story (1942 film) =

1942 film

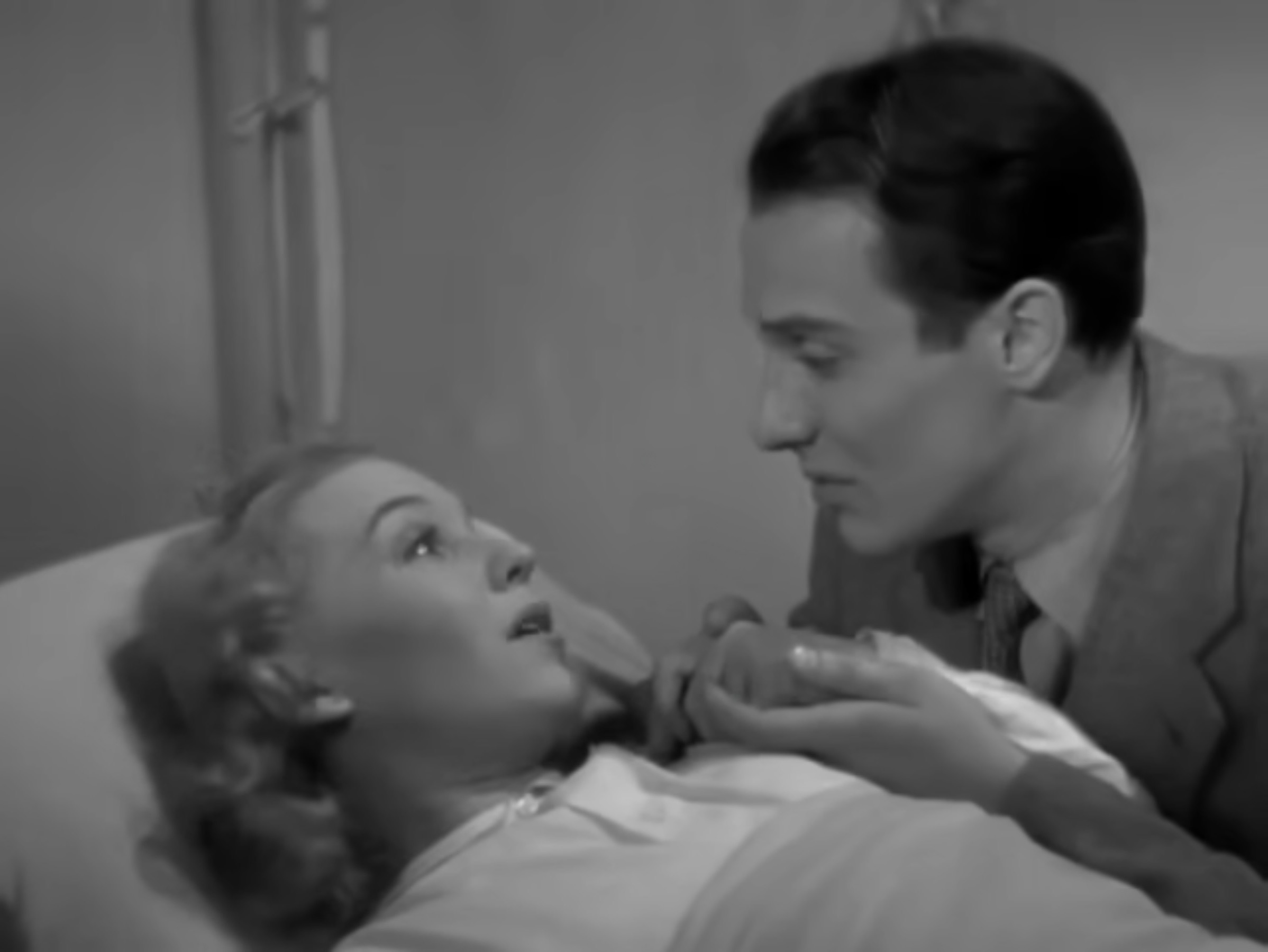
- Noris and Lulli in a film scene
- Directed by: Mario Camerini
- Written by: Mario Camerini; Gaspare Cataldo; Giulio Morelli; Mario Pannunzio; Gino Visentini
- Based on: Life Begins by Mary McDougal Axelson
- Produced by: Giampaolo Bigazzi
- Starring: Assia Noris; Piero Lulli; Carlo Campanini
- Cinematography: Arturo Gallea
- Edited by: Mario Camerini
- Music by: Fernando Previtali
- Production company: Lux Film
- Distributed by: Lux Film
- Release date: 9 September 1942
- Running time: 88 minutes
- Country: Italy
- Language: Italian

Love Story (Italian: Una storia d'amore) is a 1942 Italian drama film directed by Mario Camerini and starring Assia Noris, Piero Lulli and Carlo Campanini. It is based on the play Life Begins by Mary McDougal Axelson, previously adapted into a 1932 film of the same title and a 1939 film A Child Is Born. Along with A Pistol Shot it marked an attempt to showcase Noris as a dramatic actress, rather than the White Telephone comedies she had become known for. It was screened at the 1942 Venice Film Festival.

It was produced by Lux Film, one of the leading film companies of Fascist Italy. It was shot at the Cinecittà Studios in Rome. The film's sets were designed by the art directors Gastone Medin and Gino Brosio. The future star Marcello Mastroianni appeared briefly as an uncredited extra.

== Plot ==
A young woman with a troubled past marries a worker from a mechanical engineering factory and tries to live a respectable life. However a man who knows her background attempts to blackmail her and loses her head and kills him. She is sentenced to ten years in prison, and gives birth to a child while in jail.

== Cast ==
- Assia Noris as Anna Roberti
- Piero Lulli as Gianni Castelli
- Carlo Campanini as Agostino
- Guido Notari as Ferreri
- Osvaldo Genazzani as Sandro
- Emilio Cigoli as L'avvocato difensore
- Emma Baron as L'infermiera della clinica
- Antonio Battistella as Enrico Banducci
- Giorgio Capecchi as L'aiuto chirurgo
- Dhia Cristiani as Clara
- Olinto Cristina as Il presidente del tribunale
- Gualtiero De Angelis as Il poliziotto di notte
- Luigi Giovarella as Il professor Venturi
- Augusto Marcacci as L'avvocato dell'accusa
- Marcello Mastroianni as Extra
- Carlo Micheluzzi as Bibi - il padre ansioso
- Egisto Olivieri as Il primo agente della questura
- Amina Pirani Maggi as La padrona della Pensione Gallini
- Vanna Polverosi as La madre dei due gemelli
- Luisa Ventura as La padrona della pasticceria
- Ciro Berardi as l'usciere dell'officina SIMA

== Bibliography ==
- Aprà, Adriano. The Fabulous Thirties: Italian cinema 1929-1944. Electa International, 1979.
- Dewey, Donald. Marcello Mastroianni: His Life and Art. Carol Publishing Group, 1993.
