= The First Woman Who Passes =

1940 film directed by Max Neufeld

- Directed by: Max Neufeld
- Written by: Alessandro De Stefani
- Starring: Alida Valli; Carlo Lombardi; Ninì Gordini Cervi; Lisa Varna
- Cinematography: Tino Santoni
- Edited by: Vincenzo Zampi
- Music by: Carlo Innocenzi
- Production company: Italcine
- Distributed by: ICI
- Release date: 26 October 1940
- Running time: 82 minutes
- Country: Italy
- Language: Italian

The First Woman Who Passes (Italian: La prima donna che passa) is a 1940 Italian historical comedy film directed by Max Neufeld and starring Alida Valli, Carlo Lombardi and Ninì Gordini Cervi. The film is set in eighteenth century France. It was made at the Palatino Studios in Rome.

== Cast ==
- Alida Valli as Gabrielle de Vervins
- Carlo Lombardi as Il duca di Richelieu
- Ninì Gordini Cervi as La marchesa de Prie
- Giuseppe Rinaldi as Raoul d'Aubigny
- Lisa Varna as Marietta
- Achille Majeroni as Il vescovo di Fleury
- Olinto Cristina as Il conte di Vervins
- Guglielmo Barnabò as Il console d'Auvray
- Giuseppe Pierozzi as Il duca di Borbone
- Renato Malavasi as Andrea
- Augusto Marcacci as Il governatore Delaroche
- Emilio Petacci as Lagrange
- Mario Giannini as Luigi XV
- Diana Lante as Madame Charolais
- Eugenio Duse as Piccard

== Bibliography ==
- Gundle, Stephen. Mussolini's Dream Factory: Film Stardom in Fascist Italy. Berghahn Books, 2013.
