= Princess Tarakanova (1938 film) =

1938 film

- Directed by: Mario Soldati; Fyodor Otsep
- Written by: Jacques Companéez; André Lang; Evelina Levi; Hans Jacoby; Henri Jeanson; Ladislao Vajda; Mario Soldati
- Produced by: Robert Dandi; Seymour Nebenzal
- Starring: Annie Vernay; Pierre Richard-Willm; Roger Karl; Suzy Prim
- Cinematography: Curt Courant; Massimo Terzano
- Edited by: Georges Friedland; Ferdinando Maria Poggioli
- Music by: Renzo Rossellini; Antonio Veretti; Riccardo Zandonai
- Production companies: Chronos Films; Nero Film; SAFI
- Distributed by: EIA; Les Distributeurs Associés
- Release date: 16 March 1938
- Running time: 95 minutes
- Countries: France; Italy
- Languages: French; Italian

Princess Tarakanova (Italian: La principessa Tarakanova) is a 1938 French-Italian historical film directed by Fyodor Otsep and Mario Soldati and starring Annie Vernay, Pierre Richard-Willm and Roger Karl. It portrays the life of the 18th century pretender to the Russian throne Princess Tarakanova. The story has been turned into films a number of times including a 1930 film, Tarakanova.

The film's sets were designed by Andrej Andrejew, Guido Fiorini and Ettore Corsi.

The film was released in the USA under the title Betrayal.

== Cast ==
- Annie Vernay as Élisabeth Tarakanova - la prétendante au trône de Russie
- Pierre Richard-Willm as Il conte Alexis Orloff / Le comte Alexis Orloff - le favori de Catherine II
- Roger Karl as Il principe Radziwill / Le prince Radziwill
- Suzy Prim as L'imperatrice Caterina II / L'impératrice Catherine II
- Memo Benassi as L'ambasciatore russo (In the Italian version)
- Georges Paulais as L'ambassadeur russe (In the French version)
- Guglielmo Sinaz as Il grande inquisitore (In the Italian version)
- René Bergeron as Le grand inquisiteur (In the French version)
- Anna Magnani as Marietta, la cameriera (In the Italian version)
- Janine Merrey as Mariette, la camériste (In the French version)
- Antonio Centa as Il capitano Sleptozow (In the Italian version)
- Jacques Berlioz as Le capitaine Sleptozoff (In the French version)
- Abel Jacquin as Il capitano Nikolsky / Le capitaine Nikolsky.
- Enrico Glori as Il mercante / Le marchand
- Alberto Sordi as Ciaruskin
- Amedeo Trilli as Ravic
- Vasco Cataldo
- Rolando Costantino
- Enrico Gozzo
- Wilma Grazia
- Mario Mari
- Mauprey
- Guglielmo Morresi
- Teodoro Pescara Pateras
- Gennaro Sabatano
- Giovanni Stupin
- Germana Vivian
- Cesare Zoppetti

== See also ==
- Princess Tarakanova (1910)
- Tarakanova (1930)
- Shadow of the Eagle (1950)
- The Rival of the Empress (1951)

== Bibliography ==
- Moliterno, Gino. The A to Z of Italian Cinema. Scarecrow Press, 2009.
