= A Wife in Danger =

1939 film

- Directed by: Max Neufeld
- Written by: Ferruccio Biancini; Alfredo Vanni
- Produced by: C.O. Barbieri
- Starring: Marie Glory; Antonio Centa; Carlo Lombardi
- Cinematography: Anchise Brizzi
- Edited by: Maria Rosada
- Music by: Alessandro Cicognini
- Production company: Astra Film
- Distributed by: ENIC
- Release date: 8 June 1939
- Running time: 87 minutes
- Country: Italy
- Language: Italian

A Wife in Danger (Italian: Una moglie in pericolo) is a 1939 Italian "white-telephones" comedy film directed by Max Neufeld and starring Marie Glory, Antonio Centa and Carlo Lombardi. It is a "White Telephone" film, shot at the Cinecittà Studios in Rome.

== Cast ==
- Marie Glory as Mary Arnold Verdier
- Antonio Centa as Giorgio De Martius
- Carlo Lombardi as Pietro Verdier
- Laura Solari as Michelina
- Guglielmo Barnabò as Luigi Arnold
- Sandra Ravel as Ilona, the friend of Luigi Arnold
- Afra Arrigoni Fantoni as Aunt Clementina
- Corrado De Cenzo as the Commissioner Melvet
- Vasco Creti as Professor Duval
- Bruno Calabretta as a detective
- Luigi Erminio D'Olivo as Boulanger
- Liana Del Balzo as an invitee to the wedding party
- Armando Garozzo as a detective
- Hella Kolniak as a traveller
- Alfredo Martinelli as Gaby's husband
- Silvia Melandri as Gaby
- Alfredo Menichelli as a friend from Budapest
- Lina Tartara Minora as Mary's maid
- Guido Notari as the auctioneer
- Giuseppe Pierozzi as the secretary
- Dina Romano as the housekeeper

== Bibliography ==
- Landy, Marcia. Fascism in Film: The Italian Commercial Cinema, 1931-1943. Princeton University Press, 2014.
