= The Three Wishes (1937 Italian film) =

1937 film

- Italian poster
- Directed by: Giorgio Ferroni; Kurt Gerron
- Written by: Gherardo Gherardi; Cesare Ludovici; Fritz Zeckendorf
- Produced by: Giulio Manenti
- Starring: Luisa Ferida; Antonio Centa; Leda Gloria
- Cinematography: Akos Farkas
- Edited by: Maria Rosada; Jan Teunissen
- Music by: Umberto Mancini
- Production company: Manenti Film
- Distributed by: Generalcine
- Release date: December 1937
- Running time: 78 minutes
- Country: Italy
- Language: Italian

The Three Wishes (Italian: I tre desideri) is a 1937 Italian "white-telephones" romantic comedy film directed by Giorgio Ferroni and Kurt Gerron and starring Luisa Ferida, Antonio Centa and Leda Gloria. It was shot at the Cinecittà Studios in Rome. The film's sets were designed by the art director Guido Fiorini. A separate Dutch version, The Three Wishes, was also made.

== Cast ==
- Luisa Ferida as Maria Lauri
- Antonio Centa as Renato Nardi
- Leda Gloria as Dora Corelli, la cantante
- Febo Mari as Il miliardario
- Camillo Pilotto as L'industriale Giovanni Fortini
- Enrico Glori as Ricciardi
- Franco Coop as Rossi, L'impresario teatrale
- Aldo Silvani as Compagni, il capo claque
- Olga Capri as La signora Toloni
- Miranda Bonansea as La piccola Anna
- Bruno Calabretta
- Luigi Erminio D'Olivo as Un giornalista
- Giovanni Ferrari
- Kurt Gerron as Il coreografo
- Guglielmo Morresi
- Giuseppe Pierozzi as Un giornalista
- Vera Poggioni
- Dina Romano as Annetta, la cameriera di Nardi

== Bibliography ==
- Poppi, Roberto. I registi: dal 1930 ai giorni nostri. Gremese Editore, 2002.
