= Cesare Giulio Viola =

Cesare Giulio Viola (26 November 1886 – 3 October 1958) was an Italian screenwriter. He was nominated for the Academy Award for Best Original Screenplay for his work in Shoeshine (1946).

== Selected filmography ==
- Luciano Serra, Pilot (1938)
- Naples Will Never Die (1939)
- First Love (1941)
- Laugh, Pagliacci (1943)
