= Shadow of the Eagle (1950 film) =

1950 film

- Directed by: Sidney Salkow
- Written by: Jacques Companéez (story); Doreen Montgomery; Hagar Wilde
- Produced by: Robert Garrett; Anthony Havelock-Allan; Dario Sabatello
- Starring: Richard Greene; Valentina Cortese; Greta Gynt
- Cinematography: Erwin Hillier
- Edited by: Peter Graham Scott
- Music by: Hans May
- Production companies: Dario Sabatello; Scalera Film; Sparta; Tuscania; Valiant Films
- Distributed by: Independent Film Distributors; Scalera Film
- Release date: 11 September 1950
- Running time: 93 minutes
- Countries: Italy; United Kingdom
- Language: English
- Budget: £128,500
- Box office: £55,000

Shadow of the Eagle is a 1950 British-Italian historical drama film directed by Sidney Salkow and starring Richard Greene, Valentina Cortese and Greta Gynt. It was written Doreen Montgomery and Hagar Wilde based on a story by Jacques Companéez. A separate Italian version The Rival of the Empress was released in 1951.

== Plot ==
During the 18th century the Empress of Russia Catherine the Great sends her lover Count Alexei Orloff to kidnap her rival for the throne, the pretender Elizabeth, Princess Tarakanova, from Venice. However, Orloff ends up falling in love with the Princess.

== Cast ==
- Richard Greene as Count Alexei Orloff
- Valentina Cortese as Elizabeth, Princess Tarakanova
- Greta Gynt as Countess Loradona Camponiello
- Binnie Barnes as Catherine, Empress of Russia
- Charles Goldner as General Korsakov
- Hugh French as Captain Sergei Nikolsky
- Walter Rilla as Prince Radziwill
- Dennis Vance as Vasska, Orloff's aide
- William Tubbs as Boris
- Cippi Valli as maid
- Dino Galvani as Russian Ambassador
- Ewan Roberts as ship's doctor
- A. De Leo as Polish guard
- Gianantonio Porcheddu as partisan

== Production ==
It was shot partly at Teddington Studios and partly on location in Italy. The film's art direction was by Wilfred Shingleton.

It was produced by Tony Havelock Allen who made it through his company Constellation Films. He said the movie "looked nice, had beautiful sets, but again I wasn’t pleased with it."

It was the first film from Independent Film Distributors, the company of the Woolf brothers.

== Reception ==
The Monthly Film Bulletin wrote: "Good fun though the film may be, it is a pity to see an independent producer of quality turning his hand to swashbuckling romance after the manner of Fairbanks and Flynn. Shadow of the Eagle is a period romance without the dash of the American model, the intensity or intellectual brilliance of Queen of Spades, or the tragedy of a Mayerling."

Picturegoer called the film: "Somewhat turgid," adding "To take the best things in this production first, one must praise the Venetian settings and the values of the production generally. Apart from these good points, the film is little more than a series of clichés, with a kind of Doug Fairbanks act from Richard Greene – though, admittedly, these gymnastic scenes are well done. "

In British Sound Films: The Studio Years 1928–1959 David Quinlan rated the film as "average", writing: "Potentially 'big' British film is little more than Greene schoolboy adventure."

== See also ==
- Princess Tarakanova (1910)
- Tarakanova (1930)
- Princess Tarakanova (1938)
- The Rival of the Empress (1951)

== Bibliography ==
- Richards, Jeffrey. Swordsmen of the Screen: From Douglas Fairbanks to Michael York. Routledge, 2014.
