= Antonio Centa =

Italian actor (1907–1979)

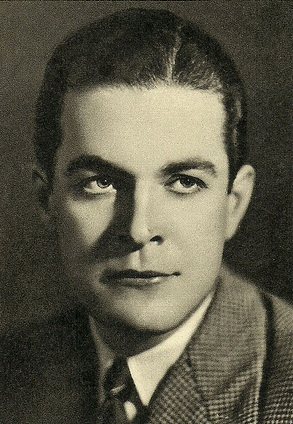
- Born: 10 August 1907; Maniago, Province of Pordenone, Italy
- Died: 19 April 1979 (aged 71); Rovigo, Italy
- Occupation: Actor

Antonio Centa (10 August 1907 – 19 April 1979) was an Italian film actor.

== Career ==
Born in Maniago, Province of Pordenone, Centa was among the most active and popular actors between the mid-1930s and 1943 (when the Italian film industry almost halted because of the war). He was especially popular with the female audience, and had critically acclaimed performances, notably in Renato Castellani's films A Pistol Shot and Zazà. After the war his success declined, and he gradually started to be cast in supporting roles.

== Filmography ==
Year	Title	Role	Notes
1936	But It's Nothing Serious	Grizzoffi	Uncredited
1936	Bayonet	Mario Verandi	
1936	The Countess of Parma	Il tenente Mario Ludovici	
1936	The Two Sergeants	Il luogotenente Carlo Duva / lIl colonnello Georges Masson	
1937	The Countess of Parma	Gino Vanni	
1937	Marcella	Oliviero	
1937	The Three Wishes	Renato Nardi	
1938	Princess Tarakanova	Il capitano Sleptozow	
1938	Arma bianca		
1938	Under the Southern Cross	Paolo	
1938	Battles in the Shadow	Mario	
1939	Who Are You?	Maurizio / l'attore Man Rowel	
1939	A Wife in Danger	Giorgio De Martius	
1939	The Castle Ball	Tenente Paolo Karinsky	
1940	Validità giorni dieci	Paolo Rubini	
1940	Tutto per la donna	Gianni	
1940	The Cavalier from Kruja	Stafano Andriani	
1940	Manovre d'amore	Il sottotenente Zilihay	
1941	Il pozzo dei miracoli	Stefano Klapka	
1941	Solitudine	Giovanni Fabiani	
1942	Headlights in the Fog	Carlo detto "Brillantina"	
1942	The Princess of Dreams	Il principe Goffredo Ardesiani	
1942	Cercasi bionda bella presenza	Giorgio	
1942	A Pistol Shot	Sergio Drutzky	
1942	Il ponte sull'infinito	Renato Forester	
1943	Gente dell'aria	Raimondo Sandri	
1943	I'll Always Love You	Diego	
1944	Zazà	Dufresne	
1946	Pian delle stelle		
1948	Assunta Spina	Federico Funelli	
1948	The Mysterious Rider	Antonio, fratello di Casanova	
1948	The Man with the Grey Glove	Max	
1949	The Glass Mountain	Gino	
1950	Fugitive Lady	Jack De Marco	
1951	The Rival of the Empress	Principe Rasiwill	
1951	Shadows on the Grand Canal	Stefano	
1952	Gli uomini non guardano il cielo	Segretario del papa	
1953	The Wages of Fear	Camp Chief	
1954	Mizar (Sabotaggio in mare)	Dottor Vargas	
1961	Laura nuda	Sandro - il padre di Laura	
1961	A Difficult Life	Carlo - Elena's Friend	
1968	The Black Sheep	Commendator Mannocchi	
1969	Lo stato d'assedio	Lorenzo's father	
1969	Youth March	Cavallari	(final film role)
