= Giuseppe Fatigati =

Italian film editor and producer

- Born: 20 September 1906; Terracina, Italy
- Died: 9 September 1975 (aged 68); Rome, Italy
- Occupations: Film editor, producer

Giuseppe Fatigati (20 September 1906 – 9 September 1975) was an Italian film editor, producer and director.

== Life and career ==
Born in Terracina, Latina, Fatigati began his career as a film editor in the early 1930s, collaborating in films directed by Mario Camerini, Gennaro Righelli and Guido Brignone. Besides serving as assistant director in several of the films he edited, Fatigati sometimes also worked as a film director, being renowned for the musical comedy Voglio bene soltanto a te, starring Beniamino Gigli. From the second half of the 1940s onwards, Fatigati focused on production, and he financed some films directed by Luigi Comencini, Riccardo Freda, Goffredo Alessandrini and Guido Brignone, among others. His last works were the productions of two films directed by Mario Imperoli and starring Gloria Guida, Monika and Blue Jeans.

== Selected filmography ==
- Figaro and His Great Day (1931)
- The Devil's Lantern (1931)
- The Last Adventure (1932)
- The Wedding March (1934)
- Beggar's Wedding (1936)
- Marcella (1937)
- They've Kidnapped a Man (1938)
- For Men Only (1938)
- The Castle Ball (1939)
- Kean (1940)
- Laugh, Pagliacci (1943)
- Buried Alive (1949)
