= The Princess of Dreams =

1942 film

- Directed by: Maria Teresa Ricci; Roberto Savarese
- Written by: Luciana Peverelli; Maria Teresa Ricci; Roberto Savarese
- Produced by: Vittorio Musy Glori
- Starring: Irasema Dilián; Antonio Centa; Maria Melato
- Cinematography: Ugo Lombardi
- Edited by: Ines Donarelli
- Music by: Ezio Carabella
- Production company: Fono Roma
- Distributed by: Artisti Associati
- Release date: 11 August 1942
- Running time: 85 minutes
- Country: Italy
- Language: Italian

The Princess of Dreams (Italian: La principessa del sogno) is a 1942 Italian romance film directed by Maria Teresa Ricci and Roberto Savarese and starring Irasema Dilián, Antonio Centa and Maria Melato. It was shot at the Fert Studios in Turin. The film's sets were designed by the art director Luigi Ricci.

== Cast ==
- Irasema Dilián as Elisabetta
- Antonio Centa as Il principe Goffredo Ardesiani
- Maria Melato as Margot
- Annibale Betrone as Il nonno di Goffredo
- Olga Solbelli as Clotilde - la direttrice dell' orfanotrofio
- Jone Frigerio as La madre di Goffredo
- Gina Sammarco as La cantante lirica
- Carlo Lombardi as Carlo
- Annette Ciarli as Una domestica dell' orfanotrofio
- Gioia Collei as Mirka
- Lina Tartara Minora as Francesca - la domestica della cantante
- Emilio Petacci as Giovanni - il maggiordomo
- Alessandra Adari as Un'altra amica della cantante lirica
- Nicola Maldacea as Il cantante Tonti
- Lydia Johnson as Un'altra amica della cantante lirica
- Liana Del Balzo as Una amica della cantante lirica

== Bibliography ==
- Mancini, Elaine. Struggles of the Italian film industry during fascism, 1930-1935. UMI Research Press, 1985.
- Savio, Francesco. Ma l'amore no: realismo, formalismo, propaganda e telefoni bianchi nel cinema italiano di regime (1930-1943). Sonzogno, 1975.
