= Headlights in the Fog =

1942 film

- Directed by: Gianni Franciolini
- Written by: Corrado Alvaro; Edoardo Anton; Rinaldo Dal Fabbro; Oreste Gasperini; Giuseppe Mangione; Alberto Pozzetti; Giuseppe Zucca
- Produced by: Vincenzo Genesi
- Starring: Fosco Giachetti; Luisa Ferida; Antonio Centa; Mariella Lotti
- Cinematography: Aldo Tonti
- Edited by: Mario Serandrei
- Music by: Enzo Masetti
- Production company: Fauno Film
- Distributed by: ICI
- Release date: 15 February 1942
- Running time: 95 minutes
- Country: Italy
- Language: Italian

Headlights in the Fog (Italian: Fari nella nebbia) is a 1942 Italian drama film directed by Gianni Franciolini and starring Fosco Giachetti, Luisa Ferida and Antonio Centa. The film's art direction was by Camillo Del Signore. It was made at the Palatino Studios in Rome and on location in Piedmont and Liguria.

The film follows the lives of a group of truck drivers. It is considered to be part of the development of Neorealism, which emerged around this time.

== Cast ==
- Fosco Giachetti as Cesare
- Luisa Ferida as Piera
- Antonio Centa as Carlo detto "Brillantina"
- Mariella Lotti as Anna
- Mario Siletti as Gianni
- Lauro Gazzolo as Egisto
- Carlo Lombardi as Filippo
- Nelly Corradi as Maria
- Lia Orlandini as Evelina
- Dhia Cristiani as Gemma
- Arturo Bragaglia as Un ciabattino
- Loris Gizzi as Rico
- Massimo Turci as Il piccolo Ninetto

== Bibliography ==
- Gundle, Stephen. Mussolini's Dream Factory: Film Stardom in Fascist Italy. Berghahn Books, 2013.
