= Jacopo Comin =

Italian film producer, writer, and director

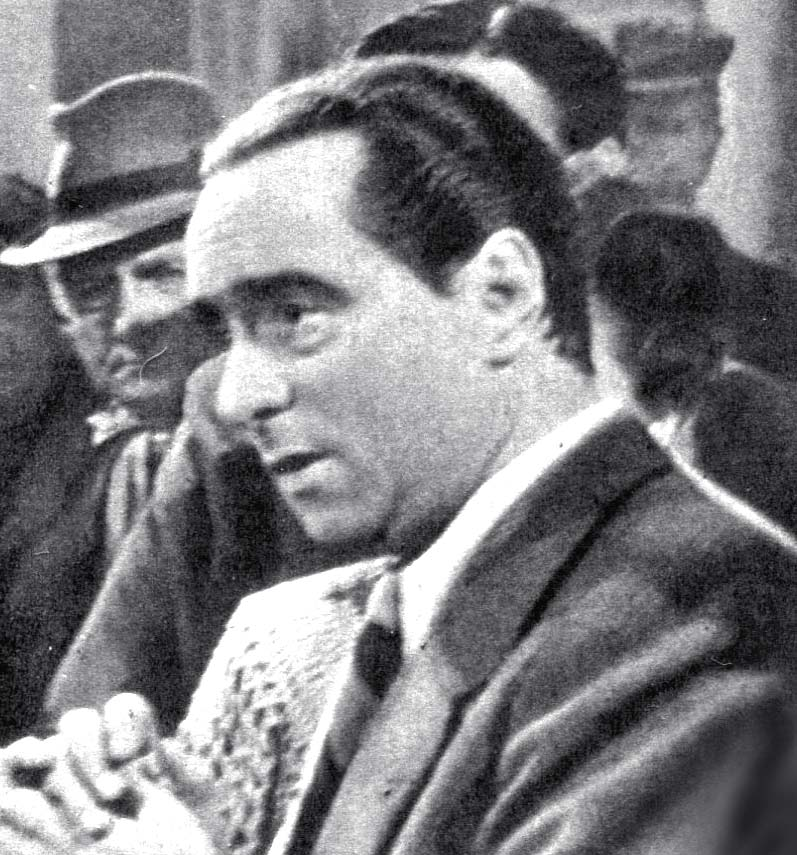
Comin-cinema 1942

Jacopo Comin (1901–1973) was an Italian film producer, writer, and director.

== Selected filmography ==
- Summer Storm (1949)
- The Rival of the Empress (1951)
- Without a Flag (1951)
