= Guido Notari =

Italian actor and radio presenter (1893–1957)

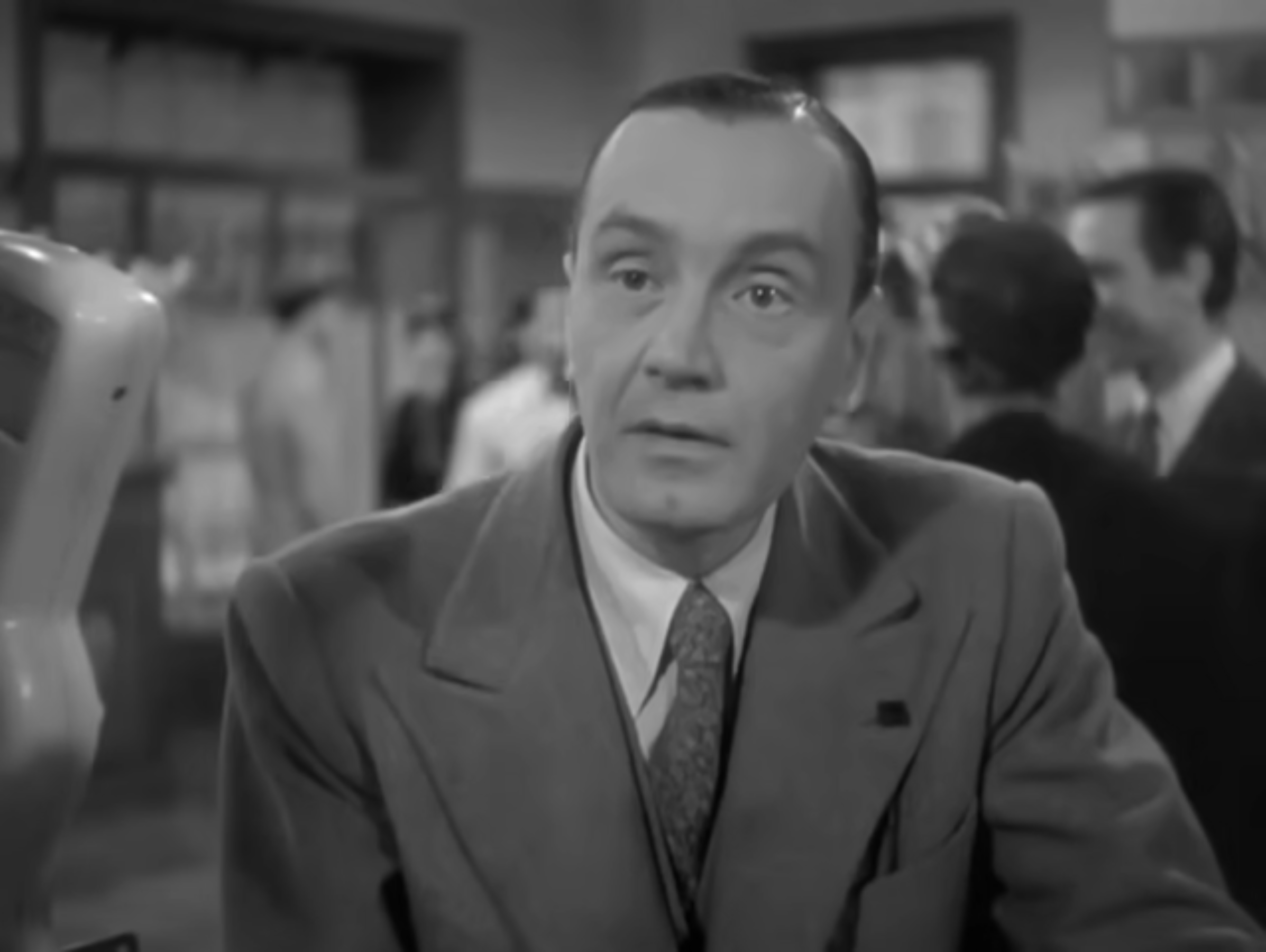
- Notari in Love Story (1942)
- Born: 10 May 1893; Asti, Kingdom of Italy
- Died: 21 January 1957 (aged 63); Rome, Italy
- Occupation: Actor
- Years active: 1939–1956

Guido Notari (10 May 1893 – 21 January 1957) was an Italian actor and radio presenter. He appeared in more than fifty films from 1939 to 1956.

== Filmography ==
Year	Title	Role	Notes
1939	I, His Father	Roberto	
1939	A Wife in Danger	Il banditore all'asta	
1939	The Dream of Butterfly		
1939	Piccolo hotel	Paolo Holber	
1939	In the Country Fell a Star	Il suocero di Margaret	
1939	La conquista dell'aria		
1939	Ballo al castello	Director of the Theatre	
1940	Wealth Without a Future	Il segretario	
1940	Manon Lescaut		
1940	Gli ultimi della strada	Il commadante	
1940	Mare	L'ubriaco	
1940	Ecco la radio!		
1940	Incanto di mezzanotte	Il conte Fabrizio Velasco	
1940	The Siege of the Alcazar	Il maggiore Villanova	
1940	La danza dei milioni	Walter	
1940	La zia smemorata	Il commissario	
1941	Notte di fortuna		
1941	Don Buonaparte	Il generale	
1942	Yes, Madam	Pescatori, Il medico	
1942	Vertigine	Il presentatore all "Grande Festa Musicale"	
1942	Giarabub	Il maggiore Squillace	
1942	Soltanto un bacio	Il direttore del quotidiano "La Voce"	
1942	Bengasi	Il podestà italiano a Bengasi	
1942	Love Story	Ing. Federico Ferreri	
1942	Gioco pericoloso	L'avvocato	
1942	M.A.S.	L'amiraglio	
1942	Signorinette		
1942	Piazza San Sepolcro		
1943	Il nemico	Il colonnello Erik Korsen	
1943	Spie fra le eliche	Il direttore dell'officine "Stella"	
1943	Incontri di notte	Il commissario	
1943	Short Circuit	Il professore Muller	
1943	Gente dell'aria	Il maggiore Rossi-Chiari	
1943	Grattacieli	Robert Wingham	
1944	Resurrection	Scembok	
1945	The Ten Commandments		
1945	La casa senza tempo	Antonio	
1945	Fuga nella tempesta		
1946	Before Him All Rome Trembled	Doctor	
1947	Dove sta Zaza?		
1948	Cab Number 13		
1948	Cuore		
1948	Veglia nella notte		
1948	Gli uomini sono nemici		
1948	Il cavaliere misterioso	Il conte Ipatieff	
1948	Fantasmi del mare	Comandante Andrea Altesi	Voice, Uncredited
1949	Anthony of Padua	Avvocato difensore	
1949	Genoveffa di Brabante	duca di Brabante	
1951	The Rival of the Empress	Vaska	
1951	Senza bandiera		
1951	I due derelitti	Raimondo	
1952	Il tallone di Achille	Prof. Francese	
1954	Disonorata - Senza colpa	L'autore Victor-Hugo Felluan	
1956	Helen of Troy	Nestor	(final film role)
