= Roberto Savarese =

Italian film director

- Born: 6 August 1910; Rome, Lazio; Italy
- Died: 1 February 1996 (aged 85); Rome, Lazio, Italy
- Occupations: Writer, Director
- Years active: 1940–1961 (film)

Roberto Savarese (1910–1996) was an Italian screenwriter and film director. He also worked as an assistant or second unit director, as he did on Henri-Georges Clouzot's The Wages of Fear in 1953.

== Selected filmography ==
- The Princess of Dreams (1942)
- Lascia cantare il cuore (1943)
- Seven Years of Happiness (1943)
- The Fighting Men (1950)
- Mamma Mia, What an Impression! (1951)
- The Wages of Fear (1953)
- Dinanzi a noi il cielo (1957)
- Battaglie sui mari: 1940-1945 (1961)

== Bibliography ==
- Chiti, Roberto & Poppi, Roberto. Dizionario del cinema italiano: Dal 1945 al 1959. Gremese Editore, 1991.
- Lloyd, Christopher. Henri-Georges Clouzot: French Film Directors. Manchester University Press, 2007.
