= Fortunella (film) =

- Directed by: Eduardo De Filippo
- Written by: Federico Fellini; Eduardo De Filippo; Ennio Flaiano; Tullio Pinelli
- Starring: Giulietta Masina
- Cinematography: Aldo Tonti
- Edited by: Leo Catozzo
- Music by: Nino Rota
- Release date: 1958
- Running time: 100 min.
- Country: Italy
- Language: Italian

Fortunella is a 1958 Italian comedy film directed by Eduardo De Filippo, with script by Federico Fellini, among others.

== Plot ==
Nanda Diotallevi, known as Fortunella, is a poor girl who lives in the Roman second-hand dealers' district, and is the lover of one of these, Peppino. To save him she goes to prison, taking responsibility for a crime of receiving stolen goods he committed, but when she is released she learns that Peppino lives with another woman, Amelia: after a scene she leaves the treacherous man. In the vicissitudes of her troubled existence, Fortunella is supported by an illusion, which is her reason for living: she is in fact convinced that she is the illegitimate daughter of Prince Guidobaldi, whose palace is located right in her neighborhood. She remembers being picked up by the prince when she was a child, which gives her a fantastic story about herself. Fortunella meets one day a wandering professor, Golfiero Paganica, who promises her help after hearing her story. Together with the girl he joins a company of actors who perform under a large tent on the banks of the Tiber, but his incontinence causes a series of accidents that ruin the performance. Fortunella reunites with Peppino, but she learns shortly after that Golfiero is hospitalized: the vagabond professor soon dies and leaves Fortunella a dilapidated chalet as an inheritance. Prince Guidobaldi, who was linked by friendship to Golfiero and is his executor, calls Fortunella to the palace. The girl plucks up courage and tells the prince her story, but the old gentleman is able to establish that, during the time period to which the story refers, he was in India. Fortunella is disappointed and embittered, but she is determined to break away from Peppino forever. She will remain with the actors, to be able to represent on stage that part of the princess that she had deluded herself was entitled to in her life. (Translated from Italian)

== Cast ==
- Giulietta Masina: Nanda Diotallevi, aka 'Fortunella'
- Alberto Sordi: Peppino
- Paul Douglas: Professor Golfiero Paganica
- Eduardo De Filippo: Head of the Theater Company
- Piera Arico: Katya
- Nando Bruno: The American
- Guido Celano: The Doorman
- Carlo Dapporto: The Actor
- Carlo Delle Piane: Riccardino
- Enrico Glori: The Gambler
- Franca Marzi: Amelia
- Mimmo Poli: Orso Bruno
- Aldo Silvani: Guidobaldi

== Music ==
The film's score, composed by Nino Rota, notably contains three memorable motifs, two of which would be reused in Rota's most famous film compositions: La Dolce Vita (1960) and The Godfather (1972). Another prominent motif had already been used in another Rota composition, Il Bidone (1955).

=== 45th Academy Awards ===
At the 45th Academy Awards, Nino Rota's score for The Godfather was removed at the last minute from the list of nominees for Best Original Score when it was discovered that the melody in "Speak Softly Love (Love Theme from The Godfather)" had previously been used in Fortunella.
