= Peddlin' in Society =

1946 film

- Directed by: Gennaro Righelli
- Written by: Gennaro Righelli; Vittorio Calvino; Vittorio De Sica; Fabrizio Sarazani; Pietro Solari; Nicola Fausto Neroni
- Starring: Anna Magnani; Vittorio De Sica
- Cinematography: Aldo Tonti
- Edited by: Gabriele Varriale
- Music by: Cesare A. Bixio; Felice Montagnini
- Release date: 1946
- Country: Italy
- Language: Italian

Peddlin' in Society (Italian: Abbasso la ricchezza!), also known as Down With Riches!, is a 1946 Italian romantic drama film co-written and directed by Gennaro Righelli. It is a loose sequel to the 1945 film Down with Misery by the same director and also starring Magnani.

== Plot ==
Street market peddler Gioconda Perfetti becomes rich and moves into a grand house. But, except for a sympathetic Count, everyone she encounters robs or cheats her and she ends up back in the street market.

== Cast ==
- Anna Magnani as Gioconda Perfetti
- Vittorio De Sica as Count Ghirani
- Virgilio Riento as Don Nicola
- Laura Gore as Anna
- Zora Piazza as Lucia Perfetti
- John Garson as Lucky Brandy
- Lauro Gazzolo as Commendator Bardacò
- Giuseppe Porelli as Bonifazio
- Vittorio Mottini as Nino
- Galeazzo Benti as Rorò di Torretia
- Vito Annichiarico as Little Tranquillo
- Domenico Gambino as Tranquillo's Uncle
- Checco Durante as Greengrocer
- Anita Durante as Caterina
- Dina Romano as Marquise of Mendoza
- Enrico Glori as Commissioner
- Edda Soligo as Zefira
- Maria Grazia Francia

== Bibliography ==
- Burke, Frank. A Companion to Italian Cinema. John Wiley & Sons, 2017.
