= Massimo Serato =

Italian actor

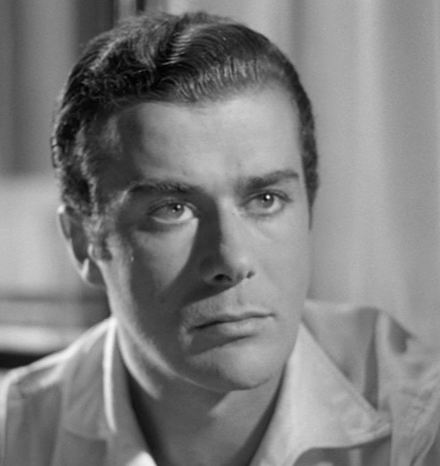
- Serato in the movie Domenica d'agosto (1950)
- Born: Giuseppe Segato; 31 May 1917; Oderzo, Veneto, Kingdom of Italy
- Died: 22 December 1989 (aged 72); Rome, Italy
- Years active: 1938–1989
- Partner: Anna Magnani
- Children: 1

Massimo Serato (born Giuseppe Segato; 31 May 1917 – 22 December 1989) was an Italian film actor with a career spanning over 40 years.

== Biography ==
Serato was born in Oderzo, Veneto, Italy and started appearing in films in 1938. He played leading roles in several historical dramas and sword-and-sandal epics, mainly Italian, as well as roles in major international films. His notable appearances include Piccolo mondo antico (1941), The Naked Maja (1958), David and Goliath (1960), The Loves of Hercules (1960), El Cid (1961), 55 Days at Peking (1963) Camille 2000 (1969) and Don't Look Now (1973). In 1947 he won a Nastro d'Argento for Best Supporting Actor for his performance in the neorealist war-drama film The Sun Still Rises.

He had an affair with the actress Anna Magnani who bore him a son, Luca, whom she affectionately called Cellino. Luca contracted polio at an early age; "In time he was able to walk with steel braces but [he] spent much of his time in a wheelchair."

Serato died in Rome in 1989.

== Selected filmography ==
- Inventiamo l'amore (1938) − Un altro giocatore nella sala da biliardo
- Le Père Lebonnard (1939) − Un giovanetto al ballo (uncredited)
- L'ispettore Vargas (1940)
- Piccolo mondo antico (1941) − Franco Maironi
- Due cuori sotto sequestro (1941) − Il compositore
- L'amore canta (1941) − Alberto
- L'uomo venuto dal mare (1942) − Il marinaio
- I sette peccati (1942) − Mario Venier
- Luisa Sanfelice (1942) − Ferdinando Ferri
- Giacomo the Idealist (1943) − Giacomo Lanzavecchia
- The Materassi Sisters (1944) − Remo, il nipote
- In High Places (1945) − Giorgio Zanetti
- The Sun Still Rises (1946) − Major Heinrich
- Sangue a Ca' Foscari (1946) − cavaliere della Rosa
- L'apocalisse (1947)
- The Courier of the King (1947) − Maurice Croisenois
- La revanche de Baccarat (1947)
- The Lady of the Camellias (1947) − Alexandre Dumas fils (prologue)
- Rocambole (1947)
- Il principe ribelle (1947) − Francesco di Sant'Agata
- I cavalieri dalle maschere nere (1948) − Il contino de la Motte
- The Dance of Death (1948) − Stéphane / Stefano
- The Monastery of Santa Chiara (1949) − Rudolf, ufficiale delle SS
- Il mondo vuole così (1949) − Alberto
- The Pirates of Capri (1949) − Baron Holstein
- Marechiaro (1949) − Luca Salvatori
- Flying Squadron (1949) − Ufficiale D'aviazione
- Sunday in August (1950) − Roberto
- Fugitive Lady (1950) − Jim West
- The Thief of Venice (1950) − Il grande inquisitore Garbia
- The Rival of the Empress (1951) − Orloff − Italian language version (voice)
- Love and Blood (1951) − Peppuccio detto Peppe
- Shadows Over Naples (1951) − Peppuccio
- Tragic Spell (1951) − Berto
- Without a Flag (1951) − Leutnant Morassi
- I due derelitti (1951) − Ramon
- Anita Garibaldi (1952) − (uncredited)
- Milady and the Musketeers (1952) − Comte de Rochefort
- La figlia del diavolo (1952) − Adolfo Santagata
- Red Love (1952) − Simone Sole
- The Merchant of Venice (1953) − Antonio
- I Piombi di Venezia (1953) − Orsenigo
- Gioventù alla sbarra (1953) − Gigi
- Eager to Live (1953) − Massimo Fontana
- The Man from Cairo (1953) − Basil Constantine
- Lucrèce Borgia (1953) − Alfonso of Aragon
- The Story of William Tell (1953) − Hermann Gessler
- Il Conte di Sant'Elmo (1953) − Conte di Sant'Elmo
- Public Opinion (1954) − Massimo Gorini
- Pietà per chi cade (1954) − Livio Vanini
- Madame du Barry (1954) − Choiseul
- Loves of Three Queens (1954) − Paride (segment: The Face That Launched a Thousand Ships)
- L'eterna femmina (1954)
- Foglio di via (1954) − Andrea
- Cartouche (1955) − Henri de Vauboranche
- The Widow (1955) − Vittorio
- Il falco d'oro (1955) − Massimo Montefalco
- Il piccolo vetraio (1955) − barone de la Motte
- Mermaid of Naples (1956) − Salvatore Aiello
- Tormento d'amore (1956) − Pietro Martínez
- Supreme Confession (1956) − Marco Neri
- La trovatella di Milano (1956)
- Peppino, le modelle e chella là (1957) − Carlo Rosani
- La grande ombra (1957) − Franco Donati
- The Silent Enemy (1958) − Forzellini
- Slave Women of Corinth (1958) − Quinto Rufo
- The Naked Maja (1958) − Conte Rodrigo Sanchez
- Captain Falcon (1958) − Baron Oddo di Serra
- The Sword and the Cross (1958) − Anan
- Cavalier in Devil's Castle (1959) − Capitano Ugone di Collefeltro
- Tunis Top Secret (1959) − Nikos
- The Magistrate (1959) − Ugo
- The Pirate and the Slave Girl (1959) − Roberto Diego
- David and Goliath (1960) − Abner
- The Loves of Hercules (1960) − Licos
- Queen of the Pirates (1960) − Cesare di Santacroce
- Ti aspetterò all'inferno (1960) − Al
- Femmine di lusso (1960) − Sicilian Nobleman
- Constantine and the Cross (1961) − Maxentius
- El Cid (1961) − Fanez
- Pontius Pilate (1962) −Nicodemus
- Venus Against the Son of Hercules (1962) − Antarus
- The Secret Mark of D'Artagnan (1962) − Cardinal Richelieu
- Hypnosis (1962) − Georg von Cramer
- The Invincible Masked Rider (1963) − Don Rodrigo
- 55 Days at Peking (1963) − Menotti Garibaldi
- Samson and the Slave Queen (1963) − Garcia de Higuera
- Goliath and the Rebel Slave (1963) − Marcius
- Gli invincibili sette (1963) − Axel
- Brennus, Enemy of Rome (1963) − Marcus Furius Camillus
- Jacob and Esau (1963) − Ismaele − Ishmael
- Full Hearts and Empty Pockets (1964) − Corbelli, Editor−in−chief
- Samson vs. the Giant King (1964) − Czar Nicola Nicolajevic
- Hero of Rome (1964) − Lucius Tarquinius Superbus
- The Lion of Thebes (1964) − Tutmes
- Gunmen of the Rio Grande (1964) − Leo
- Gladiators Seven (1964) − Baxo
- La Celestina P... R... (1965) − Marcello
- Challenge of the Gladiator (1965) − Senator Lucio Quintilio
- 100.000 dollari per Ringo (1965) − Guy
- The 10th Victim (1965) − Lawyer Rossi
- Super Seven Calling Cairo (1965) − Alex
- Operation Yellow Viper (1966)
- The Almost Perfect Crime (1966) − Preston
- Wild, Wild Planet (1966) − Mr. Nurmi
- The Lost Woman (1966) − D. Rafael Valcálcer
- 00/ciak operazione mondo (1966)
- The Honey Pot (1967) − The Pretender (scenes deleted)
- The Strange Night (1967) − ing. Pariante
- The Magnificent Texan (1967) − Blackie Stark
- È stato bello amarti (1968) − Luca
- Catch as Catch Can (1968) − Agent
- Camille 2000 (1969) − Armand's father
- L'amore breve (1969) − Crusich
- The Naughty Cheerleader (1970) − Capitano di Montecucculi
- The Gamblers (1970) − Del Isolla
- Il divorzio (1970) − Mario Gherardi
- Cloud of Dust... Cry of Death... Sartana Is Coming (1970) − Sheriff Jim Manassas
- Edipeon (1970)
- Lady Caliph (1970) − L'industriale fallito
- Historia de una traición (1971) − Hugo
- Il ritorno del gladiatore più forte del mondo (1971) − Caio Appio Quintilliano
- Dead Men Ride (1971) − Emiliano
- Il sergente Klems (1971) − French General
- Who Killed the Prosecutor and Why? (1972) − Uncle Fifi
- Un apprezzato professionista di sicuro avvenire (1972) − Bishop
- Beau Masque (1972) − Valério
- Number one (1973) − Mino Cattani
- Women in Cell Block 7 (1973) − Prison Director
- Don't Look Now (1973) − Bishop Barbarrigo
- Salvo D'Acquisto (1974) − Halder
- Autopsy (1975) − Gianni Sanna
- Cattivi pensieri (1976) − Carlo Bocconi
- Ladies' Doctor (1977) − Doctor Guido Lo Bianco
- Convoy Busters (1978) − Degan
- The Bloodstained Shadow (1978) − Count Pedrazzi
- The Humanoid (1979) − Great Brother
- Killer Nun (1979) − Dr. Poirret
- Eden no sono (1980) − Alessandra's Father
- Estigma (1980)
- Pin il monello (1982)
- Via degli specchi (1983) − Councillor Bianchi
- Nana (1983) − Faucherie
- Il ragazzo di campagna (1984) − Rower
- Saving Grace (1986) − Monsignor Betti
- Le lunghe ombre (1987)
- 32 dicembre (1988) − Ferruccio, il fidanzato (segment "La gialla farfalla")
- Singolo (1989)
- Fratelli d'Italia (1989)
- Viaggio di nozze in giallo (1990)
- L'avvoltoio può attendere (1991) − Prince (final film role)
