= Alda Borelli =

Italian stage and cinema actress

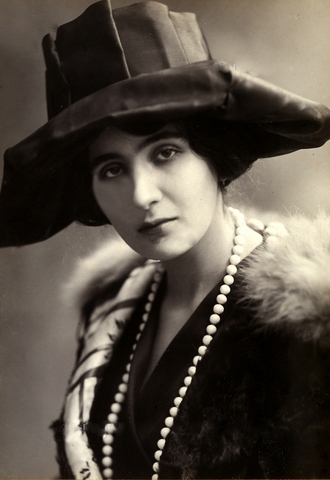
- Alda Borelli in 1922
- Born: 4 November 1879
- Died: 25 May 1964 (aged 84)
- Occupations: Stage and cinema actress
- Notable work: Played Beatrice in Percy Bysshe Shelley's The Cenci

Alda Borelli (4 November 1879 - 25 May 1964) was an Italian stage and cinema actress. She was the sister of Lyda Borelli, Borelli was active in the era of silent film but is best known for her stage work.

In 1922, she played Beatrice in an Italian translation of Percy Bysshe Shelley's The Cenci.
