= A Pistol Shot (1942 film) =

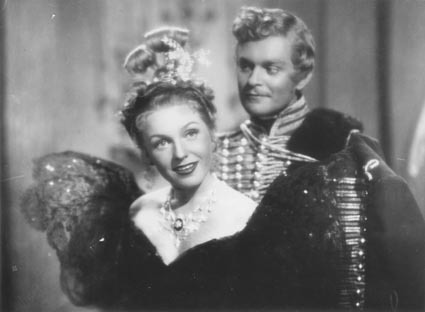
- Still with Assia Norris and Antonio Centa
- Directed by: Renato Castellani
- Written by: Alexander Pushkin (story); Alberto Moravia; Mario Soldati; Corrado Pavolini; Mario Bonfantini; Renato Castellani
- Starring: Assia Noris; Fosco Giachetti; Antonio Centa; Rubi Dalma
- Cinematography: Massimo Terzano
- Edited by: Mario Serandrei
- Music by: Vincenzo Tommasini
- Production company: Lux Film
- Distributed by: Lux Film
- Release date: 31 August 1942
- Running time: 90 minutes
- Country: Italy
- Language: Italian

A Pistol Shot (Italian: Un colpo di pistola) is a 1942 Italian historical drama film directed by Renato Castellani and starring Assia Noris, Fosco Giachetti, and Antonio Centa. The film was shot at the Palatino Studios in Rome with sets designed by the art director Gino Brosio. It belongs to the movies of the calligrafismo style. The film is an adaptation of Alexandr Pushkin's short story The Shot (Pushkin), published in 1831.

== Synopsis ==
In Nineteenth century Russia, two men fight a duel over a woman.

== Partial cast ==
- Assia Noris as Mascia
- Fosco Giachetti as Andrea
- Antonio Centa as Sergio
- Rubi Dalma as zia di Mascia
- Anna Capodaglio as la governante
- Renato Cialente as Gerardo De Valmont
- Mimì Dugini as Antonietta
- Romolo Costa as Il Generale
- Saro Urzì as Uno Dei Servitori Alla Scampagnata

== Bibliography ==
- Gundle, Stephen. Mussolini's Dream Factory: Film Stardom in Fascist Italy. Berghahn Books, 2013.
