= Maria Melato =

Italian actress (1885–1950)

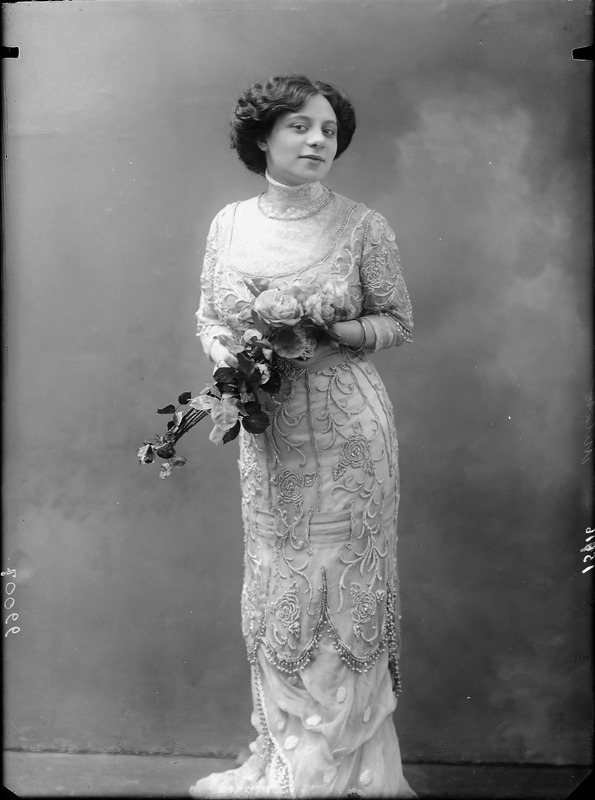
- Melato by Mario Nunes Vais
- Born: 16 October 1885; Reggio Emilia, Kingdom of Italy
- Died: 24 August 1950 (aged 64); Forte dei Marmi, Tuscany, Italy
- Occupation: Actress
- Years active: 1905–1950
- Children: 1

Maria Melato (16 October 1885 – 24 August 1950) was an Italian actress of the stage, screen, and radio.

== Early life ==
Maria Melato was born in Reggio Emilia on 16 October 1885, the daughter of Silvio Melato and Elisa Friggieri. Her father was a fencing master and cavalry officer. Her mother traveled with Melato during her theatrical career.

== Career ==
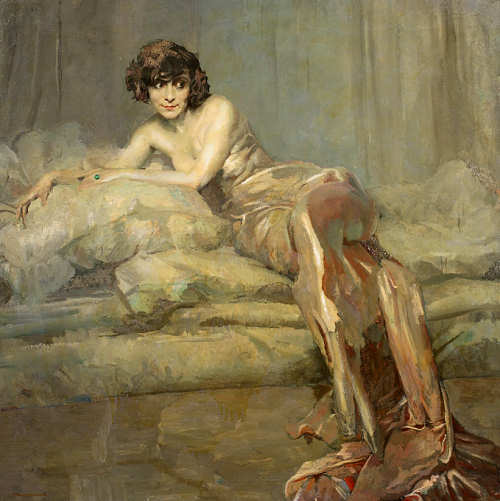
Portrait of Maria Melato, by Giuseppe Amisani

Melato began acting as a young woman. She joined the troupe of Irma Gramatica in about 1905, and found her first acclaim in 1908, substituting for Gramatica in Milan. From 1909 to 1921 she worked with director Virgilio Talli in the Compagnia Drammatica Italiana. "She seems to play as if acting was not the exciting, soul-wracking thing that some of its critics would have it, but a sober duty and a simple pleasure," noted one critic of the day.

She started her own company in 1921. She toured with her company in South America in the 1920s. In the 1930s she worked with the National Institute of Ancient Drama on staging Iphigenia in Tauris by Euripides and Women of Trachis by Sophocles, at Syracuse. In 1935 she toured through Sicily, Tripoli, and Benghazi, then returned to Latin America in 1939. During World War II she lost a hundred trunks of costumes, props, and personal possessions when a warehouse was destroyed by bombs. She worked in radio after the war.

Melato appeared in ten films: Il ritorno (1914), Anna Karenina (1917), Le due Marie (1918), Il volo degli aironi (1920), Il trittico dell'amore (1920), Le due esistenze (1920), The Princess of Dreams (1942), Redemption (1943 film) (1943), In High Places (1945), and Il fabbro del convento (1945).

== Personal life ==
Maria Melato had a son, Luciano, born in 1909. She died in 1950 at Forte dei Marmi, from injuries sustained in a fall from a train, aged 64 years. From 1951 to 1965, there was a Maria Melato Festival in Reggio Emilia, and a prize for amateur dramatic clubs in the comune.

Her papers are archived at the Panizzi Library in Reggio Emilia. There is a street named Via Maria Melato in Rome, and in Reggio Emilia, and a bronze bust of Melato, by artist Michele Vedani, in the public gardens of the latter city.
