= 1984 in Italian television =

This is a list of Italian television related events from 1984.

== Events ==
In 1984, with the purchase of Rete 4 by Silvio Berlusconi, the age of RAI-Finiinvest duopoly began for Italian television. Fininvest also wins the legal battle for the right to broadcast on a national scale, thanks to the support of Prime Minister Bettino Craxi. In the new situation, even the state television increasingly follows the logic of commercial one, inserting advertising within the programs and focusing on entertainment rather than service programs.

=== RAI ===
- 15 January : debut of Televideo, the RAI teletext service.
- 26 January : Romano Prodi, president of IRI (RAI's shareholder company) refuses to endorse the list of new members of the state TV's board of directors. The old board of directors is extended till 1987.
- 2 February: a union protest of the Cornigliano metalworkers troubles the opening night of the Sanremo Festival. The host Pippo Baudo allows some activists to go on the stage and to read a press release. The next evening, during the performance of the band Queen as guest stars, Freddie Mercury sings designedly with the phone far from his mouth, revealing the playback. The contest is won by Albano and Romina with Ci sarà.
- 28 February: the RAI Board of Directors (with three votes against) grants Raffaella Carrà 4 and a half billion lire (plus one and a half billion for the choreographer Sergio Japino, her mate) in exchange for a three-year exclusivity, after the soubrette had received tempting offers from Fininvest. The pharaonic contract aroused criticism in public opinion and parliamentary questions; Prime Minister Bettino Craxi expresses his disapproval and summons RAI President Sergio Zavoli.
- 9 March: first collaboration between Italian radio and television; while RAI 3 broadcasts Romeo and Juliet, the first episode of BBC Television Shakespeare, in a dubbed version, on Radio 3 the original one in English is aired.
- 3 July: RAI replaces the traditional telephone interviews to measure audiences with the "meter", a device automatically recording the programs seen on the TV sets of a sample of households. The reliability of the new system is harshly criticized by private television, so for three years RAI did not return its results.

=== Private channel ===
- The two Italian associations of private radios and televisions (FIERTI e FIEL) merges in the FRT (Federazione Radio Televisioni).
- 19 January : Silvio Berlusconi is sentenced to two months by the magistrate of Genoa, for violating the law that limits private TV to the local area; 24 July the magistrate of Rome issues a similar sentence against both Canale 5 and Rete 4. Those rulings has no practical effect.
- 2 April : birth of the musical channel Videomusic.
- 30 May: for the first time, Canale 5 broadcasts the Telegatto award ceremony, hosted by Mike Bongiorno.
- 27 August: Mondadori sold Rete 4 to Fininvest for 150 billion liras, because the heavy indebtedness; Rete 4 becomes a channel aimed at the female audience. Silvio Berlusconi obtains the virtual monopoly of Italian private television.
- 16 October: following an appeal by an association of local TV stations, the magistrates of Rome, Turin and Pescara seized the repeaters allowing Fininvest to broadcast on a national scale. The company responds by ceasing broadcasts in the three regions and mobilizing the public, street demonstrations are also held, with the slogan "We want the Smurfs back".
- 20 October: Prime Minister Bettino Craxi, with an emergency decree (the so-called "Berlusconi-decree"), authorizes the networks Finivest to broadcast on a national scale. To sign the decree, Craxi imnterrumps an official visit in England.
- 28 November: Italian parliament rejects the Berlusconi decree. A new blackout of the Fininvest networks in Rome and Turin follows. On 6 December, the decree is reiterated by the government, and approved by parliament on the 12th.

== Awards ==
1. Telegatto Award, for the season 1983–1984.

- Woman of the year: Raffaella Carrà.
- Best show: Pronto, Raffaella?
- Best TV movie: La piovra.
- Best serial: Dallas and Hill Street Blues
- Best quiz: Loretta Goggi in quiz, Superflash.
- Best game show: M’ama non m’ama; OK il prezzo è giusto!;Test
- Best variety: Bene, bravi, bis; Drive In; Fascination; Premiatissima; Ric e Gian folies; Risatissima
- Best talk show: Aboccaperta, Maurizio Costanzo show
- Best educational: Quark.
- Best magazine: Italia sera.
- Best music show: Dee Jay television.
- Best sport magazine: Record, Super Record, o, Caccia al 13, Il processo del lunedì.
- Best features: Film Dossier
- Best local TV: Antennatre (North Itally), Teleroma 56 (Center Italy) and Telenorba (South Italy).
- Best titletrack: Fatalità by Raffaella Carrà

== Debuts ==
=== RAI ===
==== Variety ====
- Piccoli fans –show for children hosted by Sandra Milo, with the music performance of little singers; 6 seasons.
- Il gioco dei mestieri (The game of the works) – game show reserved to craftsmen and handworkers, hosted by Luciano Rispoli; 3 seasons.

==== News and educational ====
- Geo – travel magazine, ideated by Folco Quilici and prosecuted with various titles and hosts; again on air.
- Il mondo di Quark (Quark's world) – popular science program, care of Piero Angela, proposing moreover the BBC nature documentaries; 15 seasons.

=== Finivest ===
==== Variety ====
- Dee-Jay television – musical show, hosted by Claudio Cecchetto and others, in collaboration with Radio Deejay; 8 seasons. It introduces in Italy the MTV formula of a continuous flux of videoclips.
- SuperSanremo (then Festival di primavera) – musical show, ideated by Claudio Cecchetto, replaying the songs of the Sanremo Music Festival; 4 seasons.
- Risatissima (Super-laugh) – comic variety, set in a cruise ship, hosted by Milly Carlucci, then by Lino Banfi, 2 seasons. It's one of the most successful variety in Canale 5 history, with an average rate of 15 million viewiers.
- W le donne – talent show with only female contestants, hosted by Andrea Giordana and Amanda Lear; 2 seasons.
- Tuttiinfamiglia, gameshow, Italian version of Family feud, hosted by Claudio Lippi, then by Lino Toffolo; 6 seasons.

==== News and educational ====
- Nonsolomoda (Fashion and not only) – fashion magazine, care of Fabrizio Pasquero, with various female hosts; lasted till 2012.
- Be bop a lula – magazine about pop music and youth world, hosted by Red Ronnie; 8 seasons.
- Calcio spettacolo - football magazine, hosted by Sandro Piccinini; 5 seasons.
- Jonathan, dimensione avventura – magazine about travels, adventures and extreme sports, hosted by Ambrogio Fogar; 7 seasons.

==== Serial ====
- (United States) CHiPs
- Orazio – sitcom directed by Paolo Pietrangeli, with Maurizio Costanzo (basically playing himself) and Simona Izzo; 3 seasons.

=== Other private channels ===
- Serenamente musica, then Cantando ballando (Singing and dancing) – show of liscio and dance music, again on air (Serenissima TV, then Canale Italia)

== Shows of the year ==
=== Rai ===
==== Drama ====
- Kaos – by Paolo and Vittorio Taviani, from the Sicilian tales of Luigi Pirandello, distributed also in a theatrical version; last role together for Franco and Ciccio.
- Notti e nebbie (Nights and fogs) – by Marco Tullio Giordana, from the Carlo Castellaneta's novel, with Umberto Orsini and Eleonora Giorgi; in 2 parts. It's the tragic story, set in the Milan of 1944, of a RSI police officer, fanatic fascist and cruel persecutor of the partisans, but not entirely devoid of remorses and humanity.
- Nucleo zero by Carlo Lizzani, from Luce D’Eramo's novel, with Patrick Bauchau and Giacomo Piperno; drama about left-wing terrorism.
- Mio figlio non sa leggere (My son can't read) – by Franco Giraldi, from the memoir by Ugo Pirro abnout his dyslexic son, with Omero Antonutti, Mismy Farmer and Itaco Nardulli.
- Western di cose nostre - by Pino Passalaqua, from a Leonardo Sciascia's tale, script by Andrea Camilleri, with Domenico Modugno; in 2 parts. In 1916, an unsuspected apothecary carries on a personal revenge, putting two mafia gangs against each other.
- Chi ha visto Daniela? (Who has seen Daniela?) – mystery by Vittorio Barino, with Fiorenza Marcheggiani and Gianni Mantesi; coproduction with RTSI.
- I veleni dei Gonzaga (Gonzaga's poisons) – by Vittorio De Sisti, with Luca Barbareschi (Federico II Gonzaga) and Daniela Poggi (Isabella Boschetti).
- Raffaello (Raphael) by Anna Zanoli, with Antonio Fattorini in the title role and Anne Canovas (La Fornarina)

==== Miniseries ====
- La piovra (The octopus) – by Damiano Damiani, script by Ennio De Concini, with Michele Placido, Barbara De Rossi, Florinda Bolkan and Flavio Bucci; 6 episodes. The superintendent Corrado Cattani, enquiring about the killing of a colleague and the drug traffic, has to fight against the omnipotent Sicilian mafia. The series, an effective mix of spectacle and civil engagement, gets an extraordinary public success, both in Italy (with 15 million viewers) and abroad, and has nine follow-ups.
- Buio nella valle (Darkness in the valley) by Giuseppe Fina, with Maria Schneider and Orso Maria Guerrini; 3 episodes. Inspired by the true story of the five “Alleghe murders”.
- Melodramma – by Sandro Bolchi, with Gastone Moschin and Laura Lattuada; 4 episodes. The tragic love between an opera singer on the sunset boulevard and a young and unscrupulous girl.
- I ragazzi della valle misteriosa (Mystery valley's boys) by Marcello Aliprandi, with Kim Rossi Stuart (debuting) and Veronika Logan, from the Aloisio Th. Sonnleitner's novels; two boys, fleeing the war, retrace human evolution from prehistoric times onwards.

===== Period dramas =====
- Cuore (Heart) – by Luigi Comencini, from the Edmondo De Amicis’ novel, script by Suso Cecchi D’Amico, with Johnny Dorelli, Giuliana De Sio, Eduardo De Filippo (in his last role) and the ten years old Carlo Calenda (grandson of the director and future politician) as protagonist; in 6 episodes. Comencini gives a very personal version of the book, criticizing its sentimentalism and nationalism and adding a frame story, where the little students, grown up, have to face the tragedy of the First World War.
- Piccolo mondo moderno (The little world of the present) by Daniele D’Anza and Il santo by Gianluigi Calderone, both from Antonio Fogazzaro's novels and with Aldo Reggiani and Lorenza Guerrieri (see year 1983).
- La bella Otero – by Josè Maria Sanchez, with Angela Molina in the title role, Mismy Farmer and Harvey Keitel; 4 episodes.

===== Dramedy =====
- ... e la vita continua (... and the life goes on) by Dino Risi, with Virna Lisi, Jean-Pierre Marielle and Vittorio Mezzogiorno; 8 chapters. Saga of a Lombard upper-class family, from 1945 onwards, airing American serials such as Dallas.
- Voglia di volare by Pier Giuseppe Murgia, with Gianni Morandi and Claude Jade; 4 episodes.
- Quei trentasei gradini (Those thirty-six steps), by Luigi Perelli, written by Ennio De Concini, with Ferruccio Amendola and Maria Fiore; the life of a Roman building's tenants, seen through the eyes of the doorman; 6 episodes.

==== Serials ====
- I racconti del maresciallo (The marechal's tales) – by Giovanni Soldati, from the stories of his father Mario; follow-up of the 1968 serial, with Arnoldo Foà in the role once of Turi Ferro.
- Naumachos, storie di mare di vento (Wind and sea stories) – sea adventure serial directed by Bruno Vailati, with Mario Adorf, coproduced with Antenne 2.

===== Cartoons =====
- Sherlok Hound (cartoon) –Italian-Japanese coproduction, realized in collaboration by Toni Pagot and Hayao Miyazaki.
- Clorofilla dal cielo blu – ecological cartoon from the Bianca Pitzorno's novel, about the adventure of two boys and a sentient extraterrestrial plant; coproduced with Switzerland.

==== Variety ====
- Buon compleanno TV (Happy Birthday, TV) – show in honor of the Italian television's thirtieth anniversary, hosted by Pippo Baudo.
- Te lo do io il Brasile (I give you Brazil) – mixture of variety and travel program, with Beppe Grillo as protagonist and Rita Lee as constant gust.
- Cari amici vicini e lontani (Dear friends, near or far) – celebrative show for the 70th anniversary of Italian radio, hosted by Renzo Arbore.
- Polvere di pitone (Python dust) – with Maria Rosaria Omaggio and Leo Gullotta.
- Taranto story - tribute show to Nino Taranto.
- Il trappolone (The big trap) – game hosted by Renzo Montagnani and Daniela Poggi, with Giuni Russo as constant guest.

==== News and educational ====
- Sheridan Indagine sui sentimenti (Sheridan investigation about sentiments) – enquiry, in form of detective story, about the sentiments in the modern society, from the various forms of love to the sport and music passions. Final role for Ubaldo Lay who plays, for the last time, the Lieutenant Sheridan, become a private eye.
- Effetto video 8 – Professione reporter (Video 8 effect- Profession reporter) magazine by Aldo Bruno and Milena Gabanelli. The program uses an innovative method for Italy; every episode is realized by a free-lance journalist, working alone with a portable video camera (Video 8).
- Action now – by Brando Quilici, series about the American "High sensations seekers".
- Riso in bianco, Nanni Moretti atlòeta di sè stesso (White rice: Nanni Moretti athlete of himself) – by Marco Colli; documentary about Nanni Moretti and the making of Sweet body of Bianca, through the fiction of an interview with a Japanese journalist (Gianni di Gregorio).
- Sulla carta sono tutti eroi (On paper, everybody is an hero) – enquiry about Italian comics.

=== Fininvest ===
==== Miniseries ====
- (United States) V and V The final battle

==== Variety ====
- Quo vadiz? – ideated by Maurizio Nichetti, Gabriele Salvatores and Silvio Berlusconi himself and hosted by Nichetti and Sydney Rome; first major Fininvest production, it is a variety show with a demented humor inspired by ancient Rome.
- La luna nel pozzo (The moon in the well) – quiz hosted by Domenico Modugno and then by Marco Clumbro, because the singer's health troubles; the winning contestant can make his old dream come true.
- Autostop – quiz hosted by Marco Columbro.
- Bene, bravi, bis, with Franco and Ciccio and Edwige Fenech.

==== News and educational ====
- Bit – informatics magazine, with Luciano De Crescenzo.

=== Other private channels ===
- Sponsor city - variety set in an imaginary advertising company, with Diego Abatabtuono and Lory Del Santo; last production of the Mondadori's Rete 4.

== Ending this year ==
- Bandiera gialla
- Blitz
- La bustarella
- Caccia al tesoro
- Ci pensiamo lunedì
- Il circo di Sbirulino
- Domenica con Five
- Giallo sera
- Un milione al secondo
- Mister Fantasy
- Pomeriggio con Five
- Popcorn
- Pranzo in TV
- Il sistemone
- Gli speciali di Retequattro
- Test, gioco per conoscersi

== Deaths ==
- 24 March: Lilla Brignone, (70), actress.
- 13 August: Alberto Lupo, (59), actor.
- 27 September: Nicolò Carosio (77), sport journalist and Ubaldo Lay (67), actor.
- 16 October: Tino Scotti (78), comic actor.
- 31 October: Eduardo De Filippo (84), actor and playwright and Leonardo Cortese (68), actor and director.
- 20 November: Carlo Campanini, (73), comic actor.
- 29 November: Massimo Valentini, (54), journalist.
