= 1983 in Italian television =

This is a list of Italian television related events from 1983.

== Events ==
1983 is a turning point in the story of Italian television. After thirty years of undisputed RAI preponderance, Berlusconi's Canale 5 fights as equal the public television and crushes the competition by the other two private networks: Rusconi's Italia 1 is absorbed by Fininvest, Mondadori's Rete 4, despite a programming of good standard, must face growing debts, moreover for a bad management of the advertising.

=== Rai ===
- 6 January: the final evening of Fantastico 3, hosted by Corrado Mantoni and Raffaella Carrà, gets the highest ratings of the year (27, 4 million viewers).
- 5 February: Tiziana Rivale wins the 1983 Sanremo festival with Sarà quell che sarà, while Toto Cotugno gains the “people's prize”, assigned by the audience through TOTIP coupons, with "L'Italiano". Vasco Rossi polemically reveals the use of playback, leaving the stage before the end of his song "Vita spericolata".
- March 6: the third RAI channel, till then publicity free, begins to broadcast advertisements.
- April 13-14: the second RAI channel broadcasts, for the first time on the Italian television, Gone with the wind, in two episodes.
- June 13: the popular presenter Enzo Tortora is jailed, with the charge of Camorra association and drug trafficking; the public opinion divides into supporters of his innocence or guilt.
- October 3: RAI anticipates the opening of TV broadcasting from half past twelve to noon. In the lunch time slot, so far neglected, the first RAI channel airs a new phone quiz show, Pronto Raffaella? with Raffaella Carrà (see below).
- October 9: the First, Second and Third RAI Channels change name in RAI 1, RAI 2 and RAI 3 and get new logos (respectively, a sphere, a cube and a pyramid).

=== Private channels ===
- January 2: birth of Rete A, owned by the editor Alberto Peruzzo. It begins as a generalist channel, but soon it specializes in home shopping and Latin-American telenovelas.
- January 5: Edilio Rusconi sells Italia 1 to Fininvest, for 35 billion liras. The channel becomes a television aimed to the young people.
- April 26–27: Rete 4 gets a scoop. While in Turin the trial to the Red Brigades is in progress, the channel broadcasts, in two evenings, an Enzo Biagi's interview to Patrizio Peci, former terrorist, and then collaborator of justice.
- May:Canale 5, with a share of 13%, overwhelms RAI 2 and becomes the second Italian channel; Publitalia, the Fininvest advertising agency, with a 504 million liras turnover, overcomes Sipra, the RAI agency.
- November 21: Canale 5 airs the first episode of the miniseries The thorn birds; it gets very high ratings, with a peak of 14 million viewers, also thanks its scandalous matter (the forbidden love of a Catholic priest). In competition, Rete 4 airs The winds of war but with very disappointing audience results, despite a massive advertising campaign. The defeat in the “war of the fictions” deepens the Rete 4's crisis.

== Debuts ==
=== RAI ===
==== Variety ====
- Pronto Raffaella? (Hello Raffaella?) – Noon show on RAI 1, directed by Gianni Boncompagni and hosted by Raffaella Carrà; 2 seasons. The program alternates musical numbers, talk show moments (with important guests, as Mother Teresa) and phone games. It gets an extraordinary and unexpected public success, moreover thanks to the phone games; they are very simple and naïve but allow the public at home to interact with the TV star. RAI is forced to strictly rule the calls, to avoid the clogging of the phone lines.
- Serata d’onore (Tribute), spring show in favor of UNICEF, hosted by Pippo Baudo and others; 8 seasons.
- Al Paradise (3 seasons) – directed by Antonello Falqui, with Oreste Lionello. An old-fashioned variety show that that is the same successful in ratings.
- Ci pensiamo lunedì (We'll think about it on Monday) – by Romolo Siena, with Renzo Montagnani (who, for the show, creates the character of the hot tempered priest Don Fumino) and Alida Chelli; 2 seasons.
- Napoli prima e dopo (Naples, first and after) – festival of Naples songs; 34 editions.
- Il cappello sulle ventitré – sexy variety, including also stripteases with full nudity, hosted by Paolo Mosca and Rosa Fumetto; 4 seasons.
- Che fai, mangi? (What are you doing, eating?) cooking show hosted by Carla Urban, then by Enza Sampò; 2 seasons.

===== Quiz and games =====
- Caccia al tesoro – game of scavenger hunt in exotic places, hosted by Jocelyn Hattab and Lea Pericoli; 2 edizioni.
- Loretta Goggi in quiz – quiz about show business, hosted by Loretta Goggi; 2 seasons.
- Test, gioco per conoscersi (A game to know himself) – game based on the psychological tests, hosted by the journalist Emilio Fede and the psychologist Enzo Spaltro; 2 seasons.
- Giallo sera, hosted by Renzo Palmer; 2 seasons. The contenders must solve a crime story, played by the same Palmer as a hotel detective.

==== News and educational ====
- Italia sera – in-depth magazine broadcast in access prime-time, hosted by Erica Bonaccorti and Mino Damato (then replaced by Piero Badaloni); 4 seasons.
- Colosseum – semiserious magazine about the game and the show, by Brando Giordani and Emilio Ravel; 5 seasons.
- La straordinaria storia dell’Italia (Extraordinary history of Italy) – with various hosts and Rossana Podestà as constant guest; 4 seasons.
- Trent’anni della nostra storia (Thirty years of our history) – a mixture of variety and historical reportage about Italy from 1954 (birth of television) to 1986, hosted by Paolo Frajese; 4 seasons.

==== For children ====
- La banda dello zecchino (The zecchino band, later Il sabato dello zecchino, The zecchino Saturday and Ma che domenica! What a Sunday), weekly show bound to the Zecchino d’oro, with various hosts; 19 seasons.
- Cartoni magici (Magic cartoons) – 2 seasons.

=== Fininvest ===
==== Variety ====
- Drive-in – cabaret show, set in an imaginary drive-in restaurant, written by Antonio Ricci, with Gianfranco D’Angelo, Ezio Greggio and Enrico Beruschi; 5 seasons. The show is based to two elements, by then revolutionary: the unceasing flux, without musical moments or dead times, of sketches, comic monologues and film parodies; and the constant presence of nice girls scantily dressed. It is the most successful Fininvest variety of the Eighties and launches many comic actors (Giorgio Faletti, Enzo Braschi, Enzo Salvi) and female sex-symbols (Carmen Russo, Lory Del Santo).
- OK, il prezzo è giusto! – game show, Italian version of The Price Is Right, hosted by Gigi Sabani, Iva Zanicchi and others; 21 seasons.
- ZigZag - early evening quiz, hosted by Raimondo Vianello; 3 seasons.
- Bandiera gialla (Jellow flag) – musical show for the youngest ones, hosted by Red Ronnie; 2 seasons.
- Deejay television – videoclip show, hosted by Claudio Cecchetto and care of Radio Deejay; 8 seasons.
- Help – game about pop music, hosted by Fabrizia Carminati; 4 seasons.

==== News and educational ====
- Record – sporting magazine, hosted by Cesare Cadeo and Giacomo Crosa; 4 seasons.

=== Other private channels ===
- Accendi un’amica (Light a friend): home shopping program (RETE A). Some hosts, as Guido Angeli, testimonial of the Aiazzone furniture, and Wanna Marchi, producer and seller of improbable slimming products, become popular despite (or thanks) the bad taste of their performances.
- M’ama non m’ama (He loves me or not?) (Rete 4), with Sabina Ciuffini and Marco Predolin; 3 seasons. First Italian dating show
- Un milione al secondo (A million by second) (Rete 4) – quiz hosted by Pippo Baudo (for the first time in a private channel); 2 seasons.
- Gli affari sono affari (Business is business) (TMC) – game show hosted by Jocelyn Hattab, set in a supermarket, with clients casually chosen as contenders; 2 edizioni.

=== International ===
- (United States) Fame (RAI 2)
- (United States) Capitol (RAI 2)
- (United States) The Smurfs (Canale 5)

== Shows of the year ==
=== RAI ===
==== Drama ====
- Flipper – by Andrea Barzini, with Andrea Mingardi, Chrisitan De Sica and (introducing) Margherita Buy, in two episodes; the misadventures of a wannabe rock star against the backdrop of an Emilian small-town.
- Il passo falso (The misstep) by Paolo Poeti, with Michele Placido and Valeria Ciangottini; the revenge of a man convicted of murder against his accomplices who went unpunished.
- 10 registi italiani, 10 racconti italiani (10 Italian directors, 10 Italian tales); cycle of TV movies. The most significant is Avventura di un fotografo (A photographer's adventure) by Francesco Maselli, from an Italo Calvino's tale.
- Don Chisciotte by Maurizio Scaparro, from Miguel de Cervantes’ Don Quixote, with Pino Micol and Peppe Barra.
- Per un viaggio in Italia, trilogy of TV-movie about a travel in Italy, directed by three non-Italian female writer (Susan Sontag, Edith Bruck, Marguerite Duras).
- Un marziano a Roma (A martian in Rome) – directed and interpreted by Antonio Salines, from an Ennio Flaiano's play. An alien landed in Rome passes quickly from fame to oblivion.
- The scarlet and the black, by Jerry London, with Gregory Peck, Christopher Plummer and John Gielgud; 2 episodes.
- La freccia nel fianco (The arrow in the side) – by Giovanni Fago, with Anne Canovas, from the Luciano Zuccoli novel, about the tragic love between a mature woman and a younger boy.

==== Miniseries ====
- Delitto e castigo (Crime and punishment) by Mario Missiroli, script by Tullio Kezich, with Mattia Sbragia; 5 episodes. The serial is wholly shot in studio, to get the claustrophobic atmosphere of the Dostoevskij's novel.
- Quer pasticciaccio brutto de via Merulana (That awful mess on Via Merulana) – by Piero Schivazappa, from the Carlo Emilio Gadda's novel, with Flavio Bucci; 4 episodes.
- Fontamara (extended version for the television) by Carlo Lizzani, from Ignazio Silone's novel, with Michele Placido and Ida Di Benedetto; 4 episodes.
- Piccolo mondo antico (The little world of the past) by Salvatore Nocita, from Antonio Fogazzaro's novel, with Mario Cordova, Laura Lattuada and Alida Valli; 4 episodes. It's followed by other two miniseries from Fogazzaro (Piccolo mondo moderno, by Daniele D’Anza, and Il santo, by Gianluigi Caldirone).
- L’amante dell’orsa maggiore (Lover of the great bear) – by Anton Giulio Majano, from the Sergiusz Piasecki's novel set among the Polish smugglers, with Ray Lovelock, Alberto Lupo (in his last role) and Ida Di Benedetto; 7 episodes.
- Basileus Quartet by Fabio Carpi, with Omero Antonutti.
- Benedetta & company by Alfredo Angeli, with Catherine Spaak, Maruzio Micheli and Corinne Clery; 6 episodes; The story of a family made up of a newborn girl, two teenage parents and four still young grandparents.

==== Serial ====
- Le storie di Mozziconi – by Nanni Fabbri, with Leo Gullotta as a Roman tramp, from Luigi Malerba's tales.

==== Variety ====
- Morto Troisi, viva Troisi! (Troisi is dead, hail for Troisi) – by Massimo Troisi, with Roberto Benigni and Lello Arena; mockumentary where the Neapolitan actor stages his death, his burials and the hypocritical comments of his colleagues.
- Pranzo in TV (Dinner in TV) – talk show, hosted by Luciano Rispoli; VIP and ordinary people are reunited around a dinner table to comment the daily events.
- Chewing gum show – comic variety, with Cochi Ponzoni and Maurizio Micheli.
- Folkitalia – variety with Toni Cosenza.
- Galassia 2 – by Gianni Boncompagni; the show, very expensive for its sci-fi scenography, is for RAI the greatest flop of the year.
- Gransimpatico – with Enzo Jannacci. as protagonist and Sylvie Vartan and Giorgio Gaber as constant guests.
- La porta magica (Magic door) – with Renato Rascel (in his last TV show).

==== News and educational ====
- Effetti personali (Personal objects) – documentary by Giuseppe Bertolucci and Loris Mazzetti about the classic movies shot in Emilia Romagna.
- Questo secolo: 1943 e dintorni (This century: 1943 and surrounding times) – enquiry by Enzo Biagi about the Second World War.
- Capitali culturali dell’Europa (Cultural capitals of Europe) – European coproduction in 12 episodes. For RAI, Calo Lizzani and Ermanno Olimi made documentaries, respectively, on Venice and Milan.

=== Finivest ===
==== Miniseries ====
- (United States) - Masada
- (United States) - The thorn bird (see over)

==== Variety ====
- Beauty center show – variety set in a beauty resort, vith Barbara Bouchet and Franco and Ciccio.
- Ciao gente – game show hosted by Corrado Mantoni.
- Ric e Gian folies – with Ric e Gian and Edwige Fenech.

==== News and educational ====
- Falpalà – fashion magazine, hosted by Eleonora Brigliadori.

=== Rete 4 ===
(United States) - The winds of war (see over)

==== Variety ====
- Fascination (Rete 4) – variety about love matters, hosted by Maurizio Costanzo and Simona Izzo (by then his mate).
- Gran varietà (Rete 4) – with Luciano Salce (also director), Loretta Goggi and Paolo Panelli, inspired to a classic RAI radio variety.

=== Ending this year ===
- Attenti a noi due
- Direttissima con la tua antenna
- Fresco fresco
- Il telegramma
- TG3 set
- Zim zum zam
