= Fate vobis =

Playful Italian phrase based on Latin

Fate vobis (Italian pronunciation: [ˈfaːte ˈvɔːbis]) is a famous humorous Italian phrase based on Latin. This dog Latin phrase can be translated as "do as you wish", "do it by yourself". Grammatically speaking, this expression, one of the most popular Latin phrases in Italian language, is composed of fate [ˈfaːte], meaning "do" in Italian and corresponding to facite [ˈfakɪtɛ] in Latin, and vōbīs [ˈwoːbiːs], Latin for "to you". Fate is the second-person imperative form of Italian fare, meaning "to do"; while vōbīs is the dative and ablative form of Latin vōs [woːs], which is the second-person plural pronoun (plural you). It is a jokey expression, whose goal is to ask the interlocutor to do as he better thinks. This ritual formula of giving up indicates, in addition to submission to the will of other people, a desire to keep some dignity.

The origin of the expression is not known, but it has been used since the 19th century. It is found in The Little World of the Past by Antonio Fogazzaro, published in 1895. Its first use in macaronic Latin seems to be fate vobis et favorite miki (Italian pronunciation: [ˈfaːte ˈvɔːbis et favoˈriːte ˈmiːki]), meaning "do as you like and favor me", so "do what is better for me" (with miki adapted from Latin mihi).

== Bibliography ==
- Fumagalli, Giuseppe (1987). L'ape latina. Dizionarietto di 2948 sentenze, proverbi, motti, divise, frasi e locuzioni latine, ecc. Milan: Hoepli.
- Sartor Ceciliot, Mario (1995). "I latinismi liturgici nei dialetti". Studi mediolatini e volgari. 41: 113–125.
- Porta, Laura (2014). "Per un'analisi lessicale di Corona dei Cristiani: categorizzazione lessicale e approfondimenti linguistico-stilistici" (PDF) (in Italian). Université de Lausanne.
- Cascioli, L. (2001). La lingua di Roma (in Italian). Il Parnaso.
