= Lux Film =

Italian cinema company

Lux Film was an Italian film distribution (and later production) company founded by Riccardo Gualino in 1934.

Gualino was an anti-fascist businessman who had clashed with the regime of Mussolini in 1931 and had been forced into internal exile on the island of Lipari. Founded in 1934, the Turin-based company specialised in distributing non-Italian films during its first few years. Relocating in Rome in 1940, Lux began making its own films around this time, with the aim of its output being "low risk and low budget by packaging high-quality art films with cultural content". Unlike the studio system current in Hollywood at the time, the company did not have its own studios, but financed, distributed, and exhibited projects which others brought to it with 'fixed-price contracts' where co-producers were liable for any budget overruns. Gualino did employ executive producers, among whom were Dino De Laurentiis and Carlo Ponti.

Ponti joined the firm in 1940 and was allocated an adaptation of the 1895 Italian classic novel Piccolo mondo antico (The Little World of the Past), which was directed by Mario Soldati, and films starring the Italian comedian Totò. De Laurentiis, who became an executive producer for Lux in 1942, oversaw such successful films as Alberto Lattuada's Il bandito (1946) and Mario Camerini's La figlia del capitano (The Captain's Daughter, 1947) and Riso Amaro (Bitter Rice, 1949). Bitter Rice, a neorealist film whose plot includes "abortion, crime, illicit sex, a gruesome murder, suicide, nudity, and a realistic childbirth scene", was deliberately not submitted by Lux for PCA approval when it reached the United States. The Catholic Legion of Decency rated it 'C' (Condemned) before the distributor agreed to cuts, and the controversy abated. De Laurentiis and Ponti remained with Lux until they formed a partnership in 1950, though Ulysses (1954) and some of their other later productions benefited from the support of Lux.

Lux suffered from a run of loss making productions during the 1950s, which led to a gradual reduction in its production schedule. One of these films, Luchino Visconti's Senso (1954), led to conflict with both the Italian Army and the censors who progressively extended their demand for cuts, before the company protested and the authorities largely relented.

Gualino died in 1964. Lux was acquired by Rovelli SIR, a chemicals conglomerate the same year.
