= Massimo Pianforini =

Italian actor

- Born: 2 February 1890; Serrungarina, Marche, Italy
- Died: 11 October 1966 (aged 76); Fano, Marche, Italy
- Occupation: Actor
- Years active: 1938-1964 (film & TV)

Massimo Pianforini (1890–1966) was an Italian film and television actor.

== Selected filmography ==
- Doctor Antonio (1937)
- For Men Only (1938)
- The Count of Brechard (1938)
- The Knight of San Marco (1939)
- Heartbeat (1939)
- Rossini (1942)
- Malombra (1942)
- Daniele Cortis (1947)
- Les Misérables (1948)
- Devotion (1950)
- The Ungrateful Heart (1951)
- Too Young for Love (1953)
- Policarpo (1959)
- Il padrone delle ferriere (1959)
- The Giants of Thessaly (1960)

== Bibliography ==
- Roy Kinnard & Tony Crnkovich. Italian Sword and Sandal Films, 1908–1990. McFarland, 2017.
