= Daniele Cortis (novel) =

1885 novel by Antonio Fogazzaro

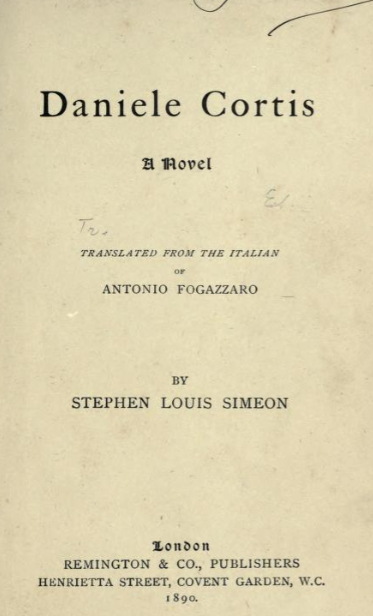
- Title page for Daniele Cortis (1890)
- Author: Antonio Fogazzaro
- Language: Italian
- Genre: Romance
- Publication date: 1885
- Publication place: Italy
- English publication date: 1887
- Media type: Print

Daniele Cortis is an 1885 novel by the Italian writer Antonio Fogazzaro. The plot follows the impossible love between Daniele Cortis, an idealistic Catholic politician, and his cousin Elena, married to a man who does not understand her.

== Background ==
The novel was completed on March 11, 1884, and appeared in January of 1885, after some delay on the publisher's part. It was immediately successful, not so much because of the hero's political ideas (which Fogazzaro regarded as the most important feature of the story), as for the love-story and the romantic renunciation of the heroine.

== Plot ==
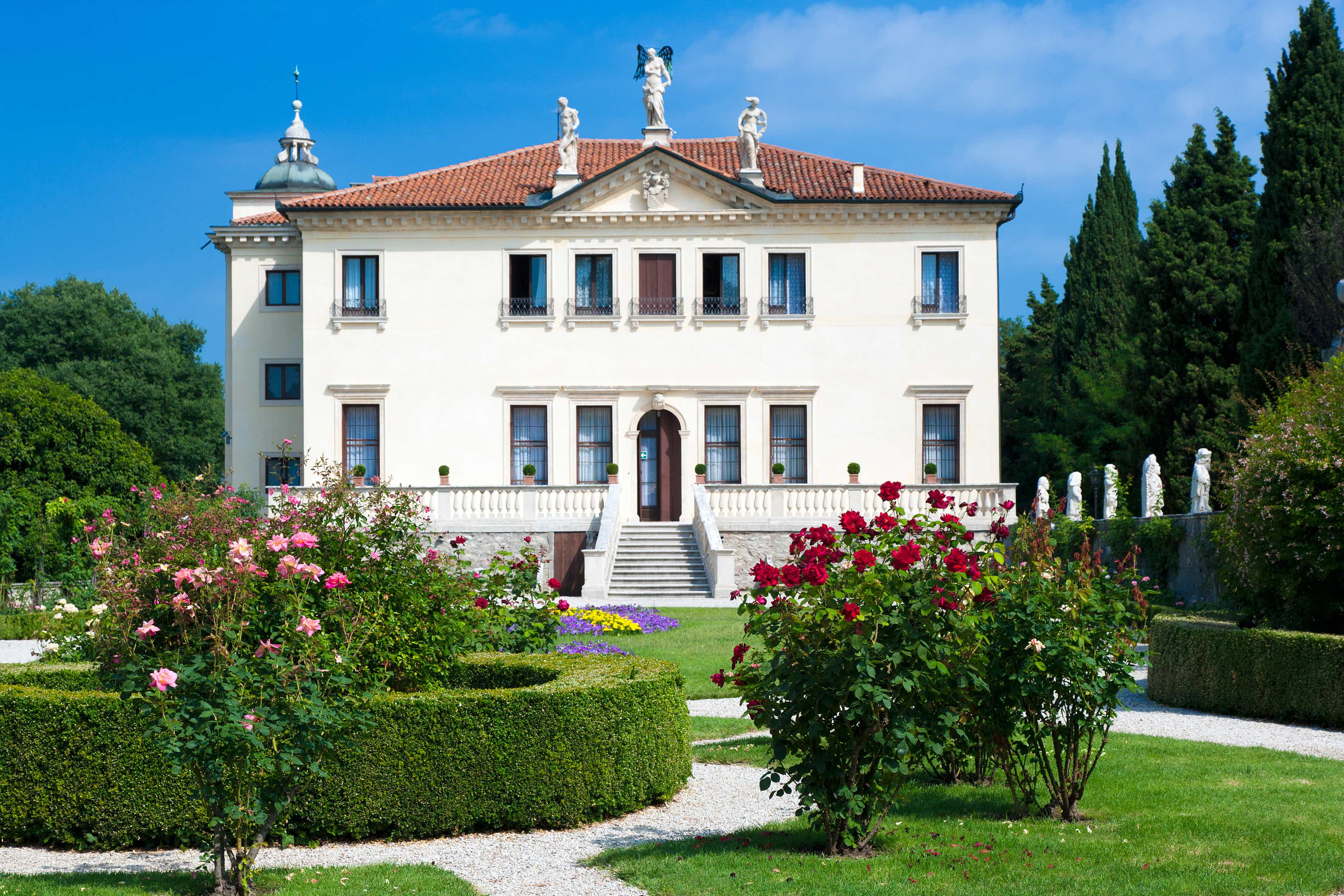
Daniele Cortis' Villa Carré is a direct portrayal of Villa Valmarana, then belonging to Fogazzaro's family

The plot of Daniele Cortis is somewhat simpler than that of Fogazzaro's debut novel, Malombra. The scene is laid, for the most part, at the Villa Carré, at Passo Rovese in the Venetian region. It belongs to Count Lao, the uncle of the heroine Elena, who is married to a man much older than herself, the dissolute Sicilian wastrel Baron of Santa Giulia. To pay his debts, the Baron has Elena ask for a loan from Count Lao, threatening to "exile" her to his estate at Cefalù in Sicily if he does not get the loan. Elena goes to Cefalù, in part to get away from the proximity of her cousin Daniele Cortis. The latter lives near the Villa Carré and is a frequent visitor there; Elena is beginning to feel an affection for Cortis which is too strong to be compatible with her duty to her husband - an affection which Daniele reciprocates.

Cortis is engaged in politics as a candidate for the Chamber of Deputies. He advocates a strong monarchy, a serious social reform, and "a free church in a free state" as had been proposed by Cavour. Cortis wins the election and goes to Rome to take his seat in Parliament. His affairs are complicated by the reappearance of his mother, an old harridan, who had abandoned him when he was small and had gone off with a lover. On Elena's advice, he takes his mother in to live with him, but the situation becomes intolerable. Cortis arranges secretly for Elena's husband's debts to be paid, only to find that it was the Baron of Santa Giulia for whom his mother had abandoned him. His psychological upset is so great that he goes to pieces just before making his maiden speech in Parliament. Considering himself a failure, he returns to Passo Rovese.

Elena's husband has been told that if his debts are paid, he must leave Italy and go to America. Fearful that he may commit suicide, Elena promises to accompany him. Before leaving, she goes to Villa Carré again, but finds Daniele's nearness disturbing. She wavers in her decision to accompany her husband. Both she and Daniele feel strong temptation, but overcome their mutual desire. At an evening musicale, Count Lao and his friend Senator Clenezzi sing an eighteenth-century aria whose words sum up the situation between Daniele and Elena. She and he "sit it out", but she refuses to tell him why she will not play or sing; she has already made up her mind to go. The next day, they decide not to ever see or write to each other again. Their only hope is for a reunion of their spirits in the beyond, through mystic communion in God. The Baron learns that he is to go to Yokohama rather than America; Elena departs for Venice to embark with him there. Cortis feels that he has been strengthened by the trials through which he has passed and by his renunciation. He prepares to reenter political life and fight anew for his ideals.

== Film adaptation ==
In 1947 the novel was turned into a film Daniele Cortis directed by Mario Soldati and starring Vittorio Gassman and Sarah Churchill.

== Bibliography ==
- Brand, Peter; Pertile, Lino (1999). The Cambridge History of Italian Literature. Cambridge: Cambridge University Press. ISBN 9781139056175.
