= Giovanni Barrella =

Italian actor (1884–1967)

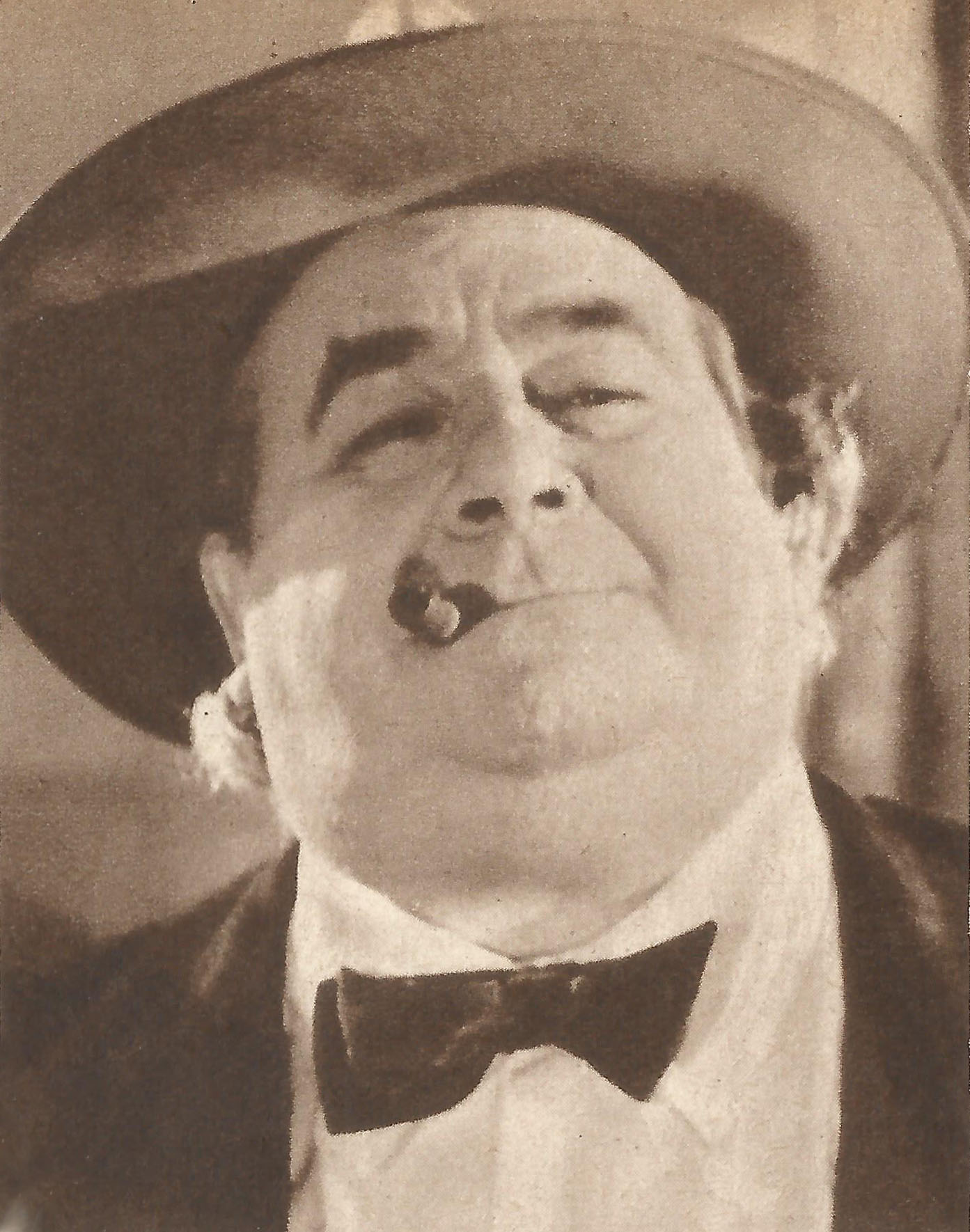

Giovanni Barrella (30 November 1884 – 23 September 1967) was an Italian film actor, writer and painter.

== Biography ==
Barrella was born in Milan to a father who was a major in the Napoleonic Army. Barrella studied fine arts. He worked for Teatro Argentina in Rome and for the Compagnia Lombarda of Alberto Colantuoni. In 1931, he founded his own theatrical company with Paolo Bonecchio. He also published poetry and theatre plays. He died in Erba in 1967.

== Filmography ==
Year	Title	Role	Notes
1912	Le dame nere		Short
1934	Loyalty of Love	Bolchesi - il servitore	
1936	I Love You Only	Cavaliere Rivolta	
1937	Felicita Colombo	Carletto	
1937	The Ferocious Saladin		
1938	Giuseppe Verdi	Un inserviente della Scala	
1938	Departure	Anteo Diana	
1938	L'allegro cantante		
1940	Il pirata sono io!	Il capo cuoco	Uncredited
1941	Piccolo mondo antico	Il curato di Puria	
1942	Malombra	L'ispettore della cartiera	
1947	Vanity	Signor Murzacchi	
1947	Daniele Cortis	Antonio	
1950	A Dog's Life	L'impresario	
1951	Milano miliardaria	Il commissario Fantini	
1951	Tragic Spell	Amministratore Del Conte	(final film role)
