= Malombra (1942 film) =

1942 film directed by Mario Soldati

- Directed by: Mario Soldati
- Written by: Antonio Fogazzaro (novel); Mario Bonfantini; Renato Castellani; Ettore Maria Margadonna; Mario Soldati
- Starring: Isa Miranda; Andrea Checchi; Irasema Dilián; Gualtiero Tumiati
- Cinematography: Massimo Terzano
- Edited by: Giovanni Paolucci; Gisa Radicchi Levi
- Music by: Giuseppe Rosati
- Production company: Lux Film
- Distributed by: Lux Film
- Release date: 17 December 1942
- Running time: 135 minutes
- Country: Italy
- Language: Italian

Malombra is a 1942 Italian drama film directed by Mario Soldati and starring Isa Miranda, Andrea Checchi and Irasema Dilián. It is based on the novel Malombra by Antonio Fogazzaro, which had previously been adapted into a 1917 silent film of the same title. It was made at Cinecittà with sets designed by Gino Brosio. It was produced by Riccardo Gualino's Lux Film. It belongs to the movies of the calligrafismo style.

The film is a gothic melodrama, set in the castle on the edge of Lake Como during the Nineteenth century.

== Cast ==
- Isa Miranda as Marina di Malombra
- Andrea Checchi as Corrado Silla
- Irasema Dilián as Edith Steinegge
- Gualtiero Tumiati as Il conte Cesare d'Ormengo
- Nino Crisman as Nepo Salvador
- Enzo Biliotti as Il commendator Napoleone Vezza
- Ada Dondini as Fosca Salvador
- Giacinto Molteni as Andrea Steinegge
- Corrado Racca as Padre Tosi
- Luigi Pavese as Il professore Binda
- Nando Tamberlani as Don Innocenzo
- Doretta Sestan as Fanny
- Paolo Bonecchi as Il dottor Pitour
- Elvira Bonecchi as Giovanna, la governante
- Giovanni Barrella as L'ispettore della cartiera
- Giacomo Moschini as Giorgio Mirovitch, il notaio
- Anna Huala as La governante di Fosca

== Locations ==
The movie was shot in the Villa Pliniana, Torno (Como). (Info by the Dizionario del Turismo Cinematografico)

== Bibliography ==
- Gundle, Stephen. Mussolini's Dream Factory: Film Stardom in Fascist Italy. Berghahn Books, 2013.
