= Raffaella Bragazzi =

Italian television and radio host (1959–2026)

- Born: 30 June 1959; La Spezia, Italy
- Died: 7 January 2026 (aged 66); Milan, Italy
- Occupations: Television and radio presenter

Raffaella Bragazzi (30 June 1959 – 7 January 2026) was an Italian television and radio host, known for the programme OK, il prezzo è giusto! from 1983 to 1999.

== Life and career ==
After being elected Miss Teenager Cinema in 1979, she made her artistic debut in the 1980s, as a personality on Telemontecarlo and Radio Monte Carlo. For Telemontecarlo, she hosted numerous specials and programmes, including the sports programme A tutto calcio, and worked as an announcer, while for the radio station, she presented various musical programmes and a football programme, Il calcio è di rigore.

From 21 December 1983, she was the voice-over of Ok, il prezzo è giusto!, announcing the various daily contestants, the host, the products and the prizes, acting almost as co-host of the game show; with the exception of a brief stop for maternity in 1998, she remained on the show until 25 June 1999 before being replaced by the Italian voice actor and co-host Matteo Zanotti. During the first episode of D'Iva, aired on Thursday 4 November 2021 on Canale 5, Raffaella Bragazzi had the opportunity to interact with Iva Zanicchi thanks to a telephone connection and recalled some anecdotes related to Ok, il prezzo è giusto! together with the singer-presenter.

Bragazzi died on 7 January 2026, at the age of 66.

== Works ==
- Un sapore nel cuore. I vip si raccontano: ricette e ricordi. Novara: De Agostini. 2013. ISBN 978-88-418-7315-1.

== See also ==
- Ok, il prezzo è giusto!
