= Policarpo (film) =

1959 film

- DVD cover
- Directed by: Mario Soldati
- Written by: Arnaldo Gandolini; Agenore Incrocci; Antonio Navarro Linares; Furio Scarpelli
- Produced by: Silvio Clementelli
- Starring: Renato Rascel
- Cinematography: Giuseppe Rotunno
- Edited by: Mario Serandrei
- Music by: Angelo Francesco Lavagnino
- Distributed by: Titanus
- Release date: May 1959
- Running time: 104 minutes
- Country: Italy
- Language: Italian

Policarpo (Italian: Policarpo, ufficiale di scrittura) is a 1959 Italian comedy film directed by Mario Soldati. It was entered into the 1959 Cannes Film Festival.

== Plot ==
Policarpo De 'Tappetti is a modest ministerial employee of Umbertine Rome: he is precise and diligent, but his excesses of zeal attract him the antipathy of Cavalier Cesare Pancarano di Rondò, his severe office manager, as well as aristocratic aristocrat convinced that he is related to the reigning Savoy dynasty, which is why he spends good money on complex genealogical research in order to ascertain its veracity.

The respective families of the two meet by chance while walking on the Pincio, and the son of Pancarano di Rondò, Gerolamo, falls in love with Celeste, the young and pretty daughter of Polycarp; in front of her insistent court that Gegè of her, a fatuous and superficial character of her, the girl appears rather perplexed, but she agrees to become engaged to him at the insistence of her parents, who foresee for her a brilliant wedding.

Cavalier Pancarano di Rondò, however, does not look favorably on the bond between the two young men, since, considering himself to be of noble lineage, he would like to see his son married to a young lady from the great world ". So to distract Gegè from the idea of marrying Celeste, the knight approaches Edelweiss, a subretta of café-chantant with whom the young man had previously been in love, and convinces her to be seen in a bathing suit on the beach of Ostia, where Gegé plans to go with his girlfriend. they go as expected by the knight: Gegè leaves Celeste to run after his old flame.

In the meantime Celeste falls in love with Mario Marchetti, a serious and honest young mechanic who teaches her to type, wanting the girl to find a job as a typist. Polycarp at first strongly opposes Mario's courtship of his daughter and the idea of Celeste going to work, but in the end he is forced to give in.

Celeste then becomes engaged to Mario, while Polycarp, a graduate calligrapher and archenemy of the typewriter, will have to become a typist by order of the Ministry, otherwise he will lose his job. He will therefore - to everyone's surprise - show off this technical innovation on the occasion of the minister's visit for the inauguration of the new typing system, quickly typing the famous chorus from Il Conte di Carmagnola by Alessandro Manzoni («S'ode a right a trumpet blast [...]»).

Meanwhile, Cavalier Pancarano di Rondò has received unwelcome news: Gegè, who fled with Edelweiss, is married to her in Venice. Immediately afterwards, moreover, the scholars who on his behalf were looking for genealogical documents certifying his alleged blue blood inform him that an ancestor of his was called Biancamano not because he was related to the reigning Savoy dynasty, but because of his profession as a painter. At this point Cavalier Pancarano decides to be more friendly with Policarpo. In the final scene, the splendid cameo of Amedeo Nazzari in the role of a carabiniere who stops a runaway horse.

== Cast ==
- Renato Rascel - Policarpo De Tappetti
- Peppino De Filippo - Cesare Pancarano
- Renato Salvatori - Mario
- Carla Gravina - Celeste
- Romolo Valli - Capo divisione Laurenzi
- Toni Soler - Eufemia De' Tappetti
- Luigi De Filippo - Giorgio Pancarano
- Checco Durante - Father of Mario
- Anita Durante - Amelia Pancarano (as Lidia Martora Maresca)
- Lidia Martora - Amelia Pancarano di Rondò
- José Isbert - Maresciallo Fausto Venanzio
- Ernesto Calindri - Collega di Policarpo
- Trini Montero - Edelweiss
- Roberto Rey - Franquinet
- Alberto Sordi - l'ambulante che vende ombrelli
- Mario Riva - il pompiere del teatro
- Memmo Carotenuto - 'gnor Cino
- Maurizio Arena - il fattorino dei fiori
- Vittorio De Sica - il prestigiatore con il piccione
- Amedeo Nazzari - il carabiniere che ferma il cavallo
- Ugo Tognazzi - il professore
- Massimo Pianforini - Ministro
