= 1968 in Italian television =

This is a list of Italian television related events from 1968.

== Events ==
- The miniseries L'Odissea and La famiglia Benvenuti begin a new trend in the RAI fiction: they are shot in color (although broadcast in black and white) by film directors and with a cinematographic style. However, RAI does not stop producing the traditional “scripted novels” in theatrical style.
- January 6: Dalida wins Partitissima (1967 edition of Canzonissima) with Dan dan dan.
- January 15: the broadcast schedule of the National Channel is extended to the lunch time, now covering the time slots from 12:30 AM to 2 PM and from 17 PM to 23.30 PM; the 1.30 PM news program begins broadcasting. In the first edition, the journalist Piero Angela, visibly upset, gives the tragic news of the Belice earthquake.
- February 3: the Sanremo Festival, hosted for the first time by Pippo Baudo, is won by Sergio Endrigo and Roberto Carlos with Canzone per te. Endrigo is the first of the cantautori to win first place. The show is marked by the presence of illustrious jazzmen, such as Lionel Hampton and Louis Armstrong. It also includes a controversy between the former friends Adriano Celentano and Don Backy for a copyright question, quarreling in front of the RAI cameras.
- June 6: first news marathon in Italian television. From noon to the evening, Piero Angela in studio and Andrea Barbato from Los Angeles follow the events related to the assassination of Robert F. Kennedy.
- August 18: on the magazine Tv7, goes on air I bambini di Bien Hoa (Bien Hoa children), an impressive reportage by Furio Colombo, almost completely without spoken comment, about the American bombing in Vietnam. The program arouses protests and charges of anti-Americanism; the director of the RAI news Fabiano Fabiani is forced to resign.
- October 1: the Swiss television begins color broadcasting, in time for the Mexico Olympic Games. Soon, many Italian viewers prefer the Italian Swiss channel (TSI), in color and not politically conditioned, to RAI.

== Debuts ==
=== Variety ===
- Oggi le comiche (Today slapstick) – Anthology, hosted by Renzo Palmer, of comic shorts from the golden age of silent film.
- Senza rete (Without a net) – Musical show of the summer; lasted for 8 seasons, with various hosts. So called because the singers perform “without the net” of the play-back, it gets, in some years, up 18 million viewers.

=== Serials ===
- La famiglia Benvenuti (The Benvenuti family) – by Alfredo Giannetti, with Enrico Maria Salerno, Valeria Valeri and Claudio Gora. This family comedy about the life of a middle-class family (an architect, his wife and his two sons) is, by now, a precious time capsule about the Italian way of life in the late Sixties. It gets a great success by public and critic and, in 1969, a second season in colors is shot. Later, it's no more shown, because the child star Giusva Fioravanti (who played the role of the younger son) becomes a NAR terrorist.
- I ragazzi di padre Tobia (Father Tobia's children) by Mario Casacci and Alberto Ciambricco. It's a serial for kid about the adventures of a boy-scout band and their spiritual leader, the unconventional parson Father Tobia (Silvano Tranquilli).

=== News and educational ===
- Capolavori nascosti (Hidden masterpieces) – art column, care of Anna Zanoli and Manfredi Taxler; 12 seasons.

== Television shows ==
=== Drama and comedy ===
- Il caso Chessman (The Chessman affair) – by Giuseppe Fina
- Piccola città (Our town) - by Silverio Blasi, from Thorntorn Wilder's play, with Raoul Grassilli and Giulia Lazzarini.
- The miracle worker by William Gibson, directed by Davide Montemurri, with Anna Proclemer and Cinzia De Carolis.
- Processo a porte aperte (Open door trial) – cycle of true crime dramas, directed by Lydia C. Ripandelli; the verdict of a jury of viewers is compared with that of the real trial.
- I giorni della storia (Days of history) - cycle of historical docudramas. It includes L'affare Dreyfus (The Dreyfus affair) – by Leandro Castellani, with Gianni Santuccio as Émile Zola.
- Stasera Fernandel (Fernandel tonight) – cycle of comedy or comedy-thriller tv-movies, coproduced with France, directed by Camillo Mastrocinque.

==== Light theatre ====
- Addio giovinezza (Farewell youth!) – by Antonello Falqui, with Nino Castelnuovo and the singer Gigliola Cinquetti, from the Camasio and Oxilia’s play about the love affairs of two undergraduates.
- Felicita Colombo – by Antonello Falqui, from the Giuseppe Adami's play, with Franca Valeri, Gino Bramieri and Ottavia Piccolo. In Milan, two exponents of opposite social classes (a woman owner of a delicatessen and a fallen aristocrat) become in-laws.
- L'acqua cheta (The quiet water) – by Augusto Novelli, directed by Alessandro Brissoni, with Arnoldo Foà, The piece, a classic of Florentine dialect theater, tells the love intrigues of the two daughters of a cabman.

=== Miniseries ===
==== Period drama ====
- Il circolo Pickwick (The Pickwick papers) – by Ugo Gregoretti, with Raffaele Pisu as Pickwick, Enzo Cerusico as Samuel Weller and Gigi Proietti as Jingle. Breaking with the traditional seriousness of the Italian period dramas, the director transposes the Dickens’ novel in a light-hearted and experimental style, sometimes also appearing onscreen, in modern dresses, to chat with the characters.
- Tartarino sulle Alpi – from Alphonse Daudet's Tartarin sur les Alpes, follow-up to Tartarin of Tarascon, by Edmo Fenoglio, with Tino Buazzelli; 4 episodes.
- La freccia nera (The black arrow) – by Anton Giulio Majano, with Aldo Reggiani, Loretta Goggi (in her first adult role) and Arnoldo Foà, from the Stevenson’s novel. It was one of the show most loved by the youngest ones and the title track by Riz Ortolani became a hit.
- Le mie prigioni (My prisons) – by Sandro Bolchi, with Raoul Grassilli and Arnoldo Foà, from the autobiographical book of Silvio Pellico.
- Non cantare, spara (Shot, don’t sing) – by Daniele D’Anza, with the Quartetto Cetra. Musical parody of the western movies, it was a clamorous flop, notwithstanding its stellar cast.
- L’Odissea (Odyssey) – by Franco Rossi, with Bekim Fehmiu as Odysseus and Irene Papas as Penelope. It was the first great coproduction among European televisions (Italy, France, Deutschland and Yugoslavia), of a spectacular value never got before on the little screen. Shot in color, it was seen in black and white by the Italian viewers; notwithstanding, it was the hit of the year for public and critic The 80 years old poet Giuseppe Ungaretti introduced every episode reading his Homer’s’ translation.
- Cristoforo Colombo – biopic, cioproduced with Spain, by Vittorio Cottafavi, with Francisco Rabal in the title role, Roldano Lupi and Paola Pitagora; 4 episodes.

==== Mystery ====
- Sherlock Holmes – by Guglielmo Morandi, with Nando Gazzolo in the title role, from The valley of fear and The hound of the Baskervilles.
- La donna di quadri (The queen of diamonds) – mystery by Leonardo Cortese, with Ubaldo Lay as the police lieutenant Sheridan. It's the second chapter of the “cycle of the queens” (of the playing cards). As in the others Sheridan's inquiries, the story is set in a fictive America, fully reconstructed in studio (but the final chapter is set in Capri).
- I racconti del maresciallo (The marshal's tales) – by Mario Landi, from the stories of Mario Soldati (who appears onscreen, introducing every episode). Turi Ferro plays magisterially a Carabinier's Marshasl, zealous at work but very human; his stories are, more than detective tales, sketches about the Italian province life.

=== Variety ===
- Canzonissima 1968 (Supersong 1968) – hosted by Mina, Walter Chiari and Paolo Panelli. The winner of the traditional musical competition of the winter is Gianni Morandi, with Scende la pioggia (The rain goes on, cover of Eleonore by the Turtles).It's the most seen show of the year, with 21, 2 million viewiers.
- Che domenica amici (What a Sunday, my friends!) – hosted by Raffaele Pisu and the duo Ric e Gian.
- Quelli della domenica (The Sunday people) – comic variety, broadcast the Sunday afternoon. It revealed to a large public the duo Cochi e Renato and moreover the disturbing and grotesque humor by Paolo Villaggio. The Genoese comic created, for the show, two of his most famous characters: the professor Otto von Kranz, a German illusionist, arrogant and muddler, and Giandomenico Fracchia, a pusillanimous clerk oppressed by his superiors.
- Delia Scala story – tribute show to the famous soubrette.
- Su e giù (Up and down) – quiz, hosted by Corrado Maltoni.
- Vengo anch’io (I come too) – hosted by Raffaele Pisu.

=== News and educational ===
- Appunti per un film sull’India (Notes for a movie about India) – by Pier Paolo Pasolini. The writer-director, in spite of his very fierce critics on TV and mass-culture, accepts to realize for RAI a documentary about “hunger and religion in the Third world”. In the same year, he meets Ezra Pound for the TV magazine Incontri.
- Questa nostra Italia (This our Italy) – by Guido Piovene and Virgilio Sabel. Piovene repeats, for the television, the tour of Italy already performed in 1955 for the radio.
- I Beatles in ritiro (The Beatles in India) - reportage by Furio Colombo for TV/
- Un’ora con Herbert Marcuse – by Gastone Favero, for the magazine Incontri.
- Faccia a faccia (Face to face) – talk-show about political and social questions, with average people as guests, hosted by Aldo Falivena.

== Ending this year ==
- Almanacco
- Non è mi troppo tardi

== Deaths ==
- December 12: Antonio Cifariello (38), actor, then TV documentary maker. He dies for an air accident while he realizes a reportage for RAI in Zambia.

== See also ==
- List of Italian films of 1968
