= Daniele Cortis =

- Directed by: Mario Soldati
- Written by: Aldo de Benedetti; Mario Soldati; Mario Bonfantini; Luigi Comencini; Diego Fabbri; Agostino Richelmy
- Produced by: Salvo D'Angelo
- Cinematography: Vencesalo Vich
- Music by: Nino Rota
- Production company: Universalia
- Release date: 1947
- Country: Italy
- Language: Italian

Daniele Cortis (also known as Elena) is a 1947 Italian drama film directed by Mario Soldati and starring Vittorio Gassman, Sarah Churchill and Gino Cervi. The film (set in nineteenth-century Italy) follows the impossible love affair between Elena, a noblewoman married to a man who doesn't understand her, and Daniele Cortis, her young cousin and Christian idealist. It is an adaptation of the 1885 novel of the same title by Antonio Fogazzaro.

== Cast ==
- Vittorio Gassman as Daniele Cortis
- Sarah Churchill as Elena
- Gino Cervi as Il marito di Elena
- Evi Maltagliati as Isa
- Gualtiero Tumiati as Aldo
- Rubi D'Alma as Noemi
- Massimo Pianforini as Valentino
- Marco Tulli as Diego

== Reception ==
From a contemporary review, the Monthly Film Bulletin review noted that the print was cut by about 35 minutes and featured "indifferent dubbing" and a "very poor print quality". The review found that with these issues the film was "incomprehensible", but the film was "an astonishing example of how completely such mutilation can change a film, which in this case was already of indifferent quality."
