= Piccolo mondo antico (film) =

1941 film by Mario Soldati

- Film poster
- Directed by: Mario Soldati
- Written by: Mario Bonfantini
- Based on: The Little World of the Past by Antonio Fogazzaro
- Produced by: Carlo Ponti (uncredited)
- Starring: Alida Valli
- Cinematography: Arturo Gallea (outdoors); Carlo Montuori (indoors)
- Edited by: Gisa Radicchi Levi (uncredited)
- Music by: Enzo Masetti
- Distributed by: Industrie Cinematografiche Italiane
- Release date: 10 April 1941
- Running time: 106 minutes
- Country: Italy
- Language: Italian

Piccolo mondo antico (transl. "Little Ancient World"), known in English as Old-Fashioned World, is a 1941 Italian drama film directed by Mario Soldati and based on the 1895 novel by Antonio Fogazzaro. It belongs to the movies of the calligrafismo style.

== Plot summary ==
During the Italian Risorgimento (mid-nineteenth century), in Austrian-occupied Lombardy, Franco Maironi (Massimo Serato), a young man from an aristocratic family, decides to marry Luisa (Alida Valli), a humble clerk's daughter, against his grandmother, the Marquess Orsola Maironi's wishes. The old lady makes the life of the newly married couple miserable (she destroys the will which would grant Franco his wealth, and causes Luisa's uncle to lose his job, as he was helping them). In the meantime, Luisa gives birth to little Maria. Franco is forced to go to Turin in search of a job. During his absence, Luisa's daughter drowns in Lake of Lugano and she is almost driven mad. Franco returns home for a short time but Luisa reacts coldly towards him. During the Second Italian War of Independence Franco becomes a volunteer soldier in the fight against Austrian and again meets his wife by Lake Maggiore. Despite Luisa's coldness, Franco is sure she still loves him. Aware that he might die in the war, he makes love to her one last time, leaving her pregnant.

== Cast ==
Actor	Role
Alida Valli	Luisa Rigey Maironi
Massimo Serato	Franco Maironi
Ada Dondini	La marchesa Orsola Maironi
Annibale Betrone	Zio Piero
Mariù Pascoli	Maria Maironi
Giacinto Molteni	Il professore Beniamino Gilardoni
Elvira Bonecchi	La signora Barborin Pasotti
Enzo Biliotti	Il signor Pasotti
Renato Cialente	Von Greisberg
Adele Garavaglia	La signora Teresa Rigey
Carlo Tamberlani	Don Costa
Giovanni Barrella	Il curato di Puria
Nino Marchetti	Pedraglio, il cospiratore
Giorgio Constantini	L'avvocato di Varenna
Jone Morino	Donna Eugenia
Anna Carena	Carlotta, la cameriera della marchesa
Domenico Viglione Borghese	Dino

== Production and reception ==
In the midst of the Mussolini dictatorship and the outbreak of World War II, Soldati, Mario Bonfantini, and Alberto Lattuada wrote the script while staying in a villa on Lake Como. The cast and crew were watched by police while filming on site at Lake Lugano, for fear they would attempt to escape to Switzerland. Some actors in the film speak in a Lombardi accent, a potentially subversive inclusion given the cultural repressions of the fascist Italian state.

Despite the possible interpretations of the Austrian villain being an allusion to Adolf Hitler and Nazi Germany, the film was successful and would go on to be one of Soldati's best known films. Giuseppe De Santis, then a young critic, said of the film: "For the first time our cinema offers a landscape that is not rarefied or tackily pictorial, but actually responds to the characters’ humanity, both as an emotional element and as an indicator of their sentiments.” The film launched the career of lead actress Alida Valli.

== Legacy ==
The house of the author Fogazzaro in which some parts of the adaptation were filmed was donated and is now open as a museum.
