= 24 Hours in a Film Studio =

1935 essay by Mario Soldati

- Author: Mario Soldati
- Original title: 24 ore in uno studio cinematografico
- Language: Italian
- Genre: Essay
- Published: 1935
- Publisher: Corticelli
- Publication place: Italy
- Media type: Print

24 Hours in a Film Studio is an essay by Mario Soldati, originally published in 1935 under the pseudonym Franco Pallavera, and republished under his real name for the first time fifty years later.

In a brief initial note, the author states the purpose of the book: "to give everyone who is curious about the cinema a vivid impression of working in a studio: the impression that a layperson would have during a quick visit, with the guidance and occasional explanations and digressions of an expert."

The volume is composed of twelve chapters and a final appendix titled A Bit of Technique. The original 1935 edition was accompanied by illustrations, which are absent in the subsequent Sellerio edition, while it includes a note by Guido Davico Bonino.

== Plot ==
The long working day begins early for the diva starring in the film being produced, who is forced to wake up particularly early to reach the film studio by seven, well ahead of the Director or other actors, and undergo the essential makeup and hairstyling sessions, which can take up to two hours.

However, at nine, the work cannot start due to a set design problem, causing a delay of a couple of hours. Once the issue is resolved, filming finally begins, but throughout the rest of the morning, another two hours pass, and for various reasons, the scene that was ready to be shot at the beginning of the day remains uncompleted. Lunchtime arrives at one without having shot a single frame of film.

In the afternoon, work resumes and proceeds in the usual manner, "very slow, exasperating, nerve-wracking, with one interruption after another," among "complications, unpredictable and unforeseeable incidents." "And so, from shot to shot, rehearsing and re-rehearsing the same lines and expressions for hours on end, with exasperating incidents of all kinds always delaying the work, the day passes. But it is an occupation, for everyone, so intense, so exclusive, so – in a certain sense – outside of reality, or so aimed at creating another reality, that the hours fly by unnoticed."

By nine in the evening, work can continue until midnight and beyond, until the Director calls the final stop. After the filming ends, the director, the cameraman, the assistants, and sometimes even the actors, go to the screening room to watch the results of the previous day's work.

The diva, who was met at six in the morning upon waking, finishes as late as two in the morning and is allowed to arrive a bit later than usual the next day.

When the entire crew has left the facility, work continues in the development and printing workshops throughout the night.

== Genesis of the Work ==
This text was written during a "forced exile" on Lake Orta, in 1934–35. Soldati, after being fired from the Cines production company due to the failure of the film Acciaio, directed by the German Walter Ruttmann, with whom he had rewritten the screenplay originally signed by Luigi Pirandello, accepted to write a guide on the world of cinema based on his personal experience of the past three years.

== Style ==
Although it is intended to be a manualistic work, as evident particularly in the strictly technical appendix, the author avoids writing "an orderly and methodical book on cinema [which] would be rather boring" and enriches the essayistic component with a narrative style to convey to the reader "the vivid, disordered, tumultuous impression [...] of film production."

== Bibliography ==
- Mario Soldati (under the pseudonym Franco Pallavera) (1935). 24 Hours in a Film Studio. Corticelli.
- Mario Soldati (1985). 24 Hours in a Film Studio. with a note by Guido Davico Bonino. Sellerio. p. 155.
