= The Poet's Mystery =

1888 novel by Antonio Fogazzaro

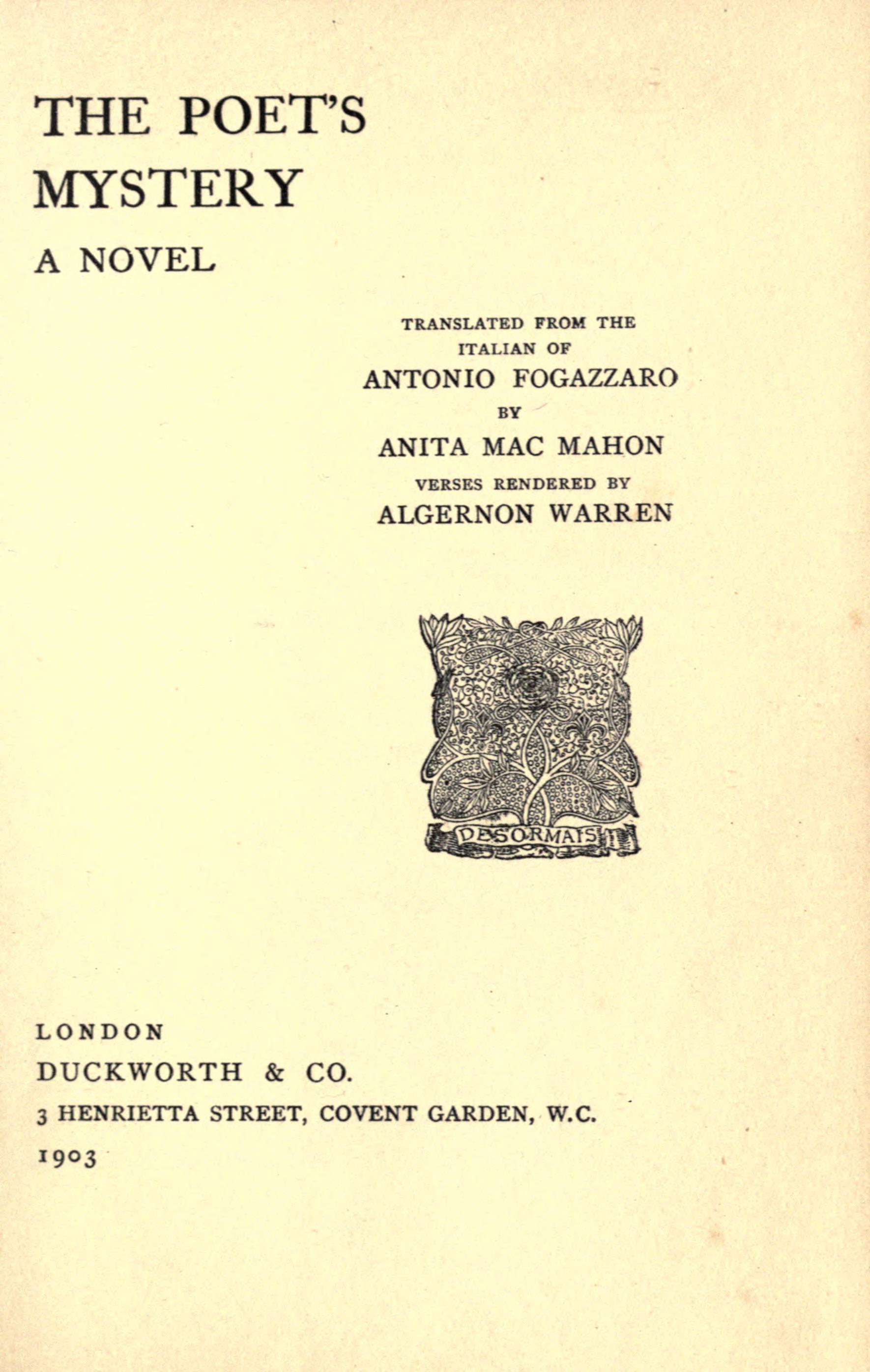
- Title page for The Poet's Mystery (1903 edition)
- Author: Antonio Fogazzaro
- Language: Italian
- Genre: Romance
- Publication date: 1888
- Publication place: Italy
- English publication date: 1903
- Media type: Print

The Mystery of the Poet (Italian:Il mistero del poeta) is an 1888 novel by the Italian writer Antonio Fogazzaro. It is a melodramatic story of the romance between a poet and a fragile woman.

== Description ==
Fogazzaro wrote the novel from November, 1884 to mid-1887. It appeared the next year, first in serial form and then as a book.

The Poet's Mystery is told in the first person by an unnamed narrator, nine years after the events recounted. He meets, at the Hotel Belvedere at Lanzo d'Intelvi, a delicate young woman, blonde, blue-eyed, short-sighted, with a slight limp and a dulcet voice, delicate in health and with a veiled sorrow in her glance. The narrator immediately falls in love with her. He discovers that her name is Violet Yves; she is half English and half Italian. but has been brought up in Germany, as a Catholic, by relatives in the small Bavarian city of Eichstätt. The narrator declares his love, but she says that she is already engaged to a school-teacher in Eichstätt. She cannot break this engagement because of a former entanglement which, she hints darkly, involved something dishonorable. Violet begs the narrator not to seek any further contact with her. He is so enamored of her, however, that he disobeys and follows her after she has left Lanzo d'Intelvi. He traces her to Naples, Rome, and thence to Germany, where the central section of the story takes place.

The narrator catches up with Violet — to her displeasure — at Nuremberg. By chance, he makes the acquaintance of her fiancé's elder brother Stephan Topler, to whom he often refers humorously as Toplerus senior. Similarly, the younger brother, Hans, is frequently called Toplerus junior. Together with Violet and her friend Luise von Dobra, the narrator and Toplerus senior take the train for Eichstätt. After their arrival, the group have an idyllic picnic in the woods between the station and the town, and the narrator has a number of pleasant social contacts during his stay in Eichstätt. He becomes very friendly with Toplerus senior, on the basis of a mutual interest in music, while at the same time he is inundating Violet with letters and poems to persuade her of his unshakable love. Her engagement to Hans, who is also sickly, has been undertaken on the understanding that they were to have a mariage blanc. Violet admits that she has felt attracted to the young Italian, but her puritanical conscience has prevented her from returning his love. She finally consents to marry him. Toplerus junior agrees, despite his bitter disappointment, to give Violet her freedom so that she can marry her Italian suitor. The latter is warned by the Topler brothers that Violet's health is precarious: any excitement might prove fatal to her.

Violet is afraid that the man with whom she was entangled in the past might return to cause difficulties, so it is decided that the wedding shall take place somewhere else. After a short visit to his home in Italy, the narrator returns to Germany, meeting Violet at the estate of some English friends at Rüdesheim, on the Rhine. They take several excursions, on one of which they unexpectedly meet Violet's former lover. The latter has searched everywhere for her, and threatens to kill himself if he cannot have her. Violet and the narrator are finally married at Rüdesheim. They take the train for Wiesbaden, but her former lover is also on the train. Despite the narrator's warnings, the former lover presents himself at the window of the compartment. His appearance gives Violet such a shock that she dies of heart failure. The narrator is inconsolable, but he continues to adore her memory and feels that she is eternally with him in spirit.

== Bibliography ==
- Brand, Peter; Pertile, Lino (1999). The Cambridge History of Italian Literature. Cambridge: Cambridge University Press. ISBN 9781139056175.
