= Enzo Spaltro =

Italian psychologist (1929–2021)

Enzo Spaltro, born Vincenzo Spaltro (Milan, July 3, 1929 – Bologna, March 26, 2021), was an Italian psychologist, academic and television author, a pupil of Agostino Gemelli at the Catholic University of the Sacred Heart in Milan; he specialized with him in work psychology and developed his ideas becoming one of the leading professionals in this field.

In 2007 he founded the Università delle persone in Bologna at the age of 78, based on the idea of a non-formal university with no pre-established roles.

== Biography ==
Born in Milan in 1929, he graduated in Medicine from the University of Milan in 1953, specializing in Occupational Medicine at the same university in 1955 and then, in 1957, in Occupational Psychology at the Catholic University with Agostino Gemelli. He began his university career as Gemelli's assistant and in 1960 became a lecturer in psychology at the Faculty of Political Science at the Catholic University of Milan, under Dean Gianfranco Miglio.

At the same time, he also began working as a consultant for Enrico Mattei Eni company, selecting personnel, organizing conferences and congresses, and founding associations and study centers in the field of occupational psychology and psychosociology. He later carried out his consulting work through the foundation that bears his name, which supported the dissemination of his ideas, and through the University of the People, which he founded in Bologna, the city where he lived.

In 1964, Spaltro founded ANIpla (Italian National Association for Automation) with Guido Rossi and Sandro Gavazzi, and in 1965, he founded AISRI (Italian Association for Industrial Relations Studies) together with Giancarlo Mazzocchi, Gino Giugni and Giuseppe Glisenti at the Catholic University of Milan. this association proposed the structure of industrial relations in force in Italy with its social negotiation functions. The Workers' Statute then gathered and institutionalized many of the things that this association had developed in its first five years of activity. On July 3, 1970, Law 300 (Workers' Statute) was presented to the Italian labor world at the offices of BP Italiana in Milan, in the presence of trade unions and personnel managers.

President for the two-year period 1981/82 of the SIPs Commission for the reform of psychology studies, which led to the transformation of psychology faculties and degree courses in Italian universities. A lecturer since 1981 (and for thirty years) at the University of Bologna, in 1988 he founded and directed the school of specialization in industrial and labor relations at the same university.

From 1982 to 1989, he was the author and host of several television programs on psychology on Rai 1 (Test, Il mercato del sabato, Il bello della diretta, Pomeridiana, Di che vizio sei?), which helped spread awareness of the profession and its potential as a discipline at the service of people.

In 2007, at the age of 78, he founded the University of People in Bologna, based on the idea of a non-formal university without pre-established roles.
