= Il Santo (novel) =

1905 novel by Antonio Fogazzaro

The Saint
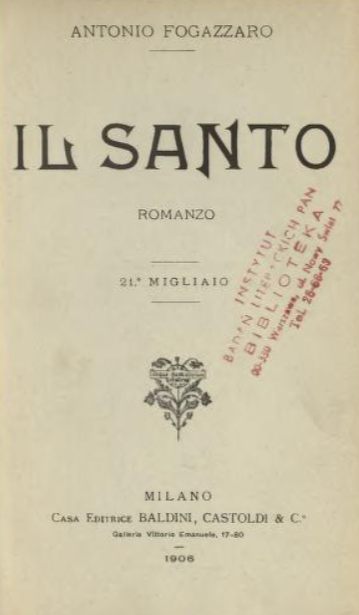
- Title page for Il Santo (1906)
- Author: Antonio Fogazzaro
- Original title: Il Santo
- Language: Italian
- Genre: Fiction
- Publication date: 1905
- Publication place: Italy
- Media type: Print

Il Santo, also known in English as The Saint, is an Italian novel written by Antonio Fogazzaro and published by Baldini & Castoldi in 1905 in Milan. The novel is the third and last of a trilogy in which Piccolo mondo antico is the first and Piccolo mondo moderno is the second. Despite the fact that Fogazzaro was a devout and loyal Catholic, Il Santo was listed on the Index Librorum Prohibitorum. The Vatican's prohibition of this novel helped Fogazzaro achieve a worldwide reputation.

== Plot summary ==
As a sequel to Piccolo mondo moderno, the novel takes up the story of Piero Maironi.

... his wife being in a lunatic asylum, Maironi, artist and dreamer, had fallen in love with a beautiful woman separated from her husband, Jeanne Dessalle who professed agnostic opinions. Recalled to a sense of his faith and his honour by an interview with his wife, who sent for him on his death-bed, he was plunged in remorse, and disappeared wholly from the knowledge of friends and relatives after depositing in the hands of a venerable priest, Don Giuseppe Flores, a sealed paper describing a prophet vision concerning his life that had largely contributed to his conversion. Three years are supposed to have passed between the close of Piccolo Mondo Moderno and the opening of Il Santo, when Maironi is revealed under the name of Benedetto, purified of his sins by a life of prayer and emaciated by the severity of his mortifications, while Jeanne Dessalle, listless and miserable, is wandering around Europe with Noemi d'Arxel, sister to Maria Selva, hoping against hope for the reappearance of her former lover.

After a dramatic meeting with Jeanne Dessale, the reformed Maironi (now Benedetto) takes refuge as a monk in a religious community in the mountain village of Jenne and acquires a reputation among the peasants there as a saint who sometimes works miracles of healing. Bendetto calls for a thorough reform of Christian spirituality and thought. Benedetto/Maironi's program of spiritual reform is developed by Fogazzaro from ideas of the Italian philosopher Antonio Rosmini. Benedetto forms with Don Clemente and Professor Giovanni Selva (in whom the critic Jean Lebrec recognizes Friedrich von Hügel, a close friend of Fogazzaro) the nucleus of a latter-day Cénacle who call themselves Le Catacombe.

Jeanne, his temptress of past years, he keeps sternly at a distance—one interview indeed she forces upon him, but she never enters his presence again until he is in the agony of death.

Benedetto goes to Rome and works among the poor of the Trastevere and Testaccio quarters, but then gains notoriety and becomes enmeshed in clerical and anti-clerical politics. Eventually Benedetto meets with Pope Pius X.

... With all due deference he dilates on what he terms the four evil spirits of the Church of the present day: the spirit of falsehood, the spirit of domination among the priesthood, the spirit of avarice, and the spirit of rigidity. To all of this the Pope listens as the most paternal of fathers, and as one oppressed by the intolerable burden of office, and gravely points out the obstacles in the way of reform.

== Criticism ==
In Il Santo, Piero Maironi intends to evangelize the contemporary world, but, as always happens with Fogazzaro's characters, he fails. The reigning social order is never seriously challenged and the renewal that he, like his author, calls for never takes place. In the end, Fogazzaro's characters are fanciful figures, unable to integrate into everyday life. Social order always triumphs, while justice is postponed to a future known only to divine providence, and possibly only to be found in the next world.

== Translations ==
G. P. Putnam published in 1906 an English translation (The Saint) by Mary Agnetti Prichard. Hachette published in 1906 a French translation (Le Saint) by Georges Hérelle. Georg Müller Verlag published in 1906 a German translation (Der Heilige) by Maria Gagliardi.
