= Malombra (novel) =

1881 novel by Antonio Fogazzaro

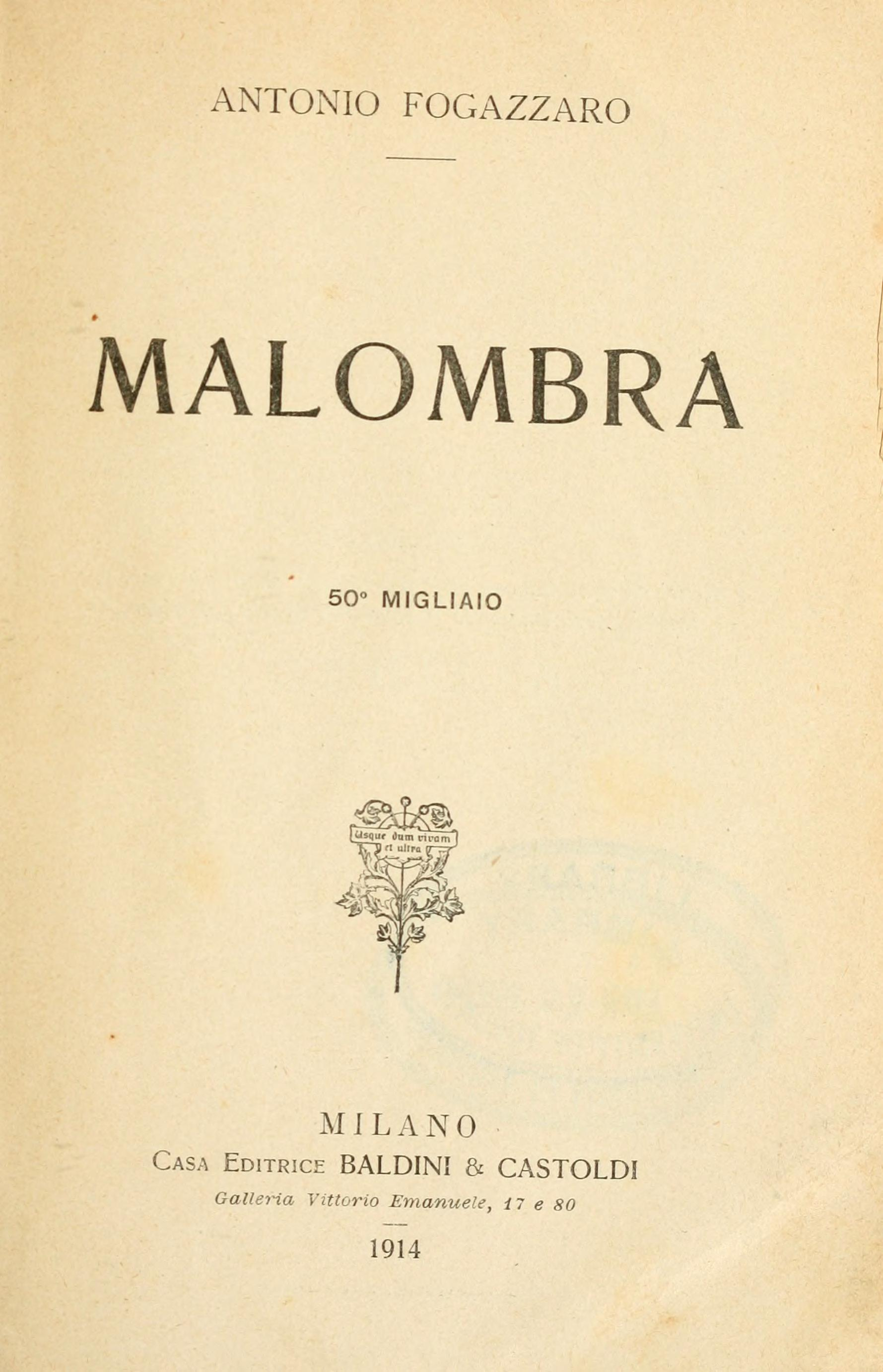
- Title page for Malombra (1914 edition)
- Author: Antonio Fogazzaro
- Language: Italian
- Genre: Gothic
- Publication date: 1881
- Publication place: Italy
- English publication date: 1896
- Media type: Print

Malombra is an 1881 novel by the Italian writer Antonio Fogazzaro. It is a Gothic story set close to Lake Como in the mid-Nineteenth century. Of clear taste decadent, the novel reveals Fogazzaro's interest in occult matters. It was Fogazzaro's debut novel.

== Background ==
After finishing Valsolda, Fogazzaro got down to work in earnest on Malombra in 1876. He never was, at best, a fast worker, and he was slowed down even more by the manifold daily concerns of his household, his growing children, and his frequent trips from Vicenza to nearby or more distant vacation-places. It took him until May 1880 to complete Malombra, and another year passed until it finally appeared in May 1881. As with his two preceding books, Malombra had to be subsidized before a publisher would accept it. Unlike them, it was immediately successful. It was acclaimed by both critics and the reading public, and established Fogazzaro as one of Italy's leading novelists.

== Synopsis ==
The story of Malombra is fairly complicated. A young Milanese novelist, Corrado Silla, has been invited by Count Cesare d'Ormengo to visit the latter's palace on Segrino Lake, north of Milan. He is met by the Count's secretary, a German liberal refugee named Andreas Steinegge. They hear the wild piano-playing of the Count's niece, Marina di Malombra, against whom Steinegge warns Silla.

The Count turns out to have been an old friend of Silla's mother, and asks Silla to stay and help him write a book. For economic reasons, his niece has had to leave the brilliant society of Paris and to live on her uncle's hospitality in his lonely palace far from all her pleasures. She hates the Count, and spends her time reading novels and – knowing that he hates music – playing operatic excerpts on the piano, especially themes from Meyerbeer's wildly romantic Robert le diable. She also has a boat in which she likes to go for solitary rides on the lake, especially to a mysterious òrrido or grotto on the opposite shore.

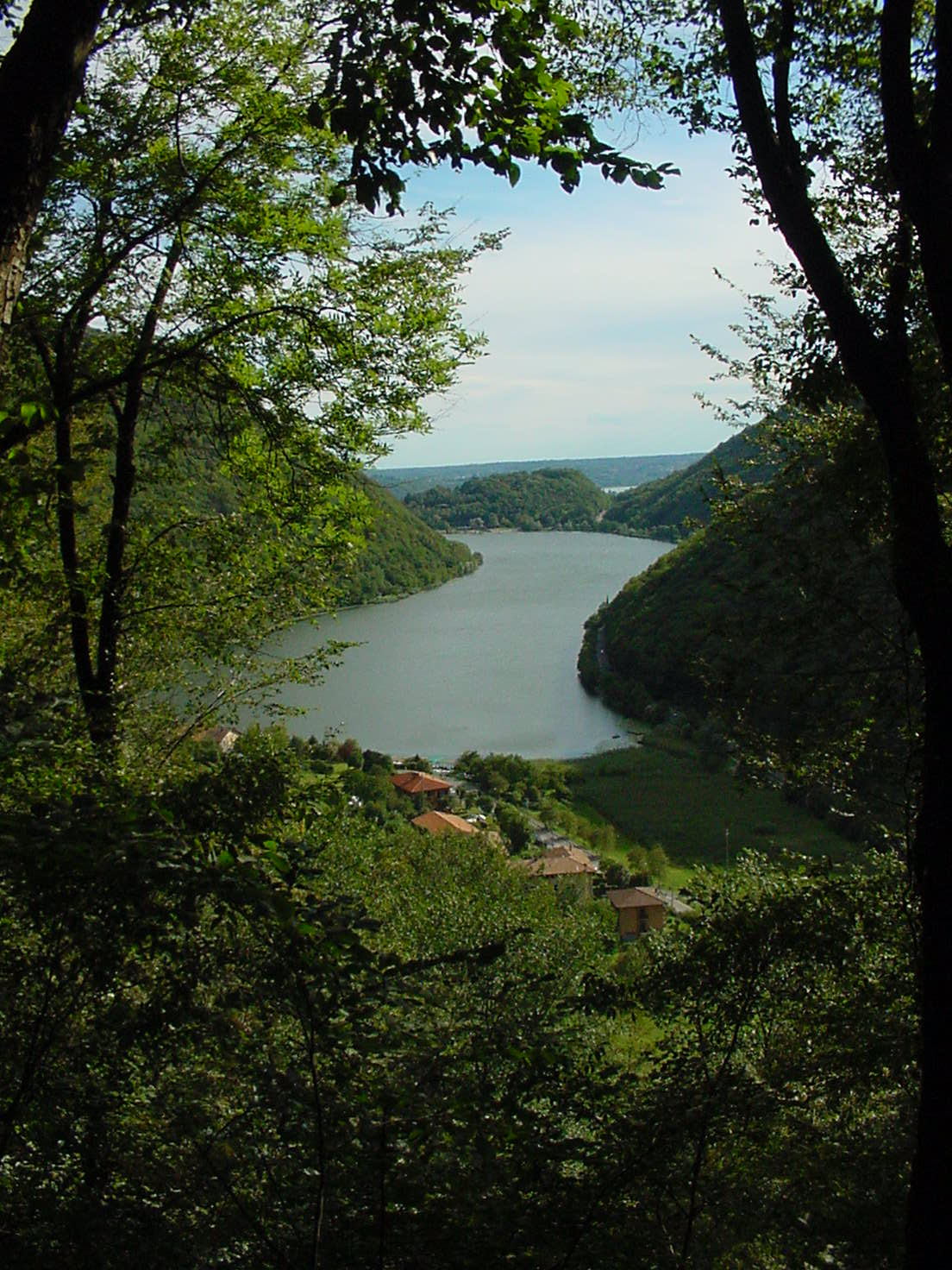
Segrino Lake, the setting of the novel

Marina is at first contemptuous of Silla, but her strangely fascinating personality both attracts and repels him. She discovers that he is the author of a book which deals with metempsychosis, published anonymously with the title Il sogno (“The Dream”). She reveals to Silla that they have already corresponded, since she has written to the author of Il sogno under the pseudonym of “Cecilia” and he has replied. This pseudonym was the given name of an ancestor of Marina's, Cecilia Varrega, who was imprisoned in a room of the palace and so maltreated by her jealous husband, an Ormengo, that she died. Marina has discovered, in a secret drawer of Cecilia's desk, a letter from Cecilia urging the girl in whom she expects to be reincarnated to avenge her on the Ormengo family. Marina is convinced that she is the reïncarnation of Cecilia, and that Silla embodies the soul of Cecilia's lover.

Silla becomes enamored of Marina, who shows affection for him, while at the same time her hatred of Ormengo grows. A young Venetian, Nepo Salvador, visits the palace together with his family to ask for Marina's hand in marriage. She pretends to encourage them in order to shame the Count in the end by a haughty refusal. Steinegge's long-lost daughter, Edith, a pure, angelic creature, joins him. Steinegge, Edith, and Silla become friendly with the local priest, Don Innocenzo, whose high-minded spirituality they admire. Edith falls secretly in love with Silla, but is distressed at her father's loss of his faith. She prays that Steinegge may recover it, and vows to sacrifice all earthly happiness if this comes to pass. Silla is torn between the physical attraction he feels for Marina, and the spiritual love which Edith arouses in him.

The three leave the palace and go to Milan, where, however, Silla is disgusted with the superficiality of the pretentious, empty upper bourgeois society. After a time, Silla, Steinegge, and Edith return to the palace, at a time when the old Count is seriously ill. Marina carries out her vengeance on Count d'Ormengo by appearing in his bedroom at night and announcing that she is Cecilia's reincarnation and avenger. The Count dies of shock. Realizing that Silla loves Edith, Marina's love for him turns to a mad hatred, and she shoots him dead. She then eludes pursuit, leaps into her boat, and flees to the other side of the lake, disappearing in the òrrido.

== Adaptations ==
The novel was turned into films on two occasions: a 1917 silent film directed by Carmine Gallone and a 1942 film directed by Mario Soldati. In 1974 the story was adapted as a miniseries for Italian television.

== Bibliography ==
- Hall, Robert A. (1978). Antonio Fogazzaro. Boston: Twayne Publishers. ISBN 0-8057-6311-2.
- Brand, Peter; Pertile, Lino (1999). The Cambridge History of Italian Literature. Cambridge: Cambridge University Press. ISBN 9781139056175.
- Caesar, Anna Hallamore (2007). "Sensation, Seduction, and the Supernatural: Fogazzaro's Malombra". In Francesca Billiani; Gigliola Sulis (eds.). Italian Gothic and Fantastic. Encounters and Rewritings of Narrative Traditions. Madison and Taeneck: Fairleigh Dickinson University Press. pp. 98–118. ISBN 978-1611473537.
- Parrino, Maria (2012). "Italian Gothic Literature: The Case of Antonio Fogazzaro's Malombra". In Katarzyna Więckowska (ed.). The Gothic: Studies in History, Identity and Space. Leiden: Brill. doi:10.1163/9781848880993_004. ISBN 978-1848880993.
