= The Little World of the Past =

1895 novel by Antonio Fogazzaro

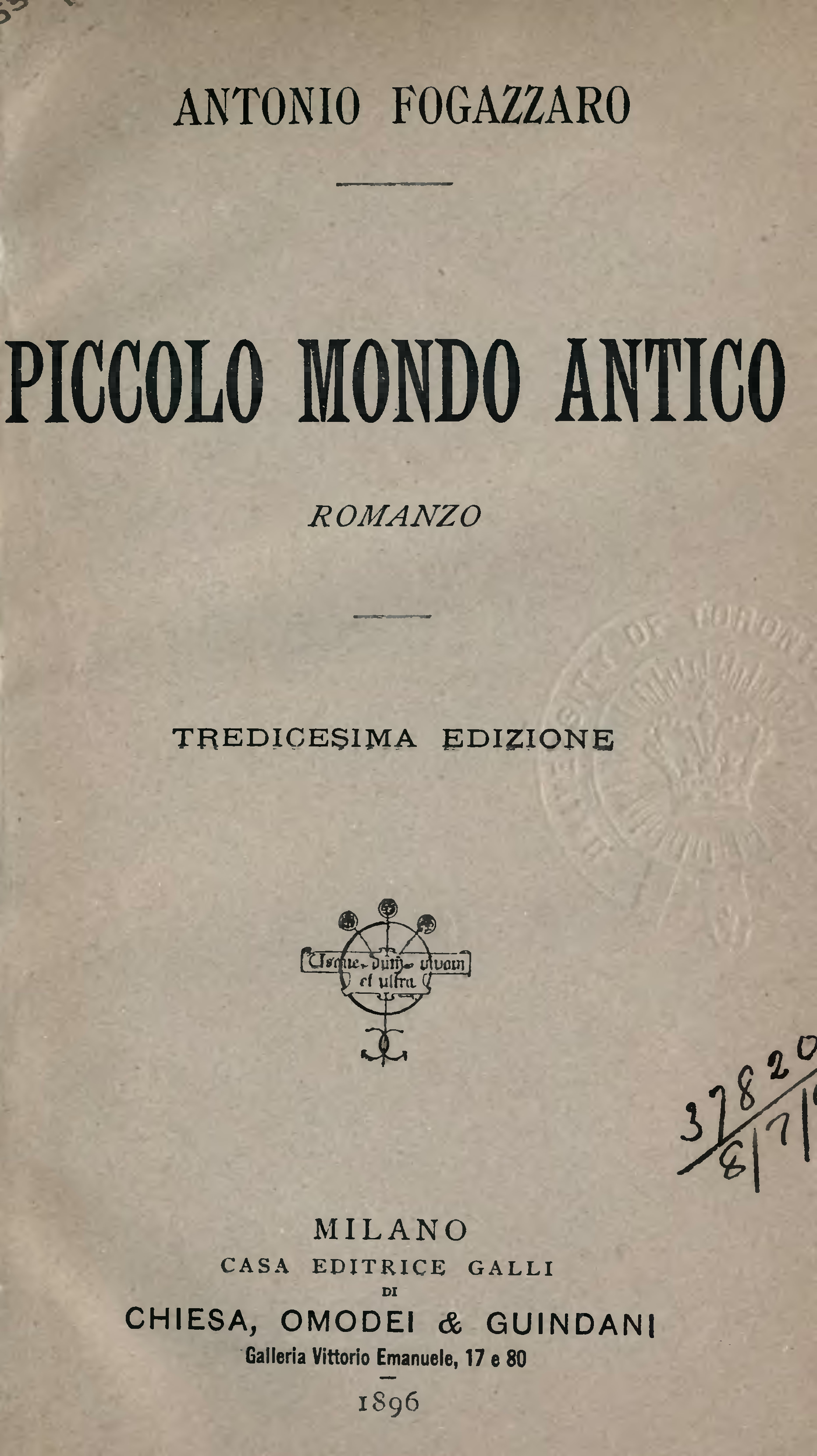
- Frontispiece of the 13th Italian edition, 1896
- Author: Antonio Fogazzaro
- Language: Italian
- Genre: Historical
- Publication date: 1895
- Publication place: Italy
- English publication date: 1907
- Media type: Print

The Little World of the Past (Italian: Piccolo mondo antico, lit. 'Little Ancient World'), also known in English under the titles Little Ancient World and The Patriot, is an 1895 novel by the Italian writer Antonio Fogazzaro. It was the author's most successful work and is considered to be his masterpiece. According to Martin Seymour-Smith, The Little World of the Past "is rightly considered one of the leading novels of the latter half of the nineteenth century: it is strong in characterization, brilliant in its use of dialogue, and, above all, delightful in its humour."

Fogazzaro finished the first draft in 1884, and spent the next decade revising it. The novel has an alpine backdrop, and is set in the 1850s during the Risorgimento. Fogazzaro modelled the two protagonists after his parents.

== Background ==
Fogazzaro originally intended to call the novel Storia quieta, "Quiet Story" (in contrast to the drama of Malombra and Daniele Cortis). He jotted down a preliminary outline of the story and the names of the characters on August 16, 1884.

In 1887 his father Mariano died, and for a time Antonio thought of writing his biography, since he was convinced that his father had not been properly appreciated during his lifetime. Nothing came of this project, but he began to work again, off and on, at the Storia quieta, in which the hero began to assume the traits of Mariano Fogazzaro the elder.

It was not until 1893, however, that Antonio returned to the task of completing the story, which he had, by this time, renamed Piccolo mondo antico, "Little Ancient World." He worked intensively at it during that year and the next, despite various interruptions, completing it on December 31, 1894. It was published in November 1895.

Strongly influenced by Manzoni's novel The Betrothed, The Little World of the Past is considered Fogazzaro's best narrative work, and was highly acclaimed, even by critics unsympathetic to his religious and philosophical ideas.

== Description ==
Piccolo mondo antico opens in 1849, with the hero, Franco Maironi, and his fiancée Luisa Rigey desiring to get married, but prevented from doing so by the disapproval of his paternal grandmother, the Marchesa Maironi. They live at Oria, in Valsolda; the Marchesa, at Cressogno, farther up Lake Lugano. The Marchesa is ultraconservative, an austriacante or pro-Austrian, and disapproves strongly of her grandson's and his friends' patriotic, anti-Austrian sympathies. She has kept secret a will whereby the Marchese, her husband, had left the Maironi estate to Franco, and has thereby been enabled to keep the estate for herself. With financial aid from Luisa's kindly and generous uncle Piero Ribera, she and Franco get married and lead a quiet existence at Oria. A child, Maria, is born to them. From her childish mispronunciation of the name of a song, Ombretta sdegnosa del Mississipi ("Proud little shadow of the Mississippi") which her great-uncle Piero often sings to her, she is nicknamed Ombretta Pipi. The Marchesa brings all her influence to bear on the Austrian authorities to make life difficult for Franco and his family, having them spied on and persecuted for their liberal opinions. One of her agents is a government official named Pasotti, who tyrannizes over his deaf wife and whom the neighbors term a bargniff or "astute devil".

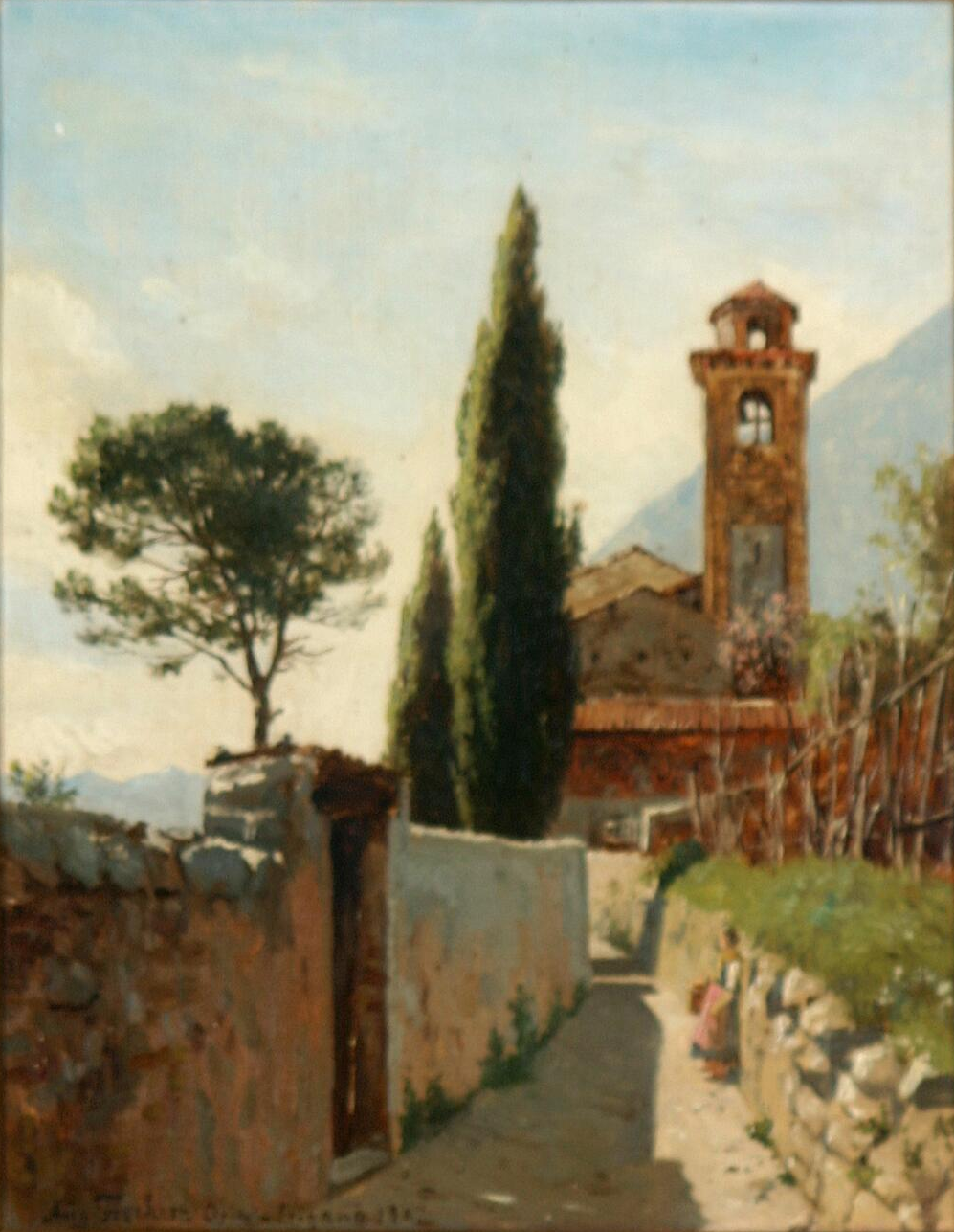
August Fischer, Church in Oria, Valsolda, 1902

A sub-plot introduces the love of Professor Gilardoni, a friend of the Maironis, for Ester Bianchi, and also his possession of a copy of the Marchese's will. He informs Franco of the existence of this copy, but Franco's idealism will not allow him to take advantage of it. When Piero Ribera is, through the Marchesa's machinations, deprived of his job, Gilardoni takes matters into his own hands. He goes to see the Marchesa, but is, in his turn, persecuted by the Austrian police. He informs Luisa of the existence of the will, thereby causing a serious disagreement between husband and wife. Luisa is proud, intellectually strong, firm, and decisive, with a skeptical, materialistic outlook on religious matters. Franco is poetically and musically inclined, vacillating, idealistic, and intensely religious. Luisa urges Franco to take steps against his grandmother, but he again refuses. The split between them is so deep that Franco leaves Oria and goes to Turin, taking a poorly paid job on a newspaper. Luisa, Ombretta, and Piero Ribera remain at Oria, in worsening poverty. Primarily from a desire to see justice done, Luisa decides to face the Marchesa and force her to honor the will. Just as she is setting out, however, the women of the town call her, in terror, to come to the lifeless corpse of Ombretta, who has been drowned in the lake through the inattention of her babysitter. All efforts to revive Ombretta are futile.

Franco is called from Turin by telegram, and returns briefly to Oria (in secret, because he runs the risk of arrest by the Austrian police), Luisa is inconsolable, but the death of Ombretta, instead of reconciling the couple, separates them still further. Franco's religious faith upholds and strengthens him, and makes his character firmer. Luisa, on the other hand, in her skepticism and this- worldliness, has no psychological support in the face of disaster; her apparent strength of character is brittle and breaks under this extreme pressure. It takes her a long time to recover at all from the shock of Ombretta's death. For a while, she dabbles in occultism and spiritualism, attempting to get in touch with Ombretta's spirit. When even this attempt fails, she is on the brink of total collapse. Meanwhile, Gilardoni has won the love of Ester Bianchi, his successful courtship furnishing a somewhat humorous contrast to the vicissitudes of the Maironi family. The old Marchesa has a dream in which she is reproached by the ghost of Ombretta for having caused her death by defrauding her parents of their heritage. It is now 1859. Relations between Piedmont and Austria are reaching the breaking-point; the Second Italian War of Independence is imminent. Piero Ribera is seriously ill and feels the end approaching. He does not wish to die while Franco and Luisa are still separated, and therefore arranges – not without some resistance on Luisa's part – for them to meet on Isola Bella. They spend one night together, and Luisa conceives again. The old Piero dies peacefully on Isola Bella: Franco returns to Turin to enroll in the Piedmontese army in the war of liberation which is just starting.

== Film adaptation ==
In 1941, during the Fascist era, the novel was adapted into the film Piccolo mondo antico, directed by Mario Soldati and starring Alida Valli and Massimo Serato. The film was extremely popular, and came to be seen as a precursor of neorealism.

== English translations ==
- The Little World of the Past. Translated by W. J. Strachan. With an introduction by Tommaso Gallarati-Scotti. London: Oxford University Press. 1962.

== Bibliography ==
- Hall, Robert A. (1965). "Fogazzaro's Maironi Tetralogy". Italica. 42 (2): 248–59. JSTOR 476918.
- Brand, Peter; Pertile, Lino (1999). The Cambridge History of Italian Literature. Cambridge: Cambridge University Press. ISBN 9781139056175.
- Sgroi, Alfredo (2007). "Antonio Fogazzaro (1842–1911)". In Marrone, Gaetana (ed.). Encyclopedia of Italian Literary Studies. Vol. 1: A-J. Taylor & Francis. pp. 743–7.
