= OK, il prezzo è giusto! =

- Presented by: Gigi Sabani (1983–1986); Iva Zanicchi (1987–2000); Emanuela Folliero (1999); Maria Teresa Ruta (2000–2001)
- Narrated by: Raffaella Bragazzi (1983–1999); Matteo Zanotti (1999–2000); Alessandro Rigotti (2000–2001)
- Theme music composer: Augusto Martelli
- Opening theme: "Hey, it's okay!"
- Ending theme: "Lei Lei Lei"
- Composer: Augusto Martelli
- Country of origin: Italy
- Original language: Italian
- No. of seasons: 21
- No. of episodes: 3,466

Production
- Running time: 60 minutes

Original release
- Network: Italia 1 (1983–1987); Canale 5 (1988–1996); Rete 4 (1987–1988; 1996–2001)
- Release: 21 December 1983 – 13 April 2001

OK, il prezzo è giusto! ("OK! The Price Is Right") is the Italian adaptation of the American game show The Price Is Right that aired on Italia 1, Canale 5 and Rete 4. It was hosted by Gigi Sabani, Iva Zanicchi, Emanuela Folliero and Maria Teresa Ruta with the first version being hosted by a man (Sabani) then the later three versions were hosted by women (Zanicchi, Folliero and Ruta respectively) with Zanicchi being the longest-running to hold the title for 13 years.. It first premiered on 21 December 1983 and went off the air on 13 April 2001. With 3,466 episodes it is the third longest running quiz on Italian TV, after L'eredità (The Inheritance) and La ruota della fortuna (The Wheel of Fortune). The show used similar gameplay format to the American version, although at the two last seasons altered the format to use the British One-Player showcase format. It is the only version to feature an all female cast.

Zanicchi, Folliero, and Ruta's tenures as hosts make the Italian version of one only three versions of the show to be hosted by a woman. However, the first host of the show was a man (Sabani).

On 2026, the game show will be back on Canale 5 hosted by Ilary Blasi from 7 December.

== Pricing Games ==
The name of the original pricing game in the US version (or in the case of Le Bowling, the French version) is given in parentheses. Many of these follow the same rules and gameplay as the US version; for details, see List of The Price Is Right pricing games.

- 10 Chances (Ten Chances)
- 2 Al Prezzo di 1 (2 For The Price Of 1)
- 2 Metà (Money Game)
- 3 X (3 Strikes)
- Abbinamento (It's in the Bag)
- Accoppiata (Pick-A-Pair)
- Alveare (Spelling Bee)
- Assegno in Bianco (Check Game)
- Astronave (On The Nose)
- Black-Jack (Hit Me)
- Blocca il Prezzo (Freeze Frame)
- Bowling (Le Bowling)
- Cambio (Switcheroo)
- Campana (One Away)
- Caro Prezzo (Most Expensive)
- Carta Di Credito (Credit Card)
- Carta Vincente (Card Game)
- Cassaforte (Safe Crackers)
- Centro (Bullseye)
- Check-Out
- Chiave Magica (Master Key)
- Colpo Sicuro (Hole In One)
- Conchiglia (Shell Game)
- Corsa Al Prezzo (Race Game)
- Cover Up
- Esploratore (Pathfinder)
- Formichina (Super Saver)
- Fai La Mossa Giusta (Make Your Move)
- Febbre Dell'Oro (Range Game)
- Gioco dei Dadi (Dice Game)
- Gioco dell'8 (Lucky Seven)
- Grande Gioco/Vinci Gli Zeri (Grand Game, Lit. 5,000,000 or Lit. 10,000,000 top prize.)
- Il Tempo è Denaro (Clock Game)
- Inflazione (Now...Or Then)
- Jolly (Bonus Game)
- Jukebox (Le Jukebox)
- Mini Market (Grocery Game)
- Numero Magico (Magic Number)
- Occhio Al Prezzo (I) (Double Prices)
- Occhio Al Prezzo (II) (One Right Price)
- Offerta Speciale (Barker's Bargain Bar)
- Più o Meno (Hi-Lo)
- Poker (Poker Game)
- Plinko (Lit. 5,000,000 top prize. Also, contestants can have a chance to win a car if scored Lit. 2,000,000 or more.)
- Prendere o Lasciare (Give Or Keep)
- Prova del 5 (Five Price Tags)
- Punchingball (Punch-A-Bunch)
- Salvadanaio (Any Number)
- Scogliera (Cliff Hangers)
- Solo Due (Take Two)
- Squeeze (Squeeze Play)
- Superball
- Telefono Casa (Phone Home Game)
- Tentazione (Temptation)
- Trappola (Danger Price)
- Tris (Secret X)
- Via Dell'Oro (Golden Road)

=== OK! Exclusives ===
- Chi Dei Due
- Girasole (Lit. 5,000,000 top prize)
- Gran Menù
- Le Stelle In Gioco
- Super Vincita

== Showcase Showdown ==
The Big Wheel in the Italian version is played the same as in the US version (after expanded to 1 hour in 1975). The bonus for 100 points in one spin was Lit. 1,000,000 (€516.46). Both winners play the Showcase (in the 2-player version); since 1999, after 2 SCSDs, the two winners must play a spin-off to determine who will play the Showcase (in the 1-player version).

== Showcase ==
The showcase was largely played like the American Version, hoping that the contestant make the closest bid without going over, and awarding both showcases to a player who came within Lit. 100,000. Starting in 1999, the showcase was played in the same way of the UK/European version, with random ranges between Lit. 500,000 (€258.23) and Lit. 2,500,000 (€1291.15); contestants would randomly select one of these ranges, hoping that their bid fell within the selected range of the actual price without going over. If it did, they won the showcase.

== Seasons ==
Season	Start date	End date	Channel	Episodes	Timeslot
1	21 December 1983	4 July 1984	Italia 1	28	Wed, prime time
2	12 September 1984	26 June 1985	Italia 1	32	Wed, prime time
3	2 October 1985	25 June 1986	Italia 1	38	Wed, prime time
4	10 September 1986	3 June 1987	Italia 1	37	Wed, prime time
5	9 September 1987	29 June 1988	Rete 4	40	Wed, prime time
*	27 September 1987	29 May 1988	Canale 5	36	Sun, OK Junior
6	26 September 1988	24 June 1989	Canale 5	223	daytime
*	28 June 1989	30 August 1989	Canale 5	10	Wed, prime time “Summer Edition”
7	4 September 1989	30 June 1990	Canale 5	299	daytime
8	10 September 1990	30 June 1991	Canale 5	291	daytime
*	26 December 1990	2 January 1991	Rete 4	2	Wed, prime time “Celebrities Special”
9	9 September 1991	12 September 1992	Canale 5	328	daytime
*	11 January 1992	22 February 1992	Rete 4	7	Sat, prime time “Sabato OK”
10	14 September 1992	11 September 1993	Canale 5	311	daytime
11	13 September 1993	9 July 1994	Canale 5	256	daytime
12	19 September 1994	29 July 1995	Canale 5	270	daytime
13	11 September 1995	29 June 1996	Canale 5	252	daytime
14	9 September 1996	27 June 1997	Rete 4	212	daytime
15	8 September 1997	26 June 1998	Rete 4	222	daytime
16	14 September 1998	25 June 1999	Rete 4	205	daytime
17	13 September 1999	30 June 2000	Rete 4	210	daytime
18	11 September 2000	13 April 2001	Rete 4	157	daytime
