= Antonio Fogazzaro =

Italian novelist (1842–1911)

Antonio Fogazzaro OCI, OSML
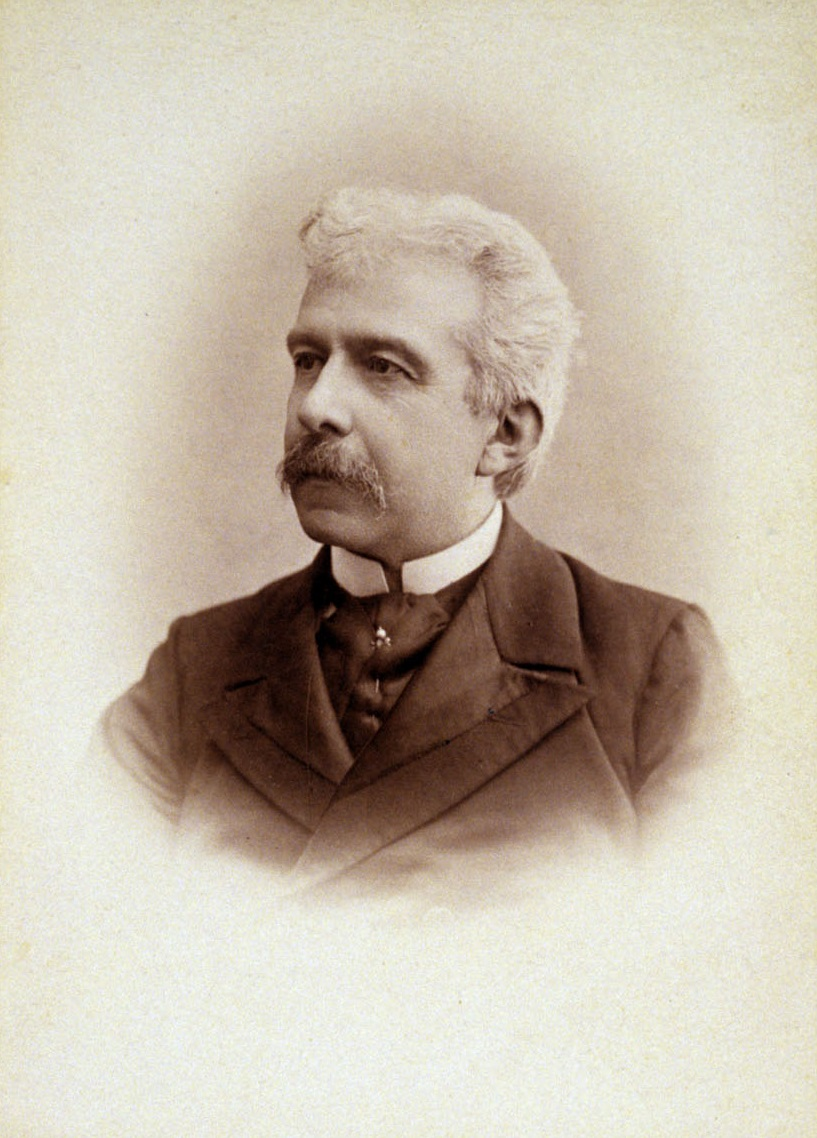
- Portrait of Antonio Fogazzaro, c. 1900

Senator of the Kingdom of Italy
- In office 25 October 1896 – 7 March 1911
- Monarch: Umberto I of Italy

Personal details
- Born: 25 March 1842 Vicenza, Lombardy–Venetia, Austrian Empire
- Died: 7 March 1911 (aged 68) Vicenza, Veneto, Kingdom of Italy
- Resting place: Cimitero Maggiore, Vicenza
- Spouse: Margherita Valmarana (m. 1866)
- Parent(s): Mariano Fogazzaro and Teresa Barrera
- Occupation: Poet; novelist
- Writing career
- Years active: 1874–1911
- Period: 19th century
- Genres: Historical fiction, poetry
- Subjects: Religion, politics, history
- Notable work: The Little World of the Past (1895) The Saint (1905)
- Literary movement: Decadent movement

Signature
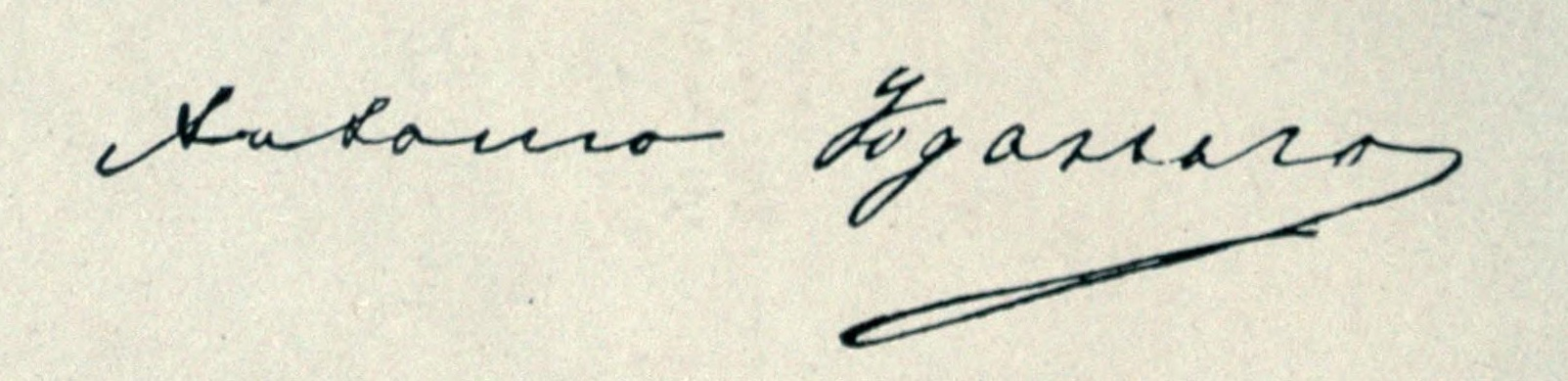

Antonio Fogazzaro (Italian pronunciation: [anˈtɔːnjo foɡatˈtsaːro]; 25 March 1842 – 7 March 1911) was an Italian novelist and proponent of Liberal Catholicism. Fogazzaro has been called "the most eminent Italian novelist since Manzoni." He was nominated for the Nobel Prize in Literature seven times. In Fogazzaro's work there is a constant conflict between sense of duty and passions, faith and reason. In some cases this brings the tormented soul of characters into mystic experiences.

== Biography ==
=== Early life and education ===
Fogazzaro was born in Vicenza to a wealthy family of industrialists. His father, Mariano, was a devout Catholic and a fervent Italian patriot who, in 1860, was compelled to emigrate, together with his family, to Turin, where they lived for some years in exile. In 1866, Mariano Fogazzaro was elected to the Chamber of Deputies.

As a schoolboy, Antonio read extensively in Italian and learned French and Latin well. For two years (1856–58) he was a student in the liceo (roughly equivalent to our senior high school), where his chief teacher was the poet-priest Giacomo Zanella. From Zanella, the adolescent Fogazzaro learned to love the romantic aspects of Virgil and of German poetry, especially Heine (whom Antonio first read in a French translation). Later, he acquired a thorough knowledge of both German and English, in which latter language he frequently read the Bible.

In obedience to his father's wishes, he studied law at the University of Turin, where he obtained his degree in 1864. In 1865, the Fogazzaro family moved to Milan where Antonio married a noblewoman, Margherita Lampertico di Valmanara. In 1868, he passed his final examinations as a lawyer.

Milan was the most cosmopolitan city of northern Italy, with a greater range of cultural attractions and stimulating society than even Turin, to say nothing of smaller, staid provincial centers like Vicenza. Fogazzaro seized the opportunity to come into contact with several brilliant artists and writers. He had the opportunity to hear many operas at the famous opera house La Scala, befriended Arrigo Boito and participated in the Scapigliatura, a movement of Bohemian writers, poets, and artists. In 1866 he returned to Vicenza, which remained his principal residence for the rest of his life.

=== Conversion and early works ===
In 1873, after a long inner process of self-criticism and revision of his religious beliefs, Fogazzaro reconverted to Catholicism. In the same period he began his literary career. Perhaps as early as 1869, in addition to writing individual poems, Fogazzaro planned a longer narrative work in verse, Miranda. The writing of Miranda was one of his major occupations during 1872 and 1873; he completed it in November of the latter year. Miranda was published in May, 1874. It was received for the most part favorably – more, perhaps, by the reading public than by the critics – but in any case enough so that it was eventually translated into four foreign languages and went into twenty-four editions.

After Miranda and the lyrics of Valsolda (1876; republished in 1886 with considerable additions) – Fogazzaro published a first novel Malombra in 1881. It is a remarkable exercise in late romantic horror, telling of the love of a feeble aesthete (in effect a self-representation) for the beautiful, passionate, and ultimately deranged and evil Marina di Malombra. The novel was an immediate success and earned high praise from many of Fogazzaro's contemporaries, including his fellow-novelist Giovanni Verga, and, slightly later, the poet and dramatist Giuseppe Giacosa.

Subsequent novels were in a more realistic mode, though Fogazzaro was opposed to what he saw as the aesthetic ugliness and Socialist implications of verismo proper. Daniele Cortis (1885) uses a politician protagonist to voice ideas on the need to separate Church and state, with at the same time the moral authority of the Church being preserved as a force for order and as a protection against socialism. The novel was a success, no doubt mostly because it also represents the torments of its hero as lover, forced by his own morality to renounce (or postpone) the love he feels on this earth for the married Elena.

=== The Little World of the Past ===
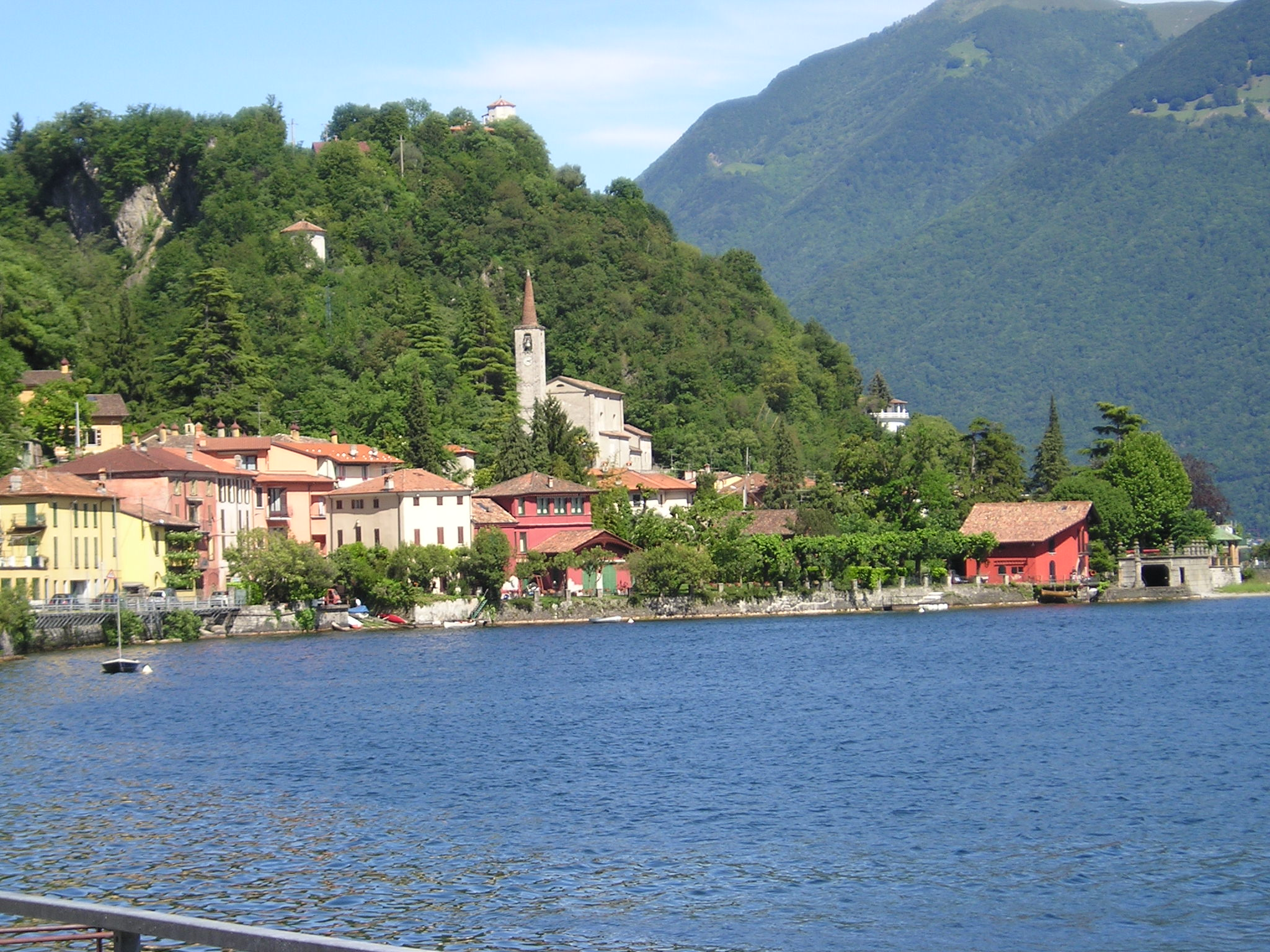
Valsolda

The demands of love and morality, shorn of the political dimension, are taken up in Il mistero del poeta (1888). Both areas of concern return in Fogazzaro's masterpiece, The Little World of the Past (1895). The novel is set in the 1850s in Valsolda, a small community on the shores of Lake Lugano where Fogazzaro spent most of his life.

The subject matter of the novel is the struggle and contrast between Franco Maironi, a deeply religious, sensitive, poetic dreamer with a rather weak character, and his wife Luisa Rigey, a woman of great moral strength with a keen sense of justice, but possessing no great degree of religious faith. The contrast between their respective characters is progressively emphasized by the author in their reactions to the misfortunes and unjust persecutions that hound them. In the end, however, through understanding and courageous, honest participation in the business of living they succeed in achieving a mutually satisfactory integration of their personalities.

The Little World of the Past has delightful evocations of the landscape, and strong characterizations which reveal the inner psychological turmoil of the characters. Upon its first publication the novel obtained considerable literary success with critics and public alike, and gained universal popularity when it was discovered and taken up by French critics in 1896. In 1896, the Crown appointed Fogazzaro a senator of the Realm, but, because of his low tax assessment, he was admitted to the House only in 1900.

=== Church's condemnation and later works ===
From the early 1890s onwards Fogazzaro concerned himself particularly with Darwinian ideas of evolution. Though execrating the dependence of the world on science, he nonetheless accepted its new theories - principally that of evolution - and found in it the proof that mankind was making a constant progression to greater perfection and spirituality. He gave public lectures, upholding the basic reconciliability of evolution with the Catholic faith, and suggesting that mankind, rather than "descending" from the ape, was "ascending'' in the course of its development towards the divine. For most of his career he struggled to harmonize the irreconcilable, both in his fiction and in the essays and talks for which he also became famous. The latter are gathered principally in Ascensioni umane (1899).

Fogazzaro's next novel, Piccolo mondo moderno (1900), whose protagonist is Franco and Luisa's son, Piero, centres on the problems of modern Catholicism and the temptations of passion. Il Santo (1905), again concerned with Piero Maironi, who has now committed himself fully to the Christian life, explores the difficulties of being saintly in the modern world, and discusses more openly than in previous novels the need to reform both relations between Church and state in Italy and the Church's attitude to science. The novel was an international success, but to Fogazzaro's horror its plainly progressive stance led to its being placed on the Index in 1907.

After the condemnation of Il Santo, Fogazzaro's reputation began to decline. He was unable to take his debate further forward in his last, rather tired novel, Leila (1911), condemned by the Holy Office soon after its publication. Fogazzaro died on 7 March 1911 in his native Vicenza.

=== Legacy ===
Fogazzaro single-mindedly fought French naturalism and positivism. To them he opposed a new romanticism devoid of sentimentality, a world which was complete with both the ignoble and the spiritual, enclosed in the language of poetry. In the face of the currents, he went his own shy and resolute way, sometimes arousing the ridicule of such as D'Annunzio, more often the admiration and friendship of the writers whose artistic theories he was defying. He was pigeonholed as a decadentist writer for most of the 20th century, but his writing engages with important issues and has certain psychological and technical riches not to be found in D'Annunzio or Verga.

== Works ==
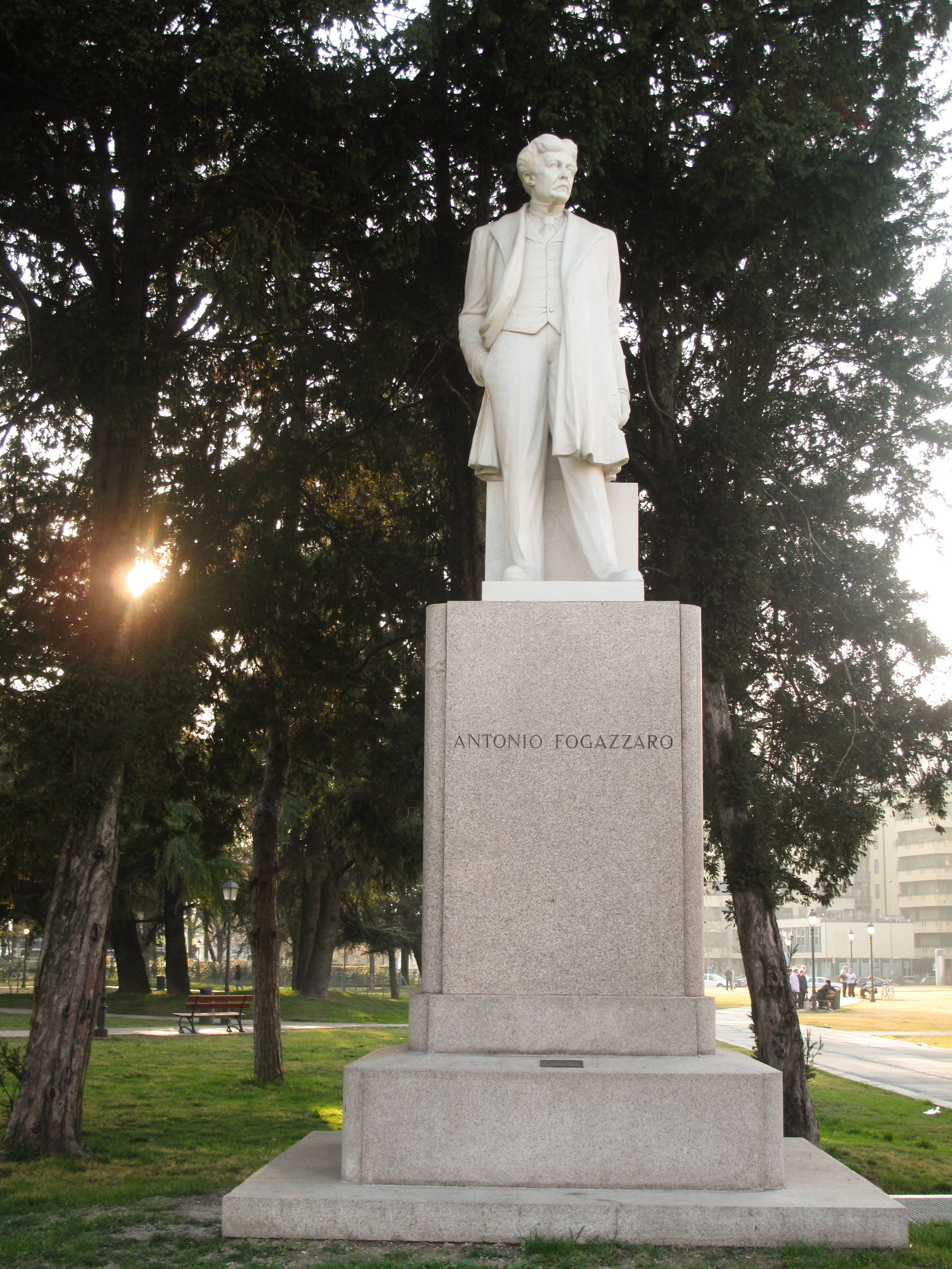
Monument to Fogazzaro in Vicenza

=== Novels ===
- Malombra (1881)
- Daniele Cortis (1885)
- Il mistero del poeta (The Mystery of the Poet, 1888)
- Piccolo mondo antico (The Little World of the Past, 1895)
- Piccolo mondo moderno (The Man of the World, 1901)
- The Poet's Mystery: A Novel (1903)
- Il Santo (The Saint, 1905)
- The Woman (1907)
- The Politician (1908)
- Leila (1910)

=== Other works ===
- Miranda (1874, verse romance)
- Valsolda (1876, lyrics collection)
- Fedele (1887, short story collection)
- Per un recente raffronto delle teorie di S. Agostino e di Darwin circa la creazione (in Italian). Milano: Galli. 1892.
- L'origine dell'uomo e il sentimento religioso (1893, speech)
- Discorsi (1898, essays)
- Scienza e dolore (Science and Suffering, 1898, essay)
- Il dolore nell'arte (Suffering in Art, 1901, essay)
- Scene (1903, plays).
- The Trilogy of Rome (1907)
- Tales from the Italian and Spanish (1920)

== Sources ==
- Eszer, Ambrose (1989). "Antonio Fogazzaro: A Novelist in the Modernist Circle". The Chesterton Review. 15 (1/2): 175–187.
- Hall, Robert A. (1978). Antonio Fogazzaro. Boston: Twayne Publishers. ISBN 0-8057-6311-2.
- McKenzie, Kenneth (1911). "Antonio Fogazzaro". The Yale Review. New Series. I: 119–128.
- Sgroi, Alfredo (2007). "Antonio Fogazzaro (1842–1911)". In Marrone, Gaetana (ed.). Encyclopedia of Italian Literary Studies. Vol. 1: A-J. Taylor & Francis. pp. 743–7.
- Strappini, Lucia (1997). "FOGAZZARO, Antonio". Dizionario Biografico degli Italiani (in Italian). Vol. 48: Filoni–Forghieri. Rome: Istituto dell'Enciclopedia Italiana. ISBN 978-88-12-00032-6.
- Thayer, William Roscoe (1908). "Fogazzaro and his Masterpiece". Italica: Studies in Italian Life and Letters. Boston and New York: Houghton, Mifflin & Company: 1–27.
