= 1958 in Italian television =

This is a list of Italian television related events from 1958.

== Events ==
- 6 January: Aurelio Fierro, with Scapricciatello, wins Voci e volti della fortuna, first edition of Canzonissima.
- 1 February - Totò makes his TV debut, as a guest to Il Musichiere. He appears together with Vittorio Gassman and Mario Soldati. During the show, he cries on air: “Cheers for Lauro”. This was in reference to Achille Lauro, leader of the Monarchist National Party, who at the time of the airing, was accused of serious administrative irregularities as a Naples major. Because of this controversial reference, this very popular comedian would rarely be invited for RAI appearances in the following years.
- 1 February: Domenico Modugno and Johnny Dorelli win the 1958 Sanremo Music Festival with Nel blu, dipinto di blu; the victory of the singer-songwriter Modugno marks a revolution in the Italian pop music.
- 20 February - the journalist Ugo Zatterin announces the closing of the state-controlled brothels. He uses cryptic language and never utters the term ”prostitution”. The episode has become emblematic of RAI's prudish tendencies in this period.
- April 13: in Milan, the experimental transmissions of the Second Channel begin.
- May 25: first political election in Italy after the birth of the TV. In the previous months, RAI is fiercely attacked (mainly by the communists, but also by the right-wing press and by the Republican Party) for its political line pro-government and pro-DC.
- October 24: in Milan, the judicial police seizures the studios of TVL-Televisione libera, two weeks before the announced start of transmission with a show by Frank Sinatra. The estate, property of Italcementi, RCA and other Italian and American partners, had already made, without license, some experimental broadcasts (the first ones on Italy realized by a private TV).
- November 4: RAI broadcasts Pope John XXIII's coronation; for the first time in history, such a ceremony is seen on TV.
- November 18: in Canton Ticino, Radiotelevisione svizzera in lingua italiana begins to broadcast; at first, it airs programs in German language with Italian subtitles.

== Debuts ==
United States - The Perry Como show

=== Educational ===
- Telescuola (TV School) – care of the Professor Maria Grazia Puglisi, supported by the Ministry of Education. It's one of the first distance education experiments in the world, aimed to the young ones living in place without educational institutions, but also to the adults without instruction (like the inmates). The show consists of secondary schools lessons, given in studio to a true public of children, and lasts six years.
- Uomini e libri (Men and books) – first Italian TV literary column, hosted by Luigi Silori, in collaboration with Giulio Cattaneo and Elio Vittorini; thanks to it, many great Italian writers appear for the first time on the little screen.
- Arti e scienze (Arts and sciences) – cultural magazine, care of Leone Piccioni; 5 seasons.
- I viaggi del telegiornale (The news program's travels) – exotic travel magazine care of Giorgio Prosperi and Stanislao Nievo, with the collaboration of renowned directors as Folco Quilici and Roberto Rossellini.

== Television shows ==
=== Comedy and drama ===
The actor Gilberto Govi achieves great public success with a cycle of four comedies in Genoese dialect (Quella buonanima, That dearly departed, by Ugo Palmerini; Colpi di timone, Rudder strokes, by Enzo La Rosa.)

- I fratelli Castiglioni (The Castiglioni brothers) by Alberto Colantuoni, directed by Sandro Bolchi, with Aldo Silvani and Otello Toso; a dead man mocks his two greedy nephews and heirs.
- The sword of Damocles, comedy by Vittorio Cottafavi, with Giulia Lazzarini, Enrico Maria Salerno and Ernesto Calindri.
- Scaramacai, la storia di un pagliaccio (History of a clown) - by Alda Grimaldi, with Pinuccia Nava; for children, in 2 episodes.
- Romeo bar by Anton Giulio Majano, with Ubaldo Lay, Ivo Garrani, Valeria Moriconi and Rentato De Carmine; among the first mystery dramas of the Italian television. In New York, two cops (a man and a woman) and a mystery writer investigate about an amnesiac.
- A doll's house by Henrik Ibsen, directed by Vittorio Cottafavi, with Lilla Brignone, Ivo Garrani and Arnoldo Foà.
- The taming of the shrew by William Shakespeare, directed by Daniele D’Anza, with Lea Padovani, Gabriele Ferzetti and Ilaria Occhini.
- Antigone by Euripides, directed by Vittorio Cottafavi, with Valentina Fortunato.

=== Miniseries ===
- Valentina, una ragazza che ha fretta (Valentina, hurry girl) – directed by Vito Molinari, text by Vittorio Metz and Marcello Marchesi, with Alberto Lionello; musical comedy about time travel.
- Canne al vento (Reeds in the wind) – by Mario Landi, from the Grazia Deledda's novel, with Carlo D’Angelo, Cosetta Greco and Franco Interlenghi.
- Capitan Fracassa (Captain Fracasse) – by Anton Giulio Majano, from the Theophile Gautier's novel, with Arnoldo Foà, Lea Massari, and Nando Gazzolo.
- The Adventures of Nicholas Nickleby - by Daniele D’Anza, from the Dickens’ novel, with Antonio Cifariello and Arnoldo Foà.
- Mont Oriol – by Claudio Fino, from the Guy de Maupassant's novel; first Monica Vitti's leading role.
- Padri e figli (Fathers and sons) by Guglielmo Morandi, from Ivan Turgenev's novel, with Alberto Lupo and Eleonora Rossi Drago.
- Umiliati e offesi (Humiliated and insulted) – by Vittorio Cottafavi, from the Fyodor Dostoevsky's novel, with Enrico Maria Salerno.

=== Serials ===
- Aprite polizia (Open, it's the police) – by Daniele D’Anza, with Renato De Carmine; first Italian detective serial.
- Il teatro dei ragazzi (The children's theatre) – a series of nine teleplays for the youngest ones by Nicola Manzari.

=== Variety ===
- Canzonissima 1958 – second edition of the musical tournament bound to the New Year lottery, the first called Canzonissima; this year, Renato Tagliani, Ugo Tognazzi and Walter Chiari host the show and the winner is Nilla Pizzi, with "L'edera". In the Sixties and the Seventies, Canzonissima will become the peak show of Italian television.
- La via del successo (The road for success) – directed by Vito Molinari, hosted by Walter Chiari. For the show, the comedian creates his most famous sketch, where two passengers on a train have a long debate around the “sarchiapone”, an inexistent animal.
- Le canzoni di tutti (Everybody's songs) – directed by Mario Landi, texts by Luciano Salce and Ettore Scola; variety about history of Italian songs.

=== News and educational ===
- Il pranzo di Natale (Christmas dinner) by Mario Soldati – the writer, after the success of Viaggio nella valle del Po, realizes another gastronomical reportage.
- Viaggio nel Sud (Travel on Southern Italy) – by Virgilio Sabel, on ten episodes.
- Cinquant’anni 1898-1948 (Fifty years) – by Silvio Negro and Gian Vittorio Baldi, first RAI program of historical disclosure.
- Vite celebri (Famous lives), care of Marisa Mantovani.
- La quarta dimensione. Avventure nel tempo e nello spazio (Fourth dimension. Adventures in space and time)- popular science program, care of the International Electronic, Nuclear and Tele-radio-cinematographic Review.
- Uomini nello spazio (Men in space) – program about astronautics, care of the professors Giorgio Alberti and Aurelio Robotti.

== Ending this year ==
- Decimo migliaio
- Telematch

== Births ==
- Paolo Del Debbio (born 13 February 1958) - Italian television presenter and politician.
- Fabrizio Frizzi (5 February 1958 – 26 March 2018) - Italian television presenter and voice actor.
