= The Lion of Amalfi =

1950 film

- Directed by: Pietro Francisci
- Written by: Raul De Sarro; Fiorenzo Fiorentini; Giorgio Graziosi
- Produced by: Mario Francisci
- Starring: Vittorio Gassman; Milly Vitale; Carlo Ninchi
- Cinematography: Guglielmo Lombardi; Rodolfo Lombardi
- Edited by: Ornella Micheli
- Music by: Carlo Rustichelli
- Production companies: Laura Film; Oro Film
- Distributed by: Oro Film
- Release date: 11 October 1950
- Running time: 89 minutes
- Country: Italy
- Language: Italian

The Lion of Amalfi (Italian: Il Leone di Amalfi) is a 1950 Italian historical adventure film directed by Pietro Francisci and starring Vittorio Gassman, Milly Vitale and Carlo Ninchi. After making his 1949 biopic Anthony of Padua, Francisci switched to making historical adventures. Gassman had attracted notice for his performance in the melodrama Bitter Rice leading to his casting in this film.

The film's sets were designed by the art director Flavio Mogherini. It was shot at the Palatino Studios in Rome. It grossed 256 million lire at the box office.

== Synopsis ==
After the Duchy of Amalfi is invaded and conquered by the Normans, the last Duke's son Mauro leads a resistance movement to the tyrannical regime they impose.

== Cast ==
- Vittorio Gassman as Mauro
- Milly Vitale as Eleonora
- Sergio Fantoni as Ruggero
- Carlo Ninchi as Roberto il Guiscardo
- Elvi Lissiak as Diana
- Achille Majeroni as Dino
- Ughetto Bertucci as Luciano
- Ugo Sasso as Attilio
- Valerio Tordi as Pietro
- Arnoldo Foà
- Adele Bishop
- Cesare Fantoni
- Anna Di Lorenzo
- Roberto Risso
- Franco Silva

== Bibliography ==
- Chiti, Roberto & Poppi, Roberto . Dizionario del cinema italiano: Dal 1945 al 1959. Gremese Editore, 1991.
- Moliterno, Gino. The A to Z of Italian Cinema. Scarecrow Press, 2009.
- Smith, Garry Allen. Epic Films: Casts, Credits and Commentary on More Than 350 Historical Spectacle Movies. McFarland, 2015.
