= The Queen of Sheba (1952 film) =

- Directed by: Pietro Francisci
- Cinematography: Mario Montuori
- Music by: Nino Rota
- Production company: Oro Film
- Distributed by: Oro Film
- Release date: 1952
- Country: Italy
- Language: Italian

The Queen of Sheba (Italian: La regina di Saba) is a 1952 Italian adventure film directed by Pietro Francisci.

== Plot ==
King Solomon (Gino Cervi) sends his son, Prince Rehoboam (Gino Leurini) on a spy mission to Sheba where he falls in love with the beautiful Queen (Leonora Ruffo). He tries to prevent a war between their two countries, but after the Queen finds out that her lover is a spy, she leads her army in an assault against Jerusalem. The siege is a failure and ends with the Queen and Prince reuniting with the blessing of both King Solomon and Sheba's advisors.

== Cast ==
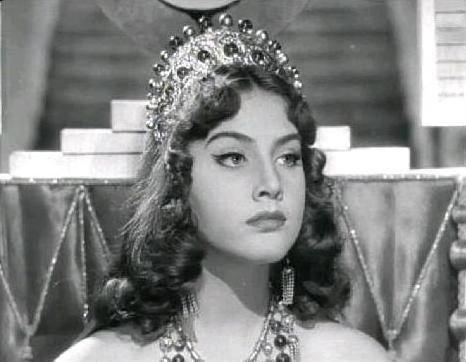
Leonora Ruffo as Balkis

- Leonora Ruffo as Balkis, Queen of Sheba
- Gino Cervi as King Solomon of Jerusalem
- Marina Berti as Zamira, Betrothed of Rehoboam
- Gino Leurini as Prince Rehoboam of Jerusalem
- Franco Silva as Kabaal, Commander of Sheban Army
- Mario Ferrari as Chaldis, High Priest of Sheba
- Dorian Gray as Ati
- Umberto Silvestri as Isachar, Companion of Rehoboam
- Isa Pola as Tabui
- Nyta Dover as Kinnor
- Franca Tamantini as False mother
- Fulvia Mammi as True mother
- Achille Majeroni as Blind merchant
- Aldo Fiorelli as Abner
- Pietro Tordi as Onabar
- Mimmo Palmara
- Ugo Sasso
- Afro Poli
- Cesare Fantoni
