= Dalla Libera =

Dalla Libera is an Italian surname. Notable people with the surname include:

- Luca Dalla Libera (fl. 1990s), Italian slalom canoeist
- Mariano Dalla Libera (born 1964), Argentine footballer

== See also ==
- Libera (surname)
