= Liberi (surname) =

Liberi is an Italian surname. Notable people with the surname include:

- Dawn M. Liberi (born 1954), diplomat, international development expert, former US Ambassador to Burundi
- Marco Liberi (1640–1687), Italian painter of the Baroque period
- Pietro Liberi (1605–1687), Italian painter of the Baroque era

== See also ==
- Libera (surname)
- Libero (disambiguation)
