= Libero =

Libero may refer to:

== People ==
- Libero (given name)
- Libero, codename of World War II partisan leader Riccardo Fedel (1906-1944)

== Publications ==
- Libero (magazine), Finnish political youth magazine
- Libero (newspaper), an Italian daily newspaper
- Libero (web portal), an Italian web portal

== Sport ==
- Libero (football), a more versatile type of centre back in football (soccer)
- Libero (volleyball), a player specialized in defensive skills in volleyball

== Vehicles ==
- Hyundai Libero, a series of light trucks
- Mitsubishi Libero, the Japanese market name of the Mitsubishi Lancer station wagon
- Subaru Sumo, a microvan known as the Libero in some markets
- Yamaha Libero (G5), a motorcycle from India Yamaha Motor

== Other uses ==
- Libero, an alternative name for the Italian film Along the Ridge (from Anche libero va bene)
- A community and music distribution mobile and PC app, launching in 2026
- Libero (diapers), a brand of diapers marketed by Essity
- Libero (ISP), an Italian internet service provider
- Libero-Tarifverbund, a tariff network in Switzerland
