= The Wonderful Adventures of Guerrin Meschino =

- Directed by: Pietro Francisci
- Written by: Raul De Sarro; Alessandro Ferraù; Fiorenzo Fiorentini; Pietro Francisci; Giorgio Graziosi; Weiss Ruffilli
- Starring: Gino Leurini; Leonora Ruffo
- Cinematography: Giovanni Ventimiglia
- Music by: Nino Rota
- Release date: 13 February 1952
- Country: Italy
- Language: Italian

The Wonderful Adventures of Guerrin Meschino (Italian: Le Meravigliose avventure di Guerrin Meschino) is a 1952 Italian adventure film directed by Pietro Francisci. It is based in part on the 1410 chivalric romance Il Guerrin Meschino.

== Cast ==
- Gino Leurini as Guerrin Meschino
- Leonora Ruffo as Elisenda
- Tamara Lees as Maga Alcina
- Aldo Fiorelli as Alessandro
- Anna Di Leo as Costanza
- Cesare Fantoni as King Murad
- Sergio Fantoni as Selim
- Antonio Amendola as Brunello
- Giacomo Giuradei as Pinamonte
- Gian Paolo Rosmino as The Magician
- Camillo Pilotto
- Ugo Sasso
- Franco Silva
