= Giovanni Onorato =

Italian actor (1910–1960)

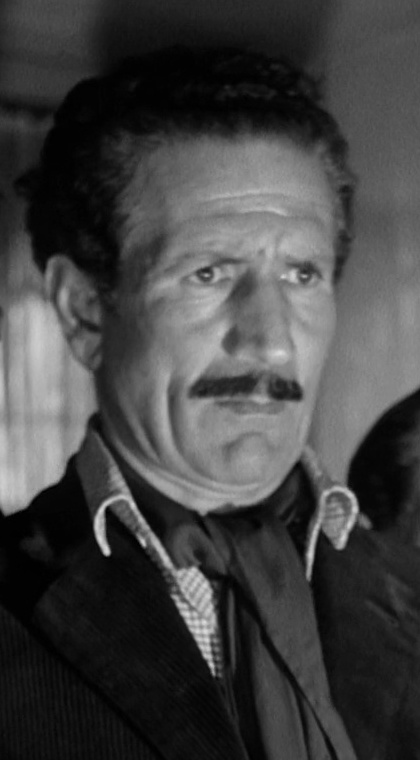
- Onorato in Little World of Don Camillo (1952)
- Born: 7 February 1910; Palermo, Italy
- Died: 23 February 1960 (aged 50); Palermo, Italy
- Occupation: Actor
- Years active: 1931–1956
- Children: 3, including Glauco and Marco
- Relatives: Riccardo Niseem Onorato (grandson)

Giovanni Onorato (7 February 1910 – 23 February 1960) was an Italian film actor. He was the father of the actor Glauco Onorato and the cinematographer Marco Onorato.

== Selected filmography ==
- La stella del cinema (1931)
- Doctor Antonio (1937)
- Ettore Fieramosca (1938)
- It Always Ends That Way (1939)
- The King's Jester (1941)
- Beatrice Cenci (1941)
- The King of England Will Not Pay (1941)
- The Two Tigers (1941)
- The Gorgon (1942)
- Captain Tempest (1942)
- Bengasi (1942)
- Rossini (1942)
- Rita of Cascia (1943)
- Il fanciullo del West (1943)
- Macario Against Fantomas (1944)
- The Adulteress (1946)
- Anthony of Padua (1949)
- Margaret of Cortona (1950)
- The Force of Destiny (1950)
- The Blind Woman of Sorrento (1952)
- I, Hamlet (1952)
- The Little World of Don Camillo (1952)
- Barrier of the Law (1954)
- Don Camillo's Last Round (1955)

== Bibliography ==
- Chiti, Roberto & Poppi, Roberto. Dizionario del cinema italiano: Dal 1945 al 1959. Gremese Editore, 1991.
