= Libera =

Libera may refer to:

- Libera (mythology), a Roman goddess of fertility
- Libera (choir), a boy vocal group from London
- Libera (film), a 1993 comedy film
- "Libera" (song), a song by Italian artist Mia Martini
- Libera (gastropod), a genus of gastropods in the family Endodontidae
- Libera Awards for music
- Libera (association), an Italian association against mafias
- Libera Chat, an IRC network created in 2021 by former Freenode staff members
- Libera Università Mediterranea, an Italian university
- Libera Carlier, Belgian writer
- Libera Trevisani Levi-Civita, Italian mathematician
- 771 Libera, an asteroid
- Televisione Libera, a proposed Italian television channel

== See also ==
- Libera me ("Deliver me"), a Roman Catholic responsory that is sung in the Office of the Dead
- Libera (surname)
- Liberia (disambiguation)
