= Il fanciullo del West =

- Italian theatrical release poster
- Directed by: Giorgio Ferroni
- Written by: Leo Bomba; Gian Paolo Callegari; Vittorio Metz; Giorgio Ferroni; Silvano Castellani; Vincenzo Rovi; Vincenzo Talarico
- Produced by: Mario Borghi
- Starring: Erminio Macario
- Cinematography: Sergio Pesce
- Edited by: Vittorio Solito
- Music by: Amedeo Escobar
- Distributed by: Scalera Films
- Release date: 25 February 1943
- Running time: 85 minutes
- Country: Italy
- Language: Italian

Il fanciullo del West (transl. The Boy of the West ) is a 1943 Italian comedy film directed by Giorgio Ferroni and starring Erminio Macario. It is named after Puccini's opera La fanciulla del West (The Girl of the West ) and is considered the first western parody in Italian cinema and the precursor of the Spaghetti Western genre.

== Plot ==
In an imaginary country of the old west two main local families are in constant rivalry. Lolita del Fuego, courted by the head of a band of brigands, is instead in love with the scion of the rival family, Mac Carey who, through clashes, ambushes and shootings, manages to thwart the gang and to marry the girl, reconciling the two rival families.

== Cast ==
- Erminio Macario as Mac Carey
- Elli Parvo as Lolita de Fuego
- Giovanni Grasso as Donovan
- Nino Pavese as Pedro Montes / Drake
- Adriana Sivieri as Margherita Donovan
- Egisto Olivieri as Carey
- Carlo Rizzo as Fuller
- Tino Scotti as Penna Bianca
- Nada Fiorelli as Evelina Carey
- Marisa Valli as Mary Carey
- Aldo Pini as John Donovan
- Piero Pastore as William Donovan
- Renato Capanna as Sheriff
- Vinicio Sofia as Pierre
- Giovanni Onorato as Black
- Gian Paolo Rosmino as Sorcerer
- Erminio Spalla as Factor
- Giulio Battiferri as Jim
- Luisa Agosti as Fortune-teller
- Oreste Onorato as Bandit

== Release ==
The film was released in Italy on February 25, 1943
