= Rossini (film) =

- Directed by: Mario Bonnard
- Written by: Parsifal Bassi; Luigi Bonelli; Luciano Doria; Gherardo Gherardi; Vittorio Gui; Alberto Luchini; Vittorio Nino Novarese; Edoardo Nulli; Mario Bonnard
- Story by: Alfredo Pondrelli
- Produced by: Giuseppe Amato
- Starring: Nino Besozzi; Paola Barbara; Camillo Pilotto; Greta Gonda
- Cinematography: Mario Albertelli
- Edited by: Renzo Lucidi
- Music by: Gioachino Rossini
- Production company: Nettunia Film
- Distributed by: Rex Film
- Release date: 1 October 1942
- Running time: 112 minutes
- Country: Italy
- Language: Italian

Rossini is a 1942 Italian musical drama film directed by Mario Bonnard and starring Nino Besozzi, Paola Barbara, Camillo Pilotto, Armando Falconi and Greta Gonda. It depicts adult life events of Italian composer Gioachino Rossini. The film is also known as Arte ed amori di Giaocchino Rossini.

It was shot at the Pisorno Studios in Tirrenia. The film's sets were designed by the art director Piero Filippone.

== Plot ==
Rossini is seen during various episodes of his life: in Naples as director of the Teatro San Carlo, then in Roma, his work with his future wife Isabella Colbran; his triumph in Vienna and Paris; the illness of his wife and his work on his last opera piece, Guglielmo Tell .

== Cast ==
- Nino Besozzi as Gioachino Rossini
- Paola Barbara as Isabella Colbran
- Camillo Pilotto as Domenico Barbaja
- Armando Falconi as Ferdinand I of the Two Sicilies
- Greta Gonda as Teresa Coralli
- Memo Benassi as Ludwig van Beethoven
- Cesare Fantoni as Niccolò Paganini
- Edoardo Toniolo as Rossini's and Paganini's Friend
- Paolo Stoppa as Andrea Leone Tottola
- Gildo Bocci as Duke Sforza-Cesarini
- Lamberto Picasso as Col. Negri
- Giacomo Moschini as Duke Carafa
- Gilda Marchiò as Anna Guidarini, Rossini's Mother
- Massimo Pianforini as Professor Carpassi
- Romolo Costa as Austrian Prince
- Vera Ruberti as Viennese Noblewoman
- Franco Rondinella as Don Raffaele
- Oreste Fares as Giovanni Paisiello
- Diana Dei as The Woman under the Rain
- Oreste Bilancia as Her Husband
- Anna Maria Dionisi as Colbran's Maid

== Bibliography ==
- Nicholas Mathew & Benjamin Walton. The Invention of Beethoven and Rossini: Historiography, Analysis, Criticism. Cambridge University Press, 7 Nov 2013.
