= Bianca Doria =

Italian actress (1915–1985)

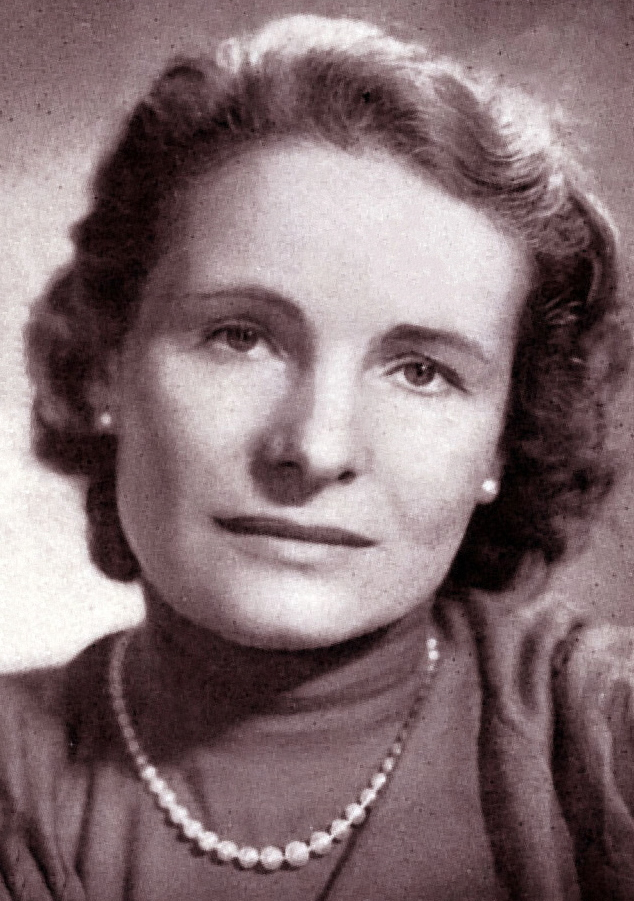
- Born: 22 September 1915; San Gregorio nelle Alpi, Belluno, Kingdom of Italy
- Died: 2 February 1985 (aged 69); Grand Rapids, Michigan, U.S.
- Occupation: Actress
- Years active: 1939–1986 (film)
- Spouse: Alberto Doria

Bianca Doria (22 September 1915 – 2 February 1985) was an Italian actress. She appeared in more than forty films during her career. She appeared in the 1963 peplum Hercules Against the Mongols. She was married to director Alberto Doria.

== Life and career ==
Born in San Gregorio nelle Alpi, Doria studied music, painting and sculpture since young age. She made her critical acclaimed film debut in Piccolo hotel, which premiered at the 1939 Venice International Film Festival and got reviews in which she was paired to Katharine Hepburn. Following the overthrow of Benito Mussolini's government in 1943 she and her husband went to work in the film industry of the pro-German Italian Social Republic in Venice, for which she was criticized after the Second World War ended. In the following years she was mainly cast in character roles, and occasionally worked on stage and on television.

== Selected filmography ==
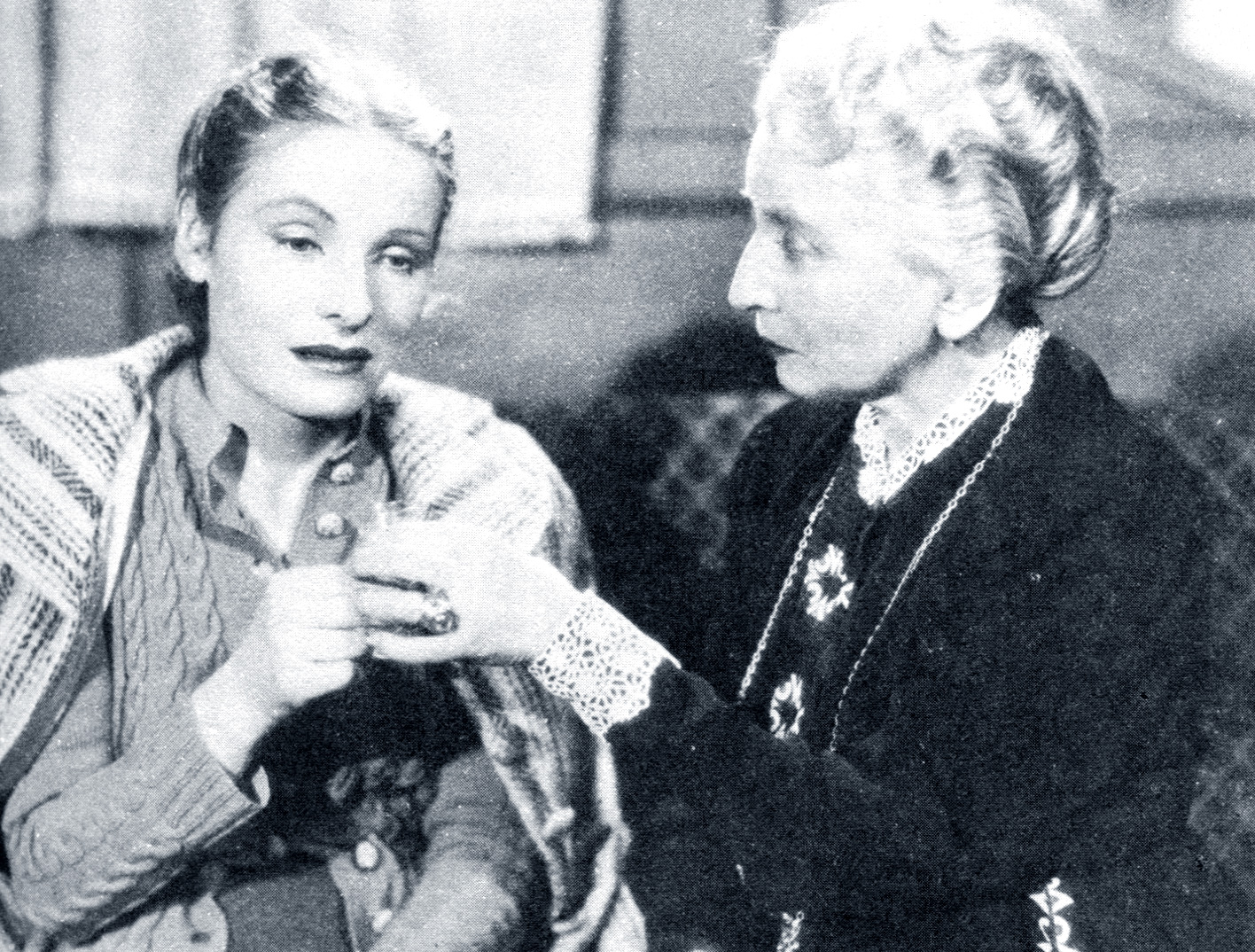
Doria and Emma Gramatica in Piccolo hotel (1939)

- Short Circuit (1943)
- The Monastery of Santa Chiara (1949)
- Stormbound (1950)
- Tomorrow Is Another Day (1951)
- Vacation with a Gangster (1951)
- The Last Sentence (1951)
- Deceit (1952)
- Drama on the Tiber (1952)
- For You I Have Sinned (1953)
- The World Condemns Them (1953)
- Guai ai vinti (1954)
- The Awakening (1956)
- The Dragon's Blood (1957)
- The Trojan Horse (1961)
- Hercules Against the Mongols (1963)
- Brief Season (1969)
- The Hassled Hooker (1972)
- Seven Deaths in the Cat's Eye (1973)
