= Drama on the Tiber =

- Directed by: Tanio Boccia
- Written by: Tanio Boccia; Domenico Manenti; Mario Moroni
- Starring: Renato Baldini; Aldo Fiorelli; Bianca Doria
- Cinematography: Carlo Bellero
- Edited by: Mario Sansoni
- Music by: Amedeo Escobar
- Production company: Aventino Film
- Release date: 1952
- Running time: 88 minutes
- Country: Italy
- Language: Italian

Drama on the Tiber (Italian: Dramma sul Tevere) is a 1952 Italian drama film directed by Tanio Boccia, in his directorial debut. It stars Renato Baldini, Aldo Fiorelli and Bianca Doria.

== Plot ==
Rome, A poor widow Sora Rosa raised Aldo and Bruno alone. The two brothers grew up in different ways, the first Aldo lives a respectable life and the second Bruno has become a criminal in the pay of the Roman underworld boss Totò known as Er Barone.

== Cast ==
- Renato Baldini as Bruno Rossi
- Aldo Fiorelli as Aldo Rossi
- Bianca Doria as Sora Rosa, their mother
- Zina Rachevsky as Mughetto
- Silvana Muzi as Nunziatina
- Cesare Fantoni as Toto aka 'Er Barone'
- Alberto Sorrentino as Saputello

== Reception ==
In his retrospective analysis, Massimo Moscati highlighted the film's strong neorealist influences, particularly in its depiction of Rome. He also noted how the film already features many elements that would define Boccia's later work: "an attention to working-class settings, a taste for melodrama, an interest in the criminal underworld, and a narrative built around strong moral conflicts set in realistic, recognizable settings".
