= Rails (film) =

1929 film

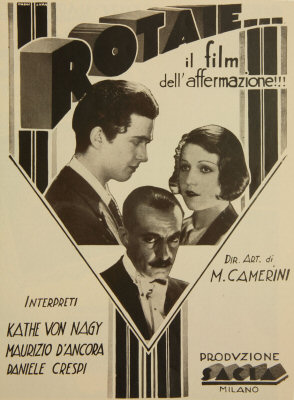
- Directed by: Mario Camerini
- Written by: Corrado D'Errico; Mario Camerini
- Produced by: Giovanni Agnesi
- Starring: Käthe von Nagy; Maurizio D'Ancora; Daniele Crespi; Giacomo Moschini
- Cinematography: Ubaldo Arata
- Edited by: Mario Camerini
- Production company: S.A.C.I.A.
- Distributed by: S.A.C.I.A.
- Release date: March 1929
- Running time: 74 minutes
- Country: Italy
- Language: Italian

Scene from the film

Rails (Italian: Rotaie) is a 1929 Italian drama film directed by Mario Camerini and starring Käthe von Nagy, Maurizio D'Ancora and Daniele Crespi. It was originally made as a silent film, but sound was later added. It was made at a time when the Italian film industry had dramatically declined in size, and was one of only a handful of films released that year.

== Cast ==
- Käthe von Nagy as La ragazza
- Maurizio D'Ancora as Giorgio
- Daniele Crespi as Jacques Mercier
- Giacomo Moschini as Un amico di Jacques al casinò
- Mario Camerini as Un giocatore alla roulette
- Carola Lotti as La ragazza bionda al casinò

== Bibliography ==
- Clarke, David B. & Doel, Marcus A. Moving Pictures/Stopping Places: Hotels and Motels on Film. Lexington Books, 2009.
