= Oreste Fares =

Italian stage and film actor

- Born: 2 January 1885; Rome, Lazio, Italy
- Died: 8 June 1950 (aged 65)
- Occupation: Actor
- Years active: 1921–1950 (film)

Oreste Fares (1885–1950) was an Italian stage and film actor.

== Selected filmography ==
- Before the Jury (1931)
- Venus (1932)
- The Missing Treaty (1933)
- Villafranca (1934)
- Red Passport (1935)
- Cavalry (1936)
- To Live (1937)
- The Last Enemy (1938)
- Antonio Meucci (1940)
- Kean (1940)
- Manon Lescaut (1940)
- Big Shoes (1940)
- Beyond Love (1940)
- The King's Jester (1941)
- First Love (1941)
- The Queen of Navarre (1942)
- Girl of the Golden West (1942)
- Luisa Sanfelice (1942)
- Rossini (1942)
- The Last Wagon (1943)
- Resurrection (1944)
- The Priest's Hat (1944)
- A Yank in Rome (1946)
- The Courier of the King (1947)
- Hawk of the Nile (1950)
- Pact with the Devil (1950)

== Bibliography ==
- Landy, Marcia. The Folklore of Consensus: Theatricality in the Italian Cinema, 1930-1943. SUNY Press, 1998.
