= Edoardo Toniolo =

Italian actor and voice actor (1907–1986)

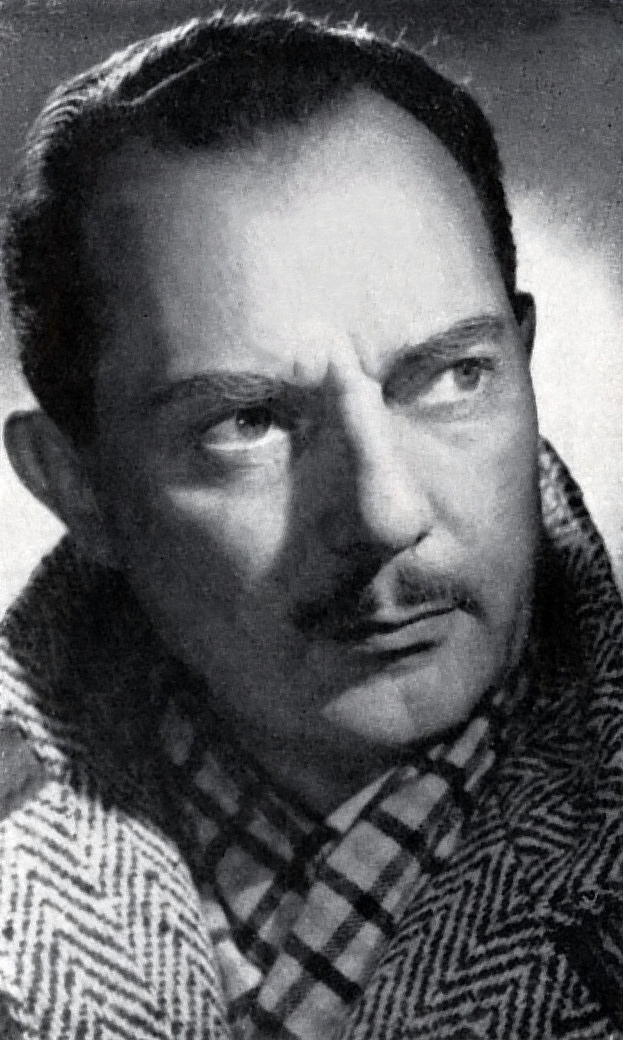
- Born: 22 November 1907; Turin, Kingdom of Italy
- Died: 31 December 1986 (aged 79); Rome, Italy
- Other name: Edward Douglas
- Occupation: Actor

Edoardo Toniolo (22 November 1907 – 31 December 1986) was an Italian actor and voice actor.

== Life and career ==
Born in Turin, the son of the stage actors Antonio and Rosa Rosaz, at young age Toniolo debuted on stage in supporting roles. He later worked on radio, and in the mid-1930s he started appearing in films, usually in character roles.

After the Second World War, and following his role as leading actor in Ferruccio Cerio's Posto di blocco, Toniolo also started working as a dubber, and since 1954 he was also pretty active in television dramas. He was sometimes credited as Edward Douglas.

== Selected filmography ==
- Villafranca (1934)
- Abandon All Hope (1937)
- In the Country Fell a Star (1939)
- The King's Jester (1941)
- Rossini (1942)
- Angelo tra la folla (1950)
- La figlia del diavolo (1952)
- The Legend of the Piave (1952)
- Rivalry (1953)
- Captain Phantom (1953)
- Angels of Darkness (1954)
- Symphony of Love (1954)
- Napoli piange e ride (1954)
- The Song of the Heart (1955)
- Time of Vacation (1956)
- Il Conte di Matera (1957)
- Engaged to Death (1957)
- Adorable and a Liar (1958)
- First Love (1959)
- Queen of the Seas (1961)
- Rage of the Buccaneers (1961)
- 008: Operation Exterminate (1965)
- A come Andromeda (1971)
- The Kiss (1974)
