= Cardinal Messias =

- Directed by: Goffredo Alessandrini
- Written by: Luigi Bernardi; Vittorio Cottafavi; Cesare Ludovici; Domenico Meccoli; Callisto V. Vanzin; Goffredo Alessandrini
- Produced by: Alessandro F. Gagna
- Starring: Camillo Pilotto; Enrico Glori; Mario Ferrari; Amedeo Trilli
- Cinematography: Renato Del Frate; Aldo Tonti
- Edited by: Giorgio Simonelli
- Music by: Mario Gaudiosi; Licinio Refice
- Production company: Romana Editrice Film
- Distributed by: Generalcine
- Release date: 31 August 1939
- Running time: 96 minutes
- Country: Italy
- Language: Italian

Cardinal Messias (Italian: Abuna Messias) is a 1939 Italian historical drama film directed by Goffredo Alessandrini and starring Camillo Pilotto, Enrico Glori and Mario Ferrari. The film was awarded the Mussolini Cup at the 1939 Venice film festival. It portrays the life of Guglielmo Massaia, a nineteenth-century Italian known for his missionary work in the Ethiopian Empire.

== Cast ==
- Camillo Pilotto as il cardinale Guglielmo Massaia, detto Abuna Messias
- Enrico Glori as il re Menelik
- Mario Ferrari as Abuna Atanasio
- Amedeo Trilli as Ghebrà Selassié, il consigliere di Alem
- Berché Zaitù Taclè as la principessa Alem
- Ippolito Silvestri as il re Johannes
- Francesco Sala as il marchese Antinori
- Roberto Pasetti as padre Leone
- Abd-el-Uad as il capo indigeno Abu Beker
- Oscar Andriani as padre Reginaldo Giuliani
- Corrado Racca as Camillo Benso, conte di Cavour

== Bibliography ==
- Moliterno, Gino. The A to Z of Italian Cinema. Scarecrow Press, 2009.
