= The Mad Marechiaro =

1952 film

- Directed by: Roberto Roberti
- Written by: Roberto Roberti
- Produced by: Ettore Catalucci
- Starring: Aldo Silvani; Polidor; Diana Dei.
- Cinematography: Romolo Garroni
- Production companies: Drago Film; SPES
- Distributed by: Drago Film
- Release date: 1952
- Running time: 66 minutes
- Country: Italy
- Language: Italian

The Mad Marechiaro (Italian: Il Folle di Marechiaro) is a 1952 Italian drama film directed by Roberto Roberti and starring Aldo Silvani, Polidor and Diana Dei. The film had a difficult production history and was the director's last film. It was begun during the Second World War and not completed until 1950, before being released two years later. Roberti's son Sergio Leone assisted him as assistant director and played a role in the film.

== Cast ==
- Aldo Silvani as The madman
- Polidor as The old fisherman
- Diana Dei
- Tatiana Farnese as The vamp
- Sergio Leone as American Soldier
- Albino Principe

== Bibliography ==
- Chiti, Roberto & Poppi, Roberto. Dizionario del cinema italiano: Dal 1945 al 1959. Gremese Editore, 1991.
- Sallustro, Enzo. Storie del cinema italiano: l'attore : immagini di una seduzione. RAS, 2005.
