= Virgilio.it =

Italian web portal (established 1996)

Virgilio
- Website type: Web portal
- Available in: 1 languages
- List of languages it-IT
- Founded: 27 November 1996
- Country of origin: Italy
- Area served: Italy
- Owner: Italiaonline S.r.l.
- Founder: Matrix S.p.A.
- Editor: Italiaonline S.r.l.
- Website: virgilio.it
- Registration: Optional
- Launched: 1996
- Current status: Active

Virgilio was the first web portal in Italy. Started in 1996 as a web search engine and web directory manually edited by its own editors, based on the Yahoo! model, it has gradually evolved as a general portal with different content, webmail services, search engine, chat, and a web community.

According to Alexa, it ranked among the top 100 most visited domains in Italy. Before 2013, it was among the top 15.

Local content is presented in over 8,100 portals, one for each Italian town. According to Audiweb in November 2015, half of all Italian web surfers visit the portal each month — over 13 million users.

== History ==
The portal's name is based on Virgil, Dante's guide in the Divine Comedy. Advertising itself as, "the Italian guide to the Internet," Virgil had the mission to complement the search made by a computer by categorizing sites in meaningful ways for Italian Internet users.

In the years of the Dot-com bubble (1999-2001), Virgilio remained in the collective imagination thanks to a successful advertising campaign: an old man wearing a coppola cap with a cigarette in his mouth, accompanied by the advertising slogan "Virgilio, the beauty of the Internet."

Today, Virgilio still provides information content organized into vertical thematic channels; with Webmail, search, chat, and community products.

In 2016, the portal adopted the Microsoft Bing search engine for its search services.

=== Corporate affairs ===
The portal was owned by Matrix S.p.A., founded in 1995 by Paolo Ainio, Carlo Gualandri and Marco Benatti, which since 1999 was controlled 66% by the SEAT Pagine Gialle group along with De Agostini. Then in 2001 it came under the control of TI Media and later in August 2004 by Telecom Italia.

For about two years, from late 2005 to late 2007, the Virgilio portal was blocked by Telecom Italia, preferring its Alice ADSL brand (designed to market its ADSL offering).

On 9 August 2012, Telecom Italia announced the sale of 100 percent of its subsidiary, Matrix, (and thus the sale of the portal) to Libero S.r.l., a subsidiary of Weather Investment II S.à.r.l., based on an enterprise value of 88 million euros. The merger of the two companies gave birth to Italy's leading Web portal, which in early 2013, will take the name of Italiaonline S.p.a., becoming a Società per azioni.

=== Disruptions ===
From 22 to 28 January 2023, the Virgilio Mail service, in conjunction with the Libero Mail portal, also owned by Italiaonline S.p.A., was not accessible. In the history of Virgilio and Libero, it was the longest disruption ever. The company had ruled out, via a statement on their portal, that the disruption was caused by a cyber attack on their systems.

== See also ==
- Libero (web portal)
- TIM Group
- Bruno, Nicola; Nielsen, Rasmus Kleis (April 2012). "Italy: Start-Ups as a Break with the Past?". Survival is Success: Journalistic Online Start-Ups in Western Europe (PDF). Reuters Institute for the Study of Journalism. pp. 69–73. ISBN 978-1-907384-08-0 – via Repubblica.it.
