= Star Pilot =

- Directed by: Pietro Francisci
- Screenplay by: Pietro Francisci
- Story by: Fernando Paolo Girolami
- Starring: Leonora Ruffo; Mario Novelli
- Cinematography: Silvano Ippoliti; Giulio Albonico
- Edited by: Pietro Francisci
- Music by: Nico Fidenco
- Production company: Golden Motion Pictures
- Distributed by: Italcid
- Release date: 2 October 1966 (Italy)
- Country: Italy

Star Pilot (Italian: 2+5: Missione Hydra) is a 1966 Italian science fiction film directed by Pietro Francisci. It stars Leonora Ruffo as Keyna.

== Plot ==
Chaena is the commander of a spaceship from the constellation Hydra, which has crashed on the island of Sardinia. An Earth scientist, some technicians, their companions, and some Asian agents are abducted by the aliens and forced to repair the ship.

With the ship repaired, the aliens decide to take the humans to Hydra for the purpose of genetic research, but while in flight, the humans mutiny.

== Cast ==
Credits adapted from ANICA.

- Leonora Ruffo as Keyna
- Mario Novelli (credited as Anthony Freeman) as Paolo Bardi
- Roland Lesaffre as Prof. Solmi
- Adriano Bellini (credited as Kirk Morris) as Belsi
- Alfio Caltabiano as Artie
- Leontina Mariotti (credited as Leontine May) as Luisa Solmi
- Nando Angelini as Morelli
- Giovanni De Angelis as Giulio
- Gianni Solaro (credited as John Sun) as Direttore Cento Ricerche
- Antonio Ho as Dott Chang
- John Chen as Assistent to Chang
- Gordon Mitchell as Comandante centro Hydra

== Production ==
Star Pilot was produced by Golden Motion Pictures.

== Release ==
The film was released in Italy on October 2, 1966 as 2 + 5 Missione Hydra.

Following the release of Star Wars (1977), the film was re-cut and dubbed in English and released in the United States as Star Pilot in 1977. The film was released on blu-ray by Kino Lorber on July 4, 2023.

== Reception ==
From contemporary reviews, a reviewer in the Italian newspaper l'Unità found the special effects poor commenting that some of it was just obvious cut outs from postcards.

From retrospective reviews, Michael Barrett of PopMatters said the film sometimes felt deliberately campy like the 1960s Batman television series while others were just boring.
