= Licinio Refice =

Italian composer and priest

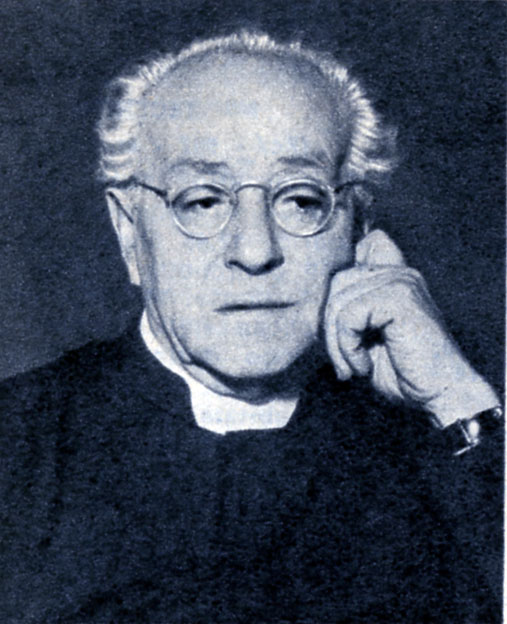
Licinio Refice

Licinio Refice (Patrica, February 12, 1883 – Rio de Janeiro, September 11, 1954) was an Italian composer and priest. With Monsignor Lorenzo Perosi he represented the new direction taken by Italian church music in the twentieth century, and he left the popular song Ombra di nube (1935) as well as two completed operas.

His first opera Cecilia, about the legend of Saint Cecilia, created a sensation with its premiere in 1934 in Rome at the Teatro Reale dell'Opera, with Marcello Govoni as Opera Director; Claudia Muzio took the title role. His second opera, Margherita da Cortona, appeared in 1938. A third opera, Il Mago (1954), was left incomplete (within the first act). Refice died in 1954 during morning rehearsals of Cecilia in Rio de Janeiro; Renata Tebaldi was singing the title role.

== Selected filmography ==
- Cardinal Messias (1939)

== Recordings of Cecilia ==
At least five recordings exist of Cecilia (role key: conductor/Cecilia/Cieca/Valeriano/Amachio/Tiburzio/Urbano).

- Refice/Tebaldi/Ulisse/Misciano/Meletti/Panerai/Neri - 1953, live in Naples – House of Opera (casting inaccurate on their site)
- de Fabritiis/Pedrini/Marini/Misciano/Meletti/Dadò/Clabassi - 1954, live in Milan – Melodram (taping year confused with broadcast year on their site)
- Campori/Scotto/Cornell-G/Theyard/Fourié/Palmer-T/Kavrakos - 1976, live in New York, abridged – VAI
- Paganini/Negri/Barzola/Geraldi/Falcone/Sorarrain/Schwarz-W - 2008, video, Buenos Aires – New Ornamenti
- Fracassi/Gavazzeni/Tomingas/Veneziano/Cappitta/Cappitta/Ristori - 2013, live in Monte Carlo – Bongiovanni

== Compositions ==
- Stabat Mater (1916)
- Pomposia (1950)
- Justorum animae
- Mottetti, varie raccolte
- Miserere
- Magnificat in Fa
- Lauda Jerusalem
- Liriche sacre e profane
- Salmi vari
- music for the 'Inno a san Sisto I (patron of Alatri)
