= Honeymoon (1941 film) =

1941 film

- Directed by: Giacomo Gentilomo
- Written by: Gian Paolo Callegari; Gaspare Cataldo; Mino Caudana; Giacomo Gentilomo
- Produced by: Mario Borghi
- Starring: Assia Noris; Aldo Fiorelli; Luigi Cimara
- Cinematography: Ugo Lombardi
- Edited by: Renzo Lucidi
- Music by: Raffaele Gervasio
- Production companies: Industria Cinematografica Italiana; Iris Film
- Distributed by: Cine Tirrenia
- Release date: 4 December 1941
- Running time: 83 minutes
- Country: Italy
- Language: Italian

Honeymoon (Italian: Luna di miele) is a 1941 Italian comedy film directed by Giacomo Gentilomo and starring Assia Noris, Aldo Fiorelli and Luigi Cimara. It was made at the Pisorno Studios in Tirrenia. The film's sets were designed by the art director Ottavio Scotti.

== Synopsis ==
Despite the disapproval of his wealthy uncle, Mario marries Nicoletta who works as a dressmaker. Needing to make money to live he tries unsuccessfully to work as a car salesman. When his wife is then hired as a designer at a fashion house he grows jealous and overprotective of her.

== Cast ==
- Assia Noris as Nicoletta
- Aldo Fiorelli as Mario
- Luigi Cimara as Valerio, zio di Mario
- Carlo Campanini as Annibale
- Clelia Matania as Anna
- Ernesto Almirante as Ernesto Gelardi
- Franco Scandurra as Pettinelli
- Giacomo Moschini as Bosio
- Olga Vittoria Gentilli as La signora Bosio
- Emilio Petacci as Giovanni
- Diana Dei
- Alberto Marchió
- Tina Maver
- Alma Nerei
- Giovanni Petrucci
- Eugenia Zaresca

== Bibliography ==
- Luciano De Giusti. Giacomo Gentilomo, cineasta popolare. Kaplan, 2008.
