= Leonora Ruffo =

Italian film actress (1936–2007)

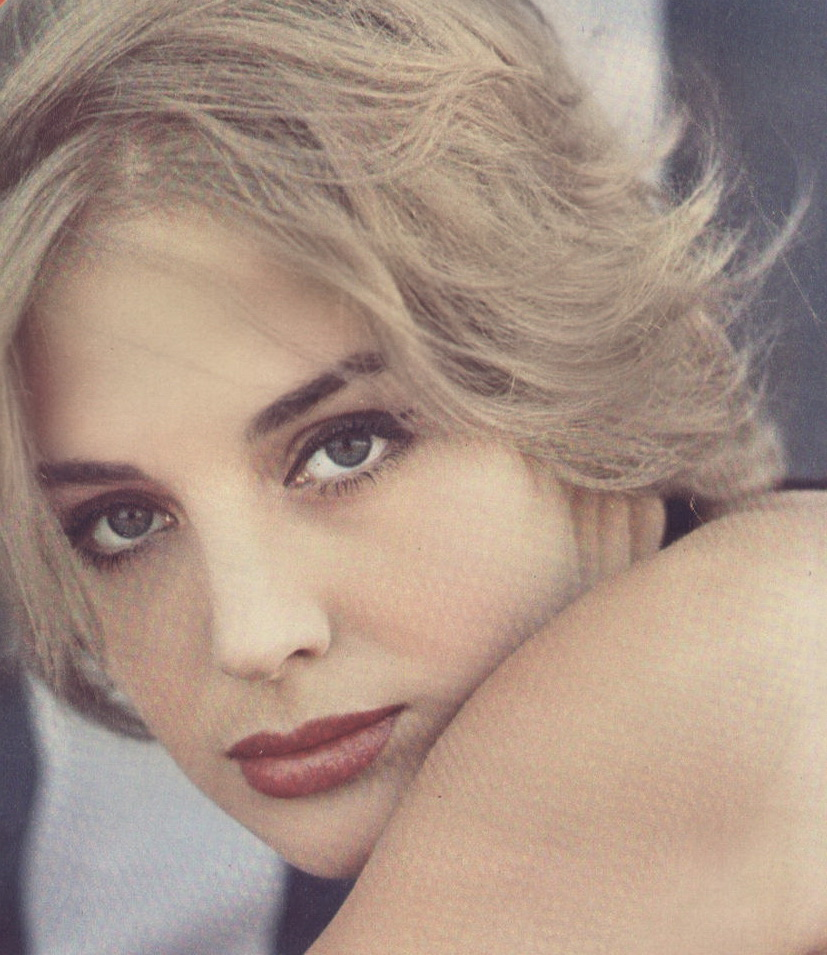
- Born: Bruna Bovi; 13 January 1936; Rome, Italy
- Died: 28 May 2007 (aged 71); Rome, Italy
- Occupation: Actress
- Years active: 1951–1969
- Spouse: Ermanno Curti (1950s–2007) (her death)
- Children: 2

Leonora Ruffo (13 January 1936 – 25 May 2007) was an Italian film actress.

== Career ==
Born in Rome as Bruna Bovi, the daughter of Angelo Bovi, basketball coach of Ginnastica Roma, Italian Championship pluri-winner, Ruffo failed to obtain the main roles in Cielo sulla palude by Augusto Genina and Tomorrow Is Another Day by Léonide Moguy due to the opposition of her family. She eventually debuted in 1951 in Gli amanti di Ravello by Francesco De Robertis.

She was almost entirely active in peplum and adventure films; an exception is her role as the sensible Sandra Rubini in Federico Fellini's I Vitelloni.

She retired from acting in the late 1960s.

Ruffo also starred in a number of fotoromanzi, usually being credited as Bruna Falchi or with the stage name Ingrid Swenson. She was married to Italian producer Ermanno Curti, and had two sons: Stefano and Gianluca. She was the aunt of Claudia Mori.

== Filmography ==
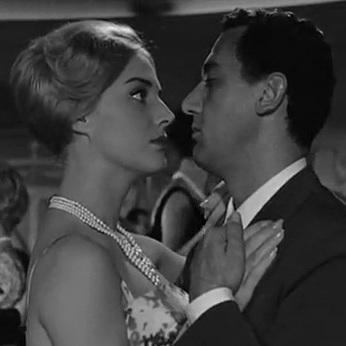
Ruffo with Alberto Sordi in Il vedovo (1959)

| Year | Title | Role | Notes |
|---|---|---|---|
| 1951 | The Lovers of Ravello (Italian: Gli amanti di Ravello) | Elena | |
| 1952 | The Wonderful Adventures of Guerrin Meschino (Italian: Le Meravigliose avventure di Guerrin Meschino) | Elisenda | |
| 1952 | The Queen of Sheba (Italian: La regina di Saba) | Balkis, Queen of Sheba | |
| 1953 | I Vitelloni | Sandra Rubini | |
| 1954 | Mid-Century Loves (Italian: Amori di mezzo secolo) | Contessina Elena Micheli | (segment "L'amore romantico") |
| 1955 | Ricordami | Maria Calise | |
| 1956 | Ciao, pais... | Medy | |
| 1957 | The Black Devil (Italian: Il diavolo nero) | Stella | |
| 1958 | The Adventures of Nicholas Nickleby (Italian: Le avventure di Nicola Nickleby) | Caterina Nickleby | 6 episodes |
| 1958 | Sergente d'ispezione | Giovanna | |
| 1959 | Due selvaggi a corte | Angela | |
| 1959 | Il vedovo | Gioia | |
| 1960 | Goliath and the Dragon (Italian: La vendetta di Ercole) | Dejanira | |
| 1960 | Un dollaro di fifa | Sara Perkins | |
| 1961 | Spade senza bandiera | Gigliola | |
| 1961 | Maciste contro il vampiro | Guja | |
| 1961 | Hercules in the Haunted WorldErcole al centro della terra | Princess Deianira | |
| 1966 | Star Pilot (Italian: 2+5: Missione Hydra) | Kaena | |
| 1968 | Time and Place for Killing | Mulligan's daughter | |
| 1969 | A Woman on Fire (Italian: Brucia, ragazzo, brucia) | Woman in Clara's dream | (final film role) |
