= Lia Franca =

Italian film actress

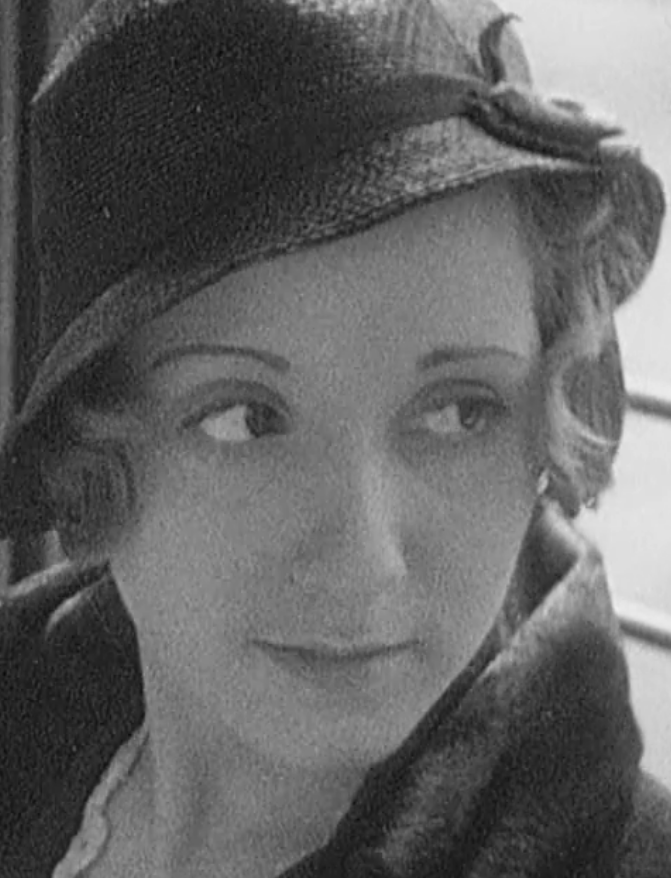
- Franca in the movie What Scoundrels Men Are! (1932)
- Born: Livia Caterina Petra Penso; 1912; Trieste, Kingdom of Italy
- Died: 1 January 1988 (aged 75–76); Rome, Italy
- Other names: Lya Franca; Libia Franca
- Occupation: Actress

Lia Franca (1912 – 1 January 1988) was an Italian film actress. She was sometimes credited as Lya Franca and Libia Franca.

== Life and career ==
Born Livia Caterina Petra Penso in Trieste, Franca started her career winning a beauty contest, "Miss Trieste", in 1927. Eager to pursue a film career, shorty later Franca moved to Turin, where she tried without success to be put under contract from the production company "Società Anonima Stefano Pittaluga", and finally moved to Rome where she started her brief career. She debuted in 1930 with the short film Arietta antica, and then starred in Resurrection by Alessandro Blasetti, the first Italian sound film, thus becoming the first Italian actress to have spoken in a film. Franca is best known for the role of Mariuccia in Mario Camerini's What Scoundrels Men Are!, starred alongside Vittorio De Sica; in this time, at the height of her success, Franca knew and decided to marry the film director Mario Sequi, retiring from showbusinness.

== Selected filmography ==
- Before the Jury (1931)
- What Scoundrels Men Are! (1932)
