= Resurrection (1931 Italian film) =

1931 film

- Directed by: Alessandro Blasetti
- Written by: Alessandro Blasetti
- Starring: Lia Franca; Daniele Crespi; Venera Alexandrescu; Olga Capri
- Cinematography: Carlo Montuori
- Edited by: Ignazio Ferronetti; Alessandro Blasetti
- Music by: Amedeo Escobar
- Production company: Società Italiana Cines
- Distributed by: Società Anonima Stefano Pittaluga
- Release date: 30 May 1931
- Running time: 65 minutes
- Country: Italy
- Language: Italian

Resurrection (Italian: Resurrectio) is a 1931 Italian drama film directed by Alessandro Blasetti and starring Lia Franca, Daniele Crespi and Venera Alexandrescu. The film was the first Italian sound film to be made, but the studio held it back from release and another production by the company, The Song of Love, was the first film to be released. The film's production was troubled and it was not a commercial success.

== Synopsis ==
A musical conductor plans to commit suicide after being abandoned by his lover. However, after saving a young boy from being run over and meeting a young woman who he falls in love with, he decides to live again.

== Cast ==
- Lia Franca as La ragazza
- Daniele Crespi as Pietro Gaddi
- Venera Alexandrescu as La vamp
- Olga Capri as La signora grassa sull'autobus
- Mario Mazza as Un operaio sull'autobus
- Giacomo Moschini as Un gentleman del tabarin
- Alfredo Martinelli as Alto gentiluomo al tabarin
- Aristide Baghetti as Un uomo al 'Astoria'
- Giorgio Bianchi as Altro uomo al 'Astoria'
- Giuseppe Pierozzi as Il barista
- Idolo Tancredi as Un operaio alla fermata
- Renato Malavasi as Spettatore al concerto
- Umberto Sacripante as Altro spettatore

== Bibliography ==
- Verdone, Luca. I film di Alessandro Blasetti. Gremese Editore, 1989.
