= Carola Lotti =

Italian actress (1907–1990)

- Born: Carola Pianotti; 24 June 1907; Stezzano (BG), Italy
- Died: 11 September 1990 (aged 83); Montecarlo, Principality of Monaco
- Other name: Carola Pianotti
- Occupation: Actress
- Years active: 1929 - 1944 (film)

Carola Lotti (1907–1990) was an Italian actress. She was the elder sister of the actress Mariella Lotti.

== Selected filmography ==
- Rails by Mario Camerini (1929)
- The Man with the Claw by Nunzio Malasomma (1931)
- What Scoundrels Men Are! by Mario Camerini (1932)
- But It's Nothing Serious by Mario Camerini (1936)
- Jeanne Dorè by Mario Bonnard (1938)
- Father For a Night by Mario Bonnard (1939)
- Il ponte dei sospiri by Mario Bonnard (1940)
- Redenzione by di Marcello Albani (1943)
- Gran premio by Umberto Scarpelli and Giuseppe Musso (1944)

== Bibliography ==
- Giorgio Bertellini. The Cinema of Italy. Wallflower Press, 2004.
