= Disowned (film) =

- Film poster
- Directed by: Giorgio Walter Chili
- Written by: Giorgio Walter Chili; Federico Galli; Alfred Niblo
- Starring: Alberto Farnese; Hélène Rémy; Laura Nucci
- Cinematography: Angelo Baistrocchi
- Edited by: Rinaldo Montagnoni
- Music by: Carlo Rustichelli
- Production company: Jonia Film
- Distributed by: Variety Distribution
- Release date: 1 June 1955
- Running time: 96 minutes
- Country: Italy
- Language: Italian

Disowned (Italian: Ripudiata) is a 1955 Italian historical melodrama film directed by Giorgio Walter Chili and starring Alberto Farnese, Hélène Rémy and Laura Nucci.

== Cast ==
- Alberto Farnese as barone Giulio Colizzi
- Hélène Rémy as contessina Bianca Maria Sulliotti
- Laura Nucci as Laura Elisa, sorella di Giulio
- John Douglas as Franz Von Klaus
- Vittorio Duse as Filippo
- Augusto Pennella as piccolo Guglielmo
- Amedeo Trilli as padre di Bianca Maria
- Gianni Rizzo
- Renato Malavasi
- Emma Baron
- Giulio Donnini
- Cesare Fantoni
- Oscar Andriani
- Memmo Carotenuto
- Augusto Di Giovanni
- Girolamo Favara
- Pietro Fumelli
- Loris Gizzi
- Lia Lena
- Virna Lisi
- Paolo Pacetti
- Giovanni Petrucci
- Diego Pozzetto
- Paolo Reale
- Ugo Sasso
- Eugenio Valenti
- Henri Vidon

== Bibliography ==
- Chiti, Roberto & Poppi, Roberto. Dizionario del cinema italiano: Dal 1945 al 1959. Gremese Editore, 1991.
