= Gian Paolo Callegari =

Italian film director

- Born: 7 March 1909; Bologna, Emilia-Romagna, Italy
- Died: 19 October 1982 (aged 73); Grottaferrata, Lazio, Italy
- Occupations: Director, screenwriter
- Years active: 1940–1974 (film)

Gian Paolo Callegari (1909–1982) was an Italian screenwriter and film director. He worked on several American films shot in Italy. This included Roberto Rossellini's 1950 film Stromboli.

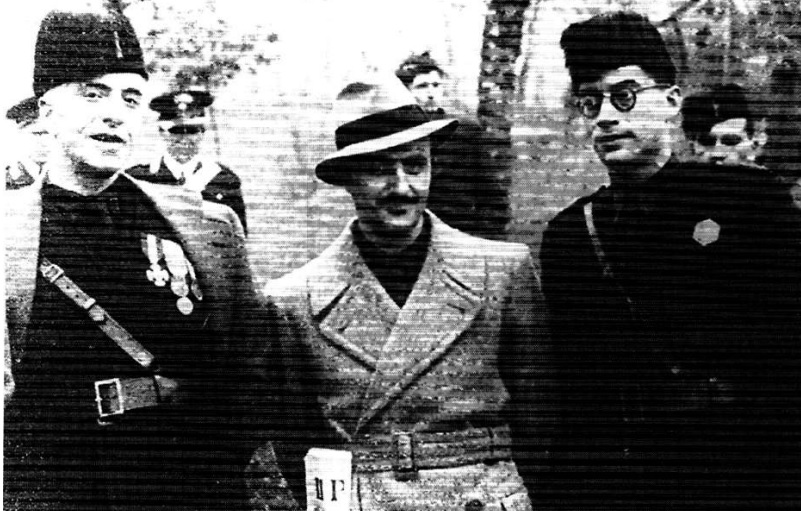
Gian Paolo Callegari between the photographer Vittorio Sella and lawyer Ettore Pistono in 1937

== Selected filmography ==
- The Thrill of the Skies (1940)
- Honeymoon (1941)
- Il fanciullo del West (1943)
- Dagli Appennini alle Ande (1943)
- Resurrection (1944)
- Macario Against Zagomar (1944)
- Ring Around the Clock (1950)
- The Fighting Men (1950)
- Stromboli (1950)
- They Were Three Hundred (1952)
- The Treasure of Bengal (1953)
- The Warrior and the Slave Girl (1958)
- Head of a Tyrant (1959)
- Minotaur, the Wild Beast of Crete (1960)
- Gladiator of Rome (1962)
- The 300 Spartans (1962)
- Pontius Pilate (film) (1962)
- Goliath and the Rebel Slave (1963)
- The Beast of Babylon Against the Son of Hercules (1963)
- The Avenger of Venice (1964)
- Revolt of the Praetorians (1964)
- Messalina vs. the Son of Hercules (1964)
- Password: Kill Agent Gordon (1966)
- Agente Sigma 3 - Missione Goldwalther (1967)
- Il lungo, il corto, il gatto (1967)
- How We Stole the Atomic Bomb (1967)

== Bibliography ==
- Roy Kinnard & Tony Crnkovich. Italian Sword and Sandal Films, 1908–1990. McFarland, 2017.
- Santas, Constantine & Wilson, James M. The Essential Films of Ingrid Bergman. Rowman & Littlefield, 2018.
