= Corrado Racca =

Italian actor (1889–1950)

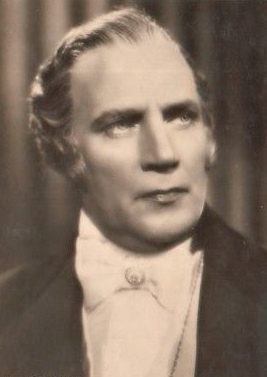
- Born: 14 November 1889; Bologna, Italy
- Died: 12 May 1950 (aged 60); Rome, Italy
- Occupations: Actor; voice actor
- Years active: 1908–1950

Corrado Racca (14 November 1889 – 12 May 1950) was an Italian actor and voice actor.

== Biography ==
Racca began his career on stage when he moved to Florence in 1908. He later worked alongside other stage actors such as Ruggero Ruggeri, Emma Gramatica and Italia Almirante Manzini. On the radio, he acted for the Ente Italiano per le Audizioni Radiofoniche in Rome since the early 1930s. On screen, Racca appeared in more than twenty films during his career. He played the male lead in the 1933 film Villafranca.

Racca also worked as a voice actor, dubbing international films for release in Italy. He worked for the Cooperativa Doppiatori Cinematografici and he often dubbed actors such as Edward G. Robinson, Walter Huston, Henry Travers, Charles Bickford, Donald Crisp, Gene Lockhart and many more in some of their films.

== Filmography ==
=== Cinema ===
- Villafranca (1934)
- The Blind Woman of Sorrento (1934)
- Ettore Fieramosca (1938)
- Cardinal Messias (1939)
- The King's Jester (1941)
- Girl of the Golden West (1942)
- Malombra (1942)

== Dubbing roles ==
=== Live action ===
- Roger Enright in The Fountainhead
- Rowlie in Lassie Come Home
- Looking Glass in Across the Wide Missouri
- John, Count of Luxembourg in Joan of Arc
- Swan Bostrom in Come and Get It
- Roy Bean in The Westerner
- Kris Barden in Blood on the Moon
- Clarence Odbody in It's a Wonderful Life
- Ray Collins in The Magnificent Ambersons
- Count Dracula in Abbott and Costello Meet Frankenstein
- Louis J. Prescott in The Sea Wolf
- Prince John in The Adventures of Robin Hood
- Job Skeffington in Mr. Skeffington
- Dr. Paul Carruthers in The Devil Bat
- Carl in Casablanca
- Sir Guy Charteris in The Shanghai Gesture
- Charlie Chan in Charlie Chan at the Olympics
- Howard in The Treasure of the Sierra Madre
- Pardon Board Chairman in Call Northside 777
- Sam Pierce in Duel in the Sun
- Dan Gallagher in The Informer
- Art Dealer in Prince of Foxes
- François Soubirous in The Song of Bernadette
- John Triton in Night Has a Thousand Eyes
- Pete Morgan in The Red House
- Mr. Wilson in The Stranger
- Scotty MacPherson in City for Conquest
- Uncle Lazlo in Romance on the High Seas
- Dan Cody in The Great Gatsby

== Bibliography ==
- Goble, Alan. The Complete Index to Literary Sources in Film. Walter de Gruyter, 1999.
