= Villafranca (film) =

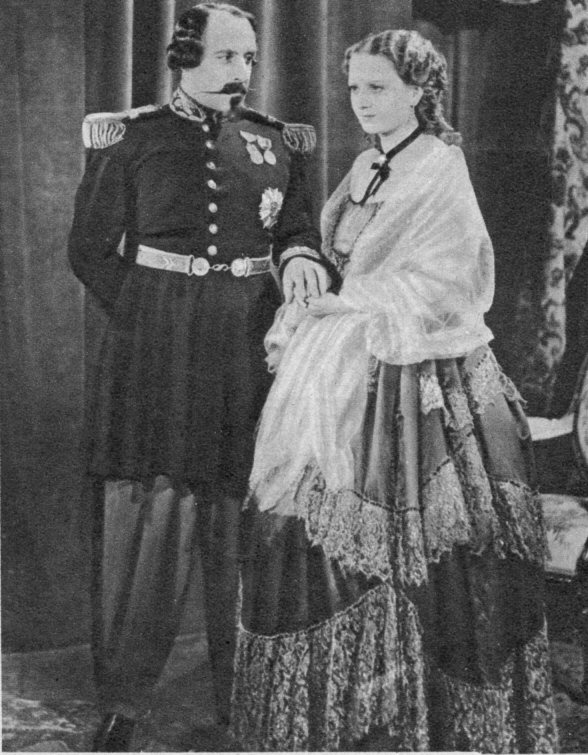
- Still with Enzo Biliotti and Pina Cei
- Directed by: Giovacchino Forzano
- Written by: Giovacchino Forzano; Benito Mussolini (play)
- Starring: Corrado Racca; Annibale Betrone; Enzo Biliotti
- Cinematography: Ubaldo Arata; Augusto Tiezzi; Giovanni Vitrotti
- Edited by: Giacinto Solito
- Music by: Antonio Cantù
- Production company: Forzano Film
- Distributed by: Fono Roma
- Release date: 19 January 1934
- Running time: 105 minutes
- Country: Italy
- Language: Italian

Villafranca is a 1934 Italian historical drama film directed by Giovacchino Forzano and starring Corrado Racca, Annibale Betrone and Enzo Biliotti. It was based on a play by Benito Mussolini, then Italian dictator, about the 1859 agreement between Napoleon III and Count Cavour which led to the Second Italian War of Independence.

The film was made at the Fert Studios in Turin and on location in the city, which had been the capital of the Kingdom of Sardinia at the time of the film's events.

== Cast ==
- Corrado Racca as Camillo Benso, conte di Cavour
- Annibale Betrone as Vittorio Emanuele II
- Enzo Biliotti as Napoleone III
- Pina Cei as principessa Clotilde di Savoia
- Giulio Donadio as Castelli
- Alberto Collo as Il canonico Gazzelli - confessore di casa Savoia
- Giulio Oppi as il marchese Virago di Vische
- Ernesto Marini as Margotti
- Gustavo Conforti
- Vasco Brambilla
- Felice Minotti
- Nino Bellini
- Edoardo Biraghi
- Cellio Bucchi
- Valentino Bruchi
- Isora Cardinali
- Guido De Monticelli
- María Denis
- Luigi Erminio D'Olivo
- Carlo Duse
- Oreste Fares
- Mario Ferrari
- Luigi Lampugnani
- Giulio Paoli
- Guido Petri
- Renato Tofone
- Edoardo Toniolo
- Egle Arista
- Angelo Bassanelli
- Roberto Pasetti

== Bibliography ==
- Goble, Alan. The Complete Index to Literary Sources in Film. Walter de Gruyter, 1999.
