= Pact with the Devil (1950 film) =

- Directed by: Luigi Chiarini
- Written by: Mario Serandrei; Carlo Mazzoni; Suso Cecchi D'Amico; Sergio Amidei; Corrado Alvaro; Luigi Chiarini
- Produced by: Alberto Salvatori
- Starring: Isa Miranda; Jacques François; Eduardo Ciannelli
- Cinematography: Mario Montuori
- Edited by: Mario Serandrei
- Music by: Achille Longo
- Production company: ENIC
- Distributed by: ENIC
- Release date: February 1950
- Running time: 84 minutes
- Country: Italy
- Language: Italian

Pact with the Devil (Italian: Patto col diavolo) is a 1950 Italian melodrama film directed by Luigi Chiarini and starring Isa Miranda, Jacques François and Eduardo Ciannelli. Much of the film was shot on location in Calabria in Southern Italy.

== Cast ==
- Isa Miranda as Marta Larocca
- Jacques François as Andrea Mola
- Eduardo Ciannelli as Giacomo Mola
- Annibale Betrone as Old Laroccha - Marta's father
- Guido Celano as Il sottuficiale dei carabinieri
- Fiore Davanzati as Sarina
- Umberto Spadaro as Scoppola - the killer
- Luigi Tosi as Rocco
- Lamberto Picasso as The priest
- Anne Vernon as Andrea's sister
- Ave Ninchi as Signora Mola - Giacomo's wife
- Angelo Dessy
- Oreste Fares
- Nico Pepe
- Camillo Pilotto
- Checco Rissone
- Alfredo Robert
- Jacques Sernas
- Saro Urzì

== Bibliography ==
- Moliterno, Gino. The A to Z of Italian Cinema. Scarecrow Press, 2009.
