= The Gorgon (1942 film) =

- Directed by: Guido Brignone
- Written by: Sem Benelli (play); Guido Brignone; Tomaso Smith
- Starring: Mariella Lotti; Rossano Brazzi; Camillo Pilotto
- Cinematography: Otello Martelli
- Edited by: Dolores Tamburini
- Music by: Enzo Masetti
- Production company: Florentia Film
- Distributed by: Artisti Associati
- Release date: 12 October 1942
- Running time: 85 minutes
- Country: Italy
- Language: Italian

The Gorgon (Italian: La Gorgona) is a 1942 Italian historical drama film directed by Guido Brignone and starring Mariella Lotti, Rossano Brazzi and Camillo Pilotto. It was adapted from the play by Sem Benelli and is set in the Republic of Pisa during the eleventh century.

It was shot at the Scalera Studios in Rome.

== Cast ==
- Mariella Lotti as Spina di Pietro, la Gorgona
- Rossano Brazzi as Lamberto Finquinaldo
- Camillo Pilotto as Marcello Finquinaldo, padre di Lamberto
- Piero Carnabuci as Arrigo del Coscetto
- Annibale Betrone as Il conte Ranieri
- Tina Lattanzi as La contessa Matilde di Toscana
- Lauro Gazzolo as Il fedele servo di Spina
- Enza Delbi as Bianca
- Gorella Gori as Berta
- Emilio Cigoli as Miniato - lo scudiero
- Giulia Martinelli as Celeste
- Amelia Beretta as Berta
- Achille Majeroni as Il console Marignano
- Cesare Fantoni as Pietro Moricone - vescovo
- Giorgio Capecchi as Capitano Borso
- Giovanni Onorato as Nicastro
- Tatiana Farnese as Figlia del conte Ranieri
- Loli Bonfanti as Seconda figlia
- Amedeo Trilli as Il guardiano marito di Angela
- Raimondo Van Riel as Pietro Capronesi

== Bibliography ==
- Goble, Alan. The Complete Index to Literary Sources in Film. Walter de Gruyter, 1999.
