= Bravissimo (film) =

- Directed by: Luigi Filippo D'Amico
- Written by: Luigi Filippo D'Amico; Age & Scarpelli
- Starring: Alberto Sordi
- Cinematography: Marco Scarpelli
- Edited by: Mario Serandrei
- Music by: Angelo Francesco Lavagnino; Armando Trovajoli
- Production company: Documento Film
- Distributed by: Lux Film
- Release date: 1955
- Running time: 85 minutes
- Country: Italy
- Language: Italian

Bravissimo is a 1955 Italian comedy musical film starring Alberto Sordi and directed by Luigi Filippo D'Amico.

== Plot ==
Ubaldo Impallato is a precarious elementary music teacher, for years in vain in search of a steady job, who to make ends meet with after school. Among the children entrusted to him there is also Gigetto, who unlike the other companions has a singular characteristic: at the age of six he can sing with a wonderful baritone voice. The teacher, who in the meantime has become his tutor in spite of himself since his father ended up in prison, accidentally realizes this extraordinary gift of the little one hearing him interpret The barber of Seville (Ubaldo at first thinks he hears a singer on the radio) and decides to seize the opportunity. Thanks to an excellent performance in a television program for young talents, Gigetto is an immediate success and promises to become a real gold mine. With the help of a theatrical impresario, he is even offered Verdi's Rigoletto, in the role of the hunchbacked buffoon, always in the role of baritone. But at this point the greedy uncles of the child, who previously had refused to take care of him, show up in order to steal him from his guardian and be able to exploit him in his place.

Ubaldo is determined to defend the child prodigy and thwarts their maneuvers, not only for his own gain (with the notoriety acquired he is finally offered the longed-for job as a teacher, but with a letteraccia full of insults he rejects the offer to the sender) but also because she began to grow fond of him. The little one, however, is tired of a life without games and children of his age, he is tired of the greed of adults and fate gives him a hand in putting things right: Gigetto first escapes, then gets sick and has to be operated on at tonsils. However, his tonsils of extraordinary size were the secret of the formidable voice. When later, during the rehearsal of the work, it is discovered that his voice has returned to normal, the impresario is accused of fraud, and no one wants to keep Gigetto anymore, much less his uncles.

Ubaldo, having vanished every dream of glory, decides to accept that last opportunity of the post as a teacher (which he had sent back to the sender by letter) managing to block the fatal letter in time before it reaches its destination. When Gigetto's father, finally released from prison, goes to retrieve the child, Impallato protests wanting to keep the child for the whole school year. But just at that moment, he reveals another extraordinary ability: he knows how to play the piano with incredible skill. But Ubaldo can no longer stand it and invites, indeed, orders his father to take the "monster" back with him before he can really go mad.

== Cast ==
- Alberto Sordi: Ubaldo Impallato
- Giancarlo Zarfati: Gigetto
- Patrizia Della Rovere: Rosetta
- Irene Cefaro: Egle
- Irène Tunc: Dominique
- Mario Riva: maestro di ballo
- Diana Dei: sua moglie
- Gianrico Tedeschi: impresario
- Amalia Pellegrini: la madre del maestro di musica
- Liana Del Balzo: la zia
- Riccarda Momo: Christine
- Rolf Tasna: suo padre
- Turi Pandolfini: Pandolfino
- Zoe Incrocci: Margherita
- Marcella Rovena: la madre di Egle
