= Ugo Sasso =

Italian actor

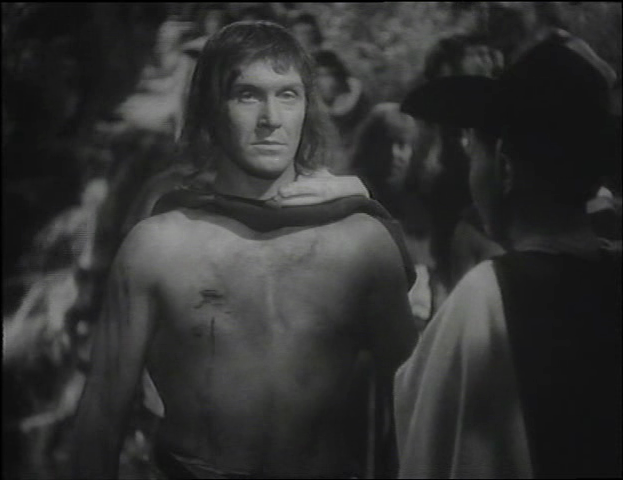
- Ugo Sasso in The Iron Crown (1941)
- Born: March 23, 1910; Turin, Italy
- Died: July 21, 1981 (aged 71)
- Occupation: Actor

Ugo Sasso, born Domenico Pasquale Giuseppe Sasso (23 March 1910 - 21 July 1981), was an Italian film and television actor.

== Life and career ==
Born in Turin, in the early 1930s Sasso moved to Rome to attend the Centro Sperimentale di Cinematografia. He made his film debut in 1934, in Alessandro Blasetti's The Old Guard, and until his retirement in 1973 he appeared in over 100 films, sometimes in main roles. He was mainly active in the adventure, historical and peplum film genres. Also active on television, he was sometimes credited as Hugo Arden.

== Selected filmography ==
- The Amnesiac (1936)
- Joe the Red (1936)
- Tonight at Eleven (1938)
- Guest for One Night (1939)
- The Prisoner of Santa Cruz (1941)
- Light in the Darkness (1941)
- Rita of Cascia (1943)
- La Fornarina (1944)
- The Ten Commandments (1945)
- Les Misérables (1948)
- Anthony of Padua (1949)
- The Lion of Amalfi (1950)
- Figaro Here, Figaro There (1950)
- Cavalcade of Heroes (1950)
- The Wonderful Adventures of Guerrin Meschino (1951)
- The Queen of Sheba (1952)
- Altri tempi (1952)
- Prisoner in the Tower of Fire (1952)
- Disowned (1954)
- The Lovers of Manon Lescaut (1954)
- Girls of Today (1955)
- The Two Friends (1955)
- The Night They Killed Rasputin (1960)
- David and Goliath (1960)
- Goliath and the Dragon (1960)
- Terror of the Red Mask (1960)
- The Giant of Metropolis (1961)
- Revenge of the Conquered (1961)
- Sword in the Shadows (1961)
- Between Shanghai and St. Pauli (1962)
- I diavoli di Spartivento (1963)
- Hercules the Invincible (1964)
- Samson vs. the Giant King (1964)
- Desert Raiders (1964)
- Terror of the Steppes (1964)
- Buffalo Bill, Hero of the Far West (1964)
- Adventures of the Bengal Lancers (1964)
- Devil of the Desert Against the Son of Hercules (1964)
- Mutiny at Fort Sharpe (1966)
- Buckaroo: The Winchester Does Not Forgive (1968)
- Vengeance Is My Forgiveness (1968)
