= The Thrill of the Skies =

- Directed by: Giorgio Ferroni
- Written by: Gian Paolo Callegari; Remigio Del Grosso; Domenico Paolella; Raoul Quattrocchi; Giorgio Ferroni
- Produced by: Sandro Pallavicini
- Starring: Silvana Jachino; Mario Giannini; Mario Ferrari; Aldo Fiorelli
- Cinematography: Vincenzo Seratrice
- Edited by: Giorgio Simonelli
- Music by: Amedeo Escobar
- Production company: INCOM
- Distributed by: Cine Tirrenia
- Release date: 8 March 1940
- Running time: 98 minutes
- Country: Italy
- Language: Italian

The Thrill of the Skies (Italian: L'ebbrezza del cielo) is a 1940 Italian war film directed by Giorgio Ferroni and starring Silvana Jachino, Mario Giannini and Mario Ferrari. A group of aspiring young pilots in the city of Asiago construct a glider. After service in the Spanish Civil War, they return to a heroic reception in their home city.

Much of the film was shot on location around Asiago. Although mostly filmed in black-and-white, the last few minutes are in Dufaycolor. Ferroni had recently returned from Spain, where he had directed pro-Nationalist documentaries.

== Cast ==
- Silvana Jachino as Maria
- Mario Giannini as Vittorio
- Mario Ferrari as L'aviatore
- Aldo Fiorelli as Franco
- Fausto Guerzoni as Fausto
- Franco Brambilla as Il ragazzo
- Adelmo Cocco as Il sacerdote

== Bibliography ==
- Brunetta, Gian Piero. The History of Italian Cinema: A Guide to Italian Film from Its Origins to the Twenty-first Century. Princeton University Press, 2009.
- Raimondo-Souto, H. Mario. Motion Picture Photography: A History, 1891-1960. McFarland, 2006.
