= Carlo Salsa =

Italian journalist, writer and military officer

Carlo Salsa (Alessandria, 1893 – Milan, 4 March 1962) was a Military Officer, Italian journalist, writer and screenwriter.

== Selected filmography ==
- The King's Jester (1941)
