= Tatiana Farnese =

Italian actress (1924–2022)

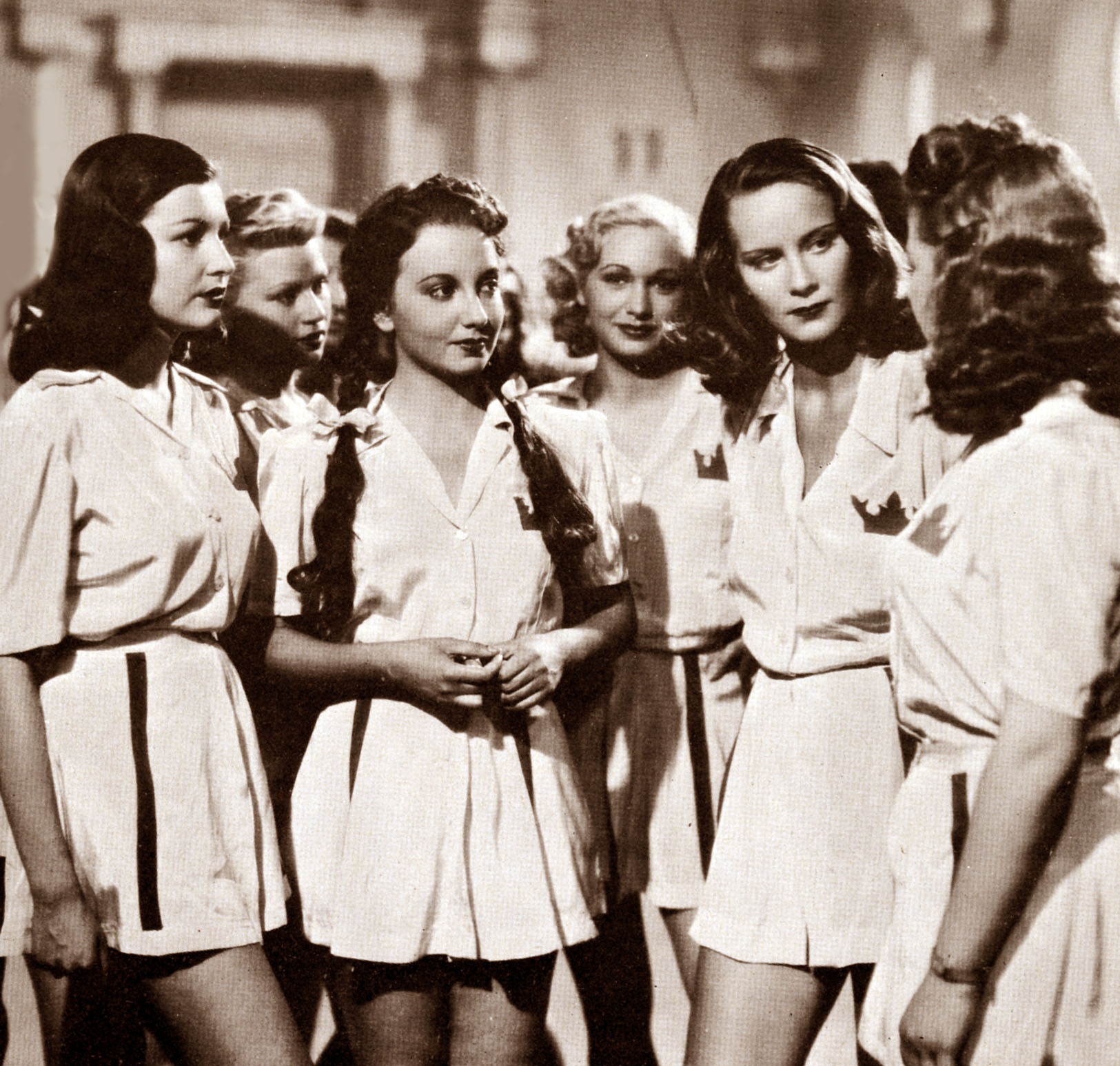
- Farnese (left) in Schoolgirl Diary
- Born: Tatiana Idonea; 19 April 1924; Rome, Italy
- Died: 31 January 2022 (aged 97); Rome, Italy
- Occupation: Actress

Tatiana Idonea (19 April 1924 – 31 January 2022), better known by the stage name of Tatiana Farnese, was an Italian actress. She died in Rome on 31 January 2022, at the age of 97.

== Filmography ==
- Schoolgirl Diary (1941)
- A Garibaldian in the Convent (1942)
- The Gorgon (1942)
- The Woman of Sin (1942)
- Two Suffer Better Than One (1943)
- The Mad Marechiaro (1952)
- Suffocating Heat (1991)
- Nestor - Last Ride (1994)
- Your Whole Life Ahead of You (2008)
- Three Days Later (2013)
