= What Scoundrels Men Are! (1932 film) =

1932 film

- 4 screenshots from film
- Directed by: Mario Camerini
- Written by: Mario Camerini; Aldo De Benedetti; Mario Soldati
- Starring: Vittorio De Sica; Lia Franca
- Cinematography: Domenico Scala; Massimo Terzano
- Edited by: Fernando Tropea
- Music by: Cesare A. Bixio
- Distributed by: Cines
- Release date: August 1932
- Running time: 67 minutes
- Country: Italy
- Language: Italian

What Scoundrels Men Are! (Italian: Gli uomini, che mascalzoni!) It is a 1932 Italian "white-telephones" comedy film directed by Mario Camerini.

The film was a great success, De Sica and Lia Franca became stars, and the song Parlami d'amore Mariù was a hit. Rare in Italian film history, it was filmed on real Milan locations; nowadays, it is a sort of documentary on what Milan was like in the 1930s. It was produced by Cines, with film sets designed by the art director Gastone Medin. The film was remade in 1953 by Glauco Pellegrini.

== Cast ==
- Lia Franca as Mariuccia
- Vittorio De Sica as Bruno
- Cesare Zoppetti as Tadino
- Aldo Moschino as Count Piazzi
- Carola Lotti as Gina
- Anna D'Adria as Letizia
- Gemma Schirato as Widow
- Maria Montesano as Candies woman
- Tino Erler as Mario Castelli
- María Denis
- Didaco Chellini as The engineer
