= Sergio Fantoni =

Italian actor (1930–2020)

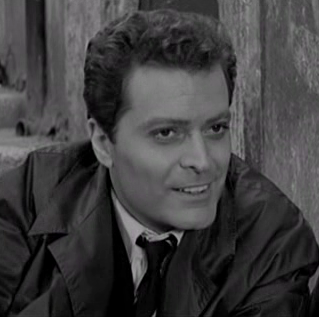
- Fantoni in Silver Spoon Set (1960)
- Born: 7 August 1930; Rome, Italy
- Died: 17 April 2020 (aged 89); Milan, Italy
- Occupations: Actor; voice actor; director; playwright
- Years active: 1948–2003
- Spouse: Valentina Fortunato (m. 1961; died 2019)
- Children: 1
- Father: Cesare Fantoni

Sergio Fantoni (7 August 1930 – 17 April 2020) was an Italian actor, voice actor, playwright and director.

== Biography ==
Fantoni was born in Rome to the actor Cesare Fantoni. He began his career appearing in films, radio dramas, television and theatrical productions in the late 1940s. He made his debut film appearance alongside his father in the 1949 film Anthony of Padua.

In addition to working mainly in his own country, he starred in international productions as well. Fantoni made several appearances in Hollywood films in the 1960s, most notably in The Prize and Von Ryan's Express. In 1960, he played the villainous Haman in Esther and the King, starring Joan Collins and Richard Egan in the title roles. Among his roles in the UK, Fantoni appeared alongside Anglo-Italian actress Cherie Lunghi in the Channel 4 television series The Manageress.

Fantoni was also a voice actor. He most notably dubbed over Marlon Brando’s voice in Apocalypse Now. He also provided voice-overs for Henry Fonda, Rock Hudson, Gregory Peck, Ben Kingsley, Max von Sydow and Robert Taylor in at least one or two of their movies.

=== Personal life ===
Fantoni was married to actress Valentina Fortunato (whom he met at the Piccolo Teatro in Milan in 1954) from 1961 until her death in 2019. They had one daughter, Monica.

In 1997, Fantoni underwent a laryngectomy, which caused problems for his voice. Because of this, he devoted himself mainly to directing until his retirement in 2003.

Fantoni died on 17 April 2020, at the age of 89.

== Selected filmography ==
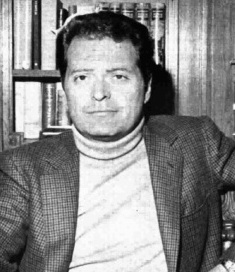
Fantoni in 1975

- Anthony of Padua (1949) – Un cavaliere
- Paolo e Francesca (1950)
- The Lion of Amalfi (1950) – Ruggero
- The Wonderful Adventures of Guerrin Meschino (1952)
- Captain Phantom (1953) – Officer in second
- Senso (1954) – Luca
- The Prince with the Red Mask (1955)
- Io sono la primula rossa (1955) – Lord Sheridan
- ...And the Wild Wild Women (1959) – Giudice instruttore (uncredited)
- Hercules Unchained (1959) – Eteocles
- Caterina Sforza, la leonessa di Romagna (1959) – Giacomo Feo
- La notte del grande assalto (1959) – Marco da Volterra
- The Giant of Marathon (1959) – Teocrito
- The Employee (1960) – Sergio
- Escape by Night (1960) – Don Valerio
- Atom Age Vampire (1960) – Pierre Mornet
- I Delfini (1960) – Doctor Mario Corsi
- Esther and the King (1960) – Haman
- Il peccato degli anni verdi (1960) – Giulia's husband
- Blood Feud (1961)
- Gioventù di notte (1961) – Commissario
- Man nennt es Amore (1961) – Fabrizio
- Pigeon Shoot (1961) – Nardi
- Morte di un bandito (1961) – Michele Galardo
- The Shortest Day (1962) – (uncredited)
- Ten Italians for One German (1962) – Gilberto di San Severino
- Catherine of Russia (1963) – Orloff
- Kali Yug: Goddess of Vengeance (1963) – Ram Chand
- The Mystery of the Indian Temple (1963) – Ram Chand
- The Prize (1963) – Dr. Carlo Farelli
- High Infidelity (1964) – Luigi (segment "La Sospinosa")
- Corpse for the Lady (1964) – Commisario
- Von Ryan's Express (1965) – Capt. Oriani
- Do Not Disturb (1965) – Paul
- What Did You Do in the War, Daddy? (1966) – Capt. Fausto Oppo
- Diabolically Yours (1967) – Freddie
- Hornets' Nest (1970) – Capt. Friedrich Von Hecht
- Sacco & Vanzetti (1971) – Consul Giuseppe Andrower (uncredited)
- Bad Man's River (1971) – Colonel Enrique Fierro
- The Bloody Hands of the Law (1973) – Musante
- Una chica y un señor (1974) – El Señor
- Le Hasard et la Violence (1974) – Inspecteur Tanner
- E cominciò il viaggio nella vertigine (1974) – Andrei
- L'inconveniente (1976)
- Si elle dit oui... je ne dis pas non (1983) – Carniato
- The Belly of an Architect (1987) – Io Speckler
- Private Affairs (1988)
- Per non dimenticare (1992)
- The Accidental Detective (2003) – Baroni (final film role)

== Dubbing roles ==
=== Live action ===
- Walter E. Kurtz in Apocalypse Now
- Jordan "Bick" Benedict Jr. in Giant
- U.S. President in Meteor
- Mahatma Gandhi in Gandhi
- Dr. Danielsson in Hurricane
- Charles Keith in Marooned
- Sheriff Henry Tawes in I Walk the Line
- Jake Wade in The Law and Jake Wade
- John Nordley in The House of the Seven Hawks
- Thomas Farrell in Party Girl
- Alwin Kramer in Tora! Tora! Tora!
- Max Bercovicz in Once Upon a Time in America
- James A. Garfield in The Price of Power
- Prince Paul Chegodieff in Rasputin and the Empress
- Caldicott in The Lady Vanishes
- Prince Paul von Haraldberg in Anastasia
- Prince Escalus of Verona in Romeo and Juliet
- Sir in The Dresser
- André Delambre in The Fly
- Dr. John Constable in St. Ives
- Robert Hearn in The Naked and the Dead
- Edoardo in Il bell'Antonio
- Peter Van Hoek in The Badlanders
- Rodrigo Sanchez in The Naked Maja
- Guy Haines in Strangers on a Train
- Galeazzo Ciano in The Verona Trial
- Mr. Miggs in Bonnie Scotland (1957 redub)
- Lope de Aguirre in Aguirre, the Wrath of God
- Lee in The Magnificent Seven
- Karl Stegner in Firepower
