= Annibale Betrone =

Italian actor (1883–1950)

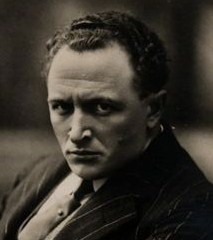
- Born: 9 December 1883; Turin, Piedmont, Kingdom of Italy
- Died: 11 December 1950 (aged 67); Rome, Lazio, Italy
- Occupation: Actor
- Years active: 1916–1950 (film)

Annibale Betrone (9 December 1883 – 11 December 1950) was an Italian stage and film actor, and film, theatre and radio director.

== Selected filmography ==
- Black Shirt (1933)
- Villafranca (1934)
- Teresa Venerdì (1941)
- Piccolo mondo antico (1941)
- Fedora (1942)
- Torrents of Spring (1942)
- The Countess of Castiglione (1942)
- The Princess of Dreams (1942)
- Captain Tempest (1942)
- The Little Teacher (1942)
- The Lion of Damascus (1942)
- Fourth Page (1942)
- Giarabub (1942)
- The Gorgon (1942)
- The Gates of Heaven (1945)
- No Turning Back (1945)
- Pact with the Devil (1950)
- Torment (1950)

== Bibliography ==
- Goble, Alan. The Complete Index to Literary Sources in Film. Walter de Gruyter, 1999.
