= Girl of the Golden West (1942 film) =

- Directed by: Carl Koch
- Written by: Pierre Benoit (novel); Lotte Reiniger; Carl Koch
- Based on: La Dame de l'Ouest; 1936 novel by Pierre Benoit
- Produced by: Franco Magli
- Starring: Michel Simon; Isa Pola; Rossano Brazzi; Valentina Cortese
- Cinematography: Ubaldo Arata
- Edited by: Eraldo Da Roma
- Music by: Mario Nascimbene
- Production company: Scalera Film
- Distributed by: Scalera Film
- Release date: 9 February 1942
- Running time: 85 minutes
- Country: Italy
- Language: Italian

Girl of the Golden West (Italian: Una signora dell'ovest) is a 1942 Italian western film directed by Carl Koch and starring Michel Simon, Isa Pola and Rossano Brazzi. It is based on the 1936 novel, La Dame de l'Ouest, by Pierre Benoit. It was made at the Scalera Studios in Rome, and on location in Lazio countryside. The film's title alludes to the opera The Girl of the Golden West by Giacomo Puccini, but is not an adaptation. It was one of only a handful of Westerns to be made during the silent and Fascist eras, in a genre for which Italy later became famous.

== Synopsis ==
Arianna, an Italian actress, joins a caravan heading into the American West with her companion Diego. Diego is eventually killed by a local villain. Arianna falls in love with the villain without realising that he is the murderer.

== Cast ==
- Michel Simon as Butler
- Isa Pola as Arianna
- Rossano Brazzi as William
- Valentina Cortese as Madge
- Renzo Merusi as Diego
- Carlo Duse as un dipendente di Butler
- Vittorio Duse
- Cesare Fantoni
- Oreste Fares
- Nicola Maldacea
- Augusto Marcacci
- Amina Pirani Maggi
- Corrado Racca

== Bibliography ==
- Bondanella, Peter; Pacchioni, Federico (2017), A history of Italian cinema, ISBN 9781501307645, OCLC 1240187787, 984512006
