= Giacomo Moschini =

Italian actor

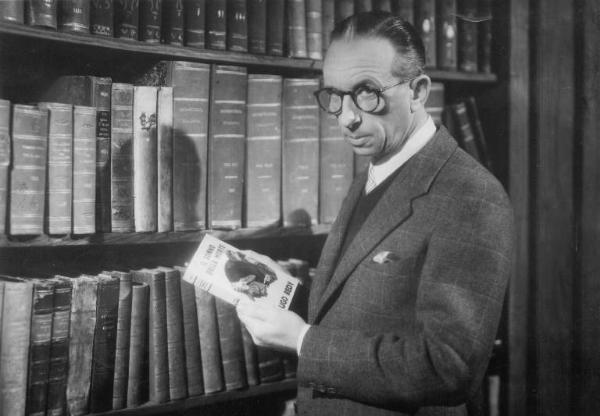
- Giacomo Moschini
- Born: 16 April 1896; Padua, Veneto, Italy
- Died: 13 November 1943 (aged 47); Rome, Lazio, Italy
- Occupation: Actor
- Years active: 1928-1943 (film)

Giacomo Moschini (1896–1943) was an Italian film actor.

== Filmography ==
Year	Title	Role	Notes
1928	Brigata Firenze		
1929	La locandiera		
1929	Maratona		
1929	Rails	Un amico di Jacques al casinò	
1930	Giardini che vivono		
1931	The Charmer		
1931	Resurrection	Un gentleman del tabarin	
1932	Paradise		
1933	Non sono gelosa	Mr. Etta	
1933	I'll Always Love You	L'inquilino del piano di sotto	
1936	Tredici uomini e un cannone		
1939	Fascino		
1939	Unjustified Absence	Il professore 'buono'	
1939	The Document	Il conte Sabelli	
1939	Un mare di guai	Il senatore	
1940	Tutto per la donna		
1940	Il Ponte dei sospiri	Il doge Lando Grado	
1940	La granduchessa si diverte	Il primo ministro	
1940	La donna perduta	Invitato al Festa del Barone	
1940	La danza dei milioni	Il barone Fabri	
1940	L'arcidiavolo		
1940	Cantate con me	Marcello	
1940	La fanciulla di Portici	Fra' Savino	
1941	Orizzonte dipinto	Monaldo	
1941	I mariti (Tempesta d'anime)	Il marchese Teodoro	
1941	The Hero of Venice	Il doge	Uncredited
1941	Thrill	Un ispettore di polizia	
1941	The King's Jester	Signor De Pardaillan	
1941	Honeymoon	Bosio	
1941	The Betrothed	Il dottor Azzeccagarbugli	
1942	Le vie del cuore	Un amico di Giorgio alla festa	
1942	La signorina		
1942	Rossini	Il duca Carafa	Uncredited
1942	La maestrina	Un impiegato comunale	
1942	The Countess of Castiglione	Mocquart	
1942	Malombra	Giorgio Mirovitch, il notaio	
1942	Quarta pagina		
1943	Back Then	Fernandez, Marktbudenbesitzer	
1943	Annabella's Adventure		
1943	Short Circuit	Il commissario Plunk	
1943	L'amico delle donne	De Targettes	
1943	Il viaggio del signor Perrichon		
1943	Non sono superstizioso... ma!		
1943	Canal grande	Il conte Vendramin	
1943	La maschera e il volto	Il maggiordomo del conte	
1944	L'uomo del romanzo	Marcello	
1944	Piruetas juveniles	Raul	(final film role)

== Bibliography ==
- Verdone, Luca. I film di Alessandro Blasetti. Gremese Editore, 1989.
