= Libera (surname) =

Libera is a surname of Latin origin.

Notable people with the surname include:

- Adalberto Libera, Italian architect
- Antoni Libera, Polish writer and director
- Beata Małecka-Libera, Polish politician
- Elena Libera, Italian fencer
- Giacomo Libera, Italian footballer
- Luca Dalla Libera, Italian canoeist
- Piotr Libera, Polish bishop
- Zbigniew Libera, Polish artist

== See also ==
- Libera (disambiguation)
