= Aldo Fiorelli =

Italian actor (1915–1983)

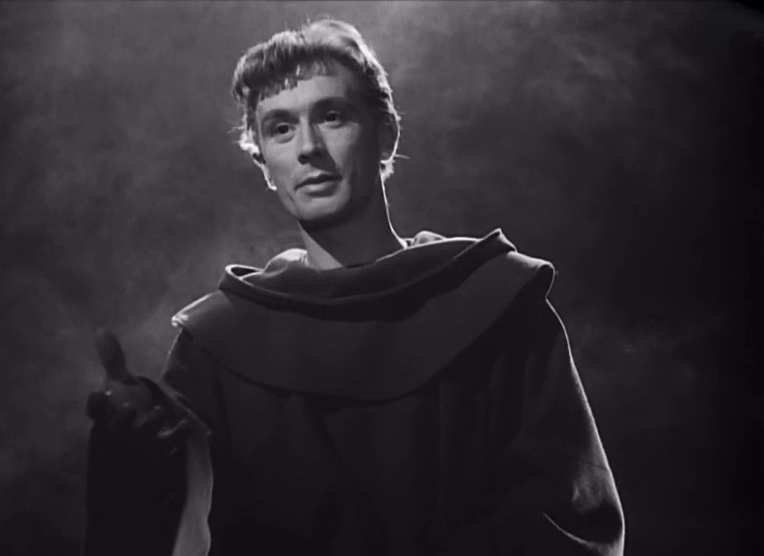
- Fiorelli in Anthony of Padua (1949)
- Born: 8 May 1915; Calenzano; Italy
- Died: 1983 (aged 67–68)
- Occupation: Actor
- Years active: 1938–1960 (film)

Aldo Fiorelli (8 May 1915 – 1983) was an Italian actor who appeared in around thirty films between 1938 and 1960. One of his final roles was Argos, the eponymous shipbuilder of the ship Argo in the 1958 film Hercules and its 1959 sequel Hercules Unchained.

== Filmography ==
Year	Title	Role	Notes
1938	Il conte di Brechard		
1938	Jeanne Doré		
1939	The Faceless Voice	Un tecnico addetto alla moviola	
1939	Heartbeat	Un allievo del professore Comte	
1939	Trial and Death of Socrates	Fedone	
1940	The Thrill of the Skies	Franco	
1940	The Siege of the Alcazar	Francisco	
1940	Goodbye Youth	Ernesto	
1940	Manovre d'amore		
1941	L'orizzonte dipinto	Massimo	
1941	Honeymoon	Mario	
1942	Oro nero		
1942	Margherita fra i tre	Paolo Nardelli	
1943	L'usuraio	Stefano Varni, suo figlio	
1943	Incontri di notte	Paolo Rossi	
1944	Tre ragazze cercano marito	Stefano	
1945	Vivere ancora		
1947	Christmas at Camp 119	Guido, il fiorentino	
1949	Anthony of Padua	Fernando – poi Antonio di Padova	
1949	Napoli eterna canzone		Uncredited
1949	La figlia del peccato	Ernesto	
1950	Hearts at Sea	Tenente Gabrielli	
1952	The Wonderful Adventures of Guerrin Meschino	Alessandro	
1952	Drama on the Tiber	Aldo Rossi	
1953	The Pagans	Renzo Da Ceri	
1953	Anna perdonami	Paolo	
1954	Cardinal Lambertini	Abbot Cavalcanti	
1955	Tua per la vita	Silvestri	
1958	Hercules	Argos the Shipbuilder	
1959	Hercules Unchained	Argos the Shipbuilder	
1960	The Warrior Empress	Scarface	(final film role)

== Bibliography ==
- Hughes, Howard. Cinema Italiano: The Complete Guide from Classics to Cult. I.B.Tauris, 2011.
