= Libero (web portal) =

Italian web portal (established 1994)

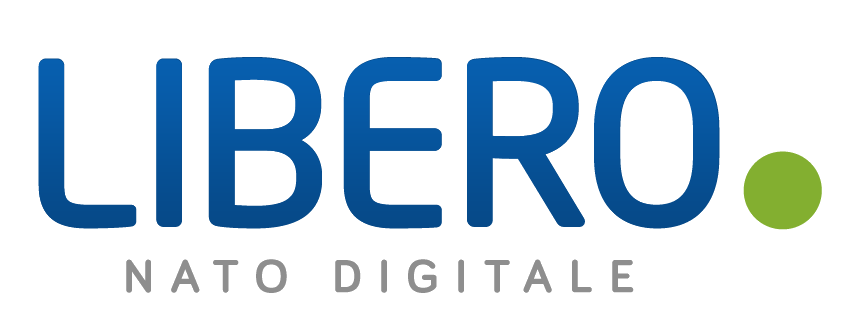
- Former name: InWind
- Website type: Web portal
- Available in: Italian
- Founded: 1994; 32 years ago
- Country of origin: Italy
- Area served: Italy
- Owner: Italiaonline
- Founder: Infostrada
- Website: www.libero.it
- Registration: Optional
- Launched: 3 June 1999; 27 years ago
- Current status: Active

Libero (formerly InWind) is an Italian Web portal owned by Italiaonline and founded by Infostrada in 1994 as a Website to assist users in browsing the Internet, which at the time still had a fee, and in configuring an e-mail. Alongside Virgilio.it, a web portal created in 1996, and the two most widely read newspapers, Corriere della Sera and la Repubblica, Libero is a household name within Italian online news. Alongside Virgilio, Libero was the local-web complementation for large international sites like Google and Facebook among websites attracting the most online traffic in Italy.

In May 2007, Libero was among the top 30 brand of the month in Italy, with over 10.5 million unique visitors, ahead of Yahoo!, Alice, eBay, the Italian Wikipedia, and Microsoft, and behind only Google and MSN/Windows Live. By June 2010, it was listed 8th among the top ten websites generting the most unique users in Italy at over 13 million, behind Google, Facebook, YouTube, MSN/Windows Live/Microsoft Bing, Virgilio, Yahoo!, and Microsoft, and ahead of Wikipedia and Blogger. Libero News was listed 4th among the top 10 news websites at over 5 million uniques visitors, behind la Repubblica, Corriere della Sera, and TGcom, and ahead of La Stampa (La Stampa.it), Quotidiano.net, Virgilio Notizie, Google News, Il Fatto Quotidiano, Lettera43, Il Post, and Linkiesta.

== Logo history ==
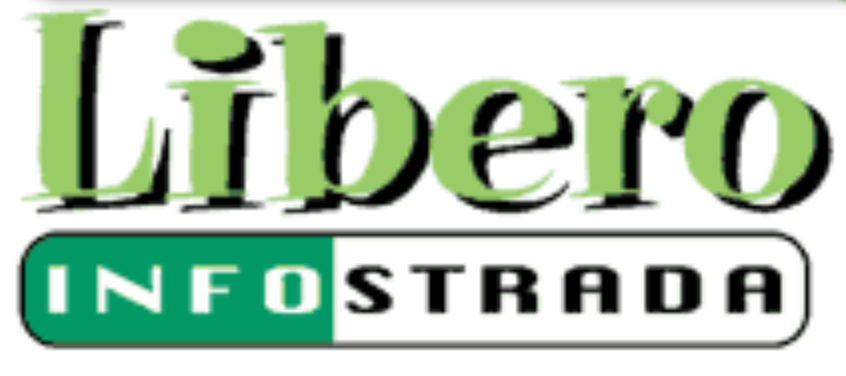
1999-2002

2002-2012

2012-2013

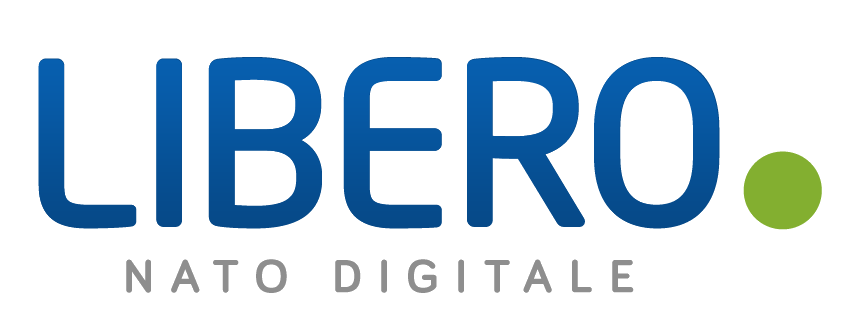
2013–present

== See also ==
- Certified email
- Cloud computing
- Infostrada
