= Diana Dei =

Italian actress (1914–1999)

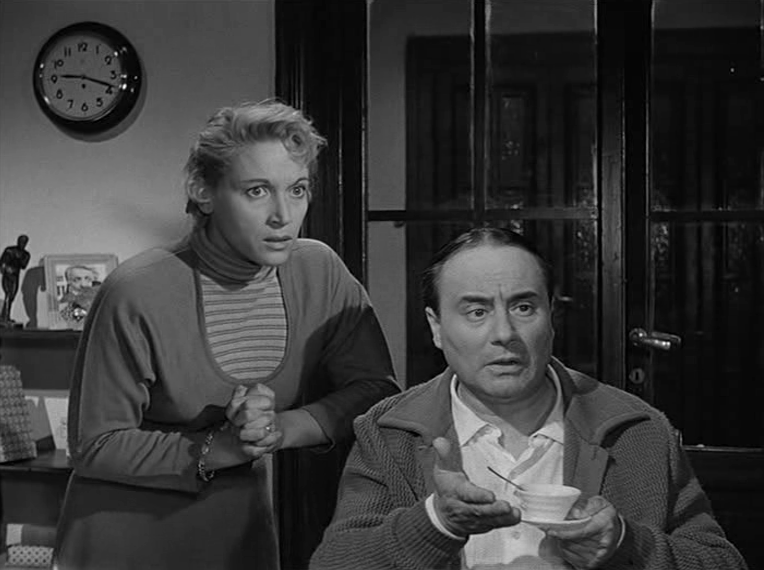
- Diana Dei and Mario Riva in Bravissimo (1955)
- Born: Agnese Mancinelli; 1 March 1914; Rome, Italy
- Died: 3 January 1999 (aged 84); Rome, Italy
- Occupation: Actress
- Years active: 1939-1990

Diana Dei (born Agnese Mancinelli, 1 March 1914 – 3 January 1999) was an Italian film actress. She was married to actor Mario Riva.

== Selected filmography ==
- A Woman Has Fallen (1941)
- Honeymoon (1941)
- Baron Carlo Mazza (1948)
- The Cadets of Gascony (1950)
- Toto the Third Man (1951)
- The Mad Marechiaro (1952)
- The Country of the Campanelli (1954)
- Bravissimo (1955)
- Red and Black (1955)
- Arrivano i dollari! (1957)
- Toto, Peppino and the Fanatics (1958)
- The Good Soldier (1982)

== Bibliography ==
- Ann C. Paietta. Teachers in the Movies: A Filmography of Depictions of Grade School, Preschool and Day Care Educators, 1890s to the Present. McFarland, 2007.
