= Amedeo Escobar =

Italian composer

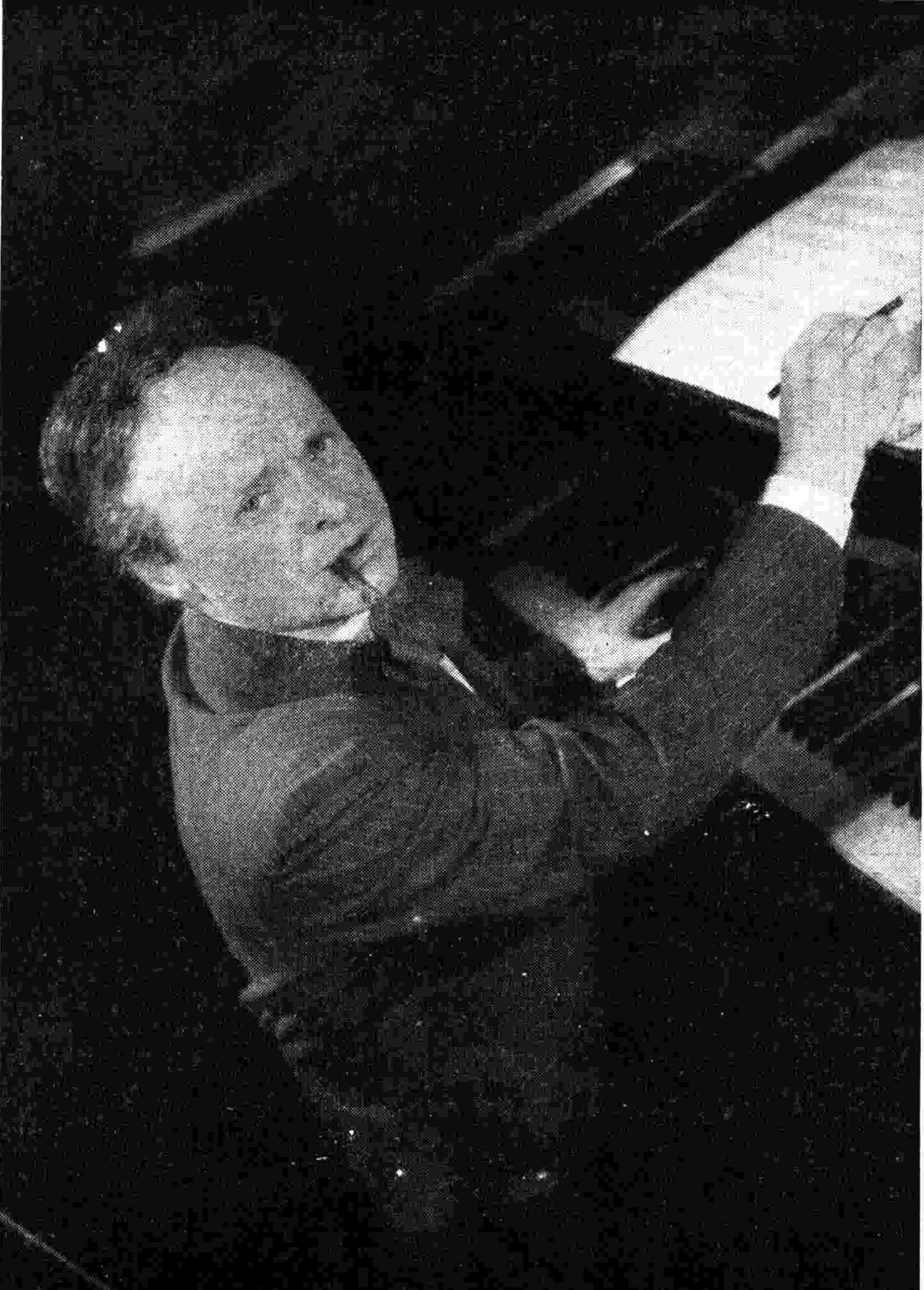
- Born: 14 August 1888; Pergola, Marche, Italy
- Died: 16 November 1973 (aged 85); Viareggio, Tuscany, Italy
- Occupation: Composer
- Years active: 1931–1952 (film)

Amedeo Escobar (1888–1973) was an Italian composer of film scores. He attended the Accademia Nazionale di Santa Cecilia in Rome where he studied harmony, composition and cello under Luigi Forino.

== Selected filmography ==
- Resurrection (1931)
- The Last of the Bergeracs (1934)
- The Countess of Parma (1936)
- I've Lost My Husband! (1937)
- The Thrill of the Skies (1940)
- Captain Tempest (1942)
- The Lion of Damascus (1942)
- Macario Against Zagomar (1944)
- Toto Looks for a House (1949)
- Toto Looks for a Wife (1950)
- Beauties on Bicycles (1951)
- Drama on the Tiber (1952)

== Bibliography ==
- Christopher Frayling. Spaghetti Westerns: Cowboys and Europeans from Karl May to Sergio Leone. I.B.Tauris, 2006.
