= Valentina Fortunato =

Italian actress (1928–2019)

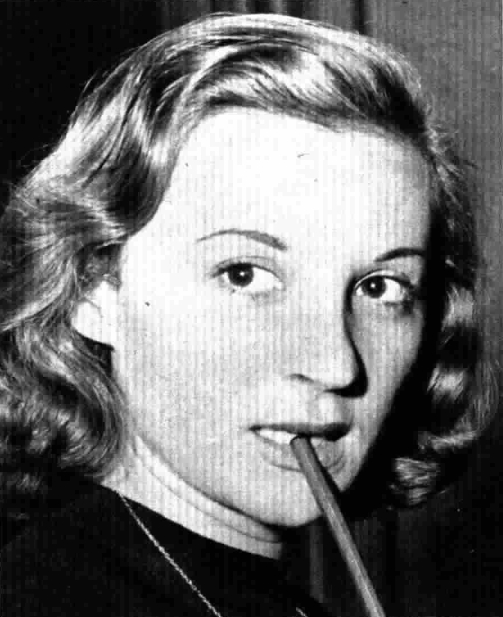
- Fortunato in Radiocorriere magazine (1959)
- Born: 5 August 1928; Milan, Italy
- Died: 21 June 2019 (aged 90); Milan, Italy
- Occupation: Actress
- Spouse: Sergio Fantoni (m. 1961)
- Children: 1

Valentina Fortunato (5 August 1928 - 21 June 2019) was an Italian actress, mainly active on stage.

== Life and career ==
Born in Milan, Fortunato made her stage debut in 1948, in a rendition of William Shakespeare's Twelfth Night directed by Fantasio Piccoli at the Teatro Quirino in Rome. After working several years at the Piccolo Teatro in Genoa, in 1953 she became the main actress ("primattrice") in the stage company of the Piccolo Teatro in Milan. Married with the actor Sergio Fantoni, in the 1960s she formed the innovative stage company "Compagnia degli Associati" with him, Giancarlo Sbragia, Luigi Vannucchi and Ivo Garrani. She worked on stage with prominent directors including Luchino Visconti, Giorgio Strehler, Luca Ronconi, Gabriele Lavia, Orazio Costa, Franco Branciaroli.

Fortunato also had an intense television career in television movies and series. Instead, she turned down any film offer, notably a role in Gillo Pontecorvo's Kapo.

Fortunato died of the consequences of a broken femur on 21 June 2019, at the age of 90.
