= 7th Venice International Film Festival =

Italian film festival in 1939

- Location: Venice, Italy
- Founded: 1932
- Festival date: 8 August – 1 September 1939
- Website: Website

Venice Film Festival chronology
- 8th 6th

The "7th" annual (void) Venice International Film Festival was held from 8 August to 1 September 1939. This edition has been strongly influenced by the Fascist regime and was deserted by the United States of America. The Mussolini Cup was won by the historical film Cardinal Messias, while the other main prizes were not awarded.

== Jury ==
- Giuseppe Volpi di Misurata - Jury President
- Olaf Andersson
- Luigi Bonelli
- Ottavio Croze
- Giacomo Paulucci de'Calboli
- Antonio de Obregón
- Dino Falconi
- F.T. Geldenhuys
- Neville Kearney
- Ernest Leichtenstern
- Antonio Maraini
- Ugo Ojetti
- Vezio Orazi
- Junzo Sato
- D.I. Suchianu
- Zdenk Urban
- Louis Villani
- Carl Vincent

== In Competition ==
| English title | Original title | Director(s) | Production country |
|---|---|---|---|
| —N/a | Margarita, Armando y su padre | Francisco Múgica | Argentina |
| Divorce in Montevideo | Divorcio en Montevideo | Manuel Romero | Argentina |
| From the Hills to the Valley | De la sierra al valle | Antonio Ber Ciani | Argentina |
| Ambition | Ambición | Adelqui Migliar | Argentina |
| The Outlaw | El matrero | Orestes Caviglia | Argentina |
| —N/a | Congo, terre d'eaux vives (short film) | André Cauvin | Belgium |
| —N/a | L'Agneau Mystique de Van Eyck (short film) | André Cauvin | Belgium |
| Humoreska | | Otakar Vávra | Bohemia |
| Macoun the Tramp | Tulák Macoun | Ladislav Brom | Bohemia |
| —N/a | Sklenice i chléb (short film) | Jaroslav Tuzar | Bohemia |
| Behind the Facade | Derrière la façade | Yves Mirande, Georges Lacombe | France |
| The Human Beast | La Bête humaine | Jean Renoir | France |
| The End of the Day | La Fin du jour | Julien Duvivier | France |
| The Five-Forty | Öt óra 40 | André De Toth | Hungary |

== Awards ==
- Mussolini Cup
  - Best Film - Cardinal Messias (Goffredo Alessandrini)
- Volpi Cup
  - Best Actor - Not awarded.
  - Best Actress - Not awarded.
- Bronze Medal
  - Girls in Distress (Georg Wilhelm Pabst)
