= Anthony of Padua (film) =

1949 film

- Directed by: Pietro Francisci
- Written by: Raul De Sarro; Fiorenzo Fiorentini; Pietro Francisci
- Produced by: Mario Francisci
- Starring: Aldo Fiorelli; Silvana Pampanini; Carlo Giustini; Alberto Pomerani
- Cinematography: Mario Bava
- Music by: Carlo Innocenzi
- Production company: Oro Film
- Distributed by: Oro Film
- Release date: June 1949
- Running time: 81 minutes
- Country: Italy
- Language: Italian

Anthony of Padua (Italian: Antonio di Padova) is a 1949 Italian historical drama film directed by Pietro Francisci and starring Aldo Fiorelli, Silvana Pampanini and Carlo Giustini. The film portrays the life of Anthony of Padua (1195–1231).

== Cast ==
- Aldo Fiorelli as Fernando - poi Antonio di Padova
- Silvana Pampanini as Anita - madre di Fernando
- Carlo Giustini as Padre di Fernando
- Alberto Pomerani as Il piccolo Fernando
- Manoel Roero as Conte Vincenzo
- Luigi Pavese as Don Luigi
- Ugo Sasso as Il contadino
- Lola Braccini as Sua madre
- Nino Pavese as Achille Sartori
- Piero Pastore as Giano
- Mario Ferrari as Il giudice Don Alicante
- Anna Di Lorenzo as Isabella
- Dianora Veiga as La lussuriosa
- Cesare Fantoni as Sultano
- Guido Notari as Avvocato difensore
- Valerio Tordi as Don Alvaro
- Riccardo Mangano as Don Diego
- Carlo Duse as Capitano delle guardie di Ezzelina
- Vittorio Cramer as Avvocato accusatore
- Antonio Crast as Il buffone di Ezzelino
- Nino Capriccioli as Frate Bernardo
- Armando Guarnieri as Il sicario di Ezzelino
- Sergio Fantoni as Un cavaliere
- Paola Dalgas as Moglie del contadino
- Giovanni Onorato as Altro avvocato difensore
- Aldo Fabrizi as Ezzelino Da Romano
- Leopoldo Marchionni
- William Murray
- Raffaele Saitto
- Felice Minotti

== Bibliography ==
- Moliterno, Gino. The A to Z of Italian Cinema. Scarecrow Press, 2009.
