= Aurelio Robotti =

Italian engineer

Aurelio Robotti (1913–1994) was an Air Engineers Corps CO and later professor at the Polytechnic University of Turin, is another of the handful of space pioneers in Italy, particularly in the field of liquid propellants that he started investigating at the end of the 1940s.

== Career ==
While serving in the AE Corps, he began research into rockets and missiles. After leaving ITAF in 1949 he started his own company Te.Co., experimenting with combustion chambers, until he developed a missile program, where missiles bear his own initials, AR. In 1951 he drew plans for a remotely controlled anti-aircraft missile, the AR-1, fuelled by liquid oxygen and ethylic alcohol. He kept studying the performance of nitric acid and aniline as propellants, building a dozen missile models.

On May 9, 1952, his AR-3 was fired from the Pian della Mussa, becoming the first successfully tested Italian-built liquid-fuel missile. AR-3 "flew straight up for hundreds of yards before disappearing behind a hill", as he himself noted somewhat proudly. In 1955 the Italian Air Force Ministry contracted Whitehead-Motofides (FIAT Group) for a supply of AR-15 missiles developed by Robotti. In his many publications he wrote of thermoelectric propulsion, airborne vectors, solar power and underlined the great importance of a Moon Base for the future of astronautics.

== Legacy ==
The asteroid 9796 Robotti was named in his honor. The official naming citation was published by the Minor Planet Center on 31 March 2018 (M.P.C. 109631).

== Bibliography ==
- Franca Giusti, "Aurelio Robotti, omaggio ad un torinese", 2011
- Aurelio Robotti, 1941–1961, venti anni di storia missilistica in Italia, "Missili" Edizioni Italiane, 1962
- Giovanni Caprara, L'Italia nello spazio, Valerio Levi Editore, 1992
- AA.VV., Le attività spaziali italiane dal dopoguerra all'istituzione dell'Agenzia Spaziale Italiana, Agenzia Spaziale Europea
