= Libero (given name) =

Libero is the given name of:

- Libero Ajello (1916–2004), American mycologist
- Libero Andreotti (1875–1933), Italian sculptor, illustrator and ceramics artist
- Líbero Badaró (1798–1830), Italian Brazilian physician, botanist, journalist and politician who was assassinated
- Libero Bertagnolli (1904–1992), American football player
- Libero Bigiaretti (1906–1993), Italian poet
- Libero Bovio (1883–1942), Italian poet
- Libero Casali (born 1939), Sanmarinese sports shooter
- Libero Cecchini (1919–2020), Italian architect
- Libero Ferrario (1901–1930), Italian cyclist
- Libero Grassi (1924–1991), Italian clothing manufacturer murdered by the Mafia
- Libero Liberati (1926–1962), Italian motorcycle racer
- Libero de Luca (1913–1997), Italian lyric tenor
- Libero Marchini (1914–2003), Italian footballer
- Libero Milone, Italian businessman
- Líbero Parri (born 1982), Spanish footballer
- Libero De Rienzo (1977–2021), Italian actor
- Libero Tresoldi (1921–2009), Italian Bishop of Crema
