= The Adventures of Nicholas Nickleby =

- Genre: Historical drama
- Based on: Nicholas Nickleby by Charles Dickens
- Written by: Alessandro De Stefani
- Directed by: Daniele D'Anza
- Starring: Antonio Cifariello; Leonora Ruffo; Elisa Cegani
- Country of origin: Italy
- Original language: Italian
- No. of series: 1
- No. of episodes: 6

Production
- Running time: 60 minutes
- Production company: RAI Radiotelevisione Italiana

Original release
- Network: RAI 1
- Release: 19 April – 31 May 1958

The Adventures of Nicholas Nickleby (Italian: Le avventure di Nicola Nickleby) is an Italian television series which first aired on RAI 1 in 1958. It is based on the novel Nicholas Nickleby by Charles Dickens.

== Main cast ==
- Antonio Cifariello as Nicola Nickleby (6 episodes)
- Leonora Ruffo as Caterina Nickleby (6 episodes)
- Elisa Cegani as Signorina La Creevy 6 episodes)
- Evi Maltagliati as Signora Nickleby (6 episodes)
- Carlo D'Angelo as Newman Noggs (6 episodes)
- Aroldo Tieri as Wackford Squeers (6 episodes)
- Enrico Glori as Arturo Gride (6 episodes)
- Maria Grazia Spina as Maddalena Bray (6 episodes)
- Arnoldo Foà as Rodolfo Nickleby (5 episodes)
- Alberto Lupo as Walter Bray (5 episodes)
