= Televisione Libera =

Proposed Italian television channel

Televisione Libera (Free Television) was an Italian television channel that was scheduled to launch on 6 November 1958 and intended to break RAI's television monopoly. A police operation two weeks ahead of its launch ended its plans.

== History ==
TVL was founded in Milan on 16 May 1957 by Gianvittorio Figari, where it conducted its first test broadcasts on the UHF band, with a few watts of power, atop the skyscraper at Piazza della Repubblica. William Burns of the Radio Corporation of America supplied its equipment, while NBC supplied content that TVL would air dubbed in Italian. The goal was to create a competitor to RAI's single channel. Reportedly, TVL operated using an 800-watt transmitter.

The station was expected to open on 6 November 1958, with a special live show featuring Frank Sinatra for launch night. However, on 24 October, the Ministry of Posts and Telecommunications sequestered TVL's transmitters before the scheduled launch. This led to a legal battle which ended up in the courts on 23 June 1960. After that, on 13 July, the government declared that television was still a monopoly held by the State. Over time, numerous attempts at launching private television stations to challenge the monopoly emerged, but wouldn't become serious until the 1970s. TVL attempted appealing in order to start broadcasting, but failed.
