= Luca Dalla Libera =

Italian slalom canoeist

Medal record

Men's canoe slalom

Representing Italy

World Championships
Bronze medal – third place	1993 Mezzana	C-1 team

Luca Dalla Libera is an Italian slalom canoeist who competed in the 1990s. He won a bronze medal in the C-1 team event at the 1993 ICF Canoe Slalom World Championships in Mezzana.
