= Pietro Francisci =

Italian film director (1906–1977)

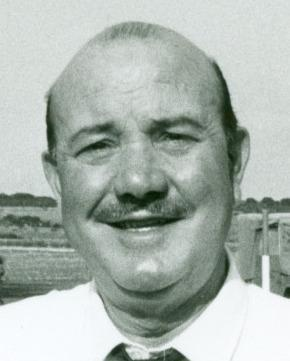
Image of Pietro Francisci

Pietro Francisci (Italian pronunciation: [ˈpjɛːtro franˈtʃiʃʃi]; 9 September 1906 – 1977) was an Italian film director, best remembered for the film Hercules (1958) which inspired the sword and sandal boom of the late 1950s and early 1960s.

Born in Rome, his career took a distinct turn for the worse after he directed the 1966 science-fiction film 2+5 Missione Hydra, released in the U.S. in 1977 as Star Pilot.

== Selected filmography ==
- I Met You in Naples (1946)
- Anthony of Padua (1949)
- Le Meravigliose avventure di Guerrin Meschino (1951)
- Attila (1954)
- Hercules (1958)
- Hercules and the Queen of Lydia (1959) aka Hercules Unchained
- Siege of Syracuse (1960)
- The Warrior Empress (1960)
- Hercules, Samson and Ulysses (1960)
- Star Pilot (1966)
- Sinbad and the Caliph of Baghdad (1973)
