= Cesare Fantoni =

Italian actor

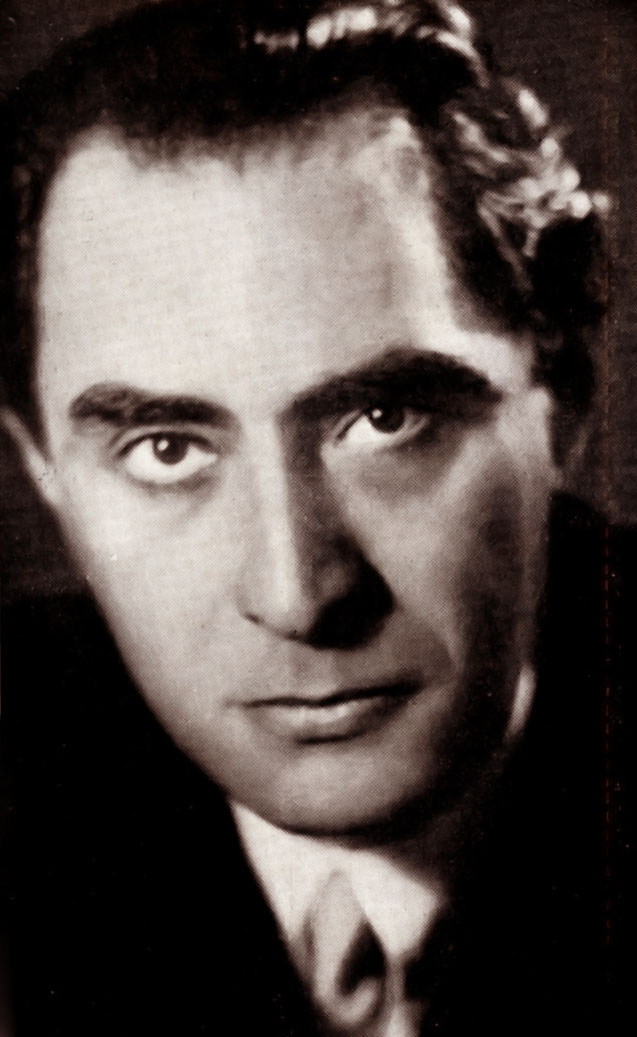
- Fantoni in 1954
- Born: 1 January 1905; Bologna, Italy
- Died: 15 January 1963 (aged 58); Rome, Italy
- Occupations: Actor; voice actor
- Years active: 1939–1962
- Children: Sergio Fantoni

Cesare Fantoni (1 January 1905 – 15 January 1963) was an Italian actor and voice actor.

== Biography ==
Born in Bologna, Fantoni began his acting career in Luchino Visconti’s stage proses until making his first on-screen appearance in 1937. He made his debut film appearance in Doctor Antonio. He then appeared in more than 70 films between 1939 and 1962. Fantoni made light appearances later in his career as Don Ignazio in the films The Overtaxed and Letto a tre piazze.

Fantoni was also a voice actor, dubbing foreign films for release in the Italian market. He dubbed the voices of Leo G. Carroll, Donald Crisp, Frank Faylen, Alan Napier, Thomas Gomez and many more.

Fantoni was the father of actor Sergio Fantoni.

== Selected filmography ==
- Doctor Antonio (1937)
- Guest for One Night (1939)
- Non me lo dire! (1940)
- Then We'll Get a Divorce (1940)
- The Sinner (1940)
- The King's Jester (1941)
- Light in the Darkness (1941)
- The Two Tigers (1941)
- Pirates of Malaya (1941)
- The Hero of Venice (1941)
- Invisible Chains (1942)
- The Gorgon (1942)
- Girl of the Golden West (1942)
- Lively Teresa (1943)
- La Fornarina (1944)
- The Testimony (1946)
- Fatal Symphony (1947)
- Anthony of Padua (1949)
- Red Shirts (1952)
- Drama on the Tiber (1952)
- Sunday Heroes (1952)
- At the Edge of the City (1953)
- Captain Phantom (1953)
- Passionate Song (1953)
- Frine, Courtesan of Orient (1953)
- Love Song (1954)
- Barrier of the Law (1954)
- Pietà per chi cade (1954)
- Tragic Ballad (1954)
- Disowned (1954)
- I Tartassati (1959)
- Attack of the Moors (1959)
- Carthage in Flames (1960)
- Revenge of the Barbarians (1960)
