= Call Me Tonight =

1986 film by Tatsuya Okamoto

- Directed by: Tatsuya Okamoto
- Written by: Tatsuya Okamoto
- Story by: Toshimitsu Suzuki
- Produced by: Toru Miura
- Starring: Sakiko Tamagawa; Katsumi Toriumi; Chie Kōjiro; Rumiko Ukai; Toshihiko Seki
- Cinematography: Yōichi Shimizu
- Edited by: Hajime Okayasu; Toshihiko Kojima; Yumiko Nakaba; Hideaki Murai
- Music by: Norimasa Yamanaka
- Production company: AIC
- Distributed by: Network
- Release date: 28 July 1986 (Japan)
- Running time: 30 minutes
- Country: Japan
- Language: Japanese

Call Me Tonight (Call Me コール・ミー・トゥナイト, Kōru Mī Tunaito) is a 1986 Japanese adult animated horror comedy romance short film directed by Tatsuya Okamoto. It was released on 28 July 1986.

In the film, a young horror fan is possessed by an alien entity. He starts shapeshifting into a monster whenever he feels sexually aroused. An adolescent hotline owner tries to train him in controlling his transformations, in part because she is romantically interested in him. They unwittingly attract the interest of a female member of the yakuza and her sukeban (delinquent) sister. The younger sister kidnaps the man with the intent to rape him, while arranging for the man's love interest to be gang raped by her subordinates.

== Plot ==
A high school girl working by night as a hotline owner, Rumi "Suuko" Natsumi, receives the call for help of a young man, Ryo Sugiura, who claims to transform into a destructive monster every time he masturbates. Amused and attracted by Ryo, a shy yet good-looking pulp horror aficionado, Rumi seduces him during their date in a diner, which proves him right when he transforms right there.

Rumi runs away with him and, upon observing that he turns into a monster whenever sexually aroused, yet is capable to contain it by force of will, decides to try to cure him by habituating him to sexuality. They continue their date into the city's red light district, while following this plan.

Unbeknownst to them, they are being followed by yakuza woman Maki Nohara, who witnessed Ryo's transformation (and is also a pulp horror fan herself). Maki's twisted sukeban sister Oyuki, who happens to be a classmate of Rumi, gets interested in Ryo by a picture, so she tries to blackmail Rumi into bringing Ryo to her. When Rumi refuses and ignores her in favor of another romantic date with Ryo, Oyuki orders her yakuza gang to kidnap them.

Taking the captured couple to an abandoned building, Oyuki leaves Rumi to be ravished by her men while she has her way with Ryo. Meanwhile, mistrustful of Ryo's nature and her sister's intentions, Maki sets out for the place after being warned by her henchman Hayata.

Rumi puts up a fight, but the insecure Ryo is easily raped by Oyuki, which transforms him into a monster greater than ever without possibility to control himself. Arriving there, Maki shoots him with a bazooka, but the monster regenerates and chases them to the building's roof.

Before the creature advances to kill them, a tearful Rumi throws him a keepsake of their date while rebuking him, which makes Ryo snap and control his monstrous body. It is then revealed that Ryo was possessed by an alien entity that collects absorbed lifeforms, which was the cause of his transformations all along. When the entity tries to harm Rumi, Ryo finally gathers the strength to expel it from his body and send it to the night sky above.

Some time later, Maki encounters Rumi and the cured Ryo going out, and it is shown that Oyuki is now reluctantly working in Rumi's company. However, at that moment Maki hears turmoil in their nearby building, which is caused by Oyuki transforming into a monster herself.

== Characters ==
Rumi Natsumi (夏見ルミ, Natsumi Rumi)
Voiced by: Sakiko Tamagawa
Ryō Sugiura (杉浦了, Sugiura Ryō)
Voiced by: Katsumi Toriumi
Oyuki (おユキ, Oyuki)
Voiced by: Chie Kōjiro
Maki (マキ, Maki)
Voiced by: Rumiko Ukai
Hayata (早田, Hayata)
Voiced by: Toshihiko Seki

== Reception ==
On Anime News Network, Justin Sevakis said that "Call Me Tonight" is truly original, and a total product of both manga culture and the 80s."
