= Dagli Appennini alle Ande =

Dagli Appennini alle Ande may refer to:

- Dagli Appennini alle Ande (1959 film), an Italian-Argentine film
- Dagli Appennini alle Ande (1943 film), an Italian drama film
