= Heart (novel) =

Children's novel by Edmondo De Amicis

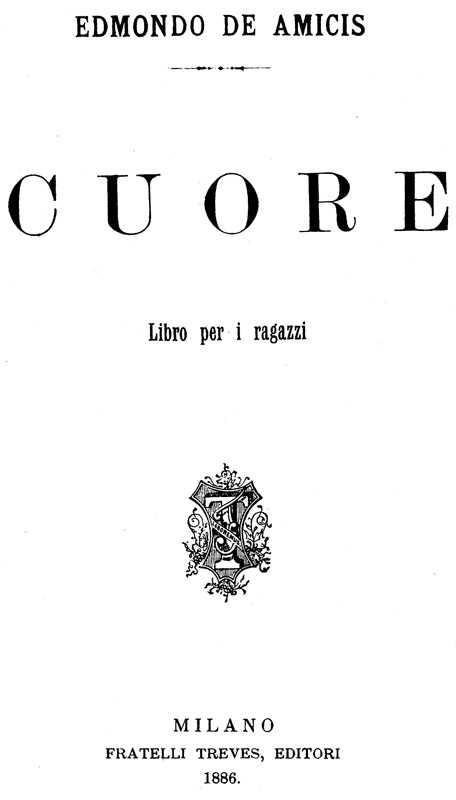
- 1886 first edition title page
- Author: Edmondo De Amicis
- Original title: Cuore
- Language: Italian
- Genre: Children's literature
- Publisher: Fratelli Treves
- Publication date: October 18, 1886
- Publication place: Italy
- Pages: 336
- Text: Heart at Wikisource

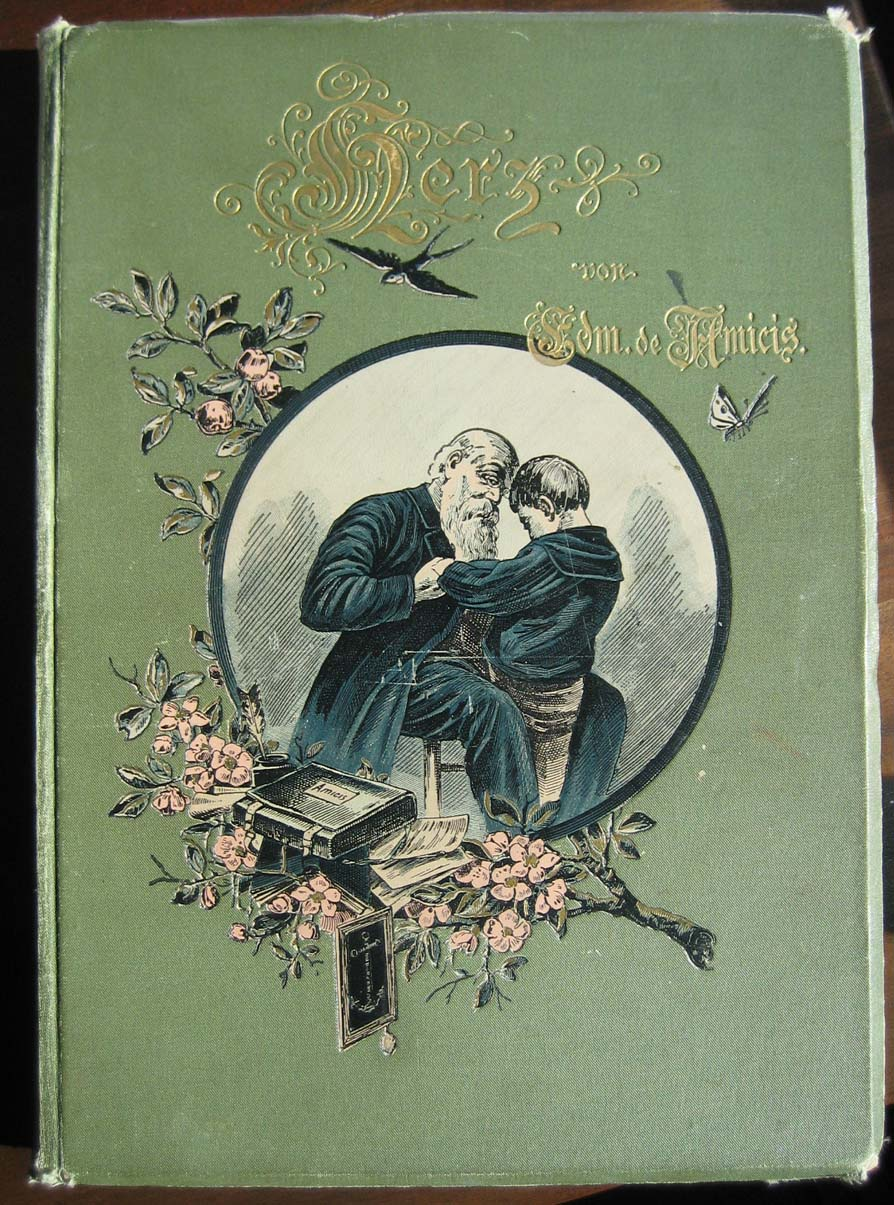
Cover of Herz, an 1894 German translation

Heart (Italian: Cuore [ˈkwɔːre]) is a children's novel by the Italian author Edmondo De Amicis who was a novelist, journalist, short story writer, and poet. The novel is his best known work to this day, having been inspired by his own children Furio and Ugo who had been schoolboys at the time. It is set during the Italian unification, and includes several patriotic themes. It was issued in Milan by Treves on October 18, 1886, the first day of school in Italy, and rose to immediate success. In 1892, Treves published the first illustrated edition, with illustrations by Arnaldo Ferraguti, Enrico Nardi, and Giulio Aristide Sartorio.

Through its investigation of social issues such as poverty, Heart shows the influence of left-wing ideologies on De Amicis' work (he later joined the Italian Socialist Party). Because of this, the book remained influential (and the staple of many textbooks) in countries of the Eastern Bloc. On the other hand, the book's strong evocation of Italian nationalism and patriotism also made it welcome in Fascist Italy.

== Plot ==
The novel is written in a diary form as told by Enrico Bottini, an 11-year-old primary school student in Turin with an upper class background who is surrounded by classmates of working class origin. The entire chronological setting corresponds to the third-grade season of 1881-82 (Enrico says it has been four years since the death of Victor Emmanuel II, king of Italy, and the succession by Umberto I, and also tells about the death of Giuseppe Garibaldi, which happened in 1882).

Enrico's parents and older sister Silvia interact with him as written in his diary, as well as his teacher who assigns him with homework that deals with several different stories of children throughout the Italian states who should be seen as role models – these stories are then given in the book as Enrico comes upon reading them. Every story revolves around a different moral value, the most prominent of which are helping those in need, having great love and respect for family and friends, and patriotism. These are called 'The Monthly Stories' and appear at the end of every school month.

=== Monthly Stories ===
- October: "The Little Patriot of Padua"
- November: "The Little Vidette of Lombardy"
- December: "The Little Florentine Scribe"
- January: "The Sardinian Drummer-Boy"
- February: "Daddy's Nurse"
- March: "Blood of Romagna"
- April: "Civic Valor"
- May: "From the Apennines to the Andes"
- June: "Shipwreck"

== Characters ==
=== Bottini family ===
- Enrico Bottini: Narrator and main character, Enrico is an average student who is keen to learn things and meet people in his classroom.
- Mr. Alberto Bottini: Enrico's father. Stern yet loving, he works as an engineer and businessman.
- Mrs. Bottini: Enrico's mother, she is a traditional homemaker, loving yet tough.
- Silvia Bottini: Enrico's older sister, she also cares for him and his studies, once selflessly foregoing going out with girlfriends to take care of him while he was sick in bed.
- Enrico and Silvia's unnamed younger brother who studies under Ms. Delcati. He does not have much input on Enrico's diary, since he cannot talk down to him like the other family members do.

=== Enrico's classmates ===
- Antonio "Tonino" Rabucco: Known as "the little stonemason" because of his father's job, he is the youngest boy in the class.
- Coretti: The jolly son of a retired veteran turned lumberman. As he often wakes up early in the morning to collect wood, he relies heavily on coffee to stay awake in class. He is always seen wearing his favorite cat-skin cap.
- Ernesto Derossi: The class' perennial champion, he wins the top medal in the class every month. He is a natural learner who doesn't need to study much. Despite his prowess, he is humble and not haughty.
- Garrone: Friendly tough guy, he protects his weak classmates Nelli and Crossi, and as the oldest boy in the class is the de facto enforcer.
- Pietro Precossi: The soft-spoken frail son of an abusive, alcoholic blacksmith who beats him. At one point, he earns the runner-up medal in the class which motivates his father to realise his abusive behavior, sober up and stop beating him.
- Carlo Nobis: Haughty because his parents are rich and of noble lineage, but his father forces him to apologize to Betti when Carlo insults Betti and his coal miner father.
- Stardi: Derossi's perennial medal challenger along with Votini. Although not as mentally gifted as the former, he compensates by being the most determined and hard-working student in class. He likes reading books though he doesn't own many of them.
- Betti: Son of a coal miner.
- Votini: Top contender to the top medal, at one point others make light of his envy of Derossi.
- Crossi: A timid red-head with a paralyzed arm. His father is a woodworker who was absent for most of his childhood, serving time for involuntary manslaughter. He is often a victim of bullies for his disability and family background.
- Nelli: Hunchbacked and also bullied because of it. Garrone becomes his protector.
- Coraci: Dark-skinned boy from Calabria, in Southern Italy.
- Garoffi: Son of a pharmacist, he is a savvy trader who deals on toys, trading cards and useful trinkets on the side whenever he can.
- Franti: Bad student, all-around jerk and delinquent who bullies people, pulls mean pranks, disrespects his classmates and teacher, and laughs at sad situations. He has been expelled from another school before and is expelled from the school after he lights a firecracker that causes a huge explosion.

=== Teachers ===
- Mr. Perboni: The teacher, Perboni is a kindly and affable man who rarely gets angry, but who is stern with his students when they do wrong. He is a lifelong bachelor who considers his students his family.
- Ms. Delcati: Enrico's previous grade teacher, she now teaches his little brother.

== Reception and legacy ==
The novel was translated into Chinese in the early 20th century (with the title "愛的教育" – literally The Education of Love) and became quite well known in East Asia. It was translated into Spanish with the title, Corazón: Diario de un niño meaning Heart: Diary of a Child. The book was popular in Latin countries, such as Mexico, among young boys and girls in the 1960s and 1970s.

The novel was also popular and influential in 1950s Israel, the Hebrew translation going through no less than seventeen printings up to 1963. Its strong evocation of patriotism and its basking in the great recent achievement of Italian Unification were well in tune with the new-born Israel of the 1950s, created in cataclysmic wars and struggles, and the book's Socialist undertones were in tune with the values of Labor Zionism, then dominant in Israel. At present however it is considered rather old-fashioned and no longer well known to the current generation of young Israelis.

In 1887, a sequel, called Testa (Head), was written by neurologist Paolo Mantegazza, Amicis' friend, which narrates the life of Enrico in his teens.

In 1962, Umberto Eco published Elogio di Franti (In Praise of Franti) viewing Franti, the "bad boy" of the novel, as a figure of resistance against militarist and nationalist ideology.

One of the two teenage characters in the film I Prefer the Sound of the Sea (2000) reads Cuore and has a job in a bookshop named Franti.

The book has been used as one of the inspirations for academic achievement in Mexico, having used the name of the author for one of the world schools of the International Baccalaureate called Instituto D'Amicis, located in the city of Puebla.

In 2009, Heart: Diary of a Child was created as an audiobook by Carlos Acosta in English and Spanish languages.

== Adaptations ==
=== Film ===
In 1911, Umberto Paradisi directed the film Il tamburino sardo, adapted from the monthly story "The Sardinian Drummer-Boy". Between 1915 and 1916, all nine monthly stories were adapted into the serial film Cuore, directed by Vittorio Rossi Pianelli, Leopoldo Carlucci, and again by Umberto Paradisi.

In 1948, it was made into a film, directed by Vittorio De Sica and Duilio Coletti.

The fourth episode of Alessandro Blasetti’s 1952 film In Olden Days is based on the story "The Sardinian Drummer-Boy".

Romano Scavolini’s 1973 film Cuore adapts four of the nine monthly stories, setting them in different historical periods ("The Little Vidette of Lombardy", "The Sardinian Drummer-Boy", "Daddy's Nurse", "Blood of Romagna").

=== Adaptations of From the Apennines to the Andes ===
One of the stories, "From the Apennines to the Andes", became particularly popular and went on to become the most frequently adapted of all, both for film and television.

In 1943, it was adapted in the film Dagli Appennini alle Ande directed by Flavio Calzavara.

In 1959, a film of the same title based on the same story was directed by Folco Quilici.

In 1976, the story became the basis of the anime series 3000 Leagues in Search of Mother, produced by Nippon Animation. The series consisted of 52 episodes and was broadcast in the World Masterpiece Theatre. The whole series was viewable in many different languages, and became popular all over the world. In conclusion to the series, a compilation film was released in 1980, and a remake in 1999.

In 1989, the story was adapted into an episode of the anime series Funky Fables.

In 1990, it was made into the German–Italian miniseries Marco – Über Meere und Berge.

Between 2011 and 2012, the story was adapted again in the Spanish miniseries Marco, directed by Félix Viscarret.

=== Television ===
The anime series Manga Fairy Tales of the World adapted the work three times: in 1976 with the episode "The Shipwreck", based on the monthly story of the same name; in 1979 with the four-episode arc "Cuore: School of Love", based on the general plot of the novel; and in the same year with the episode "Ciccillo’s Wish", adapted from the story "Daddy’s Nurse".

Cuore itself was later adapted in its entirety by Nippon Animation, as the 26-episode series Ai no Gakko Cuore Monogatari in 1981. This series was also broadcast on Italian TV. School of Love: Story of Heart was popular in Iran for the generation born after the Iranian Revolution. The series name, which was broadcast in Iran several times, was changed to Students of Walt school.

In 1984, a television miniseries based on the novel was produced by RAI and directed by Luigi Comencini. The series also includes adaptations of the following stories: "The Little Florentine Scribe", "The Sardinian Drummer-Boy," "Daddy’s Nurse", "Blood of Romagna", and "From the Apennines to the Andes".

In 2001, Cuore, a miniseries directed by Maurizio Zaccaro, was produced by Mediaset. It also adapted the stories "The Sardinian Drummer-Boy" and "Blood of Romagna".
