= Maryuu Senki =

Japanese OVA series

魔龍戦紀 (Maryū Senki)
- Original video animation
- Directed by: Hiroaki Oogami
- Produced by: Shuji Uchiyama; Takao Asaga
- Written by: Junichi Watanabe; Noboru Aikawa; Hiroaki Oogami
- Music by: Norimasa Yamanaka
- Studio: AIC
- Released: March 5, 1987 – July 25, 1989
- Runtime: 30 minutes
- Episodes: 3
- Manga
- Written by: Hiroaki Oogami
- Illustrated by: Tamotsu Tagakura
- Published by: LEED
- Published: June 16, 1991
- Volumes: 1

Maryuu Senki (Japanese: 魔龍戦紀, Hepburn: Maryū Senki), also known as Evil Dragon War Chronicles, is a Japanese original video animation (OVA) series. Produced by Bandai Visual and animated by AIC, it was released between 1987 and 1989 for three episodes. It was adapted into an unfinished manga series in 1991.

== Plot ==
Back in the era of Empress Himiko, Japan was ruled from the shadows by a secret caste of shamans called Kidō (鬼道). Although they were exterminated by fear of their power, some of them survived through the centuries, hoping to recover their power by summoning the Four Holy Beasts in human bodies. Their last attempt, performed by esotericists in the Mount Koya, was stopped in 1971 by one of their own creations, a monk with the power of Genbu named Gendo.

In 1989, two party girls in Shinjuku, Tokyo, Tomoyo and Hiroko, are attacked by a mysterious cult seeking the incarnation of Suzaku, but Gendo arrives to the city in time to save the latter. Next morning, young artist Kyoichi Hiyu is mysteriously approached by the leader of the cult, Miki Chiyoe, who has learned Hiyu is the incarnation of Byakko. Kyoichi meets with Gendo, his former master, and is informed that the forces of Seiryu are seeking all the four beasts to exploit their power, as well as that Miki is the son of the previous Seiryu incarnation, Toshiro Chiyoe, who was slain by Gendo himself. Under the suspicion that Hiyu's girlfriend Shiho might be the last beast, Suzaku, Kyoichi and Gendo go meet her, but on the road they find a team sent by Miki with the same mission. While Gendo kills enemy commander Sakaki in a duel of grotesque powers, Kyoichi rushes to Shiho's house, only to find Miki already there. A fight ensues in which both Kyoichi and Miki are seemingly killed.

Some time later, while staying in a safe temple, Shiho feels Kyoichi is still alive in Tokyo, having only lost control of his power. Gendo and Shiho search for him, meeting again with Chiyoe forces under the command of new lieutenant Mukuri, but they are saved by a duo of monk fighters, Ryora and Kinshi, sent as reinforcements from allies in the Mount Koya. Those manage to find and subdue the now animalistic Kyoichi, only for an intruding Mukuri to kidnap Shiho and unveil a mutated Tomoyo as one of his soldiers. She wounds Gendo and fights off Ryora and Kinshi, but Kyoichi finally comes to senses and saves his allies by brutally defeating her. Tomoyo's severed head informs them with her last words that Miki Chiyoe will perform a grand ritual in Shinjuku in order to hijack Shiho's power, so they resolve to crash it.

On the way to Shinjuku, the heroes are attacked by zombified citizens sent by Chiyoe. Meanwhile, Miki, who has now an androgynous body as a consequence of his battle with Kyoichi, seduces Shiho and taunts Kyoichi with images of their intercourse. Gendo fights an inequal battle with a mutant Mukuri while Kyoichi and the monk duo assault the Shinjuku temple, where more mutants and creatures attack them. Tamaki, a female servant of Miki, captures Kinshu and forces Ryora to stay behind to destroy her, after which Kyoichi and Gendo find Chiyoe, who has stolen Shiho's soul. Kyoichi is defeated by Miki, who then reveals Gendo actually died in battle against Toshiro and was a reanimated pawn of the Chiyoe family all the time. Seeing Gendo dead, Kyoichi continues battling hopelessly against Miki, but this time Shiho's soul intervenes to turn against Chiyoe. The temple is destroyed and all of them die, with Kyoichi hoping that he and Shihu will be together in their next life.

== Characters ==
Kyōichi Hiyū (比勇 恭一)
Voiced by: Tessho Genda
A young artist who also practices martial arts. He is the incarnation of Byakko.
Gendō (玄道)
Voiced by: Chikao Ohtsuka
Kyoichi's mentor, an old Esoteric Buddhist monk with martial arts abilities a drinking problem. He is the incarnation of Genbu.
Shiho Murase (村瀬 詩穂)
Voiced by: Sakiko Tamagawa
Kyoichi's highschool-aged girlfriend. She is the incarnation of Suzaku.
Miki Chiyoe (千代妓 美鬼)
Voiced by: Shuichi Ikeda
A sinister businessman bent on acquiring the power of the ancient shamans. He is the incarnation of Seiryu.
Ryōra (綾羅)
Voiced by: Ryosuke Kaizu
A Buddhist monk who joins the fight against Chiyoe. He dresses in modern fashion, in contrast to his partner Kinshu.
Kinshū (錦繍)
Voiced by: Toshihiko Seki
A Buddhist monk who joins the fight against Chiyoe.
Sakaki (榊)
Voiced by: Hajime Koseki
An old ninja working for the Chiyoe family. He and Gendo crossed paths for the first time in 1971.
Mukuri (里椋)
Voiced by: Katsuji Mori
A servant of Chiyoe. His true name is Sakaki. After being endowed with Miki's magic, he can turn into a yōjū (幼獣, yōjū; "spawn beast") mutant.
Tamaki (たまき)
Voiced by: Rumiko Ukai
A female priestess who serves Chiyoe, she is turned into a yōjū by him.
