= Ai no Gakko Cuore Monogatari =

Japanese anime television series

- Enrico Bottini and a classmate
- 愛の学校クオレ物語
- Genre: Drama, historical, school
- Based on: Heart by Edmondo de Amicis
- Written by: Ryuzo Nakanishi
- Directed by: Eiji Okabe
- Music by: Katsuhisa Hattori; Yasushi Akutagawa
- Country of origin: Japan
- Original language: Japanese
- No. of episodes: 26

Production
- Executive producer: Koichi Motohashi
- Producer: Shigeo Endo
- Production companies: Mainichi Broadcasting System; Nippon Animation

Original release
- Network: JNN (MBS)
- Release: April 3 – October 2, 1981

Ai no Gakko Cuore Monogatari (Japanese: 愛の学校クオレ物語, romanized: Ai no Gakkō Kuore Monogatari, lit. 'The Story of Cuore, School of Love') is an anime television series, based on the 1886 novel Cuore, Libro per i Ragazzi (Heart: An Italian Schoolboy's Journal) by Edmondo de Amicis. It first aired from April 3 to October 2, 1981.

The series has been broadcast into some countries, and it has been dubbed in French, Italian, Spanish, Catalan, Polish, Arabic, and Persian.

== Story ==
The story takes place in nineteenth century in Turin, Italy. The events in the anime are based on Enrico Bottini's journal. The boys in early adolescence, innocent and susceptible, meet a teacher of virtue. He tells them honorable and heart-warming stories with which the boys feel great empathy. After experiencing hard times and sharing various joys with their friends and family, the boys recognize what is most important of all: to love others.

== Voice cast ==
- Toshiko Fujita as Enrico Bottini
- Katsue Miwa as Nino Bottini
- Hidekatsu Shibata as Alberto Bottini
- Kaoru Kurosu as Silvia Bottini
- Masaru Saito as Adriana Bottini
- Mikio Terashima as Professor Pervoni
- Kazue Komiya as Professor Del Cacci
- Reiko Suzuki as De Rossi Ernesto
- Yuko Maruyama as Garrone
- Yoko Matsuoka as Antonio
- Rumiko Ukai as Robetti
- Kazue Komiya as Coretti
- Yoshiko Ota as Galoffi
- Yoshiko Sugiyama as Vocini

== Episode list ==
| Episode | Title |
|---|---|
| 1 | Commencement Day: Enrico and Mr. Perboni-Enrico's family is back from a 3-month holiday in the Alps region. Enrico is to enter the fourth grade, and he's anxious about attending the class of one Mr. Perboni. But he seems pretty chill and would like to see his students as his family. |
| 2 | Disaster: Heroic Robetti- Robetti has broken his leg while saving a first-grade student from a skittish horse. His broken leg will take weeks or months to heal. Garrone, Derossi, and Enrico have taken upon themselves to support his studies until he fully recovers. |
| 3 | Classmates: Franti, the Juvenile Delinquent- Crossi, son of a vegetable peddling woman, gets bullied by Franti, the leader of the bad apples. It was garrone that helps him; even when Crossi threw an ink pot at Franti, he took the blame. The headroom teacher mr. Perboni later shames Franti and the others for treating Crossi like this, and Crossi gets friends who would defend him. |
| 4 | In the Attic: Enrico's Secret-Enrico misses his homework after helping Robetti all evening. But he doesn't tell the parents that; rather, they learn of this fact from Crossi when he was getting a Charity visit from Enrico's mom. Enrico's parents become very Proud after hearing that. |
| 5 | Boys of Calabria: Transfer Student Gracche-A new kid from the southern town of Calabria has arrived in Turin. Franti & the bad Apple's want to bully him, but Enrico & the others defend him from that. Seeing this, the teacher, Mr. Perboni, tells the story of the boy from Padua, who wouldn't take alms in his helpless moment from people who disrespect his country. With this, he hopes his students will learn the lesson of patriotism for the newly formed country of Italy. |
| 6 | Best friend Garrone: Face-off with Franti. Garrone hasn't been to school for two days. Taking advantage of it, Franti and the others have been bullying the weak and shy Nelli. Even to the point of stealing Nelli's pocket money. Garrone finally steps in and makes Franti back off. Nelli is inspired by this and makes the decision to step up for himself. In the next p.e. class, he does better than Franti in pole climbing and gathers respect. |
| 7 | A Little Chimney Sweep: Nino's New Friend- A little chimney sweeping boy, same old as Nino, has come to do his work while Enrico's parents were out on an errand. Enrico & Nino then help him in his work. Later that night, the boy loses his payment & comes to Enrico's for help. Enrico's dad understands his trouble & makes sure to enroll the boy in Baretti School, where Nino & Enrico attend. |
| 8 | A Principal's Tears: Boy Scouts of Lombardia- After a military procession with Robetti's father passes through the Beretti School, the headroom teacher mr. Perboni decides to tell the story of the orphaned Lombardian boy who helped a troop of Italian soldiers get valuable recon info in exchange for his life. That & the Principal's dead son is why Mr. Perboni emphasises that the children should always support the sacrifice of the troops. |
| 9 | The King and Father & Son Coretti: Tearful Reunion-Coretti is able to prove to the school children that his father, a lumberjack, was a known soldier working under King Umberto 2nd when he came to Turin to visit the injured soldiers. |
| 10 | Antonio the Young Plasterer: Many Faces in Front of Father- Antonio, the bricklayer, is introduced. He is the son of a construction worker & the class clown. Later he gets full marks in a test. He wants to show it to his dad, but sadly his dad had just fallen off the scaffolding & broken his hips. As Antonio thinks about quitting school to support his parents, his father violently objects & makes him promise to always be attentive in his studies. |
| 11 | Garoffi's Gift: Stamp and Church- Garoffi likes accumulating money from selling Stamps. But he doesn't want Franti to take those away, so he just hides them away in church. Later, Garoffi comes to find & accept that the hidden money has been taken by the priest to be used for the orphans. |
| 12 | Betti the Bullied Boy: Parent-teacher day-Betti, the coalmaker's boy doesn't wanna go to School for parent visitation day as he thinks his dad profession would be made fun of. Betti's father hears this & leaves for school. There he demands answer for his disrepute & through, Vottini's father exacts an apology & lesson for the whole class to learn. |
| 13 | 3000 Leagues in Search of Mother (Part 1)-Mr. Perboni talks about Marco & his quest to find his mom 3000 leagues away in Argentina. He arrives in Buenos Aires, but finds out the contact, Merillo, died a few months ago. So he goes to the Mequinez, where his mom is supposed to work. But they had also left a month ago. So with the help of a benefactor, he goes to Boca town. But there also the master seems to be away for more than a month. |
| 14 | 3000 Leagues in Search of Mother (Part 2)- Marco finds help from the kind old man on the ship from Genoa. He crowdfunds his money for a train ride to Cordoba. After reaching Cordoba, he's told that the Mequinez moved to Tucuman, 800 km from here. He is given a wagon ride to go there. He's dropped off near Tucuman & he reaches said city on foot, exhausted. There he's told that the mequinez actually live 30 km from here. With the route told, he finally reaches the mansion & meets his mom. |
| 15 | Precossi the Blacksmith: Small Knife in Friendship - Precossi's father beats him and destroys his homework. Precossi doesn't tell anyone about it. But later, when that same father injures himself in the workplace, it was precossi that decided to work in the place of his father at the smithy. The father is told about this, and they mend their relationship. Precossi and his father then make 3 knives for Enrico, Derossi, and Garrone as a gift for staying by Precossi's side. |
| 16 | Boy Julio's Secret- To make his classmates understand about Precossi's situation, Mr. Perboni decides to tell the story of the Florentine scribe, Julio. The boy decided to secretly help his father in his work of writing addresses. Even though his studies were failing, he kept at it. With this, Mr. Perboni was able to teach the students about Precossis's filial love for his father. |
| 17 | Stardi's Library: The Person Who Hid the Books- Derossi's Edison biography gets lost, and it's found in Stardi's bag by Franti. Later, Stardi shows his home library that he built with his own money, where he already has another copy of the Edison biography. Enrico realized that he had nothing to do with it. Later on, Stardi does arrange to make Franti humiliate in front of others, so he would confess that it was he who hid Derossi's book in Stardi's bag. |
| 18 | Summer Vacation on the Poe River: Franti's Disaster- It's the start of summer vacation. Franti is looking for trouble, and to show fake bravado, he has jumped in the nearby Po River. But as he was almost drowning, Garrone and Derossi saved him and got him to the doctors. |
| 19 | Summer in the Alps: Father's Teacher is my Teacher- Enrico's father gives a flashback to his childhood when he visits his octogenarian teacher at his own village home. |
| 20 | A Summer Night's Incident: Father's Secret-Enrico and the boys figure out the secret that their fathers have been attending night school, with Enrico's father as the teacher. |
| 21 | Don't Give Up! Charine Family Circus- Enrico and the others help a dying circus troupe called charine circus to get the necessary amount of customer traffic. |
| 22 | Only The Cross Knows: Father's Nursing-To give comfort to crossi for not receiving his dad, Mr. Perboni tells a story of a kid taking care of a dying stranger for an extended time, even though he knew he was not his father. |
| 23 | Father's Gift: Mystery of the Ink Stand!-Crossi's father has finally returned and given him an inkstand as a souvenir. Enrico and Derossi find an exact copy of it in Father Fernando's office. Through him, they learn that for the past six years, Crossi's father was actually in prison for defending his colleague against an abusive boss. Enrico and Dereossi then decide to keep this under wraps. |
| 24 | Franti, The Juvenile Delinquent Runs Out of School-Franti has finally upped his game in bullying. After bothering multiple students and running out of the class, he decided to throw stones at the principal's office. The whole teaching body is one in wanting to expel him, but Mr. Perboni wants to give him a chance, so with Enrico, they track down his house. There, it is found that his grandma is the only one who loves with him. Both of his parents are out of the country for work. The money from them isn't enough, so he does all miscreant stuff |
| 25 | The Boy Who Sacrificed Himself: Franti's Tears- Franti has been stealing children's pocket money, including from Nino. Enrico and the others worry that if he doesn't come, then he will eventually become a street thug. Franti does come to school and hears the story of the miscreant boy who was able to defend his grandma but died with regrets of not being the perfect boy. Franti, after this, decides to change his ways. |
| 26 | Picnic: And Goodbye- After a whole class-wide picnic atop an alpine hill overlooking the whole city of Turin and the final exams, enrico tells his classmates that his father has found a new job in Rome, so they'll be moving there. All his friends give him gifts and tearfully bids them goodbye. |

== Music ==
| Title | English title | Performer | Description |
|---|---|---|---|
| Cuore Monogatari | The Story of Cuore | Eri Takeda with Tokyo Broadcasting Children's Choir | Opening theme |
| Shiroi Nikki | White Diary | Eri Takeda with Tokyo Broadcasting Children's Choir | Ending theme |
