= Sakiko Tamagawa =

Japanese actress

- 玉川砂記子
- Born: January 20, 1962 (age 64); Tokyo, Japan
- Other name: Sakiko Ikeda
- Occupations: Actress; voice actress; singer
- Years active: 1971–present
- Agent: Sigma Seven
- Spouse: Shūichi Ikeda

Sakiko Tamagawa (玉川砂記子, Tamagawa Sakiko; born January 20, 1962) is a Japanese actress, voice actress and singer from Tokyo. She is affiliated with Sigma Seven. She voices Rei Kuki in Genji Tsuushin Agedama, Princess Kakyuu in Sailor Moon Sailor Stars, Natsumi Tsujimoto in You're Under Arrest season 1, You're Under Arrest the Movie, You're Under Arrest Fast & Furious Season 2 & You're Under Arrest Full Throttle Season 3, Miyama Soshigaya in Cyber Team in Akihabara, Kazama's mother in Crayon Shin-chan, and Toyama-san in Atashin'chi. Other roles of note include Pirotess in Record of Lodoss War, Cocoa in NG Knight Ramune & 40, Tachikoma in Ghost in the Shell: Stand Alone Complex, Rouge in Starship Girl Yamamoto Yohko, Juiz in Eden of the East, and Jasmine in Cross Ange.

== Filmography ==
=== Anime ===
List of voice performances in anime
Year	Series	Role	Notes	Source
1981	Fuusen no Doratoraou ja:フーセンのドラ太郎	Madonna	Debut role	
1981	Galaxy Cyclone Braiger	Stella Russell		
1982	Lucy of the Southern Rainbow	Clara Poppuru		
1982	Sasuga no Sarutobi ja:さすがの猿飛	Chiaki		
1983	Miyuki	Michiko Yamamoto		
1983	Lady Georgie	Elise		
1983	Plawres Sanshiro	Maki Asano		
1984	Lupin III Part III	Flora Hirst		
1984	Bismark	Yvette		
1985	Greed	Lar Lipp	OAV	
1985–86	Area 88	Ryoko Tsukumo	OVA	
1986	Call Me Tonight	Rumi Natsumi	OVA	
1987	Maryuu Senki	Shiho Murase	OVA	
1987	City Hunter	Denai		
1987	Esper Mami	Natsuko, Koji's mother		
1987	Grimm's Fairy Tale Classics	Snow White		
1987	Battle Royal High School	Ryoko Takayanagi	OVA	
1987	Daimajū Gekitō: Hagane no Oni	Rui	OVA	
1988	F	Junko Komori		
1988	What's Michael?	Shino		
1988	Oishinbo	Umebi Shu 周梅美		
1988	Dragon Century	Harumi		
1988	Armor Hunter Mellowlink	Lulucy Ramon	OVA	
1989	Legend of Heavenly Sphere Shurato	Sati		
1989	Jungle Emperor Leo	Raiya		
1989	Chinpui ja:チンプイ	Jarashi		
1989	Shutendoji	Sonya Costello	OAV	
1990	Kyatto Ninden Teyandee	Okinu		
1990	NG Knight Ramune & 40	Cocoa		
1990	Moomin	Arisa		
1990	Magical Angel Sweet Mint	Nuts, Pepporin		
1990	Record of Lodoss War	Pirotess		
1990	Nineteen 19	Eiko	OVA	
1990–91	The Hakkenden	Hinagiru	OAV	
1990	Carol	Fairy		
1991	Adventures of the Little Mermaid	Ridley		
1991	Jankenman	Jankenman mother, Jankenman's grandmother		
1991	Sukoshi Fushigi ja:藤子・F・不二雄のSF短編	Midori Fukami	OVA ep. 4	
1991	Akai Hayate	Shiori	OAV	
1991	Oniisama e...	Mariko Shinobu		
1991	Sohryuden: Legend of the Dragon Kings	Toba Matsuri	OAV	
1991	Handsome na Kanojo	Mio Hagiwara		
1991	Genji Tsūshin Agedama	Rei Kuki		
1992	Floral Magician Mary Bell	Remi, Julia		
1992	Ooi! Adatchi おーい！アダッチー	Akko	OVA	
1992	Crayon Shin-chan	Kazama's mother		
1992	Ashita e Free Kick	Kanae Godai, Jun Sugiyama		
1992	Kamasutra	Princess Surya	OVA	
1992	Jeanie with the Light Brown Hair	Kanna		
1993	Gakusaver	Susan Walker		
1993	Idol Defense Force Hummingbird	Kanna Toreishi		
1994	Sailor Moon S	Elsa Gray		
1994	Haō Taikei Ryū Knight	Yellow / Rara Hao		
1994	New Cutie Honey	Death Star	Ep. 1	
1994	Haō Taikei Ryū Knight: Adeu's Legend	Malto		
1994	Samurai Shodown	Charlotte		
1994	Blue Seed	Sakura Yamazaki		
1994	DNA2	Lulara Kawasaki	OAV	
1994	Sins of the Sisters	Kozue Takemiya		
1995	Black Jack	Ikehata Himegimi, Mrs. Taneda	OAV ep. 6	
1995–97	Sorcerer Hunters	Daughter (Dotter), Rin, Meriina	TV series and OVAs	
1995	Golden Boy	Reiko Terayama	OAV	
1995	Haō Taikei Ryū KnightL Adeu's Legend II	Sophie		
1996	Case Closed	Yoshimi, Akemi Miyano	Ep. 6, 129	
1996	Sailor Moon Sailor Stars	Princess Kakyuu		
1996	VS Knight Ramune & 40 Fire	Cocoa		
1996	Legend of Crystania: The Chaos Ring	Sheru / Pirotess		
1996	You're Under Arrest	Natsumi Tsujimoto		
1996	Jewel BEM Hunter Lime	Lime		
1997	Pokémon	Jiiku		
1997	Kindaichi Case Files	Hijirimasa Eiko		
1997–99	Agent Aika	Meipia Arukimetaria		
1998	El-Hazard: The Alternative World	Gilda Hasteroff		
1998	Cyber Team in Akihabara	Miyama Soshigaya (Death Crow)		
1998	Orphen	Stephanie		
1998	Eatman '98	Eimi		
1998	Fushigi Mahou Fan Fan Pharmacy	Potpourri		
1998	Legend of Galactic Heroes	Fia Von Kliengalt		
1999	Space Pirate Mito	Sobo		
1999	Starship Girl Yamamoto Yohko	Rouge		
1999	A.D. Police	Youko Takagi	OAV Ep.3	
1999	Space Pirate Mito	Sobo		
1999	Zoids: Chaotic Century	Carol		
1999–2000	The Big O	Cybele Rohan		
1999	Shūkan Storyland	Mary, Kyoko Hasegawa, Reiko Ota		
2000	Daa! Daa! Daa!	Hitomida Saionji		
2000	Hajime no Ippo	Aiko Date		
2001	Zoids: New Century Zero	Pierce		
2001	You're Under Arrest: Second Season	Natsumi Tsujimoto		
2001	Mistin (Kasumin) ja:カスミン	Choko		
2002	Mirage of Blaze	Ayako Kadowaki		
2002	Tenchi Muyo! GXP	Airi Masaki		
2002	Daigunder	Powaru		
2002	Atashin'chi	Toyama-san		
2002	Samurai Deeper Kyo	Shatora		
2002	Ghost in the Shell: Stand Alone Complex	Tachikoma, Uchikoma		
2002	Midnight Horror School	Onpu, Watt		
2003	Mouse	Doctor	TV Ep. 7–8	
2003	.hack//Legend of the Twilight	Kamui		
2003	D.N. Angel	Emiko Niwa		
2003	Astro Boy	Nicole	Ep. 43	
2003	Rumic Theater	Yuko Haga	TV ep. 1	
2004	Ghost in the Shell: S.A.C. 2nd GIG	Tachikoma, Uchikoma		
2004	Kaiketsu Zorori	Mama Zorori		
2004	Mars Daybreak	Anna Grace		
2004	Sgt. Frog	Fake Celeb Alien	TV ep 224	
2004	Phoenix	Hinaku		
2004	Samurai Champloo	Sarah		
2004	Agatha Christie's Great Detectives Poirot and Marple	Kopuringu		
2004	Fafner in the Azure: Dead Aggressor	Ayano Kondo		
2004	Yakitate! Japan	Monica's mother		
2005	Majime ni Fumajime: Kaiketsu Zorori	Mama Zorori		
2005	Aquarion	Sofia Blanc		
2005	Eureka Seven	Diane Thurston		
2005	Gunparade March	Saika Murata		
2005	Minami no shima no chīsana hikōki bādī' ja:南の島の小さな飛行機 バーディー	Minami Hoeru		
2005	Fafner in the Azure: Right of Left	Ayano Kondo		
2006	Simoun	Onashia		
2006	Witchblade	Rie Nishida		
2006	xxxHolic	Mayuko		
2006	Tsubasa Reservoir Chronicle	Kurogane's mother	TV, second series	
2006	Ghost in the Shell: Stand Alone Complex - Solid State Society	Tachikoma, Uchikoma		
2006	The Galaxy Railways: Crossroads to Eternity	Adele		
2006	Hell Girl: Two Mirrors	Harumi Kanno		
2007	Tōka Gettan	Kiba Yuki		
2007	Devil May Cry	Sara		
2007	You're Under Arrest: Full Throttle	Natsumi Tsujimoto		
2007	Mobile Suit Gundam 00	Lewis's mother		
2007	Ghost Hound	Miki Komori, Security robot		
2008	Yes! PreCure 5 GoGo!	Montblanc		
2008	Kaiba	Negi		
2009	Hajime no Ippo: New Challenger	Aiko Date		
2009	Genji Monogatari Sennenki	Fujitsubo		
2009	Eden of the East	Juiz		
2009	GA Geijutsuka Art Design Class	Health Teacher		
2009	Darker than Black: Gemini of the Meteor	Asako Makimiya		
2010	HeartCatch PreCure!	Rumi Shiku		
2011	Dragon Crisis!	Hanewa Kirasagi		
2011	Shōwa Monogatari	Kanoko Yamazaki		
2012	From the New World	Minoshiro Modoki		
2014-18	Yo-kai Watch	Satoko Hayashi		
2014–15	Cross Ange	Jasmine		
2020	Breakers	Jasmine		
2020	Ghost in the Shell: SAC_2045	Tachikoma		

=== Theatrical animation ===
List of voice performances in feature films
Year	Series	Role	Notes	Source
1989	Doraemon: Nobita and the Birth of Japan	Tarane		
1991	Ranma ½: Big Trouble in Nekonron, China	Lychee		
1995	Doraemon: Nobita's Diary of the Creation of the World	Shizu Minamoto		
1995	Junkers Come Here	Yoko Inoue		
1995	Legend of Crystania	Pirotess / Sheru		
1998	Rennyo Monogatari	Nyoen		
1998	Spriggan	Miss Margaret		
1999	Crayon Shin-chan: Explosion! The Hot Spring's Feel Good Final Battle	Kazama's mother		
1999	You're Under Arrest: The Movie	Natsumi Tsujimoto		
1999	Cyber Team in Akihabara	Miyama Soshigaya		
2000	Crayon Shin-chan: The Storm Called The Jungle	Kazama's mother		
2001	Case Closed: Countdown to Heaven	Akemi Miyano		
2001	Crayon Shin-chan: The Storm Called: The Adult Empire Strikes Back	Kazama's mother		
2002	Hamtaro the movie: Princess of Phantom	Shera Hime		
2003	Atashin'chi	Toyoma-san		
2006	Crayon Shin-chan: The Legend Called: Dance! Amigo!	Kazama's mother		
2009	Crayon Shin-chan: Roar! Kasukabe Animal Kingdom	Kazama's mother		
2009	Eureka Seven: Good Night, Sleep Tight, Young Lovers	Nirvash		
2009	Summer Wars	Rika Jinnouchi		
2009	Eden of the East the Movie I: The King of Eden	Juiz		
2010	Eden of the East the Movie II: Paradise Lost	Juiz, Akane, Fumie, Yuko, Akiko		
2010	Atashinchi: The 3D Movie	Toyama-san		
2011	Fullmetal Alchemist: The Sacred Star of Milos	Miranda		
2012	009 Re:Cyborg	001 (Ivan Whiskey)		
2013	Pretty Cure All Stars New Stage 2: Friends of the Heart	En'en		
2013	Crayon Shin-chan: Very Tasty! B-class Gourmet Survival!!	Mineko Kazama		
2014	Pretty Cure All Stars New Stage 3: Eternal Friends	En'en		
2014	Crayon Shin-chan: Serious Battle! Robot Dad Strikes Back	Kazama's mother		
2015	Crayon Shin-chan: My Moving Story! Cactus Large Attack!	Kazama's mother		

=== Video games ===
List of voice performances in video games
Year	Series	Role	Notes	Source
1994	Brandish	Dora	PC Engine	
1994	Power Dolls 2	Hardy Newland	PS1/PS2	
1995	Wrestle Angels: Double Impact	Chigusa Yuki	other	
1995	Blue Seed: The Legend of Hiroku Kushinada	Sakura Yamazaki	Sega Saturn	
1995	Space Griffon VF-9	Francis	PlayStation	
1996	Bishojo Variety Game: Rapyulus Panic	Maria	Sega Saturn	
1997	Standby Say You ja:スタンバイSay You!	Irene	PS1/PS2	
1997	Quo Vadis 2	Emma O'Connor	Sega Saturn	
1997	Desire	Kazumi M Granchester	Sega Saturn	
1997	My Dream: On Air ga Matenakute	Kiriko Asakura	PS1/PS2	
1997	Galaxy Fraulein Yuna 3: Lightning Angel	Tenmain Suzuma	Sega Saturn	
1998	Galaxy Fraulein Yuna: Final Edition	Tenmain Suzuma	PS1/PS2	
1998	3X3 Eyes: Tenrinou Genmu	Eparu	PS1/PS2	
1999	Power Stone	Rouge	DC	
1999	Ace Combat 3: Electrosphere	Martha Yoko Inoue	PS1/PS2	
1999	Akihabara Dennougumi Pata-Pies!		Dreamcast	
2000	Popolocrois Story II	Fairy Queen Media, Great Earth Dragon Ursula	PS1/PS2	
2000	Power Stone 2	Rouge	DC	
2001	Eithea (Aishia)	Akiho Yoshinaga	PlayStation	
2001	You're Under Arrest	Natsumi Tsujimoto	PS1/PS2	
2001	Eve: The Fatal Attraction ja:EVE The Fatal Attraction	Ami Kurusuno	PS1/PS2	
2002	Zoids Vs.	Pierce, Franc	other	
2002	Moeyo Ken	Eruru	PS1/PS2	
2002	Zoids Saga series	Fran Vogel	other	
2003	The Key of Avalon	Diadora	Arcade	
2003	Zoids vs. II	Pierce, Franc	other	
2004	Zoids vs. III	Pierce, Franc	other	
2005	Fullmetal Alchemist 3: Kami o Tsugu Shōjo	Verda	PS1/PS2	
2006	Gunparade Orchestra: Shiro no Shou	Saika Murata	PS1/PS2	
2006	Onimusha: Dawn of Dreams	Minoyoshi	PS1/PS2	
2006	Crayon Shin-Chan: Densetsu o Yobu Omake no To Shukkugaan!	Mineko Kazama	other	
2006	Gunparade Orchestra: Midori no Shou	Saika Murata	PS1/PS2	
2006	Gunparade Orchestra: Ao no Shou	Ayaka Murata	PS1/PS2	
2007	Case Closed: The Mirapolis Investigation	Megumi Oikawa	Wii	
2009	Super Robot Wars NEO	Cocoa	Wii	
2010	Crayon Shin-Chan: Obaka Daininden – Susume! Kasukabe Ninja Tai!	Mineko Kazama		
2012	Crayon Shin-Chan Shokkugan! Densetsu o Yobu Omake Daiketsusen!! ja:クレヨンしんちゃん 伝説を呼ぶ オマケの都ショックガーン!	Mineko Kazama		
2013	Super Robot Wars: Operation Extend ja:スーパーロボット大戦Operation Extend	Cocoa		

=== Audio dramas ===
List of voice dub performances in audio dramas
Series	Role	Notes	Source
Alien Kaibyouden	Akiba Miyagi	audio cassette	
Beast Master Miakisu		drama CD	
Desire	Kazumi M. Granchester	CD	
Hourai Gakuen no Hatsukoi!	Beatrice Kanuma (Becky)	CD	
Idol Boueitai Hummingbird	Kanna Toreishi	cassette, CD	
Lamune & 40 DX	Cocoa	CD	
Scrapped Princess: Fifth Movement: Rakuueru, dance	Dana	drama CD	
Sorcerer Hunters	Dotter	CD	
Starship Girl Yamamoto Yohko	Rouge	CD	
Star Pinky Q	Queen Shiruru	CD	
True Stories	Yuki	CD	

=== Dubbing roles ===
List of voice dub performances in overseas productions
Series	Role	Voice dub for / Notes	Source
The Adventures of Elmo in Grouchland	Zoe		
Aliens	Newt	1989/1993 TV Asahi editions	
Austin Powers: The Spy Who Shagged Me	Felicity Shagwell	Heather Graham	
Braveheart	Princess Isabella of France	Sophie Marceau	
The Cable Guy	Robin Harris	Leslie Mann	
Dae Jang Geum	Min Mee-geum	Kim So-yi, Korean TV drama	
Dancer in the Dark	Selma Ježková	Björk	
Edward Scissorhands	Kim Boggs	Winona Ryder	
Gremlins	Kate Beringer	Phoebe Cates	
Gremlins 2: The New Batch	Kate Beringer	Phoebe Cates	
Little House on the Prairie	Laura	Melissa Gilbert	
A Little Romance	Lauren King	Diane Lane	
Live and Let Die	Solitaire	Jane Seymour, 1988 TBS edition	
Mortified	Brittany Flune	Maia Mitchell	
The NeverEnding Story	The Childlike Empress	Tami Stronach, TV edition	
Once Upon a Time in China	"13th Aunt" Yee Siu-kwan	Rosamund Kwan	
Once Upon a Time in China II	"13th Aunt" Yee Siu-kwan	Rosamund Kwan	
Once Upon a Time in China III	"13th Aunt" Yee Siu-kwan	Rosamund Kwan	
Planet Terror	Dakota McGraw Block	Marley Shelton	
Sesame Street	Zoe, Prairie Dawn		
The Sound of Music	Louisa von Trapp	Heather Menzies, Fuji TV edition	
