= Zoids: Genesis =

Japanese anime television series

- Promotional poster from Zoids: Genesis, first aired in Japan by TV Tokyo

ゾイドジェネシス (Zoido Jeneshisu)
- Genre: Adventure, Mecha, Military
- Anime television series
- Directed by: Kazunori Mizuno
- Produced by: Fukashi Azuma; Toshihiro Nakazawa
- Written by: Satoru Nishizono
- Music by: Kōtarō Nakagawa
- Studio: Shogakukan Music & Digital Entertainment
- Licensed by: US: Viz Media (Cancelled)
- Original network: TV Tokyo, Cartoon Network (Philippines)
- Original run: April 10, 2005 – March 26, 2006
- Episodes: 50
- Other series
- List of all Zoids series

Zoids Genesis (ゾイドジェネシス, Zoido Jeneshisu) is the fourth anime installment of the Zoids franchise. It tells the story of Ruuji Familon, a young boy who finds a Liger-type Zoid during a salvage mission. Initially, the village is attacked by Bio-Raptor Bio-Zoids, and later a Bio-Megaraptor. After the village generator is destroyed in combat, Ruuji takes the Murasame Liger Zoid and leaves the village alongside Ra-Kan and Rei Mii to find a generator mechanic or the village will be destroyed. Through his journey Ruuji learns he must fight against Digald. It aired on TV Tokyo from April 2005 to March 2006.

In July 2006, the series was announced to appear as a part of Toonami Jetstream, an online internet streaming project featuring current Toonami shows and all-new titles. Viz Media has indeed licensed the show as of August 2007,. However, Toonami Jetstream was removed from the internet shortly after the Toonami television block was removed, so it is unknown if Zoids: Genesis will ever get a North American release, online or otherwise. It has been shown, however, in several markets of South East Asia with local English dubbing on Cartoon Network Saturday mornings.

== Series background ==
Much like Zoids: Fuzors, Genesis still takes place on Planet Zi, and also seems to share no connection to the previous series. The show takes a more post-apocalyptic setting, following a cataclysmic environmental/geological event known as "Gods' Fury" that has destroyed much of the civilizations on Zi and devastated the planet. Many of Zi's survivors have created new civilizations with the use of giant structures called "Generators" that are scattered around the planet. However, out of the ashes of "Gods' Fury", the technology of the Zoids still existed and are constantly excavated for human use. The show returns to the more adventurous and war-themed styles reminiscent of Zoids: Chaotic Century. It focuses on a boy named Ruuji who lives in a small seaside village called Miroodo and eventually becomes the pilot of the Murasame Liger after excavating it from the ocean.

== Plot ==
Generations ago on planet Zi, at the height of human development, Zoids were used in an epic war that eventually led to the destruction of the world. So devastated was the world that the planet was barely habitable for humanity and nature. The catastrophe was named "Gods' Fury" and was considered a supernatural event by locals who believed the world was punished because of humanity's foolishness.

Using one of their most powerful and largest Zoids, the surviving people of this conflict rode on Gildragons for safety and shelter. While one group returned to the earth and founded Iron Rock City, another group built a floating city in the heavens called Sky City. The people there rebuilt their society and eventually began researching ways to restore the planet. After many years of research, they planned to use their advanced bio-mechanical technology to restore the world in order to eventually re-inhabit the land their ancestors almost destroyed; as they lived in their advanced city, they became hubris, comfortable where they are and no longer desired to return.

Although not returning, the technology they developed was implemented upon the planet, which utilized to what the surviving locals refer as generators. It has unique capabilities to maintain energy and growth for machinery and life in the surrounding area. Eventually, Sky City would encounter energy depletion and scouted Zi with their own secret agents. As other agents monitored the growth and progress of the humans that survived "Gods' Fury," others approached people to make special arrangements. The council of Sky City chose a city called Digu and traded off advanced technology for Reggel (universal energy resource, like oil, from their generators). Their arrangement not only involved treaties, but also sending a Sky citizen to be adopted as part of the agreement. The King of Digu would accept Jiin as his son and Digu has since invested resources and developed their own technologies to form their own army, the Digald Army. Eventually, Digald would mass-produce their own special units, Bio-Zoids (a nigh-indestructible unit in combat, only weakness is weapons made of Zi-alloy and damage inside its mouth), with the aid of technology provided by Iron Rock.

The Bio Zoids were made in rapid numbers and gradually started conquering neighboring villages, towns, and cities that had generators to help produce more energy for Digald's energy consumption. They used special stones that could detect a human's ability to pilot a Bio-Zoid and drafted them into Digald forces, never to see their friends and family again. Though known and feared throughout the continent, people couldn't do much to defend themselves as their Zoids were no match against the formidable armor of the Bio-Zoids and they couldn't survive without having a generator; people either surrendered or were destroyed.

The story of Zoids Genesis actually begins around here, as Lord Ra-Kan (heir to the Kira Kingdom) roams the world with Princess Mii (niece to Ra-Kan) after his kingdom has fallen to Digald. Though his kingdom had fallen, Kira's survivors rebuilt a new city called Zuuri in a new secret location far from Digald's influence. Young Ruuji Familon was working with his father to help recover Zoids from the bottom of the ocean in their village, Miroodo. While Mii and Ra-Kan was within the local area, so was Major Zairin (a top commander of Digald). Zairin would discover that Miroodo had a small generator for Digald forces to claim; his troops arrived and attacked Miroodo. Ruuji could never activate a Zoid, but the situation was dire and he jumped into the just-excavated Murasame Liger (that utilizes a Zi-alloy katana). This Zoid answered to Ruuji's call and activated to aid him against the Bio-Raptors attacking his village.

Ra-Kan and Mii joined Ruuji in their fight against Digald. Eventually, a battle between Zairin and Ruuji lead to the accidental damage to Miroodo's generator. With the generator damaged, this led to the fear of Miroodo's destruction (as all settlements depended on them); Ra-Kan agreed to aid Ruuji in finding a generator mechanic. This quest for finding a generator repairman would lead Ruuji to befriend Kotona (formally trained assassin of Iron Rock), Garaga (former anti-Digald rebel leader), Ron (Sky City spy agent), and Seijuurou (former Zoid champion and Ruuji's combat teacher; dying from cancer). In between Ruuji's quest, they discovered Murasame Liger had the ability to evolt (change combat forms) into Hayate Liger (high-speed combat form) and it played a pivotal role in their survival. Eventually though, Ruuji and his Liger would play a larger role in things to come.

Through their adventures, Ruuji was unable to find a person capable of repairing the generator; his travels made him realize even if the generator could be fixed, Digald's expansion will eventually rule everything including Miroodo; Ruuji suggested to Ra-Kan to fight against Digald and eventually Ra-Kan agreed that Digald's expansion couldn't continue. With the resources and forces of Zuuri, Ra-Kan began organizing a counter-offense army. They invited many resistance groups to their cause, but only a few had interest in joining them as there was strong fear and reluctance to confront the Digald Army; with the eventual successes of the Digald Suppression Army, their reputation garnered the attention of many and their forces eventually grew in numbers.

Ron had always been concerned about Jiin's activities and secretly utilized his advanced resources to help Ruuji and Ra-Kan; the team was eventually introduced to Sky City (where Seijuurou was cured of his condition) in hopes to convince the council to provide aid in their cause. Unfortunately, the council was not moved to assist as they felt the troubles below don't concern them nor thought of Jiin as a serious threat against their superior technologies; that would be proven terribly wrong. In Sky City's hubris, Jiin betrayed his own people and launched Bio-Raptor Guis on an aerial assault against Sky City and sank the citadel; many of its citizens survived and found refuge in Zuuri, but they had difficulty adapting to primitive life and forced to recognize their conceit. It was only then the Sky City elders revealed their original intent to the rebellion: they intended Jiin to take over Digald to have an Earth-based vassal force for military might as well as long term reggel supply. Unfortunately, Jiin's ambition was too great and they were betrayed by their overconfidence in controlling him, leading to their demise. With Sky City destroyed, there was no real power left to oppose him, except for the resistance forces, which he considered as a mere nuisance.

Meanwhile, Jiin's power and influence grew within Digu. After the death of their king, Jiin declared himself emperor and eventually a god to Digald. His new policies were not only more draconian, but it alienated many of the officers under Jiin. However, it was not an issue to Jiin, since he is able to extract human souls into the bodies of Bio-Zoid droid pilots; he tripled his forces without the need for human pilots. Zairin was obsessed with defeating Ruuji until he discovered the shocking truth of their bolstered forces, it snapped him out of his obsession and caused him to defect. Eventually, word had spread within Digald forces about their pilots were extracted human souls, many of Digald Forces defected to the Digald Suppression Army.

After long hard battles against Digald Forces, it was an unusual alliance when most of the human officers of Digald defected to the anti-Digald army. Ruuji felt their anti-Digald army title was no longer appropriate and renamed themselves the Jiin Suppression Army. A large final battle was waged against Jiin in his Bio-Tyranno. After a very difficult fight, Ruuji destroyed Jiin with Mugen Liger (evolt form after Hayate Liger) and ended the conflict to restore peace to the lands. After the battle, it was discovered that Murasame Liger had unique regeneration technologies that can help revive Miroodo's generator; Ruuji returned to his village and helped restore life back to his hometown.

== Characters ==
- Ruuji Familon
- Ra-Kan
- Rei-Mii
- Kotona Elegance
- Thunder Galaga
- Ron Mangan
- Seijuurou
- Tize
- Hou
- Paruburo
- Dinga
- Hakku
- Danbul
- Gaball
- Kanpyuu
- Zantsu
- Bon Tigger
- Zairin
- Jiin
- Felme
- Georg
- Souta/Gin
- Whips De Zaltz
- Muteki-Dan
- Rinna Elegance

== Zoids ==
Despite the disaster a thousand years ago, Zoids are still in use by the nations and cities of planet Zi. The main difference between other series is the use of a substance called Regel. Originating from a series of tree-like generators that help maintain the planet's ecosystem, Regel is an orange, sap-like fluid which Zoids depend on. Because of the sheer size and intake volume needed, it is possible that Zoids use it for maintenance functions, like lubricant oil, rather than as an energy source; it may also be used in this way to prevent Zoids from spreading too far away from human control.

=== Protagonist Zoids ===
The seven Zoids used by the protagonists are all armed with a metal Zi weapon, capable of disintegrating Digald armor. Because of their inferior numbers, they are occasionally overwhelmed by greater forces. The seven Zoids are;

- Murasame Liger: Ruuji's Liger-type Zoid
- Sword Wolf: Ra-Kan's wolf-type Zoid.
- Lance Stag: Rei Mii's moose-type Zoid.
- Rainbow Jerk: A peafowl-type aerial Zoid piloted by Kotona Elegance.
- Deadly Kong: A large gorilla-type Zoid piloted by Garaga.
- Bambu Lion: A panda-type Zoid piloted by Ron.
- Soul Tiger: A Zoid that resembles the Rayse Tiger, except that it's white and the "energy lines" are red instead of green. It has four large claws on each paw and is very fast. Piloted by Seijuurou.

=== Digald Zoids ===
The militaristic nation of Digald has been steadily expanding across planet Zi, meeting little opposition. Occupied cities have their populations used as forced labor or Zoid pilots. The key to their success has been a silver-plating over their Zoids, which is immune to beam-weaponry. However, it is extremely vulnerable to high temperatures, or the effect of weapons made from a substance called metal Zi. Upon contact with either of these, the silver-coating melts and evaporates, and the internal crimson structure disintegrates, leaving only bleached white skeletons.

Zoids piloted by higher-ranking officers have gold claws or spikes that can block metal Zi weapons, though these are rare. The pilots, unlike most Zoids, remain suspended in a dark cockpit, and wear bulky suits with connecting wires to control their Zoids. Most are controlled using humanoid drones with rotary, three-eyed helmets, later revealed to be the drained consciousness of occupied peoples encased in robotic forms. Later model commander-type Bio-zoids such as the Bio-Volcano and presumably the Bio-Kentro have armor made of crystal that are completely resistant to Metal Zi weapons.

== Theme songs ==
Opening

1. "夜鷹の夢" (Yotaka no Yume, Nighthawk's Dream) by Do As Infinity

Endings

1. "Real Love" by PARADISE GO!!GO!!
2. "ありのままでLovin'U (Arino Mamade Lovin'U)" by Shizuka Ito (Kotona) & Kimiko Koyama (Re Mii) (First Airing ep. 29)
3. "握りしめたその手に (Nigirishimeta sono Te ni)" by Shizuka Ito (Kotona) & Kimiko Koyama (Re Mii) (First Airing ep. 44)

== Notes ==
- There is doubt whether or not the series actually takes place on Zi. Both the "Generators" and the Zoid fuel "Reggel" (a red, viscous liquid that occurs naturally) have never appeared in any previous Zoids material, however since the planetary catastrophe, the make-up of Planet Zi is now completely different, mostly due to the seeding of the "Generators" throughout the planet. Additionally, a map on the back of the limited Lanstag model depicts a continent that does not match any of Zi's four continents at all. There was a planetary catastrophe of extreme magnitude, the continents would have taken new forms, everything about Planet Zi changed. However, the intro does state that the Zoids live on Planet Zi. All other zoids series have taken place on Planet Zi in chronological order, with Zoids Genesis taking place far after Zoids: Fuzors. During the Zoids: Genesis series, the fact is revealed that a far more advanced way-of-life existed on their planet. Zoids: Fuzors is the only zoids series to have featured an advanced civilization, which occurs before Zoids: Genesis. With a planetary catastrophe of such magnitude, causing the surviving populace across the entire planet to return to the Stone Age, even the name of said homeworld can become forgotten with time.
- What is notable about the Zoids featured in the said intro is that all of them are Zoids from the previous series, Zoids Fuzors. Some of the identifiable ones are as follows:
  - Scissor Storm
  - König Wolf MkII
  - Gorhecks
  - Dispelow
  - Energy Liger
  - Gojulas Giga
  - Godos
  - Styluarmor
  - Gairyuki
  - Storm Sworder
  - Seismosaurus
  - Berserk Führer (Fury)
  - Evo Flyer
  - Guysak
  - Blade Liger
  - Liger Zero

== Game appearances ==
Zoids: Genesis first appearance in video games is in Zoids Saga DS: Legend of Arcadia for the Nintendo DS.

Zoids Genesis also featured extensively in Zoids:Full Metal Crash (released October 27, 2005) for Nintendo GameCube. Murasame Liger and Deadly Kong are playable Zoids. Ruuji Familon, Rei Mii, Thunder Garaga and Zairin are available as selectable/playable pilots.

The series was included in the Super Robot Wars game Super Robot Wars K, also for the Nintendo DS. This came as a surprise to many SRW fans given that the video game franchise is developed by merchandising rival Namco Bandai; Sunrise (a Namco Bandai subsidiary) was involved in the other series owned by Takara-Tomy that have been featured in SRW.

ZOIDS Genesis made its return to SRW and was featured along with ZOIDS: Chaotic Century in Super Robot Wars: Operation Extend
