= Tiko and the Shark =

- English-language release poster
- Directed by: Folco Quilici
- Based on: Ti-Coyo and His Shark by Clement Richer
- Produced by: Goffredo Lombardo
- Starring: Al Kauwe; Marlene Among; Dennis Pouira; Diane Samsoi
- Cinematography: Pier Ludovico Pavoni
- Edited by: Mario Serandrei
- Music by: Francesco De Masi
- Distributed by: Titanus (Italy)
- Release date: October 18, 1962
- Running time: 88 minutes
- Countries: France; Italy

Tiko and the Shark (Italian: Ti-Koyo e il suo pescecane) is a 1962 film directed by Folco Quilici and based on a novel Ti-Coyo and His Shark by Clement Richer. An international co-production of France and Italy, the film's plot follows the friendship between a fisherman and a shark that begins in their youth. Filming took place on location in French Polynesia.

== Cast ==
- Al Kauwe as Ti-Koyo
  - Dennis Pouira as Ti-Koyo as a child
- Marlene Among as Diana
  - Diane Samsoi as Diana as a child

== Reception ==
Leo Pestelli, writing for La Stampa, criticized the film for its perceived focus on the relationship between Ti-Koyo and his human love interest as opposed to his relationship with the shark.
