= Fumie Kusachi =

Japanese singer and voice actress (born 1969)

- 草地 章江
- Born: November 24, 1969 (age 56); Tokyo, Japan
- Occupation: Voice actress
- Years active: 1993–2003
- Children: 1

Fumie Kusachi (草地 章江, Kusachi Fumie; born November 24, 1969 in Tokyo, Japan) is a Japanese singer and voice actress.

== Filmography ==
Year	Title	Role	Notes	Source
1993	Idol Defense Force Hummingbird	Uzuki Toreishi	OVA	
1993	Kyō Kara Ore Wa!!	Riko Akasaka	OVA	
1996	Twin Signal	No. 3	OVA	
1996	Gall Force: The Revolution	Lufy	OVA	
1997–03	Crayon Shin-chan	Micchi Hatogaya	TV series	
1997	Demon Fighter Kocho	Koran Enoki	OVA	
1998	Fancy Lala	Miki Yumeno	TV series	
1999	Crayon Shin-chan: Explosion! The Hot Spring's Feel Good Final Battle	Micchi Hatogaya	Movie	
2000	Crayon Shin-chan: Jungle That Invites Storm	Micchi Hatogaya	Movie	
2003	Crayon Shin-chan: Fierceness That Invites Storm! Yakiniku Road of Honor	Micchi Hatogaya	Movie	

=== Video games ===
List of voice performances in video games
Year	Title	Role	Platform(s)	Notes
1992	Dōkyūsei	Aiko Saito	PC-98, MS-DOS, X68000, FM Towns, TurboGrafx-16 (PC Engine), Sega Saturn, Windows	
1993	Princess Maker 2	Marcia Shareware	PC-98, FM Towns, TurboGrafx-16 (PC Engine), Sega Saturn, MS-DOS, Windows, Macintosh, GP32, PlayStation 2	
1996	Virgin Dream	Yuria Tsunoda	TurboGrafx-16 (PC Engine)	
1996	No-Appointment Gals Olympos	Little Jishan/Ruya Ngava	PlayStation, Sega Saturn	
1997	Dōkyūsei Majong	Aiko Saito	PlayStation	
1998	The Kindaichi Case Files: Hell Park Murder Case		PlayStation	
1998	Kojin Kyouju: La Leçon Particulière (ja)	Nishimura Nanako	PlayStation	
1998	Debut 21 (ja)	Inoue Miho	PlayStation	
1999	Doki Doki On Air FINAL	Guest	Windows 95/98	

== Discography ==
=== Studio albums ===
Release date	Title	Album information
February 21, 1989	NOT ALONE	Label: Hummingbird; Catalog No.: 32HD-7020
October 21, 1989	MAGICAL BEAT	Label: Hummingbird; Catalog No.: 32HD-7024
December 7, 1994	WINGS OF ANGEL	Label: Toshiba EMI; Catalog No.: TYCY-5411
June 21, 1996	FACES	Label: Sony Music Entertainment; Catalog No.: SRCL-3598
June 20, 1998	Pure	Label: Nippon Columbia; Catalog No.: COCC-15092

=== Singles ===
Release date	Title	Album information
February 21, 1989	Sailing Alone	Label: Hummingbird; Catalog No.: 10HD-2022
June 21, 1989	Kimi wa naniiro ni kagayaite? (君は何色に輝きたい？)	Label: Hummingbird; Catalog No.: 10HD-2027
October 21, 1989	Dai kkirai! (大ッキライ！)	Label: Hummingbird; Catalog No.: 10HD-2029
March 10, 1993	Love Wing	Label: Toshiba EMI; Catalog No.: TYDY-2044
November 17, 1993	Romansu ni byōyomi (ロマンスに秒読み)	Label: Toshiba EMI; Catalog No.: TYDY-2051
January 21, 1996	Shiranai. (知らない。)	Label: Sony Music Entertainment; Catalog No.: SRDL-4147
May 22, 1996	Onegai, nani ka itte (お願い、何か言って)	Label: Sony Music Entertainment; Catalog No.: SRDL-4202
August 21, 1996	Shōjiki wa baka o miru (正直はバカを見る)	Label: Sony Music Entertainment; Catalog No.: SRDL-4266
April 21, 1998	IN MY SOUL	Label: Nippon Columbia; Catalog No.: CODC-1471

=== In Idol Defence Force Hummingbird ===
- 1993: Hummingbird FIRST FLIGHT [TYCY-5311]
- 1993: ハミングバード 太陽と裸 [TYCY-5316]
- 1993: 熱狂の"裸・Eve" Summer Aviation Tour '93 [TYCY-5337]
- 1994: ハミングバード '94夏 トラ・トラ・トラ！ [TYCY-5391]
- 1994: ハミングバード外伝"ザッツ・ミュージカル"卯月の反乱～こんな日が来るなんて [TYCY-5398]
- 1995: ハミングバードザッピングCD - Vols. 1–5 [TYCY-5418 - TYCY-5422]
- 1995: ハミングバード 山虎 '95風の唄&夢の場所へ [TYCY-5441]
- 1995: さよならハミングバード [TYCY-5450]
- 1995: Hummingbird GRAND FINALE at SHIBUYA-Kokaido [TYCY-5462/3]
- 1995: Hummingbird SISTERS [TYCY-5471]
