= Idol Defense Force Hummingbird =

Japanese light novel series and its adaptation

アイドル防衛隊ハミングバード (Aidoru Bōeitai Hamingubādo)
- Light novel
- Written by: Hitoshi Yoshioka
- Published by: Fujimi Shobo
- Imprint: Fujimi Fantasia Bunko
- Original run: 1993 – 1994
- Volumes: 2
- Original video animation
- Directed by: Kiyoshi Murayama
- Produced by: Machiu Hattori (1–2); Yukinao Shimoji (1–3); Masako Fukuyo (3–4); Kazunori Hashimoto (4)
- Written by: Kiyoshi Murayama; Ritsuko Hayasaka (4)
- Music by: Takeo Miratsu
- Studio: Ashi Productions
- Released: September 1, 1993 – December 1, 1995
- Runtime: 30–50 minutes
- Episodes: 4
- icon

Idol Defense Force Hummingbird (アイドル防衛隊ハミングバード, Aidoru Bōeitai Hamingubādo) is a two-volume Japanese light novel series written by Hitoshi Yoshioka that tells the very offbeat tale of five idol singer/fighter pilot sisters. It was adapted into an anime series consisting of four OVA episodes that ran from 1993 to 1995.

== Synopsis ==
One day in the near future, the Japanese Self-Defense Force decides to transfer the command (and financing) of their air force to private companies and investors. Most reject the idea as a joke, but some show business-oriented companies catch up on the idea, spawning the birth of a new type of idol: the so-called "Idol Pilots", celebrity combat pilots.

The five Toreishi sisters, Kanna, Yayoi, Satsuki, Uzuki and Mina, are teenage idol singers who are collectively known as The Hummingbirds. They are also one of the ace fighter pilot squadrons in the Japanese military. When they aren't saving the world from major overseas threats, they are on stage in frilly dresses, pursuing their idol career. This is the story of how they came to be Japan's most successful idol group and their first line of defense.

== Characters ==
=== Toreishi Productions ===
==== The Hummingbirds ====
Satsuki Toreishi (取石 皐月, Toreishi Satsuki)
Voiced by: Kotono Mitsuishi
Personal aircraft: HB-03
Satsuki is the third eldest of the Toreishi sisters and the main heroine of the series. Her date of birth is on May 15, age 17 ('95 Song of the Wind, age 18).
The middle sister, Satsuki is very insecure about her looks and her flying ability, the latter of which is ironically perhaps the best of the team. Prone to moments of self-doubt, she can often be coaxed to moments of incredible bravery by mentioning her fighter pilot father, whom she idolises. Indeed, Satsuki's love for her father, who is missing and presumed dead by some, is a major component of her character.
Satsuki's speciality is dogfighting and close-quarters engagement. It is actually her flying that gets the girls noticed by their producer. During a 'turkey-shoot' with the group SNAP, her sisters are swiftly taken out, but despite her best efforts to present an easy target, the incompetence of her opponents wears out her patience, prompting her to bring the F-14 she is flying to a nose-up stop in mid air. She is eventually tagged, but her aircraft stalls and falls. Fortunately, she is able to restart her engines and level out.
Satsuki's preference for such close-quarters combat is reflected by the design of her personal aircraft, an agile air superiority fighter similar in design to the Mikoyan MiG-29 or the Sukhoi Su-27 with a performance envelope comparable, perhaps superior to an F/A-18 Hornet. In concert, Satsuki occasionally duets with Mina.
Kanna Toreishi (取石 神無, Toreishi Kanna)
Voiced by: Sakiko Tamagawa
Personal aircraft: HB-01
Kanna is the eldest of the Toreishi sisters and leader of the Hummingbird squadron team. Her date of birth is on October 16, age 19 ('95 Song of the Wind, age 20).
Kanna is the de facto squadron leader, and a by-the-book operator in every sense of the word. As well as planning and organising the team's tactics, it is she who ensures that both her sisters and her employers both keep their parts of the contract, and is the first to negotiate compromises in the event of disagreement. Although she loves her sisters, she demands a lot from them, and does not tolerate foolishness gladly.
Reflecting her protective big sister role, Kanna's flying style appears to be more of the point defence interceptor. Although she can get up close and personal in the fight, she rarely does. Her personal aircraft is similar in performance to Satsuki's. In concert, Kanna occasionally duets with Yayoi.
Yayoi Toreishi (取石 弥生, Toreishi Yayoi)
Voiced by: Yuri Amano
Personal aircraft: HB-02
Yayoi is the second eldest of the Toreishi sisters. Her date of birth is on March 7, age 18 ('95 Song of the Wind, age 19).
Somewhat tomboyish, Yayoi was initially reluctant to become an idol, but didn't want to be left out. Ebullient and athletic, Yayoi participates in any and every sports meet she can, and takes no quarter when she participates - even against her own sisters. Similarly, when her sisters (read: Mina) annoy her, she lets them know about it, most often with a well-aimed slap to the face.
Along with Satsuki and Kanna, Yayoi is one of the front-line fighters. Unlike Kanna, she is less afraid to get herself in the fight, and has been known to tag-team with Satsuki. Conversely, however, her aircraft seems to be more heavily armed than Satsuki's, and makes heavier use of its VTOL systems (indeed, using them to launch from base).
Uzuki Toreishi (取石 卯月, Toreishi Uzuki)
Voiced by: Fumie Kusachi
Personal aircraft: HB-04
Uzuki is the fourth of the Toreishi sisters. Her date of birth is on April 20, age 15 ('95 Song of the Wind, age 16).
Despite her age, Uzuki's breasts is physically better developed than Satsuki, which fuels her older sister's neuroses. Although Uzuki sometimes presents the air of being a little slow and laidback, she's more than capable of delivering an incisive critique (intentionally or otherwise) to her sisters. Uzuki keeps an unusual hobby: she cares for a tank full of marimo balls, doting on them, and even singing to them. On occasion, she will carry them with her in a baggie.
In the cockpit, Uzuki usually takes the front-seat, with Mina as her co-pilot/RIO/girl-in-back. Uzuki cites the F-4 as her favourite model of aircraft. However, it appears that heavy aircraft are her particular forté, as evidenced by the design of her personal aircraft: a vast, multirole bomber/carrier/supply craft that requires JATO modules to launch from base. In concert, Uzuki is the only one to sing songs solo.
Mina Toreishi (取石 水無, Toreishi Mina)
Voiced by: Hekiru Shiina
Personal aircraft: HB-05
Mina is the youngest of the five Toreishi sisters. Her date of birth is on June 6, age 12 ('95 Song of the Wind, age 13).
Mina is the youngest sister, and acts it. Blessed with a mile-wide mischievous streak, her favourite target is Yayoi. Unfortunately, in targeting her, she is usually playing with fire, and payback is swift and severe. Mina also appears to have a big appetite, as she is often seen eating.
Although she generally plays co-pilot and girl-in-back to Uzuki, Mina does fly solo. Her personal aircraft is an attack helicopter, normally carried aboard Uzuki's craft and deployed mid-air.

==== Personnel ====
Hazuki Toreishi (取石 葉月, Toreishi Hazuki)
Voiced by: Mika Doi
Hazuki is the girls' mother, manager and songwriter. Daughter of a wealthy businessman, who apparently owns the company that built the girls' aircraft, Hazuki has inherited her father's business acumen, and seemingly passed it on to Kanna. She also acts as the liaison between the Air Force and the team. In essence, Hazuki is the team's commanding officer, with Kanna playing executive officer - Hazuki negotiates the contracts, Kanna ensures they are carried out.
Shunsaku Kudou (工藤 俊作, Kudou Shunsaku)
Voiced by: Yasunori Matsumoto
Shunsaku is the Hummingbird's record producer. He discovered the girls while they were flying as marks for another act, and was impressed enough to negotiate a contract with their mother. A former member of the air force (it is not made clear which branch of the service he served in, but he is a qualified pilot), his previous career was helpful in part when the girls had to disarm bombs placed in their aircraft by Yajima's people.
Shinobu Ijūin (伊集院 忍, Ijūin Shinobu)
Voiced by: Katsumi Suzuki
Shinobu is the Hummingbird's executive manager, usually overseeing the girls' public appearances.
Yasuda (安田, Yasuda)
Voiced by: Masami Kikuchi
Shunsaku's assistant and cameraman.
Bun Toreishi (取石 文, Toreishi Bun)
Voiced by: Hiroshi Naka
The grandfather of the Hummingbirds, who also oversaw the design and construction of the sisters' combat planes.
Yuma Toreishi (取石 優馬, Toreishi Yūma)
Voiced by: Hideyuki Hori
The Toreishi sisters' father who disappeared years ago during a flight mission.

=== Yajima Office ===
==== SNAP ====
SNAP were a popular four-man idol pilot boy band represented by Yajima Office. Ostensibly led by media darling and fan-favourite Kakkun, the team had a huge following of rabid fans, despite their incompetence in the air. The group flew F-16s.

SNAP are, indirectly, responsible for getting Hummingbird on the map. They have gone up against the Toreishi sisters twice—in their first encounter, the girls were contractually obliged to play sitting ducks, but the lengths to which they went to present obvious targets got them noticed. During their next encounter, they were effortlessly picked off by a grossly handicapped Hummingbird, who made their debut.

==== Fever Girls ====
The Fever Girls are a duo of beautiful idol pilots under contract by Yajima. Originally fierce rivals of the Hummingbirds, they become friends with them (and especially with Satsuki) after a particularly foul bit of play by their boss.

Hitomi Nakajo (中條 仁美, Nakajō Hitomi)
Voiced by: Yūko Mizutani
Age 19 ('95 Song of the Wind, age 20). She has a long ponytail hairstyle. Her height is 164 cm and her three-sizes are B96/W60/H85.
Reiko Hosokawa (細川 れいこ, Hosokawa Reiko)
Voiced by: Maya Okamoto
Age 20 ('95 Song of the Wind, age 21). She has a purple, wavy hairstyle. Her height is 163 cm and her three-sizes are B94/W58/H84.

==== Personnel ====
Yajima (矢島, Yajima)
Voiced by: Kei Tomiyama, later Kōichi Yamadera
Head of the Yajima Office management agency, which handles such acts as SNAP - the Toreishis' first competitors - and, later, the Fever Girls. Initially, Yajima is ruthless to a disturbing degree: When the Hummingbirds debut, once again flying against SNAP, he stipulates that the girls fly ageing F-4s in ridiculous - and deliberately unergonomic - animal costumes in order to hamper their chances. When this ploy is unsuccessful, thanks to both the girls' flying ability and a free-flight compromise negotiated by Kanna, he attempts to acquire the girls for his own company. When this is knocked back, he gradually ups the stakes in his attempts to ruin the Toreishi sisters, courting terrorism and kidnap along the way. His plans are almost always scuppered by the sisters' entourage, technology, sheer luck, or any combination thereof. He appears to be an old flame of Hazuki's from before the days of her marriage, and although initially her rival in the show business, he redeems himself in the '95 OVAs by having the Hummingbirds sanctioned as an official UN squad when they take off to rescue the Fever Girls.
Hebinuma (蛇沼, Hebinuma)
Voiced by: Fumihiko Tachiki
Goro Katou (加藤 五郎, Katou Gorou)
Voiced by: Ryoutarou Okiayu
Goro is a friend of the Toreishi family, having trained under and flown with the girls' father. He appears in episode 2, after resigning from a NATO task force to work for Yajima Office as the Fever Girls' flying coach. Despite this, he remains friendly to his old mentor's family, even going so far as to give Satsuki much-needed encouragement in the face of his own students. In the '95 OVas, he appears only in cameos; it is revealed that he is at that time attempting - with somewhat marginal success - to become a folk singer.

=== Hummingbird '95 characters ===
Petol Devas (ペトル デュヴアス, Petoru Devuasu)
Voiced by: Takehito Koyasu
A petite, eccentric millionaire (whose name is occasionally spelled Petol Gibbers) who runs his own island nation. He is quite wealthy and maintains his own private army, consisting of remote-controlled heavy weapons and a few human goons for more flexible footwork. As it turns out, he is also an idol fanatic, and has taken the Fever Girls captive solely to have them perform an exclusive idol show in a specially built studio in his private residence. The Hummingbirds' rescue of the Fever Girls ultimately ruins their idol career, although the sisters feel no regrets having done so.

== Light novels ==
The light novels are written by Hitoshi Yoshioka.

No.	Title	Japanese release date	Japanese ISBN
1	Idol Defense Force Hummingbird: Act 1 - Humming Bird Debut! (アイドル防衛隊 ハミングバード〈ACT1〉ハミングバード・デビュー!)	June, 1993	4-8291-2503-9
2	Idol Defense Force Hummingbird: Act 2 - No. 6 (アイドル防衛隊 ハミングバード〈ACT2〉ハミングバード6号)	June, 1994	4-8291-2570-5

== OVA series ==
=== Episode list ===
No.	Title	Original release date
1	"Idol Defense Force Hummingbird"; Transliteration: "Aidoru Bōeitai Hamingubādo" (Japanese: アイドル防衛隊ハミングバード)	September 1, 1993
This episode deals with the gradual rise of the Hummingbirds as a popular idol team.
2	"Idol Defense Force Hummingbird '94 Summer"; Transliteration: "Aidoru Bōeitai Hamingubādo '94 Natsu" (Japanese: アイドル防衛隊ハミングバード '94 夏)	June 1, 1994
The Hummingbirds get fierce competition by the idol duo Fever Girls. However, their new coach, Goro Katou, is an old friend of the Hummingbird's father, a fact which sparks an even fiercer determination in the two gorgeous girls - until their boss decides to forgo fairness.
3	"Idol Defense Force Hummingbird '95 Song of the Wind"; Transliteration: "Aidoru Bōeitai Hamingubādo '95 Kaze no Uta" (Japanese: アイドル防衛隊ハミングバード '95 風の歌)	June 1, 1995
While the Hummingbirds' idol career keeps on soaring sky-high, the Fever Girls have taken to more military-oriented jobs. During an escort mission, the Fever Girls are shot down and taken prisoner by the private army of Petol Devas, an eccentric millionaire. When the UN and the Civil Defense Force prove reluctant to mount a rescue attempt, Satsuki decides to go and save her two friends on her own.
4	"Idol Defense Force Hummingbird '95 To the Place of Dreams"; Transliteration: "Aidoru Bōeitai Hamingubādo '95 Yume no Basho e" (Japanese: アイドル防衛隊ハミングバード '95 夢の場所へ)	December 1, 1995
Disregarding the consequences this course of action might have on her idol career, and joined by her sisters, Satsuki attacks Petol Devas's island to free the Fever Girls from captivity.

== Discography ==
Humming Bird
- Origin: Japan
- Genres: J-pop
- Years active: 1993–1995
- Label: Youmex
- Past members: Sakiko Tamagawa; Yuri Amano; Kotono Mitsuishi; Fumie Kusachi; Hekiru Shiina

The main voice actors performed as their characters in a seiyuu group called Humming Bird.

Idol Defense Force Hummingbird Albums
Release date	Album	Label/Catalog Number	Notes
July 14, 1993	Hummingbird FIRST FLIGHT	Label: Youmex; Catalog No.: TYCY-5311	Album
August 18, 1993	Idol Boueitai Hummingbird Taiyou to Hadaka (ハミングバード 太陽と裸)	Label: Youmex; Catalog No.: TYCY-5316	Soundtrack
November 24, 1993	Hummingbird Live: Nekkyo no "Hadaka·Eve" Summer Aviation Tour '93 (熱狂の"裸・Eve" Summer Aviation Tour '93)	Label: Youmex; Catalog No.: TYCY-5337	Live
May 11, 1994	Hummingbird '94 Natsu Tora Tora Tora (ハミングバード '94夏 トラ・トラ・トラ！)	Label: Youmex; Catalog No.: TYCY-5391	Soundtrack
September 28, 1994	Hummingbird Gaiden "Zattsu Myujikaru" Udzuki no Hanran ~ Kon'na ni~ Tsu ga Kuru Nante (ハミングバード外伝"ザッツ・ミュージカル"卯月の反乱～こんな日が来るなんて)	Label: Youmex; Catalog No.: TYCY-5398	Musical Drama
February 17, 1995	Zapping de Shocking Vol. 1 - Satsuki Toreishi (ハミングバードザッピングCD Vol.1 取石皐月編)	Label: Youmex; Catalog No.: TYCY-5418	Drama/Character
February 22, 1995	Zapping de Shocking Vol. 2 - Mina Toreishi (ハミングバードザッピングCD Vol.2 取石水無編)	Label: Youmex; Catalog No.: TYCY-5419	Drama/Character
March 15, 1995	Zapping de Shocking Vol. 3 - Yayoi Toreishi (ハミングバードザッピングCD Vol.3 取石弥生編)	Label: Youmex; Catalog No.: TYCY-5420	Drama/Character
March 15, 1995	Zapping de Shocking Vol. 4 - Uzuki Toreishi (ハミングバードザッピングCD Vol.4 取石卯月編)	Label: Youmex; Catalog No.: TYCY-5421	Drama/Character
March 15, 1995	Zapping de Shocking Vol. 5 - Kanna Toreishi (ハミングバードザッピングCD Vol.5 取石神無編)	Label: Youmex; Catalog No.: TYCY-5422	Drama/Character
May 31, 1995	Hummingbird Original Soundtrack 3 '95 (ハミングバード 山虎 '95風の唄&夢の場所へ)	Label: Youmex; Catalog No.: TYCY-5441	Soundtrack
October 25, 1995	Sayonara Hummingbird (さよならハミングバード)	Label: Youmex; Catalog No.: TYCY-5450	Drama CD
November 8, 1995	Hummingbird GRAND FINALE at SHIBUYA-Kokaido	Label: Youmex; Catalog No.: TYCY-5462/3	Live
December 25, 1995	Hummingbird SISTERS	Label: Youmex; Catalog No.: TYCY-5471	Best Of

Idol Defense Force Hummingbird Singles
Release date	Album	Label/Catalog Number	Notes
March 10, 1993	Love Wing / Setsunai omoi (Love Wing / せつない想い)	Label: Youmex; Catalog No.: TYDY-2044	Single
November 17, 1993	Romansu ni byōyomi / Love Wing (5-ri bājon) (ロマンスに秒読み / Love Wing（5人バージョン）))	Label: Youmex; Catalog No.: TYDY-2051	Single
November 17, 1993	Nakimushi no māmeido / RAINBOW FORCES (泣き虫のマーメイド / RAINBOW FORCES)	Label: Youmex; Catalog No.: TYDY-2052	Single
November 17, 1993	Dakara KISS AGAIN / Koibito-tachi no kurain rein (だからKISS AGAIN / 恋人達のクライン・レイン)	Label: Youmex; Catalog No.: TYDY-2053	Single

=== Theme songs ===
Opening Themes
#	Transcription/Translation	Performed by	Episodes
1	"Love Wing"	Fumie Kusachi	1
2	"Countdown to Romance" (ロマンスに秒読み, Romansu ni byōyomi)	Fumie Kusachi	2
3	"MY BLUE PARADISE"	Fumie Kusachi	3-4

Ending themes
#	Transcription/Translation	Performed by	Episodes
1	"Desperate Feelings" (せつない想い, Setsunai Omoi)	Humming Bird	1
2	"RAINBOW FORCES"	Humming Bird	2
3	"Broken Hearted Last Night" (失恋前夜, Shitsuren Zenya)	Humming Bird	3
4	"To the Place of Dreams" (夢の場所へ, Yume no Basho e)	Humming Bird	4

Insert Songs
#	Transcription/Translation	Performed by	Episodes
1	"I Love You After All" (やっぱり大好き, Yappari Daisuki)	Humming Bird	1
2	"(Don't Worry) I Won't Feel Rejected" (ふられたなんて思ってないから, Furaretanante Omottenaikara)	Humming Bird	1
3	"Crying Rain of Lovers" (恋人たちのクライン·レイン, Koibitotachi no Kurain Rein)	Humming Bird	2
4	"And So Kiss Again" (だからkiss again, Dakara kiss again)	Humming Bird	2
5	"A Crybaby Mermaid" (泣き虫のマーメイド, Nakimushi no Māmeido)	Kotono Mitsuishi	2
6	"I Can't be a Good Girl" (いい娘ではいられない, Iiko Dewa Irarenai)	Sakiko Tamagawa & Yuri Amano	3
7	"Passion" (情熱, Jounetsu)	Humming Bird	4

== Production ==
Staff

- Author: Hitoshi Yoshioka
- Director: Kiyoshi Murayama
- Character Design: Masahide Yanagisawa
- Art Director: Chitose Asakura, Torao Arai and Yoshimi Umino
- Director of Photography: Kazunori Hashimoto and Mitsuru Sugiura
- Sound Director: Hideyuki Tanaka
- Music: Takeo Miratsu

Company

- Production: Toho Company, Ltd., Toshiba EMI and Youmex
- Animation Production: Ashi Productions
- In-Between Animation: J.C.Staff, Kino Production and Pastel
- Music Production: Toshiba EMI

== Home media releases ==
In the Western hemisphere, Idol Defense Force Hummingbird was published in the UK as a subtitled VHS video combining the 93 and 94 episodes in 1994. There have been no subsequent video releases of the 95 episodes, or any DVD publications since.
