= Cesare Barbetti =

Italian actor (1930–2006)

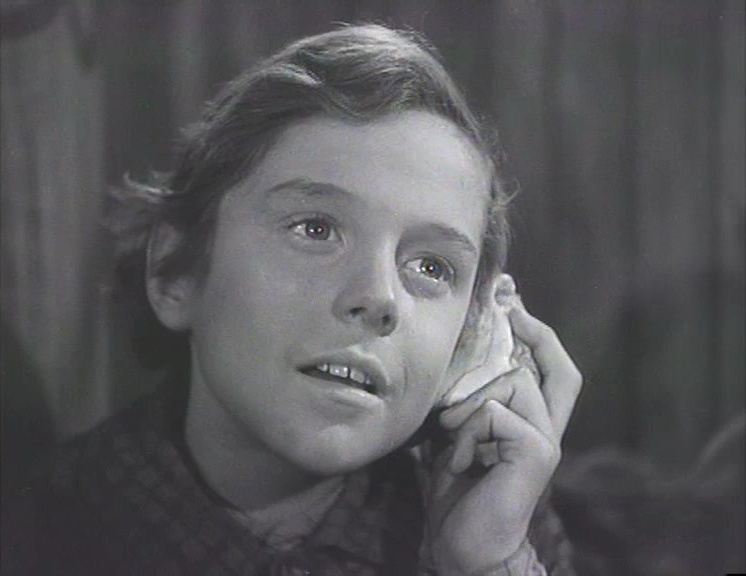
- Barbetti in Dagli Appennini alle Ande (1943)
- Born: 29 September 1930; Palermo, Italy
- Died: 13 September 2006 (aged 75); Lucca, Italy
- Occupations: Actor; voice actor; dubbing director
- Years active: 1934–2006

Cesare Barbetti (29 September 1930 – 13 September 2006) was an Italian actor and voice actor.

== Biography ==
Born in Palermo to parents who were both actors, Barbetti started off his career as a child actor during the Fascist era in 1934 making an uncredited appearance in The Three-Cornered Hat. After his career as a child actor ended, Barbetti became a very successful voice actor and dubber, dubbing foreign-language films for the Italian market. He was the official Italian voice of Robert Redford.

Other actors Barbetti was known for dubbing also included Robert Duvall, Warren Beatty, Steve McQueen, Kevin Kline, Steve Martin, Rutger Hauer and Dick Van Dyke. He was recognised for voicing Ken Hutch in the Italian version of Starsky & Hutch. In Barbetti's animated roles, he served as the Italian voice of Doc Hudson in the Pixar film Cars, which was one of his final dubbing contributions. Despite being well known as a voice actor, he still did continue his career as a film and television actor.

== Death ==
In July 2006, Barbetti was involved in a car crash. This resulted in him suffering a severe brain injury and he died two months later just 16 days short of his 76th birthday.

== Filmography ==
=== Cinema ===
- The Three-Cornered Hat (1934)
- I'll Give a Million (1935)
- Eternal Melodies (1940)
- The Betrothed (1941)
- I Live as I Please (1942)
- The Countess of Castiglione (1942)
- Dagli Appennini alle Ande (1943)
- The White Angel (1943)
- The Legend of Faust (1949)
- The Great Waiver (1951)
- Messalina (1951)
- War and Peace (1956)
- The Assassination of Matteotti (1973)
- Malamore (1982)
- A School Outing (1983)
- Zeder (1983)
- Bank Clerks (1985)
- Graduation Party (1985)
- The Last Minute (1987)
- D'Annunzio (1987)
- Everybody's Fine (1990)

== Dubbing roles ==
=== Animation ===
- Doc Hudson in Cars
- John Lennon in Yellow Submarine
- Fnog in Futurama
- Narrator in The Swan Princess
- Torai in Hurricane Polymar
- Jeffrey Robbins in Gargoyles

=== Live action ===
- Jay Gatsby in The Great Gatsby
- Sundance Kid in Butch Cassidy and the Sundance Kid
- Roy Loomis in War Hunt
- Wade Lewis in Inside Daisy Clover
- Major Julian Cook in A Bridge Too Far
- Henry Brubaker in Brubaker
- Jack Weil in Havana
- Warren Justice in Up Close and Personal
- Hank Wilson in Situation Hopeless... But Not Serious
- Owen Legate in This Property Is Condemned
- Paul Bratter in Barefoot in the Park
- John Dortmunder in The Hot Rock
- Hubbell Gardiner in The Way We Were
- Johnny Hooker in The Sting
- Waldo Pepper in The Great Waldo Pepper
- Joseph Turner in Three Days of the Condor
- Bob Woodward in All the President's Men
- Sonny Steele in The Electric Horseman
- Roy Hobbs in The Natural
- Denys Finch Hatton in Out of Africa
- Tom Logan in Legal Eagles
- Martin Bishop / Martin Brice in Sneakers
- Old Norman Maclean in A River Runs Through It
- John Gage in Indecent Proposal
- Tom Booker in The Horse Whisperer
- Eugene Irwin in The Last Castle
- Nathan D. Muir in Spy Game
- Wayne Hayes in The Clearing
- Einar Gilkyson in An Unfinished Life
- Tom Hagen in The Godfather
- Tom Hagen in The Godfather Part II
- Norman Shrike in Let's Get Harry
- Captain in Thank You for Smoking
- Buck Weston in Kicking & Screaming
- Tom Spellacy in True Confessions
- Harry Hogge in Days of Thunder
- Al Sieber in Geronimo: An American Legend
- Bernie White in The Paper
- Wyly King in Something to Talk About
- Spurgeon "Fish" Tanner in Deep Impact
- Griffin Weir in The 6th Day
- Frank Grimes in John Q.
- John J. Anderson in Assassination Tango
- Dick Tracy in Dick Tracy
- Berry-Berry Willart in All Fall Down
- Joe Grady in The Only Game in Town
- Lyle Rogers in Ishtar
- Bugsy Siegel in Bugsy
- Mike Gambril in Love Affair
- Jay Billington Bulworth in Bulworth
- Fidel in Somebody Up There Likes Me
- Eric "The Kid" Stoner in The Cincinnati Kid
- Carter 'Doc' McCoy in The Getaway
- Bill Ringa in Never So Few
- Eustis Clay in Soldier in the Rain
- Max Sand in Nevada Smith
- Jake Holman in The Sand Pebbles
- Boon Hogganbeck in The Reivers
- Michael Delaney in Le Mans
- Henri Charrière in Papillon
- Thomas Stockmann in An Enemy of the People
- James T. Kirk in Star Trek IV: The Voyage Home
- James T. Kirk in Star Trek V: The Final Frontier
- James T. Kirk in Star Trek Generations
- Harrison Byers in Judgment at Nuremberg
- Aidan Carvell in Land of the Free
- Denny Crane in Boston Legal (seasons 1-2)
- Ken Hutch in Starsky & Hutch
- Jefferson Cope in Appointment with Death
- Joshua Bolt in Here Come the Brides
- Original Hutch in Starsky & Hutch
- Caractacus Potts in Chitty Chitty Bang Bang
- Edgar Hopper in What a Way to Go!
- Jack Albany in Never a Dull Moment
- Roger Cobb in All of Me
- C.D. Bales in Roxanne
- Freddy Benson in Dirty Rotten Scoundrels
- Newton Davis in Housesitter
- Jonas Nightengale in Leap of Faith
- Philip in Mixed Nuts
- Frank Sangster in Novocaine
- Steve Martin in Jiminy Glick in Lalawood
- Farnsworth "Dex" Dexter in Dynasty
- Walter Donovan in Indiana Jones and the Last Crusade
- Sir Leigh Teabing in The Da Vinci Code
- Raoul in Who Framed Roger Rabbit
- John Hammond in Jurassic Park
- John Hammond in The Lost World: Jurassic Park
- Otto West in A Fish Called Wanda
- Paden in Silverado
- Donald Woods in Cry Freedom
- Nick Starkey in The January Man
- Joey Boca in I Love You to Death
- Jeffrey Anderson in Soapdish
- Rod McCain / Vince McCain in Fierce Creatures
- Howard Brackett in In & Out
- Artemus Gordon / Ulysses S. Grant in Wild Wild West
- John Ryder in The Hitcher
- Nick Parker in Blind Fury
- Sallow in The Blood of Heroes
- Harley Stone in Split Second
- Omega Doom in Omega Doom
- Swan in Phantom of the Paradise
- Henry Hill in Goodfellas
- Paul "Bear" Briant in Forrest Gump
- William Vaughn in Michael Hayes
- Steve Walker in Blackbeard's Ghost
- Mark Garrison in The Ugly Dachshund
- Jim Douglas in The Love Bug
- Jim Douglas in Herbie Goes to Monte Carlo
- Albert Dooley in The Million Dollar Duck
- Wilby Daniels in The Shaggy D.A.
- Johnny Baxter in Snowball Express
- Zeke Kelso in That Darn Cat!
- Jake Rogers in The Chase
- Old James Ryan in Saving Private Ryan
- Art Silver in For the Boys
- Steven Kovacs' father in The Cable Guy
- Robert Ross in Who Is Killing the Great Chefs of Europe?
- Don Diego de la Vega in Zorro
- Michael Scott in That Lucky Touch
- Sebastian Oldsmith in Shout at the Devil
- Shawn Fynn in The Wild Geese
- Gavin Stewart in The Sea Wolves
- Lord Edgar Dobbs in The Quest
- Brett Sinclair in The Persuaders!
- Jim Phelps in Mission: Impossible
- Paul Serone in Anaconda
- Nate in Heat
- Blind Indian in U Turn
- Larry Zoolander in Zoolander
- Frederick Treves in The Elephant Man
- Adam Evans in A Change of Seasons
- William Bligh in The Bounty
- Abraham Van Helsing in Bram Stoker's Dracula
- J. J. "Jake" Gittes in Chinatown
- John Colby in Escape to Victory

== Bibliography ==
- Callisto Cosulich. I film di Alberto Lattuada. Gremese Editore, 1985.
