= Malamore =

1982 Italian melodrama film

- Directed by: Eriprando Visconti
- Written by: Roberto Gandus; Eriprando Visconti
- Produced by: Luciano De Feo
- Starring: Nathalie Nell; Jimmy Briscoe
- Cinematography: Luigi Kuveiller
- Edited by: Nino Baragli
- Music by: Aldo Salvi
- Release date: 1982
- Language: Italian

Malamore is a 1982 Italian melodrama film co-written and directed by Eriprando Visconti and starring Nathalie Nell and Jimmy Briscoe. It was Visconti's last film. It premiered at the 39th edition of the Venice International Film Festival in the De Sica section.

== Plot ==
Friuli, autumn of 1917. The dwarf Marcello Giammarco, the only son of a wealthy lawyer, is held by his father confined in a majestic country villa near Palmanova. The villa is located in the Italian rear of the front and has been partially converted into a military hospital. In this unreal atmosphere, between servants and dying, which precedes the defeat of Caporetto, the courteous and dignified Marcello tries to lead a normal existence, pursuing the sentimental dream of bonding with Maria, a prostitute of the local brothel. The death of his father, accidentally hit by an artillery shell during the capture of Palmanova, invests Marcello with responsibility for the great family heritage, while his villa, where he continues to live, becomes the seat of an Austrian rear command. Even the brothel changes customs and customers: now all Austrian soldiers. In those moments of extreme social and moral uncertainty, Marcello's rich patrimony becomes a possible target and a hope of revenge for some neglected, maneuvered by a shrewd profiteer, from whom the war seems to have taken away any future and any ethical sense.

== Cast ==
- Jimmy Briscoe as Marcello Giammarco
- Nathalie Nell as Maria
- Antonio Marsina as Cesare
- Remo Girone as The Monk
- Elisabeth Kaza as Leni Grundt
- Leopoldo Trieste as The Administrator
- Leonardo Treviglio as Amilcare
- David Brandon as Major Banfield (credited as David Aughton)
- Cesare Barbetti
- Monica Scattini as Sonia
- Serena Grandi as A Prostitute
- Cinzia Cavalieri as Alma
- Fiorella Molinari as Flora
- Maurizio Donadoni
- Ettore Geri

== Production ==
The film was mainly funded by the director Eriprando Visconti. The first choice for the Maria's role was Giuliana De Sio, but the distributors rejected the idea because at the time they considered De Sio just as a television actress. Edwige Fenech was also offered the role but refused.

== Reception ==
The film was both a critical and commercial failure.

== See also ==
- List of Italian films of 1982
