= The Three-Cornered Hat (film) =

1935 film

- Directed by: Mario Camerini
- Written by: Ercole Patti; Ivo Perilli; Mario Soldati
- Produced by: Giuseppe Amato
- Starring: Eduardo De Filippo; Peppino De Filippo
- Cinematography: Massimo Terzano
- Music by: Ernesto Tagliaferri; Nicola Valente
- Release date: 1935
- Language: Italian

The Three-Cornered Hat (Italian: Il cappello a tre punte, also spelled as Three Cornered Hat) is a 1935 Italian comedy film directed by Mario Camerini and starring Eduardo and Peppino De Filippo. It is a Naples-set adaptation of the Pedro Antonio de Alarcón's novella with the same name.

The film was shot at the Cines Studios in Rome.

== Plot ==
In the seventeenth century the Spanish governor of Naples harassed the population. Among the populace he notices a beautiful miller whom he falls in love with; to seduce her, she puts Luca, her husband, in jail, but he manages to escape and even disguises himself as a governor and penetrates the palace up to the governor's bedroom. Meanwhile, his wife Carmela manages to hold off the governor who has gone to the mill. The governor and Luca agree to punish the cheater who, when he returns home, is unable to be opened by the guards who treat him as an impostor.

== Cast ==
- Eduardo De Filippo as Don Teofilo, The Governor
- Peppino De Filippo as Luca
- Leda Gloria as Carmela
- Dina Perbellini as Donna Dolores
- Enrico Viarisio as Garduna
- Arturo Falconi as il capitano della guardia
- Giuseppe Pierozzi as Pasqualino, il mugnaio
- Cesare Zoppetti as Salvatore
- Gorella Gori as Concettina
- Mauro Serra as Carlone
- Tina Pica as Assunta
- Cesare Barbetti as Don Teofilo's Son
