= Twin Signal =

Japanese manga series

- Cover of Twin Signal, featuring (clockwise from top right) Signal, Chibi Signal, Nobuhiko, and Pulse.

ツインシグナル (Tsuin Sigunalu)
- Manga
- Written by: Sachi Oshimizu
- Published by: Enix
- Magazine: Monthly Shōnen Gangan; Monthly GFantasy
- Original run: December 1992 – December 2001
- Volumes: 19
- Original video animation

Twin Signal: Family Game
- Directed by: Takashi Sogabe
- Produced by: Michiyo Hayashi; Tomoyuki Igarashi
- Written by: Kuniaki Yamashita
- Music by: Suguru Suzuki
- Studio: Tokyo Kids
- Released: September 21, 1996 – November 21, 1996
- Runtime: 30 minutes each
- Episodes: 3

Twin Signal (ツインシグナル, Tsuin Sigunaru) is a manga series written by Sachi Oshimizu. It was later animated into a 3 episode anime OVA series in 1996. Both the manga and the OVA have been licensed by Media Blasters for distribution in the USA.

It follows the story of a humanoid created by a robotics expert named Dr. Otoi for his grandson, Nobuhiko. But in the process of writing and applying the programming, an unfortunate mishap took place when Nobuhiko sneezed. Now, whenever Nobuhiko sneezes, the humanoid (named Signal) transforms from a temperamental adult robot into a chocolate-loving baby version of himself.

Despite this, the days spent with the Otoi family are usually fun. Animals, people, and robots all live in harmony.

One day, Signal is attacked by Pulse, a robot created by Dr. Otoi some time ago as Signal's prototype. Pulse is incredibly nearsighted, but makes up for what he lacks in vision with firepower. Dr. Otoi's mysterious rival has packed him to the brim with amazing weaponry, with the intent of stealing the Doctor's most recent technology.

== Characters ==
Signal
Voiced by: Hiro Yuki (Japanese); David Thund (English)
The namesake of the series, Signal is the newest HFR (Human Form Robot) to be created by Professor Otoi. He is unique because of the MIRA and SIRIUS technology in him, which sometimes makes him a target of those wishing to steal his data. He is programmed to be a fighter and an older brother to Professor Otoi's grandson, Nobuhiko. Due to an accident in the lab during his creation, when Nobuhiko sneezes, it transforms Signal into a much smaller version of himself. He is referred to as 'Chibi Signal', is very hyper, and adores chocolate.
Nobuhiko Otoi
Voiced by: Rica Matsumoto (Japanese); Michelle Newman (English)
The grandson of Professor Otoi. Signal's 'little brother'. Because Nobu interrupted Signal's programming by sneezing, he ended up causing a glitch in MIRA. Every time Nobuhiko sneezes, Signal transforms into a 3-year-old chibi signal.
Professor Shinnosuke Otoi
Voiced by: Akio Otsuka (Japanese); Mike Pollock (English)
Nobuhiko's grandfather.
Mini Signal
Voiced by: Ikue Ohtani (Japanese); Michelle O'Medlin (English)
Chris Sine
Voiced by: Yuri Amano (Japanese); Lisa Ortiz (English)
The one and only super smart robot scientist" as she would say. She's somewhat loud and obnoxious but yet still a likeable character. However despite her claims of being such a genius and beautiful robot scientist, Kris is a bit of a flop. Her robots often end up failing, or going berserk, or just simply getting smashed by Signal. But she wishes to create a super robot more powerful and impressive than any other, despite her failures. She soon becomes the apprentice of Dr. Otoi and appears to be friends with Pulse.
Pulse
Voiced by: Takehito Koyasu (Japanese); Kevin Collins (English)
The prototype for Signal made by Otoi-sensei and Masanobu. Originally he was seen with silver hair and a grey styled outfit. He was a very kind and gentle robot but then one day Masanobu made some changes, upgrading him into a highly skilled combat robot. His look then changed to black long hair and dark clothes with two massive blades connected to his arms. It also appears that he conducts electricity through his hair and then charges that power through his eyes like a laser. These changes were not entirely for the best. Now he seems to be VERY nearsighted and if he should get too worn down he passes out. His laser also decreases energy. He has what appears to be robotic narcolepsy. He and Signal constantly fight and tease each other, but Pulse seems to have a soft spot for Chibi Signal and often talks with him. It also appears he was/is friends with Kris.
Elara (also Erala)
Voiced by: Yuri Shiratori (Japanese); Rachael Lillis (English)
A somewhat ditsy little robot that really can't cook and tends to find herself in a lot of trouble. Yet she is very caring and loving. She seems completely oblivious to Signal's love for her.
Masanobu Otoi
Voiced by: Issei Futamata (Japanese); Doung Bost (English)
Professor Otoi's son, and Nobuhiko's father. Masanobu is also a robot scientist. He views the HFR's as tools with the exception of his former brother-figure, Karma.
Minoru Otoi
Voiced by: Kumiko Nishihara (Japanese); Caroline Bose (English)
Nobuhiko's mother and Masanobu's wife. She is a scientist as well.
Officer Maki
Voiced by: Tomoyuki Morikawa (Japanese); Michael Tremain (English)
No. 3
Voiced by: Fumie Kusachi (Japanese); Rachael Lillis (English)
Flag
Voiced by: Masami Toyoshima (Japanese); Michelle O'Medlin (English)
Pulse's flying companion in the OVA.
Hoshimaro Umenokoji
Voiced by: Ikuo Nishikawa (Japanese); John Avner (English)
A Suke
Voiced by: Masaya Onosaka (Japanese); Jeff Ward (English)
B Suke
Voiced by: Kujira (Japanese); Jeff Ward (English)
Arano
Voiced by: ?? (Japanese); Abigale Gampell (English)
