= Dagli Appennini alle Ande (1959 film) =

- Directed by: Folco Quilici
- Release date: 1959
- Running time: 90 minute
- Country: Argentina
- Language: Spanish

Dagli Appennini alle Ande is a 1959 Italian-Argentine film directed by Folco Quilici. It is based on the short story of the same title from the novel Heart (Cuore) by Edmondo De Amicis.

== Cast ==
- Marco Paoletti as Marco Valesini
- Eleonora Rossi Drago as Marco's mother
- Fausto Tozzi as Marco's father
