= Dagli Appennini alle Ande (1943 film) =

1943 film

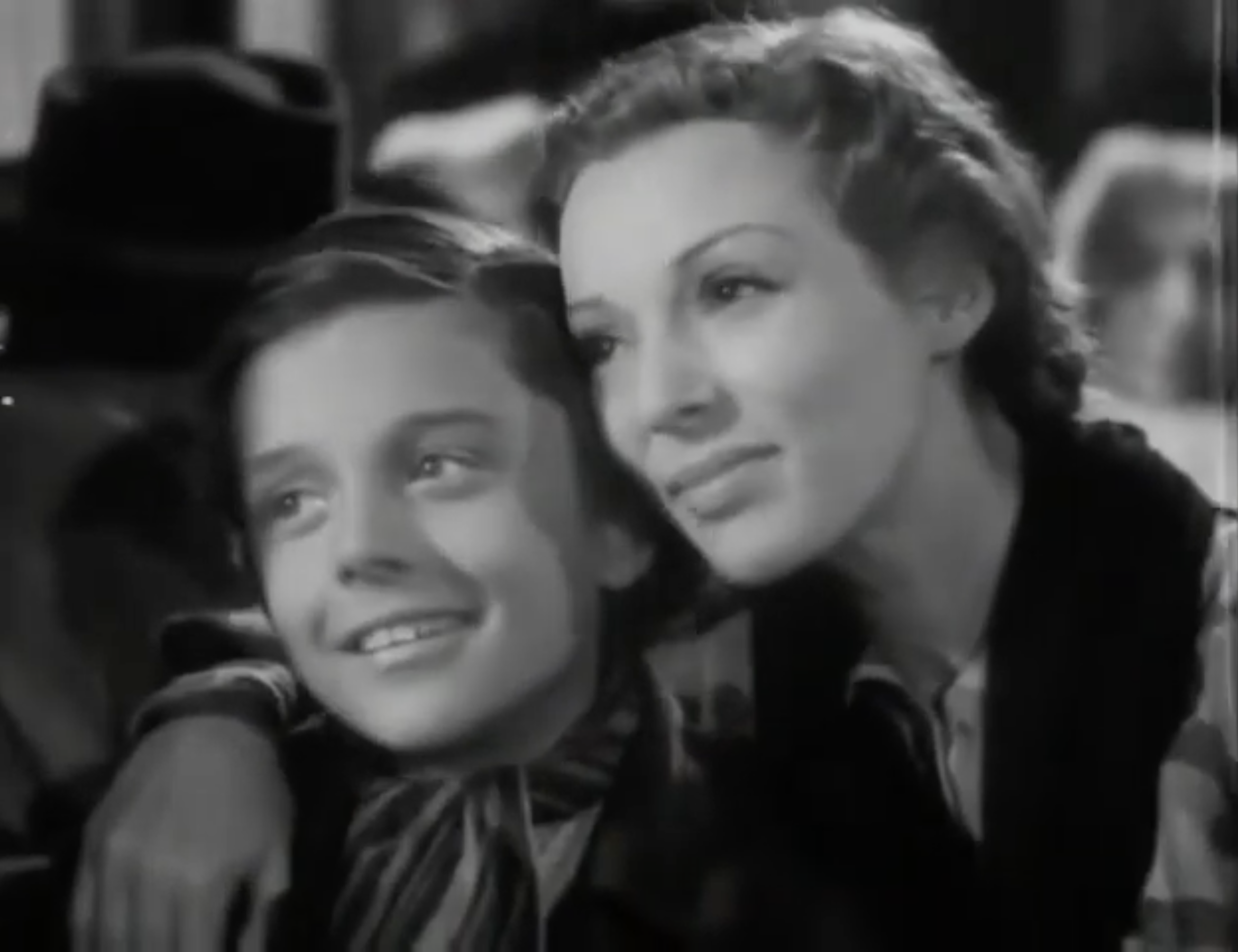
- Barbetti and Gloria in a film scene
- Directed by: Flavio Calzavara
- Screenplay by: Flavio Calzavara; Italo Cremona; Gian Paolo Callegari
- Based on: Heart by Edmondo De Amicis
- Produced by: Mario Borghi
- Starring: Cesare Barbetti; Leda Gloria
- Cinematography: Giovanni Vitrotti
- Edited by: Ignazio Ferronetti
- Music by: Franco Casavola
- Release date: 12 February 1943
- Running time: 85 minutes
- Country: Italy
- Language: Italian

Dagli Appennini alle Ande is a 1943 Italian drama film directed by Flavio Calzavara, starring Cesare Barbetti, Leda Gloria, Nino Pavese, Margherita Del Plata and Cesco Baseggio. It tells the story of the young boy Marco who secretly embarks from Genoa to reach his mother in Argentina. The film is based on the story with the same title from Edmondo De Amicis's book Heart. The story has been adapted for film multiple times both before and after.

The film was released in Italian cinemas on 12 February 1943.

== Cast ==
- Cesare Barbetti as Marco Ansaldi
- Leda Gloria as Maria Ansaldi, his mother
- Nino Pavese as Pegna
- Cesco Baseggio as The Old Madman
- Margherita Del Plata as The Dancer
- Nino Marchesini as The Ship's Commander
- Carlo Monteaux as Mr. Van Leiss
- Gina Cinquini as Mrs. Van Leiss
- Vira Silenti as The Little Girl
- Mario Siletti as Bendano, a peasant
- Pietro Tordi as Ulano, a peasant
- Giulio Battiferri as Sultano, a peasant
