= Katsumi Toriumi =

Japanese voice actor

- Born: November 6, 1963 (age 62)

Katsumi Toriumi (鳥海 勝美, Toriumi Katsumi; born November 6, 1963) is a Japanese voice actor from Saitama Prefecture. He works at Production Baobab. Toriumi performed with other voice actors on the album Everybody's Christmas.

== Voice roles ==
- Hazuki in Pokémon
- Dalida Lolaha Chandra II in Mobile Suit Gundam SEED
- Masato Wakamatsu in Miyuki
- Matsui in Kenichi: The Mightiest Disciple
- Byakuya Matou in Fate/Zero
- Wormhole in Stitch! ~The Mischievous Alien's Great Adventure~

=== Dubbing ===
==== Live-action ====
- Andromeda, Seamus Zelazny Harper (Gordon Michael Woolvett)
- Blow, Diego Delgado (Jordi Mollà)
- Can't Hardly Wait, William Lichter (Charlie Korsmo)
- E.T. the Extra-Terrestrial (1988 VHS edition), Michael Taylor (Robert MacNaughton)
- The Fast and the Furious (2005 TV Asahi edition), Jesse (Chad Lindberg)
- Gulliver's Travels, Hank (Romany Malco)
- The Longest Yard, James "Caretaker" Farrell (Chris Rock)
- The Man in the Iron Mask, Raoul (Peter Sarsgaard)
- The Program, Lance Armstrong (Ben Foster)
- Swing Kids, Arvid (Frank Whaley)
- White Squall, Chuck Gieg (Scott Wolf)

==== Animation ====
- Mr. Bogus, Bogus and Additional Voices
- Wreck-It Ralph, Roy
