= Zoids Saga =

- Game Logo
- Developer: Amedio
- Publisher: TOMY
- Series: Zoids
- Platform: Game Boy Advance
- Release: JP: November 30, 2001
- Genre: Role-playing game
- Mode: Single-player

Zoids Saga is a series of Game Boy Advance (and later Nintendo DS) games based on the Zoids franchise, primarily released in Japan. The series encompasses four games and one international adaptation; Zoids Saga, Zoids Saga II (released as Zoids: Legacy in several English-speaking nations), Zoids Saga III: Fuzors, and Zoids Saga DS

The games are closely linked to the Zoids anime series. Because of the difference in time between these anime in the Zoids fictional universe, the games rely heavily on time travel.

== Gameplay ==
The games of the Zoids Saga series are party-based role-playing games, and involve the player character leading a team of Zoid pilots. The party moves around the overworld and through the dungeons, fighting off wild Zoids and enemy pilots as the player attempts to complete the game. The player is responsible for constructing the various Zoids available from captured technical data, assigning the pilots in his party to the Zoids, and organising them in a battle formation.

Combat is turn-based, and occurs on two opposing two by three grids, one for the player, the other for the enemy. Six of the player's Zoids (previously organized into the two by three battle formation) are deployed, and the player must use a combination of the Zoids' weapons, pilot skills, and special orders (deck commands) to defeat the enemy.

== Zoids Saga ==
The first in the series, Zoids Saga is set at a point between Chaotic Century and New Century Zero, and follows Prince 'Atory' of the Arcadia Kingdom. Atory is forced to flee his home after it is attacked by a man known only as the Emperor. It is revealed early on in the game that the Emperor is after the 'Time-Space Transmission' technology recently discovered by Arcadian scientists; wanting to use it to travel back in time and conquer Zi. Most of the game is spent travelling back and forward in time to stop the Emperor's henchmen from altering history.

The party (Atory and his three bodyguards to begin with) travel in time on several occasions in pursuit of the Emperor's four henchmen, appearing at three points during the Zoids: Chaotic Century series, twice during Zoids: Guardian Force, once during Zoids: New Century Zero, and once during the era of the Silver Liger Zero Game Boy game.

== Zoids Saga II ==
In Zoids Saga II, the world of Zi is warped by an accident involving the Time-Space Transmission unit, merging the timelines so that the first three anime, Zoids VS, Liger Silver Beast, and the events directly after the first Zoids Saga game are all occurring simultaneously. The game follows 'Zeru' and Juno as they attempt to foil the efforts of the Backdraft Group and the Terra Geist organization, along with restoring the timelines to their original states.

Several improvements to the gameplay were made in Zoids Saga II. Enemy groups of Zoids were no longer visible on the overworld or dungeon maps, such battles becoming random encounters, and movement on the overworld and in the dungeons was upgraded to 8 directions.

=== Zoids: Legacy ===
Zoids Saga II was released in several English-speaking nations, under the title of Zoids: Legacy. There were no changes to the gameplay, but the entire game was translated from Japanese to English. This translation is mostly inaccurate, incorrect most of the time and nonsensical at others, with numerous spelling and grammar errors. It is cited as one of the major problems of the English-language release.

For example, while many of the characters use their Western names, there are several such as Ballad (Brad Hunter) and Jimmy (Jamie) that use simple romanizations of their Japanese names. Likewise, the Zoids are inconsistently named with some American names (Zaber Fang for the Sabre Tiger and Berserk Fury for Berserk Führer) and some Japanese ones (like Wardick and Stealth Viper). Finally, and rather inexplicably, the Marder was referred to as Hellrunner, its OER name.

== Zoids Saga III: Fuzors ==
Zoids Saga III: Fuzors (sometimes just 'Zoids Saga III' or 'Zoids Saga: Fuzors'), is set in the Zoids: Fuzors fictional world, and follows the actions of 'Will'. A good portion of the storyline parallels the Zoids: Fuzors anime. Similar to Zoids Saga there is one city (Blue City) which the player returns to after each segment of the story.

One of the major changes made to the game was the way Unizon Zoids were formed. When Unizon Zoids were introduced in Zoids Saga II the player had to have all of the Unizon Zoids in a certain formation and use a deck command to fuse them. Each Unizon Zoid was fused for the entire battle and only got one attack per turn cycle. In Zoids Saga III you could fuse during your turn in battle. Each Unizon Zoid would be fused for four turn cycles and would get the same number of turns per cycle as the number of Zoids fused. After four turns the Unizon Zoid would break apart into its original Zoids and could be re-fused from there. An example is the Matrix Dragon (which is a Unizon of 4 separate Zoids) would get four turns in Zoids Fuzors and split apart after four turn cycles in Zoids Saga III while in Zoids Saga II it would get one turn and stay fused the entire battle. This made a small number of boss battles significantly easier as the player would only have to survive four turn cycles and then attack the weaker individual Zoids after the Unizon broke apart.

Another addition was the ability for certain Zoids to have flying modes and land modes. For example Liger Zero Phoenix (before any modification) would have more powerful weapons while in land mode, but would be slower and less evasive. While in flying mode its weapons would be weaker but it would be faster and more evasive.

A major change was the way you could modify your Zoid's armorments. You could make your weapons infinitely powerful in theory, but as the power of a weapon rose, so did the amount of EP (Energy Points) it cost to use it. There was a maximum on the amount of EP your Zoid could have. This added to the games strategy, because rather than needing to buy a new Zoid when the enemies became too strong, you could modify your current Zoid's weapons to meet the challenge.

== Zoids Saga DS: Legend of Arcadia ==
A game which combines the stories of the previous three games, cutting some sections and expanding others. As might be expected, it features improvements in graphics and sound. In addition, it includes characters, Zoids and story elements from the Zoids Genesis anime. This game was not released outside Japan; however, a fan translation is available.
