= Folco Quilici =

Italian film director

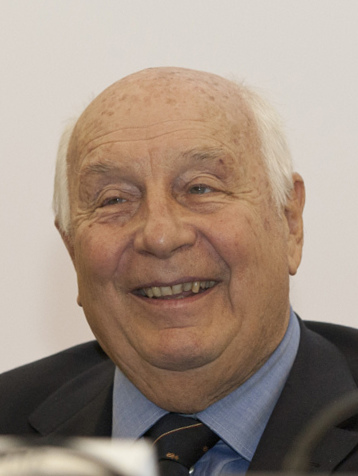
- Born: 9 April 1930; Ferrara, Italy
- Died: 24 February 2018 (aged 87); Orvieto, Italy
- Occupations: Film director, screenwriter
- Years active: 1952–2005

Folco Quilici (9 April 1930 – 24 February 2018) was an Italian film director and screenwriter. He directed a total of 22 films between 1952 and his retirement in 2005, including Tiko and the Shark (it). His 1955 film L'ultimo paradiso won the Silver Bear in the documentary category at the 7th Berlin International Film Festival.

== Biography ==
Son of journalist Nello Quilici and painter Mimì Quilici Buzzacchi, he was born in the beautiful city Ferrara on 9 April 1930. His father Nello, who was a famous journalist, tragically died during the war in what has been remembered as the incident of Tobruch, a fatal plane crush above Libia. The airplane on which the journalist was traveling along with Italo Balbo, Lino Balbo, and other collaborators of the governor was shot down in the skies of Tobruk by the anti-aircraft fire from the Italian cruiser San Giorgio. All the passengers perished. An hypothesis, never confirmed but widespread, suggests that the downing was not accidental but rather deliberate, a homicide caused by the disagreements between Balbo and Mussolini. Quilici left a testimony of his brief experience in Libya in the War Diary kept from June 12 to June 21, 1940.

After the war he moved with his mother and his brother Vieri in via Sicilia in Rome where they lived with his aunt. There he studied at the "Torquato Tasso" high school, and soon after he embarked on a career in amateur filmmaking and specialized in underwater filming, becoming very popular also beyond national borders. He studied directing at the Experimental Cinematography Center.

He was registered as a journalist with the National Order of Journalists on February 19, 1963, and for this he was awarded by the same Order in 2013 for his 50 years of journalistic activity.

In 2006, Forbes magazine included him among the one hundred most influential figures in the world thanks to his films and books on the environment and cultures.

In 2008, he was awarded the "La Navicella d'Oro" Prize, conferred by the Italian Geographic Society, with the following motivation:

"Over more than half a century of constant professional activity, he has configured a personal model of a traveler capable of exploring and testifying with persuasive rigor and poetics the most relevant territories of geographical, historical, and artistic culture of human society past and present, achieving stylistic and expressive results of considerable value and broad communicative relevance."

== Cinema ==
His films dedicated to the relationship between man and the sea were distributed worldwide. Among them, the following received significant recognition: "Sesto continente" (Special Prize at the Venice Film Festival in 1954), "Ultimo paradiso" (Silver Bear at the Berlin Festival in 1956), "Tikoyo e il suo pescecane" (UNESCO Culture Prize in 1961), "Oceano" (Special Prize at the Taormina Film Festival in 1971 and David di Donatello in 1972), "Fratello mare" (First Prize at the International Marine Film Festival, Cartagena, 1974), and "Cacciatori di navi" in 1991 (Umbria Fiction Prize, 1992).

In 1965, Esso entrusted him with the production of a series of films about Italy shot from above using a helicopter: from 1966 to 1978, 14 such documentaries were made, all titled "L'Italia vista dal cielo"; sixteen illustrated volumes accompanied these films. The commentary for the fourteen films was entrusted to important writers and art historians of the time such as Leonardo Sciascia, Giovanni Comisso, Cesare Brandi, Mario Praz, Italo Calvino, Guido Piovene, Michele Prisco, Ignazio Silone, and Mario Soldati.

Other acclaimed films of his, both in cinemas and not only in Italy, include: "Dagli Appennini alle Ande" (1959), which won the "Concha de plata" at the San Sebastian International Festival; "Il dio sotto la pelle" in 1974. Among his mid-length films of particular commitment, some were presented out of competition at the Venice Film Festival: "Paul Gauguin" (1957) and "L'angelo e la sirena" (1980). In 1964, he removed his name from the film "Le schiave esistono ancora" due to disagreements with the producer Maleno Malenotti, not only because of the arbitrarily chosen title but also due to the inclusion of numerous false scenes in the film.

In 1976, called upon by Dino De Laurentiis, he collaborated in the underwater filming for Michael Anderson's film "Orca: The Killer Whale"; the screenplay was written by Luciano Vincenzoni, who often recalled Quilici's contribution as crucial to the success of the filming.

Also noteworthy is "Botticelli, una nuova primavera" (1982). In 1970, he produced "Firenze 1000 giorni," about the 1967 flood and the efforts to save its cultural heritage. Folco Quilici was nominated for an Academy Awards in 1971 for "Toscana," one of the fourteen films from "L'Italia vista dal cielo." In 2000, for the Franco-German television network Arte, he produced and directed the feature films "Kolossal" (1999/2000) and "Il mondo di Pinocchio" (2002). In 2004, for the Luce Institute, he directed the feature film "L'impero di marmo" (awarded at the Agon International Archaeological Film Festival, Greece, in 2006) and the documentary film "L'ultimo volo" (Acqui Storia Prize 2010). Later, he directed "Lazio – Paesaggio e storia" (Bellezze d'Italia Prize 2012).

== Career ==
From 1954, he published numerous works of non-fiction in Italy and abroad: "Mala Kebir" (1955), "Mille fuochi" (1964), "Sesto continente" (1965), "Gli ultimi primitivi" (1972), "I grandi deserti" (1972), "Magia" (1977), "Le frontiere di Allah" (1978), "Natura chiama uomo" (1979), "Il riflesso dell'Islam" (1983), "L'uomo europeo" (1983), "India" (1990), "I mari del sud" (1991), "Il mio Mediterraneo" (1992), "La mia Africa" (1992), "Le Americhe" (1993), "Il mio Mar Rosso" (1998), "Tobruk 1940" (2004), "I miei mari" (2006). Between 1976 and 1979, he directed "La grande enciclopedia del mare." In 1974/1975, he co-authored "La Mediterranéé" with Fernand Braudel. With his wife Anna, he authored two biographies: "Amundsen" (1998) and "Jack London" (2000), which won the Chianciano Prize and the Castiglioncello Prize.

Starting from 2002, he collaborated on a series of illustrated volumes, with Luca Tamagnini (published by Phoatlante), dedicated to the protected areas of the Italian seas.

He ventured into fiction with "Cacciatori di navi" (1985), translated in the United States, "Cielo verde" (1997), a novel long present in the bestseller list in Italy, and in 1998 with "Naufraghi." In 1999, with the novel "Alta profondità," he began the cycle composed of "L'abisso di Hatutu" (2001), "Mare Rosso" (2002), "I serpenti di Melqart" (2003), "La fenice del Bajkal" (2005). In 2008, he published the novel "Libeccio" and in 2012 "La dogana del vento."

In 2011 and 2012, he wrote two books for children's literature: "Storie del mare" and "Amico oceano."

Quilici collaborated with Italian and international press since 1954, for newspapers such as Life, Epoca, Panorama, Europeo, and for dailies such as La Stampa and Corriere della Sera. His journalistic commitment saw him working for Il Messaggero on naturalistic themes. In 1994, he won the "Penna d'oro" for his services on Latin America. In 1997, he was awarded the "Premio Campidoglio per la carriera nel giornalismo culturale."

In 1983, President Sandro Pertini awarded him the "Medaglia d'oro" for cultural merits.

He taught courses at the University of Bologna (1966/1967), at the University of Berlin (1991), at the Experimental Cinematography Center (1995), at the Catholic University of Milan (1998), at the Third University of Rome (2001/2002), at the University of Padua (2004/2005). From 1985 to 1989, he taught at ORAO (Centro dell'Immagine Culturale), in courses resumed in 1997 and continued in 1998.

From February 2003 to June 2006, he was president of ICRAM, Central Institute for Scientific and Technological Research Applied to the Sea, and directed the Institute's "Quaderni scientifici." Previously, from 1995 to 1996, he was the director of the monthly "Mondo Sommerso."

He was among the founding members of H.D.S. (Historical Diving Society Italia) and the environmental association Marevivo.

== Death ==
Quilici died in Orvieto, Italy of a stroke on 24 February 2018 at the age of 87.
