= Rumiko Ukai =

Japanese voice actress

Ukai Rumiko 鵜飼 るみ子
- Born: Fukuoka Prefecture
- Occupation: Voice actress
- Years active: 1975–present
- Notable credits: Mobile Suit Gundam as Frau Bow; Space Runaway Ideon as Kitty Kitten; Brigadoon: Marin & Melan as Miyuki Tokita; Urusei Yatsura as Pepper

Rumiko Ukai (鵜飼 るみ子, Ukai Rumiko) is a Japanese voice actress best known for voicing Frau Bow in the original Mobile Suit Gundam. She is a member of 81 Produce.

== Filmography ==
- The Babysitter in Stitch! ~Best Friends Forever~ (2010)
- Pepper in Urusei Yatsura (xxxx)
- Miyuki Tokita in Brigadoon: Marin & Melan (xxxx)
- Shihoko Kishida in Darker than Black (xxxx)
- Akiko Yanagi in Sailor Moon (1992)
- Izumi Sano in Detective Conan (xxxx)
- Frau Bow in Mobile Suit Gundam (1979)
- Kitty Kitten in Space Runaway Ideon (1980)
- Princess Fala (Allura) in Golion (1981)
- Rose in Six God Combination Godmars (1981)
- Tetsuo in Miss Machiko (1981)
- Ester in Tales of Little Women (1987)
- Yoneta-sensei in Fair, then Partly Piggy (1988)
- Darusa in Chimpui (1989)

=== Dubbing ===
- Coming to America, Lisa McDowell (Shari Headley)
- The Dark Knight, Barbara Gordon (Melinda McGraw)
