= 1967 in Italian television =

This is a list of Italian television related events from 1967.

== Events ==
- January 1: the first episode of Sandro Bolchi’s I promessi sposi (see below) is aired.
- January 6: Claudio Villa wins Scala reale (the 1966 edition of Canzonissima) with Granada; Gianni Morandi is runner-up with La fisarmonica. During the final evening of the show, Morandi learns of the death of his newborn daughter Serena.
- January 15: cable TV Tele Torino 1 begins broadcasting; it transmits advertisements and sports and music programs on 50 televisions located in the Turin Porta Nuova railway station. The new television works only one day, before being blocked by bureaucratic problems.
- 27 January The young singer-songwriter Luigi Tenco, upset for the failure of his song Ciao, amore, ciao at the Sanremo festival, shoots himself in his hotel room. He leaves behind an accusatory message against the record industry and the mechanism of the contest. RAI tries to minimize the tragedy.; the final evening of the show goes on air on schedule, getting 21, million viewers (record of the year). The host Mike Bongiorno only briefly mentions the suicide, not even telling Tenco's name. The festival is won by Claudio Villa, exponent of the most traditional melodic song, and Iva Zanicchi, with Non pensare a me.
- 2 February: on the proposal of socialist Luigi Anderlini and republican Ugo La Malfa, the parliament postpones at least until 1971 the adoption of color TV, considered "an opulent and unnecessary consumption". Despite this stance, shared by much of the Italian political world, RAI continues experiments with color.
- June 6: Arrigo Levi is the first journalist to host the news program (previously, the news were read by a speaker).
- June 25: on the televisions of the five continents, Our world, the first multi-satellite television production, is aired. RAI contributes with two reports on the brothers Raimondo and Piero D'Inzeo and on the filming of Franco Zeffirelli’s Romeo and Juliet.
- 31 August: Rocky Roberts wins Festivalbar with Stasera mi butto. For the first time, television broadcasts the event (also if three weeks deferred).

== Debuts ==
=== Drama ===
- Di fronte alla legge (Facing the law) – cycle of courtroom-dramas about social questions, care of Diego Fabbri.

=== Serials ===
- Il triangolo rosso (The warning triangle) – by Mario Maffei and others, with Jacques Sernas, Riccardo Garrone and Elio Pandolfi, as three Polizia Stradale agents; 2 seasons.

=== Variety ===
- Ieri e oggi – variety hosted by Lelio Luttazzi and others; 9 seasons, more three spin-off and a reprisal of 2 seasons, hosted by Carlo Conti, in 2018-2019. The guests in studio (singers or actors) reviews and comments their old performances from the RAI archives.

=== News and educational ===
- Sapere (To know) - popular science program, ideated by Giovan Battista Zorzoli; 9 seasons.
- Prossimamente (Soon) – promotional column about the RAI shows of the upcoming week; lasted till 1984.
- Tuttiilibri – books magazine, care of Giulio Nascimbeni and others; it was the longest-lived RAI cultural program, lasted till 1987.

== Shows of the year ==
=== Drama and comedy ===
- Tutto Totò – by Daniele D’Anza with Totò; cycle of 9 comic TV-movie, unfinished because the death of the actor. The series, realized hastily, gets a good public success but deludes the critics and the fans of Totò, who here appears underused and far from his best shape.
- La cotta (The crush) – by Ermanno Olmi, with no-professional actors; love story between two teen-agers.
- La madre di Torino (Turin’s mother) – experimental docudrama by Gianni Bongioanni, with Lucia Catullo; inspired by a true story (the rescue of a child clinging to a balcony in Turin).
- Il novelliere – by Daniele D’Anza; second cycle of tv plays, after the 1960 one, from the tales by other six great writers (Alberto Moravia, Guy de Maupassant, Giovanni Verga, Cesare Pavese, Somerset Maugham, Karel Capek).
- Lo schiaccianoci – C’era una volta (The nutcracker – Once upon a time) by Vito Molinari, musical comedy from the Pyotr Ilyich Tchaikovsky's ballet; with Carla Fracci, Giorgio Albertazzi and Renato Rascel.
- Delirio a due (Duplex delirium) – by Vittorio Cottafavi, from Eugene Ionesco’s Délire à deux, with Renato Rascel and Fulvia Mammi. A couple is so intent on arguing that they do not notice that war has broken out.
- L’ospite segreto (The secret sharer) by Eriprando Visconti, from Joseph Conrad’s novel, with Nino Castelnuovo and Giulio Brogi.
- The Persians by Aeschylus, from the Teatro Olimpico in Vicenza, directed by Dimitrios Rondiris, with Elena Zareschi, Giulio Brogi and Tino Carraro.

==== Historical drama ====
- Il complotto di luglio, by Vittorio Cottafavi, from The july plot by Roger Manvell, with Paolo Graziosi and Tino Carraro.
- Il processo di Santa Teresa del Bambino Gesù (Therese of Lisieux’s canonization) – by Vittorio Cottafavi, with Franco Graziosi and Evi Maltagliati. The life of the saint is reconstructed by the testimonies of five of her sisters.
- La sconfitta di Trotsky (Leon Trotsky’s defeat) – docudrama by Marco Leto, with Franco Parenti and Valeria Valeri.
- France- The Taking of Power by Louis XIV by Roberto Rossellini

=== Miniseries ===
- Breve gloria di mister Miffin (Mr. Miffin’s Brief Glory) – by Anton Giulio Majano, from The one-eyed monster by Allan Prior, with Cesco Baseggio and Alberto Lupo; 4 episodes. One of the first Italian fictions about sociological questions, it tells the story of an old wise man, whose life is destroyed when he becomes a TV star.
- Questi nostri figli (Those our sons) – by Mario Landi, from a Francois Mauriac’s script adapted by Diego Fabbri, with Andrea Lala, Mila Vannucci and Lino Capolicchio, 4 episodes. The themes of the French writer (the gap between the generations and between Catholics and freethinkers) are transposed into contemporary Bologna.

==== Period drama ====
- Abramo Lincoln: cronaca di un delitto (Chronicle of a crime) by Daniele D’Anza, with Antonio Crast (Lincoln), Sergio Graziani (Booth) and Massimo Girotti (teller); 4 episodes.
- Caravaggio, by Silverio Blasi, with Gian Maria Volonté in the title role, Carla Gravina and Renzo Palmer; in 3 episodes.
- I promessi sposi, by Sandro Bolchi, from Alessandro Manzoni's novel The Betrothed, script by Riccardo Bacchelli, with two young actors coming from the new-wave cinema (Nino Castelnuovo and Paola Pitagora) as the two protagonists and a stellar cast in the minor roles (Tino Carraro, Luigi Vannucchi, Massimo Girotti, Lea Massari, Salvo Randone and Giancarlo Sbragia as the teller); in 8 episodes. Scrupulously faithful to the original text, it is one of the Italian TV-novels most ambitious and most appreciated by public and critics.
- La fiera delle vanità – by Anton Giulio Majano, from William Makepeace Thackeray's novel Vanity Fair, with Adriana Asti and Ilaria Occhini; in 7 episodes.
- Vita di Cavour (Life of Cavour) – by Piero Schivazappa, with Renzo Palmer, script by Giorgio Prosperi; in 4 episodes.
- Dossier Mata Hari – biopic by Mario Landi, with Cosetta Greco in the title role and Gabriele Ferzetti; 4 episodes.

=== Serials ===
- Sheridan, squadra omicidi (Sheridan homicide squad) by Leonardo Cortese, with Ubaldo Lay as the Lieutenant Sheridan of the San Francisco Police Department.
- I racconti del faro (The lighthouse’s tales) – by Angelo D’Alessandro, with Fosco Giachetti and Roberto Chevalier; sea adventures in 6 episodes, for children.

=== Variety ===
- Partitissima - 1967 edition of Canzonissima, hosted by Alberto Lupo, won by Dalida with Dan dan dan.
- Il tappabuchi (The stopgaps) – by Vito Molinari, with Corrado Mantoni and Raimondo Vianello, in 8 episodes; mix of comic sketches, dance, quiz and candid cameras realized by Nanny Loy.
- Sabato sera (Saturday evening) – by Antonello Falqui, hosted by Mina, with Rocky Roberts, Lola Falana and Franca Valeri as constant guests.
- Musica da sera (Evening music) – by Enzo Trapani, with Lisa Gastoni and Mascia Cantoni.
- Diamoci del tu (Don't be formal) – by Romolo Siena, musical show aimed to the young ones, hosted by Caterina Caselli and Giorgio Gaber; debut in TV of Francesco Guccini and Franco Battiato.
- Chi ti ha dato la patente? (Who gave you the driving license?) – quiz aimed to make know the rules of the road, hosted by Mascia Cantoni, with Ric e Gian as regular guests. It’s the first Italian TV show with a female presenter.
- Eccetera, eccetera - by Vito Molinari, hosted by Gino Bramieri, Marisa Del Frate and Pippo Baudo.
- Lei non si preoccupi (Don't worry) - hosted by Isabella Biagini and Enrico Simonetti.
- Scarpette rosa (Pink shoes) – tribute show to Carla Fracci, in form of an enquiry by a female reporter (Lina Volonghi).
- Stasera in casa (Tonite at ...’s house)- show from the houses of actors as Tomas Millian and Sandra Milo.

=== News and educational ===
- La via del petrolio (The way of the petroleum) - by Bernardo Bertolucci, produced by ENI; 3 episodes.
- Giovani – magazine aimed to the younger audience, care of Andrea Barbato.
- Antoni Gaudì, la divina architettura by Giuliano Betti.

== Deaths ==
- April 15: Totò, comic actor (69).
- November 1: Enrico Viarisio, actor (69)
