= 1969 in Italian television =

This is a list of Italian television related events from 1969.

== Events ==
- January 6: Gianni Morandi wins Canzonissima with Scende la pioggia (The rain falls), cover of Elenore.
- January 30 - February 1: Sanremo Festival, hosted by Nuccio Costa and Gabriella Farinon and won by Bobby Solo and Iva Zanicchi with Zingara. This the only time that Lucio Battisti takes part in the contest, with Un’avventura. The final evening is the most seen show of the year, with 22,4 million viewiers.
- April 13: the Catholic jurist Aldo Sandulli, former president of the Constitutional Court, is nominated RAI president.
- July 20–21. For the Apollo 11 mission, RAI airs a live show lasting 27 hours. It involved more than 200 technicians and journalists, and included the presence of more than 500 guests (scientists, sportsmen and intellectuals, such as Michelangelo Antonioni and Alfonso Gatto). At 22:17 (Italian hour) the anchorman Tito Stagno announces the Moon landing with a minute in advance. He is corrected by the correspondent Ruggero Orlando, who follows the event from Houston Space center. The subsequent quarrel between the two journalists overshadows, for the Italian public, Neil Armstrong’s historical announcement: “The eagle is landed.” Despite this incident, the “night of the moon” is for RAI a professional achievement and a huge public success (20 million viewers).
- October 25: Enzo Tortora, very popular host of The sporting Sunday, in an interview with the weekly Oggi announces his intention to leave RAI and argues with the company's executives, defined as "boy scouts driving a jet and playing with the keyboard"; RAI responds by not renewing its contract. In the following years, Tortora worked for RSI and for the emerging private TV channels.
- December 12: an extraordinary edition of the TG1 announces to the country the Piazza Fontana bombing; the same evening, the Prime Minister Mariano Rumor, in a TV message to the nation, condemns indignantly the slaughter and promises justice. On December 15, RAI broadcasts live the burial of the victims.
- December 16: in the evening news, the young journalist Bruno Vespa, live from the Milan police headquarters, announces: “Pietro Valpreda is one of the guilty for the slaughter in Milan and for the attacks in Rome”. Valpreda was a dancer and leader of a small anarchist group, which was verbally extremist but fully unrelated to the crime. Valpreda is subsequently depicted by television and by most of the press as a monster. The TV show Stasera Gina Lollobrigida is deleted because he appears for a few seconds as an extra. Only Indro Montanelli, interviewed by Sergio Zavoli, declares that he does not believe that the anarchists were guilty.

== Debuts ==
=== Serials ===
- Nero Wolfe – by Giuliana Belrlinguer, with Tino Buazzelli in the title role and Paolo Ferrari as Archie Goodwin; 3 seasons. The series gets a huge public and critic success, with also 20 million viewers for episode; the same author Rex Stout declares to prefer it to the American versions of his character.
- I racconti italiani – cycle of TV-movie by various directors from tales of Italian contemporary writers; a second series Is realized in 1973.

=== Variety ===
- Speciale per voi (Special for you) – directed by Carla Ragionieri and Romolo Siena, with Renzo Arbore (at his TV debut); two seasons. The show is one of the first aimed explicitly to the young public and reflects, indirectly, the protests of 1968; in every episode, a guest singer faces an audience of teen-agers, often polemic and impertinent.
- Doppia coppia (Double couple) - variety hosted by Alighiero Noschese and Bice Valori, playing the RAI receptionist; 2 seasons. For the first time, Noschese is allowed to impersonate on video the politicians.

=== News and educational ===
- AZ: un fatto come e perchè (AZ: a fact, how and why) – news magazine, hosted by Emilio Mastrostefano; 7 seasons.

== Television shows ==
=== Drama ===
- La polizia (The police) – by Dante Guardamagna, from the Slawomir Mrozek’s play, with Roldano Lupi, Arnoldo Foà, Renzo Montagnani.
- Rebecca – by Eros Macchi, from the Daphne du Maurier’s novel, with Amedeo Nazzari and Ileana Ghione.
- Look back in anger by John Osborne, directed by Mario Missiroli, with Giulio Brogi, Anna Maria Guarnieri and Ilaria Occhini.
- The front page by Ben Hecht and Charles Mac Arthur, directed by Anton Giulio Majano, with Ugo Pagliai and Carlo Alighiero.
- Arsenic and old lace – by Joseph Kesselring, directed by Davide Montemurri, with Nando Gazzolo, Elsa Melrini and Lina Volognhi.
- I burosauri – satirical play by Silvano Ambrogi, directed by Lidia C. Ripandelli, with Ernesto Calindri.
- Bertoldo, Bertoldino e Cacasenno by Pier Benedetto Bertoli, from the Giulio Cesare Croce’s novel, directed by Vincenzo Baldi, with Umberto D’Orsi and Sandra Mondaini; the family of a peasant, rough but good-sensed, is compared with a refined Renaissance court.

==== Historical dramas ====
- Olivier Cromwell, ritratto di un dittatore (Portrait of a dictator) – by Vittorio Cottafavi, with Sergio Fantoni in the title role and Giancarlo Sbragia as King Charles I.
- Eleonora Duse – by Flaminio Bollini, with Lilla Brignone in the title role and Giancarlo Sbragia as Gabriele D’Annunzio; in 2 episodes.
- La resa dei conti (The showdown) – by Marco Leto, reconstruction of the events from the fall of the fascist regime to the Verona trial; with Ivo Garrani (Mussolini) and Franco Graziosi (Ciano), 2 episodes.

=== Miniseries ===
- Atti degli Apostoli (Acts of the Apostles) – by Roberto Rossellini, international coproduction in five episodes.
- Jekyll – from Robert Louis Stevenson’s Strange case of Doctor Jekyll and Mister Hyde - directed by Giorgio Albertazzi, with the same Albertazzi as the protagonist and Massimo Girotti as Utterson; in 4 episodes. The plot is faithful to the Stevenson’s one, also if the story is transferred in the swinging London.
- I fratelli Karamazov (The Brothers Karamazov) – by Sandro Bolchi, from the Fyodor Dostoevskij’s novel, script by Diego Fabbri, with Corrado Pani, Umberto Orsini, Carla Gravina and Lea Massari; in 7 episodes. Two years after I promessi sposi, Bolchi gets another huge success both by public (15 million viewers) and by critics.
- Il segreto di Luca (Luca’s secret) – by Ottavio Spadaro, from Ignazio Silone’s novel, with Turi Ferro, Riccardo Cucciolla and Lydia Alfonsi; 4 episodes. A simple countryman, to save the honor of his beloved, chooses to be sentenced to life imprisonment for a crime he never committed.
- La fine dell’avventura (The end of the affair) – by Gianfranco Bettetini, from the Graham Greene’s novel, with Raoul Grassilli, Mila Vannucci and Tino Carraro; 3 episodes.

==== Mystery ====
- La donna di cuori (The queen of hearts) – by Leonardo Cortese, with Ubaldo Lay (as Lieutenant Sheridan), Emma Danieli, Sandra Mondaini (in her only dramatic role) and Amedeo Nazzari; 5 episodes. In this new chapter of the “Sheridan’s queens” series, the detective is, for the first time, in love and personally involved in the enquiry.
- Giocando a golf una mattina (Playing golf in the morning) – mystery by Daniele D’Anza, from Francis Durbridge’s A game of murder, with Luigi Vannucchi and Aroldo Tieri; 6 episodes.
- Geminus – detective comedy by Luciano Emmer, with Walter Chiari, Alida Chelli and Giampiero Albertini; 6 episodes. A photo reporter casually witnesses a stealing to the Arch of Janus and is involved in an intricated plot.
- Il killer – dark comedy by Dino Bartolo Partesano, written by Cesare Zavattini, with Paolo Villaggio and Oreste Lionello; 3 episodes. An ice-cream manufacturer hires a killer to eliminate a rival.

==== For children ====
- Le avventure di Ciuffettino (Little Turft’s adventures) – by Angelo D’Alessandro, from the Yambo’s novel, with Maurizio Ancidoni. A runaway boy lives, or dreams, fabulous asventures.
- Gulliver – by Carla Ragionieri, with Arturo Corso, music by Fabrizio De André; 10 episodes. The Jonathan Swift’s novel is adapted in a musical comedy with a mixed cast of actors and puppets.
- La filibusta (Filibuster) – musical show by Beppe Recchia, written by Franco Franchi, with Donatello Falchi, Gianni Magni and various famous singers as guest stars; 8 episodes. A pirate ghost tells to the customers of an inn the life of the most famous buccaneers.
- Il leone di San Marco (St. Mark’s lyon) – by Alda Grimaldi, with Paola Quattrini and Carlo Giuffrè; 6 episodes. It tells the story of Venice from 1725 to 1866, towards the decadence of the old Republic, the foreign dominions and the Risorgimento.

=== Variety ===
- Canzonissima 1969 – hosted by Johnny Dorelli, the Kessler Twins and Raimondo Vianello and won by Gianni Morandi with Ma chi se ne importa? The show doesn't get its usual public success and is harshly criticized by the press, for its excessive expenses and its frivolity (the airing coincides with the hot autumn and the Piazza Fontana bombing).
- Aiuto, è vacanza! (Help, there are the holidays!) – summer show, directed by Eros Macchi, with Walter Chiari and Isabella Biagini.
- Incontri musicali (Musical encounters) – hosted by Enza Sampò.
- È domenica ma senza impegno (It's Sunday, but with no obligations) and La domenica è un’altra cosa (Sunday is something else)– by Vito Molinari; shows of the Sunday afternoon, hosted respectively by Paolo Villaggio and Raffaele Pisu.
- Incontro con Lucio Battisti (Meeting Lucio Battisti) - hosted by Battisti himself and Loretta Goggi.
- A che gioco giochiamo? (What game do we play?) game show about history of painting, hosted by Corrado.
- Stasera... (Tonight...) – by Antonello Falqui, cycle of six monographic show about stars as Gina Lollobrigida, Gianni Morandi and Patty Pravo.
- Bentornata Caterina, by Vito Molinari, with Caterina Valente.

=== News and educational ===
- Dicono di lei (They say about you) – interviews by Enzo Biagi.
- Gli uomini della luna rispondono (The moon men answer) – press conference of the three Apollo 11 astronauts, hosted by Sergio Zavoli.
- Un volto, una storia (A face, a story) – magazine care of Gian Paolo Cresci, with interviews to public personalities or common people who lived significant experiences.
- L’Italia dei dialetti (The dialects’ Italy) – linguistic enquiry by Giacomo Devoto, directed by Virgilio Sabel; in 14 episodes.
- Antologia dei capolavori nascosti (Hidden amsterpieces’ anthology) – art magazine, hosted by Emma Danieli.
- Speciale TvM – didactical program, aimed to the conscript soldiers, hosted by Laura Efrikian.

=== Ending this year ===
- Il triangolo rosso

== Deaths ==
- April 23: Camillo Mastrocinque, 67, director.
