= 1972 in Italian television =

This is a list of Italian television related events from 1972.

== Events ==
- January 6: Nicola Di Bari wins Canzonissima with Chitarra suona più piano.
- January 26: The doctor Massimo Inardi, an expert in classical music, loses the title of champion of the quiz Rischiatutto. He had retained the title for eight weeks, after having gained the (by then) astronomical sum of 48.300.000 liras. Inardi, a renowned parapsychology scholar, became very popular and received the nickname of “magician” for his presumed extrasensory perception power to read the quiz's answers in the mind of the presenter Mike Bongiorno. In June, Inardi wins the final of the show.
- 24–26 February: Sanremo Festival, hosted by Mike Bongiorno, Sylvia Koscina and Paolo Villaggio. The winner is Nicola Di Bari with I giorni dell’arcobaleno (Rainbows’ day). The festival is the most seen show of the year, with 26,3 million viewers.
- April 6: Beginning of broadcasts for the cable television channel Telebiella, founded by the businessman and TV director Giuseppe Sacchi and by the anchorman Enzo Tortora. In spite of its poor means, it is met with a wide success in the Biella district. Its example is followed by other local cable television channels in the whole Italy. Another breaking in the RAI monopoly are the foreign channels (TSI1, Tv Koper-Capodistria, Antenne 2) relayed also in the internal regions of Italy by private aerials.
- August 26: RAI broadcasts in PAL color the opening ceremony of the 1972 Summer Olympics. Until September 11, the games are shown in color, alternating between the PAL and SECAM systems. The German system appears to be the superior one. The expected transition of RAI to color television, wanted by the Post and Communication minister Giovanni Gioia, is however further delayed by the opposition of the Republican Party, which sees it as an incentive to consumerism. The Republican Party threatens a government crisis about the matter.
- September 20: for the Festa dell’Unità, the PCI puts into operation a cable television channel, broadcasting the events of the festival.
- December 15: the convention assigning the radio-TV services to RAI, is expected to expire after twenty years. It is extended for another year.

== Debuts ==
=== Variety ===
- Adesso musica (Now music) – music show, hosted by Vanna Brosio and Nino Fuscagni.

=== For children ===
- La festa della mamma (Mother's day) – annual show, organized by the Institute of Antoniano.
- Scacco al re (Check to the king) – game show, inspired to the chess, ideated by Cino Tortorella, hosted by Ettore Andenna.
- Gulp (later Supergulp) – show of “TV comics”, care of Guido De Maria and Giancarlo Governi, with characters both classical (Corto Maltese) and specially created (Nick Carter). It's the most beloved Italian show for children in the Seventies.

=== News and educational ===
- Io e... - Appunti sulla bellezza (Me and... - Notes about beauty) – by Luciano Emmer. An important personality of the Italian culture gives his advice about a place or a work of art. The cycle is inaugurated by Amintore Fanfani talking about the Madonna del Parto and closed by Pier Paolo Pasolini; noticeable too the interventions of Federico Fellini and Franco Zeffirelli.

== Television shows ==
=== Drama ===
- Il numero 10 (Number 10) – by Silvio Maestranzi, with Josè Quaglio, about Maximilian Kolbe.
- Ipotesi sulla scomparsa di un fisico atomico (Hypothesis about an atomic physicist's disappearance) – by Leandro Castellani, with Orso Maria Guerrini, about Ettore Majorana.
- La tecnica e il rito (The technique and the ritual) – by Miklos Jancso; a parable about the power through Attila’s life.
- Lulù – by Sandro Bolchi from the Carlo Bertolazzi’s piece, with Paola Quattrini.
- Danton's death, by Georg Buchner, directed by Mario Missiroli, with Gastone Moschin (Danton) and Mariano Rigillo (Robespierre).
- Tutte le domeniche mattina (Every Sunday morning) – by Carlo Tuzii, with Sergio Endrigo; love story among the Italian migrants in Switzerland.
- Donnarumma all’assalto (Donnarumma attacks) – by Marco Leto, from the Ottiero Ottieri's novel, with Gianni Garko and Stefano Satta Flores. The construction of a factory in Pozzuoli puts in conflict the industrial culture (represented by a corporate psychologist) and the ancestral one of Southern Italy (represented by the unemployed Donnarumma) .

=== Miniseries ===
- I Nicotera – by Salvatore Nocita, with Turi Ferro; in five episodes, about the troubles of a Sicilian family immigrated to Milan.
- Con rabbia e con dolore (With rage and grief) – by Giuseppe Fina, with Sergio Fantoni and Tino Carraro; an idealistic architect comes into contrast with his father-in-law, an unscrupulous building contractor.
- Sul filo della memoria (On the thread of memory) - by Leandro Castellani, with Renzo Palmer and Nino Castelnuovo; drama about Anonima sarda.

==== Period drama ====
- Agostino di Ippona (Augustine of Hippo), Blaise Pascal (with Pierre Arditi in the title role) and The age of the Medici – docudramas by Roberto Rossellini about history of philosophy.
- Sorelle Materassi (Materassi sisters) – by Mario Ferrero, with Sarah Ferrati, Rina Morelli, Giuseppe Pambieri and the appearance of a novice Roberto Benigni; in three episodes, from the Aldo Palazzeschi's novel The Sisters Materassi. The life of two aged spinsters is upset by their senile passion for a reckless nephew.
- I demoni (Demons) – by Sandro Bolchi, with Luigi Vannucchi (Stavrogin), Glauco Mauri (Verchovenskij) and Warner Bentivegna (Kirilov); in five episodes, from the Dostoevskij’s novel, script by Diego Fabbri.
- Il marchese di Roccavedina – by Edmo Fenoglio, script by Tullio Pinelli, from the Luigi Capuana's novel, with Domenico Modugno and Marisa Belli; 3 episodes. A Sicilian aristocrat commits a crime of passion and goes unpunished, but remorse drives him to madness.

==== Fantasy ====
- A come Andromeda (A for Andromeda) – by Vittorio Cottafavi, from the Fred Hoyle’s novel, with Nicoletta Rizzi, Luigi Vannucchi, Tino Carraro and Paola Pitagora; remake of a BBC show, in five episodes. First Italian experiment with the science fiction serial (the Scottish setting of the story was actually reconstructed in Lombardy and Sardinia); its success, beside the one of Il segno del comando, induced RAI, in the next years, to follow the way of the fantastic stories. Very suggestive soundtrack by Marco Migliardi.
- The adventures of Pinocchio – by Luigi Comencini, from the Collodi’s novel, with Nino Manfredi (Mister Geppetto), Franco and Ciccio (The fox and the cat), Gina Lollobrigida (The fairy with turquoise hair) and the little Andrea Balestri (Pinocchio), music by Fiorenzo Carpi; in six episodes. Comencini underlines the realistic sides of the book and takes some liberties with the plot (the Pinocchio's metamorphosis in child is put at the beginning instead of the end); however, his version is the same considered the nearest one to the Collodi's spirit. The serial is the greatest RAI production of the year, shot in colors and adapted also in a movie.

==== Mystery ====
- Joe Petrosino – by Daniele D’Anza, from the Arrigo Petacco's book, with Adolfo Celi in the title role; in five episodes. The serial, also if set in the 1900s, brings to the TV public pressing questions as the bounds between the Mafia and politics.
- La pietra di luna (The moonstone) – by Anton Giulio Majano; in six episodes, from the Wilkie Collins’ novel.
- La donna di picche (The spade woman) – by Leonardo Cortese, with Ubaldo Lay, in five episodes; last enquiry of the lieutenant Sheridan, who in the ending is hit by a bullet.
- Il sospetto (Suspicion) and Il giudice e il suo boia (The judge and his hangman) – by Daniele D’Anza, from two Friedrich Durrematt’s detective stories, in two episodes each. Paolo Stoppa, as the policeman and avenger Barlach, is sided by Adolfo Celi (Il sospetto) and Ugo Pagliai (Il giudice e il suo boia).

=== Variety ===
- Amico flauto (Flute, my friend) and Tutto è pop (Everything is pop) - musical shows, hosted, respectively, by Renzo Arbore and Vittorio Salvetti.
- Il buono e il cattivo (The good and the bad) – by Beppe Recchia, with Cochi Ponzoni (the bad) and Renato Pozzetto (the good); first great success of the comic duo, and of their demented and non-conformist humor.
- Canzonissima 1972 – presented by Pippo Baudo and Loretta Goggi, who shows her talent also as singer and moreover as impersonator, and with Vittorio Gassman as constant guest; the contest is won by Massimo Ranieri with Erba di casa mia.
- Sai che ti dico? (You know what) – by Antonello Falqui, with Raimondo Vianello and Sandra Mondaini, and Gilbert Becaud as constant guest; it inaugurates the long series of shows at the service of the couple (in life and art) Vianello and Mondaini.
- Gli ultimi cento secondi (Last hundred seconds) – quiz hosted by Ric and Gian.
- Teatro 11 – by Enzo Trapani; parody of Teatro 10, shot in the same studio, hosted by Franco Franchi and Loretta Goggi.
- C'è Celentano with Adriano Celentano.

=== News and educational ===
- C’è musica e musica (There is music and music) – by Gianfranco Mingozzi, hosted by Luciano Berio; educational show about music, in every form (“from Monteverdi to the Beatles”).
- Una donna un paese (A woman, a country) - by Carlo Lizzani and Claudio Nasso; interviews to 13 prominent women of politics and culture from the whole world, from Carla Fracci to Indira Gandhi.
- Stasera - magazine, hosted by Sergio Zavoli.

==== History ====
- Nascita di una dittatura (Birth of a dictatorship) – by Sergio Zavoli; inquiry in six episodes about the coming to power of the fascism, fifty years after the march on Rome. It's today again a precious historical document for the interviews to the survivor witnesses of the events, fascist or antifascist, some of which (as Amedeo Bordiga) deceased before the airing.
- Le radici della libertà (The roots of freedom) – docufiction by Ermanno Olmi, written by Corrado Stajano, about four relevant anti-fascists: Giovanni Minzoni, Giovanni Amendola, Lauro De Bosis and Camilla Ravera.
- Storie dell’emigrazione (Stories about emigration ) – by Alessandro Blasetti; historical enquiry in five episodes about Italian diaspora.

== Ending this year ==
- L’approdo
- Chissà chi lo sa
- Teatro 10
- Le inchieste del commissario Maigret

== Deaths ==
- March 27: Father Mariano da Torino, (65), Capuchin friar, popular tele predicator.
