= 1963 in Italian television =

This is a list of Italian television related events from 1963.

== Events ==
- January 6: Tony Renis wins Canzonissima 1962 with Quando quando quando.
- January 20: First issue of the magazine TV7 (see below). it is inaugurated by a director Giorgio Vecchietti's interview to the Italian president Antonio Segni.
- February 6: Tony Renis, now teamed with Emilio Pericoli, wins also the 1963 Sanremo music festival with Uno per tutte. The final evening of the contest, hosted by Mike Bongiorno, is the most seen show of the year, with 13, 4 million viewiers.
- 27 July – For the first time, RAI airs the David di Donatello ceremony.
- 8–9 October – Vajont dam disaster. RAI suspends for a day the ordinary schedule and carries in the Italian houses the images of the tragedy. On 14 October, TV7 (see below) airs, without preventive control, a report of the free-lancer Antonello Branca where the survivors denounce openly the human responsibilities for the slaughter. Later, both Branca and the TV7 chief editor Claudio Savonuzzi are removed from RAI.
- 22 November : at 8:37 p.m., on the evening news, Ruggero Orlando, in a telephone connection from New York, announces the death of John Fitzgerald Kennedy to Italy. RAI suspends programming and until midnight broadcasts three extraordinary editions of the news, followed by 11 million viewers.

== Debuts ==
=== News and educational ===
- Almanacco di scienza, storia e varia umanità (Almanach of science, history and petty culture) – program of popular science and culture, hosted by Giancarlo Sbragia and, later, by Nando Gazzolo.
- L’approdo (The landing) – literary magazine, hosted by Edmonda Aldini and Giancarlo Sbragia, with illustrious collaborators as Riccardo Bacchelli and Giuseppe Ungaretti, already existing on radio (since 1944) and on paper (since 1952). Often accused to be boring and elitist, it's however a precious witness about the Italian cultural life by then.
- TV7 – weekly magazine of journalistic analysis, hosted by Sergio Zavoli, with important collaborators as Piero Angela, Corrado Augias, Goffredo Parise, and even Pier Paolo Pasolini. In contrast with the conformism of the official news programs, the TV7's reportages face thorny subject with a vivacious style; for this, they often cause controversies and suffer censures. The program, after having changed the heading many times, is again on air by now, with the original title.

=== Variety ===
- Il cantatutto – musical show, by Mario Landi, hosted by Claudio Villa, Milva and Nicola Arigliano, with Franco and Ciccio as constant guests; two seasons.
- La fiera dei sogni (The dreams’ fair) – quiz show, hosted by Mike Bongiorno; three seasons.
- Johnny 7, with Johnny Dorelli, debuting as TV host; 3 seasons.

=== Miniseries ===
- United States - Dr. Kildare

== Television shows ==
=== Drama ===
- La bella addormentata (Sleeping beauty) – by Eros Macchi, from the Perrault’s fable, with Alberto Lupo and Maria Grazia Spina.
- Grandezza naturale (Life size) – by Carlo Ludovici, with Mario Feliciani and Ugo Pagliai, from the Henri Troyat's play; family drama set in the world of the theatre.
- Il taglio del bosco (The cut of the forest) – by Vittorio Cottafavi, with Gian Maria Volontè and no-professional actors, from the Carlo Cassola’s novel; a lumberman tries vainly to forget by the work the loss of his wife.
- The glass menagerie by Tennessee Williams, directed by Vittorio Cottafavi, with Sarah Ferrati, Anna Maria Guarnieri and Umberto Orsini.
- Cardinal Lambertini by Alfredo Testoni, directed by Silverio Blasi, with Gino Cervi in the title role and Claudio Gora.
- The trial of Jesus by Diego Fabbri, directed by Sandro Bolchi, with Mario Feliciani. The re-enacting of the Jesus’ trial by a Jewish troupe becomes a debate about the meaning of the Christian faith in the modern world.

=== Miniseries ===
- Delitto e castigo (Crime and punishment) – by Anton Giulio Majano, with Luigi Vannucchi and Ilaria Occhini, from the Dostoevskij’s novel; in six episodes.
- Giuseppe Verdi – by Mario Ferrero; biopic in five episodes, with Sergio Fantoni in the title role.
- La sciarpa (The scarf) by Guglielmo Morandi and Paura per Janet (Fear for Janet) by Daniele D’Anza, both in six episodes and with Aroldo Tieri as protagonist; remakes of two BBC mysteries (The scarf and A time of day) written by Francis Durbridge. The two miniseries get an unexpected success that induces RAI to replicate the formula; for a decade, the adaptations from Durbridge (so-called Gialli Durbridge) will be a fixture for the Italian viewers.
- Il mulino del Po (The mill on the Po) – by Sandro Bolchi, with Raf Vallone, Giulia Lazzarini and Tino Carraro, from the Riccardo Bacchelli's novel, adapted by the author; in the Po Valley of the Nineteenth Century, the adventures of a miller, veteran of the Napoleonic wars, and his fight with a gang of smugglers. Among the dramatized novels of the Sixties (sceneggiati), it's one of the most appreciated by public and critic and the first mostly shot in exteriors.
- Demetrio Pianelli – by Sandro Bolchi, with Paolo Stoppa, from the Emilio De Marchi's novel; the family and economic troubles of a poor clerk in the Milan of the Nineteenth century,
- Le anime morte (The dead souls) – by Edmo Fenoglio, with Gastone Moschin, from the Nikolaj Gogol’s novel.
- Papà Grandet – by Alessandro Brissoni, with Aldo Silvani, from Balzac’s Eugenie Grandet.
- Peppino Girella – written, directed and interpreted by Eduardo De Filippo, with the child Giuseppe Fusco; fresco of the Naples society through the story of a boy keeping the family with his work.

=== Serials ===
- Ritorna il tenente Sheridan (Lieutenant Sheridan comes back) – by Mario Landi, with Ubaldo Lay.

=== Variety ===
- Gran premio (Grand Prix) – 1963 edition of Canzonissima, hosted by Lina Volonghi; after the polemics for the 1962 edition with Dario Fo, the show comes back to disengagement, with a song tournament among the Italian regions.
- Canzoniere minimo (Little song book) – show in ten episodes about the Italian folk song, with Giorgio Gaber
- Il signore di mezza età (The middle-aged gentleman) – satire of manners, hosted by Marcello Marchesi (also author, with Camilla Cederna).

=== News and educational ===
- Viaggio nell’Italia che cambia (Travel in the changing Italy) – enquiry in five episodes by Ugo Zatterin about the Italian economy in the years of the economic miracle.
- Storia della bomba atomica (History of the atomic bomb) – documentary by Virgilio Sabel, in collaboration with the writer Giuseppe Berto, with the witnesses of Robert Oppenheimer and Leo Szilard, awarded at the Prix Italia as best program of the year.
- Età di Stalin (Age of Stalin) – by Liliana Cavani, 3 episodes.

== Deaths ==
- June 2: Giacomo Vaccari, 32, director, by a car accident.
