= 1970 in Italian television =

This is a list of Italian television related events from 1970.

== Events ==
- 6 January: for the second time in a row, Gianni Morandi wins Canzonissima with Ma chi se ne importa?
- 30 January: in TV7, the Sergio Zavoli’s reportage Un codice da rifare (The code must be redone), is aired; it asks for the reform of the Italian penal code, still the same ideated by the fascist minister Alfredo Rocco. The program causes a harsh dispute inside RAI: Zavoli is attacked on the press by the vice-president Italo De Feo and defended by the general director Ettore Bernabei and by the RAI journalists who, for the first time in the story of the estate, go on strike.
- 7-15 February: for the first time RAI shots in colours (with the PAL system) an event, the FIS Alpine World Ski Championships in Val Gardena. Paradoxically, the work is realized only for the viewers abroad, the Italian television being again in black and white.
- 18 February : the RAI president, Aldo Sandulli, resigns because the controversies due to Un codice da rifare; the vice-president Umberto Delle Fave replaces him.
- 26-28 February: Sanremo Festival, hosted by Nuccio Costa and Enrico Maria Salerno. The winners are Adriano Celentano and his wife Claudia Mori, with Chi non lavora non fa l’amore (No work, no sex). The song contains ironic references to the workers' protest of the Hot Autumn, and is perceived as reactionary.
- May 20: two major Italian TV stars, the comic actor Walter Chiari and the musician and presenter Lelio Luttazzi, are arrested for drug trafficking. In 1971, at the trial, Chiari gets a suspended sentence for personal use of cocaine and Luttazzi is fully exonerated. The affair seriously damages the careers of both.
- 17 June: 17 millions of Italian viewers stay up until 2 AM, due to the time zones to follow the televised “match of the century”, Italy v West Germany, commented by Nando Martellini; with the victory of the Italian team unleashing popular enthusiasm. On 21 June, the 1970 FIFA world cup final Italia-Brazil gets the greatest audience of the year, with 28.2 million viewers.
- 8 July: in the Fucino Space Centre, the second telescopic parabolic antennas is inaugurated; it allows RAI to receive TV transmissions from Far East and Pacific Ocean.

== Debuts ==
=== Drama ===
- Sperimentali per la TV – cycle of experimental TV, care of Italo Moscati, directed mostly by Italian beginners directors (Gianni Amelio, Maurizio Ponzi, Peter Del Monte) but also by international authors, such as Jean-Luc Godard and Glauber Rocha; lasted till 1975.

=== Miniserie ===
- Sweden - Pippi Longstocking

=== News and educational ===
- 90. minuto – sport column of the Sunday evening, giving the results and showing the goals of the Serie A matches; hosted for twenty years by Paolo Valenti and later by various sport journalists. Very popular in Seventies and Eighties, it’s again on air also if it has lost most of its appeal with the advent of the sporting pay-tv.
- A come agricoltura (A for agriculture) – magazine for the farmers; 11 seasons.
- Habitat, un ambiente per l’uomo (Hanitat, an environment for the man) first RAI magazine about ecology, care of Giulio Macchi, lasted till 1978.
- Medicina oggi (Medicine today) – care of Paolo Mocci, 3 seasons.
- Turno C – care of Giuseppe Momoli, magazine about work and union questions.
- Giorni d’Europa – weekly magazine about the European Union.

=== Variety ===
- Rischiatutto – quiz, inspired by Jeopardy! and hosted by Mike Buongiorno; five seasons. The show renews the Lascia o raddoppiìa?’s mass success and relaunches the Bongiorno’s career after a period of relative decline; it’s the first RAI 2 program to enter in the top ten of the audience. It’s yet also accused by critics of notionism and sexism (for the decorative role played by the “female valet” Sabina Ciuffini).

=== For children ===
- Gli eroi di cartone (Cartoon heroes) – hosted by Lucio Dalla and Franco Mulè (3 seasons) and Mille e una sera (1001 evenings): programs about the history of animated cartoon, both ideated by the historian of cinema Gianni Rondolino and focused (the second moreover) on the European and independent production.
- Il paese di Giocagiò (Giocagiò country) – show for pre-schoolers, care of Gianni Rodari and Teresa Bongiorno, scenography by Emanuele Luzzati. In the second seasons, it changes name in Il gioco delle cose (The things game).

== Shows of the year ==
=== Drama ===
- Le donne balorde (The oafish women) – cycle of satirical one-act plays, written and played by Franca Valeri and directed by Giacomo Colli.
- Napoli 1860 – La fine dei Borboni (Neaples 1860, The Bourbons’ fall) – by Alessandro Blasetti, with Bruno Cirino as Francis II of the Two Sicilies; 2 episodes.
- Perè Goriot – from the Honoré de Balzac’s novel, with Tino Buazzelli (also director) and Paolo Ferrari.
- L’amica delle mogli (The wives’ friend) – by Giorgio De Lullo, from the Luigi Pirandello’s play, with Rossella Falk and Romolo Valli; a spinster pretends to rule her friends' marriages, but her meddling has tragic consequences.

==== Tv-Movies ====
In 1970, RAI chooses to sustain the Italian author cinema, producing movies for TV by renowned authors or by debuting directors, which are, at the same time, aired in television and distributed in the theatres.

- I clowns – by Federico Fellini.
- The spider’s stratagem – by Bernardo Bertolucci.
- I recuperanti (The recoverers) - by Ermanno Olmi; script by Tullio Kezich and Mario Rigoni Stern. In the Forties, a young veteran and an eccentric old man earn a living from the dangerous work to recover remnants of war.
- La fine del gioco (The end of the game) – by the debuting Gianni Amelio, with Ugo Gregoretti. A tough kid seems to leave his isolation when he’s chosen by a movie director for a documentary.

=== Miniseries ===
- Antonio Meucci, cittadino toscano, contro il monopolio Bell (The Tuscan citizen Antonio Meucci vs. the Bell monopoly) – biopic by Daniele D’Anza, with Paolo Stoppa in the title role; 3 episodes.
- Le cinque giornate di Milano (Five days of Milan) – by Leandro Castellani, script by Luigi Lunari, with Ugo Pagliai (Count von Hübner), Raoul Grassilli (Carlo Cattaneo) and Arnoldo Foà (Marshal Radetzky); 5 episodes.
- Fight for survival – by Renzo Rossellini, ideated and supervised by his father Roberto; 12 episodes. Docufiction about the history of mankind, focused on the scientific and cultural progress.
- La carretta dei comici (The actors' cart) – by Andrea Camilleri, with Peppino De Filippo; the adventures of a shabby mummers company crossing the centuries, from the Seventeenth century to the Risorgimento.

==== Mystery ====
- Il cappello del prete (The priest's hat) – by Sandro Bolchi, with Luigi Vannucchi, from Emilio De Marchi's novel The Priest's Hat, considered the first Italian detective story; 3 episodes.
- Coralba – by Daniele D’Anza, with Rossano Brazzi and Glauco Mauri; 5 episodes. The story is set in Hamburg, in the world of big pharma
- I giovedì della signora Giulia (Mrs. Julia Thursdays) – by Paolo Nuzzi and Massimo Scaglione, from the Piero Chiara’s novel, with Claudio Gora and the real-life private eye Tom Ponzi (as a police superintendent); 5 episodes. The vanishing of an upper-class lady is the starting point for an enquiry about the secrets of the Lombard provincial life.
- Un certo Harry Brent – from Francis Durbridge’s A man called Harry Brent, by Leonardo Cortese, with Alberto Lupo and Roberto Herlitzka; 6 episodes.
- I racconti di Padre Brown (Father Brown's tales) - by Vittorio Cottafavi, from Gilbert Keith Chesterton, with Renato Rascel in the title role and Arnoldo Foà as Flambeau; in 6 episodes. It's one of the successes of the year; an episode gets 21 million viewiers.
- Una pistola in vendita (A gun for sale) – by Vittorio Cottafavi, from the Grahan Greene’s novel, with Corarado Pani and Ilaria Occhini.

Coralba and I giovedì della signora Giulia are the first Italian mysteries shot in colors (also if, at the time, they are aired in black and white).

==== For children ====
- La fantastica storia di Don Chisciotte della Mancia (Don Quijote de la Mancha’s fantastic story) – by Carlo Quartucci, script by Roberto Lerici, from the Miguel de Cervantes’ novel, with Gigi Proietti in the title role; 5 episodes. Aired as a show for children, it’s actually a sophisticated product, taking to television some practices of the avant-garde theatre.
- Marcovaldo – by Giuseppe Bennati, from the Italo Calvino's book, with Nanni Loy in the title role; 6 episodes.
- Verso l’avventura (Towards adventure) – by Pino Passalacqua, with Mebratù Maconnen Araia; 14 episodes. Miniseries about the adventures of an Ethiopian kid looking for a treasure.

=== Serials ===
- Qualcuno bussa alla porta (Someone is knocking at the door) – by various directors, written by Tonino Guerra. Cycle of fiveTV movie, dangling between comedy and thriller; all the stories are set in the closed space of an apartment and are variation on the theme of the unexpected visitor.
- FBI – Francesco Bertolazzi investigatore – detective comedy, written and interpreted by Ugo Tognazzi as a down-to-heel and clumsy private eye.

=== Variety ===
- Canzonissima 1970 – directed by Romolo Siena, hosted by Corrado Mantoni and Raffaella Carrà (who gets success also as a singer, with the title track Ma che musica maestro). The contest is won by Massimo Ranieri with Vent’anni.
- Io ci provo (I try) – by Enzo Trapani, with Ornella Vanoni.
- La cugina Orietta (Cousin Orietta) – musical variety with Orietta Berti, at her debut as TV host.
- E noi qui – (We are here) – with Giorgio Gaber, Ombretta Colli and Gino Bramieri.
- Io, Agata e tu – with Nino Ferrer and Nino Taranto; the show reveals the talent of Raffaella Carrà as a soubrette.
- Signore e signora – mix of musical variety and sitcom, with Lando Buzzanca and Delia Scala playing three married couples (a middle-class one, a snobbish one and one of peasants).
- Il telecanzoniere – reportage about the Italian pop music, hosted by Sandro Ciotti (more known as sport commentator)

=== News and educational ===
- I bambini e noi (Children and us) – reportage by Luigi Comencini about infancy in Italy, in 6 episodes.
- Uno, alla luna – enquiry by Virgilio Sabel about children’s games in Italy.
- Un secolo di lotte contadine in Italia (A century of peasants’ fights in Italy) – historical enquiry by Giorgio Bocca, in one of his very rare collaborations with RAI; in 7 episodes.
- Roma capitale (Rome capital city) – historical enquiry, care of Giovanni Spadolini, for the centenary of the capture of Rome.
- Alla ricerca di Tadzio (Looking for Tadzio) – by Luchino Visconti; behind the scenes about the auditions for the choosing of Death in Venice’s young protagonist.
- Boomerang, ricerca in due sere (An enquiry in two evening) – care of Luigi Pedrazzi; current affairs and culture magazine, where a theme is developed in two episodes (one of documentary and one of debate).

== Ending this year ==
- Doppia coppia
- La famiglia Benvenuti
- Settevoci
- Speciale per voi
