= 1973 in Italian television =

This is a list of Italian television related events of 1973.

== Events ==
- 6 January: Massimo Ranieri wins Canzonissima 1972 with Erba di casa mia.
- 24 January: the Turin tribunal authorizes Telebiella to broadcast by cable. The new-born television channel is met with a noticeable public success and, on 25 March, starts its news program. In the following months, several other cable televisions are born in Piedmont and Liguria. They associate in the FIET Cavo.
- 10 March: the Sanremo festival is won by Peppino di Capri with Un grande amore e niente più. For the first time, the show is shot in color by the RAI cameras, but only for broadcast abroad. The Italian public will only be able to see the color version of this show in 2016, on RaiPlay. On 9 March, the Naples-based cable television channel Telediffusione Italiana beats RAI to the draw, broadcasting in preview songs and interviews with the singers.
- 29 March: the Minister of Communication Giovanni Gioia emanates by decree the new Mail Code, confirming the RAI monopoly and outlawing the private cable channels. In May, PRI secretary Ugo La Malfa, in opposition to the decree, asks for Gioia's resignation and retires the confidence-and-supply agreement to the Andreotti government. The event causes a cabinet crisis. A joke says: “Andreotti fell, tripping over the Telebiella's cable.”
- 1 June: a functionary of the Mail Police cuts and seals the Telebiella cables, applying the Gioa decree. Giuseppe Sacchi, Telebiella's owner and leader of the cable television movement, appeals to the Court of Justice of the European Union, which acknowledges his reasons.
- 26 September: RAI broadcasts the TV drama 1870, the last leading role for Anna Magnani. In a sad coincidence, the great actress dies a few hours before the airing.
- 2 December: because the oil crisis, the end of RAI broadcasting is set to 10.45 PM, as a measure for energy saving,

== Debuts ==
=== Serials ===
- Qui Squadra mobile (Here, flying squad) – procedural set in Rome, directed by Anton Giulio Majano, with Giancarlo Sbragia, Orazio Orlando and Luigi Vannucchi; 2 seasons.

=== Variety ===
- Il Dirodorlando – game show for kids, directed by Cino Tortorella, hosted by Ettore Andenna; 2 seasons.
- Sim Salabim – show of magic, with Silvan; 2 seasons.

=== News and educational ===
- Dribbling – sport magazine.
- Protestantesimo (Protestantism) – magazine, care of the Federation of Evangelical Churches in Italy.
- Sorgente di vita (Spring of life) – magazine of Hebraic culture, care of the UCEI.

All three the shows are still broadcast.

== Shows of the year ==
=== Drama ===
- St. Michel had a rooster – by the Taviani brothers, with Giulio Brogi.
- Cartesius – by Roberto Rosselini; biopic in two episodes, with Ugo Cardea in the title role.
- Delitto di regime – Il caso Don Minzoni (Regime crime – The Don Minzoni affair) – by Leandro Castellani, with Raoul Grassilli (Don Giovanni Minzoni) and Giulio Brogi (Italo Balbo); in 2 episodes.
- 1870 – by Alfredo Giannetti, with Marcello Mastroianni and Anna Magnani; historical drama about the Capture of Rome (see over).
- Le ultime lettere di Jacopo Ortis (The last letters of Jacopo Ortis) – by Peter Del Monte, from the Ugo Foscolo’s novel, with Stefano Oppedisano, last role of Sergio Tofano as Giuseppe Parini.
- Serata al gatto nero (Soiree at the black cat) – by Mario Landi, with Pino Colizzi, 2 episodes. The plot (a Montecarlo inspector enquiries in a night club about a jewels robbery) is almost a pretest to show variety numbers.
- Vestire gli ignudi (To clothe the naked) – from the Luigi Piarandello's play, directed by Vittorio Cottafavi, with Ileana Ghione and Stefano Satta-Flores; a woman tries to hide her bleak past and get the respectability, but the symbolic dress is torn off her.
- The lark by Jean Anhouil, directed by Vittorio Cottafavi, with Ileana Ghione as Joan of Arc.

=== Miniseries ===
- Diario di un maestro (Journal of a primary school teacher) – by Vittorio De Seta, with Bruno Cirino; 4 episodes. Inspired by the Albino Bernardini’s experiences, it describes the pedagogic experiments of a young and idealistic teacher, often in contrast with the school bureaucracy, amidst the social decay of the Rome suburbs. The serial is also adapted in a movie for the big screen.
- ESP – paranormal drama by Daniele D’Anza, with Paolo Stoppa as Gerard Croiset; in 4 episodes.
- Lungo il fiume e sull’acqua (Along the river and on the water) – by Alberto Negrin, with Giampiero Albertini and Sergio Fantoni; detective story in 5 episodes, from Francis Durbridge’s The other man, but with a different ending. It's the most successful fiction of the year, with 21 million viewers.
- Nessuno deve sapere (Nobody must know) by Mario Landi, with Stefania Casini, 6 episodes, and Il picciotto by Alberto Negrin, with Michele Placido, 3 episodes; first RAI fictions about the Mafia with a modern setting.

==== Period dramas ====
- Eleonora – by Silverio Blasi, script by Tullio Pinelli, with Giulietta Masina and Giulio Brogi, in 6 episodes; set in Milan at the time of the “scapigliatura”, it tells the troubled love between an upper-class girl and a bohemian painter.
- Napoleone a Sant’Elena (Napoleon in Saint Helena) – by Vittorio Cottafavi, with Renzo Palmer in the title role, in 4 episodes.
- Puccini – biopic by Sandro Bolchi, with Alberto Lionello in the title role, in 5 episodes.
- Tre camerati (Three comrades) – by Lydia C. Ripandelli, with Renzo Palmer, Angelo Infanti and Luigi Pistilli, from the Erich Maria Remarque’s novel, in 3 episodes.
- Vino e pane – by Piero Schivazappa, with Pier Paolo Capponi and Scilla Gabel, from Ignazio Silone’s Bread and wine, in 4 episodes.
- La rappresentazione della terribile caccia alla balena bianca Moby Dick (The representation of the awful hunt to the white whale Moby Dick) – by Carlo Quartucci, with Franco Parenti as Captain Ahab, theatrical adaptation of the Hermann Melville’s novel, in 5 episodes.
- Il caso Lafarge (The Lafarge affair) by Marco Leto, with Paola Pitagora as Maria Lafarge; 4 episodes.

=== Serials ===
- La porta sul buio (Door into the darkness) – series of 4 one-hour thriller, directed or supervised by Dario Argento.
- Vado a vedere il mondo, capisco tutto e torno (I go to see the world, understand everything and come back) – serial, sponsored by Alitalia, about the tour around the world of two newlyweds on their honeymoon.
- Storie dell’anno Mille (Stories from the year 1000) – by Franco Indovina, from the Tonino Guerra’s and Luigi Malerba’s book, with Carmelo Bene and Franco Parenti; 4 episodes. A knight and two disbanded soldiers live tragicomic adventures in a grotesque middle-age; distributed two years before in a movie version.

=== Variety ===
- Canzonissima 1973 – hosted by Pippo Baudo and Mita Medici, won by Gigliola Cinquetti with Alle porte del sole; for the first time, the traditional show of the autumn is moved from Saturday evening to Sunday afternoon.
- Dove sta Zazà? (Where Zazà is?)– by Antonello Falqui, with Gabriella Ferri and the Bagaglino troupe; history of the Italian cabaret, from the belle epoque to the Seventies.
- Formula 2 – by Eros Macchi, with Alighiero Noschese and Loretta Goggi. The show, where the two hosts can prove all their talent as impersonators, is the greatest public success of the year, with 21,800 million wieners. As Dove sta Zazà?, it's shot in colors but aired in black and white.
- Hai visto mai? (Have you never seen? – by Enzo Trapani, with Gino Bramieri and Lola Falana.
- Il poeta e il contadino (The poet and the farmer) – with Cochi e Renato, written by Enzo Jannacci; surreal cabaret, focused on the contrast between a cynical intellectual (Cochi) and a naive man of the people (Renato).
- L’appuntamento (The appointment) – by Antonello Falqui, with Walter Chiari (coming back in television after his judiciary troubles) and Ornella Vanoni.

=== News and educational ===
- In viaggio tra le stelle (Travelling in the stars) – program of popular science about astronomy, hosted by Mino Damato.
- Chung Kuo, Cina – reportage about China after the cultural revolution, by Michelangelo Antonioni (at his television debut) and Andrea Barbato.
- Oceano Canada (Ocean Canada) – reportage (posthumous) by Ennio Flaiano; one of the few work for the television of the great writer.
- Nascita di una formazione partigiana (Birth of a partisan band) – docufiction by Ermanno Olmi and Corrado Stajano, about the story of the partisan band Itaia libera, led by Duccio Garimberti.
- La violenza e la pietà (Violence and pity) – reportage by Brando Giordani about the restoration of Michelangelo's Pietà after the Laszlo Toth attack.
- Un caso di coscienza (A case of conscience) - enquiry by Enzo Biagi about the troubling questions of politic and history.
- La parola ai giudici (The word to the judges) - Inquiry into judicial system in Italy and abroad, care of Mario Cervi, carried out in collaboration with a pool of magistrates.
- Parlo, leggo, scrivo (Speaking, reading, writing) – enquiry about Italian language, care of Tullio De Mauro and Umberto Eco.

==== Entertainment ====
- Pulcinella ieri e oggi (Pulcinella yesterday and today) by Paolo Heusch; Franco Zeffirelli and Eduardo De Filippo talk about the Pulcinella character.
- E ora dove sono? (Where are they now?) – interview by famous writers to former stars of entertainment and sport.
- L’arte di far ridere (Art of making laugh) – by Alessandro Blasetti, enquiry about conicity; 2 series.

== Ending this year ==
- Orizzonti della scienza e della tecnica.
- I ragazzi di padre Tobia

== Deaths ==
- 26 September, Anna Magnani, actress, 65.
- 28 October: Sergio Tofano, actor, 87
