= 1966 in Italian television =

This is a list of Italian television related events from 1966.

== Events ==
- The RAI technical commission chooses, for the color telecasts, the German system PAL, preferring it to the French SECAM and the American NTSC. Nevertheless, for political and commercial reasons, the definitive choice of PAL and the effective start of the color programs will be delayed till 1977.
- January 6: Gianni Morandi wins La prova del nove (1965 edition of Canzonissima) with "Non son degno di te".
- January 29: Domenico Modugno and Gigliola Cinquetti win the 1966 Sanremo festival with Dio come ti amo. The final evening of the contest is the most seen TV show of the year, with 21.300.000 viewers.
- February 7.: Rai Sudtirol, the RAI channel for the German speaking minority living in South Tyrol, begins broadcasting on the frequencies of RAI 2. Because of tensions between the Italian government and South-Tyrolean nationalists, Silvius Magnago, president of the Bolzano province, refuses to inaugurate the new channel with a greeting to the viewers.
- November 4: flood of the Arno. RAI, with its news programs and in-depth magazine, provide a testimony on the catastrophe that is still valuable today.
- December 24.: in Naples, start of the first Italian cable station, Telediffusione Italiana Telenapoli. It broadcasts advertising announcements to television sets placed in supermarkets and public places.
- According to a Radiocorriere’s poll, the best shows of the year for the critics are Le inchieste del commissario Maigret, Francesco d'Assisi and Per Firenze. The audience votes instead choose the matches of the 1966 FIFA World Cup, the film I Confess (broadcast as a tribute to the Montgomery Clift's death) and Dario Niccodemi's plays La nemica and La maestrina.

== Debuts ==
=== Drama ===
- Teatro inchiesta – cycle of tv-dramas about episodes of the contemporary history, lasted till 1973. It’s inaugurated by Tullio Kezich’s The Fuchs affair.

=== Serials ===
- United States - The Addams family

=== Variety ===
- Settevoci (seven voices) – four seasons, This mix of quiz and music show, originally thought as a filler for the Sunday afternoon, gets a huge success and leads to popularity the novice host Pippo Baudo and many young singers.
- National Trophy Rapallo Davoli – six seasons. Musical contest, reserved to singers and groups of beat music.

=== Actualities and documentaries ===
- Orizzonti della scienza e della tecnica (Science and technique horizons) – seven seasons, show of popular science.
- Zoom – magazine of cultural current affairs, hosted by Andrea Barbato.

== Television shows ==
=== Dramas ===
- La fantarca (The fantastic ark) – by Vittorio Cottafavi; libretto by Giuseppe Berto (from his novel); music by Roman Vlad. It's a rare example of opera realized expressly for the television. The legend of the Noah's ark is transposed into a dystopic future, but leaving a lot of space for humor and satire.
- Corruzione al palazzo di giustizia (Corruption in the courthouse) – by Ottavio Spadaro, from the Ugo Betti’s drama, with Tino Buazzelli.

=== Miniseries ===
==== Mystery ====
- Quinta colonna (Fifth column) - by Vittorio Cottafavi, from The ministry of fear, by Graham Greene, with Raoul Grassilli.
- Melissa – by Daniele D’Anza, with Rossano Brazzi (debuting in television), Aroldo Tieri, Turi Ferro and Massimo Serato. Remake of the English TV mystery by Francis Durbridge.
- France - Belphegor, or Phantom of the Louvre

==== Period dramas ====
- Madame Curie – by Guglielmo Morandi, with Ileana Ghione in the title role and Raoul Grassilli as Pierre Curie, from the Irene Curie’s memories; 3 episodes.
- Il conte di Montecristo (The count of Montecristo) – by Edmo Fenoglio, with Andrea Giordana and Giuliana Lojodice. This version of the Dumas’ masterpiece, with an excellent cast of stage actors, gets a wide audience and makes the twenty-years old Giordana a star. The innovative Fengolio's direction, with an intensive use of extreme close-up, instead, causes some irony by the critics.
- La coscienza di Zeno ( Zeno's conscience) – by Daniele D’Anza, from the Italo Svevo’s novel, adapted by Tullio Kezich; with a remarkable performance of Alberto Lionello in the title role.
- Oblomov – by Claudio Fino, from the Ivan Goncharov’s novel, with Alberto Lionello, Nando Gazzolo and Giuliana Lojodice; 4 episodes.
- Francesco d'Assisi – by Liliana Cavani, with Lou Castel as Francisof Assisi and Giancarlo Sbragia as his father, Pietro di Bernardone. The saint is here seen as a forerunner of the youth protest in the Sixties. First example of Italian TV-movie, produced both for television and cinemas.
- Luisa Sanfelice – by Leonardo Cortese, from the Dumas’ novel, with Lydia Alfonsi in the title role; period drama set in the time of the Parthenopean republic.
- Il re (The king) – by Silverio Blasi, script by Giorgio Prosperi. Biopic about the abdication of Charles Albert of Sardinia (played by Massimo Girotti).

==== For children ====
- Avventure di mare e di costa (Sea and shore adventures) – by Giorgio Moser, from Robert Louis Stevenson’s Island Nights' Entertainments and The ebb tide, with Marco Guglielmi.
- I legionari dello spazio (The space legionnaires) – by Italo Alfaro, space-opera for kids.

=== Variety ===
- Camera 22– cabaret. The brothers Raffaele and Mario Pisu (an entertainer and a serious stage actor) ironize about their different careers.
- I due nel sacco (The two in the bag) – variety show with Franco and Ciccio.
- Il signore ha suonato? (Has sir rang?) – variety show with Gino Bramieri.
- Tigre contro tigre (Tiger vs. Tiger) – variety show, about the rivalry between cinema and television, with Gino Bramieri and Marisa Del Frate.
- Johnny sera (Evening Johnny) – variety with Johnny Dorelli. The showman plays the clumsy thief Dorellik, a Diabolik's parody,
- Palcoscenico musicale (Musical stage) – show about the history of the musical theatre, hosted by Lauretta Masiero.
- Carta bianca (White paper) – one-woman show with Anna Proclemer, renowned drama actress, who assumes the unusual role of the soubrette; written by Enno Flaiano.
- Scala reale (Royal flush) – name of the 1966 edition of Canzonissima, won by Claudio Villa with Granada. Peppino De Filippo, also presenter, plays the muddler Pappagone in some farcical sketches and conquers the public, notwithstanding the slating of the critics. The show introduces a "battle" with the young beat and ye-ye singers opposing the old generation of neapolitan and traditional italian melodic style. Notable performances by Dalida, Gene Pitney, Sandie Shaw, Françoise Hardy and the illusionist Silvan.
- Io, Gigliola (I, Gigliola) – in 3 episodes; by Silviero Blasi, with Gigliola Cinquetti.
- Incontro con Luigi Tenco (Meeting with Luigi Tenco). Few months before his suicide, the song singer-writer discusses about music and society with an audience of young people and with the friends Lucio Dalla and Ornella Vanoni.
- Giochi in famiglia (Family games) – quiz, hosted by Mike Bongiorno; the competitors are entire families rather than single persons.
- Giocagiò – show for baby, Italian version of the English show Playschool

=== News and educational ===
- Per Firenze (Florence: days of destruction) – documentary by Franco Zeffirelli about the 1966 Flood of the Arno river.
- Giorgio Strehler, il mestiere del teatro (The craft of theatre) – by Gilberto Tofano; documentary about Giorgio Strehler, with interviews and shooting of the rehearsal for the Henry VI trilogy.
- Quinto: non uccidere (Fifth: Thou shalt not murder) – enquiry by Gianni Bisiach about the capital punishment in the world; two episodes.
- Corrida! – documentary about bullfighting by Marco Ferreri and Luigi Malerba.
- Un’ora con Martin Luther King (An hour with Martiln Luther King) – interview by Ruggero Orlando.

== Ending this year ==
- La fiera dei sogni
- Studio Uno
- Telescuola
- La trottola
- Le avventure di Laura Storm.
- Giovanna la nonna del corsaro nero

== Deaths ==
- April 28: Gilberto Govi, (80), comic actor.

== See also ==
- List of Italian films of 1966
