= 1957 in Italian television =

This is a list of Italian television related events from 1956.

== Events ==
- RAI extends television broadcasting to 6 hours by day, and 11 hours on Sunday.
- 3 February. With the first airing of Carosello, (see below) advertising is introduced to Italian television. The show is inaugurated by an educational short about car driving, sponsored by Shell and played by the sports journalist Giovanni Canestrini.
- 9 February: Claudio Villa and Nunzio Gallo win the 1957 Sanremo Music Festival, hosted by Nunzio Filogamo, with Corde della mia chitarra. Despite the victory, Villa is criticized for the excessive protagonism and for a resounding wrong note, broadcast on Eurovision.
- 25 March: RAI broadcasts on Eurovision the signing of the Treaty of Rome.
- 16 May. Foundation of TVL (Televisione Libera), presided by Gian Vittorio Figari, which aimed to create a commercial television in Milan. Involved in In this project were the American William A. Berns, manager of RCA and NBC, and the controversial businessman Umberto Ortolani. The firm performs (illegally) the first test broadcastings by an Italian private television, on the UHF band, which was not used by RAI.
- 8 September. In the encyclical Miranda prorsus, Pope Pius XII expresses the Catholic Church’s views regarding to modern mass media. About television, the Pope shows interest but also concern. He asks for a strict control by the civil authorities on its content.
- 19 December. In Rome, RAI inaugurates the Via Teulada Production Center, with 6 studios; the core of the firm moves definitively from Turin to the capital.
- December 31: Images from the sky is the first show broadcast simultaneously in all ten Eurovision member countries. Italy contributes with a recital of operatic arias, performed by Maria Callas from RAI auditorium in Rome.

== Debuts ==
- Carosello (Carousel) – advertising show, aired daily between the news and the prime time; it consists of a series of two minutes film (usually comical sketches or cartoons), ending with the slogan of the sponsor, and often realized anonymously by renowned directors, as Luciano Emmer and Ermanno Olmi. For twenty years, it is one of the TV show most loved by the public (moreover by the childish one) and sees the presence as testimonials of almost all the most famous Italian showmen, from Eduardo De Filippo to Dario Fo.

=== Variety ===
- Telematch – game show, hosted by Enzo Tortora, Silvio Noto and Renato Tagliani; two seasons. It includes, for the first time in Italy, two segments not shot in studio: The mysterious object, from the square of a village, and The arm and the mind, cultural and athletic test from a gym, with the presence of famous sportsmen.
- Il musichiere – musical game show, Italian version of Name that tune; directed by Antonello Falqui, written by Garinei and Giovannini, hosted by Mario Riva. The program gets huge popularity, not only for the game but also for the presence as guest stars of the biggest names of the show business and of the sport, not only Italians, from Gary Cooper to Coppi and Bartali. After three seasons, the show is deleted because the sudden Mario Riva's death.
- Zürich festival of the Italian song; 11 editions.

=== News and educational ===
- La macchina per vivere (The machine for living) – program of popular medicine, by Anna Maria Di Giorgio; 2 seasons.
- Ritratto d’attore (Portrait of an actor) – cinema magazine by Fernaldo Di Giammatteo; 2 seasons.

=== For children ===
In 1957, the “TV of the kids”, the shows for the youngest ones broadcast in the afternoon, gets the first successes.

- Zurlì, mago del giovedì (Zurlì, the Thursday magician) – show for children from the Milan Piccolo Teatro, with Cino Tortorella and Giancarlo Cobelli. Tortorella resumes the Zurlì character for the Zecchino d'oro.
- United States - The adventures of Rin-tin-tin
- Avventure in libreria (Adventures at the bookshop) – books magazine, hosted by Luigi Lunari.

== Television shows ==
- Viaggio nella valle del Po : alla ricerca di cibi genuini (Trip in the Po Valley: looking for genuine foods) – gastronomical reportage in 12 episodes, directed and hosted by Mario Soldati. While the Italian intellectuals flaunt, generally, distrust for the television, Soldati shows the potentialities of the new media, using the cuisine as a way to investigate the rural Italy.

=== Drama ===
- Othello – traduced by Salvatore Quasimodo and directed by Claudio Fino, with Vittorio Gassmann, Salvo Randone and Anna Maria Ferrero.
- Medea – by Euripides, directed and interpreted by Sarah Ferrati, with Ivo Garrani and Annibale Ninchi.
- The lady of the camellias by Alexandre Dumas fils, directed by Daniele D’Anza, with Lea Padovani and Tino Carraro.
- Ma non è una cosa seria (But it's nothing serious) – by Luigi Pirandello, directed by Daniele D’Anza, with Gianni Santuccio, Diana Torrieri and Sergio Tofano; a playboy falls in love with the woman with whom he has contracted a sham marriage.
- Home at Seven by Robert C. Sheriff, directed by Silverio Blasi, with Tino Carraro.
- The suicide club by Giacomo Vaccari, from the Robert Louis Stevenson's short story, with Leonardo Cortese and Paolo Carlini.

=== Period dramas ===
- Orgoglio e pregiudizio (Pride and prejudice) by Daniele D’Anza, from the Jane Austen’s novel, in five chapters; with Virna Lisi, on her TV debut (Lizzie Bennet), Franco Volpi (Darcy), Enrico Maria Salerno (Wickham) and Sergio Tofano (Mr. Bennet).
- Jane Eyre by Anton Giulio Majano, from the Charlotte Brontë’s novel, in five chapters; with Ilaria Occhini (Jane Eyre) and Raf Vallone (Rochester).
- Piccolo mondo antico (The little world of the Past), by Silverio Biasi, from the Antonio Fogazzaro’s novel, in five chapters; with Paola Borboni, Carla Del Poggio and Renato De Carmine. First RAI period drama from an Italian novel.
- Romanzo di un giovane povero (Story of a poor young man) by Silverio Blasi, from the Octave Feuillet’s novel about the ordeal of a young decayed nobleman, in four chapters; with Paolo Carlini and Lea Padovani.
- Tessa la ninfa fedele (The constant nymph) by Mario Ferrero, from the Margaret Kennedy’s novel about the tragic love between a musician and a lassie, in four chapters; with Alberto Lupo and Elena Cotta.

=== Variety ===
- Volti e voci della fortuna (Faces and voices of the luck) – musical contest bound to the New Year lottery, hosted by Enzo Tortora and Silvio Noto, won by Aurelio Fierro with Scapricciatello. It is considered an early version of Canzonissima (also if a similar show had been already aired, only by radio, in 1956, under the title Le canzoni della fortuna, The luck's song).
- Cetravolante, directed by Vito Molinari, with the Quartetto Cetra.
