= 1971 in Italian television =

This is a list of Italian television related events from 1971.

== Events ==
- In 1971, RAI gets enormous public successes (Il segno del comando, E le stelle stanno a guardare, Canzonissima) and releases a miniseries in European co-production, shot by directors such as Rossellini, Rossi and Castellani. However, the firm is increasingly criticized for its poor management and the delay in the use of the color. It begins to suffer from competition with the foreign televisions channels of Switzerland and Yugoslavia.
- January 6: Massimo Ranieri wins Canzonissima with Vent’anni.
- February 27: Nada and Nicola Di Bari win the Sanremo music festival with Il cuore è uno zingaro.
- May 6: In Yugoslavia, TV Koper-Capodistria, aimed at the Italian minority in Slovenia, begins to broadcast. Its signal is picked up also in Italy, from Friuli to Marche. Later its broadcoasting area covers the whole country. The new channel has limited technical facilities, but broadcasts in PAL color (six years in advance on RAI). For this, it is welcomed by the Italian public and becomes a serious competitor for the state television, particularly in the broadcast of sport events.
- May 24: the cable television Telediffusione Italiana TeleNapoli makes the first color broadcast on Italy, received only in four Neapolitan cafes equipped with the appropriate sets. In the same year, Telediffussione shots in color all of Cantagiro's stages.
- July 27: RAI refuses to broadcast the scheduled interview Pier Paolo Pasolini by Enzo Biagi, for the program 3 B facciamo l’appello. At the time, Pasolini is in on trial for press crimes, as former director-in-chief of Lotta Continua. The show will be broadcast only four years later, after Pasolini's death.

== Debuts ==
=== Serials ===
- All'ultimo minuto (Last minute) – 3 season, directed by Ruggero Deodato; medium-length thrillers (30 minutes) about ordinary people involved in dramatic situations.

=== News ===
- Nord chiama Sud, Sud chiama Nord (North calls South, South calls North) – magazine broadcast simultaneously from the Milan and Naples studios.

== Television shows ==
=== Drama ===
- Bernadette Devlin – by Silvio Maestranzi; with Anna Bonasso in the title role.
- La signora delle camelie (The lady of the camellias, from the Dumas son's drama) – by Vittorio Cottafavi, script by Maria Bellonci, with Rossella Falk in the title role.
- Tre donne (Three women) – a cycle of three TV dramas, directed by Alfredo Giannetti and all played by Anna Magnani. The great actress debuts on TV, getting a personal success, after a decades of relative decline. The three movies tell a history of Italy in feminine key, from the First world war (La sciantosa, The singer, with Massimo Ranieri) to the Resistance (1943 un incontro, 1943, a meeting, with Enrico Maria Salerno) to the boom (L’automobile, The car, with Vittorio Caprioli).
- Oltre il duemila (Beyond 2000) – two science-fiction drama (The factory of man, The computer) by Piero Nelli.
- Antigone – by Sophocles, directed by Vittorio Cottafavi, with Adriana Asti in the title role and Raoul Grassilli as Creon, shot among the ancient temples in Paestum; the director tries to bring in television the methods of the epic theater.
- The house of Bernarda Alba, by Federico Garcia Lorca, directed by Daniele D’Anza, with Sarah Ferrati and Adriana Asti.
- Personale di Paddy Chayfesky (Tribute to Paddy Chayfesky – directed by Emilio Bruzzo; it includes Marty, (with Renzo Palmer), The big deal (with Gianrico Tedeschi) and The mother (with Elsa Merlini).
- Doppio gioco (Double cross) – thriller by Robert Thomas, directed by Anton Giulio Majano, with Marina Malfatti and Ugo Pagliai. A Parisian high society wife tries to get rid of her wasteful husband; it is the beginning of a dizzying series of deceptions and twists.

==== Experimental ====
- La sostituzione (The replacement) – science-fiction drama, directed by Franco Brogi Taviani (brother of Paolo and Vittorio).
- Interno giorno (Interno giorno) – chamber drama by Maurizio Ponzi, set in a prison cell.
- Olimpia agli amici (Olimpia for the friends) by Adriano Aprà, with Olimpia Carrisi; a young mother and her family must face the impending death of their female child.
- L’inchiesta – by Gianni Amico, with Claudio Camaso and Paolo Bonacelli; mystery set in a psychiatric asylum.

==== Comedy ====
- The nigh of the match by Denis Costanduros, directed by Marcello Baldi, with Antonio Fattorini and Loretta Goggi; the cheerful life of a young couple is put in crisis by the arrival of their first child.
- Mai di sabato signora Lisistrata (Never the Saturday, Mrs. Lysistata) – by Garinei and Giovannini, inspired by Aristophanes' comedy, directed by Vito Molinari, with Gino Bramieri, Milva and Paolo Panelli.
- Un mandarino per Teo – other musical comedy by Garinei and Giovannini, inspired by Eca De Queiroz's The mandarin, directed by Eros Macchi, with Gino Bramieri, Milva and Arnoldo Foà.

=== Miniserie ===
- Astronave Terra (Spaceship Earth) – by Alberto Negrin; biopic in two episodes about Rachel Carson (played by Edda Albertini). It is one of the first Italian TV shows dealing with ecological topics.
- Dedicato a un bambino (Dedicated to a child) – by Gianni Bongioanni; social drama about the problem children.
- Riuscirà il cav. Papà Ubu? (Will Papa Ubu Esq. Succeed?) – version for kid of Alfred Jarry's cycle of Papa Ubu, played partly by actors (Renzo Palmer, Cochi e Renato), partly by puppets.
- Il segno del comando (The sign of the command) – in five episodes; by Daniele D’Anza, from a script of Giuseppe D’Agata (later adapted in a novel); with Ugo Pagliai, Carla Gravina, Massimo Girotti and Rossella Falk. First Italian fantastic thriller, on the example of French productions as Belphegor. An English scholar, in Rome for a conference, meets the ghost of a woman loved in a previous life and is involved in the chase for a powerful talisman. Thanks to a suggestive direction and a well-conceived plot, the miniseries gets at an unexpected success (fifteen millions viewers) and becomes in the years a cult object.
- Come un uragano (Like a hurricane) – mystery in five episodes; by Silverio Blasi, from Francis Durbridge's Bat out of hell, with Alberto Lupo, Delia Boccardo and Corrado Pani. The last episode is seen by twenty-five million viewers (the best outcome for a mystery in history of Italian television).

==== Period dramas ====
- Socrates – in two episodes; by Roberto Rossellini; first chapter of a biopics’ cycle about the great philosophers.
- I Buddenbrok – by Edmo Fenoglio; in seven episodes, from the Thomas Mann's novel; script by Italo Alighiero Chiusano, partly based to the BBC version of the book; with Paolo Stoppa (Jean), Nando Gazzolo (Tom), Glauco Mauri (Christian), Rina Morelli (Ida) and Valentina Cortese (Gerda). The production is, for the time, sumptuous, with a perfect reconstruction of the Buddenbrookhaus and costumes by the designer Maria De Matteis.
- E le stelle stanno a guardare – by Anton Giulio Majano; in nine episodes, from Cronin's The stars look down; with Giancarlo Giannini and Orso Maria Guerrini.
- Eneide – by Franco Rossi; in seven episodes, from the Virgil's poem the Aeneid; with Giulio Brogi (Aeneas) and Andrea Giordana (Turnus). Three years after L’odissea, Rossi realizes another quality peplum, spectacular (cinematography by Vittorio Storaro, costumes by Luciano Ricceri) but not without cultural depth. Giulio Brogi makes the protagonist a modern character, tormented and divided. The miniseries is later adapted for the big screen.
- Il mulino del Po second series (The mill on the Po) – by Sandro Bolchi, who had already directed the first series in 1963; in four episodes, from the second and third chapter of the Riccardo Bacchelli's trilogy; with Valeria Moriconi, Raoul Grassilli, Ottavia PIccolo and the singer Ornella Vanoni in the character role of a prostitute.
- Vita di Leonardo (The life of Leonardo da Vinci) – in five episodes; by Renato Castellani; with Philippe Leroy in the title role. Docudrama highly spectacular (the lost fresco The battle of Anghiari is reconstructed for the shooting) but historically very accurate. An original idea is the insertion, in the Renaissance scene, of a teller modernly dressed (Giulio Bosetti) expressing the views of the author about the great artist.

=== Serials ===
- Giallo di sera (Evening mystery) – by Guglielmo Morandi. Carlo Giuffrè plays the role of a Swiss police officer.
- Great Britain - UFO

=== Variety ===
- Canzonissima 1971 – directed by Eros Macchi; hosted by Corrado Mantoni and Raffaella Carrà, with the imitator Alighiero Noschese as guest of honor in every show, and won by Nicola Di Bari with Chitarra suona più piano (Guitar, play slower). Raffaella Carrà becomes a star of the little screen, also if her uncovered navel and her “tuca tuca” (a dance politely miming a petting, performed too in couple with Alberto Sordi) arouse some scandal. The show gets twenty-five million viewers, record of the year.
- Come quando fuori piove (As when it's raining outside) and La freccia d’oro (The golden arrow) – game and music shows, broadcast the Sunday evening and hosted respectively by Raffaele Pisu and by Pippo Baudo and Loretta Goggi.
- Speciale per noi (Special for us) – directed by Antonello Falqui. Parody of a popular show for the young ones (Speciale per voi), with four elderly showmen (Aldo Fabrizi, Paolo Panelli, Bice Valori and Ave Ninchi) who do nothing to hide their age.
- Teatro 10 (second season) – directed by Antonello Falqui, hosted by Alberto Lupo, with many Italian and international stars as guest of honor. The show introduces Ike and Tina Turner and James Brown to the Italian public. The ending theme Parole parole parole, sung by Lupo and Mina, becomes a hit.
- Speciale 3 milioni (3 million special) – directed by Giancarlo Nicotra, musical show open air, aimed to the young ones, with the presence, besides the singers, of writers Giuseppe Berto and Erich Segal.
- Tutti insieme (All together) – musical show ideated by Mogol, with Lucio Battisti and the main names of the Italian pop-rock, from Bruno Lauzi to Mia Martini.
- Per un gradino in più (For a step more) – by Marcello Marchesi.
- Stasera sì - show celebrating Quartetto Cetra's thirty years of career.

=== News and educational ===
- Terza B, facciamo l’appello (3B, let's make the roll call) – Enzo Biagi interviews famous personality together with their ancient schoolmates; particularly significant the dialog with Pasolini (see over).
- Dal referendum alla costituzione, ovvero il 2 giugno (From Referendum to the Constitution: 2 June ) and I cavalieri di Malta (The Knights of Malta), - first and only works for television by Vittorio De Sica.The first one forms, with other two plays directed by Sandro Bolchi and Ermanno Olmi, a trilogy of celebrative docudramas aired for the 25th anniversary of the institutional referendum.
- L’ultimo pianeta (The last planet) – in five episodes, by Gianluigi Poli. Enquiry about ecology, introduced by an Allen Ginsberg's poem.
- Destinazione uomo (Destination: the man) – reportage by Piero Angela (debuting in the popular science) about the medicine's new frontiers.

== Ending this year ==
Mille e una sera

== Deaths ==
- 22 January: Cesco Baseggio (73), actor.
- 2 February: Nino Besozzi, (69), actor.
- 27 October: Federico Zardi, (59), playwright and TV author.
