= 1981 in Italian television =

This is a list of Italian television related events from 1981.

== Events ==
=== Rai ===
- February 7: Alice wins the Sanremo festival, hosted by Claudio Cecchetto and Eleonora Vallone, with the song Per Elisa; for the first time in ten years, RAI broadcasts integrally the show. With this edition the festival, after a decline in the Seventies, knows a renewed success both for the record sales and as TV event; the final evening is the most seen show of the year, with 22,7 million spectators.
- March 12: RAI cancels last minute the airing of the documentary AAA offresi; the film, realized by a feminist collective, describes crudely the daily life of a prostitute. The censorious measure, wanted by Mauro Bubbico, president of the Parliamentary Commission of Vigilance on television, is stigmatized by the public opinion. AAA offresi is by now again inedited.
- March 18: the existence of the clandestine masonic lodge Propaganda 2 is revealed; among its objiectives, enounced in the Democratic rebirth plan, there are the privatization of RAI and the liberalization of the private TV channels. Several RAI journalists and functionaries result to be members of the lodge, as the vice president Gianfranco Orsello, the TG1 director Franco Colombo, the radio news director Gustavo Selva and the correspondent from Paris Gino Nebiolo.
- May 13: attempted assassination of Pope John Paul II. A long extraordinary edition of TG2 gives the first and contradictories news about the pontifex's conditions and the attacker's identity, but without showing images of the event, because the RAI cameras have left St. Peter's square few moments before the shooting.
- June 12: Vermicino accident; the little Alfredo Rampi, 6 years old, dies at the bottom of a well, where he had failed three days before. RAI 1 and 2 follow the unsuccessful recovery operation, till its tragic epilogue, with a 36 hours live broadcast (the longest in RAI history), hosted by Piero Badaloni and followed by around 20 million viewers. The event arouses both emotion and controversies; RAI is charged to have made a spectacle out of the suffering.
- July 29: RAI 1 broadcasts live the wedding of Prince Charles and lady Diana Spencer.

=== Private channels ===
In 1981, the private networks become a serious thread for RAI, with an average of 5 million viewers (1,39 for Canale 5 alone) against the 7,8 million ones of the state television. Particularly active is Silvio Berlusconi’s Canale 5, that tries even to snatch the rights to Serie A from RAI, while Angelo Rizzoli’s Primarete indipendente, is overwhelmed by the general crisis of the Rizzoli group.

- March 2: Canale 5 inaugurates Pomeriggio con sentimento (Afternoon with feeling), a daily space aimed to the housewives, with classic romantic movies and soap-operas.
- March 18: the P2 scandal involves the private television too. The two main editors in the field, Angelo Rizzoli and Silvio Berlusconi, and the journalist Maurizio Costanzo, director of the Primarete news program, Contatto, are registered to the lodge.
- June 2: Canale 5 begins airing Dallas; some episodes were already broadcast by RAI 1, with moderate success. The change of channel benefits the serial, that gets very high ratings; in the following years, it becomes the Canale 5’ flagship and a custom phenomenon.
- June 16: Canale 5 broadcasts the first Mundialito des clubs, a friendly tournament among the most illustrious football teams of the world, organized by the network itself.
- July 21: a sentence of the Constitutional Court confirms the RAI monopoly on the national information; the Primarete news program, Contatto, stop broadcasting.
- October 5: the circuit GPE – Telemond, controlled by Mondadori, ceases activity; the local televisions who are part of it enter in the two new national network, Italia Uno and Rete Quattro.

== Debuts ==
=== RAI ===
==== Variety ====
- Blitz – 3 seasons. Interstitial program of the Sunday afternoon, hosted by Gianni Minà and focused on sport and entertainment. In 1984, the show is at the center of a scandal, because of a blasphemy said live by the actor Leopoldo Mastelloni in an interview.
- Mister Fantasy – Musica da vedere (Music to see), variety hosted by Carlo Massarini and Mario Luzzato Fegis, that reveals the music videos (often realized on purpose for the show) to the Italian public; four seasons.
- Lo scatolone, antologia di nuovissimi, nuovi e seminuovi (The big box, anthology of very new, new and almost new ones) – hosted by Claudia Poggiani and Lando Buzzanca; 2 seasons.
- Il sistemone (The big system) – quiz about football history, hosted by Gianni Minà and others: 3 seasons.
- Sotto le stelle (Under the star) – summer show by Gianni Boncompagni, with various hosts, 6 seasons.
- Zim zum zam – show of music and magic, almost devoid of talking, hosted by the illusionist Alexander, 2 seasons.

==== News and educationale ====
- Appuntamento al cinema (Date at the cinema) – review of trailer, for upcoming films; again on air.
- Linea verde (Green line) - magazine about Italian agriculture and natural beauties, hosted by Federico Fazzuoli and later by many other journalists or entertainment personalities; again on air, it has generated various spin-offs.
- Più sani e più belli (Healthier and nicer) - well-being magazine, hosted by Rosanna Lambertucci; 7 editions.
- Quark, viaggi nel mondo della scienza (Travelling in the science world, 7 seasons) and Quark speciale (20 seasons) - the most successful Italian shows of popular science, both hosted by Piero Angela.

==== For children ====
- Direttissima con la tua antenna (Very live from your antenna) – show for children, containing inside cartoon and telefilms, hosted by Marta Flavi and Gianfranco Scancarello

=== Private channels ===
- Bim Bum Bam (Antenna Nord, later Italia Uno and Canale 5) – lasted till 2002, hosted for all the 1980s by Paolo Bonolis, sided by the puppet Uan. The program, started in the Rusconi's Antenna Nord as a simple container of animated films, becomes, after the passage to Fininvest, the most popular show for children of the time. The show includes, besides the cartoons (of which The Smurfs is the most successful), comical sketches and parody fiction.
- Aboccaperta, gli italiani che hanno qualcosa da dire (Open mouth, the Italians with something to say) (TMC) – talk show presented by Gianfranco Funari, moved on RAI 2 since 1984; 8 seasons. The show is characterized, beyond the presence of ordinary people as guests, by heavy tones and verbal brawls incited by the conductor; for this reason, it is considered the first Italian example of trash TV.

==== Canale 5 ====
- Bis – Italian version of the game show Concentration, hosted by Mike Bongiorno; 9 seasons and 2600 episodes (record for an Italian TV quiz).
- Buongiorno Italia – Italian version of Good morning, America, hosted by Marco Columbro, Aba Cercvato and Fiorella Pierobon; 6 editions.
- Domenica con Five, Five time and Pomeriggio con Five – shows for children, with the puppet Five (voiced by Marco Columbro), mascot of Canale 5, Augusto Martelli and Fabrizia Carminati; 4 seasons.

=== International ===
- (United States) Dallas (RAI 1, then Canale 5; see over)
- (United States) Hart to Hart (RAI 2)
- (United States) The Dukes of Hazzard (Canale 5)

== Television shows ==
=== RAI ===
==== Drama ====
- I giochi del diavolo (The devil's games) – cycle of TV-movies, based on six fantastic tales of the Nineteenth Century, chosen by Italo Calvino; the most significant is La Vénus d'Ille, by Mario and Lamberto Bava, from Prosper Mérimée’s tale.
- La giacca verde (The green jacket) – by Franco Giraldi, with Jean-Pierre Cassel, Renzo Montagnani and Senta Berger; from a Mario Soldati’s story. In the second world war, a famous conductor and a modest timpanist exchange their social roles and almost their identities.
- Il padre (The father) – by Giorgio Pressburger, from the Strindberg’s play, with Giorgio Albertazzi.
- Fosca – by Enzo Muzil, from the Igino Ugo Tarchetti's novel, with Claudio Cassinelli and Patrizia Terreno.
- Maria Zef – by Vittorio Cottafavi, from the novel of Paola Drigo, with Renata Chiappino and Siro Angeli; 2 episodes. It's the story (played in Friulian language with Italian subtitles) of a country girl, victim of the misery and of her uncle's abuses.
- Il caso Graziosi (The Graziosi affari) – by Michele Massa, with Jean-Pierre Cassel; the true story of the pianist Arnaldo Graziosi, presumed uxoricidal.
- Accadde a Zurigo (It happened in Zurich) by Gianni Vettorazzi, with Gianni Garko and Carlo Hintermann; true story of a spy battle in Zurich between Italian and Austrian secret services during the First World War.
- Venezia, carnevale, un amore (Venice, the carnival and the love) – by Mario Lanfranchi, ballet film with Carla Fracci and Rudolf Nureyev.
- Chiave di lettura (Reading key) – cycle of six classic plays, shown first in a traditional version (taken from the RAI archives) and then in an experimental one.

==== Miniseries ====
- Illa: punto d’osservazione (Observation point) – by Daniele D’Anza with Stefania Casini and Antonio Casagrande; an airheaded girl, casual witness of a murder, is involved in a spy game bigger than her; 3 episodes.
- Turno di note (Night Shift) by Paolo Poeti, with Rino Cassano and Barbara De Rossi; 3 episodes. Another occasional witness (this time a signalman) investigates a crime.
- Un paio di scarpe per tanti chilometri (A pair of shoes for so many kilometers) - by Alfredo Giannetti, with Fabio Boccanera and Michele Esposito; 3 episodes. The ordeals of two boys escaped from a re-education institute.
- Storia di Anna – by Salvatore Nocita, with Laura Lattuada; 4 episodes. First RAI fiction about drug dependence, it has a realistic mood and a tragic ending by then courageous.

===== Historical dramas =====
- Quell’antico amore (That ancient love) – by Anton Giulio Majano, from the Carlo Laurenzi's novel, with Giuseppe Pambieri, Isabella Goldman and Alida Valli; 5 episodes. The love story between Charles III, Duke of Parma, and Argia Vernaldi.
- Adua (The battle of Adwa) – by Dante Guardamagna, from the Manlio Cancogni's novel, with Carlo Simoni and Ugo Maria Morosi; 5 episodes. The story of two cousins (an army officer and an anarchist) with the First Italo-Ethiopian War as the background.
- Dei miei bollenti spiriti by Sandro Bolchi, from the Gino Pugnetti's novel, with Gianni Vettorazzo and Marina Vlady; a Venetian waiter goes through the war years thinking more about women than historical events.
- I ragazzi di celuloide (Celluloid boys) – by Sergio Sollima, with Massimo Ranieri and Anna Maria Rizzoli, in 3 episodes; the story of some students of the Experimental Center of Cinematography during the war years. It has a sequel in 1984.

===== Bipoics =====
- Don Luigi Sturzo - by Giovanni Fago, biopic with Flavio Bucci in the title role; 3 episodes.
- Vita di Antonio Gramsci (Life of Antonio Gramsci) – by Raffaele Maiello, script by Suso Cecchi D’Amico and Giuseppe Fiori, with Mattia Sbragia in the title role; 4 episodes.
- George Sand – by Giorgio Albertazzi (also actor as Michel de Bourges), with Anna Proclemer in the title role; 4 episodes.
- Fregoli - biopic by Paolo Cavara, with Gigi Prioietti in the title role; 4 episodes.

==== Serials ====
- Tutti insieme tempestosamente (All together with storm) – sticom about an enlarged family, with Rossana Podestà and Nino Castelnuovo.

==== Variety ====
- Tutto compreso (All inclusive) – by Giancarlo Nicotra, with Ezio Greggio and Enrico Beruschi; variety set in a resort, considered a forerunner of the Drive In’s formula.
- Stasera niente di nuovo (Nothing new tonight) – by Romolo Siena; last show in RAI of Raimondo Vianello and Sandra Mondaini, sided by the young soubrette Heather Parisi.
- Telepatria international ovvero niente paura siamo italiani (Telepatria international, or No fear, we are Italians) variety with Renzo Arbore and Luciano De Crescenzo, dealing ironically with the Italian patriotism theme: 3 episodes.
- Tagli, ritagli e frattaglie (Cuts, scraps, offal) - anthology of comic sketches from the RAI archive, hosted by Renzo Arbore. Luciano De Crescenzo and the debuting Lory Del Santo in the role of a sexy secretary.
- Mille milioni (A thousand millions) – musical show with Raffaella Carrà, coproduced by RAI and 4 foreign televisions and shot in 5 world metropolis (Mexico City, Buenos Aires, London, Moscow and Rome).
- Happy circus – music show set in a circus, hosted by Samy Barbot and Liana Orfei.
- Foto finish – variety with the young learners of Vittorio Gassman's Bottega del teatro
- Grand canal, hosted by Corrado Maltoni; the program combines a game with only non-Italian contestants and a parodic soap-opera made following the directions of the audience from home.
- Patatrac – by Gianni Boncompagni, hosted by Franco and Ciccio
- Signori si parte (Gentlemen, let's go) – show of the summer, hosted by Gianfranco D’Angelo.
- Signorina grandi firme – with Carmen Russo, debuting as presenter.
- Te la do io l’America (I give you America) – humorous reportage from the United States by Beppe Grillo.

==== News and educational ====
- È una domenica sera di novembre (It's a November Sunday evening) – documentary by Lina Wertmuller about the 1980 Irpinia earthquake, with an interview to Martin Scorsese.
- Droga, che fare? (What to do about drugs?) – care of Piero Badaloni.
- Vent’anni al 2000 (Twenty years before 2000) – interviews to the main Italian intellectuals by the journalist Alberto Sinigalia.
- Movie movie – program about history of Italian cinema, hosted by Lugi Magni and Ugo Tognazzi.
- Tutto Govi – tribute to Gilberto Govi, fifteen years after his death, care of Vito Molinari.
- Controluce - theatre magazine, hosted by Ottavia Piccolo.
- A grande richiesta (By popular demand) – imaginary interviews to five great philosophers, from Socrates to Nietzche, with text of renowned writers as Umberto Eco.

=== Private channels ===
- Hello Goggi – with Loretta Goggi, first variety produced by Canale 5.

== Ending this year ==
- 3,2,1 ... contatto
- A come agricoltura
- Il buggzzum
- Polvere di stelle
- Il pomofiore
- I sogni nel cassetto
- SuperGulp!
- Il trenino

== Channels ==
=== New channels ===
- VB33

== Deaths ==
- March 21: Paolo Grassi, 61, former RAI president.
- November 22: Andreina Pagnani, 74, actress, female protagonist of Le inchieste del commissario Maigret.
