= 1961 in Italian television =

This is a list of Italian television related events of 1961.

== Events ==
- 6 January - Tony Dallara wins Canzonissima with Romantica; the year before, the singer had won the Sanremo Festival with the same song.
- 18 January – The liberal Novello Papafava and the Christian Democrat Ettore Bernabei are nominated, respectively, for the positions of President and General Director of RAI. Bernabei, a faithful follower of Amintore Fanfani, will be the true master of the estate for thirteen years. At the beginning, his management is inspired to a line of prudent opening, softening the censure and giving space also to professionals (such as Enzo Biagi and Ugo Gregoretti) not aligned with the DC.
- 6 February - The duo Luciano Tajoli and Betty Curtis wins the Sanremo Music Festival with Al di là. However, the contest, presented by Giuliana Calandra, is memorable moreover for the debut of many singers of the youngest generation, “howlers” or singer-songwriters. Adriano Celentano, runner up with 24.000 baci, arouses scandal for having turned the back to the audience in his performance.
- 17 March: centenary of the Unification of Italy. RAI celebrates the event broadcasting, beyond the official ceremonies, Va' pensiero, a recital of lyric arias and texts read by actors, care of Marco Visconti and directed by Anton Giulio Majano.
- 14 April: first connection between RAI and OIRT; the Italian television broadcasts, live from Moscow, the celebrations to Juri Gagarin after the Vostok 1 mission.
- 11 June: Arnaldo Pambianco wins the Giro d'Italia (the "Centenary tour"). For the first time, RAI covered the event in full.
- September: RAI begins the survey of audience and satisfaction ratings, with the method of random telephone interviews; the most watched show of 1961 is Studio Uno, with 13,600,000 viewers.
- 1 October - The socialist Enzo Biagi becomes director of the TV news; he renews the program, giving less space to internal politics and officialdom and more to chronicle and news from the world. This new deal arouses harsh polemics by the right-wing. After a year, Biagi resigns.
- 4 November – The Second channel begins broadcasting. This is the schedule of the first day.

9,05 PM	The war and the victory: special evening about the anniversary of the Italian victory in the first world war (a concert, a documentary and the teleplay The trench, see below)
11 PM	News
11,20 PM	The evil queen, ballet by Birgit Cullberg.

The new channel airs two hours by day (since 9 PM) and is received only by a half of the Italian population.

- 12 November. In the Council of ministers, Guido Gonella and Mario Scelba, exponents of the most conservative wing of DC, attack fiercely the variety shows, Enzo Biagi's TV journal and the Political tribune (see below). They accuse RAI of having “put Togliatti and the ballerinas in the Italian families’ heart.”
- On “Il Verri”, the essay Mike Bongiorno’s phenomenology, by Umberto Eco, is published. The writing, despite its playful tone, is one of the first serious analyses of television as a social phenomenon.

== Debuts ==
=== Serials ===
- Giovanna la nonna del corsaro nero (Giovanna the black corsair's grandmother) – four seasons; directed by Alda Grimaldi, written by Vittorio Metz, with Anna Campori. Cheerful parody of the pirates novels by Emilio Salgari, it was one of the most beloved shows for children of the Sixties; notwithstanding its success, all its tapes were deleted by RAI and now only some amateurish recording survives.

=== Variety ===
- L'amico del giaguaro (The friend of the jaguar) – three seasons; directed by Vito Molinari, hosted by Corrado, with Marisa Del Frate, Gino Bramieri and Raffaele Pisu. Humoristic show, remembered moreover for its parodies of famous movies.
- Chissà chi lo sa? (Who knows who knows?) – seven seasons; quiz show for children, hosted by Febo Conti.
- Studio Uno (Studio One) – four seasons; directed by Antonello Falqui, hosted by Mina (in the second season she was temporarily replaced, because pregnant, by Rita Pavone) sided by Italian and international stars as Don Lurio, the Kessler twins, the Bluebell girls, Lelio Luttazzi and Luciano Salce. It's considered the masterpiece of the Italian TV variety, thanks moreover to the spectacular ballets, performed in minimalist scenography, to the Mina's talent, not only as singer but as entertainer too, and to the numerous guest stars. The Quartetto Cetra’s musical parodies get so much success to be developed in a separate show (The Studio One library).

=== News and educational ===
- Tribuna politica (Political tribune) – political talk show, created after the success of Electoral tribune the previous year, hosted by Jader Jacobelli; in a press conference, a politician faces journalists by various tendencies. The program gives the same space to every party present in the Parliament, the PCI included, and for this reason it is, at the beginning, strongly criticized by the conservatives (see over).

== Television shows ==
=== Drama and comedy ===
- La trincea (The trench) – by Vittorio Cottafavi, from the Giuseppe Dessì’s drama; the life in a trench on the eve of a bloody assault, during the Fourth Battle of the Isonzo.
- The madwoman of Chaillot by Jean Giradoux, directed by Sandro Bolchi, with Sarah Ferrati.
- The prosecuting attorney – historical drama by Fritz Hochwalder, directed by Giacomo Vaccari, with Turi Ferro in the role of Antoine Quentin Fouquier-Tinville.
- L’adorabile Giulio (The adorable Giulio) – musical comedy by Garinei e Giovannini, with Carlo Dapporto and Delia Scala, directed by Eros Macchi, music by Gorni Kramer; a mature actor, impenitent playboy, must face the father’s responsibilities when the adolescent daughter leaves the boarding school.
- La padrona di raggio di luna (The owner of Moonbeam) – musical comedy by Garinei and Giovannini, with Andreina Pagnani and Robert Alda, directed by Eros Macchi, music by Gorni Kramer; the life of a widow is upset when she discovers to have inherited a football player from the husband (the story is inspired by a true fact).
- Racconti dell’italia di ieri (Tales of yesterday’s Italy) – cycle of TV plays, taken from Italian tales of the nineteenth-century. L’alfiere nero (The Black Bishop) by Arrigo Boito, directed by Carlo Lodovici, with Carlo Graziosi, the story of a chess game between a racist white man and a black one, opens the series.

==== Classic theatre ====
- Adelchi – by Alessandro Manzoni, with Vittorio Gassmann; TV direction by Carla Ragionieri; footage of the historical version of the tragedy played and directed by Gassmann in a circus tent for the Italian Popular Theatre.
- Antony and Cleopatra by William Shakespeare, directed by Franco Enriquez, with Gianni Santuccio, Elena Zareschi and Gian Maria Volonté.
- The History of King Henry the Fourth, by William Shakespeare, directed by Sandro Bolchi, with a memorable Tino Buazzelli as Falstaff.
- The broken jug by Heinrich von Kleist, directed by Sandro Bolchi, with Tino Buazzelli.

=== Miniseries ===
- Graziella – by Mario Ferrero, from the Alphonse de Lamartine’s novel, with Ilaria Occhini; in four episodes.
- Il caso Mauritius (The Mauritius affair) – by Anton Giulio Majano, from the Jakob Wasserman’s novel about the consequences of a judiciary error, with Corrado Pani and Raoul Grassilli; in four episodes.

=== Serials ===
- Le pecore nere (The black sheep) – by Gilberto Tofano; cycle of TV-plays about the life of 5 adventurers (Cagliostro, Daniel Boone, Don Juan, Francois Villon and the brigand Giosafatte Talarico), all played by Giorgio Albertazzi.
- Le avventure di un pagliaccio (The adventures of a clown) – for children; with Luisella Nava as the clown Scaramacai, already a star of Carosello.

=== Variety ===
- Giardino d’inverno (Winter Garden) – by Antonello Falqui, hosted by the Quartetto Cetra. The show reveals to the Italian public Henri Salvador and the Kessler Twins and sees the Ornella Vanoni’s debut.
- Canzonissima 1961 – hosted by Sandra Mondaini and Paolo Poli. The show, won by Tony Dallara, with Adriano Celentano as runner up, establishes the success of the “shouters” (Italian version of the rockers).
- Vittorio De Sica racconta (Vittorio De Sica tells). In one of his rare TV experiences, the great actor and director tells to the children some classic fables.
- Tempo di musica (Music time) – by Daniele D’Anza, with Johnny Dorelli and Lea Massari, written by Luciano Salce and Ettore Patti; history of Italy through the songs. The first episode, satirizing the fascism and its wars, arouses angry protests from the extreme right; the following ones are heavily censored, enough to make D’Anza give up the show direction.

=== News and educational ===
- Controfagotto (Contrabassoon) – directed and hosted by Ugo Gregoretti; lifestyle magazine, describing the Italy of the boom in a politely satirical tone.
- Il giudice (The judge) – by Enzo Biagi, at his TV debut; reportage about the story of David Rubinwvicz, a Jewish child Holocaust victim.
