= 1962 in Italian television =

This is a list of Italian television related events from 1962.

== Events ==
- 6 January: Tony Dallara wins Canzonissima for the second time in a row, with Bambina bambina.
- 18 February: the duo Claudio Villa and Domenico Modugno wins the Sanremo Music Festival, hosted by Renato Tagliani, with Addio, addio; the final evening of the show is seen by 13,200.000 viewers. Quando, quando, quando by Tony Renis, ranked just fourth, gets later an international success.
- 5 April; RAI shows live the fall of the last rock wall at the Great St Bernard Tunnel.
- 29 June : Adriano Celentano, with Stai lontana da me (cover of Tower of strength) wins the first Cantagiro edition.
- 23 July. First trans-Atlantic satellite transmission by satellite Telstar (presented for Italy by Luca di Schiena). At 7:40, PM the Italian viewers see live form images of American life and pieces of a John F. Kennedy’s press conference. At 10:50 PM Eurovision answers with a twenty-minutes show for America; RAI contributes with some views of Rome by night, the Sistine Chapel Choir, an aria from Tosca sung by Ferruccio Tagliavini and images of fishermen sailing from Mazara del Vallo.
- 11 October : RAI broadcasts live the opening of the Second Vatican Council. The ceremony is retransmitted in all Europe and, by satellite, in USA and Canada.
- 29 November. RAI censures a Dario Fo and Franca Rame’s satirical sketch for Canzonissima. It depicts a building contractor cynically uncaring of his workers’ security, This is considered inappropriate, because of an ongoing trade union dispute in the construction industry. The two artists refuse to postpone the sketch's broadcasting and leave the popular transmission as a protest. In the following weeks, many other actors (such as Walter Chiari and Gino Bramieri) refuse, for professional solidarity, to replace the couple, who will be missing from television for fifteen years.
- L’amico del giaguaro is the most seen program of the year, with 14,7 million viewiers.

== Debuts ==
- Teletris – quiz inspired by the Tic-tac-toe game.

=== News and educational ===
- Il processo alla tappa (The stage on trial) – host by Sergio Zavoli. The show follows the Giro d’Italia, stage by stage, with special attention to the human side of the race. Started in radio in 1958, it lasts till now (but with a long break from 1970 to 1998) and must be remembered also for its technical innovations, like the moviola and the interviews to the racing cyclists.
- Rotocalco televisivo (TV magazine) – current affairs program, directed by Enzo Biagi, lasted till 1968 and, in 2007, briefly revived by Biagi himself, few months before his death. It denounced, for the first time on Italian television, the power of the Mafia and the omertà culture, with the Gianni Bisiach reportage Report from Corleone.
- Libri per tutti (Books for everybody) – literary column, host by Luigi Silori.

=== Serials ===
- Racconti dell’italia d’oggi (Tales of today's Italy) – serie of TV-movie, care of Raffaele La Capria, adapted from tales of the contemporary Italian writers. The most appreciated are the two ones directed by Vittorio Cottafavi: World is a jail, from Guglielmo Petroni, about the Italian resistance, and The woodcutting, from Carlo Cassola, with Gian Maria Volonté.
- Vivere insieme (Living together) – cycle of tv-play by various authors about the problems of family life, followed by a debate; lasted till 1970.
- United States - The twilight zone
- United States - Bonanza

== Television shows ==
=== Drama ===
- Operazione Vega (The mission of the Vega) – by Vittorio Cottafavi, from a radio play by Friederich Durremat. Set on the planet Venus in a distant future, it's really an allegory about the cold war and the risk of a global conflict and a daring experiment of TV science-fiction aimed to the adult ones.
- Battono alla porta (They are knocking at the door) – rare case of opera realized expressly for television, music by Riccardo Malipiero, libretto by Dino Buzzati, directed by Sandro Bolchi.
- Filumena Marturano written and interpreted by Eduardo De Filippo, with Regina Bianchi.
- White nights, from Fyodor Dostoevsky’s short story, by Vittorio Cottafavi, with Monica Vitti and Giulio Bosetti.

=== Miniseries ===
- I giacobini (The jacobins) – by Edmo Fenoglio, from Federico Zardi’s drama, in six episodes. It's an historically accurate reconstruction of the French revolution, re-evaluating the figures of Robespierre (the French-Italian actor Serge Reggiani) and Saint-Just (the newcomer Warner Bencivenga), traditionally seen as bloodthirsty fanatics. The series, thanks also to the excellent cast, got a huge critic and public success, but its tapes in the RAI archives have been lost and now only an amateurish record of the sound survives.
- Una tragedia Americana (An American tragedy) – by Anton Giulio Majano, from Theodore Dreiser’s novel., with Werner Bencivenga, Giulana Lojodice and Virna Lisi. It's very appreciated by the audience and gets the highest approval rating of the year, while the critics scold Majano for having reduced the Dreiser's social novel to an edifying soap-opera.
- Più rosa che giallo (More romance than crime stories) – by Alberto Bonucci, on seven episodes.

=== Variety ===
- Canzonissima 62. This edition of the traditional contest of songs, won by Tony Renis with Quando quando quando, is now remembered moreover for its political meaning. The two hosts, Dario Fo and Franca Rame, try a kind of show more daring and less evasive than usual. Their satirical sketches about taboo topics, as the mafia and the work accidents, get appreciations but also protests, questions to the House and censures by RAI. After the leaving of the couple (see over), the show goes on without a host, before being entrust to Tino Buazzelli and, for the final episode, to Corrado Maltoni.
- Rinaldo in campo (Rinaldo takes the field) – musical comedy in three episodes about the Expedition of the Thousand, by Garinei and Giovannini, directed by Carla Ragionieri, with Domenico Modugno (author also of the music), Delia Scala and Franco e Ciccio. Already a success in theatre, it is the second most viewed show of the year, with 14,600,000 viewers.
- Leggerissimo (Very light) - musical show with Gorni Kramer, Liana Orfei and Gino Bramieri.
- Stasera i Cetra (The Cetra tonight ) – the show retraces the Quartetto Cetra’s progress.
- Alta pressione (High pressure) – first Italian TV musical show aimed explicitly to the young people and first success of the Secondo Canale, hosted by Walter Chiari and Renata Mauro.
- Il signore delle ventitré (The 11 PM gentleman) – variety hosted by Ernesto Calindri, set in a night-club where Italian and international stars perform.
- Caccia al numero (Hunt for the number) – quiz hosted by Mike Bongiorno, Italian version of Concentration.

=== News and educational ===
- La lunga strada del ritorno (The long return road), directed by Alessandro Blasetti, script by Alfonso Gatto.. – Documentary film in three episodes about the Italian soldiers during World War II, alternating archive footage and interviews to Italian veterans (among them, the writer Mario Rigoni Stern). Become over time a very precious historical document, in 2017 it has been presented to the 74th Venice International Film Festival in a restored version.
- Storia del terzo Reich (History of the Third Reich) – directed by Liliana Cavani at her first full-length film; 4 episodes.

== Ending this year ==
- Campanile sera

== See also ==
- List of Italian films of 1962
