= 1975 in Italian television =

This is a list of Italian television related events of 1975.

== Events ==
=== RAI ===
- January 6: Wess and Dori Ghezzi win the last edition of Canzonissima with Un corpo e un'anima (A body a soul). The show ends its cycle on the sly; the final evening is not aired because a strike and the results of the contest are announced briefly by the news program.
- March 1: Gilda wins the Sanremo Festival, presented by Mike Bongiorno ad Sabina Ciuffini, with Ragazza del sud (Southern girl). It is considered the weakest edition of the contest, boycotted by the record companies and almost ignored by RAI, which broadcasts only the final evening.
- April 14: RAI reform is promulgated; the estate's control passes from government to parliament.
- May 14 the Parliamentary Committee for Supervision of Radio and TV Services settles downs; its first president is the DC Giacomo Sedati.
- May 23: the socialist Beniamino Finocchiaro becomes RAI president; the DC Michele Principe general director.
- August: RAI begins the technical trials of colour broadcastings, with the PAL system.
- September 24: RAI broadcasts Federico Fellini's La dolce vita, 15 years after its release in the theatres. The movie, till then judged too outrageous for the Italian public, had been already aired by the major European televisions.

=== Private Channels ===
In 1975, besides the already numerous cable TV, the private channels by air spread in Italy. They operate with little means and out of legality; yet, many Italian praetors acknowledge them the right to broadcast.

- March: Telebiella, the pioneer of Italian cable televisions, stop to broadcast.

==== List of private channels born in 1975 ====
- in Livorno, TVL Radio Televisione Libera (later Telelivorno), founded by the businessman Paolo Romani and the 24 years old journalist Marco Taradash (15 January).
- in Milan, Telealto Milanese, founded by Renzo Villa and Enzo Tortora, (April 10). It gets a noticeable success, thanks to the presence of RAI stars, as Tortora, Cino Tortorella and Walter Chiari, and is the first private channel to air a news program, but declines after the Tortora√ leaving.
- In Cologno Monzese, Telelombardia (again on air)
- In San Lazzaro di Savena, Video Bologna (April 10, by cable).
- In Ragusa, Tele Iblea, the first Sicilian private air channel, (February 10).
- In Catania, Teleetna (again on air).
- in Cagliari, Videolina, the main Sardinian television, again existing (June 19).

== Debuts ==
- L’ospite delle due (The 2 PM guest) – first talk show in Italian television, aired the Sunday evening, hosted by Luciano Rispoli; 2 seasons.
- La fata Moena – annual show from Moena for the final evening of the Disco Neve; 4 editions.
- Il pomofiore (The fruit-flower) – amateur show hosted on Telealto Milanese by Enzo Tortora, then on Antenna 3 by Lucio Flauto; 6 seasons. The contenders get by the public flowers (for the good performances) or fruits (for the bad ones). It is the first success show of the Italian private television.

=== For children ===
- Il dirigibile (The airship) – show for children, hosted by Toni Santagata and Mal, with a cast mixed of actors and puppets; 5 seasons.
- Grisù - cartoon by Nino and Toni Pagot; 2 seasons.

== Shows of the year ==
=== Drama ===
- L’amico delle donne (The women's friend) – by Davide Montemurri, from Alexandre Dumas fils.’s play, with Carlo Giuffrè and Giuliana Lojodice. A man of the world, expert of female psychology, solves the conjugal problems of an aristocratic couple.
- I racconti di Ernest Hemigway – by Gian Pietro Calasso, with Duilio Del Prete and Roberto Chevalier, from three Hemingway's short stories (The Capital of the World, The undefeated, The killers)
- Tommaso d’Acquino (Thomas Aquinas) – biopic by Leandro Castellani, written by Diego Fabbri,
- Processo per l'uccisione di Raffaele Sonzogno giornalista romano (Trial for the murder of Raffaele Sonzogno, Roman journalist) – by Alberto Negrin, with Ferruccio Amendola and Antonio Guidi, inspired by a true crime happened in Rome in 1875 and never fully clarified; 2 episodes.
- Storie in una stanza (Stories in a room) – cycle of experimental medium-length films, by different authors and casts, characterized by an absolute unity of time and space.
- Tre enigmi (Three enigmas) – cycle of three Italian mysteries, by various directors (L’uomo con gli occhiali a specchio, L’uomo dei venti, with Orso Maria Guerrini, and Un uomo curioso, from a Piero Chiara's novel, with Gabriele Ferzetti).

=== Miniseries ===
- Una città in fondo alla strada (The town at the end of the road) – by Mauro Severino, with Massimo Ranieri and Giovanna Carola; 5 episodes. The adventures of a boy and a girl from South Italy, looking for a better tomorrow in Milan.
- La guerra al tavolo della pace (The war at the peace desk) – by Massimo Sani and Paolo Gazzara, written by Italo Alighiero Chiusano, with Gianni Bonagura (Churchill), Virgino Gazzolo (Roosvelt) and Renzo Montagnani (Stalin); 5 episodes. Reconstruction, historically accurate, of the 5 main Allied World War II conferences.
- Il marsigliese – gangsters drama by Giacomo Battiato, with Marc Porel and Renato Mori; 3 episodes.

==== Period dramas ====
- Orlando furioso – by Luca Ronconi, from Ludovico Ariosto's poem and Edoardo Sanguineti's play, with Massimo Foschi (Roland), Ottavia Piccolo (Angelica), Luigi Diberti (Ruggiero), Edmonda Aldini (Bradamante), Michele Placido and Mariangela Melato, photography by Vittorio Storaro; 5 episodes. The serial, shot in Villa Farnese, does not repeat the success of the theatre version, set up by the same Ronconi. It is judged too experimental and intellectual by most of the public and the critics.
- Marco Visconti – by Anton Giulio Majano, from the Tommaso Grossi's novel, with Raf Vallone in the title role, Gabriele Lavia and Pamela Villoresi; 6 episodes. Set in the Middle-age Milan, it tells the tragic love of a warlord for his cousin's young betrothed.
- Murat – biopic by Silverio Blasi, with Orso Maria Guerrini in the title role; 3 episodes.
- La bufera (The storm) – from the Edoardo Calandra's novel, directed by Edmo Fenoglio, with Marilù Tolo, Gabriele Lavia and Claudio Gora; 3 episodes. An historical fresco set during the Napoleon's Italian campaign
- Il lungo viaggio (The long travel) – by Franco Giraldi, from the Fjodor Dostoevsky's “ministerial novels” (The double, Notes from underground, A nasty story), with Flavio Bucci, Ottavia Piccolo and Glauco Mauri; 4 episodes.
- Ritratto di signora (The Portrait of a lady) – by Sandro Sequi, from the Henry James’ novel, with Ileana Ghione and Paolo Graziosi; 4 episodes.
- Romanzo popolare italiano (Italian pulp fiction) by Ugo Gregoretti; cycle of fictions revisiting the works of five Italian popular novelists (from Francesco Domenico Guerrazzi to Luciano Zuccoli) with the method of the distancing effect.

==== Comedy ====
- Giandomenico Fracchia, sogni proibiti di uno di noi (Giandomenico Fracchia, forbidden dreams of one of us) - comedy by Antonello Falqui, with Paolo Villaggio and Ombretta Colli; 4 episodes. Villaggio plays one of his typical characters, a timid and cowardly clerk who seeks refuge in fantasy.
- Quello della porta accanto (The next door's guy) – comedy with musical numbers by Stefano De Stefani, with Ric e Gian as two neighbours of opposite characters, a quiet accountant and a playboy; 5 episodes.
- Il gran simpatico, by Giuseppe Recchia, script by Marcello Marchesi, with Enzo Cerusico and Gianrico Tedeschi, 4 episodes. A naïve plumber and his family have to face the temptations of consumerism.
- Le avventure di Calandrino e Buffalmacco (Calandrino and Buffalmacco's adventures) – by Carlo Tuzii, with Ninetto Davoli; 6 episodes. Show for children, freely inspired by the Calandrino's stories in Giovanni Boccaccio's Decameron.

==== Scifi and paranormal ====
- L’amaro caso della baronessa di Carini – (The sad story of the baroness of Carini) – by Daniele D’Anza, with Ugo Pagliai, Janet Agren, Adolfo Celi and Paolo Stoppa as the teller; 4 episodes. Inspired by the true story of Laura Lanza, transferred in the 1812 Sicily, the series takes up the topic of the metempsychosis (already treated by the same director in Il segno del comando).
- Ritratto di donna velata (Portrait of painted woman) – by Flavio Bollini, with Nino Castelnuovo and Daria Nicolodi; 5 episodes. Another story of mystery and metempsychosis, this time set in a Tuscany again haunted by the presence of the Etrurians.
- Gamma – by Salvatore Nocita, with Giulio Brogi and Laura Belli; 4 episodes. Sci-fi serial about the brain transplant and its ethical questions.
- La traccia verde (The green track) – by Silvio Mestranzi, with Sergio Fantoni and Paola Pitagora; 3 episodes. Mix of sci-fi and detective story, inspired by the controversial theory of plant perception; a murder is solved thanks to the witness of a house plant, recorded through a polygraph.

=== Serial ===
- Diagnosi – medical drama, directed by Mario Caiano, with Philippe Leroy and Vittorio Mezzogiorno.

=== Variety ===
- Di nuovo tante scuse (Many apologies again) – by Romolo Siena, with Raimondo Vianello and Sandra Mondaini; the show repeats the formula of Tante scuse. It is the most seen show of the year, with 26, 7 million viewers.
- Fatti e fattacci (Deeds and foul deeds) – by Antonello Falqui, with Gigi Proietti and Ornella Vanoni as two wandering actors, playing stories inspired by the Italian folklore and the crime news. Winner of the Rose d’or, it is one of the few RAI variety socially minded.
- Macario uno e due - by Vito Molinari, with Erminio Macario and Gloria Paul.
- Mazzabubù – by Antonello Falqui, with Gabriella Ferri and the Bagaglino troupe. Sequel to Dove sta Zazà, the show recalls nostalgically the Italy of the Fifties.
- Punto e basta – with Gino Bramieri and Sylvie Vartan.
- Spaccaquindici and Un colpo di fortuna (A stroke of luck) – game shows hosted by Pippo Baudo, the former together with Paola Tedesco.
- Più che altro un varetà (Above all a variety) – with Gianfranco Funari (debuting on television), Minnie Minoprio and Quartetto Cetra.

==== Musical shows ====
- Alle nove della sera (At nine in the evening) – hosted by Gianni Morandi and Elisabetta Viviani (introducing in TV).
- La compagnia stabile della canzone con varietà e con comica finale (The permanent song company, variety and slapstick included) – hosted by Christian De Sica, with Mia Martini (who gets a personal success as singer and variety actress), and Renato Rascel .
- Mia, incontro con Mia Martini (Mia, meeting Mia Martini) – by Antonello Falqui.
- Totanbot – musical variety by Romolo Siena, with Iva Zanicchi.

=== News and educational ===
- Come nasce un’opera d’arte (How a work of art is born), care of Franco Simongini, with the presence of the most important Italian artists.
- Dove va l’America (Where America goes) – reportage about United States by Furio Colombo and Alezxander Stille.
- Alcune Afriche (Some Africas) – fifty years later, Alberto Moravia and Andrea Andermann retraces the Andre Gide's Travels in the Congo.
- Una parola, un fatto (A word, a fact) – care of Tullio De Mauro, the program enquiries the ethimology of socially relevant terms, mixing various genres (reportage, interviews and short fiction, directed by Giuliana Berlinguer).

== Ending this year ==
- Canzonissima
- Caravella dei successi
- Dirodorlando
- Senza rete
- Tanto piacere

== Deaths ==
- 2 November - Pier Paolo Pasolini, 53, writer and director. He was one of the severest censors of the Italian television, until requesting its shutdown, but also a constant guest in the RAI cultural programs.
