= 1955 in Italian television =

This is a list of Italian television related events from 1955.

== Events ==
- 27 January. RAI airs on TV, for the first time, the Sanremo Festival, presented by Armando Pizzo. The final evening is broadcast in Eurovision. Claudio Villa wins the contest, with Buongiorno tristezza.
- 8 March. First TV live feed from La Scala. RAI broadcasts an act of La sonnambula, with Maria Callas (conducted by Leonard Bernstein and directed by Luchino Visconti).
- 28–29 April. First TV live feed from the Italian Parliament for the election of the Italian President Giovanni Gronchi;
- 19 November: Debut of Lascia o raddoppia? (see below), the first Italian TV program to meet massive success and become a phenomenon of costume. During Saturday evenings, crowds gather in the public establishments owning a TV set, as private sets are still rare. In an attempt to keep up with television, cinemas project this show before the showing of films. The presenter Mike Bongiorno and the contenders (usually, eccentric province savants) become the first stars of the Italian TV.
- 26 November: for the first time, RAI broadcasts a boxing match, the bout in Milan, between Dulio Loi and Seraphin Ferrer for the European lightweight championship, chronicled by Carlo Bacarelli. The Loi’s victory arouses the enthusiasm of the TV viewiers.
- 17 December. The first Lascia o raddoppia’s champion, music expert Lando Degoli, is eliminated for a wrong answer to an ill-formed question. (“In which opera did Giuseppe Verdi use the contrabassoon?”). In reality, Verdi used the instrument in two operas, Macbeth and Don Carlos. For two weeks, the "contrabasson affair" dominates the press and the public opinion, causing also parliamentary interrogations. Eventually Degoli is readmitted to the contest, but he chooses to quit, serving the 2.560.000 liras gained till then.
- 24 December. The TV service is extended to Naples and Campania.
- 30 December. Eduardo De Filippo debuts on television with Miseria e nobiltà (Poverty and nobility), written by his father Eduardo Scarpetta.
- The RAI general director Filiberto Guala hires several young intellectuals, the so-called “corsairs” (by the formative courses followed). Among them are Umberto Eco, Angelo Guglielmi, Gianni Vattimo and Furio Colombo.
- Debut of Piero Angela and Ruggero Orlando as correspondents, respectively, from Paris and New York. Orlando will serve in this place for seventeen years. Due to his unconventional behavior, he became the most popular Italian TV journalist.

== Debuts ==
- Appuntamento con la novella (Appointment with the novella) – the actor Giorgio Albertazzi reads classic short stories.
- Burattini all’italiana (Puppetry Italian style) – show for children with the Maria Perego's puppets.

=== Magazines ===
- Sguardi sul mondo (Views on the world), later renamed La posta di padre Mariano (Father Mariano’s mail) – religious magazine, hosted by the Capuchin friar Mariano da Torino.
- Buon Natale ovunque tu sia (Merry Christmas, whenever you are) – annual reportage about Christmas, now a precious document about the Italy of the Fifties.
- La TV degli agricoltori (Farmers television) – magazine care of Renato Venturini, hosted by Bianca Maria Piccinino and Emilio Garroni (later, renowned aesthetics scholar); lasted till 1970.
- In libreria (At the bookshop) - book magazine hosted by Riccardo Bacchelli; two seasons.

=== Variety ===
- Lascia o raddoppia? (Quit or double) – quiz, hosted by Mike Bongiorno; 4 seasons; Italian version of the American The $64.000 question and of the French Quitte or double. It’s the most popular Italian TV show of the Fifties (see over).
- Ottovolante (Roller coaster) – game-show hosted by Enrico Luzi, then by Galeazzo Benti, directed by Antonello Falqui; 2 seasons.

== Television shows ==
=== Miniseries ===
- Piccole donne (Little women) – by Anton Giulio Majano, with Lea Padovani, Emma Danieli, Alberto Lupo and Arnoldo Foà; from the Louisa Mary Alcott's novel. Second RAI’s period drama, it repeats the success of Il dottor Antonio, so much that to the previewed four episodes a supplementary one is added.

=== Drama and comedy ===
Vittorio Gassmann debuts in television, playing stage classics as Kean, Oedipus rex (both directed by Franco Enriquez) and Hamlet (directed by Luigi Squarzina, with Memo Benassi and Anna Maria Ferrero).

- No, no Nanette by Otto Harbach and Vincent Youmans, directed by Vito Molinari, with Franca Tamantini, Enrico Viarisio and Alberto Bonucci.
- The merry widow by Franz Lehar, directed by Mario Landi and Bruno Corbucci, with Hilde Gueden and Erminio Macario, orchestra director Bruno Maderna.
- Il terzo marito (The third husband) – by Sabatino Lopez, directed by Silverio Blasi, with Enrica Corti and Alberto Bonucci; a woman at her third marriage is victim of the social prejudices against the widows.
- Ten little indians – by Agatha Christie, directed by Anton Giulio Majano, with Paolo Carlini.

=== Variety ===
- Duecento al secondo (Two hundred by second) – quiz, hosted by Mario Riva, written by Garinei and Giovannini, directed by Romolo Siena, Italian version of Beat the clock. Because the ludicrous and humiliating forfeits endured by the contenders, the show is harshly censured by the press, and deleted by Rai after three months.
- Ti conosco, mascherina (I know you, Masker) – cabaret, directed by Vito Molinari, with Alberto Bonucci, Ferruccio Amendola and an almost debuting Monica Vitti.
- Il telecipede – directed by Daniele D’Anza, with Giustino Durano; first attempt of satirical variety, it’s closed after just two episodes.
- Casa Cugat (Cugat house) – with Xavier Cugat and Abbe Lane; the Lane’s sensual dances are censored and she is forced to wear a big fabric rose on the neckline.
