= Il diavolo sulle colline =

1985 film

- Directed by: Vittorio Cottafavi
- Written by: Elisa Briganti; Manuela Cottafavi; Vittorio Cottafavi
- Starring: Roberto Accornero; Urbano Barberini; Matteo Corvino; Alessandro Fontana
- Cinematography: Tonino Nardi
- Release date: May 1985
- Running time: 105 minutes
- Country: Italy
- Language: Italian

Il diavolo sulle colline is a 1985 Italian drama film directed by Vittorio Cottafavi. It is based on the novel The Devil in the Hills by Cesare Pavese. It was screened in the Un Certain Regard section at the 1985 Cannes Film Festival.

== Cast ==
- Roberto Accornero
- Urbano Barberini
- Matteo Corvino
- Alessandro Fontana
- Daniela Silverio
- Kristina Van Eyck
