= 1951 in Italian television =

This is a list of Italian television related events from 1951.

== Events ==
- September - The first television sets made in Italy are officially presented. The Italian TV is still in an experimental phase and someone also proposes to delay its official starting until the color broadcasting will be available.
- 9 December. The press announces the establishment of a financial company (Gruppo Cisalpino) chaired by Cesare Merzagora and aimed to set up the first Italian private television channel, financed by advertising. The new channel would be based in Milan and start broadcasting in April 1952. The project is stopped by the Minister of Mail and Communications Giuseppe Spataro, but it induces RAI to establish a TV station in Milan, beside the one already existing in Turin.
- The Vatican TV station broadcasts, on an experimental basis, Bicycle Thieves, preceded by an interview by Father Laval with director Vittorio De Sica.

== See also ==
List of Italian films of 1951
