= Ottiero Ottieri =

Italian sociologist and writer

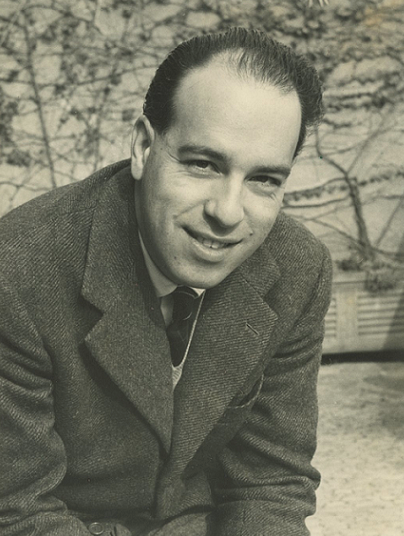

Ottiero Ottieri (1924–2002) was an Italian sociologist and writer.
