= Florence: Days of Destruction =

- Per Firenze
- Directed by: Franco Zeffirelli
- Narrated by: Richard Burton
- Production company: RAI
- Release date: 1966
- Running time: 50 minutes
- Country: Italy
- Languages: English; Italian

Florence: Days of Destruction (Italian: Per Firenze) is a 1966 documentary about the 1966 Flood of the Arno River and its catastrophic effect on the city of Florence. Directed by Franco Zeffirelli, it is Zeffirelli's only documentary, and features the only known film footage of the flood. The film is 50 minutes long, and was produced by RAI. Released less than a month after the disaster, the film reputedly raised more than $20 million for the reconstruction efforts.

The film was narrated in English and Italian by actor Richard Burton, who had been making The Taming of the Shrew with Zeffirelli at the time.

Variety described the film as a "magnificent, frightening document".

== See also ==
- 1966 Flood of the Arno River
