= 1960 in Italian television =

This is a list of Italian television related events of 1960.

== Events ==
- 6 January: Joe Sentieri wins Canzonissima with Piove (Ciao, ciao bambina).
- 10 January: for the first time, RAI broadcasts a Serie A match (Bologna-Napoli, commentator Piero Pasini), also if delayed and limitedly to the second half. The “synthesis of the match”, aired in the late Sunday afternoon, becomes a ritual for the Italian football fans for almost forty years, until the advent of pay-tv.
- 30 January: the duo Renato Rascel and Tony Dallara wins the Sanremo Music Festival with Romantica. The show, presented by Paolo Ferrari and Enza Sampò, is seen in Eurovision by 30 million viewers.
- 13 July: the Constitutional Court of Italy, rejecting an appeal by the Roman editor Renato Angiolillo, establishes the lawfulness of the RAI monopoly of TV broadcasting and forbids the creation of private channels. However, the sentence obliges also RAI to grant the objectivity of the information and the access to the television of all the political forces.
- 21 August: at the Verona Arena, the presenter Mario Riva, who is going to lead the final evening of the Festival del Musichiere, falls in a not signaled trap door and is gravely injured. RAI does not give notice of the accident and the show goes regularly on air; the singer Miranda Martino is chosen at the last minute to replace the host. Riva, by then the most popular figure of the Italian television, dies ten days later at the Verona hospital; 250,000 persons follow his burial, the first of a TV star in Italy.
- 25 August -11 September: 1960 Summer Olympics, celebrated in Rome. For the first time in history, the Olympic Games are broadcast live. RAI shows itself equal to the occasion, employing an hundred workstations, 450 technicians and 17 commentators and producing 106 hours of airing in Mondovision.
- 1 September: at the San Siro stadium in Milan, in front of 53,000 spectators, Duilio Loi beats Carlos Ortiz and wins the light welterweight world title. The match is broadcast on television.
- October 11: for the 1960 Italian local elections, the first airing of the Electoral tribune, hosted by Gianni Granzotto. Exponents of every party answer to the journalists' questions; for the first time, the left and right opposition factions had access to the Italian television. The program is inaugurated by the Minister of Interior Mario Scelba who, despite his reputation as a reactionary, appears on video humorous and relaxed. The following day it is the turn of the DC secretary Aldo Moro. Moro appears rather uneasy with the new medium.
- November 15: first airing of Non è mai troppo tardi, tutorial program aimed to the illiterates, care of the Ministry of Public Education and hosted by Alberto Manzi. Thanks to the “schoolmaster Manzi”s lessons, 35,000 adults get the Primary school diploma.

== Debuts ==
=== Serials ===
- United States - I love Lucy

=== Variety ===
- Controcanale – hosted by Corrado Mantoni; with Abbe Lane; 2 seasons. A joke pronounced by the host (“Italy is a republic based on the promissory notes”, parody of the Italian constitution’s first article) causes political controversies and the temporary suspension of the show.

=== News and educational ===
- Non è mai troppo tardi (It’s never too late”), with Alberto Manzi (see over); 8 seasons.
- Tribuna elettorale (Electoral tribune) – see over.

== Television shows ==
=== Drama and comedy ===
- Tartarino di Tarascona (Tartarin of Tarascon) – from the Alphonse Daudet’s novel, by Vittorio Brignole, with Michele Malaspina; for children.
- Il novelliere – by Daniele D’Anza; cycle of tv plays with musical interludes from the tales by five great writers (Salvatore Di Giacomo, Luigi Pirandello, O. Henry, Anton Cekhov, Oscar Wilde). It includes Il salotto di Oscar Wilde (Oscar Wilde’s parlor), from The picture of Dorian Gray and Lord Arthur Saville’s crime, with Galuco Mauri as Oscar Wilde, Mario Girotti (Terence Hill) as Dorian Gray and Franco Volpi as Lord Arthur Saville.
- Teatro in dialetto (Vernacular theatre) – anthology of plays in Regional Italian, from Veneto to Sicily, care of Eugenio Palmieri and Federico Zardi.
- The White Horse Inn, operetta by Ralph Benatzky and Robert Stolz, directed by Vito Molinari, with Nino Besozzi, Elena Sedlak and Paolo Poli.

==== Light theatre ====
- Caviale e lenticchie (Cavair and lentils) by Renzo Tarabusi and Giulio Scarnicci, with Nino Taranto and Gildo Paragallo ingegnere by Emerico Valentinetti, with Gilberto Govi; both the plays have a pleasant trickster as protagonist.
- M. T. milizia territoriale by Aldo De Benedetti, directed by Claudio Fino with Umberto Melnati; an ordinary man, oppressed in the family and at work, has a momentary redemption when he is called up for military service.

==== Classic theatre ====
- Andromaque by Jean Racine, directed by Giacomo Vaccari, with Elena Zareschi and Tino Carraro.
- The troyan women by Euripides, directed by Claudio Fino, with Sarah Ferrati and Anna Miserocchi.
- Macbeth by William Shakespeare, directed by Alessandro Brissoni, with Enrico Maria Salerno and Elena Zareschi.
- King Lear by William Shakespeare, directed by Sandro Bolchi, with Salvo Randone, Fosco Giachetti and Nando Gazzolo.
- The imaginary invalid by Moliere, directed by Alessandro Brissoni, with Sergio Tofano and Marisa Merlini
- The mistress of the inn, directed by Claudio Fino, with Marina Dolfin, Tino Carraro and Mario Scaccia, and The coffee shop, directed by Guglielmo Morandi, with Salvo Randone, Giancarlo Sbragia and Ennio Balbo.both by Carlo Goldoni.

=== Miniseries ===
- Ragazza mia (My girl) – from William Saroyan’s Mama, I love you, by Mario Landi, with Lea Padovani, Ivo Garrani and the baby star Maria Letizia Gazzoni; 4 episodes. The little daughter of an actress saves the marriage and the career of the mother.
- Tutto da rifare pover’uomo (Lilltle man, it’s all gone) – from Hans Fallada’s Little man, what now?, by Eros Macchi, with Ferruccio De Ceresa and Carla Del Poggio; 5 episodes.

==== Period dramas ====
- Il piccolo Lord (Little lord Fauntleroy) – from the Frances Hodgson Burnett’s novel, by Vittorio Brignole, with the child actor Vittorio Pistolini; 4 episodes.
- La Pisana – from Ippolito Nievo’s Confessions of an Italian, by Giacomo Vaccari, with Lydia Alfonsi, Giulio Bosetti and Gian Maria Volontè; 6 episodes. Realized as an homage to Nievo in the centenary of his death, the serials tells the tormented love story between a young patriot and his cousin, an unprejudiced noblewoman, with the Napoleonic wars in the background.
- Tom Jones – from the Henry Fielding’s novel, by Eros Macchi, with Pino Colizzi; 6 episodes.
- Vita col padre e con la madre – from Life with Father and Life with Mother, by Howard Lindsay and Russel Crouse, by Daniele D’Anza, with Paolo Stoppa and Rina Morelli.

=== Variety ===
- Canzonissima 1960 – hosted by Alberto Lionello (who becomes very popular for his imitation of Maurice Chevalier), Lauretta Masiero and Aroldo Tieri; won by Tony Dallara with Romantica.
- Primo piano (Close-up) – Pippo Baudo debuts as variety presenter.
- Sentimentale – hosted by Lelio Luttazzi, with Mina as constant guest.
- La tintarella (The tan) – summer variety, with Gino Bramieri.

=== News and documentaries ===
- La Sicilia del gattopardo (The Sicily of The leopard) – documentary by Ugo Gregoretti about Giuseppe Tomasi di Lampedusa and his world.
- L’Italia non è un paese povero (Italy is not a poor country) – documentary by Joris Ivens, commissioned by Enrico Mattei to celebrate the ten years of ENI, text by Alberto Moravia read by Enrico Maria Salerno; 3 episodes. Before broadcasting, RAI submitted the film to censorship, eliminating or replacing the sequences showing the misery of Southern Italy.
- Chi legge? Viaggio lungo il Tirreno (Who reads? Travelling along the Tyrrhenian Sea) – reportage in 8 episodes by Mario Soldati (in collaboration with Cesare Zavattini); after a century, the writer retraces backward the itinerary of the Expedition of the thousands, from Marsala to Quarto, enquiring about the readings of the Italians.
- Donne in cammino (Walking women) – documentary about history of feminism, by Ugo Gregoretti and Luciana Giambuzzi.
- L'agricoltura in Italia (Agriculture in Italy) - care of professor Giuseppe Dondi.
- La nostra terra è l'acqua (Our land is water) - by Giorgio Moser, reportage about Indonesia.
- Gli Italiani al Polo Nord (The Italians at the North Pole): enquiry in three episodes by Gianni Bisiach about the two Umberto Nobile’s polar expeditions.

== Ending this year ==
- Il Musichiere

== Deaths ==
- 1 september: Mario Riva, 47, presenter (see over).
