= 1952 in Italian television =

This is a list of Italian television related events from 1952.

== Events ==
- January 26: by a decree of the President of the Republic, the 1927 agreement between the Italian State and RAI is renewed. RAI obtains for twenty years the monopoly of radio and television broadcasting. The majority of the company's shares are owned by IRI; the board of directors is elected partly by IRI and partly by the government and elects President and General Manager, with the approval of the Prime Minister. Regular television broadcasts in Milan, Turin and Rome are expected to begin within 18 months.
- February 7: in Turin, experiments of live television coverage are effectuated outside the Ice Palace.
- March 24: always in Turin, RAI broadcasts live Anton Chekhov’s play The Bear, directed by Mario Landi; despite the several technical issues, the experiment is welcomed by the press.
- April 12: for the trade fair, first experimental TV broadcastings in Milan, from an aerial in the Parco Sempione Tower; among the novelties, a news program with the daily events from the world and from Lombardy. The Prime Minister Alcide De Gasperi is the first Italian politician to appear in video, while he inaugurates the fair. He declares: “I see in television a new instrument confirming and hastening unity, concord and fraternity in the nation among the social classes, the regions, the North and the South.”
- September: In Turin, the regular TV broadcastings begin, for 4 hours by day (from 5 to 7 PM and from 9 to 11 PM); in November, they begin in Milan. For the end of the year, 7,000 families in Turin follow the RAI programs.
- September 10: first official edition of Telegiornale (TV news program), after the experiment for the Milan trade fair. It is aired three times in a week; its director is Vittorio Veltroni, its first speaker is Furio Caccia. The news of the first issue are:
  - an historical Regatta in Venice;
  - Carlo Sforza’s burial;
  - a bullfighting in Portugal;
  - curiosities about the United States presidential elections;
  - Alberto Ascari wins the Formula One Italian Grand Prix.
- October 9: inauguration of the RAI television production center in Milan.

== Television shows ==
- Dopo Cena, from Alwyne Whatsley and Lewis Stringer’s After dinner; directed by Mario Landi, with Ubaldo Lay and Marisa Mantovani; first Italian TV play.
