= Il triangolo rosso =

- Country of origin: Italy

Il triangolo rosso is an Italian television series broadcast by RAI in 1967 and 1969.

It was directed by Mario Maffei, Piero Nelli and Ruggero Deodato, the main performers were Jacques Sernas, Riccardo Garrone, and Elio Pandolfi.

The main characters in the stories were a Polizia Stradale lieutenant and two brigadiers, who investigate to uncover the dynamics of serious accidents. The events are inspired by actual events.

The first series, consisting of six episodes, was broadcast on Fridays on the second channel. The second series, of seven episodes, aired two years later on Thursday night on the national program.

The opening credits theme song, Guarda dove vai, by Franco Califano and Totò Savio, was performed by Marie Laforêt.

The end theme song, Era uno come noi, by Francesco Specchia and Claudio Cavallaro, was played by I Profeti.

== Episodes ==
=== First series ===
- The Unknown, directed by Piero Nelli, broadcast July 21, 1967
- Un paio di occhiali, directed by Mario Maffei, broadcast July 28, 1967
- Court of Assizes, directed by Mario Maffei, broadcast on August 4, 1967
- The Two Truths, directed by Mario Maffei, broadcast August 11, 1967
- The black hat, directed by Piero Nelli, broadcast August 18, 1967
- The night watchman, directed by Piero Nelli, broadcast August 25, 1967

=== Second series ===
- Il segreto del lago, directed by Ruggero Deodato, broadcast August 14, 1969
- La fuga, directed by Mario Maffei, broadcast on August 21, 1969
- Gli amici, directed by Ruggero Deodato, broadcast on August 28, 1969
- La chiave, directed by Mario Maffei, broadcast September 4, 1969
- La luce bianca, directed by Mario Maffei, broadcast September 11, 1969
- The Golden Trumpet, directed by Mario Maffei, broadcast September 18, 1969
- The clock has stopped, directed by Mario Maffei, broadcast September 25, 1969

== See also ==
- List of Italian television series
