= Luigi Lunari =

Italian playwright (1934–2019)

Luigi Lunari (January 3, 1934 – August 15, 2019) was an Italian playwright, translator, essayist and screenwriter.

== Biography ==
In 1939, in order to avoid the indoctrination of the fascist school, he was enrolled by his father in the Deutsche Schule in Milan, managed by the "Congregation of the Sisters of Our Lady", far from any Nazi ideology. From 1942 to 1946 he lived the period of displacement in his father's birthplace (Arzignano, Vicenza). In 1946, he returned to Milan to attend middle school and gymnasium at the Gonzaga dei Salesiani Institute, and classical high school at the Carducci high school, where he had as a classmate Bettino Craxi. Enrolled in the Faculty of Law of the University of Milan, he graduated in 1956. He also attended the Arrigo Boito Conservatory of Parma.
