= Vittorio Cottafavi =

Italian film director (1914–1998)

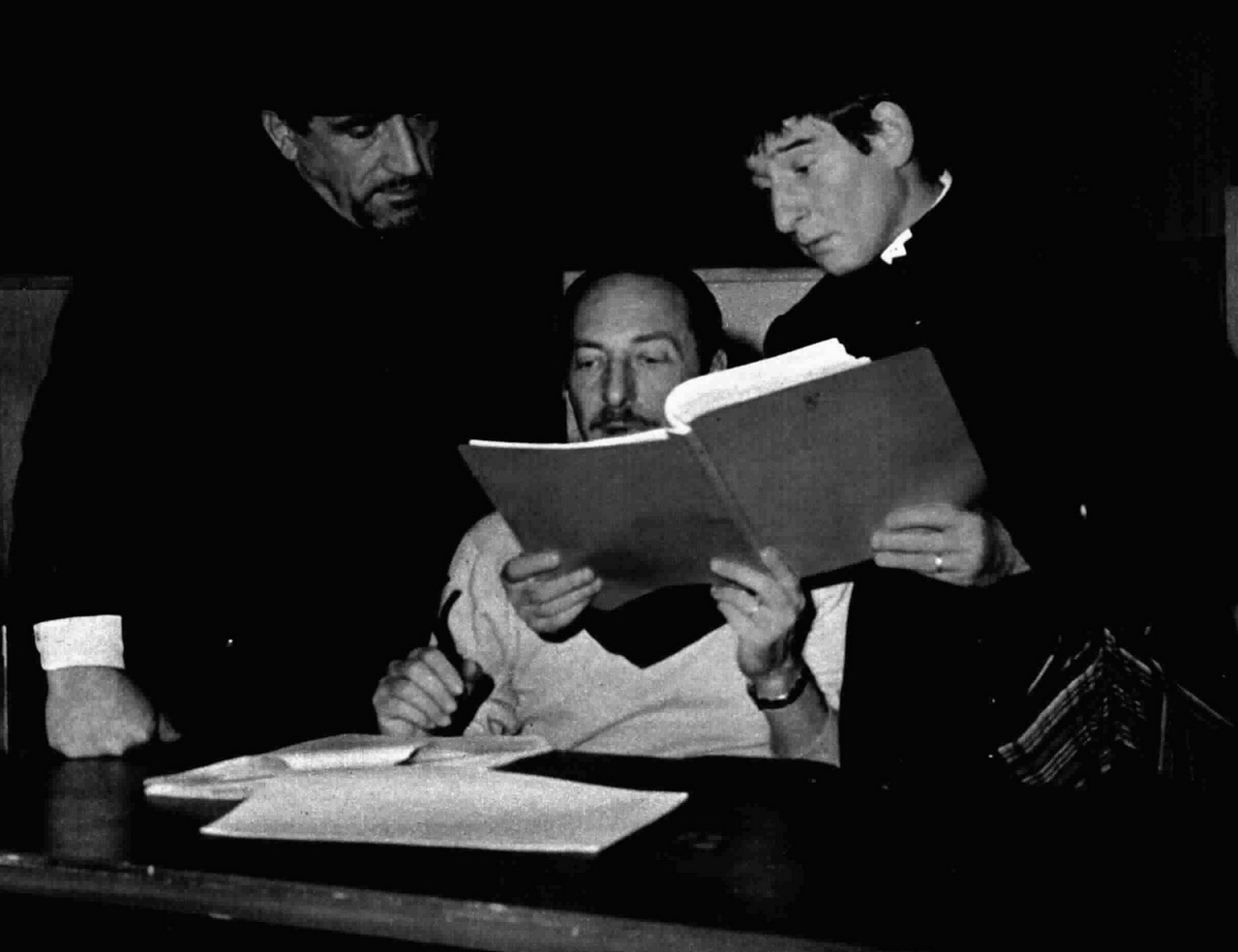
- Cottafavi between actors Arnoldo Foà and Renato Rascel (1970)
- Born: 30 January 1914; Modena, Italy
- Died: 14 December 1998 (aged 84); Anzio, Italy
- Occupations: Film director, screenwriter
- Years active: 1943-1985

Vittorio Cottafavi (30 January 1914 – 14 December 1998) was an Italian film director and screenwriter. He directed 70 films between 1943 and 1985. His film Il diavolo sulle colline was screened in the Un Certain Regard section at the 1985 Cannes Film Festival.

== Selected filmography ==
- I nostri sogni (1943)
- The Gates of Heaven (1945) (actor)
- The Sun Still Rises (1946)
- The Unknown Man of San Marino (1946)
- Fire Over the Sea (1947)
- La grande strada (1948)
- The Flame That Will Not Die (1949)
- A Woman Has Killed (1952)
- Milady and the Musketeers (1952)
- Traviata '53 (1953)
- A Free Woman (1954)
- It Takes Two to Sin in Love (1954)
- Le legioni di Cleopatra (1959)
- Messalina (1960)
- Hercules and the Conquest of Atlantis (1961)
- 100 Horsemen (1964)
- Il diavolo sulle colline (1985)
