= Anton Giulio Majano =

Italian screenwriter

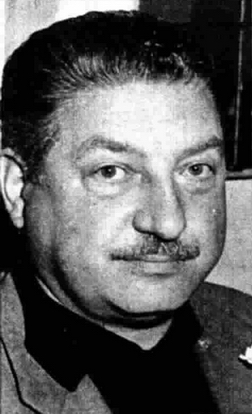
- Born: 5 July 1909; Chieti, Kingdom of Italy
- Died: 12 August 1994 (aged 85)
- Occupations: Screenwriter; Film director
- Years active: 1937–1986

Anton Giulio Majano (5 July 1909 – 12 August 1994) was an Italian screenwriter and film director. His career spanned from 1937 to 1986.

== Selected filmography ==
=== Director and screenwriter ===
- The Eternal Chain (1952)
- Good Folk's Sunday (1953)
- The Rival (1956)
- Il padrone delle ferriere (1959)
- Atom Age Vampire (1960)
- The Corsican Brothers (1961)
- La Cittadella (TV, 1964)
- David Copperfield (TV, 1965)
- E le stelle stanno a guardare (TV, 1971)
- Marco Visconti (1975, TV series)

=== Screenwriter ===
- Hurricane in the Tropics (1939)
- Un giorno nella vita (1946)
- Biraghin (1946)
- The White Primrose (1947)
- The Other (1947)
- Un giorno nella vita (1948)
- City of Pain (1948)
- Flying Squadron (1949)
- The Beggar's Daughter (1950)
- Cavalcade of Heroes (1950)
- Strano appuntamento (1950)
- A Mother Returns (1952)
- For You I Have Sinned (1953)
