= 1979 in Italian television =

This is a list of Italian television related events from 1979.

== Events ==
=== RAI ===
- January 13: Mino Vergnaghi, with Amare, wins the Sanremo music festival, hosted by Mike Bongiorno and Anna Maria Rizzoli. Rai broadcasts integrally only the finally evening, that gets a rating of 22.3 million viewers.
- 22 February. Announcement of the sentence in the Catanzaro trial, for the Piazza Fontana bombing. The hearings have been, for the first time, integrally shoot by the RAI cameras. From 25 September, a selection in five episodes of the proceedings is aired, showing to the public the embarrassed and reticent depositions of politicians, such as Giulio Andreotti and Mariano Rumor.
- 26 April. The documentary Trial for rape, realized by a feminist collective, shocks public opinion, showing the victim of a ravishment humiliated and criminalized by the defense attorneys.
- 15 December. The adolescent actress Fabiana Udenio announces the beginning of RETE 3 broadcasting. This is the schedule of the first day.

18:30	Il pollice (anticipations)
19:00	TG3 and TGR
19:30	Tutti in scena (entertainment magazine)
20:00	Teatrino (puppetry show)
20:05	The taking of power by Louis XIV
21:35	TG3
22:05	Teatrino

Rete 3 is, in the intents, focused on the local realities, with programs and news realized by the RAI regional offices; however, for years it will be a “ghost channel”, lacking of means and ignored by the public.

- The most watched show of the year is Portobello, with an average rate of 25.1 million viewers.

=== Private channels ===
In 1979, Italian private television stations have a breakthrough: the most active massively buy films and American telefilms, hire RAI stars such as Mike Bongiorno and Pippo Baudo and begin to broadcast nationally (the rule forcing them to operate only locally is bypassed, airing on several local stations the same show, prerecorded on videotape). Particularly dynamic is Silvio Berlusconi’s Telemilano 58.

==== New television stations (with the date of the first airing) ====
- January: Elefante TV, syndacation managed by the Marcucci brothers, focused on sport and information:
- 4 March: TV Port, syndication of 90 local channels, specialized in American film and telefilm.
- 19 June: Antenna Sicilia, owned by the newspaper editor Mario Cancio Sanfilippo, art director Pippo Baudo
- July: Rete televisiva Italiana, owned by Il Messaggero's editor Carlo Perrone.
- 2 July : Compagnia televisioni Associate; syndication of 20 local channels.
- Autunni : TV Parma
- 8 September. GPE-Telemond, by Arnoldo Mondadori editore, later fused with Rete televisiva Italiana in Rete 4.

==== Berlusconi's ascent ====
- 30 January: Silvio Berlusconi founds Rete Italia, society for the marketing of TV shows. The newborn society gets right away a big deal, buoying 325 movies from Titanus for 2 billion lira.
- 13 September : Birth of Publitalia, Berlusconi's advertising media agency.
- December. Telemilano 58, until then visible only in Milan, extends its signal to the whole Lombardy.
- 5 December. Mike Bongiorno debuts on Silvio Berlusconi's Telemilano 58 with the game show The dreams in the weaver; he's the first TV star who leaves RAI to work full-time for a private network. The collaboration between Bongiorno and the public company, lasted 27 years, has got into crisis few months before with an unsuccessful remake of Lascia o raddoppia?

== Debuts ==
=== RAI ===
- 3,2,1... contatto – show for children, inspired by the homonymous PBS program; 2 season. It sees the debut of Paolo Bonolis.
- Fantastico (Fantastic) – show of the Saturday evening, aired in autumn and bound to the Lotteria Italia. In the 1980s, as Canzonissima in the Sixties, it is the most viewed RAI show and causes also political controversies. The first edition, directed by Enzo Trapani and hosted by Beppe Grillo, Loretta Goggi and Heather Parisi, gets an audience of 23.6 million viewers.
- Storia di un italiano (History of an Italian) – history of the modern Italy through an anthology of the Alberto Sordi’s movies – 4 seasons.
- TG3 settimanale (Weekly TG3) - magazine

=== Private channels ===
- Ciao ciao (Hello hello) – cartoon show; started on the Mondadori's Telenord, it later becomes one of the most popular shows for children on the Fininvest network - 32 seasons.
- I sogni nel cassetto (Dreams in the drawer) – game show, hosted by Mike Bongiorno (Telemilano 58) – 2 seasons.
- TG Telenuovo (Telenuovo Verona, 1979) by Germano Mosconi.
- Telemattina (TV morning) – with Ettore Andenna, first European show aired in the morning (Antenna 3) – 2 seasons.
- Telemenù – cooking show, with Wilma De Angelis (Telemontecarlo) – 18 seasons.
- The Buggzum (TMC) - game show hosted by Franchy TV and is about deciding the words.
- VG21 news (Canale 21)

=== International ===
- (United States) M*A*S*H (RAI 1)
- (Germany) Derrick (Rai 2)
- (United States) Columbo (Rai 2)
- (United States) Starsky and Hutch (Rai 2)
- (United Kingdom) George & Mildred (Rai 2)
- (United States) How the West Was Won (Rai 2)
- (United States) Charlie's Angels (GPE-Telemond)
- (United States) General Hospital (local networks)

== Television shows ==
=== Drama ===
- La torre (The tower) – by Hugo von Hofmannsthal, remake of Pedro Calderon de la Barca’s Life is dream, directed by Luca Ronconi (stage) and Miklos Jancso (television), with Franco Branciaroli.
- La promessa (The promise) – by Alberto Negrin, with Rossano Brazzi; from Friedrich Durrenmatt’s The pledge.
- Rocco Scotellaro – by Maurizio Scaparro, with Bruno Cirino; the true story of Rocco Scotellaro, poet, socialist militant and major of his village.
- L’altro Simenon - cycle of four TV movies, by various directors, from the George Simenon’s novels without the Inspector Maigret.
- The tree of Wooden Clogs by Ermanno Olmi and Orchestra rehearsal by Federico Fellini (both previously distributed in the cinemas).

=== Musical comedy ===
- Anche i bancari hanno un’anima (The bank clerk too have a soul) by Terzoli and Vaime, directed by Gino Landi, with Gino Bramieri and Valeria Valeri; a bank clerk, on the eve of retirement, has a gallant adventure (actually organized by his colleagues).
- Profumo di classe (Classy perfume) - by Giorgio Capitani, with Ombretta Colli and Aldo Maccione; inspired by Pygmalion, but with inverted gender roles (here, it's a female teacher to educate a tramp).
- Addavenì quel giorno e quella sera (That day and that evening have to come) – by Giorgio Ferrara, with Ninetto Davoli and Adriana Asti, music by Antonello Venditti; controversial attempt to adapt the themes of Pasolini's fiction in form of musical comedy.

=== Miniseries ===
- Cinema! – by Pupi Avati, with Lino Capolicchio, in 5 episodes; follow-up of Jazz Band, it fictionalizes the adventurous Avati's debut as movie director.
- Ma che cos’è questo amore? (This love, what is it?) – by Ugo Gregoretti, in 2 episodes, with Stefano Satta Flores and Roberto Benigni, from the Achille Campanile’s humoristic novel; the slap of a woman to an intrusive suitor has the most unpredictable and absurd consequences.
- (United States) Holocaust; the hit of the year among the minsieries, with 20.2 million viewiers.

==== Period dramas ====
- Accadde ad Ankara (It happened in Ankara) – by Mario Landi, in 3 episodes; reconstruction of the “Cicero affair” with Stefano Satta Flores as Elyesa Bazna.
- L’affare Stavisky by Luigi Perelli, with Pietro Biondi in the title role and Ivana Monti.
- Le affinità elettive (Elective affinities) – by Gianni Amico, from the Johan Wolfgang Goethe’s novel, with Franco Graziosi, Nino Castelnuovo and the future director Francesca Archibugi; 3 episodes.
- Bel Ami – by Sandro Bolchi, with Corrado Pani, in 4 episodes; from the Guy de Maupassant’s novel.
- Che fare? (What is to be done?) – by Gianni Serra, with Elisabetta Pozzi and Remo Girone, in 5 episodes; from the Nikolaj Gavrilovič Černyševskij’s novel.
- Il delitto Notarbatolo (The Notarbartolo affair) – by Alberto Negrin, in 3 episodes, with Ivo Garrani; reconstruction of the first clamorous Mafia crime, happened 1n 1893.
- La commediante veneziana (The venetian actress) – by Savatore Nocita, in 5 episodes, from the Raffaello Calzini's novel; the life of the actress Teodora Ricci, lover of Carlo Gozzi.
- I vecchi e I giovani (The old and the young ones) – by Marco Leto, with Gabriele Ferzetti and Alain Cuny, in 5 episodes; from the Luigi Pirandello’s novel. In the Sicilia of the late Nineteenth century, the “old generation” (the Risorgimento men, by now corrupted or disillusioned) face the “young people” (the socialists of the Fasci Siciliani).
- Martin Eden – by Giacomo Battiato, with Christopher Connelly, in 5 episodes, from the Jack London’s novel.

==== Mystery ====
- Così per gioco (Just a game) – by Leonardo Cortese, in 5 episodes, with Mariano Rigillo; mystery set in the world of the gamble.
- La mano sugli occhi (The hand on the eyes) – by Pino Passalacqua, written by Andrea Camilleri, with Leopoldo Trieste, in 3 episodes; a quiet chicken farmer is inexplicably involved in a mafia plot.
- Astuzia per astuzia (Cunning for cunning) by Mario Caiano, with Mario Carotenuto and Elsa Martinelli; a former lawyer enquires about the murder of a model.
- La dama dei veleni (The dame of the poisons) – by Silverio Blasi, from John Dickson Carr’s The burning court, with Ugo Pagliai and Susanna Martinkova. and Morte a passo di valzer (Death at a waltz pace) by Giovanni Fago, from same author's Fire, burn !, with Gianni Garko and Macha Meril
- Luigi Ganna detective – by Maurizio Ponzi, in 4 episodes, with Luigi Pistilli; the adventures of a Milan private eye.
- La vedova e il piedipiatti (The widow and the cop) – comic-mystery serial, by Mario Landi, in 6 episodes; with Ave Ninchi and Veronica Lario.
- Il giorno dei cristalli (Crystals day) political thriller by Giacomo Battiato, with Francisco Rabal and Saverio Marconi; a neo-fascist organization plans an attack to sabotage a peace conference.

==== Fantastic ====
- Racconti di fantascienza (SF tales) – by Alessandro Blasetti (in the last direction of a fifty years career), in 3 episodes, with Arnoldo Foà as the teller.
- I racconti fantastici di Edgar Allan Poe (Edgar Allan Poe’s fantastic tales) – by Daniele D’Anza, in 4 episodes, with Philippe Leroy as Roderick Usher. The classical horror stories of the American writer are transferred in the USA of the Twentieth Century.
- Il filo e il labirinto (The thread and the labyrinth) – by various directors, written by Biagio Proietti; cycle of four stories with paranormal implications.
- Paura sul mondo (Fear on the world) by Domenico Campana, from Corrado Alvaro’s dystopian novel The man is strong, with Ugo Pagliai, Laura Belli and Raoul Grassilli.

=== News and educational ===
- Made in England - reportage about England, by Enzo Biagi, in 12 episodes.
- Il cuore della Jugoslavia è fatto di mulini (Yugoslavia's heart is made by mills) - reportage by Tonino Guerra, in 3 episodes.
- Sono arrivati quattro fratelli (Four brothers are arrived) – documentary by Maricla Boggio about the child-adoption.
- Un autore una città (An author a city) – six great Italian writers speak about their link with the home town.
- Quando è arrivata la televisione (When television arrived) – documentary by Ermanno Olmi, celebrating the 25th anniversary of Italian television
- Il lavoro contro la vita (Labour versus life) - by Anna Lajolo, Guido Lombardi and Alfredo Leonardi; documentary on the Porto Marghera chemical industry and its negative effects on the health of workers and the environment.

=== Variety ===
- C’era una volta Roma (Once upon a time in Rome) – with the Bagaglino troupe; parodic history of the Italian capital.
- Carissimi, la nebbia agli irti colli (Dearest, the fog at the steep hills) – first variety aired on Rai 3.
- Due come noi (Two people like us) – by Antonello Falqui, with Pino Caruso and Ornella Vanoni.
- Grand’Italia– talk show, hosted by Maurizio Costanzo.
- Sotto il divano (Under the sofa) – talk-show hosted by Adriana Asti.
- Luna park – hosted by Pippo Baudo, with Tina Turner as constant guest; debut of Heather Parisi.
- Tilt – with Stefania Rotolo.
- Una valigia tutta blu (A fully blue bag) – musical show, hosted by Walter Chiari.

==== Private channels ====
- Il Napoleone – game show, with Ettore Andenna, directed by Cino Tortorella (Antenna 3 Lombardia)
- Ottava nota – music show, with Richard Benson (TVA 40).

== Ending this year ==
- L’altra domenica
- Gioco città.
- Montecarlo sera
- Non Stop
- La sberla.

== Networks and services ==
=== Launches ===
Network	Type	Launch date	Notes	Source
Antenna Sicilia	Cable and satellite	Unknown		
Tele Arena	Cable and satellite	Unknown		
Televisione Cristiana in Italia	Cable and satellite	Unknown		
Telepace	Cable and satellite	Unknown		
Telenuovo	Cable and satellite	12 November		

=== Conversions and rebrandings ===
Old network name	New network name	Type	Conversion Date	Notes	Source

=== Closures ===
Network	Type	Closure date	Notes	Source

== Births ==
- 3 January: Francesco Bellissimo, celebrity chef

== Deaths ==
- 3 November: Paolo Carlini, 57, actor, star of the early Italian television.
- 5 November: Amedeo Nazzari, 72, actor, star of the black-and white Italian cinema, in the Sixties active in television as player in fiction and TV-dramas.
- 3 December: Alighiero Noschese, 47, impersonator, who shots himself in the chapel of the Roman clinic where he was hospitalized; he suffered for years from depression, because the divorce and some professional fails.
