= Topo Gigio (disambiguation) =

Topo Gigio is a fictional anthropomorphic mouse, originally the lead character of a children's puppet show on Italian television in the early 1960s.

Topo Gigio may also refer to:

- Topo Gigio (1988 TV series)
- Topo Gigio (2020 TV series)
