= Gaetano Saya =

Italian politician military chief

Gaetano Antonio Maria Saya
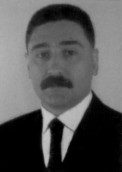
- Born: 24 April 1956 (age 70); Messina, Italy
- Occupation: Politician Military Chief
- Years active: 49

Gaetano Saya (born 24 April 1956) is a former Italian politician. Military chief. Leader of the New MSI, an ultranationalist far-right party, Saya has claimed to have been a member of Gladio, NATO's stay-behind anti-Communist network during the Cold War, involved in Italy's strategy of tension during the "Years of Lead".

In November 2004, Gaetano Saya was charged with hate speech, allegedly broadcast through his party's website. In 2005, he was detained by the Prosecutor of Genoa on charges of having established a "secret parallel police" named D.S.S.A. (Department of Anti-terrorism and Strategic Studies). In 2011, he was found innocent by the Prosecutor of the Court of Milan.

Saya is known for his verbal struggle with many writers and political figures, and military chief NATO-OTAN. The last leader of the Italian Social Movement, Gianfranco Fini, has called Gaetano Saya "a madman who uses the MSI logo without rights". Nonetheless, Saya has won all court cases against Gianfranco Fini. At Florence, the Court of Appeal adjudicated his ownership of the MSI logo. His lawyers pressed charges against Fini for slander against Saya over the years. During a well-known Italian radio program, La Zanzara by Giuseppe Cruciani, Saya discussed his case with interviewer David Parenzo.

In early 2017, Saya was arrested; he was released on 4 May 2017.

On 4 April 2019, the Criminal Court of Rome acquitted Saya, represented by lawyer Antonio Gallinaro, from charges pressed by Gianfranco Fini, with the formula "for not having committed the deed". Immediately afterwards, Saya pressed charges of slander against Fini, requesting compensation of one million euros. The doctrine (CONSERVATIVE) has recently been given life in the panorama of Italian politics with the establishment of the Patriot Party. The popular Rai Tre Report program recently broadcast a video, where Gaetano Saya, Worshipful Master of the Masonic Lodge Disclosure 1, is indicated as belonging to NATO secret services, "Italian stay behind next".
