= The Magic World of Topo Gigio =

- English-language poster
- Directed by: Federico Caldura; Luca De Rico
- Written by: Federico Caldura; Mario Faustinelli; Guido Stagnaro
- Distributed by: Columbia Pictures (United States)
- Release dates: 1961 (Italy); 26 November 1965 (U.S.)
- Running time: 75 minutes
- Country: Italy
- Language: Italian

The Magic World of Topo Gigio (Italian: Le avventure di topo Gigio) is a 1961 Italian family puppets film directed by Federico Caldura. It is also known as The Italian Mouse and The World of Topo Gigio. It was the first full-length feature film of the Topo Gigio Italian children's television series.

== Cast ==
- Peppino Mazzullo as Topo Gigio
- Armando Benetti
- Ignazio Colnaghi
- Carlo Delfini
- Ignazio Dolce
- Federica Milani
- Ermanno Roveri
- Milena Zini
