= Sabrina Simoni =

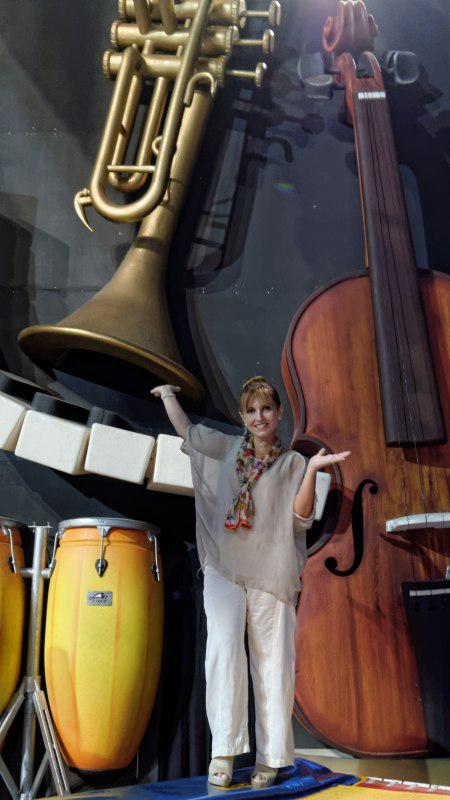
- Sabrina Simoni
- Born: 16 October 1969 (age 55); Bologna, Italy
- Occupation: musician
- Years active: 1995–2025

Sabrina Simoni (born 16 October 1969) has been interested in classical music since her childhood.

== Biography ==
She graduated from Music Conservatory in Ferrara. She joined the Institute of Antoniano di Bologna around 1991.

At first she was working with the teenager/studentchoir Le Verdi Note. When Mariele Ventre, the conductor of the better known Antoniano children's choir Piccolo Coro dell'Antoniano had to have an urgent operation exactly during the preparations of the 1992 children's songfestival Zecchino d'Oro, she asked Sabrina Simoni and her friend Antonella Tosti (ex-Piccolo Coro singer) to take charge of the children's choir and the preparations for the festival.

Afterwards, Mariele Ventre has been teaching and preparing Sabrina Simoni to one day take over the direction of the Piccolo Coro. After Mariele Ventre's death in 1995, Sabrina became the new conductor of the Piccolo Coro dell'Antoniano.

Her job as conductor and music teacher to very young children has led Sabrina Simoni to publish two children's books: Favole in Canto (2003) and La tastiera incantata (2003). Both books have the goal of developing a young child's musical ear in a playful manner.

== Gallery ==
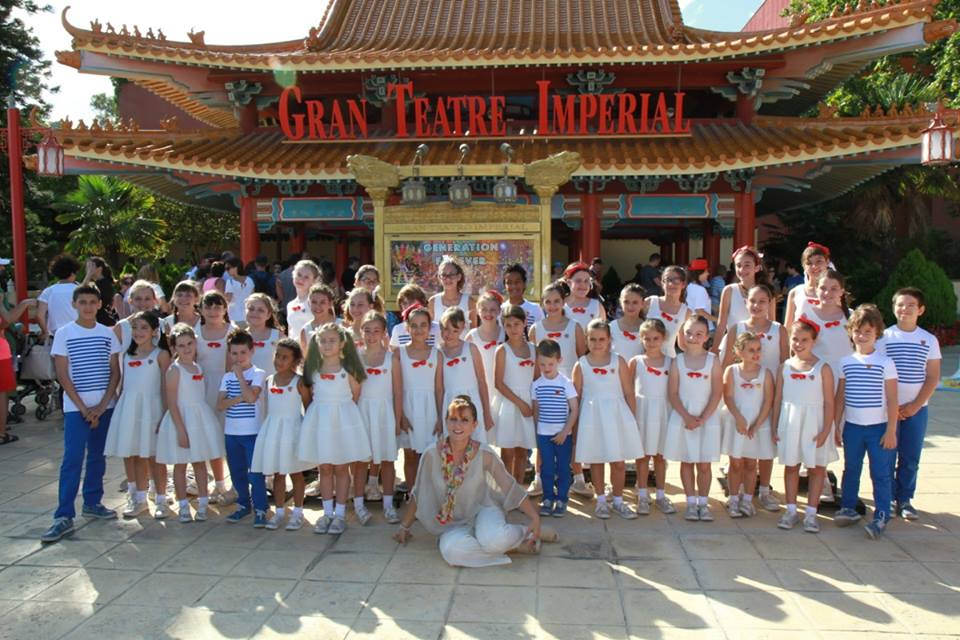
Sabrina with Mariele Ventre Choir in Barcelona, 2014
