= National Right =

National Right may refer to:

- New Italian Social Movement, known as "National Right" (Destra Nazionale) from 2000 to 2003
- National Right (Liberal Party of Australia), party faction
