= Topo Gigio (2020 TV series) =

2020 animated television series based on Italian character

- Genre: Comedy; Adventure
- Created by: Maria Perego; Mike de Sève; Fabrizio Margaria; Davide Rosio; Giorgio Scorza
- Based on: Topo Gigio by Maria Perego
- Directed by: Davide Rosio; Giorgio Scorza
- Voices of: Roly Gutierrez; Jackie Rodriguez; Kevin Rodriguez; Rosana Smith-Alvarez; Daniel Cortes; Isis Cristal Leyva; Mauriett Chayeb
- Theme music composer: Diego Maggi
- Composers: Diego Maggi; Antonello Aguzzi
- Country of origin: Italy
- Original language: English
- No. of seasons: 1
- No. of episodes: 52

Production
- Producer: Cecilia Quattrini (RAI)
- Running time: 11 minutes
- Production companies: Topo Gigio s.r.l.; Movimenti Production

Original release
- Network: Rai 2, Rai Gulp
- Release: October 5, 2020 (Note: Two episodes of the show were released early in English in October 2019 on Vimeo, and 13 episodes of the show were released early in Italian on April 8, 2020 on RaiPlay.) – present

Topo Gigio is an Italian animated children's television series produced by Topo Gigio s.r.l. and Movimenti Production for Rai Ragazzi. It premiered on Rai Gulp on October 5, 2020. The series is based on the 1958 character of the same name by Maria Perego; this is the last project for the franchise she had worked on, with her husband, before her death in 2019.

This marks the second television series for Topo Gigio to be produced, following the 1988 anime series.

== Plot ==
Topo Gigio follows the adventures of the title character. Accompanying him are his best friend Zoe, a little girl who helps to make things right, his buddy Bike Bob, who he rides with in the Italian city of Townville, and the G-Team (Mole, Pigeon, Bunny Twins, Turtle, and Toad) — which is a pair of cute critters who only Gigio can understand — who he can call upon using his Gigio Watch. Together, they make it their mission to solve any problem in the city of Townville, travelling with the help of the G-Bus that Bob built.

== Characters ==
=== Main ===
- Topo Gigio defines the concept of unique. People on the street might look at him suspiciously - who is this? A child, a mouse? But his friends appreciate him for his enthusiasm and his fresh outlook. Because Gigio can see everything from another perspective and manages to pull everyone into his crazy adventures. To Gigio everything is new! He is among the most naïfs characters on the planet... yet, he is supremely confident: when he has an idea, he may be 100%, but that does not deter him! Gigio is an adorable charmer, he can melt a person's heart by whipping out his guitar and crooning a ballad. But below the surface, what he really needs is to be cuddled and kissed! Overall, he is a unique, free-spirited, very enthusiastic and confident mouse, even when he does not have any experience or capability. He wears a blue and white striped shirt, blue jeans and red sneakers. At the end of each adventure, he has only one request: "Kiss me goodnight and... Hug me 'til I pop!". He is voiced by Roly Gutierrez in English, and Claudio Moneta in Italian. Unlike Topo Gigio’s prior English appearances, he does not speak with an Italian accent in the dub.
- Zoe is a redheaded 9-year-old girl who is Gigio's best friend and the perfect counterbalance to his free-spirited outlook. Where Gigio is spontaneous and carefree, Zoe is structured and certain. She makes a list of "how to do it properly" rules for almost everything. Her life was totally under control until Topo Gigio arrived (still, much less fun!). Zoe is curious, she loves new things (mostly SCIENTIFIC new things). She desires to be the best at everything and she loves to prove how smart she is. However, her need for perfection sometimes turns her into an over-achieving mega-klutz. Zoe deeply loves Gigio. They complement each other. She is a knowledgeable teacher, and he is a fun-loving friend that gets her out of her books. Her passions are: Gigio, science, school... and Bike Bob! She is voiced by Jackie Rodriguez in English, and Stefania De Peppe in Italian.
- Bike Bob, or simply Bob, is a 10-year-old boy, and a buddy of Zoe and Gigio. He rides his bike around town all the time, seemingly 24-7, hence/thus his name. Zoe, Gigio and Bob have become fast friends. Bob is the one who "tampered" with Zoe's remote controlled helicopter, and turned it into the GCopter, and invented the GBus. Bob is a "why not" sort of person. (Zoe has at least 25 specific reasons why not. She lists them. But he was thinking of something else as she did, so he missed them all - he votes yes!). He is quite gullible, like Gigio. He thinks he can speak with ghosts, or with aliens... he also thinks that the school's principal is a robot. He is also quite an inventor, who always has a brand new invention to help them in their daily adventures. Unfortunately, most of the time it will not work! He is voiced by Kevin Rodriguez in English, and Manfredi Mo in Italian.
- The G-Team are Gigio's comical best animal friends. Gigio always enlists them to go on missions with him - even if it is a bad idea. He calls them with the Gigio Watch, which summons them by emitting ultrasound. All of them are comical characters, and they provide minion-like slapstick as they get stuff wrong and screw up plans. They all speaks gibberish and animal language that only Gigio understands - he is their interpreter for all forms of communication in the human world. This oughta go well... They have their headquarter in the Zoe's old treehouse, hidden from Zoe's parents! They are voiced by Rosana Smith-Alvarez, Roly Gutierrez, and Daniel Cortes.
  - The Bunny Twins are never apart from each other (they never have been and they never would be). They are quite clever, and, most of all... they are cute and coy! This is very useful when they have to distract a group of people (or parents!) while sneaking into a building. They are a dynamic duo who are treated like a unit on one end, and at the same time, they are just a bit competitive with each other. The male bunny is orange, and the female bunny is light purple. Voiced by Isis Cristal Leyva & Mauriett Chayeb.
  - Mole is Gigio's first mate and sidekick, who is eager to do whatever he asks, if anything. He just cannot stop laughing. He cannot see anything without his glasses, and he actually loves wearing glasses (he tries on every pair of glasses he encounters) but he digs fast with his paws and he can move so rapidly that one does not even notice he has moved.
  - Pigeon has pumped up with loads of self-importance and acts outlandishly heroic. He fancies himself a comic book action hero. He most likely will shove a person out of the way to save their life. He poses like a super hero, with his wings on his hips. He flies (that is his strength), but if he sees crumbs... he forgets his mission and immediately goes for them.
  - Turtle moves really slow, so slow that she is still leaving just as everyone is returning. She only ever says one word: "salad". But, at the very least, she has learned one human word! She loves speed and when they get the GBus she cannot resist herself and leans her head out the window (or the bag) kind of like what a dog does regularly...! She is voiced by Rosana Smith-Alvarez in English.
  - Toad is a clinical narcissist. He fervently believes that he is a handsome prince and dreams of being showered with kisses by Zoe... who finds him less than attractive! He loves to stare at his reflection. He is big and heavy and he keeps croaking all the time... even when they are on an important mission. But he is strong and this can be very useful. He uses his retractable tongue to point at things if the situation requires.

=== Recurring ===
- Laura is Zoe's pragmatic mother. At work, Zoe’s mother is a hard‐charging, get‐things‐done scientist, but at home she’s a sweet, caring Mom (in a hard‐charging, get‐things‐done way). Mom is obviously the most pragmatic parent in this family, and we think that’s where Zoe got her organizational and time management skills, as well as prioritizing and scheduling, and why not perhaps even her zest and passion for science at a time. Mom is often busy at work, so when she returns home, she’s a great force of calm... like an air conditioner that cools the whole situation down. Which makes everyone wonder why life can’t always be like this. She is voiced by Rosana Smith-Alvarez in English, and Renata Bertolas in Italian.
- Gregory is Zoe's emotional father and the artistic counterbalance to the scientist. He’s emotional and sensitive, which helps because he’s a professional magazine photographer. Since Gregory works at home with many high‐stake situations — deadlines, celebrities, delicate food shoots — he often ends up being the apple cart that’s going to be upset. He’s prone to emotional reactions when it goes wrong, sometimes in a theatrical all‐is‐lost Shakespearean way. He is voiced by Travis Ring in English, and Marcello Cortese in Italian.
- Emilia, Emy to all of her friends, is Zoe's best friend. She is quite shy, but has a great vocal talent. We would like to have Gigio and Emy singing together! She has a female cat, Meowie, who become's Gigio's friend. She is voiced by Andrea Villaverde in English, and Laura Cherubelli in Italian.
- Twyla is a real Italo-African fashionista. She is always on top of the trends and unquestioning trendiness is her mantra. Gigio is always thrilled about the "chic new fashion objects" she always brings! She is often competitive with Zoe, but she is still good friends with her and one of her best friends too. She loves her "cutie" and extremely scary dog: Dogzilla. She is voiced by Angeline Fontaine in English, and Ludovica De Caro in Italian.
- Tatum is a school bully that everyone is afraid of, especially Gigio. He loves his Granny, who he loves, and who has no idea nor has she got the faintest clue that he is a bully and dotes on him regardless and nonetheless... her beloved little grandson! But eventually, he still one of the group. He is voiced by Michael Mena in English, and Paolo De Santis in Italian.
- Jo is the straight-arrow know-it-all guy, he likes science exactly like Zoe. Actually... therefore, he has a crush on her! Every time he sees her, he says "hello Zoe" (that is if he can say hello to her more than a dozen times per day, like a normal crazy person could, would, or should). At school he offers her his extremely healthy and organic lunch his mum prepared for him, hoping it will bring him closer to his fantasy. He is voiced by Daniel Cortes in English, and Mosè Singh in Italian.

== Production ==
Topo Gigio is an animated adaptation of the character of the same name that was created by Italian artist Maria Perego, and her husband Federico Caldura, in 1958. It was produced entirely in Italy between Milan and Florence by Topo Gigio s.r.l. and Movimenti Production, in collaboration with Rai Ragazzi. Both Perego and Caldura had worked on this show, the former also being a creator of it, up until her death on November 7, 2019. The show is now dedicated in "loving memory" of her, as shown by a card at the end of each episode.

Early promotional material reveal that the show was originally titled "Topo Gigio: The New Animated Series". Zoe and her parents underwent severe design changes, although Gigio remained the same. Just as well, the G-Team had completely different members, including that of a flamingo, a panda, a toucan, a wolf cub, a cat, and a beaver.

Despite being produced in Italy, the original version of the show is English, as opposed to Italian. The English version was produced by Centauro Comunicaciones in their Miami, Florida division.

The series is distributed worldwide by For Fun Distribution, and in the United States by the New York-based Lacey Entertainment.

== Episodes ==
No.	Title	Story by	Written by	Storyboard by	Original release date	English air date
1	"The Hiccup" "Il singhiozzo"	Maria Perego and Ilenia Provenzi	Ilenia Provenzi	Emiliano Bruzzone and Margherita De' Pazzi	5 October 2020 (Note: These episodes were released on April 8, 2020 on RaiPlay.)	(Note: This episode was released by For Fun Distribution on July 2, 2020 on Vimeo.)
2	"Lucky Gigio" "Il portafortuna"	Maria Perego and Ilenia Provenzi	Manlio Castagna	Emiliano Bruzzone and Margherita De' Pazzi	7 October 2020	TBA
3	"Journey to Mars" "Viaggio su Marte"	Maria Perego, Stephen Levinson, and Jesse Nicholas	Stephen Levinson and Jesse Nicholas; Mike De Seve (head writer)	Fabio Idali and Margherita De' Pazzi	9 October 2020	(Note: This episode was released by For Fun Distribution on October 1, 2019 on Vimeo.)
4	"The Judo Lessons" "La lezione di Judo"	Maria Perego and Christian Hill	Christian Hill	Francesca Falasca	April 8, 2020	TBA
5	"Bob the Bomb" "Bolide Bob!"	Maria Perego and Alessandro Gatti	Alessandro Gatti	Ambra Arioli and Francesca Falasca	April 8, 2020	(Note: This episode was released by For Fun Distribution on October 3, 2019 on Vimeo.)
6	"The Ghost in the Night" "Il fantasma notturno"	Maria Perego and Manlio Castagna	Manlio Castagna and Andrea Marchetti	Ambra Arioli and Francesca Falasca	April 8, 2020	TBA
7	"Special Agent Gigio" "Agente speciale Scuola"	Maria Perego and Alessandro Gatti	Alessandro Gatti	Francesca Falasca	April 8, 2020	TBA
8	"Super Attractive" "Super attraente"	Maria Perego and John Reynolds	John Reynolds; Mike De Seve (head writer)	Francesca Falasca	April 8, 2020	TBA
9	"Mr. Garden" "Il tagliaerba robot"	Maria Perego and Alessandro Gatti	Paolo Russo	Mita Odello	April 8, 2020	TBA
10	"Bling Bling" "Bling Bling!"	Maria Perego and Tea Orsi	Tea Orsi	Francesca Falasca	April 8, 2020	TBA
11	"The Comet" "La cometa"	Maria Perego and Manlio Castagna	Alessandro Ferrari	Andrea Fontana	April 8, 2020	TBA
12	"Zoe's Secret Diary" "Il diario segreto di Zoe"	Maria Perego and Alessandro Ferrari	Alessandro Ferrari	Emiliano Bruzzone and Margherita De' Pazzi	April 8, 2020	TBA
13	"Disaster Flavor Cookies" "Biscotti al gusto disastro!"	Maria Perego and Tea Orsi	Tea Orsi	Ambra Arioli and Alice Gaffo	April 8, 2020	TBA
14	"The Great Escape" "La grande fuga"	Maria Perego and Alessandro Ferrari	Alessandro Ferrari	Emiliano Bruzzone and Margherita De' Pazzi	TBA	TBA
15	"The G-Factor" "Il G Factor"	Maria Perego and Christian Hill	Manlio Castagna and Christian Hill	Francesca Falasca	TBA	TBA
16	"The Big Race" "La grande gara"	Maria Perego, Igor De Amicis and Paolo Luciani	Igor De Amicis and Paolo Luciani	Margherita De' Pazzi	TBA	TBA
17	"Oz the Magician" "Ill mago di Oz"	Maria Perego and Paolo Russo	Paolo Russo	Emiliano Bruzzone and Margherita De' Pazzi	TBA	TBA
18	"The Big Egg" "Il grande uovo"	Maria Perego and Ilenia Provenzi	Ilenia Provenzi	Margherita De' Pazzi	TBA	TBA
19	"The Hockey Ring" "La pista di Hockey"	Maria Perego and Ilenia Provenzi	Alessandro Gatti	Francesca Falasca	TBA	TBA
20	"Whatever Happened to Abby Jane?" "Che fine he hatto Abby Jane?"	Maria Perego and Christian Hill	Christian Hill	Francesca Falasca	TBA	TBA
21	"S.O.S. Plant" "SOS Pianta!"	Maria Perego and Eleanora Fornasari	Eleanora Fornasari	Francesca Falasca	TBA	TBA
22	"The Cheese Detective" "Detective al formaggio"	Maria Perego and Alessandro Ferrari	Andrea Dilardi	Emiliano Bruzzone and Margherita De' Pazzi	TBA	TBA
23	"School President" "Rappresentante degli studenti"	Maria Perego, Stephen Levinson and Jesse Nicholas	Stephen Levinson and Jesse Nicholas; Mike De Seve (head writer)	Monica Piardi	TBA	TBA
24	"The Treasure Hunt" "La caccia al tesoro"	Maria Perego and Christian Hill	Christian Hill	Emiliano Bruzzone and Monica Piardi	TBA	TBA
25	"A Monster in Town" "Un mostro in città"	Maria Perego and Tea Orsi	Tea Orsi	Emiliano Bruzzone and Margherita De' Pazzi	TBA	TBA
26	"The Greatest Treasure of All" "Chi trova un Gigio..."	Maria Perego and Alessandro Ferrari	Alessandro Ferrari	Francesca Falasca and Alice Gaffo	TBA	TBA
27	"Slime" "Lo Slime"	Maria Perego and Andrea Filardi	Andrea Filardi	Margherita De' Pazzi	TBA	TBA
28	"Romeo, Bob and Juliet" "Romeo, Bob e Giulietta"	Maria Perego and Paolo Russo	Paolo Russo	Francesca Falasca and Monica Piardi	TBA	TBA
29	"Ultra-Zoe" "Ultra Zoe"	Maria Perego and Davide Morosinotto	Ilenia Provenzi	Emiliano Bruzzone	TBA	TBA
30	"The Sound of Friendship" "Le note dell'amicizia"	Maria Perego and Alessandro Ferrari	Alessandro Ferrari	Monica Piardi	TBA	TBA
31	"The Special Evening" "La Serata speciale"	Maria Perego and Tea Orsi	Tea Orsi	Emiliano Bruzzone	TBA	TBA
32	"The Shooting Stars" "Lo shooting della Star"	Maria Perego and Christian Hill	Christian Hill	Margherita De' Pazzi	TBA	TBA
33	"Biopark Mission" "Missione Bioparco"	Maria Perego and Davide Morosinotto	Eleonora Fornasari	Francesca Falasca	TBA	TBA
34	"The Saving" "Al salvataggio"	Maria Perego and Alessandro Ferrari	Alessandro Ferrari	Margherita De' Pazzi	TBA	TBA
35	"The Professional Tidiers" "Professione Ordine"	Maria Perego and Tea Orsi	Tea Orsi	Emiliano Bruzzone	TBA	TBA
36	"TG in Technicolor" "Topo Gigio a colori!"	Maria Perego and Paolo Russo	Paolo Russo	Monica Piardi	TBA	TBA
37	"Professor Cormorant" "Il Professor Cornacchia"	Maria Perego and Alessandro Gatti	Alessandro Gatti	Francesca Falasca	TBA	TBA
38	"Please, Don't Go, Bob!" "Non te ne andare Bob!"	Maria Perego and Davide Morosinetto	Ilenia Provenzi	Emiliano Bruzzone	TBA	TBA
39	"Messenger of Love" "Il Messaggero di cuori"	Maria Perego and Tea Orsi	Tea Orsi	Ambra Arioli	TBA	TBA
40	"The Close Encounter" "L'incontro ravvicinato"	Maria Perego and Paolo Russo	Paolo Russo	Margherita De' Pazzi	TBA	TBA
41	"Goodbye HQ!" "Addio Quartier Generale!"	Maria Perego and Tea Orsi	Tea Orsi	Francesca Falasca	TBA	TBA
42	"Top(o) Chef" "Gigio Top(o) chef"	Maria Perego and Ilenia Provenzi	Ilenia Provenzi	Emiliano Bruzzone	TBA	TBA
43	"Topo Gigio, King of the TV" "Gigio re della TV"	Maria Perego and Alessandro Gatti	Carlotta Mastrangelo	Emoiliano Bruzzone	TBA	TBA
44	"Mom and Dad's Anniversary" "L'anniversario di mamma e papà"	Maria Perego and Eleonora Fornasari	Eleonora Fornasari	Ambra Arioli	TBA	TBA
45	"The Paper Route" "Il giro dei giornali"	Maria Perego and Christian Hill	Christian Hill	Margherita De' Pazzi	TBA	TBA
46	"SuperGigio" "Supergigio"	Maria Perego and Davide Morosinotto	Alessandro Gatti	Alice Gaffo	TBA	TBA
47	"The Ocean in the City" "Il mare in città"	Maria Perego and Davide Morosinotto	Carlotta Mastrangelo and Christian Hill	Emiliano Bruzzone	TBA	TBA
48	"The Super Serenade" "La super serenata"	Maria Perego and Tea Orsi	Tea Orsi	Emiliano Bruzzone	TBA	TBA
49	"The Fashion Show" "La sfilata di moda"	Maria Perego and Christian Hill	Ilenia Provenzi	Ambra Arioli	TBA	TBA
50	"De-Stressing in the Woods" "Il bosco anti-stress"	Maria Perego, Kevin Strader and Mike De Seve	Kevin Strader, Mike De Seve and Alessandro Gatti; Mike De Seve (head writer)	Emiliano Bruzzone	TBA	TBA
51	"The Unwelcome Guest" "L'ospite indesiderata"	Maria Perego and Tea Orsi	Tea Orsi	Monica Piardi	TBA	TBA
52	"An Eventful Birthday" "Un compleanno movimentato"	Maria Perego and Eleonora Fornasari	Eleonora Fornasari	Francesca Falasca	TBA	TBA

== Release ==
Topo Gigio first premiered in Italy on Rai YoYo on October 5, 2020, with an Italian dub, although 13 episodes were released prior to RaiPlay on April 8, 2020, in order to cheer up Italian families during wake of the COVID-19 pandemic.

The original English version was first broadcast on Canal Panda's Spanish feed, on its English-language audio track, on July 1, 2021. It also aired on the English-language audio track of Discovery Kids in Latin America on October 18, 2021.

Two episodes were released prior to ForFun Entertainment's Vimeo channel on October 1 and October 3, 2019 ("Journey to Mars" and "Bob the Bomb" respectively). These two episodes have a different opening sequence for the show that was not used in the finalized version; the footage of it still remains remotely the same. Another episode was uploaded on July 2, 2020, "The Hiccup", now using the proper intro.
