= List of songs recorded by Zecchino d'Oro =

The Zecchino d'Oro International Festival of Children's Song has been held every year since 1959, first as a national (Italian) event, and after 1976 as an international one. The 1964 songs were recorded for an LP titled The Little Dancing Chicken, (an English translation of "Il Pulcino Ballerino", the award-winning song that year). The LP was released in the United States.

The festival was presented by Cino Tortorella until the 32nd edition when duties began to be shared with Maria Teresa Ruta and others until Tortorella's final participation in the 51st event.

Zecchino d'Oro winner are marked in gold.

== 1959 (1 ZdO) - 1970 (12 ZdO) ==
=== 1 Zecchino d'Oro (1959) ===
1. Beniamino (Italy)
2. Capelli turchini (Italy)
3. Girotondo dei fumetti (Italy)
4. Girotondo rataplan (Italy)
5. I colombini (Italy)
6. La bella topolina (Italy)
7. Lettera a Pinocchio (Italy)
8. Lettera di natale (Italy)
9. Magia (Italy)
10. Quartetto (Italy)

=== 2 Zecchino d'Oro (1960) ===
1. A, E, I, O, U, Cha-Cha-Cha (Italy)
2. Al castel di Barbablù (Italy)
3. Caro Gesù Bambino (Italy)
4. Fiaba (Italy)
5. Girotondo dei nonni (Italy)
6. Il ruscelletto (Italy)
7. Il teatrino (Italy)
8. L'orologio del nonno (Italy)
9. Pilù (Italy)
10. Pupazzetti (Italy)
11. Tramonto sull'alpe (Italy)
12. Vorrei volare (Italy)

=== 3 Zecchino d'Oro (1961) ===
1. C'era una volta (Italy)
2. Cestini e grembiulini (Italy)
3. Girotondo col mio mondo (Italy)
4. Il nome più bello (Italy)
5. La barchetta di carta (Italy)
6. La canzone dei poeti (Italy)
7. L'altalena (Italy)
8. Le stelle (Italy)
9. Pesciolino rosso (Italy)
10. Piccolo indiano (Italy)
11. Trenta quaranta (Italy)
12. Una stellina legata col filo (Italy)

=== 4 Zecchino d'Oro (1962) ===
1. Bimbi in pigiama (Italy)
2. Chiccolino di caffè (Italy)
3. Fammi crescere i denti davanti (Italy)
4. Getto la palla (Italy)
5. Il cavallino del west (Italy)
6. La giacca rotta (Italy)
7. La stella di latta (Italy)
8. L'aquilone (Italy)
9. Lunapark (Italy)
10. Mille orsacchiotti (Italy)
11. Un corsaro piccolissimo (Italy)
12. Vola... non vola (Italy)

=== 5 Zecchino d'Oro (1963) ===
1. Carnevale allo zoo (Italy)
2. Dormi, dormi orsetto blu (Italy)
3. I tre corsari (Italy)
4. Il pescatore di stelle (Italy)
5. In punta di piedi (Italy)
6. La giostra del carillon (Italy)
7. La zanzara (Italy)
8. Le mie tasche (Italy)
9. Non lo faccio più (Italy)
10. Papà ritorna bambino (Italy)
11. Penna nera (Italy)
12. Stellina di mare (Italy)

=== 6 Zecchino d'Oro (1964) ===
1. Concertino in cucina (Italy)
2. Da grande voglio fare (Italy)
3. I numeri (Italy)
4. Il presepe di stagnola (Italy)
5. Il pulcino ballerino (Italy)
6. Il tiro all'orso (Italy)
7. Il torrone (Italy)
8. La favola della gatta Miagola (Italy)
9. La mia nave fantastica (Italy)
10. La piuma rossa (Italy)
11. Me l'ha detto un uccellino (Italy)
12. Se avessi (Italy)

=== 7 Zecchino d'Oro (1965) ===
1. Caccia al tesoro (Italy)
2. C'era un leone (Italy)
3. Che pasticcio la grammatica (Italy)
4. Dagli una spinta (Italy)
5. I miei soldatini (Italy)
6. Il calendario di un bambino (Italy)
7. La gondola nel secchio (Italy)
8. La tromba del pagliaccio (Italy)
9. Se fossi un marziano (Italy)
10. Serafino l'uomo sul filo (Italy)
11. Tom Tirilin Tom (Italy)
12. Tre civette sul comò (Italy)

=== 8 Zecchino d'Oro (1966) ===
1. Extramusicale-giromagitondo (Italy)
2. Girotondo di tutto il mondo (Italy)
3. I fratelli del Far-West (Italy)
4. Il dito in bocca (Italy)
5. Il dodicesimo (Italy)
6. Il pinguino Belisario (Italy)
7. L’ochetta Gelsomina (Italy)
8. La bella-la-figlia del Re (Italy)
9. Orazio il cane dello spazio (Italy)
10. Quando è l’ora di fare la nanna (Italy)
11. Se osassi (Italy)
12. Sgniff e Sgnaff (Italy)

=== 9 Zecchino d'Oro (1967) ===
1. E ciunfete... nel pozzo (Italy)
2. Il cane capellone (Italy)
3. Il leprotto pim-pum-pam (Italy)
4. La canzone della luna (Italy)
5. La lucciola nel taschino (Italy)
6. La mini-coda (Italy)
7. La pecorella al bosco (Italy)
8. Para papà (Italy)
9. Per un ditino nel telefono (Italy)
10. Popoff (Italy)
11. Tre goccioline (Italy)
12. Un milione di anni fa (Italy)

=== 10 Zecchino d'Oro (1968) ===
1. Abracadabra (Italy)
2. Coriolano, l'allegro caimano (Italy)
3. Il semaforo (Italy)
4. Il topo Zorro (Italy)
5. Il torero Camomillo (Italy)
6. Il valzer del moscerino (Italy)
7. La banda dello zoo (Italy)
8. Quarantaquattro gatti (Italy)
9. Se fossi Leonardo (Italy)
10. Sitting Bull (Italy)
11. Tinta e ghiri (Italy)
12. Tre guerrieri indiani (Italy)

=== 11 Zecchino d'Oro (1969) ===
1. Ciao, Napoleone (Italy)
2. Cin-Ciu-E (Italy)
3. Il pesciolino stanco (Italy)
4. La luna è matta (Italy)
5. La nuvola bianca e la nuvola nera (Italy)
6. Le guardie hanno i baffi (Italy)
7. L'omino della luna (Italy)
8. Nicchi sgnacchi mucchi mucchi (Italy)
9. Re trombone (Italy)
10. Sarà vero?... (Italy)
11. Tippy il coniglietto hippy (Italy)
12. Volevo un gatto nero (Italy)

=== 12 Zecchino d'Oro (1970) ===
1. Carlo Magno (Italy)
2. Che bella festa sarà (Italy)
3. Il lungo, il corto e il pacioccone (Italy)
4. Il soldato millepiedi (Italy)
5. La ballata degli elefanti (Italy)
6. La moto da moto-cross (Italy)
7. La nave Gelsomina dirindirindina (Italy)
8. Manue-e-lo (Italy)
9. Ninna nanna del chicco di caffè (Italy)
10. Per un bicchier di vino (Italy)
11. Tommytom (Italy)
12. Un pupazzo di neve (Italy)

== 1971 (13 ZdO) - 1980 (23 ZdO) ==
=== 13 Zecchino d'Oro (1971) ===
1. Annibale, cannibale terribile (Italy)
2. Baby cow-boy (Italy)
3. Baciccia il pirata (Italy)
4. È fuggito l'agnellino (Italy)
5. Il caffè della Peppina (Italy)
6. Il gamberetto Pietro (Italy)
7. Il karaté (Italy)
8. Il sorpassista (Italy)
9. La corriera del far west (Italy)
10. La ninna nanna degli animaletti (Italy)
11. Partiam, sì, sì, partiam! (Italy)
12. Quattro chiacchiere in famiglia (Italy)

=== 14 Zecchino d'Oro (1972) ===
1. Ali Babà (Italy)
2. Cik e ciak (Italy)
3. Cin cin pon pon (Italy)
4. Gli stivali ballerini (Italy)
5. Il generale Giovanni (Italy)
6. Il sottomarino raffreddato (Italy)
7. La banda del formaggio (Italy)
8. La gallina coccouà (Italy)
9. La mini astronave (Italy)
10. La torre degli asinelli (Italy)
11. Sette cani brontoloni (Italy)
12. Tre Scozzesi (Italy)

=== 15 Zecchino d'Oro (1973) ===
1. Filastrocca din din din (Italy)
2. Hanno rubato il prato (Italy)
3. Il festival pop (Italy)
4. Il guercio, il lungo, il nano (Italy)
5. Io con chi sto? (Italy)
6. Issa-gira-butta-tira (Italy)
7. La ballata dell'orso brutto (Italy)
8. La sveglia birichina (Italy)
9. La tartaruga sprint (Italy)
10. Pancho, l'eroe del texas (Italy)
11. Pepito de la pampa (Italy)
12. Sono l'ottavo di sette fratelli (Italy)

=== 16 Zecchino d'Oro (1974) ===
1. Ciribiricoccola (Italy)
2. Cocco e Drilli (Italy)
3. Concerto della città (Italy)
4. Il buio (Italy)
5. Il gioco della rima (Italy)
6. Il mago matto (Italy)
7. La cometa ha perso la coda (Italy)
8. L'orso Giovanni (Italy)
9. Nonna-ni-nonnina (Italy)
10. Tutto questo per un chiodo (Italy)
11. Umpa-pà (Italy)
12. Un gigante (Italy)

=== 17 Zecchino d'Oro (1975) ===
1. Civa civetta (Italy)
2. Il barone sbadiglione (Italy)
3. Il vigile in gonnella (Italy)
4. La banda del cortile (Italy)
5. La figlia del re di Castiglia (Italy)
6. La mongolfiera con il golf (Italy)
7. La slitta vagabonda (Italy)
8. La vera storia del salice piangente (Italy)
9. L'albero della cuccagna (Italy)
10. L'angioletto in blue jeans (Italy)
11. Ma dov'è quel porcellino? (Italy)
12. Riaccattattà (Italy)

=== 18 Zecchino d'Oro (1976) ===
1. Big Jim (United Kingdom)
2. Guglielmo il castoro (Netherlands)
3. Il musichito (Venezuela)
4. Il pirata gambamossia (Italy)
5. La teresina (Italy)
6. Mamma tutto (France)
7. Padre nostro che sei dappertutto (Italy)
8. Quattrocentocinquanta bottoni (Italy)
9. Se manca pane e vino cosa fai? (Italy)
10. Sette note per una favoletta (Italy)
11. Show nella foresta (Italy)
12. Teru terubozu (Japan)
13. Ticche ticche tacche (Yugoslavia)
14. Vento venticello (USSR)

=== 19 Zecchino d'Oro (1976, 2nd edition) ===
1. Enchete penchete puff tinè (Italy)
2. Gugù, bambino dell'età della pietra (Italy)
3. Il corsaro nero nero (Italy)
4. Il fiore di città (Italy)
5. Le api del convento (Italy)
6. Libertà è un paio d'ali (Czechoslovakia)
7. Ma che cosa ci posso fare? (Italy)
8. Non perder la pazienza, mamma (Curaçao)
9. Non pianger, piccino mio (Nigeria)
10. Nozze nel bosco (Germany)
11. Riccardo cuor di leopardo (Italy)
12. Sono una talpa e vivo in un buco (United States)
13. Torero al pomodoro (Spain)

=== 20 Zecchino d'Oro (1977) ===
1. Biribiribindi Biribiribanda (Italy)
2. Cavallino peruviano (Peru)
3. Dai, dai balla il syrtaki (Greece)
4. Finché non cado dal sonno (Italy)
5. Hagi firuz (Iran)
6. I castelli di Brisighella (Italy)
7. I pescatori del Canada (Canada)
8. La buona volontà (Italy)
9. Nel duemila (Italy)
10. Rapa - rapanello (Poland)
11. Rumbakatumba (Italy)
12. Samba della mia terra (Brazil)

=== 21 Zecchino d'Oro (1978) ===
1. Alibombo (Italy)
2. Calcio calcio (Italy)
3. Cecki! Cecki!... Aih! (Hungary)
4. E l'arca navigava (Italy)
5. Grazie (Mexico)
6. Il naso ficcanaso (Italy)
7. Il più dei canguri (Australia)
8. La più bella nonna ce l'ho io (India)
9. Maggio (Sudan)
10. Nella bottega di mastro André (Portugal)
11. Per un capello in più (Italy)
12. Uffa gli ufo (Italy)

=== 22 Zecchino d'Oro (1979) ===
1. Che roba, quel robot! (Italy)
2. Cip ciu cì (Italy)
3. Gioco di parole (Italy)
4. Hanno rubato il vocabolario (Italy)
5. I re magi (Argentina)
6. La mamma sa, la mamma è... (Eritrea/Ethiopia)
7. Mamma Folletta (Sweden)
8. San Francisco (United States)
9. Terra mia (Pakistan)
10. Ululalì ululalà (Italy)
11. Un bambino (Italy)
12. Un sole tutto mio (Romania)

=== 23 Zecchino d'Oro (1980) ===
1. Ballata Tirolese (Austria)
2. Banjo blu (Italy)
3. Col pianoforte in spalla (Italy)
4. È tutto uno scherzo (Italy)
5. Felice con la mia mamma (Colombia)
6. Ho visto un rospo (Portugal)
7. Il violino di Angiolino (Bulgaria)
8. La mia dolce Nellì (Italy)
9. La vera storia di rock e roll (Italy)
10. L'amico mio più amico (Senegal)
11. Ma che febbre dispettosa (Italy)
12. Marco Polo (China)

== 1981 (24 ZdO) - 1990 (33 ZdO) ==
=== 24 Zecchino d'Oro (1981) ===
1. A mosca cieca (United States)
2. Il fabbro del paese (Finland)
3. Itik-Itik (Philippines)
4. La baby radio (Italy)
5. La piramide (Italy)
6. Ma che magia! (Italy)
7. Magunda (Uganda)
8. Ninna nanna, malandrino (Italy)
9. Per una frittella (Italy)
10. Un gallo del Portogallo (Portugal)
11. Una mela a metà (Spain)
12. Zia Nena (Italy)

=== 25 Zecchino d'Oro (1982) ===
1. Bambini attenti, attenti...! (Italy)
2. Carnevalito carnevalà (Chile)
3. Che bello-llo...! (Belgium)
4. Farfalla in città (Italy)
5. Il chierichetto (Italy)
6. Il Merill Tweet Tweet (Malta)
7. Il pianeta Mallakà (Italy)
8. Il piccolo pescatore (Japan)
9. La felicità (Italy)
10. Musicante giramondo (Soviet Union)
11. Santa Lu-Lucia (Italy)
12. Vanessa, la fattoressa (Hungary)

=== 26 Zecchino d'Oro (1983) ===
1. Arirang (South Korea)
2. Attacca al chiodo quel fucile! (Italy)
3. Caterina Caterina (Argentina)
4. E dopo dormirò (Italy)
5. Evviva la domenica! (Italy)
6. Evviva noi (Romania)
7. Il valzer della polenta (Italy)
8. O che bella balla (Cyprus)
9. Piccolo uomo nero (Italy)
10. Sole pioggia (Yugoslavia)
11. Tango, mago tango (Italy)
12. Tinghelinghelin (Germany)

=== 27 Zecchino d'Oro (1984) ===
1. Arcobaleno (Bulgaria)
2. Bam-Bù (Italy)
3. Che giornata! (Italy)
4. Coro, caro coro (Italy)
5. Dormi, mio bel piccino (Colombia)
6. Etciù! (Portugal)
7. La mazurca della mela Annurca (Poland)
8. L'ultima spiaggia (Italy)
9. Mi regali una ciambella? (Italy)
10. Ninna nanna per non dormire (Italy)
11. Per me cantare è un gioco (Spain)
12. Quando due bambini (China)

=== 28 Zecchino d'Oro (1985) ===
1. BIT (Italy)
2. Ho preso un granchio (Greece)
3. Il sole e il girasole (Italy)
4. Io Tarzan, tu Jane (Italy)
5. L’amico albero (Italy)
6. La ballata del caballito moro (Panama)
7. La mela della vita, la mela dell'amore (France)
8. Non ci gioco più (Brazil)
9. Ombretta del Mississipì (Italy)
10. Riprendiamoci la fantasia (Italy)
11. Tonino violino (Norway)
12. Un due tré - siam trentatré (Belgium)

=== 29 Zecchino d'Oro (1986) ===
1. Amico (Switzerland)
2. Amor di tamburello (Vietnam)
3. Cin-ciam-pai (Italy)
4. È partita la stazione (Italy)
5. Il fazzoletto d'oro (Cyprus)
6. Parla tu che parlo io (Hungary)
7. Pubbli pubbli pubblicità (Italy)
8. Siamo tutti re (Bangladesh)
9. Suor Margherita (Italy)
10. Tortuga, pirata sempre in fuga (Italy)
11. Tre luci (Portugal)
12. Vola, palombella! (Lebanon)
13. Zucchero Bill (Italy)

=== 30 Zecchino d'Oro (1987) ===
1. A come Alfabeto (United States)
2. Annibale (Italy)
3. Canzone amica (Italy)
4. Corri troppo, Tobia! (Seychelles)
5. Il gelataio (Venezuela)
6. Il mio grande papà (Italy)
7. In Australia c'è... (Australia)
8. La gallina ha fatto l'uovo (Italy)
9. L'aquilone dei sogni (Japan)
10. Le frittelle (Italy)
11. Mille voci una voce (Soviet Union)
12. Oh mamà, papà (Italy)

=== 31 Zecchino d'Oro (1988) ===
1. Balancê (Brazil)
2. Cane e gatto (Italy)
3. Canzone blu (Italy)
4. Filastrocche e tiritere (Italy)
5. Il folletto bianco (Finland)
6. La storia del fiume (Switzerland)
7. Ma lui non sa che io lo so (Italy)
8. Nettuno netturbino (Italy)
9. Noi noi noi (Uruguay)
10. Papà non fumare (Italy)
11. Sogno di un giardino di mezza estate (Bulgaria)
12. Un maggiolino speciale (Spain)

=== 32 Zecchino d'Oro (1989) ===
1. Amsterdam (Netherlands)
2. Canzone della gioia (Italy)
3. Come sta il bebè? (Ivory Coast)
4. Corri topolino (Italy)
5. Ho paura, papà! (Italy)
6. Ho visto un re (Italy)
7. Il bambino che vale un Perù (Peru)
8. Il naufrago (Italy)
9. Il triangolo Paiù (Italy)
10. Io darei non so che (France)
11. L'allegria (Romania)
12. Mettiamoci a ballare (Poland)

=== 33 Zecchino d'Oro (1990) ===
1. Concerto nel prato (Germany)
2. E nelle onde che baraonde (Italy)
3. Il nostro amico Onam (India)
4. La canzone dei colori (Italy)
5. La conta (Rwanda)
6. L'ocona sgangherona (Italy)
7. Mother's day (United Kingdom)
8. Nonno Superman (Italy)
9. Pipistrello radar (Czechoslovakia)
10. Tegolino (Italy)
11. Uccellino dell'azzurro (Argentina)
12. Un papero nero (Italy)

== 1991 (34 ZdO) - 2000 (43 ZdO) ==
=== 34 Zecchino d'Oro (1991) ===
1. Al luna park (Finland)
2. Bambinissimi papà (Italy)
3. Bolle di sapone (Italy)
4. Fründ, amico, ami (Switzerland)
5. Il corsaro nero è andato in pensione (Italy)
6. Il mio dentino dondola (Italy)
7. Il più grande motore (Italy)
8. La Rosella (Australia)
9. Monta in mountain bike (Italy)
10. Padre Celeste (Zaire)
11. Pesci, bimbi e draghi (Japan)
12. Sette matitine (Portugal)

=== 35 Zecchino d'Oro (1992) ===
1. Barabà, Ciccì e Coccò (Italy)
2. Bimbi felici (South Africa)
3. I pupazzetti (Spain)
4. La canzone di Kian (Europe)
5. La cicala (Albania)
6. La mia automobilissima velocissima di cartapecora (Italy)
7. Le barche della bontà (United States)
8. Luccioletta, dove sei? (Italy)
9. Maddalena la balena (Italy)
10. Né bianco né nero (Italy)
11. Questo samba (Brazil)
12. Un giallo in una mano (Italy)

=== 36 Zecchino d'Oro (1993) ===
1. Balalaika (Russia)
2. Gli angeli di Nôtre Dame (France)
3. I tre pagliacci (Italy)
4. Il coccodrillo come fa? (Italy)
5. Il dialetto dell'amore (Italy)
6. La barchetta di carta (Croatia)
7. La nonna di Beethoven (Italy)
8. Mami papi (Germany)
9. Mamma che stress (Italy)
10. Minnie (Malta)
11. Pesciolino rosso (Italy)
12. Si gira un film (Italy)
13. Tango matto (Argentina)
14. Vulcani di qui... vulcani di là! (New Zealand)

=== 37 Zecchino d'Oro (1994) ===
1. Antenne blu (Uruguay)
2. Bianco con il giallo (Italy)
3. Cipro (Cyprus)
4. Giochiamo alle cose (Italy)
5. Goccia dopo goccia (Italy)
6. I folletti d'Islanda (Iceland)
7. Il cestino dei sogni (United States)
8. La canzone (Portugal)
9. La terra è una palla (Italy)
10. Ma che pizza (Italy)
11. Metti la canottiera (Italy)
12. Scuola rap (Italy)
13. Se voglio (Estonia)
14. Solidarietà (Egypt)

=== 38 Zecchino d'Oro (1995) ===
1. All'arrembaggio del formaggio (Costa Rica)
2. Amico cow boy (Italy)
3. Amico nemico (Italy)
4. Battimani (Italy)
5. Che belli gli uccellini (Portugal)
6. Ho sognato una canzone (Italy)
7. Il batterista (Italy)
8. Il sogno più bello (Italy)
9. Il sole verrà (Russia)
10. La giraffa Genoveffa (Norway)
11. Ma chi l'ha detto... (Italy)
12. Ok boy! (France)
13. Samurai (Japan)
14. Tanzanía-e (Tanzania)

=== 39 Zecchino d'Oro (1996) ===
1. Bambolotto di caucciù (China)
2. Casa mia (Singapore)
3. È meglio Mario (Italy)
4. Filastrocca dei fumetti (Italy)
5. Il colmo (Italy)
6. Il computer innamorato (Canada)
7. Il mio pappagallo (Bulgaria)
8. Il super poliglotta (Italy)
9. La mucca e i semi di zucca (Italy)
10. La scatola dei tesori (Spain)
11. L'astronave di Capitan Rottame (Italy)
12. L'ovino alla coque (Italy)
13. Ohi Ohi Ohi! (Càpitano tutte a me) (Brazil)
14. Tenerotto, Grigiolino e Ruvidone (Turkey)

=== 40 Zecchino d'Oro (1997) ===
1. Caro Gesù ti scrivo (Italy)
2. C'è una canzone che vola (France)
3. Gira gira con la lira (Italy)
4. Gira, gira il mappamondo (Italy)
5. Il gran concorso degli animali (Mexico)
6. Il katalicammello (Italy)
7. La pioggia (Japan)
8. L'amicizia è... (Russia)
9. Panna e cioccolato (South Africa)
10. Sono un duro, però (Italy)
11. Sottosopra (United States)
12. Un bambino terribile (Italy)
13. Un mondo nuovo (Italy)
14. Vento colorino (Germany)

=== 41 Zecchino d'Oro (1998) ===
1. Batti cinque (4/4 di silenzio) (Italy)
2. Coccole! (Italy)
3. Il bar di Dario il dromedario (Italy)
4. Il mio amico Mosè (Italy)
5. Il tappeto volante (Portugal)
6. Il tesoro del re (United Kingdom)
7. La mamma della mamma (Italy)
8. La terraluna (Syria)
9. Piove con il sole (Georgia)
10. Preghiera (Ghana)
11. Quando la tigre non ci sarà più (Italy)
12. Signor Metèo (Italy)
13. Terra (Bolivia)
14. Un cuoricino in più (Germany)

=== 42 Zecchino d'Oro (1999) ===
1. Basta un sorriso (Malaysia)
2. Gira il girasole (Bulgaria)
3. Gira! che è un girotondo (Italy)
4. In un mare caldo (Egypt)
5. Io, col 2000 (Italy)
6. La canzone dei chicchi di riso (Philippines)
7. La mia bidella Candida (Italy)
8. La mia orchestra (Cuba)
9. La Niña, la Pinta, la Santa Maria (Italy)
10. L'albero (Luxembourg)
11. Lumacher (Italy)
12. Madre bambina (Italy)
13. Mitico angioletto (Italy)
14. Salta balla batti sveglia (Canada)

=== 43 Zecchino d'Oro (2000) ===
1. Balalaika magica (Russia)
2. Bella l’estate (France)
3. Gedeone marziano pasticcione (Italy)
4. I gol di Zé (Brazil)
5. Il ciuco Cico (Panama)
6. Il cuoco pasticcione (Italy)
7. Il dialetto (Italy)
8. Il rock della K (Italy)
9. La coccinella sul go-kart (Italy)
10. Le oche del Campidoglio (Italy)
11. Non voglio cantare (Italy)
12. Spunta la luna (Japan)
13. Su e giù (United States)
14. Un leopardo per amico (Tanzania)

== 2001 (44 ZdO) - 2010 (53 ZdO) ==
=== 44 Zecchino d'Oro (2001) ===
1. Bongo direttore di banda (Italy)
2. Cina è... (China)
3. Il gallo ha fatto l'uovo (Guinea-Bissau)
4. Il singhiozzo (Italy)
5. Il topo con gli occhiali (Italy)
6. La gallina Painè (Argentina)
7. L'amico dei perché (Ireland)
8. Novembre (Lithuania)
9. Piove, piove (India)
10. Respiriamo la città (Italy)
11. Scacco matto (Italy)
12. Un attimo di respiro (Italy)
13. Vieni nel mio villaggio (Papua New Guinea)
14. W la neve (Italy)

=== 45 Zecchino d'Oro (2002) ===
1. Canzone indigena (Ecuador)
2. Grande diventerò (Taiwan)
3. I nonni son felici (Romania)
4. Il gioco dell'alfabeto (Israel)
5. Il ramarro con tre erre (Italy)
6. La gallina brasiliana (Italy)
7. La pace c'è! (Tunisia)
8. L'ambasciator di Paranà (Italy)
9. Lo Stelliere (Italy)
10. Marcobaleno (Italy)
11. Nonni nonni (Italy)
12. Per un amico (Italy)
13. Se ci credi anche tu (Iceland)
14. Violino mio (Malta)

=== 46 Zecchino d'Oro (2003) ===
1. Bruno (Serbia and Montenegro)
2. Crock, Shock, Brock, Clock (Italy)
3. Il cielo di Beirut (Lebanon)
4. Il mio fratellino a distanza (Assulaiè) (Italy)
5. Il tempo (Uruguay)
6. Il tip tap del millepiedi (Italy)
7. La guerra dei mutandoni (Italy)
8. Le tagliatelle di nonna Pina (Italy)
9. Ma va là (Vietnam)
10. Magico (Italy)
11. Olga la tata del Volga (Italy)
12. Rockhopper Hop (USA)
13. Ti canterò (per la gioia che mi dai) (France)
14. Un’amica colombiana (Colombia)

=== 47 Zecchino d'Oro (2004) ===
1. Annibale e l’elefante Aristide (Italy)
2. Dolce matematica (Italy)
3. Emilio (El Salvador)
4. Il gatto puzzolone (Italy)
5. Il mio nonno è un DJ (Italy)
6. Il nostro Festival (Germany)
7. Il Pianeta Grabov (Italy)
8. L’orso canterino (Cuba)
9. La stellina (Portugal)
10. Le note son bambine (Philippines)
11. Patataj (Poland)
12. Quell’anello d’oro (Italy)
13. Tali e Quali (Italy)
14. Una stella a Betlemme (Palestine)

=== 48 Zecchino d'Oro (2005) ===
1. Dino l'Imbianchino (Italy)
2. Hip Hop Ippopotamo (Italy)
3. Il cammello con tre gobbe (Morocco)
4. Il casalingo (Italy)
5. Il drago raffreddato (Italy)
6. Il mio amico samurai (Japan)
7. Il mio cuore è un gran pallone (Sweden)
8. Il pistolero (Italy)
9. In bici in città (Austria)
10. Inventa una poesia (Italy)
11. Io sono un aquilotto (Albania)
12. L'amico mio fantasma (Italy)
13. Lo zio Be (Belarus)
14. Un mondo di gelato (Nicaragua)
15. Mariele chi è? (not participant) (Italy)

=== 49 Zecchino d'Oro (2006) ===
1. Dottoressa Lulù (Malta)
2. È solo un gioco (Italy)
3. Il maggiolino cicciaboccia (Italy)
4. La canzone più facile del mondo (Italy)
5. La formula magica (Netherlands)
6. La mia Suisse (Switzerland)
7. La torta di pere e cioccolato (Italy)
8. Lo scriverò nel vento (Turkey)
9. Ninna la ninna ninna ninna o' (Italy)
10. Siamo le note (Italy)
11. Ticche Tocche Tà! (Georgia)
12. Tin tin Berimbau (Brazil)
13. Un baby presidente (Kenya)
14. Wolfango Amedeo (Italy)

=== 50 Zecchino d'Oro (2007) ===
1. Amici per la pelle (Italy)
2. Filastrocche (Ukraine)
3. Il bullo citrullo (Italy)
4. Il segreto del sorriso (USA)
5. Io gioco (France)
6. L'aeroplano (Italy)
7. Ma che mondo l'acquario! (Italy)
8. Radio Criceto 33 (Italy)
9. Terra gentile (Venezuela)
10. Un cane in carne e ossa (Italy)
11. Un fiore nel deserto (Egypt)
12. Una bella poesia (Cyprus)
13. Una forchetta di nome Giulietta (Italy)
14. Un'altalena in cielo (Zimbabwe)

=== 51 Zecchino d'Oro (2008) ===
1. Attenti alla musica (Italy)
2. Come un aquilone (Republic of Macedonia)
3. Giochi di parole (Italy)
4. Ika o do gba (Nigeria)
5. Il mare sa parlare (Italy)
6. Il mio mondo (Portugal)
7. Il Tortellino (Italy)
8. Io più te fa noi (Romania)
9. Le piccole cose belle (Italy)
10. Skamaleonte (Italy)
11. Ti faccio la foto (Italy)
12. Tito e Tato (Italy)

=== 52 Zecchino d'Oro (2009) ===
1. Buonanotte, mezzo mondo (Italy)
2. Castelli di sabbia (Malta)
3. La danza di Rosinka (Bulgaria)
4. La doccia col cappotto (Italy)
5. La lumaca Elisabetta (Italy)
6. La mia età (United Kingdom)
7. La mia ombra (Italy)
8. Messer Galileo (Italy)
9. Pigiama party (Germany)
10. Rokko cavallo brocco (Italy)
11. Tutti a tavola (Italy)
12. Voglio chiamarmi Ugo (Italy)

=== 53 Zecchino d'Oro (2010) ===
1. 7 (Italy)
2. Bravissimissima (Italy)
3. Forza Gesù (Italy)
4. Grazie a te (Philippines)
5. I suoni delle cose (Italy)
6. Il ballo del girasole (Italy)
7. Il contadino (Italy)
8. Io pregherò (Azerbaijan)
9. La scimmia, la volpe e le scarpe (Japan)
10. Libus (Italy)
11. Un sogno nel cielo (Poland)
12. Un topolino, un gatto e... un grande papà (Italy)

== 2011 (54 ZdO) - 2020 (63 ZdO) ==
=== 54 Zecchino d'Oro (2011) ===
1. Al ritmo della tabla (India)
2. Bye bye, ciao ciao (Italy)
3. Il gatto mascherato (Italy)
4. Il rap del peperoncino (Italy)
5. La Paella (Spain)
6. La palma dell’acqua (Madagascar)
7. Mosca (Italy)
8. Prova a sorridere (Italy)
9. Regalerò un sogno (United States)
10. Silenzio (Italy)
11. Tartarumba (Italy)
12. Un punto di vista strambo (Italy)

=== 55 Zecchino d'Oro (2012) ===
1. Il blues del manichino (Italy)
2. Il canto del gauchito (Argentina)
3. Il mio nasino (Italy)
4. Il sirtaki di Icaro (Greece)
5. La ballata del principe azzurro (Italy)
6. La banda sbanda (Italy)
7. La tarantella della mozzarella (Italy)
8. Le galline intelligenti... ma sgrammaticate! (Italy)
9. Lo gnomo Deodato (Italy)
10. Lupo Teodoro (Italy)
11. Quello che mi aspetto da te (Italy)
12. Verso l'aurora (Ecuador)

=== 56 Zecchino d'Oro (2013) ===
1. Bambù balla (Italy)
2. Choco Jodel (Switzerland)
3. Due nonni innamorati (Italy)
4. Facile facile (Italy)
5. Il Verbivoro (Italy)
6. La ranocchia pintistrocchia (Italy)
7. Mister Doing (il signor canguro) (Italy)
8. Ninnaneve (Italy)
9. Plik e pluk (Italy)
10. Quel secchione di Leonardo (Italy)
11. Sognando Sognando (Venezuela)
12. Una vita da bradipo (Italy)

=== 57 Zecchino d'Oro (2014) ===
1. Chi ha paura del buio? (Italy)
2. Chicopez (Costa Rica)
3. Ci vuole un titolo (Italy)
4. Do i numeri (Italy)
5. I Beagles (Italy)
6. Il cuore del re (Italy)
7. Il domani (Italy)
8. La mia casa (Italy)
9. La tarantola (Italy)
10. L'orsacchiotto dall'oblò (Italy)
11. Mono monopattino (Italy)
12. Un sogno leggerissimo (Italy)

=== 58 Zecchino d'Oro (2015) ===
1. Cavoli a merenda (Italy)
2. Il contrabbasso (Italy)
3. Il gonghista (Italy)
4. Il rompigatto (Italy)
5. Le impronte del cuore (Italy)
6. Le parce que des pourquoi (France)
7. Prendi un’emozione (Italy)
8. Resterà con te (Italy)
9. Tutanc’mon (Egypt)
10. Un giorno a colori (Italy)
11. Una commedia divina (Italy)
12. Zombie vegetariano (Italy)

=== 59 Zecchino d'Oro (2016) ===
1. Cerco un circo (Italy)
2. Choof the train (United Kingdom)
3. Dove vanno i sogni al mattino (Italy)
4. Il dinosauro di plastica (Italy)
5. Kyro (Italy)
6. L’orangotango bianco (Italy)
7. La vera storia di Noè (Italy)
8. Per un però (Italy)
9. Pikku peikko (Finland)
10. Quel bulletto del carciofo (Italy)
11. Raro come un diamante (Italy)
12. Saro (Italy)

=== 60 Zecchino d'Oro (2017) ===
1. Bumba e la zumba (Italy)
2. Canzone scanzonata (Italy)
3. Gualtiero dei mestieri (Italy)
4. Il pescecane (solo un ciao) (Italy)
5. L’anisello Nunù (Italy)
6. La ballata dei calzini spaiati (Italy)
7. Lo senti anche tu (Italy)
8. Mediterraneamente (Italy)
9. Ninna nanna di sua maestà (Italy)
10. Radio giungla (Italy)
11. Sì, davvero mi piace! (Italy)
12. Una parola magica (Italy)

=== 61 Zecchino d'Oro (2018) ===
1. Chi lo dice che (Italy)
2. Daria (Italy)
3. La banda della pastasciutta (Italy)
4. La cicala latina (Italy)
5. La marmellata innamorata (Italy)
6. La rosa e il bambino (Italy)
7. Me la faccio sotto (Italy)
8. Meraviglioso è (Italy)
9. Metti avanti il cuore (Italy)
10. Napoleone va in pensione (Italy)
11. Nero nero (Italy)
12. Toro Loco (Italy)

=== 62 Zecchino d'Oro (2019) ===
1. Acca (Italy)
2. I pesci parlano (Italy)
3. Il bombo (Italy)
4. L’inno del girino (Italy)
5. La memoria (Italy)
6. Mettici la salsa! (Italy)
7. Non capisci un tubo (Italy)
8. O tucano goleador (Italy)
9. Skodinzolo (Italy)
10. Sono felice (Italy)
11. Tosse (Italy)
12. Un principe blu (Italy)

=== 63 Zecchino d'Oro (2020) ===
- CD sale and music streaming available since 4 December 2020
- TV broadcast delayed to 30 May 2021 due to COVID-19 pandemic.
1. Cha cha cha del gatto nella scatola (Italy)
2. Come le formiche (Italy)
3. Custodi del mondo (Italy)
4. Discopizza dj (Italy)
5. Hai visto mai (Italy)
6. Il bambino e il mare (Italy)
7. Il serpente balbuziente (Italy)
8. La vacanza ideale (Italy)
9. Mille scarpe (Italy)
10. Mozart è stato gestito male (Italy)
11. Pappappero (Italy)
12. Pippo e la motoretta (Italy)
13. Salutare è salutare (Italy)
14. Un minuto (Italy)

== 2021 (64 ZdO) - 2030 (73 ZdO) ==
=== 64 Zecchino d'Oro (2021) ===
1. Ali di carta (Italy)
2. Auto rosa (Italy)
3. Bartolo il barattolo (Italy)
4. Ci sarà un po' di voi (Italy)
5. Clap clap (Italy)
6. Il ballo del ciuaua (Italy)
7. Il reggaetonno (Italy)
8. Il riccio capriccio (Italy)
9. La filastrocca delle vocali (Italy)
10. NG New Generation (Italy)
11. Potevo nascere gattino (Italy)
12. Ri-cer-ca-to (Italy)
13. Superbabbo (Italy)
14. Una pancia (Italy)

=== 65 Zecchino d'Oro (2022) ===
1. Ci vuole pazienza (Italy)
2. Come King Kong (Italy)
3. Gioca con me papà (Italy)
4. Giovanissimo papà (Italy)
5. Il maglione (Italy)
6. Il mondo alla rovescia (Italy)
7. Il panda con le ali (Italy)
8. L’acciuga raffreddata (Italy)
9. L’orso col ghiacciolo (Italy)
10. La canzone della settimana (Italy)
11. Mambo rimambo (Italy)
12. Mettiamo su la band (Italy)
13. Mille fragole (Italy)
14. Zanzara (Italy)

=== 66 Zecchino d'Oro (2023) ===
1. Ballano (Italy)
2. Ci ci ci co co (Italy)
3. Ci pensa mamma (Italy)
4. Ci vorrebbe un ventaglio (Italy)
5. Ciao Europa (Italy)
6. Dita nel naso (Italy)
7. I numeri (Italy)
8. La casa stregata (Italy)
9. La frutta e la verdura (Italy)
10. Mister Spazzolino (Italy)
11. Non ci cascheremo mai (Italy)
12. Puz Puz Puzzola (Italy)
13. Rosso (Italy)
14. Zitto e mosca! (Italy)

=== 67 Zecchino d'Oro (2024) ===
1. Animal School (Italy)
2. Coccinella sfortunella (Italy)
3. Coccodance (Italy)
4. Diventare un albero (Italy)
5. Gol! L'amicizia fa festa (Italy)
6. Il leone piagnone (Italy)
7. Il magico viaggio di Marco Polo (Italy)
8. Il principe Futù (Italy)
9. Jingle band (Italy)
10. La bugia (Italy)
11. L'estate sta iniziando (Italy)
12. Nonna Rock (Italy)
13. Per un pezzetto di terra (Italy)
14. Un rospo nel bosco (Italy)

=== 68 Zecchino d'Oro (2025) ===
1. Boomer boom boom (Italy)
2. Canta la conta (Italy)
3. Ci pensa il vento (Italy)
4. Disco (Italy)
5. Il bacio nel taschino (Italy)
6. Il lupo Duccio (Italy)
7. Le galline fanno surf (Italy)
8. Perché perché perché (Italy)
9. Portafortuna (Italy)
10. Raffa la giraffa (Italy)
11. Toc toc (Italy)
12. Tu puoi essere (Italy)
13. Uffa le tabelline (Italy)
14. Viva le api (Italy)

=== 69 Zecchino d'Oro (2026) ===
1. Bella Bro (Italy)
2. BFF (Italy)
3. Fa troppo caldo qua (Italy)
4. Hanno un leone in macchina (Italy)
5. Ho perso un dente (Italy)
6. Il viaggio di conchiglia (Italy)
7. L'ultimo numero qual è? (Italy)
8. La chiave sei tu (Italy)
9. La matita colorata (Italy)
10. Le polpette di papà (Italy)
11. New York Broadway Band (Italy)
12. Stella marina, stella ballerina (Italy)
13. Ultime dalla Terra (Italy)
14. Un, due, tre, fai la pace con me! (Italy)
