= Cino Tortorella =

Italian television presenter

Felice Tortorella
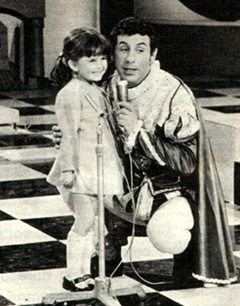
- Born: 27 June 1927; Ventimiglia, Italy
- Died: 23 March 2017 (aged 89); Milan, Italy
- Occupation: Television host

Felice "Cino" Tortorella (27 June 1927 – 23 March 2017), was an Italian television presenter, author and director, best known for creating and conducting the Zecchino d'Oro festival of children's songs. His daughter Chiara, is a tv and radio anchorwoman too

== Zecchino d'Oro and Topo Gigio ==
Cino (hypocorism of Felice) Tortorella was born in Ventimiglia, Italy. Tortorella began his career in 1956 with a comedy entitled Zurlì, Mago Lipperlì ("Zurlì, the almost Magician") and Mago Zurlì, il mago del giovedì ("Zurlì, the Thursday magician").

Three years later, he inaugurated the Zecchino d'Oro (The Golden Coin) festival, in which he played the role of Mago Zurlì until 1972. He also created several other shows on RAI TV and private Italian networks such as Antenna 3 Lombardia, where in the late '70s and early '80s he was the most important TV director.

During his shows, Tortorella often conversed with the puppet Topo Gigio, an anthropomorfic mouse created by Maria Perego and dubbed by Peppino Mazzullo. While a popular attraction in Italy, exposure via The Ed Sullivan Show made them famous around the world.

== Legacy ==
In 2002, Tortorella's name was written into the Guinness book as of the person having been conducting the same program (Zecchino d'Oro) for the longest ever time in the world.
