= Germano Mosconi =

Italian sportswriter and news presenter

- Born: 11 November 1932; San Bonifacio, Italy
- Died: 1 March 2012 (aged 79); Verona, Italy
- Burial place: Cemetery of Pavia
- Occupations: Sports journalist; anchorman
- Known for: Internet celebrity
- Height: 1.88 m (6 ft 2 in)

Germano Mosconi (11 November 1932 – 1 March 2012) was an Italian sportswriter, news presenter and a television personality.

== Biography ==
Mosconi, who was born in San Bonifacio, was a well-known television personality in northern Italy due to his sportscasting on Telenuovo in Verona from the 1980s until his death in early March 2012. In 1982 he received the Cesare d'Oro international award for journalist merit.

Late in life, Mosconi became an unwilling Internet celebrity: during the end of 2005, he was the subject of an anonymous Internet video that made him known all over Italy. The video shows some of his off-air bloopers, featuring his irate reactions to various problems (people unexpectedly entering the studio, various noises, illegible writing on the news sheets he receives, or simply his lapsus linguae).

Such use of swearwords, blasphemy, insults and other rude language both in Venetian and Italian, as well as other humorous antics, have made this video into a viral video. Very quickly, many Internet forums discussing Mosconi appeared, as well as fan clubs in Italy and in other countries, and comic cartoons featuring Mosconi's voice. Despite the use of swearing and blasphemy being a common trait of several regions of Italy (including the northeast where Mosconi lived), deeply intertwined with local traditions and dialects, it is still usually frowned upon in formal (i.e. television) settings. Because of this, Mosconi was not receptive to this fame, declining every interview or proposal related to the video.

Mosconi was also an editor of the German-language magazine Gardasee Zeitung, dedicated to tourists of Lake Garda, and he was also a reviewer for the sportscasts on Telechiara in Padua (ironically, this channel is owned by the Triveneto episcopate). He also wrote for Il Gazzettino and L'Arena in Verona.

As of February 2005, Mosconi worked as a member of the Hellas Verona football club's staff, but he later left this position in August of the same year.

Mosconi died in Verona on 1 March 2012 at the age of 79, following a lengthy illness.

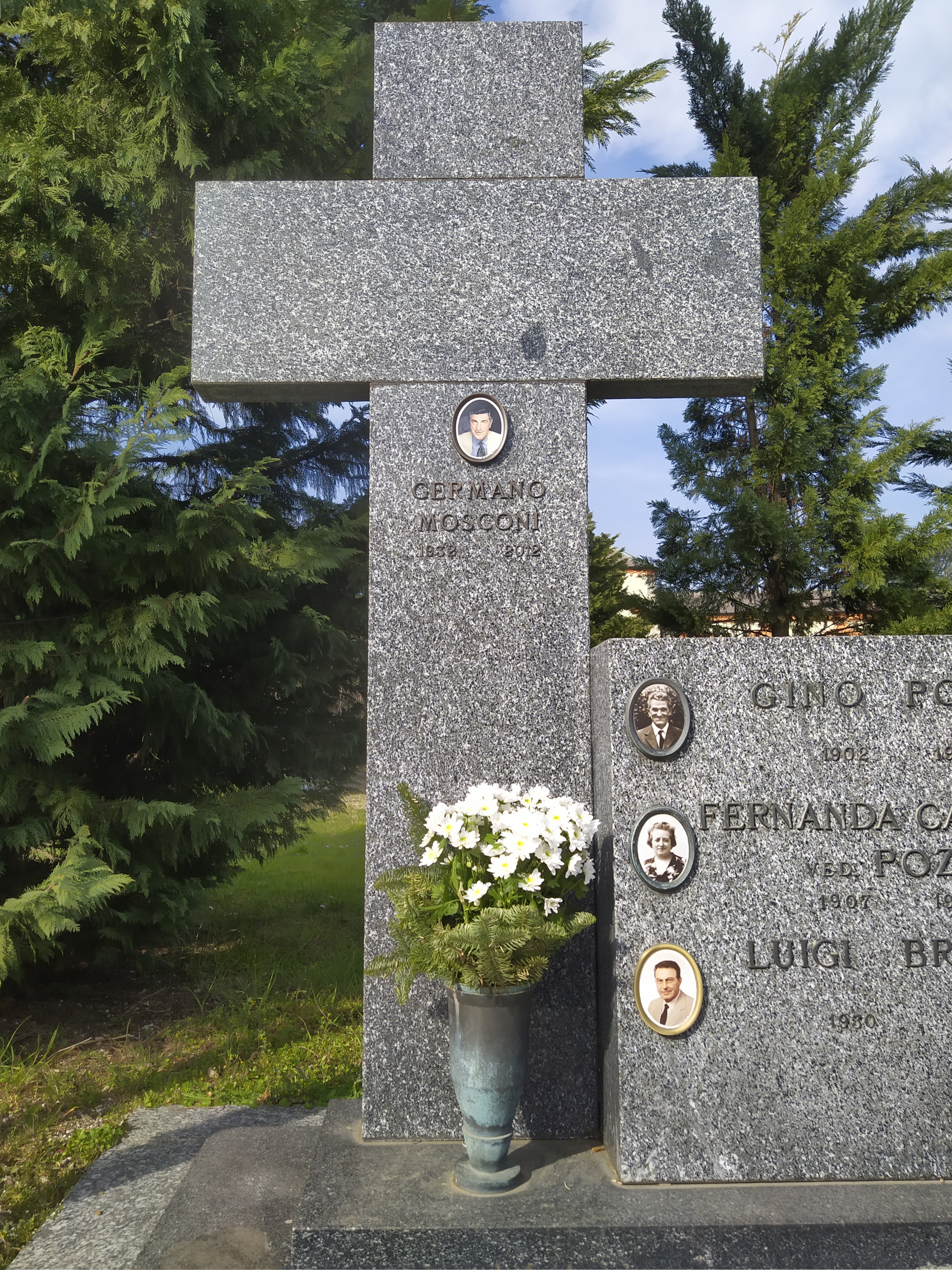
Germano Mosconi's tomb

He was buried two days later on 3 March 2012 in the cemetery of Pavia.

== Honours ==
- Cesare d'Oro: 1982

== See also ==
- Telenuovo
- Tele Arena
