= Peppino Mazzullo =

Italian actor and voice actor (1926–2026)

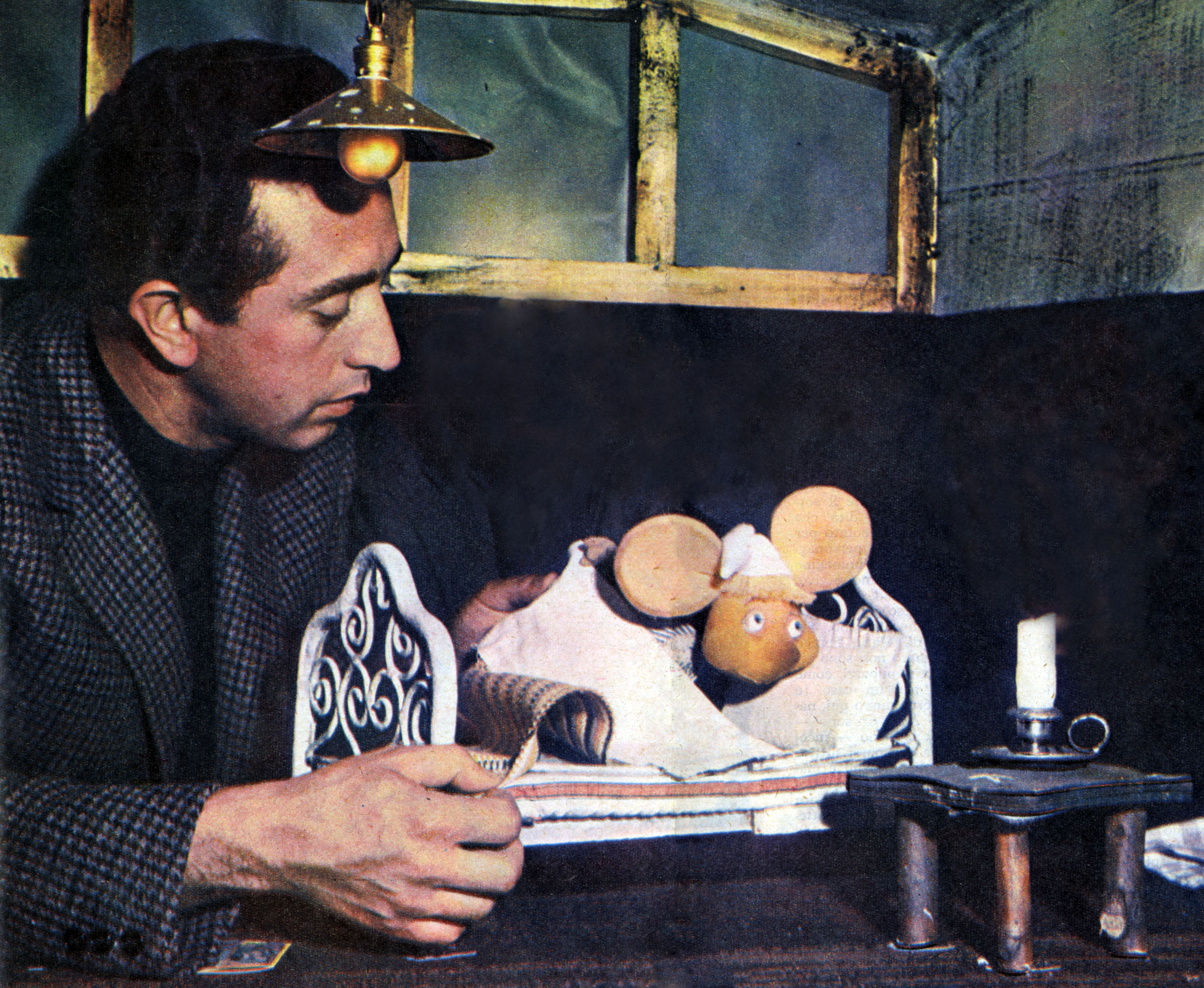
- Mazzullo and Topo Gigio in 1961
- Born: Giuseppe Mazzullo; 6 June 1926; Santo Stefano di Briga, Italy
- Died: 30 September 2026 (aged 100); Santo Stefano di Briga, Italy
- Education: Accademia d'Arte Cinematografica di Roma Accademia d'Arte Drammatica di Milano
- Occupation: Voice actor
- Years active: 1950–2026
- Known for: Voice of Topo Gigio

Giuseppe "Peppino" Mazzullo (6 June 1926 – 30 September 2026) was an Italian actor and voice actor, best known for giving his voice to the beloved puppet character Topo Gigio from 1961 until 2006. His career spanned theatre, radio, and television, making him a recognisable figure in Italian entertainment.

== Early life and education ==
Mazzullo was born as Giuseppe Mazzullo in the village of Santo Stefano di Briga near Messina; he began his artistic journey at a young age. He first performed at the Teatro Auditorium San Gaetano under the guidance of Placido Andriolo, who wrote monologues specifically for him. His talent earned him scholarships to study at the Accademia d'Arte Cinematografica di Roma and the Accademia d'Arte Drammatica di Milano.

== Career ==
=== Theatre and radio ===
From the 1950s onward, Mazzullo worked with several theatre companies, including those led by Guglielmo Della Seta and Enzo Ferrieri. He became a prominent actor in Milanese theatres such as the Angelicum, where productions like Le avventure di Pinocchio were broadcast. He also participated in RAI's prose radio programs, performing in works by Roberto Bracco, Cesare Meano, Anton Chekhov, and Sabatino Lopez.

=== Voice acting and Topo Gigio ===
Mazzullo achieved widespread fame as the voice of Topo Gigio, the puppet created by Maria Perego. Beginning in 1961, he voiced the character for more than four decades, until 2006. His warm and distinctive voice became inseparable from the puppet's identity, contributing to Topo Gigio's popularity in Italy and abroad. He also appeared in Zecchino d’Oro shows during the 1960s, portraying Richetto, a comical schoolboy character.

== Later life and death ==
In 2004, Mazzullo returned to Messina and founded the Piccolissimo Teatro di Messina, where he directed a school of comic and dramatic theatre. He received several awards, including the Leggìo d'Oro Voce Cartoon in 2008 and the Premio alla voce dei ricordi in 2011. In 2016, he produced an audiovisual project inspired by Dante and Beatrice, which was re-presented in 2026, featuring young actors and his own narration.

After his retirement, Mazzullo returned to live in Santo Stefano di Briga, where he died on 30 September 2026, at the age of 100.
