= Topo Gigio and the Missile War =

- Japanese theatrical poster
- Directed by: Kon Ichikawa
- Written by: Federico Caldura; Rokusuke Ei; Kon Ichikawa; Alberto Ongarp
- Release date: July 20, 1967 (Japan)
- Running time: 92 minutes
- Countries: Japan; Italy
- Language: Japanese

Topo Gigio and the Missile War (トッポ・ジージョのボタン戦争, Toppo Jijio no botan sensō) is a 1967 film directed by Kon Ichikawa. It features the Italian television puppet mouse character, Topo Gigio.
