= Topo Gigio =

Italian television character

- Topo Gigio on a DVD cover for Topo Gigio and Friends
- First appearance: Serata di gala (1959)
- Created by: Maria Perego
- Performed by: Domenico Modugno (1959–1960); Peppino Mazzullo (1961–2006); Davide Garbolino (2004–2009); Claudio Moneta (Topo Gigio)

In-universe information
- Species: Mouse
- Gender: Male
- Nationality: Italian

Topo Gigio (Italian pronunciation: [ˈtɔːpo ˈdʒiːdʒo]) is a fictional anthropomorphic mouse, originally the lead character of a children's puppet show on Italian television in the early 1960s. The character, created in 1958 by artist Maria Perego, her husband Federico Caldura and fellow artist Guido Stagnaro, debuted on RAI in 1959 and has been customarily voiced by actor Giuseppe "Peppino" Mazzullo and later Davide Garbolino. His name literally translates to 'Louie Mouse', as topo is the Italian word for 'mouse' and Gigio is a nickname for Luigi ('Louis').

Topo Gigio was popular in Italy for many years: not only on TV, but also in comics, such as the classical Corriere dei Piccoli, cartoons, merchandising and films. The character's popularity spread around the world after being featured on The Ed Sullivan Show in the U.S. in 1962.

Today, Topo Gigio still has fans and has become an icon of Italian pop culture. He performs regularly at Zecchino d'Oro festival and other programs created by Antoniano and RAI. The character also spawned two feature-length films, The Magic World of Topo Gigio (1961) and Topo Gigio and the Missile War (1967), and two eponymous animated TV series that first aired in 1988 and in 2020, respectively.

The puppet has made appearances and has a fan base in many other countries—including Argentina, Bolivia, Brazil, Chile, Colombia, Costa Rica, Dominican Republic, El Salvador, Ecuador, Guatemala, Japan, Mexico, Nicaragua, Honduras, Panama, Paraguay, Peru, Portugal, Puerto Rico, Romania, Spain, Uruguay, Venezuela and the former Yugoslavia.

== Dedicated media ==
=== Television ===
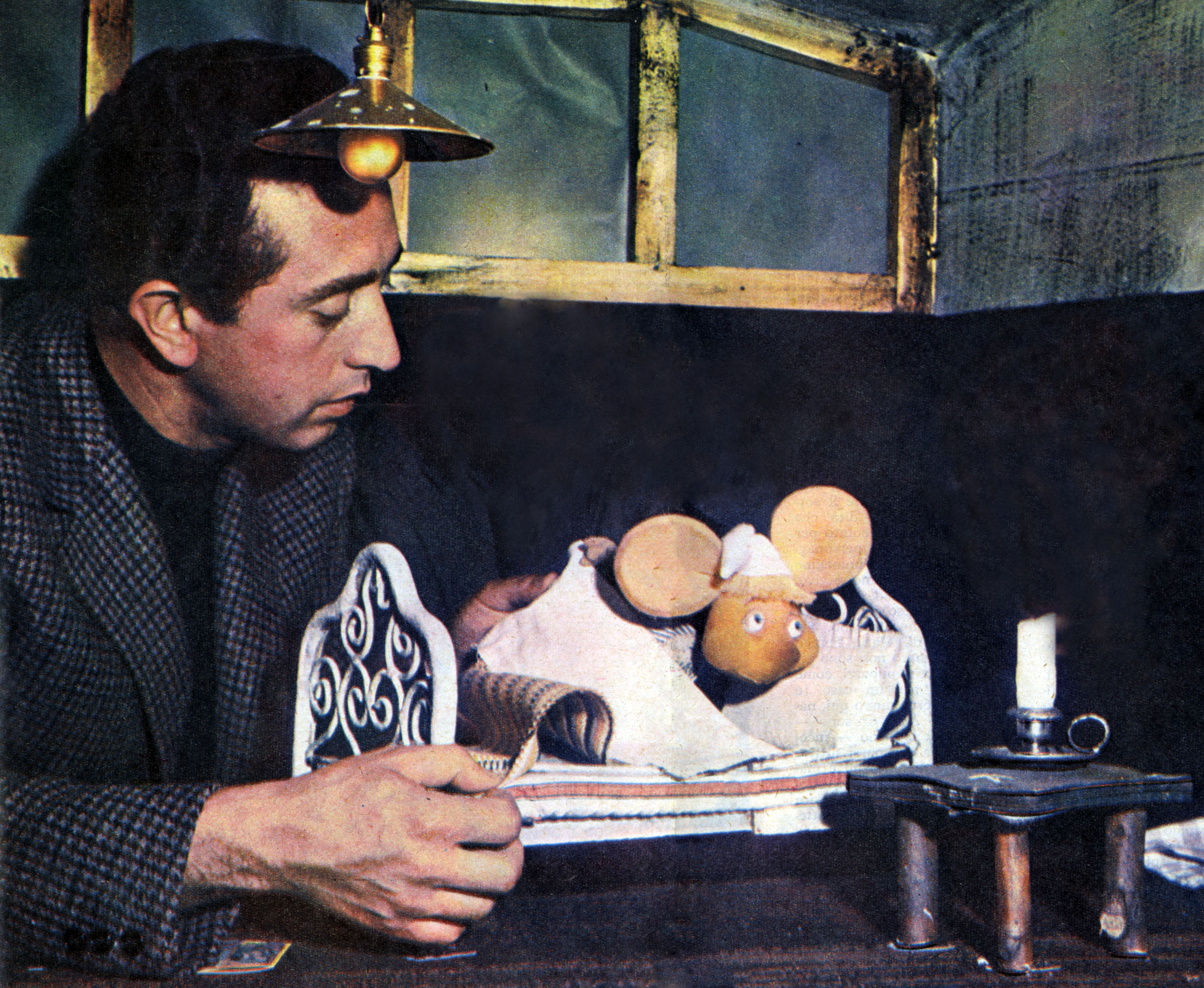
Peppino Mazzullo voiced the character in Italian from 1961 until 2006

- Topo Gigio was created in 1958 by the artist "Madame" Maria Perego and Guido Stagnaro, and starred in a children's television show in Italy in the early 1960s. He remains a fixture of Italian pop culture and still performs regularly at festivals in Italy.
- Topo Gigio was immensely popular in his home country and became a worldwide sensation after his recurring appearances, beginning in 1962, on The Ed Sullivan Show, in the United States. Created by a troupe of Italian puppeteers, it took four people to bring the 10-inch-tall (25 cm) character to life: three to manipulate him, and one to create his voice; the original Italian team came to New York for each performance. The puppet stood in a special "limbo" black art stage with black velvet curtains, designed to absorb as much ambient light as possible, which helped hide the puppeteers, who were also dressed in black from head to toe. Each puppeteer operated a different part of Gigio's foam rubber body by using several wooden dowel rods (also painted black). The illusion was quite remarkable, since unlike traditional hand puppets, Topo Gigio could actually appear to walk on his feet, sing, make subtle hand gestures, and even walk up Ed Sullivan's arm and perch on his shoulder—an act that Sullivan found endearing and stated that it felt more authentic than any other puppet act he had ever experienced. Careful lighting and TV camera adjustment made the "black art" illusion perfect for the television audience, though on at least one appearance, Ed asked the puppeteers to come out and take a bow, revealing their black-clad appearance (though deftly hiding Gigio's mechanisms to conceal the secret). In more than fifty appearances on the show, the mouse would appear on stage and greet Sullivan with, "Hello, Eddie!". Gigio would occasionally talk about his girlfriend, Rosie. These sketches were written mainly by American writers, among them a young Joan Rivers, whose football-themed Topo Gigio sketch was her first professional gig. Gigio ended his weekly visits by crooning to the host, "Eddie, kiss me goodnight!" (pronounced as "Keesa me goo'night!"). Topo Gigio closed Sullivan's final show in 1971.
- During the first half of the 1960s (especially in 1964), Topo Gigio also appeared in a TV music show presented by the British singer Chris Howland, both in Austria and Germany.
- In the United Kingdom, Topo Gigio appeared on the first of many occasions on ITV's Sunday Night at the London Palladium with Jimmy Tarbuck (Compere), Nina & Frederik and Lonnie Donegan in 1965.
- In Hispanic America, Topo Gigio became a smash hit in 1968, featuring Braulio Castillo, Raúl Astor (Raúl Ignacio Spangenberg), and later, Julio Alemán. The show was produced in Peru and then in Mexico, where it was presented by actress and model Olivia Leyva. The character is still popular in Italian and Spanish speaking territories.
- A 1969 children's television show called Cappuccetto and Her Adventures was broadcast in Austria and Switzerland. The show featured Cappuccetto with her friends Lupo Lupone, Professor Lhotko, a fox, some forest animals, her grandmother, and a music band with five mushrooms playing on guitars and singing.
- The character was also introduced to Spain, Portugal, Japan and Brazil. In 1979, Topo Gigio got his own television show on Portuguese television, with the voice of António Semedo. He later performed regularly on the show Sequim d 'Ouro', and in 2000, Topo Gigio joined Big Show SIC produced by Ediberto Lima. From there, Ediberto gained the rights to the character in the Arab World, with negotiations to bring it to a variety show on MBC1 in 2003. A two-year contract was signed in Cairo in July 2003 envisioning 49 programs (in seven series of seven), while the segments were filmed in Beirut.

==== Animated series ====
- Topo Gigio, an anime television series produced by Nippon Animation, first aired in Japan for two seasons in 1988.
- An Italian animated series, also titled Topo Gigio, was released on RaiPlay in April 2020. It was the last piece of Topo Gigio-related media supervised by Perego, who died around the time the series finished production.

=== Films ===
The character has starred in several feature films, including:

- The feature film The Magic World of Topo Gigio (1961)
- Topo Gigio and the Missile War (1967), a Japanese-Italian international co-production directed by Kon Ichikawa.
- Topo Gigio no castelo do Conde Drácula (1989, Pedro Siaretta)

=== Music ===
- Topo Gigio had several LPs with songs sung by Gabriel Garzón.
- On the fourth night of the Sanremo Music Festival 2025, Lucio Corsi and Topo Gigio sang "Nel blu, dipinto di blu".

=== Mascot ===
- Topo Gigio has been the official mascot of the Uruguayan club Huracán Buceo since 1968.

== Appearances and references in popular culture ==
- In Fortaleza (Brazil), there was a school named after the character.
- Argentine footballer Carlos Tevez claimed that his goal celebrations were to honour Topo Gigio after Manchester City's 2–1 win over his former club and fierce rivals Manchester United in the League Cup semi-final first leg 2009/10 season. Tevez claimed that his Argentine team mate Juan Román Riquelme also honours Topo Gigio with his goal celebrations.
- There was a restaurant in the West End of London, named "Ristorante Topo Gigio", which closed in 2008.
- In the movie The Santa Clause, Tim Allen (as Santa Claus), listed "Topo Gigio" as one of Santa Claus's aliases.
- There is a restaurant in Chicago named "Topo Gigio Ristorante", located in the Old Town neighborhood.
- Topo Gigio was the Italian spokesperson during the final of the Eurovision Song Contest 2025, presenting the results of the Italian jury.
