= Piccolo Coro dell'Antoniano =

Italian children's choir from Bologna

Piccolo Coro "Mariele Ventre" dell'Antoniano
- The choir's logo

Background information
- Also known as: Piccolo Coro dell'Antoniano
- Origin: founded by Mariele Ventre in Bologna
- Genres: various; mainly children's music
- Instrument: vocal
- Years active: 1963; 63 years ago to present
- Members: Margherita Gamberini (conductor)
- Past members: Mariele Ventre (conductor)
- Website: www.antoniano.it

The Piccolo Coro "Mariele Ventre" dell'Antoniano, until 1995 simply Piccolo Coro dell'Antoniano (English: "Little Choir of Antoniano"), is an Italian children's choir from Bologna.

== History ==
The choir was created by Mariele Ventre in 1963 at the Antoniano Institute for children to sing together at the Zecchino d'Oro festival, started only 5 years earlier. In the very beginning there were few kids in the choir but it changed very fast and the choir became much larger (up to about 80 children at some time).

In 1995, after Ventre's death the choir was taken by Sabrina Simoni and changed its name to Piccolo Coro "Mariele Ventre" dell' Antoniano in the founder's honor.

Since 22 November 2003 the children of the choir have been Italian Good Will Ambassadors.

In 2025, Sabrina Simoni left Piccolo Coro. The new conductor is Margherita Gamberini.
