= 1979 in Philippine television =

The following is a list of events affecting Philippine television in 1979. Events listed include television show debuts, finales, cancellations, and channel launches, closures and rebrandings, as well as information about controversies and carriage disputes.

== Events ==
- July 30 – RPN 9 launches Eat Bulaga!.
- August 27 - Ferdinand Marcos banned Voltes V with "violent" Japanese animated series during the Martial Law era.

== Premieres ==
Date	Show
July 30	Eat Bulaga! on RPN 9

=== Unknown ===
- Flordeluna on RPN 9
- Gulong ng Palad on RPN 9
- Cafeteria Aroma on RPN 9
- NewsWatch Kids Edition on RPN 9
- Staying Alive on RPN 9
- Shalom on RPN 9
- Sharing In The City on RPN 9
- In-Daing on BBC 2
- The Krofft Supershow on BBC 2
- Chicks to Chicks on IBC 13
- All For Jesus Happenings on IBC 13
- The Jacksons on IBC 13
- Hilda on GTV 4
- Take 2 For The Road on GTV 4
- Coronet Blue on GTV 4
- The Green Hornet on GTV 4
- The Incredible Hulk on GTV 4
- True Confessions ng mga Bituin on GMA 7
- Sapak na Sapak Talaga! on GMA 7
- Sikat Family on GMA 7
- Two for the Road on GMA 7
- Mork & Mindy on GMA 7

== Programs transferring networks ==
Date	Show	No. of seasons	Moved from	Moved to
Unknown	Gulong ng Palad	—	BBC 2	RPN 9

== Finales ==
- August 27: Voltes V on GMA 7

=== Unknown ===
- Ang Makulay Na Daigdig ni Nora on RPN 9
- Broadcast Campus on RPN 9
- Cafeteria Aroma on RPN 9
- Gulong ng Palad on BBC 2
- Wide, Wonderful World on GTV 4
- Brocka Presents on GTV 4
- Hilda on GTV 4
- Nature World on GTV 4
- Coronet Blue on GTV 4
- The Green Hornet on GTV 4
- The Incredible Hulk on GTV 4
- Katha on GMA 7
- Daimos on GMA 7
- Donny & Marie on GMA 7
- The Mary Tyler Moore Show on GMA 7
- Dito Na Kami on IBC 13

== Births ==
- January 29 – Boom Labrusca, actor
- April 10 – Ryan Agoncillo, film television actor model and photographer
- May 9 – Ara Mina, actress and singer
- July 20 – Claudine Barretto, actress
- August 22 – Angelu de Leon, actress
- October 4 – Zen Hernandez, broadcaster
- November 6 - Maricar de Mesa, actress
- November 26 – Sheryn Regis, singer, songwriter and television host

== See also ==
- 1979 in television
