= David Parenzo =

Italian journalist and radio/television presenter (born 1976)

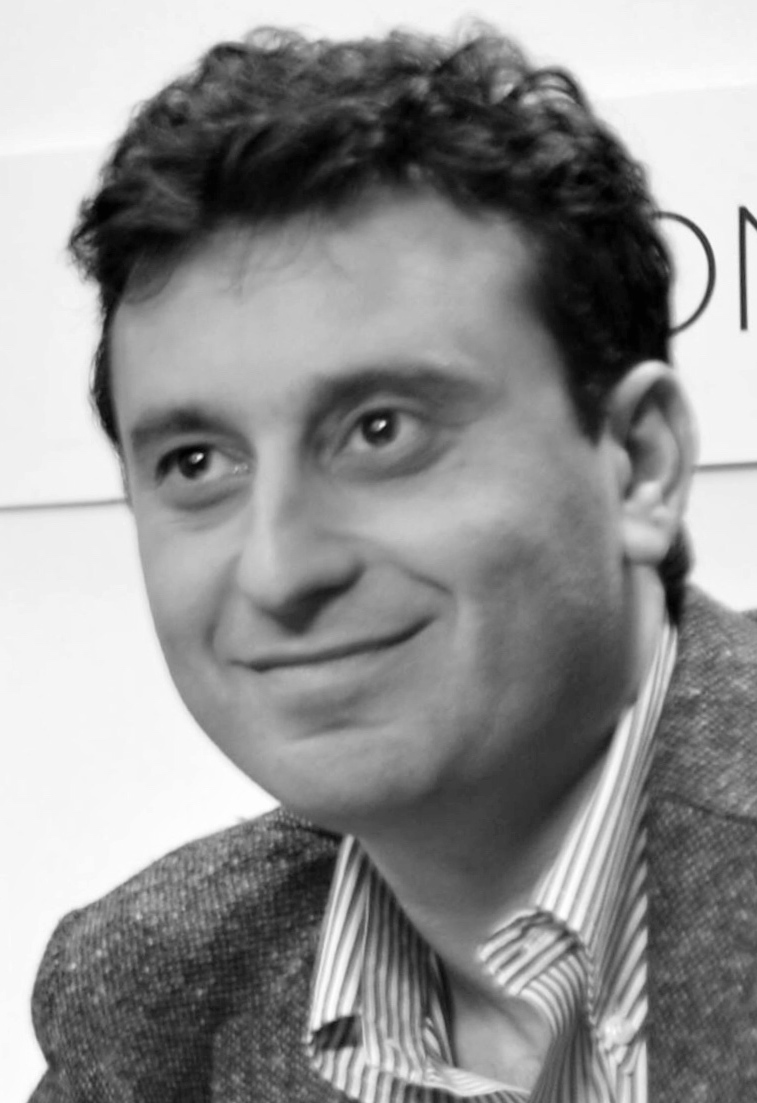
- Parenzo in 2014
- Born: 14 February 1976 (age 50); Padua, Italy
- Other name: Tigre (Tiger)
- Occupations: Journalist; radio host; television presenter
- Height: 1.68 m (5 ft 6 in)
- Partner: Nathania Zevi
- Children: 4

David Parenzo (born 14 February 1976) is an Italian journalist and radio/television presenter. He is mostly known for being host, together with Giuseppe Cruciani, of the Italian radio show La Zanzara.

== Biography ==
Great-grandson of the Garibaldino and senator Cesare Parenzo, he was born to Michela Caracciolo, teacher, and Gianni Parenzo, lawyer, like his grandfather Emanuele and great-grandfather Cesare. He comes from a Jewish family of printers from the Istrian city of Parenzo\Poreč who settled in Italy in the 16th century.

== Television ==
- Tutto quello che avreste voluto sapere sul Festival ma non-avete mai osato chiedere (Odeon TV, 1998)
- Prima pagina (Telenuovo, 2000–2002)
- Orario continuato (Telelombardia, 2002)
- Prima serata (Telelombardia, 2002)
- Iceberg (Telelombardia, 2004)
- Giudicate voi (Telelombardia, 2006)
- In onda (La7, 2007–2012)
- Titanic Italia (7 Gold, 2010)
- Tutti a casa: la politica fatta dai ragazzi (MTV Italy, 2013)
- La guerra dei mondi (Rai 3, 2013)
- Radio belva (Rete 4, 2013)
- Matrix (Canale 5, 2013–2015)
- In onda (La7, 2015)
- Fuori onda (La7, 2016)
- L'aria che tira (La7, 2016-2017, 2020-2021, 2023-)
