= Guido Stagnaro =

Italian film director (1925–2021)

Guido Stagnaro (Sestri Levante, Liguria, Italy, 20 January 1925 – Milan, Italy, 18 February 2021) was an Italian film director (I cinque del quinto piano), screenwriter (In Love, Every Pleasure Has Its Pain), television writer, and writer. He was co-creator of Topo Gigio. He worked in the private TV station Antenna 3 Lombardia too.

Stagnaro died from COVID-19 in 2021.
