= Giuseppe Cruciani =

Italian journalist, radio host, and television presenter (born 1966)

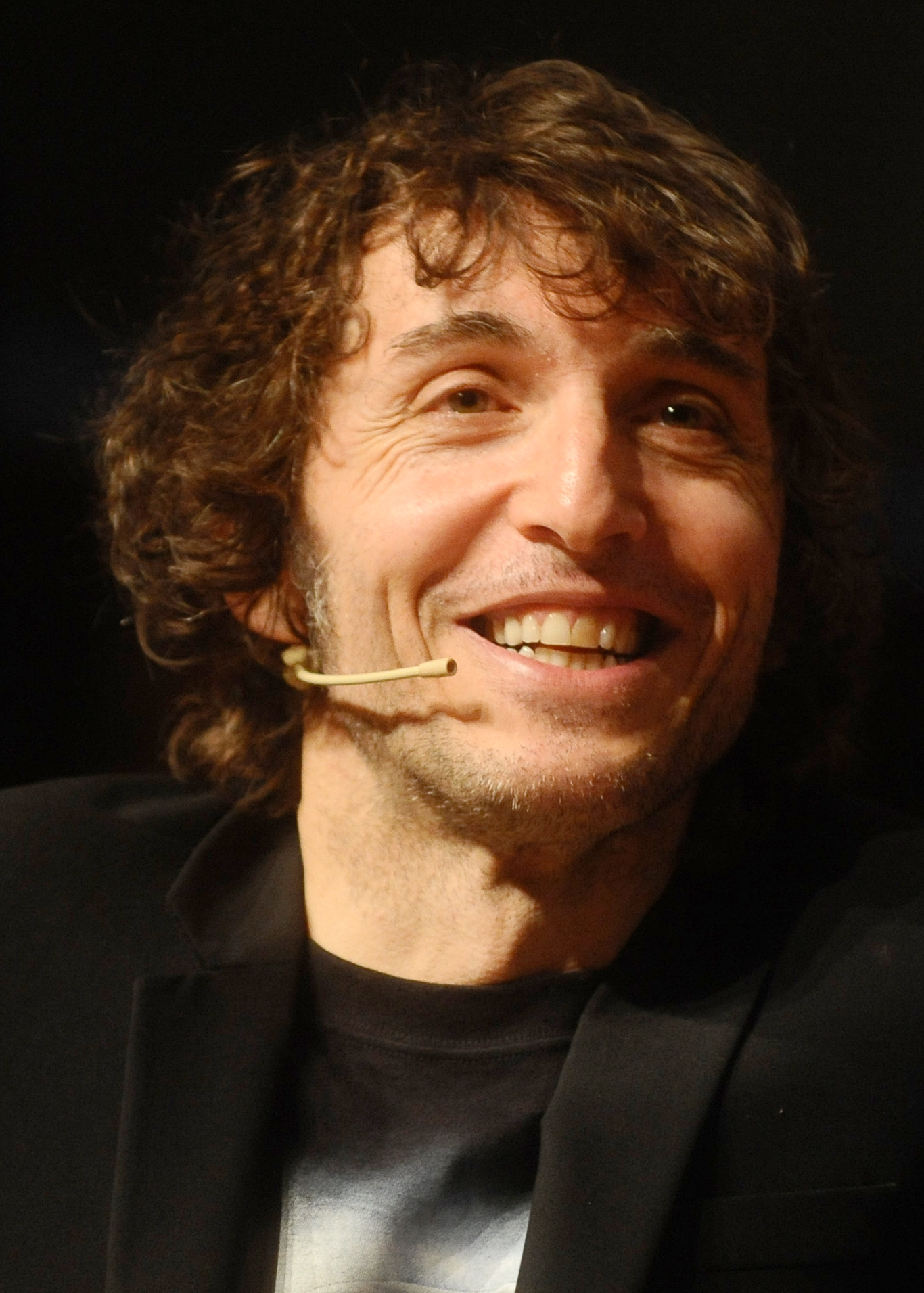
- Cruciani in 2015
- Born: 15 September 1966 (age 60); Rome, Italy
- Other name: Crux
- Education: Academic degree at Sapienza University of Rome
- Occupations: Journalist; radio host; television presenter
- Height: 1.78 m (5 ft 10 in)
- Children: 1

Giuseppe Cruciani (born 15 September 1966) is an Italian radio personality, shock jock, television presenter and journalist. He is known in Italy for his provocative and irreverent manner.

== Family and personal facts ==
Cruciani was born in Rome in 1966. He has stated that his maternal grandfather was a Chamberlain of the Sword and Cape. He graduated in Political Sciences by studying a Peruvian far-left movement. He then decided to move to Milan in the early 2000s to work in "Radio 24" and to host programs such as "Linea 24" and "La Sfida".

He is owner of a castle in Umbria region and also owns many proprieties in Rome. He is a supporter of Lazio football team. He calls himself a fetishist and often talks about his passion for feet.

== La Zanzara ==
Alongside David Parenzo, Cruciani is the host of the hot talk radio show La Zanzara (Italian for The Mosquito) aired on Radio 24. On La Zanzara, current affairs are discussed with guests including politicians, pundits and listeners calling from home. Over time, the show has dealt with subjects such as satire, politics and sex, with Cruciani often taking controversial positions. Listeners can leave their number and be called back by the hosts. Calls often turn into heated dispute. Traditionally, rock and heavy metal music is played in the background. Some of the listeners calling from home ended up dead or in jail, such as Mauro da Mantova, Giovanni da Reggio Calabria, Donato da Varese or Doctor Petrella.

== Television ==
- Complotti (La7, 2009)
- Apocalypse (Rete 4, 2009/2012)
- Controcampo (Rete 4, 2010–2011)
- Controcampo Linea Notte (Italia 1, 2011–2012)
- La zanzara in tv (TgCom24, 2012)
- Radio Belva (Rete 4, 2013)
- Tango (Sky, 2014), with Ilaria d'Amico
- Tiki Taka - Il calcio è il nostro gioco (Italia 1, 2014–2015)
- RDS Academy (Sky Uno, 2015)
- RIP: Roast in Peace (Prime Video, 2026)
