= La Zanzara =

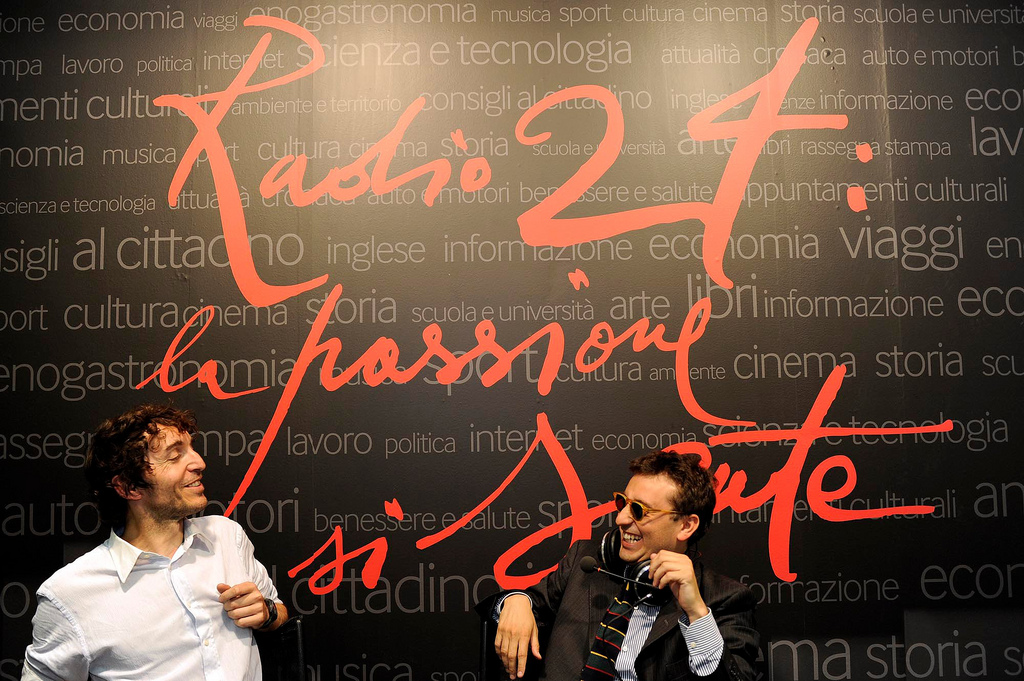
- Giuseppe Cruciani and David Parenzo in 2011
- Genre: Political Entertainment Satirical
- Country of origin: Italy
- Language: Italian
- Home station: Radio 24
- TV adaptations: TGcom24 (2012)
- Starring: Giuseppe Cruciani, David Parenzo
- Created by: Giuseppe Cruciani
- Recording studio: Milan, Italy
- Original release: 2006 – present
- Website: https://www.radio24.ilsole24ore.com/programmi/lazanzara

La Zanzara is an Italian radio program created by the Italian journalist Giuseppe Cruciani, and broadcast on Radio 24. Journalist David Parenzo is the co-host. The show is known for giving space to controversial topics and for being politically incorrect. It is also famous for prank calls to Italian celebrities and politicians.

== In the Italian culture ==
La Zanzara started to air in 2006. During the years the format completely changed from being a classical political radio-talk to a popular talk show. In its first years it hosted many Italian politicians such as Matteo Salvini, Matteo Renzi and Giorgia Meloni. However, the introduction of a daily format and open mic sessions with ordinary people marked a major shift towards a more pop-oriented program. The host has analyzed many mainstream topics, from Berlusconi's Bunga-Bunga scandals to OnlyFans.

Through these continuous evolutions, Cruciani and Parenzo created a "Zanzara Universe" featuring many listeners who turned into radio personalities, such as Mauro da Mantova, Donato da Varese, Demone Scimmia, Tony da Milano, Giuseppe da Reggio Calabria, Gaetano Saya, Enzo Spatalino, Filippo Champagne, Nevio Lo Stirato, Ion Bambalau, Luca Scazzi, Clizia de Rossi, Anna da Roma and Dwarf Matteo. During these changes, La Zanzara often sparked heated verbal clashes and attracted mainstream media attention due to the hosts' positions on various topics, including the vegan movement, the LGBTQ+ movement, and the No-Covid movement.

== Awards ==
- 2008 – Grolla d'oro
- 2011 – Premio Cuffia d'Oro.
- 2012 – Premio Satira Politica
- 2012 – Premio Cuffia d'Oro
- 2013 – Premiolino
- 2013 – Ambrogino d'oro
- 2014 – Premio Cuffia d'Oro
- 2015 – Premio Cuffia d'Oro
