= Antenna Sicilia =

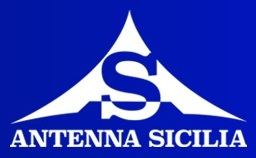
- Country: Italy

Ownership
- Owner: La Sicilia

History
- Launched: 1979; 47 years ago

Links
- Website: www.antennasicilia.it

Antenna Sicilia is a regional Italian television station owned and operated by La Sicilia, a daily newspaper for the island of Sicily. The most popular program of the channel is Insieme (Together).

== History ==
=== Birth and early years ===
Antenna Sicilia started broadcasting on 16 June 1979. It was born under the initiative of local newspaper La Sicilia, whose editorial director was Mario Ciancio Sanfilippo. Pippo Baudo – personal friend of Ciancio – was entrusted as its general director, shareholder and artistic director, while the news operation was managed by Domenico Tempio.

Its studios were installed in the same headquarters that housed sister publication La Sicilia, at Odorico da Pordenone Street, number 50, in Catania, where the TV studios are still located, even with the sale of the newspaper to another company.
