= Topo Gigio (1988 TV series) =

Japanese anime television series

- トッポ・ジージョ
- Based on: Topo Gigio by Maria Perego
- Directed by: Noboru Ishiguro; Shigeo Koshi
- Music by: Nobuyuki Koshibe
- Opening theme: "Tango chu chu" by Satoko Yamano and Koorogi '73
- Ending theme: "Yumemiru Topo Gigio" by Satoko Yamano and Koorogi '73
- Countries of origin: Japan; Italy
- Original language: Japanese
- No. of episodes: 34

Production
- Executive producer: Koichi Motohashi
- Producers: Shinji Nabeshima (ABC); Shoji Sato
- Production companies: Asahi Broadcasting Corporation (1–21); TV Tokyo (22–34); Nippon Animation

Original release
- Network: ANN (ABC, TV Asahi, 1–21); MegaTON (TV Tokyo, 22–34)
- Release: April 27 – December 30, 1988

Topo Gigio (トッポ・ジージョ, Toppo Jījo), also known as Yumemiru Topo Gigio (Note: 夢見るトッポ・ジージョ, Yumemiru Toppo Jījio) for the remainder of its run, is a 1988 Japanese anime television series featuring the Italian television puppet mouse character Topo Gigio. The series ran for 34 episodes in Japan in 1988, and in Italy in 1992.

== In other languages ==
- Chinese: 太空老鼠吱吱吱
- Italian: Bentornato Topo Gigio
- Arabic: The Adventures of Sosaan (مغامرات سوسان)
- Portuguese: Topo Gigio
- English: The Adventures of Topo Gigio
