= Zecchino d'Oro =

Children's music competition in Italy

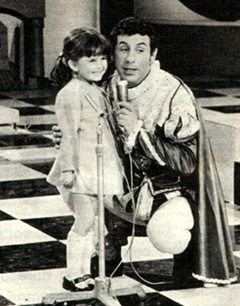
- Cino Tortorella, first presenter of the Zecchino d'Oro
- Status: Active
- Genre: Music festival
- Frequency: Annually
- Country: Italy
- Inaugurated: 1959
- Founder: Cino Tortorella

Zecchino d'Oro (Italian pronunciation: [dzekˈkiːno ˈdɔːro, tsek-]; meaning "Golden Sequin") is an annual Italian competition dedicated to children's music established in 1959 by Cino Tortorella. It is broadcast by Rai 1 and is open to singers aged 4 to 10.

The first two contests were held in Milan. In 1961, the contest was taken up by the Antoniano Institute and moved to Bologna. In 2009, Cino Tortorella left Zecchino d'Oro.

In 1963, Mariele Ventre, a conductor and director of young performers, created the Piccolo Coro dell'Antoniano Children's Choir (called Piccolo Coro "Mariele Ventre" dell'Antoniano after her death in 1995, and directed by Sabrina Simoni).

From 1976, the contest took on an international perspective - each year seven songs performed by Italian contestants and seven by foreign contestants voted for by a children's jury. The winning song is rewarded with the Zecchino d'Oro award.

As has been regularly stated during the event, the songs are written by famous Italian musicians, not the children who sing the competing entries. This rule applies to all editions.

Young songwriters are Yumiko Ashikawa (芦川祐美子, 8, who also has sung her song), Miruna Codruța Oprea (13), Ioachim Octavian Petre (13), and Lara Polli (13).

== See also ==
- List of songs recorded by Zecchino d'Oro
