= 1979 in Dutch television =

This is a list of Dutch television related events from 1979.

== Events ==
- 7 February – Xandra is selected to represent the Netherlands at the 1979 Eurovision Song Contest with her song "Colorado". She was selected to be the Dutch entry at the Nationaal Songfestival held at RAI Congrescentrum in Amsterdam.
- 31 March – Israel wins the Eurovision Song Contest with the song Hallelujah by Milk Honey. The Netherlands finish in twelfth place with their song "Colorado" by Xandra.

== Television shows ==
=== 1950s ===
- NOS Journaal (1956–present)
- Pipo de Clown (1958–present)

=== 1970s ===
- Sesamstraat (1976–present)

== Births ==
- 12 January – Johnny de Mol, actor & TV presenter
- 15 February – Chantal Janzen, actress & TV presenter
