= Televisione Cristiana in Italia =

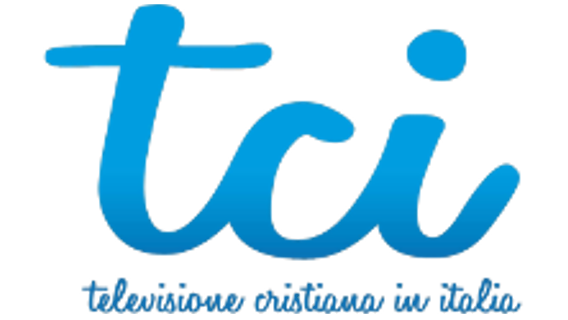
- Country: Italy
- Broadcast area: Italy and Europe
- Headquarters: Marnate, Varese

Programming
- Picture format: 576i SDTV

Ownership
- Owner: Trinity Broadcasting Network

History
- Founded: 1979
- Launched: 1989; 36 years ago

Links
- Website: https://www.tci-italia.it/

Availability

Terrestrial
- Digital terrestrial television: Channel 248

Televisione Cristiana in Italia (TCI), also known as TBNE (Trinity Broadcasting Network Europe), is a free-to-air Italian religious TV channel headquartered in Marnate, Italy. It was founded by Chuck Hall and his late wife Nora in 1979. It is available throughout Europe via Hot Bird 6, and in Italy (Piedmont, Lombardy and Lazio) via DVB-T. Besides locally produced Italian televangelistic programmes, the channel broadcasts Christian rock music videos and dubbed or subtitled programmes produced by the Trinity Broadcasting Network in the United States.

From 31 December 2022, the TCI channel on the Eutelsat Hotbird satellite in the Spanish Overon bouquet, including TBN Europe, Al-Horreya TV, TBN Nejat, TBN Polska, Kanal Hayat, TBN Inspire International and Life TV, was cut off without an official announcement, leaving the remaining 3 television channels on the frequency. TCI broadcast is currently watched via digital terrestrial television and the Internet.

== Programming ==
- Per lodare Te
- Questo è il tuo giorno (This is Your Day)
- TBNEWS
- Dietro le quinte
- Controcorrente

== Personalities ==
- Benny Hinn
- Chuck Hall
- Nora Hall (died 2007)
