= New Italian Social Movement =

New Italian Social Movement Nuovo Movimento Sociale Italiano
- Leader: Gaetano Saya
- President: Maria Antonietta Cannizzaro
- Founded: 12 July 2000
- Paramilitary wing: Italian National Guard
- Ideology: Neo-fascism; Ultranationalism; Anti-immigration; Islamophobia; Homophobia
- Political position: Far-right

The New Italian Social Movement or New MSI (Nuovo Movimento Sociale Italiano or Nuovo MSI) is a minor ultranationalist, chauvinist and totalitarian political party in Italy. It was founded on 12 July 2000 in Florence by Gaetano Saya. Founded as National Right (Destra Nazionale), in 2003 the party was renamed New MSI – National Right, like the historical Italian Social Movement. The President of the Party is Saya's wife, Maria Antonietta Cannizzaro.

The party ran in the 2006 general election under the "National Right" logo, obtaining only 1,093 preferences for the Chamber of Deputies.

In 2006 National Alliance asked the Court of Florence to prevent the use of the acronym "MSI" and the historic Tricolour Flame at the New MSI of Gaetano Saya, Maria Antonietta Cannizzaro and Andrea Lucatorto. The judge upheld the party of Gianfranco Fini and the New MSI appealed, pointing out that AN "had abandoned its origins, effectively renouncing any political continuation with the formation of the MSI". In 2009, merging into the PdL, AN ceased to exist and was replaced by the National Alliance Foundation. Finally the Court of Appeal of Florence, after a decade of papers and lawyers, attributed the use of the Tricolour Flame to the New MSI.

In 2009 Saya founded the paramilitary wings of the party, the Italian National Guard (Guardia Nazionale Italiana) and the Black Patrols (Ronde Nere). For their creation, Saya and Cannizzaro were sentenced in first instance in 2012 to 11 and 5 months in prison respectively.

In 2011 Saya proposed to Domenico Scilipoti, at the time leader of the Movement of National Responsibility, to become the Secretary of the New MSI. Scilipoti did not become a member of the New MSI, but opened to a collaboration with it.

In 2017 Saya was arrested again (he had already been arrested in 2005 for the creation of a parallel police force) because of a cumulus of sentence judgments, after being researched since 2014.
