= Telenuovo =

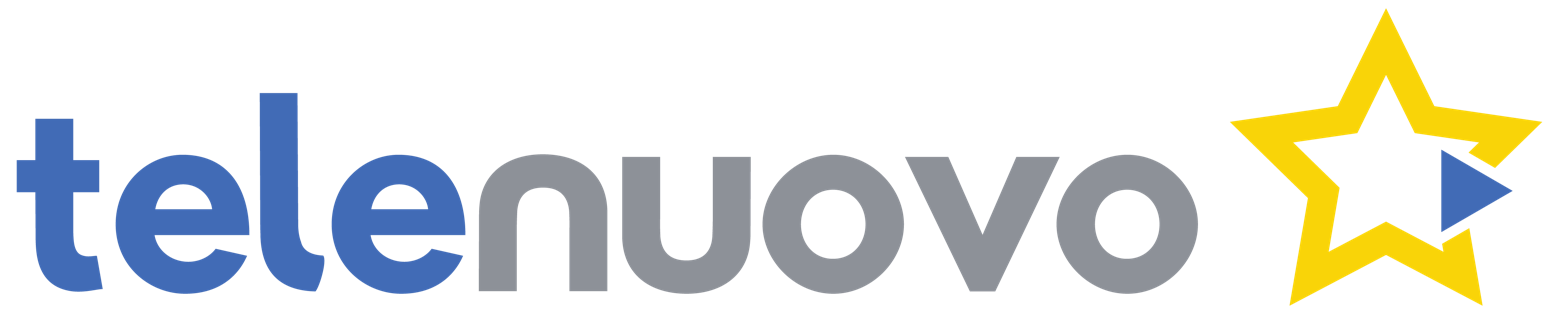
- Country: Italy
- Broadcast area: Veneto, Trentino-Alto Adige

Programming
- Language(s): Italian
- Picture format: 16:9 SDTV

Ownership
- Owner: Luigi Vinco

History
- Launched: November 12, 1979

Links
- Website: http://www.telenuovo.it/

Availability

Terrestrial
- Digital: Telenuovo Retenord
- Hybrid Broadcast Broadband TV: Telenuovo Play

Telenuovo is an Italian regional television channel of Veneto owned by Luigi Vinco. It transmits a light entertainment program: movies, news and weather bulletins, documentary film and sports on LCN 11 in Veneto and 14 in Trentino-Alto Adige.

== History ==
Telenuovo commenced operations on November 12, 1979, at 17:30. The first show seen on the station was anime series Lupin III. For a few years, the station was a part of the Rete Italia syndication network led by Silvio Berlusconi's Tele Milano with a schedule consisting of movies, TV shows, cartoons and many self-produced sports shows. In 1981, the channel expands their coverage to the whole of Veneto and Trentino Alto-Adige and opened their news department in 1984. At this point, their news department had become a basic element of the station, featuring debates on the various aspects of local society and news bulletins. On Telenuovo was born in 1985 a column dedicated to the world of discos that will take the form of an independent television station, called Match Music, active before it stops in 2018. The first news bulletin from their Padova headquarters debuted in 1994. In 2007, the channel's web portal launched.

== Programming ==
- Rosso & Nero – a daily talk show, airing at 12:50, hosted by Mario Zwirner and focusing on the various aspects of politics, economy and associations in themes of large information
- L'Opinione – Mario Zwirner expresses his own personal opinion on political and social facts
- Studionews – current affairs program which looks at current issues in full detail
- Alé Verona – weekly program that follows the matches of Hellas Verona
- Alé Padova – weekly program that follows the matches of Calcio Padova
- Supermercato – comments and interviews show focusing on local football
- TgVerona – news bulletin for Verona, airing at 18:45, 20:30 and 01:00
- TgPadova – news bulletin for Padova, airing at 19:30, 20:30 and 23:30
- TgVeneto – a look at the regional events from both studios, airing at 14:20
- TgGialloblu – sports section of TgVerona
- TgBiancoscudato – sports section of TgPadova

== Staff ==
- Mario Zwirner
- Gianluca Vighini
- Luca Fioravanti
- Alessandro Betteghella
- Martina Moscato
- Marco Campanale

== Former journalists ==
- Germano Mosconi
- Gianluca di Marzio
