= Institute of Antoniano =

L’Antoniano dei Frati Minori, Bologna

Istituto Antoniano was created in Bologna in 1953 by the Franciscans, (the Lesser Friars). The Convent of the Franciscans who govern the establishment is built next to the Church of St. Antonio, hence the name of the Institute.

The Institute was established as a community services initiative with the goal of helping the less fortunate, a life rule of the Franciscans. In 1953 poverty was quite widely spread throughout Italy and the Antoniano set up a soup kitchen that still exists today.

Over the years however the Antoniano has expanded and widened its range of initiatives particularly so as to service the needs of children, and since 1961 the Institute has been the prime organiser of the Zecchino d'Oro festival of song for children. The Instituto Antoniano has three choirs, ballet school, drama school etc. There is also a special after-school for children with Down syndrome.

== See also ==
- Piccolo Coro dell' Antoniano
