= Mariele Ventre =

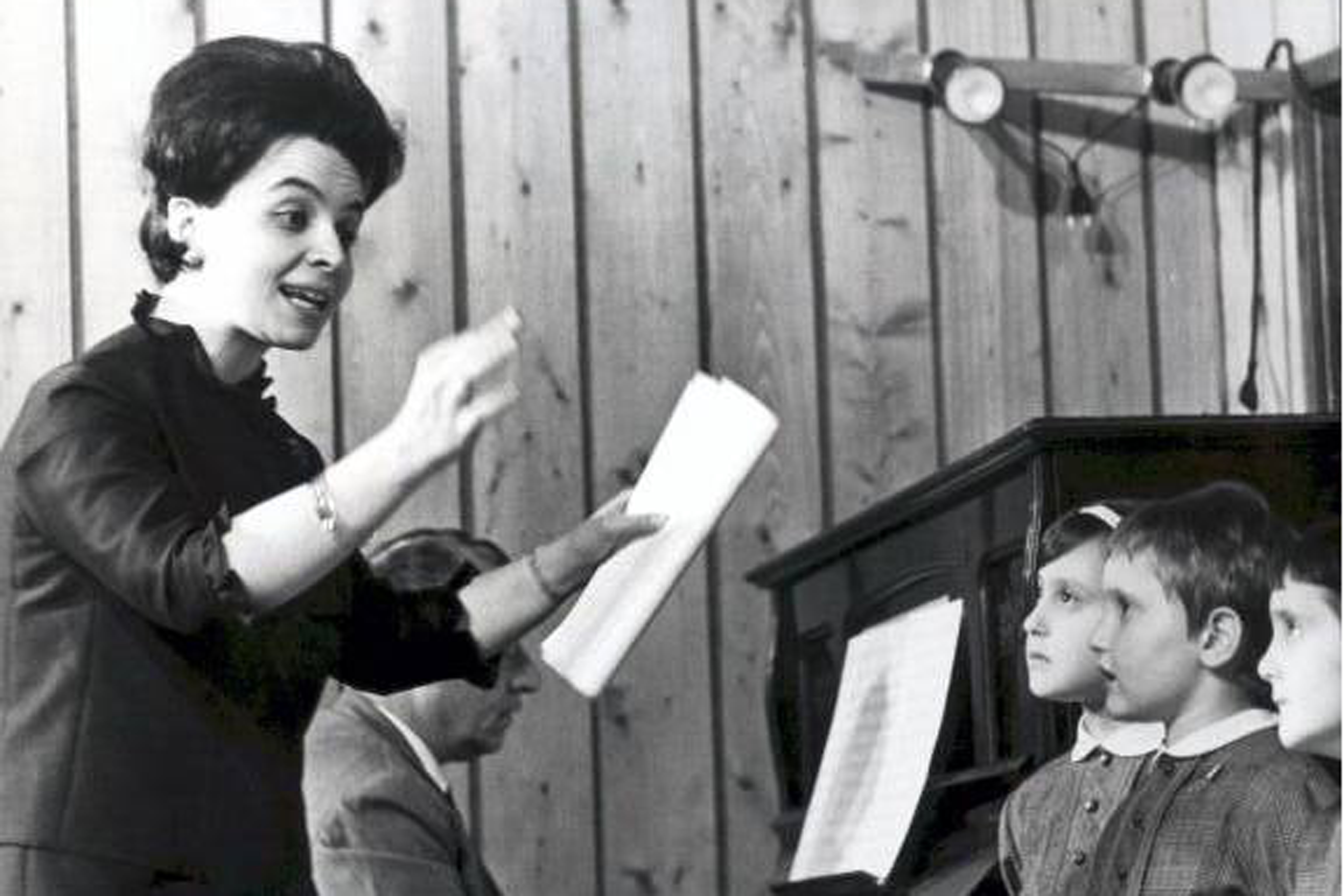
Mariele Ventre.

Maria Rachele "Mariele" Ventre (16 July 1939 – 16 December 1995) was an Italian musician and singer born in Bologna, Emilia-Romagna, the founder and director of the Italian children's choir Piccolo Coro dell'Antoniano.
