= Tele Arena =

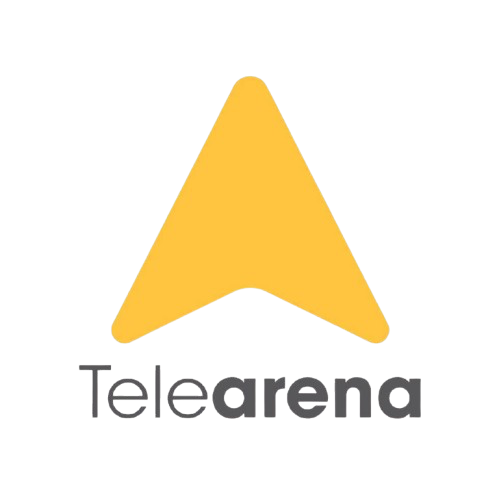
- Country: Italy
- Broadcast area: Northern Italy

Programming
- Language(s): Italian
- Picture format: 4:3 SDTV

Ownership
- Owner: Athesis

History
- Launched: 1979

Links
- Website: http://www.larena.it/publisher/1972_chi_siamo/section/

Availability

Terrestrial
- Digital: LCN 16

Tele Arena is an Italian regional television channel of Veneto owned by Athesis. It transmits a light entertainment program: movies, news and weather bulletins, film and sports on LCN 16.

Other channels of own group are Telearena News and Tele Arena Sport.

== Programs in Italian ==
- Vie Verdi
- Telegiornale
- Diretta gialloblù
- Obiettivo dillettanti
- A tutta B
- Palla lunga e pedalare
- Tuttodilletanti
- Lunedì nel pallone
- Che aria tira
- Volley Veronese
- Pianeta D
