= Maria Perego =

Italian animation artist (1923–2019)

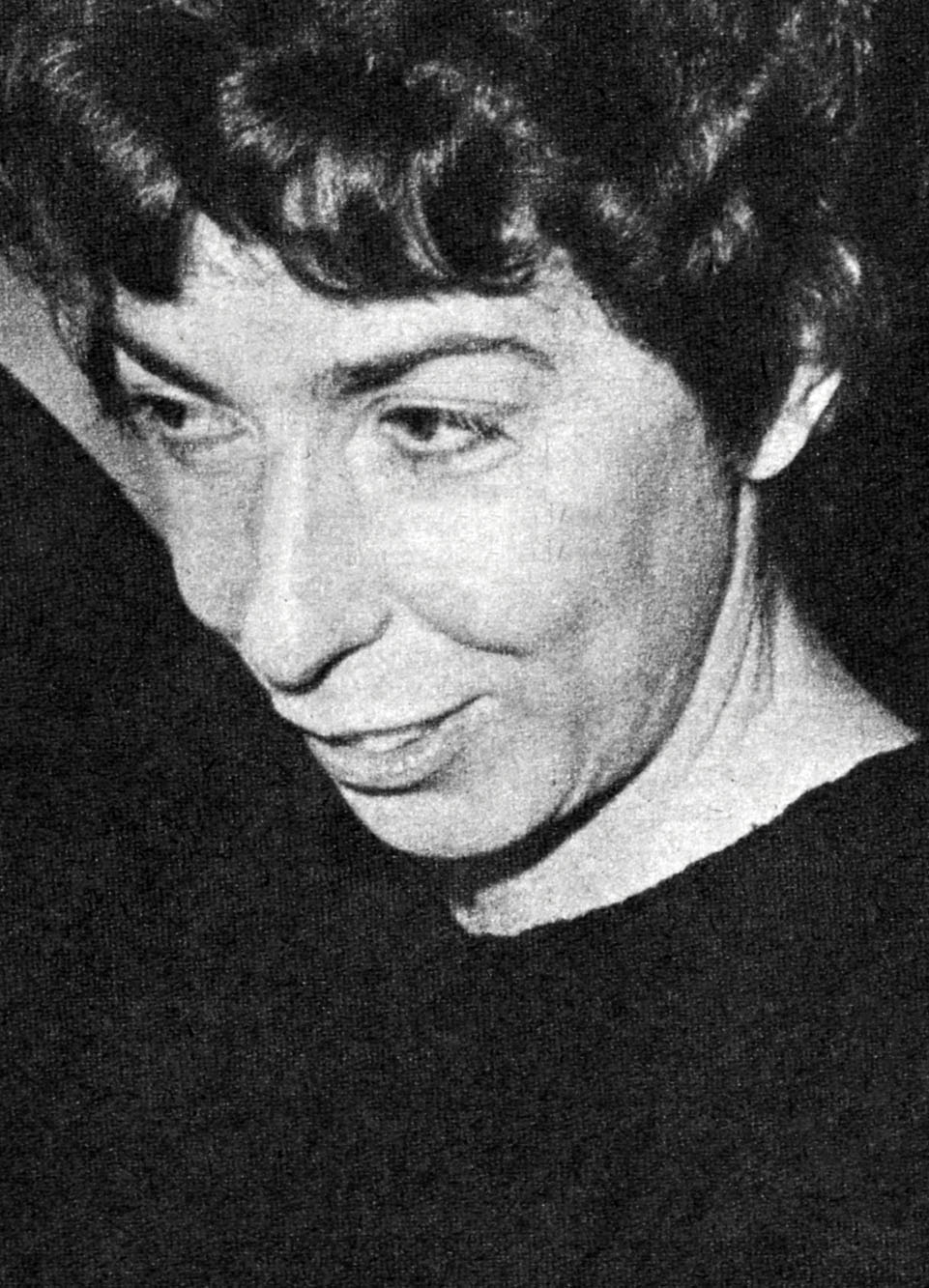
- Perego in 1961.
- Born: 8 December 1923; Venice, Italy
- Died: 7 November 2019 (aged 95); Milan, Italy
- Occupation: Animation artist
- Known for: Creating Topo Gigio.

Maria Perego (8 December 1923 – 7 November 2019) was an Italian animation artist.

== Biography ==
She has been known by fans as the woman who created the puppet mouse character Topo Gigio in 1958 with her husband Federico Caldura. She died on November 7, 2019, at the age of 95.

== Works ==
- Io e Topo Gigio (2015)
