= List of Anthony Hopkins performances =

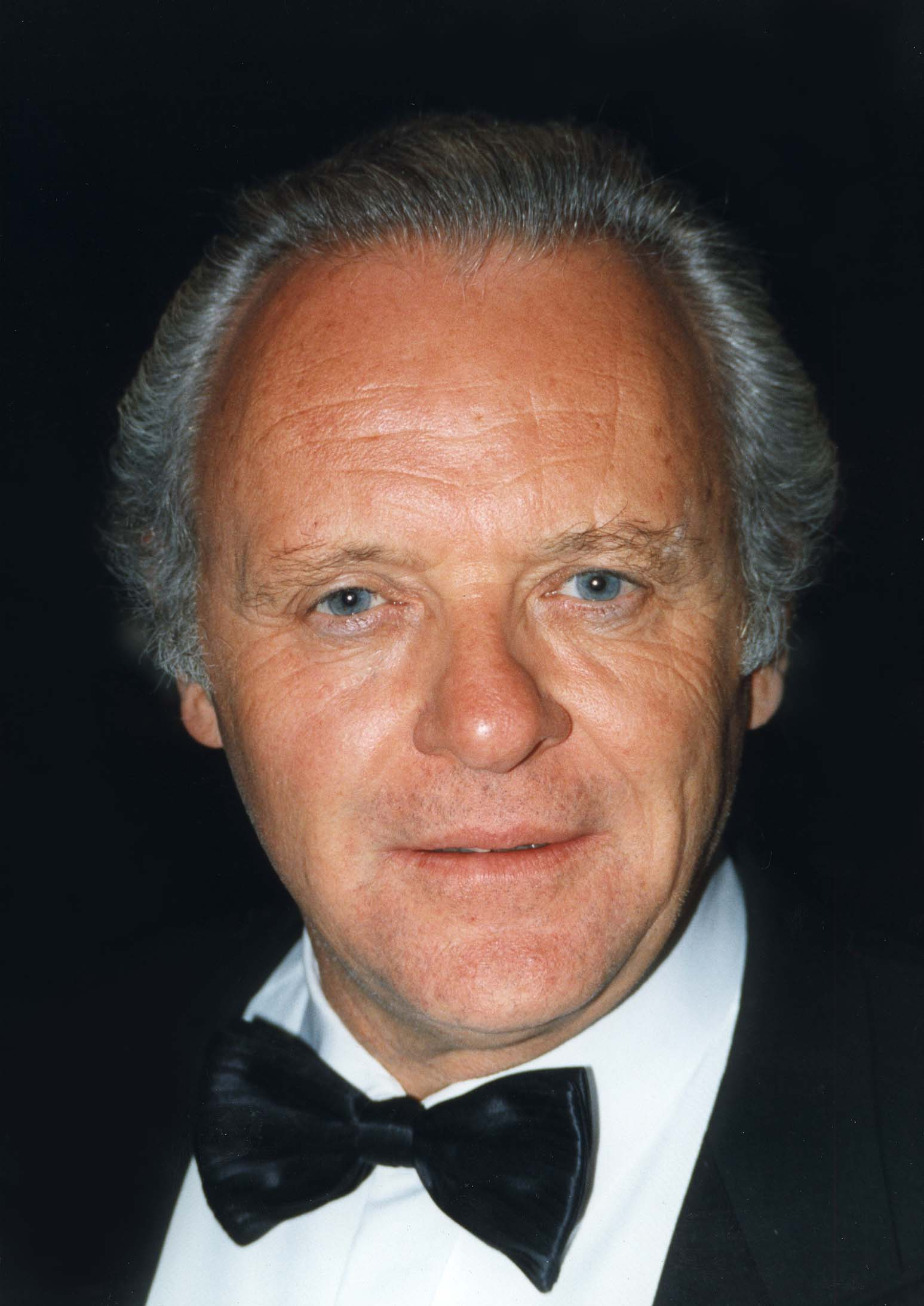
Hopkins in 1996

Welsh actor Anthony Hopkins has been acting since 1960. Between then and the 1970s, he appeared in the films The Lion in Winter (1968), Hamlet (1969), Young Winston (1972), Audrey Rose (1977) and playing Col. Frost in A Bridge Too Far (1977). In the 1980s, he had a starring role in the 1980 film The Elephant Man as Dr. Frederick Treves and in the 1987 film 84 Charing Cross Road.

In 1991, he was cast in the role of Dr. Hannibal Lecter in The Silence of the Lambs, a role he played again in both Hannibal (2001) and the prequel Red Dragon (2002). Other notable roles he had during the 1990s were Bram Stoker's Dracula (1992), Chaplin (1992), The Remains of the Day (1993), Legends of the Fall with Brad Pitt (1994), The Mask of Zorro with Antonio Banderas (1998), and Meet Joe Black again with Pitt (1998).

The 2000s saw him in the films The World's Fastest Indian (2005), Fracture (2007), The Wolfman (2010), and The Rite (2011). In 2011 he co-starred with Chris Hemsworth as the Norse god Odin in the Marvel Studios film Thor (2011), then again for its 2013 sequel and the third film in 2017. Also in 2017, Hopkins played the role of Sir Edmund Burton, the last living member of the Order of the Witwiccans, in Transformers: The Last Knight.

Hopkins has had numerous roles where he plays real life people including Richard Hauptmann in The Lindbergh Kidnapping Case (1976), C. S. "Jack" Lewis in Shadowlands (1993), Dr. John Harvey Kellogg in The Road to Wellville (1994), Richard Nixon in Nixon (1995), Pablo Picasso in Surviving Picasso (1996), John Quincy Adams in Amistad (1997), Alfred Hitchcock in Hitchcock (2012), and Pope Benedict XVI in The Two Popes (2019). For his roles in Nixon and Amistad he was nominated for an Academy Award.

His television work includes appearances in Department S (1969), QB VII (1974), All Creatures Great and Small (1975), Hollywood Wives (1985), and Great Expectations (1991). In 2015, he starred in the BBC television film The Dresser, and from 2016 to 2018, he starred in the HBO television series Westworld.

== Film ==
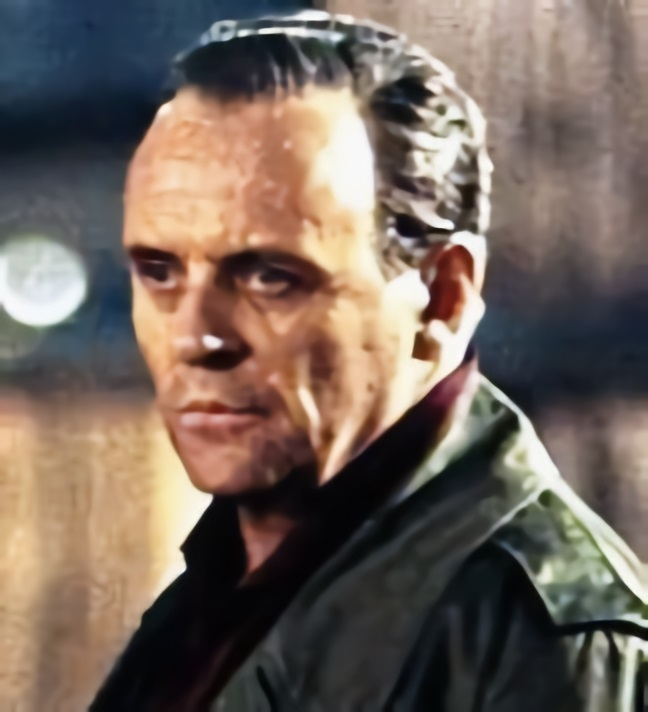
In the film The Innocent (1993)

Year	Title	Role	Notes	Refs.
1967	The White Bus	Brechtian	Short film	
1968	The Lion in Winter	Richard		
1969	Hamlet	Claudius		
1970	The Looking Glass War	Avery		
1971	When Eight Bells Toll	Philip Calvert		
1972	Young Winston	David Lloyd George		
1973	A Doll's House	Torvald Helmer		
1974	The Girl from Petrovka	Kostya		
1974	Juggernaut	Supt. John McCleod		
1977	A Bridge Too Far	Lieutenant Colonel Frost		
1977	Audrey Rose	Elliot Hoover		
1978	Magic	Charles "Corky" Withers / Voice of Fats		
1978	International Velvet	Captain Johnson		
1980	The Elephant Man	Frederick Treves		
1980	A Change of Seasons	Adam Evans		
1984	The Bounty	Lt. William Bligh		
1985	The Good Father	Bill Hooper		
1987	84 Charing Cross Road	Frank Doel		
1988	The Dawning	Maj. Angus "Cassuis" Barry		
1989	A Chorus of Disapproval	Dafydd Ap Llewellyn		
1990	Desperate Hours	Tim Cornell		
1990	Dylan Thomas: Return Journey	Introducer	Also director	
1991	The Silence of the Lambs	Dr. Hannibal Lecter		
1992	Freejack	Ian McCandless		
1992	Spotswood	Errol Wallace		
1992	Howards End	Henry J. Wilcox		
1992	Bram Stoker's Dracula	Professor Abraham Van Helsing		
1992	Chaplin	George Hayden		
1993	The Trial	The Priest		
1993	The Innocent	Bob Glass		
1993	The Remains of the Day	James Stevens		
1993	Shadowlands	C. S. "Jack" Lewis		
1994	The Road to Wellville	Dr. John Harvey Kellogg		
1994	Legends of the Fall	Col. William Ludlow		
1995	Nixon	Richard Nixon		
1996	August	Ieuan Davies	Also director	
1996	Surviving Picasso	Pablo Picasso		
1997	The Edge	Charles Morse		
1997	Amistad	John Quincy Adams		
1998	The Mask of Zorro	Don Diego de la Vega / Zorro		
1998	Meet Joe Black	William Parrish		
1999	Instinct	Dr. Ethan Powell		
1999	Siegfried & Roy: The Magic Box	Narrator (voice)		
1999	Titus	Titus Andronicus		
2000	Mission: Impossible 2	Commander Swanbeck	Uncredited cameo	
2000	How the Grinch Stole Christmas	The Narrator (voice)		
2001	Hannibal	Dr. Hannibal Lecter		
2001	Hearts in Atlantis	Ted Brautigan		
2002	Bad Company	Officer Gaylord Oakes		
2002	Red Dragon	Dr. Hannibal Lecter		
2003	The Human Stain	Coleman Silk		
2004	Alexander	Ptolemy I Soter		
2005	Proof	Robert		
2005	The World's Fastest Indian	Burt Munro		
2006	Bobby	John	Also executive producer	
2006	All the King's Men	Judge Irwin		
2007	Shortcut to Happiness	Daniel Webster		
2007	Slipstream	Felix Bonhoeffer	Also director and writer	
2007	Fracture	Theodore "Ted" Crawford		
2007	Beowulf	Hrothgar	Motion capture	
2008	Where I Stand: The Hank Greenspun Story	Narrator (voice)	Documentary	
2008	Immutable Dream of Snow Lion	—N/a	Short film	
2009	The City of Your Final Destination	Adam Gund		
2010	The Wolfman	Sir John Talbot		
2010	The Third Rule	Fabian Hogarth	Short film	
2010	You Will Meet a Tall Dark Stranger	Alfie Shepridge		
2011	The Rite	Father Lucas		
2011	Thor	Odin		
2011	360	John		
2012	Hitchcock	Alfred Hitchcock		
2013	Red 2	Edward Bailey		
2013	Thor: The Dark World	Odin		
2014	Noah	Methuselah		
2015	Kidnapping Freddy Heineken	Freddy Heineken		
2015	Solace	John Clancy	Also executive producer	
2015	Blackway	Lester	Also producer	
2016	Misconduct	Arthur Denning		
2016	Collide	Hagen Kahl		
2017	Transformers: The Last Knight	Sir Edmund Burton		
2017	Thor: Ragnarok	Odin		
2019	The Two Popes	Pope Benedict XVI		
2019	Where Are You	Thomas Yorke		
2020	The Father	Anthony Evans		
2020	Elyse	Dr. Philip Lewis	Also producer and composer	
2021	The Virtuoso	The Mentor		
2021	Zero Contact	Finley Hart		
2022	Armageddon Time	Aaron Rabinowitz		
2022	The Son	Anthony Miller		
2023	One Life	Nicholas Winton		
2023	Freud's Last Session	Sigmund Freud		
2023	Rebel Moon – Part One: A Child of Fire	Jimmy (voice)		
2024	Rebel Moon – Part Two: The Scargiver	Jimmy (voice)		
2024	Mary	King Herod		
2025	Locked	William		
2026	Maserati: The Brothers †	Luca Antonelli	Post-production	
2027	Wife & Dog †		Post-production	
TBA	Eyes in the Trees †	Dr. Addis	Post-production	
TBA	The Housekeeper †	Lord DeWithers	Filming	

Key
†	Denotes films that have not yet been released

== Television ==
Year	Title	Role(s)	Notes	Refs.
1965	The Man in Room 17	Dr. Harding	Episode: "A Minor Operation"	
1967	A Flea in Her Ear	Etienne Plucheux	Television film	
1969	Department S	Greg Halliday	Episode: "A Small War of Nerves"	
1969	ITV Sunday Night Drama	Arnold	Episode: "A Walk Through the Forest"	
1970	The Great Inimitable Mr. Dickens	Charles Dickens	Television film	
1970	Danton	Georges Danton	Television film	
1970	Play of the Month	Astrov	Episode: "Uncle Vanya"	
1970, 1974	Play for Today	Bob / Alexander Tashkov	2 episodes	
1971	Great Performances	Theo Gunge	Episode: "The Arcata Promise"	
1972–1973	War and Peace	Pierre Bezukhov	17 episodes	
1972	Poet Game	Hugh Sanders	Television film	
1973	The Edwardians	David Lloyd George	Television miniseries; episode "Lloyd George"	
1973	Black and Blue	Hi	Episode: "The Middle-of-the-Road Roadshow for All the Family"	
1974	QB VII	Dr. Adam Kelno	3 episodes	
1974	Possessions	Dando	Television film	
1975	All Creatures Great and Small	Siegfried Farnon	Television film	
1976	Dark Victory	Dr. Michael Grant	Television film	
1976	The Lindbergh Kidnapping Case	Bruno Hauptmann	Television film	
1976	Victory at Entebbe	Prime Minister Yitzhak Rabin	Television film	
1979	Mayflower: The Pilgrims' Adventure	Captain Christopher Jones	Television film	
1981	The Bunker	Adolf Hitler	Television film	
1981	Peter and Paul	Paul of Tarsus	Television film	
1981	Othello	Othello	Television film	
1981	Little Eyolf	Afred Allmers	Television play	
1982	The Hunchback of Notre Dame	Quasimodo	Television film	
1983	A Married Man	John Strickland	4 episodes	
1984	Strangers and Brothers	Roger Quaife	2 episodes	
1984	Arch of Triumph	Dr. Ravic	Television film	
1985	Hollywood Wives	Neil Gray	3 episodes	
1985	Guilty Conscience	Arthur Jamison	Television film	
1985	Mussolini and I	Count Galeazzo Ciano	Television film	
1987, 1993	Screen Two	Guy Burgess / Unnamed role	2 episodes	
1988	Across the Lake	Donald Campbell	Television film	
1988	The Tenth Man	Jean Louis Chavel	Television film	
1989	Heartland	Jack	The Play on One BBC series episode	
1989	Great Expectations	Abel Magwitch	4 episodes	
1991	One Man's War	Joel Filártiga	Television film	
1991	To Be the Best	Jack Figg	Television film	
1993	Selected Exits	Gwyn Thomas	Television film	
2007	American Masters	Narrator (voice)	Episode: "Tony Bennett: The Music Never Ends"	
2015	The Dresser	Sir	Television film	
2016–2018	Westworld	Dr. Robert Ford	17 episodes	
2018	King Lear	Lear	Television film	
2021	Mythic Quest	Narrator (voice)	Episode: "Everlight"	
2024	Those About to Die	Vespasian	7 episodes	

Key
†	Denotes television productions that have not yet been released

== Theatre ==
Year	Title	Role(s)	Venue	Refs.
1964	Julius Caesar	Metellus Cimber	Royal Court Theatre	
1966	A Provincial Life	Boris Ivanov Blagovo	Royal Court Theatre	
1966	A Flea in Her Ear	Etienne Plucheux	The Old Vic	
1966	Juno and the Paycock	Irregular Mobilizer	The Old Vic	
1967	The Three Sisters	Andrei	The Old Vic	
1967	As You Like It	Audrey	The Old Vic	
1971	The Architect and the Emperor of Assyria	The Emperor	The Old Vic	
1971	A Woman Killed with Kindness	Master John Frankford	The Old Vic	
1971	Coriolanus	Coriolanus	The Old Vic	
1972	Macbeth	Macbeth	The Old Vic	
1972	The Taming of the Shrew	Petruchio	Chichester Festival Theatre	
1974	Equus	Dr. Martin Dysart	Plymouth Theatre, Broadway	
1977	Equus	Dr. Martin Dysart	Huntington Hartford Theatre, Los Angeles	
1979	The Tempest	Prospero	Mark Taper Forum, Los Angeles	
1981	The Arcata Promise	Theo Gunge	Cerritos Center for the Performing Arts	
1984	Old Times	Deeley	Roundabout Theatre Company, New York	
1985	The Lonely Road	Julian Fichtner	The Old Vic	
1985	Pravda	Lambert Le Roux	Royal National Theatre	
1986	King Lear	Lear	Royal National Theatre	
1987	Antony and Cleopatra	Antony	Royal National Theatre	
1989	M. Butterfly	Rene Gallimard	Shaftesbury Theatre, West End	
2022	Awakening	Narrator (voice)	Awakening Theater, Wynn Las Vegas	

== Music videos ==
Year	Title	Artist	Refs.
2016	"I Forgive It All"	Mudcrutch	

== See also ==
- List of awards and nominations received by Anthony Hopkins
