= Dante Spinotti =

Italian cinematographer

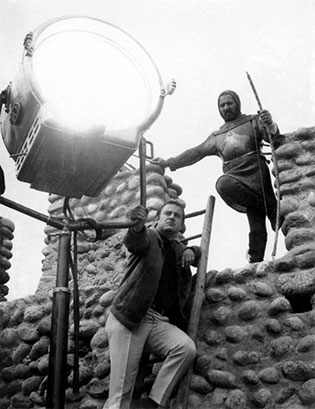
- Spinotti on the set of the Italian TV miniseries The Black Arrow in 1968
- Born: 24 August 1943 (age 83); Tolmezzo, Friuli-Venezia Giulia, Kingdom of Italy
- Years active: 1972–present

Dante Spinotti ASC, AIC (born 24 August 1943) is an Italian cinematographer, known for his collaborations with directors Michael Mann and Brett Ratner.

He received Academy Award nominations for L.A. Confidential (1997) and The Insider (1999), and won a BAFTA Award for The Last of the Mohicans (1992).

== Life and career ==
Dante Spinotti was born in the commune of Tolmezzo, in Northern Italian region of Friuli-Venezia Giulia, near the Austrian border. At the age of 11, he began experimenting with still photography, using a camera inherited from his uncle (a cinematographer and director who specialized in documentaries and newsreels). Spinotti left high school early to work in the film industry in Kenya, driven by his skills in freehand drawing.

Spinotti's first work as cinematographer was the 1972 television drama I Nicotera. His early work included collaborations with noted Italian directors like Lina Wertmüller and Liliana Cavani.

In 1986, Spinotti moved to the United States, forming collaborations with established American directors like Brett Ratner and Michael Mann.

Spinotti has gone on record discussing the preparation and collaborative spirit essential to his work, particularly with director Michael Mann. He also discussed the process of remastering classics like Heat and adapting to new technologies, like digital cameras and even iPhones for certain shots to enhance storytelling.

Dante Spinotti is a member of the board of governors of the Academy of Motion Picture Arts and Sciences. He won the Golden Camera 300 award at the Manaki Brothers Film Festival in North Macedonia for lifetime achievement. In 2012, he received the American Society of Cinematographers's Lifetime Achievement Award.

== Filmography ==
=== Film ===
Key
†	Denotes films that have not yet been released

Year	Title	Director	Notes
1981	Il minestrone	Sergio Citti	
1981	La disubbidienza	Aldo Lado	
1982	Basileus Quartet	Fabio Carpi	
1983	Dream of a Summer Night	Gabriele Salvatores	
1983	Hearts and Armour	Giacomo Battiato	
1984	Cinderella '80	Roberto Malenotti	
1984	Softly, Softly	Lina Wertmüller	
1984	Così parlò Bellavista	Luciano De Crescenzo	
1985	The Dark Side of Love	Salvatore Samperi	
1985	The Berlin Affair	Liliana Cavani	
1986	Choke Canyon	Charles Bail	
1986	Manhunter	Michael Mann	1st collaboration with Mann
1986	Crimes of the Heart	Bruce Beresford	
1987	From the Hip	Bob Clark	
1987	Aria	Bruce Beresford	Segment Die tote Stadt
1988	Illegally Yours	Peter Bogdanovich	
1988	The Legend of the Holy Drinker	Ermanno Olmi	
1988	Fair Game	Mario Orfini	
1988	Beaches	Garry Marshall	
1989	Torrents of Spring	Jerzy Skolimowski	With Witold Sobociński
1990	A Violent Life	Giacomo Battiato	
1990	The Comfort of Strangers	Paul Schrader	
1991	True Colors	Herbert Ross	
1991	Hudson Hawk	Michael Lehmann	
1991	Frankie & Johnny	Garry Marshall	Also made a cameo as "Man on Bus" (Uncredited)
1992	The Last of the Mohicans	Michael Mann	
1992	The End Is Known	Cristina Comencini	
1993	The Secret of the Old Woods	Ermanno Olmi	
1993	Blink	Michael Apted	
1994	Nell	Michael Apted	
1995	The Quick and the Dead	Sam Raimi	
1995	The Star Maker	Giuseppe Tornatore	
1995	Heat	Michael Mann	
1996	The Mirror Has Two Faces	Barbra Streisand	With Andrzej Bartkowiak
1997	L.A. Confidential	Curtis Hanson	
1998	Goodbye Lover	Roland Joffé	
1999	The Other Sister	Garry Marshall	
1999	The Insider	Michael Mann	
2000	Wonder Boys	Curtis Hanson	
2000	The Family Man	Brett Ratner	1st collaboration with Ratner
2001	Bandits	Barry Levinson	
2002	Red Dragon	Brett Ratner	
2002	Pinocchio	Roberto Benigni	
2004	After the Sunset	Brett Ratner	
2006	X-Men: The Last Stand	Brett Ratner	
2006	The Contract	Bruce Beresford	
2007	Slipstream	Anthony Hopkins	
2008	Deception	Marcel Langenegger	Also acted as Herr Kleiner/Mr. Moretti
2008	Flash of Genius	Marc Abraham	
2009	Public Enemies	Michael Mann	
2010	The Chronicles of Narnia: The Voyage of the Dawn Treader	Michael Apted	
2011	Tower Heist	Brett Ratner	
2013	ReWined	Ferdinando Vicentini Orgnani	
2014	Hercules	Brett Ratner	
2015	I Saw the Light	Marc Abraham	
2017	Freak Show	Trudie Styler	
2018	Traffik	Deon Taylor	
2018	Ant-Man and the Wasp	Peyton Reed	
2019	Black and Blue	Deon Taylor	
2019	Where Are You	Valentina De Amicis; Riccardo Spinotti	Also credited as producer
2020	Elyse	Stella Hopkins	
2020	Fatale	Deon Taylor	
2025	The Alto Knights	Barry Levinson	
2026	Up Against It	Trudie Styler	
TBA	That's Amore! †	Nick Vallelonga	Post-production

Documentary film

Year	Title	Director	Notes
2008	Visual Acoustics: The Modernism of Julius Shulman	Eric Bricker	With Aiken Weiss
2023	Posso entrare? An ode to Naples	Trudie Styler	
2026	Melania	Brett Ratner	With Barry Peterson and Jeff Cronenweth

=== Television ===
Miniseries

Year	Title	Director
1972	I Nicotera	Salvatore Nocita
1979	Paura sul mondo	Domenico Campan
1982	Colomba	Giacomo Battiato

TV movies

Year	Title	Director
1975	Tracce sulla neve	Alessandro Cane
1980	La signorina Else	Enzo Muzii
1981	Fosca	Enzo Muzii
1983	Le ambizioni sbagliate	Fabio Carpi
2008	Blue Blood	Brett Ratner
2012	Rogue	Brett Ratner
2015	Edge	Shane Black

TV series

Year	Title	Director	Notes
1982	La pietra di Marco Polo	Aldo Lado	
2005	Prison Break	Brett Ratner	Episode "Pilot"
2007	Women's Murder Club		
2011	CHAOS	Brett Ratner	Episode "Pilot"

== Awards and nominations ==
Year	Award	Category	Title	Result
1997	Academy Awards	Best Cinematography	L.A. Confidential	Nominated
1999	Academy Awards	Best Cinematography	The Insider	Nominated
1992	BAFTA Awards	Best Cinematography	The Last of the Mohicans	Won
1997	BAFTA Awards	Best Cinematography	L.A. Confidential	Nominated
1992	American Society of Cinematographers	Outstanding Achievement in Cinematography	The Last of the Mohicans	Nominated
1997	American Society of Cinematographers	Outstanding Achievement in Cinematography	L.A. Confidential	Nominated
1999	American Society of Cinematographers	Outstanding Achievement in Cinematography	The Insider	Nominated
1997	Los Angeles Film Critics Association	Best Cinematography	L.A. Confidential	Won
1999	Los Angeles Film Critics Association	Best Cinematography	The Insider	Won
1997	Satellite Awards	Best Cinematography	L.A. Confidential	Nominated
2006	Satellite Awards	Best Cinematography	X-Men: The Last Stand	Nominated
2009	Satellite Awards	Best Cinematography	Public Enemies	Nominated
1995	Chicago Film Critics Association	Best Cinematography	Heat	Nominated
1997	National Society of Film Critics	Best Cinematography	L.A. Confidential	Nominated
