= Nicotera (disambiguation) =

Nicotera is a municipality in the province of Vibo Valentia, Calabria, southern Italy.

Nicotera may also refer to:

- I Nicotera, a 1972 Italian drama television miniseries

== People ==
- Giacomo Nicotera, an Italian rugby union player
- Giovanni Nicotera, an Italian patriot and politician
- Mary Lewis Nicotera, a retired American judoka
- Niko Nicotera, a German-born American actor
