= Elyse (film) =

American 2020 drama film

- Directed by: Stella Hopkins
- Written by: Stella Hopkins
- Produced by: Tara Arroyave; Stella Hopkins; Anthony Hopkins; Aaron Tucker
- Starring: Anthony Hopkins; Lisa Pepper
- Cinematography: Dante Spinotti
- Edited by: Bob Joyce
- Music by: Anthony Hopkins
- Distributed by: Gravitas Ventures
- Release date: December 4, 2020
- Running time: 95 minutes
- Country: United States
- Language: English

Elyse is a 2020 American psychological drama film written and directed by Stella Hopkins and starring Anthony Hopkins and Lisa Pepper. It is Stella Hopkins's directorial debut.

The story revolves around Elyse, played by Lisa Pepper, a woman struggling with deep psychological trauma and mental illness. The narrative delves into her deteriorating mental state after a tragic event, exploring themes of grief, memory, and recovery.

== Plot ==
Elyse, a wealthy woman living in Los Angeles, suffers a psychotic break. She becomes estranged from her husband, Steven (Aaron Tucker), and is institutionalized in a psychiatric facility.

While confined, Elyse experiences a blend of memories, hallucinations, and delusions revealing the depth of her emotional trauma. Her psychiatrist, Dr. Lewis (Anthony Hopkins), works to help her confront her past and understand her pain. Through their sessions, Elyse begins to unravel the events leading to her breakdown, grappling with guilt and the loss that has defined her life.

The story navigates her journey of self-discovery and the initial steps toward recovery, portraying her struggles within the confines of her mind and the psychiatric institution.

== Cast ==
- Anthony Hopkins as Dr. Lewis
- Lisa Pepper as Elyse
- Aaron Tucker
- Tara Arroyave
- Fran Tucker
- Anthony Apel
- Julieta Oritiz
- Danny Jacobs

== Release ==
Gravitas Ventures acquired North American distribution rights to the film in October 2020. The film was released in theaters and on VOD on December 4, 2020.

== Reception ==
The film has a 43% rating on Rotten Tomatoes.

Richard Roeper of the Chicago Sun-Times awarded the film one and a half stars out of four.
