= List of awards and nominations received by Anthony Hopkins =

Sir Anthony Hopkins awards and nominations
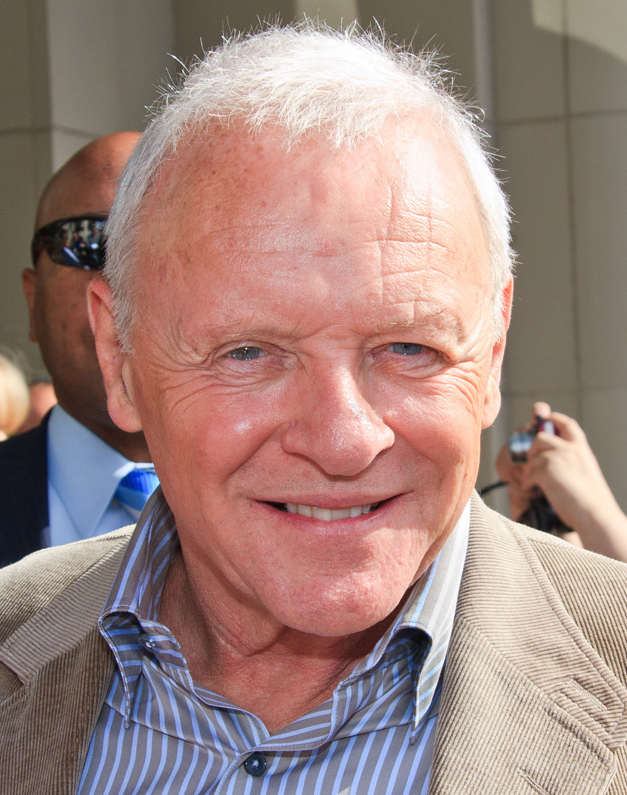
- Hopkins at TIFF in 2010
Awards and nominations
Award	Wins	Nominations
Academy Awards	2	6
Actor Awards	0	7
BAFTA Awards	4	12
Golden Globe Awards	0	8
Primetime Emmy Awards	2	6
Laurence Olivier Award	1	2

Totals (Note: Certain award groups do not simply award one winner. They acknowledge several different recipients, have runners-up, and have third place. Since this is a specific recognition and is different from losing an award, runner-up mentions are considered wins in this award tally. For simplification and to avoid errors, each award in this list has been presumed to have had a prior nomination.)
- Wins: 56
- Nominations: 146

Sir Anthony Hopkins is a Welsh actor known for his extensive and diverse roles on stage and screen. He has received numerous accolades including two Academy Awards, four BAFTA Awards, a Critics' Choice Movie Award, two Primetime Emmy Awards and a Laurence Olivier Award as well as nominations for eight Golden Globe Awards and seven Actor Awards.

Hopkins is an Oscar-winning actor, having received six Academy award nominations winning two of these for Best Actor for his performances as the serial killer Hannibal Lecter in the Jonathan Demme psychological thriller The Silence of the Lambs (1991) and Anthony, a man struggling with dementia in Florian Zeller's drama The Father (2020). He also Oscar-nominated for his performances as a reserved butler in James Ivory's drama The Remains of the Day (1993), Richard Nixon in Oliver Stone's biographical drama Nixon (1995), John Quincy Adams in Steven Spielberg's historical drama Amistad (1997), and Pope Benedict XVI in the Fernando Meirelles religious drama The Two Popes (2019).

For his work on television, he has received six Primetime Emmy Award nominations winning twice for Outstanding Lead Actor in a Limited Series or Movie for his portrayals of Richard Hauptmann in the NBC television movie The Lindbergh Kidnapping Case (1976), and as Adolf Hitler in the CBS television film The Bunker (1981). He was Emmy-nominated for playing Quasimodo in the CBS movie The Hunchback of Notre Dame (1982), Magwitch in the miniseries Great Expectations (1989), and Dr. Robert Ford in the HBO drama series Westworld (2016). He received a nomination for the Actor Award for Outstanding Performance by a Male Actor in a Miniseries or Television Movie for playing the title role in the BBC Two film King Lear (2018).

On stage, he won the Laurence Olivier Award for Outstanding Achievement for his performance in the David Hare play Pravda (1985). Hopkins was made a Commander of the Order of the British Empire in 1987, and a Knight for his serves to drama by Queen Elizabeth II in 1993. Over his career he has received numerous accolades including the Cecil B. DeMille Award in 2006 and the BAFTA Fellowship in 2008.

== Major associations ==
=== Academy Awards ===
2 wins out of 6 nominations

Year	Category	Nominated work	Result	Ref.
1992	Best Actor	The Silence of the Lambs	Won	
1994	Best Actor	The Remains of the Day	Nominated	
1996	Best Actor	Nixon	Nominated	
1998	Best Supporting Actor	Amistad	Nominated	
2020	Best Supporting Actor	The Two Popes	Nominated	
2021	Best Actor	The Father	Won	

=== Actor Awards ===
0 wins out of 7 nominations

Year	Category	Nominated work	Result	Ref.
1996	Outstanding Performance by a Male Actor in a Leading Role	Nixon	Nominated	
1996	Outstanding Performance by a Cast in a Motion Picture	Nixon	Nominated	
1998	Outstanding Performance by a Male Actor in a Supporting Role	Amistad	Nominated	
2007	Outstanding Performance by a Cast in a Motion Picture	Bobby	Nominated	
2017	Outstanding Performance by an Ensemble in a Drama Series	Westworld	Nominated	
2019	Outstanding Performance by a Male Actor in a Miniseries or Television Movie	King Lear	Nominated	
2021	Outstanding Performance by a Male Actor in a Leading Role	The Father	Nominated	

=== BAFTA Awards ===
4 wins (and one honorary award) out of 12 nominations

Year	Category	Nominated work	Result	Ref.
British Academy Film Awards
1969	Best Actor in a Supporting Role	The Lion in Winter	Nominated	
1979	Best Actor in a Leading Role	Magic	Nominated	
1992	Best Actor in a Leading Role	The Silence of the Lambs	Won	
1994	Best Actor in a Leading Role	The Remains of the Day	Won	
1994	Best Actor in a Leading Role	Shadowlands	Nominated	
2008	BAFTA Fellowship		Received	
2020	Best Actor in a Supporting Role	The Two Popes	Nominated	
2021	Best Actor in a Leading Role	The Father	Won	
British Academy Television Awards
1971	Best Actor	The Great Inimitable Mr Dickens / Play of the Month: Uncle Vanya / Play for Today: Hearts and Flowers / Danton	Nominated	
1973	Best Actor	War & Peace	Won	
British Academy Cymru Awards
1994	Best Actor	Selected Exits	Nominated	
2019	Best Actor	King Lear	Nominated	
2020	Best Actor	The Two Popes	Nominated	
BAFTA/LA Britannia Awards
1995	Excellence in Film		Honored	

=== Critics' Choice Awards ===
1 win out of 4 nominations

Year	Category	Nominated work	Result	Ref.
1997	Best Movie Supporting Actor	Amistad	Won	
2006	Best Movie Cast	Bobby	Nominated	
2019	Best Movie Supporting Actor	The Two Popes	Nominated	
2020	Best Movie Actor	The Father	Nominated	

=== Emmy Awards ===
2 wins out of 6 nominations

Year	Category	Nominated work	Result	Ref.
Primetime Emmy Award
1976	Outstanding Lead Actor in a Limited Series or Movie	The Lindbergh Kidnapping Case	Won	
1981	Outstanding Lead Actor in a Limited Series or Movie	The Bunker	Won	
1982	Outstanding Lead Actor in a Limited Series or Movie	The Hunchback of Notre Dame	Nominated	
1990	Outstanding Supporting Actor in a Limited Series or Movie	Great Expectations	Nominated	
2017	Outstanding Lead Actor in a Drama Series	Westworld	Nominated	
2021	Outstanding Narrator	Mythic Quest (episode: "Everlight")	Nominated	

=== Golden Globe Awards ===
0 wins (and one honorary award) out of 8 nominations

Year	Category	Nominated work	Result	Ref.
1979	Best Actor in a Motion Picture – Drama	Magic	Nominated	
1989	Best Actor in a Miniseries or Television Film	The Tenth Man	Nominated	
1992	Best Actor in a Motion Picture – Drama	The Silence of the Lambs	Nominated	
1994	Best Actor in a Motion Picture – Drama	The Remains of the Day	Nominated	
1996	Best Actor in a Motion Picture – Drama	Nixon	Nominated	
1998	Best Supporting Actor – Motion Picture	Amistad	Nominated	
2006	Cecil B. DeMille Award		Honored	
2020	Best Supporting Actor – Motion Picture	The Two Popes	Nominated	
2021	Best Actor in a Motion Picture – Drama	The Father	Nominated	

=== Laurence Olivier Awards ===
1 win out of 2 nominations

Year	Category	Nominated work	Result	Ref.
1985	Award for Outstanding Achievement	Pravda	Won	
1985	Actor of the Year	Pravda	Nominated	

== Critics awards ==
Organizations	Year	Category	Work	Result	Ref.
Boston Society of Film Critics	1991	Best Supporting Actor	The Silence of the Lambs	Won	
Boston Society of Film Critics	2020	Best Actor	The Father	Won	
CableACE Awards	1987	Actor in a Movie or Miniseries	Mussolini and I	Won	
CableACE Awards	1988	Actor in a Theatrical or Dramatic Special	Screen Two	Nominated	
Chicago Film Critics Association	1992	Best Lead Actor	The Silence of the Lambs	Won	
Chicago Film Critics Association	1994	Best Lead Actor	The Remains of the Day	Nominated	
Chicago Film Critics Association	1995	Best Supporting Actor	The Road to Wellville	Nominated	
Chicago Film Critics Association	1996	Best Lead Actor	Nixon	Nominated	
Chicago Film Critics Association	1998	Best Supporting Actor	Amistad	Nominated	
Chicago Film Critics Association	2021	Best Lead Actor	The Father	Nominated	
Dallas-Fort Worth Film Critics Association	1992	Best Lead Actor	The Silence of the Lambs	Won	
Dallas-Fort Worth Film Critics Association	1994	Best Lead Actor	The Remains of the Day	Won	
Drama Desk Awards	1975	Outstanding Actor in a Play	Equus	Won	
Kansas City Film Critics Circle	1991	Best Lead Actor	The Silence of the Lambs	Won	
Kansas City Film Critics Circle	1993	Best Lead Actor	The Remains of the Day	Won	
London Critics Circle Film Awards	1992	Actor of the Year	The Silence of the Lambs	Nominated	
London Critics Circle Film Awards	1994	Actor of the Year	The Remains of the Day	Won	
London Critics Circle Film Awards	2001	British Actor of the Year	Titus	Nominated	
London Critics Circle Film Awards	2020	British Actor of the Year	The Father	Nominated	
London Critics Circle Film Awards	2020	Actor of the Year	The Father	Nominated	
Los Angeles Film Critics Association	1993	Best Actor	Shadowlands / The Remains of the Day	Won	
Los Angeles Film Critics Association	1995	Best Actor	Nixon	Nominated	
National Board of Review Awards	1992	Best Supporting Actor	The Silence of the Lambs	Won	
National Board of Review Awards	1993	Best Lead Actor	Shadowlands / The Remains of the Day	Won	
National Society of Film Critics	1994	Best Lead Actor	Shadowlands / The Remains of the Day	Nominated	
New York Film Critics Circle	1991	Best Lead Actor	The Silence of the Lambs	Won	
New York Film Critics Circle	1993	Best Lead Actor	Shadowlands / The Remains of the Day	Nominated	
New York Film Critics Circle	1995	Best Lead Actor	Nixon	Nominated	
Online Film & Television Association	1997	Acting – Film Hall of Fame		Honored	
Online Film & Television Association	1998	Best Supporting Actor	Amistad	Nominated	
Online Film & Television Association	2017	Best Actor in a Drama Series	Westworld	Nominated	
Online Film & Television Association	2021	Best Narration	Mythic Quest	Won	
Online Film Critics Society	1998	Best Supporting Actor	Amistad	Nominated	
Phoenix Film Critics Society	2012	Best Lead Actor	Hitchcock	Nominated	
Southeastern Film Critics Association	1994	Best Lead Actor	Shadowlands / The Remains of the Day	Won	
Southeastern Film Critics Association	1998	Best Supporting Actor	Amistad	Nominated	
St. Louis Film Critics Association	2012	Special Merit	Hitchcock	Won	
St. Louis Film Critics Association	2020	Best Actor	The Father	Nominated	
Women's Image Network	2005	Best Lead Actor	Proof	Nominated	

== Film festival awards ==
Organizations	Year	Category	Work	Result	Ref.
Capri Hollywood International Film Festival	2020	Best Actor	The Father	Won	
Hollywood Film Festival	2003	Outstanding Achievement in Acting – Male Performer	The Human Stain	Won	
Hollywood Film Festival	2006	Ensemble of the Year	Bobby	Won	
Locarno Film Festival	2007	Golden Leopard award	Slipstream	Nominated	
Locarno Film Festival	2007	Youth Jury award	Slipstream	Won	
Moscow International Film Festival	1987	Best Lead Actor	84 Charing Cross Road	Won	
San Sebastian International Film Festival	1998	Donostia Award		Honored	
Santa Barbara International Film Festival	2000	Maltin Modern Master Award	Titus	Won	
ShoWest Convention Awards	1998	Actor of the Year		Won	
Sitges Film Festival	2007	Best Film	Slipstream	Nominated	
USA Film Festival	2002	Master Screen Artist Tribute award	Hannibal	Won	
Virginia Film Festival	2000	Virginia Film Award		Won	

== International awards ==
Organizations	Year	Category	Work	Result	Ref.
David di Donatello Awards	1993	Best Foreign Actor	Howards End	Nominated	
David di Donatello Awards	1994	Best Foreign Actor	The Remains of the Day	Won	
European Film Awards	2021	Best European Actor	The Father	Won	
Evening Standard British Film Awards	1994	Special award	Anthony Hopkins	Won	
Jupiter Awards	2014	Best International Actor	Hitchcock	Nominated	
New Zealand Screen Awards	2006	Best Performance by an Actor in a Leading Role	The World's Fastest Indian	Won	
Sant Jordi Awards	1992	Best Foreign Actor	The Silence of the Lambs	Won	
Yoga awards	1997	Worst Foreign Actor	Nixon	Won	

== Miscellaneous awards ==
Organizations	Year	Category	Work	Result	Ref.
20/20 awards	2012	Best Lead Actor	The Silence of the Lambs	Won	
20/20 awards	2014	Best Lead Actor	The Remains of the Day	Nominated	
20/20 awards	2018	Best Lead Actor	The Edge	Nominated	
AARP Movies for Grownups Awards	2004	Best Lead Actor	The Human Stain	Nominated	
AARP Movies for Grownups Awards	2006	Best Lead Actor	The World's Fastest Indian	Nominated	
AARP Movies for Grownups Awards	2013	Best Lead Actor	Hitchcock	Nominated	
AARP Movies for Grownups Awards	2013	Best Grownup Love Story (shared with Helen Mirren)	Hitchcock	Won	
Alliance of Women Film Journalists	2007	Most Egregious Age Difference Between the Leading Man and the Love Interest (shared with Robin Wright)	Beowulf	Won	
Alliance of Women Film Journalists	2011	Most Egregious Age Difference Between the Leading Man and the Love Interest (shared with Lucy Punch)	You Will Meet a Tall Dark Stranger	Nominated	
Fangoria Chainsaw awards	1991	Best Lead Actor	The Silence of the Lambs	Won	
Fangoria Chainsaw awards	1992	Best Supporting Actor	Dracula	Won	
Fangoria Chainsaw awards	2002	Best Lead Actor	Hannibal	Won	
Fangoria Chainsaw awards	2003	Best Lead Actor	Red Dragon	Nominated	
Golden Raspberry Awards	1981	Worst Lead Actor	A Change of Season	Nominated	
Golden Raspberry Awards	2018	Worst Supporting Actor	Transformers: The Last Knight / Collide	Nominated	
Hasty Pudding Theatricals Awards	2001	Man of the Year	Anthony Hopkins	Won	
MovieGuide Awards	2012	Most Inspiring Performance in Movies	The Rite	Nominated	
MTV Movie & TV Awards	2001	Best Villain	Hannibal	Nominated	
MTV Movie & TV Awards	2001	Best Kiss (shared with Julianne Moore)	Hannibal	Nominated	
People's Choice Awards	1992	Favorite Dramatic Motion Picture Actor	The Silence of the Lambs	Nominated	
Satellite Awards	2016	Best Lead Actor in a Miniseries or Television Film	The Dresser	Nominated	
Saturn Awards	1992	Best Lead Actor	The Silence of the Lambs	Won	
Saturn Awards	1993	Best Supporting Actor	Dracula	Nominated	
Saturn Awards	1999	Best Lead Actor	Meet Joe Black	Nominated	
Saturn Awards	2002	Best Lead Actor	Hannibal	Nominated	
Saturn Awards	2017	Best Guest Performance in a Television Series	Westworld	Nominated	
Western Heritage awards	1995	Theatrical Motion Picture	Legends of the Fall	Won	

== Honorary awards ==
Organizations	Year	Award	Result	Ref.
Commander of the Order of the British Empire	1987	Medal	Honored	
Knight Bachelor	1993	Inductee	Honored	
Hollywood Walk of Fame	2003	Inductee	Honored	
Golden Globe Cecil B. DeMille Award	2006	Statue	Honored	
BAFTA Fellowship	2008	Statue	Honored	
