= Storia di Anna =

1981 Italian drama television miniseries

- Written by: Gianfranco Calligarich; Sauro Scavolini
- Directed by: Salvatore Nocita
- Starring: Laura Lattuada
- Composer: Tony De Vita
- Country of origin: Italy
- No. of seasons: 1
- No. of episodes: 5

Production
- Cinematography: Nevio Sivini
- Running time: 240 min.

Original release
- Network: Rai 1
- Release: 1981

Storia di Anna (English: Story of Anna) is a 1981 Italian drama television miniseries directed by Salvatore Nocita and starring Laura Lattuada. It is the first Italian series to have drug dependence as main theme. It is based on an early script by Renato Castellani.

== Cast ==
- Laura Lattuada as Anna
- Mario Cordova as Roberto
- Luciano Melani
- Flavio Bucci
- Valentina Fortunato
- Luigi Pistilli
- Tino Schirinzi
- Fiorenza Marchegiani
- Sergio Renda
- Alberto Cancemi
- Valeria Fabrizi
