= Ligabue (film) =

- Directed by: Salvatore Nocita
- Written by: Arnaldo Bagnasco; Cesare Zavattini
- Cinematography: Roberto Gerardi
- Music by: Armando Trovajoli
- Release date: 1978
- Running time: 200 min
- Language: Italian

Ligabue is a 1978 Italian biographical drama film directed by Salvatore Nocita. It depicts real life events of painter Antonio Ligabue. It is based on a book by Cesare Zavattini. For this film Nocita was awarded Nastro d'Argento for Best New Director, while Flavio Bucci won the Nastro d'Argento for Best Actor.

== Cast ==
- Flavio Bucci: Antonio Ligabue
- Andréa Ferréol: Cesarina
- Pamela Villoresi: Pia
- Giuseppe Pambieri: Mazzacurati
- Alessandro Haber: Cachi
- Renzo Palmer: Sindaco
