= I Nicotera =

1972 Italian drama television miniseries

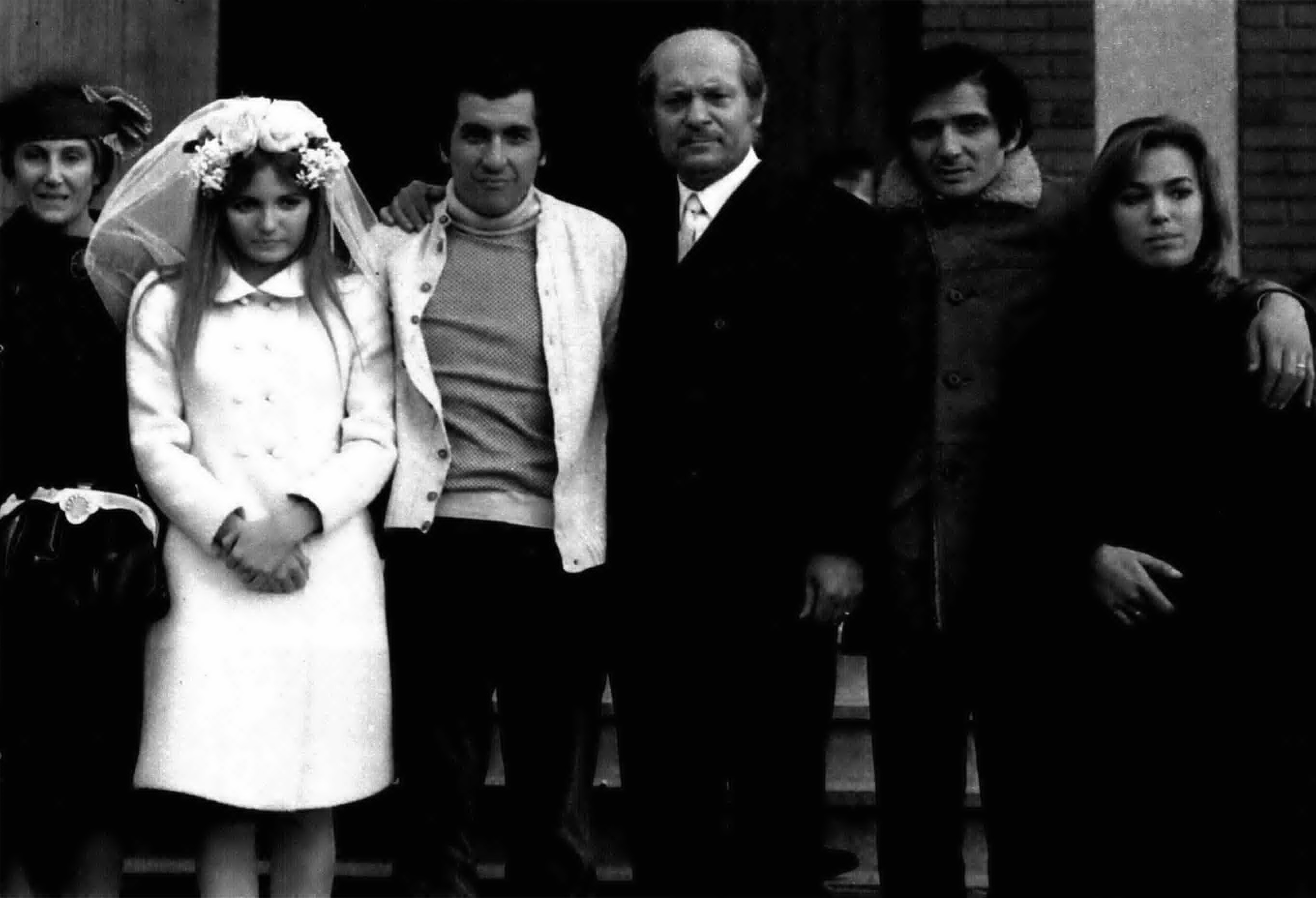
- Written by: Luciano Bianciardi; Arnaldo Bagnasco; Giorgio Cesarano; Salvatore Nocita
- Directed by: Salvatore Nocita
- Starring: Turi Ferro
- Composer: Ennio Morricone
- Country of origin: Italy
- No. of seasons: 1
- No. of episodes: 5

Production
- Cinematography: Dante Spinotti
- Running time: 300 minutes

Original release
- Network: Rai 1
- Release: 1972

I Nicotera is a 1972 Italian drama television miniseries directed by Salvatore Nocita and starring Turi Ferro. A story of ordinary discomfort of a Sicilian family immigrated to North Italy, the miniseries got large critical acclaim.

== Cast ==
- Turi Ferro as Salvatore Nicotera
- Bruno Cirino as Gianni Nicotera
- Gabriele Lavia as Luciano Nicotera
- Micaela Esdra as Anna Nicotera
- Francesca De Seta as Patrizia Nicotera
- Nella Bartoli as Cettina Nicotera
- Nicoletta Rizzi as Marisa Nicotera
- Bruno Cattaneo as Mario
- Daria Nicolodi as Alessandra
- Antonio Casagrande as Osvaldo
- Donatina Furlone as Roberta
- Paolo Modugno as Federico
- Claudio Cassinelli as Psychologist
- Pietro Calderini as Il Piana
- Livia Cerini as Livia
- Ernesto Colli as Giacomo
- Giampiero Albertini as Il Giacovazzo
- Isabella Riva as Mario's Grandma
- Adriana Asti as Marilù
- Gigi Ballista as Pirovano
- Carlo Bagno as Il Pigna
- Claudio Gora as Alessandra's Father
