= Slipstream (2007 film) =

- Theatrical release poster
- Directed by: Anthony Hopkins
- Written by: Anthony Hopkins
- Produced by: Stella Arroyave; Robert Katz
- Starring: Stella Arroyave; Michael Clarke Duncan; Fionnula Flanagan; Gavin Grazer; Anthony Hopkins; Christopher Lawford; Camryn Manheim; Kevin McCarthy; S. Epatha Merkerson; Lisa Pepper; Christian Slater; Jeffrey Tambor; Aaron Tucker; John Turturro
- Cinematography: Dante Spinotti
- Edited by: Michael R. Miller
- Music by: Anthony Hopkins
- Distributed by: Strand Releasing; Destination Films
- Release date: October 26, 2007
- Running time: 96 minutes
- Country: United States
- Language: English
- Box office: $27,769

Slipstream is a 2007 American dark comedy thriller film starring, written, scored, and directed by Anthony Hopkins, which explores the premise of a screenwriter who is caught in a slipstream of time, memories, fantasy and reality. The film co-stars and was produced by Hopkins' wife Stella Arroyave, who also plays his wife. The film premiered at the 2007 Sundance Film Festival. Hopkins composed the music for the film, while British composer Harry Gregson-Williams scored and produced it.

== Cast ==
- Anthony Hopkins as Felix Bonhoeffer
- Stella Arroyave as Gina Bonhoeffer
- Christian Slater as Ray / Matt Dodds / Patrolman #2
- John Turturro as Harvey Brickman
- Camryn Manheim as Barbara
- Jeffrey Tambor as Geek / Jeffrey / Dr. Geekman
- S. Epatha Merkerson as Bonnie
- Fionnula Flanagan as Bette Lustig
- Christopher Lawford as Lars
- Michael Clarke Duncan as Mort / Phil
- Lisa Pepper as Tracy
- Kevin McCarthy as himself
- Jana Grazer as herself
- Gavin Grazer as himself
- Aaron Tucker as Chauffeur / Aaron
- Lana Antonova as Lily
- William Lucking as Detective Buzz Larabee
- Saginaw Grant as Eddie

== Production ==
Actor Anthony Hopkins first wrote the script for Slipstream for fun, saying, "I had no idea where it was going. It just kept evolving on itself. I always wanted to poke fun at the movie business and the acting profession – they take themselves so seriously. I wanted to poke them in the nose." Hopkins explained his perspective of the premise:

I'm fascinated by time. I've written a script about the nature of reality ... It's about reality and the illusion of life because life to me, as I get older, is so illusion-like, so dream-like, that I think it's all a dream. It's about a man, who's caught in a slipstream of time falling back on itself and he remembers his own future. My own interpretation is if there's a God, that God is actually time. I'm fascinated by the fact the older I get every moment just slips past. What is real? You grasp this moment and then it's gone. I was talking 10 minutes ago but that's all gone, it's all a dream. Maybe the puzzle of life is asking what it's all about. I've got a theory that at the moment of impact of death we'll wake up and say, "Ah, that was it all along." My life has been governed a lot by those thoughts and feelings.

Hopkins initially shopped his script to studios for whom he had been bankable. Executives expressed interest as well as input for the script, but Hopkins refused to take the input. Hopkins showed the script to director-producer Steven Spielberg, who praised the dialogue but warned that financing would be difficult. He proceeded to begin production, initiating filming on June 12, 2006 in Los Angeles and moved to the California desert. Gina Arroyave, Hopkins' wife, was one of the producers and acted in the film as Hopkins' on-screen wife. Hopkins rejected studios who wanted to have a final cut of the film, and he instead found a new, unidentified patron to finance the film for under $10 million. During production, filmmakers invited six graduate students from Northern Illinois University to assist with the film for college credit. Hopkins also composed the score for Slipstream and conducted the orchestra for the music. In post-production, Hopkins used quick editing and digital technology to edit a fast-paced cut of Slipstream to speed audiences through the film.

== Release ==
The film later experienced a one-week limited release in 6 theaters in the United States on October 26, 2007, earning $6,273 over the weekend and $8,965 in the full week. The film closed on November 1, 2007, after a week at the box office grossing $8,965 in the North American domestic market and $18,804 in other territories for an international total of $27,769.

== Reception ==
Slipstream premiered at the 2007 Sundance Film Festival on January 20, 2007. The film was met with confusion by Sundance audiences, who wondered about the actual meaning of the premise.

The film was panned by critics. On the film review aggregation website Rotten Tomatoes the film has an approval rating of 27% based on reviews from 41 critics. The website's critics consensus reads, "Slipstream is a failed experiment; confusing instead of coherent." On Metacritic, the film has a score of 47 out of 100 based on reviews from 14 reviews, indicating "mixed or average reviews".

Not all reviews were negative. Roger Ebert gave the film three out of four stars and suggested that the film is worth seeing:

If you'll actively engage your sympathy with Hopkins' attempt to do something tricky and difficult. If you want to lay back and let the movie come to you, you may be lying there a long time.

== See also ==
- Dietrich Bonhoeffer
- August (1996 film directed by Anthony Hopkins)
