= Salvatore Nocita =

Italian director and screenwriter

- Born: 30 July 1934 (age 91); Arcisate, Italy
- Occupations: Director, screenwriter

Salvatore Nocita (born 30 July 1934) is an Italian television and film director, editor and screenwriter.

Born in Arcisate, Varese, in 1958 Nocita became an employee of RAI as an editor, and in 1968 he debuted as director of the journalistic program Faccia a faccia. Shorty later he started directing critical acclaimed television films and TV-series, such as I Nicotera, Gamma, Storia di Anna and The Betrothed. His 1976 television miniseries Ligabue was later released in cinemas in a reduced version and got him a Nastro d'Argento for best new director.
