= The Great Inimitable Mr. Dickens =

The Great Inimitable Mr. Dickens is a 1970 British television film about the life of Charles Dickens directed by Ned Sherrin and starring Anthony Hopkins, Jenny Agutter and Arthur Lowe. Hopkins performance as Dickens saw him nominated for the British Academy Television Award for Best Actor in 1971.
