= Great Expectations (1989 TV series) =

- Based on: Great Expectations by Charles Dickens
- Written by: John Goldsmith
- Directed by: Kevin Connor
- Starring: Jean Simmons; John Rhys-Davies; Ray McAnally; Anthony Calf; Kim Thomson; Adam Blackwood; Anthony Hopkins; Martin Harvey
- Music by: Ken Thorne
- Countries of origin: United Kingdom; United States
- Original language: English
- No. of series: 1
- No. of episodes: 3

Production
- Producer: Greg Smith
- Cinematography: Douglas Milsome
- Editor: Barry Peters
- Running time: 120 mins per episode
- Production companies: HTV; Primetime Television Ltd. Tesauro Television; Walt Disney Television

Original release
- Network: The Disney Channel
- Release: 9 July – 11 July 1989 (USA)
- Network: ITV
- Release: 21 July – 25 August 1991 (UK)

Great Expectations is a British-American television serial based on Charles Dickens' 1861 novel of the same title, with a screenplay by John Goldsmith. Directed by Kevin Connor and produced by Greg Smith, the serial was first broadcast in the US in three parts on The Disney Channel in 1989, and in the UK in six parts on the ITV network in 1991.

== Introduction ==
Jean Simmons, who played the role of the young Estella in the 1946 film, played Miss Havisham in the 1989 version. Other key roles include John Rhys-Davies as Joe Gargery, Ray McAnally as Jaggers, Anthony Calf as the adult Pip, Kim Thomson as both young and adult Estella, Adam Blackwood as Herbert Pocket, Anthony Hopkins as Abel Magwitch, Niven Boyd as Orlick, Susan Franklyn as Biddy and Martin Harvey as young Pip.

Connor and Smith noted that the drama serial format of this production, running five hours, enabled much more of the original story to be filmed than other versions, allowed the restoration of significant characters omitted in other versions, such as Orlick and Wopsle, and additional examination of the roles of other characters, such as Biddy, Drummle, Miss Havisham and the adult Estella.

== List of episodes ==
- Chapter One: 'An Eerie World'
- Chapter Two: 'The Secret Benefactor'
- Chapter Three: 'The Education of a Gentleman'
- Chapter Four: 'A Decaying Life'
- Chapter Five: 'The Hunt for Magwitch'
- Chapter Six: 'Late Regret'

== Cast ==
- Anthony Calf as Pip
- Anthony Hopkins as Abel Magwitch
- Jean Simmons as Miss Havisham
- Kim Thomson as Estella
- John Rhys-Davies as Joe Gargery
- Ray McAnally as Mr Jaggers
- Adam Blackwood as Herbert Pocket
- Martin Harvey as Young Pip
- Susan Franklyn as Biddy
- Charles Lewsen as Mr Wemmick
- Rosemary McHale as Mrs Gargery
- Niven Boyd as Orlick
- Sean Arnold as Compeyson
- Sarah Crowden as Miss Skiffkins
- Arthur Hewlett as The Aged P.
- Frank Middlemass as Uncle Pumblechook
- John Quentin as Mr Wopsle
- Preston Lockwood as Mr Hubble
- Eve Pearce as Mrs Hubble
- Owen Teale as Bentley Drummle
- Simon Warwick as Startop

== Locations ==
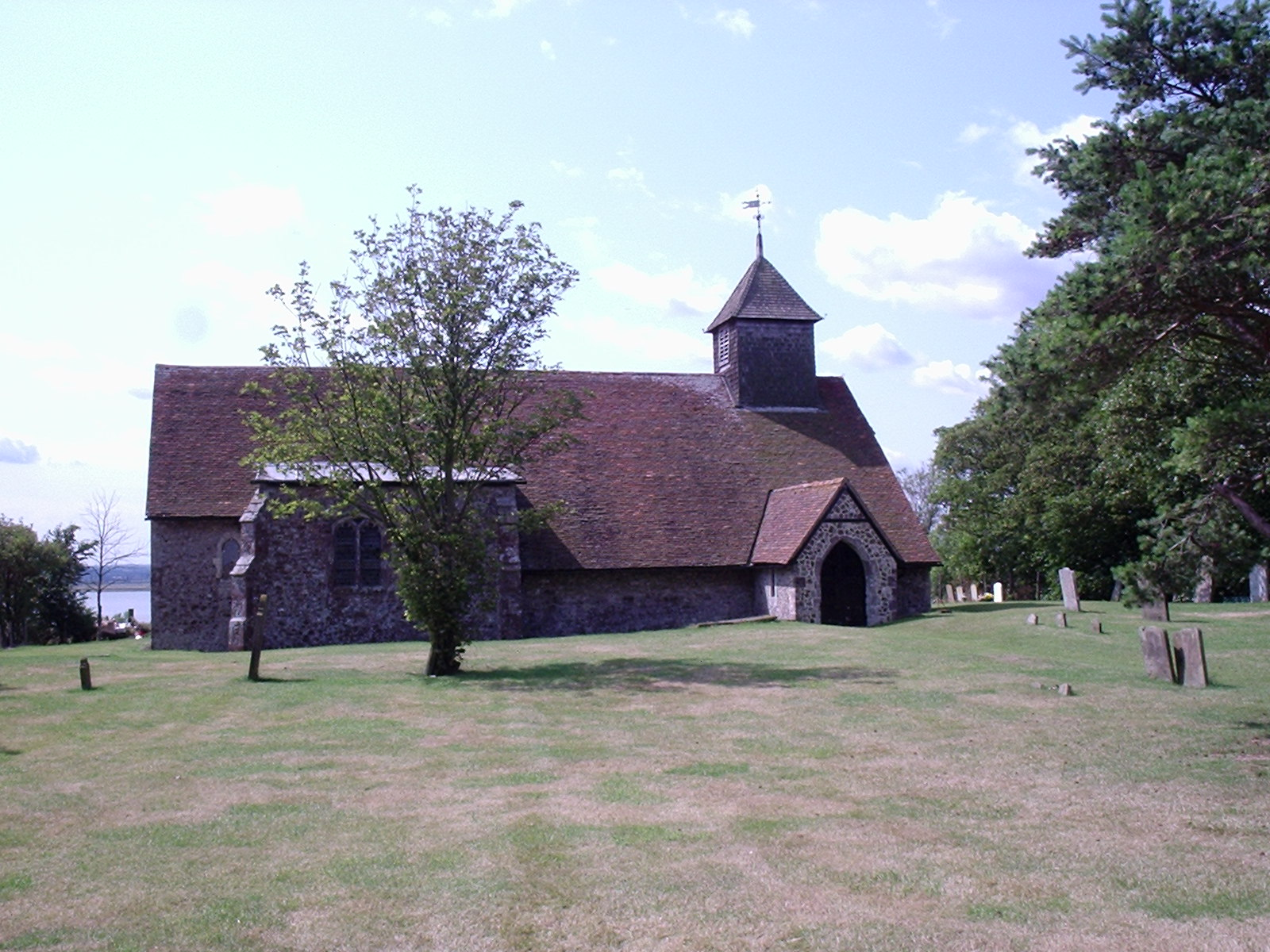
Harty church on the Isle of Sheppey in Kent – scene in the TV series for the moment when the orphan Pip meets the escaped convict, Magwitch.

Harty Church on the Isle of Sheppey in Kent was used for the moment when young orphan Pip, whilst visiting his parents' grave, meets the escaped convict, Abel Magwitch. Upnor Village was used as the home of Herbert Pocket's fiancée Clara's house. Upnor Lighthouse is visible as Pip docks in the village.

== Release ==
The first episode aired on the Disney Channel on July 9, 1989. It was released on video in 1990.
