= Aaron Tucker =

Canadian digital artist (born 1982)

- Born: 1982 (age 43–44); Vernon, British Columbia, Canada
- Education: University of Windsor; University of Victoria; York University
- Writing career
- Notable works: Irresponsible Mediums: The Chess Games of Marcel Duchamp (2017); Virtual Weaponry: The Militarized Internet in Hollywood War Films (2017); Y: Oppenheimer, Horseman of Los Alamos (2018); Catalogue d'oiseaux (2020); Soldiers, Hunters, Not Cowboys (2023)
- Website: aarontucker.ca

Aaron Tucker (born 1982) is a Canadian writer, digital artist, and scholar.

He is a lecturer in the English department and a research fellow with the Centre for Digital Humanities at Toronto Metropolitan University. He received his Ph.D. from the Cinema and Media Arts Department at York University in March 2023, where his graduate work studying the cinema of facial recognition technologies was awarded the Governor General Gold Medal.

== Life and work ==
Tucker was born in Vernon, British Columbia, and resides and works in Toronto, Ontario. He is the author of two novels, three books of poetry, and two academic books. He teaches and researches 3D printing and other artistic ways of rethinking the relationship between humans and computers. He also collaborates with poets, programmers, and artists on digital art projects such as The ChessBard and Loss Sets.

His academic work looks primarily at the intersection of citizenship, the management of citizenship resources, and crises within facial recognition technology, with articles appearing in IEEE Technology and Society and Afterimage.

== Works ==
=== Novels ===
- Y: Oppenheimer, Horseman of Los Alamos. Toronto: Coach House Books, 2018.
- Soldiers, Hunters, Not Cowboys. Toronto: Coach House Books, 2023.

=== Poetry collections ===
- Punchlines. Toronto: Mansfield Press, 2014.
- Irresponsible Mediums: The Chess Games of Marcel Duchamp. Toronto: Bookhug Press, 2017.
- Catalogue d'oiseaux. Toronto: Bookhug Press, 2020.

=== Academic monographs ===
- Interfacing With the Internet in Popular Cinema. New York: Palgrave Macmillan, 2014.
- Virtual Weaponry: The Militarized Internet in Hollywood War Films. New York: Palgrave Macmillan, 2017.
- Write Here, Right Now: An Interactive Introduction to Academic Writing and Research. Toronto: Ryerson University Pressbooks, 2018. With Dr. Paul Chafe.

=== Art projects ===
- The ChessBard with Jody Miller. Toronto: various locations, 2014-.
- Loss Sets with Jordan Scott, Namir Ahmed, and Tiffany Cheung. Toronto, Ryerson University Digital Media Experience Lab, 2015-.

=== Art exhibitions and performances ===
- You/I: Interfaces & Reader Experience. Paul Watkins Gallery, Winona State University, Winona, MN, USA. September 22-October 14, 2016. Curated by Dene Grigar.
- The ChessBard at Philalalia with Jennifer Shahade. Philalalia. Temple University, Philadelphia, PA, USA. September 15, 2016.
- Electronic Literature Festival 2016. University of Victoria, Victoria, B.C., Canada. June 2016. Curated by Brenda Grell.
- Jennifer Shahade & The ChessBard: A Blindfold Exhibition. Ryerson University, Toronto, Ontario, Canada. September 15, 2015.
- The ChessBard Aaron Tucker and Jody Miller. The Ends of Electronic Literature Festival Exhibition. University of Bergen, Bergen, Norway. August 2015.
