= The Vicar of Wakefield (disambiguation) =

The Vicar of Wakefield is a novel by Oliver Goldsmith.

It may also refer to several adaptations of the novel, including:

- The Vicar of Wakefield (1910 film), an American silent short drama
- The Vicar of Wakefield (1913 film), a British silent historical drama film
- The Vicar of Wakefield (1916 film), a British silent drama film
- The Vicar of Wakefield (1917 film), an American silent historical drama film
- The Vicar of Wakefield (TV series), a 1959 Italian television series
