= 1959 in Italian television =

This is a list of Italian television related events from 1959.

== Events ==
- 1 January: For the first time, RAI celebrates the new year broadcasting of the Vienna New Year's Concert, in Eurovision. The event becomes a New Year tradition for the Italian Television until 2004, when it is replaced by the Venice New Year's Concert.
- 4 January: Nilla Pizzi wins the second edition of Canzonissima with "L'edera".
- 29-31 January : Sanremo Music Festival, hosted by Enzo Tortora and Adriana Serra; Domenico Modugno and Johnny Dorelli win, for the second time in a row, with Piove (Ciao ciao bambina).
- 29 January - 26 February. John Cage participates to the quiz Lascia o raddoppia? as a contestant. The American composer wins five million liras, answering to questions about mushrooms. He then performs in studio his pieces of "concrete music".
- 19 March: The PCI presents a proposal for the RAI reform, aimed to transfer the control of the company from the government to the parliament; in February, an analogue proposal had been presented by radicals and PRI.
- 4 April: Adriano Celentano, Mina and Giorgio Gaber debut in television. In an episode of Il musichiere, the three singers, together with other young Italian rockers, make a surprise appearance, in the presence of Luciano Tajoli, exponent of the traditional melodic song. Celentano performs Jailhouse Rock and is called "the Italian Elvis".
- 21 May: The inauguration, by 1962, of a second RAI TV channel, is decided; the year sees also the opening of several new RAI regional offices.
- 9 June: The broadcast of a pseudo-Greek tragedy (The Medea’s sons, by Vladimiro Cajoli), with Alida Valli, is suddenly interrupted because the actress’ son has been abducted by Enrico Maria Salerno. The kidnapper is captured in the bar of the RAI, after the live broadcast of a raving monologue. The whole thing is clearly a joke but, similarly to Orson Welles’ The War of the Worlds twenty years before, many viewers take it seriously. The fake phone number given by the actor playing a police officer receives numerous calls. The episode causes an harsh debate about the new medium's dangers.
- 28 June: At the show Un, due, tre the comedian Ugo Tognazzi simulates a fall from his chair. At the remarks of his partner Raimondo Vianello, he answers: "Everybody can fall", alluding to a similar accident, shot by the cameras, which had recently occurred to Italian President Giovanni Gronchi. The harmless gag, improvised live, arouses the ire of the RAI executives. Renzo Puntoni, producer of "Un, due, tre", is fired, while Tognazzi and Vianello are forced to prerecord their performances. At the end of the season, the show is cancelled, notwithstanding its popularity. For some years, the two actors are turned away from public television and relegated to radio.
- 26 August: The literary critic Leone Piccioni, son of the Minister Attilio, becomes director of the television news. He replaces Massimo Rendina, who was considered too much of a leftist by the Segni government.
- 7 September: During the show Serata di gala (Gala soirée), the popular Italian bandleader Renato Carosone announces his unexpected retirement. He would explain later that he wanted to go out on a high, fearing a change in the public's tastes following the arrival of rock and roll.
- 26 September: Giusi Guercilena, 12 years old, wins the first edition of Zecchino d’oro with Quartetto.
- 3 December: Foundation by Rai Corporation of the Italian Radio TV System, a New York-based subsidiary. Its aim is the production and sale of Italian programs in the United States.

== Debuts ==
=== Mystery serials ===
- Giallo club-invito al poliziesco (Crime club- Invite to the detective story), four seasons - mix of detective serial and quiz. The host (Paolo Ferrari) introduces the enquiries of Lieutenant Ezechiele Sheridan (Ubaldo Lay), of the San Francisco police department; towards the end, the story is interrupted and three competitors have to guess the solution of the mystery. The movies are naive and homemade for the today's standards, but, at the time, get a massive success. The Sheridan character, with his characteristic white trench, will be later reprised in several TV-movie, miniseries and spots.
- United States - Alfred Hitchcock presents
- United States - Perry Mason

=== Variety ===
- Campanile sera (Bell tower at the evening) – 3 seasons, hosted by Mike Bongiorno and Enzo Tortora. Two villages (one from the North and one from the South Italy) challenge each other in quizzes and athletic tests.
- Pesaro festival of light music – 16 seasons.
- Zecchino d’oro – international children's song festival, ideated and, for fifty years, hosted by Cino Tortorella. It’ is again regularly and successfully broadcast every year by Rai Uno.
- Buone vacanze (Good holydays) – musical show care of Gorni Kramer; 2 seasons.

=== News and educational. ===
- Sette giorni al parlamento (Seven days at the Parliament) – by Jader Jacobelli.
- La posta di padre Mariano (Father Mariano's mail) – religious column with Mariano da Torino; the same year, the Capuchin friar hosts two other shows, In famiglia and Chi è Gesù.
- Avventure di capolavori (Adventures of masterpieces) – program of art history, care of Emilio Garroni.

== Television shows ==
=== Drama and comedy ===
- I figli di Medea (The Medea's sons) – by Vladimiro Cajoli, directed by Anton Giulio Majano, with Alida Valli (at her debut on the little screen) and Enrico Maria Salerno, controversial experiment of fake "reality-show" (see Events).
- Processo di famiglia (Trial of the family) – by Diego Fabbri, directed by Vittorio Cottafavi, with Gianni Santuccio, Evi Maltagliati and Nando Gazzolo; a child is contended by natural ad adoptive parents.
- Concerto di prosa - recital by Enrico Maria Salerno and Giancarlo Sbragia.
- Monetine da cinque lire (Five liras nickels)– by Paolo Emilio d’Emilio, with Dario Fo.
- Addio giovinezza (Goodbye youth) – operetta by Alessandro De Stefani, directed by Vito Molinari, with Arturo Testa and Romana Righetti; the futureless love between a student and a seamstress.

The popular success of the plays with Gilberto Govi goes on; between January and February, the National Channel broadcasts four new titles, included the actor's signature play I maneggi per maritare una figlia (The schemes to marry a daughter).

=== Miniseries ===
- I masnadieri (from Schiller’s The robbers) – by Anton Giulio Majano, with Virna Lisi, Aldo Giuffrè, Alberto Lupo.
- L'idiota (from Dostoevsky’s The idiot) – by Giacomo Vaccari, with Giorgio Albertazzi (author of the script), Anna Proclemer and Gian Maria Volonté.
- L'isola del tesoro (from Stevenson’s Treasure Island) – by Anton Giulio Majano, with Ivo Garrani, Arnoldo Foà and the young Alvaro Piccardi. The director is able to serve the charm and the adventurous spirit of the novel, in spite of the poor means (the show is integrally shot in studio); memorable the acting of Garrani as Long John Silver.
- Il romanzo di un maestro (from De Amicis’ The novel of a schoolmaster) – by Mario Landi, with Armando Francioli.
- Ottocento (Nineteenth century, from the Salvator Gotta’s novel and the Costantino Nigra’s memories) – by Anton Giulio Majano, with Sergio Fantoni (Costantino Nigra), Lea Padovani (Eugenie de Montijo) and Virna Lisi (Countess of Castiglione). Realized as a tribute to the centenary of the second War of independence, It gives a fictional version of its antecedents.
- The Vicar of Wakefield (from Goldsmith’s The Vicar of Wakefield) – by Guglielmo Morandi, with Carlo D’Angelo.
- Una svolta pericolosa: una storia d’oggi (A dangerous turn: a today's story) –by Gianni Bongioanni. A newlywed couple is pushed by economic necessities to the crime; it's the first Italian miniseries of contemporary settings and with a social background.
- Le avventure di Pinocchio (The adventures of Pinocchio) – by Enrico D’Alessandro, for kids.

=== Variety ===
- Canzonissima 1959. It was the edition of the shows most appreciated by public and critics, thanks to the talent of authors (Garinei and Giovannini), director (Antonello Falqui) and hosts (Delia Scala, Nino Manfredi and Paolo Panelli). Nino Manfredi gets a huge success playing the barman of Ceccano, a caricature of the naive people from Lazio countryside, and his catchphrase "Fusse che fusse la volta bona" (Maybe it's the right time) becomes proverbial; but the true star is Delia Scala, who proves to be a complete show-girl. The contest is won by Joe Sentieri with Piove (the song had already triumphed at the Sanremo festival), while Mina is known by the general public singing Nessuno.
- Il mattatore (The spotlight chaser) – "mixed show" directed by Daniele D’Anza, script by Federico Zardi. It's virtually a Vittorio Gassman's one-man show (also if, technically, sometimes he shares the scene with other actors). The star of the Italian stage and cinema exhibits the whole extensions of his talent, passing from the classic theatre to the cabaret, often parodying himself and trying also the political satire (a taboo argument, till then, for the Italian television). The show, following its public and critical success, the next year is adapted into a movie.
- Le divine (The divine women) – by Mario Ferrero, with Franca Valeri, Vittorio Caprioli and Monica Vitti, in six episodes; a parody of the history of the show business, from the belle èpoque to the television age, through the history of six imaginaries female stars, played by Franca Valeri.
- Serata di gala – the show, in addition to the presence of many singing star, as Dalida, Fred Buscaglione and Renato Carosone (see over), is remembered for the debut of Topo Gigio, voiced by Domenico Modugno.
- Stasera a Rascel City (Tonight in Rascel City) by Eros Macchi, with Renato Rascel and Tina De Mola. The actor attempts an innovative variety show, set in a community of homeless people rather than in an elegant setting, but the experiment is rejected by critics and audiences alike.
- Il teatrino di Walter Chiari (Walter Chiari's little theatre).

=== News and documentaries ===
- L'India vista da Rossellini (India seen by Rossellini). The famous director shows and comments the filmed material gathered in the processing of the film India.
- La donna che lavora (The working woman) - first example of Italian TV investigative journalism, by Ugo Zatterin. The reporter travels all over Italy to interview women working in every field of the economy (agriculture, industry, tertiary). The enquiry has a great impact on public opinion and is now again a precious source of information about the female condition of the time; in 1993 another edition, with new interviews to the same women, had been realized by Raffaella Spaccarelli.
- Incontri di Indro Montanelli (Indro Montanelli's encounters). The famous journalist meets important figures of the Italian culture, as Moravia, Guttuso, Carlo Levi, Guareschi and De Laurentis; the interviews often become, willingly, almost humorous sketches. It was the first (and long time the only) Montanelli's experience as a television journalist.

== Ending this year ==
- Lascia o raddoppia
- Un, due e tre (see Events)
