= 1993 in Italian television =

This is a list of Italian television related events form 1993.

== Events ==
In 1993, all three the principal Italian television companies (RAI, Finivest and Telemontecarlo) have to face hard financial troubles and the consequences of the Mani Pulite typhoon that upset the political system. Both the talk shows of Michele Santoro and Gad Lerner on RAI 3 and the Fininvest news programs (TG5 and TG4) play an important role in gaining the support of the public opinion on the enquiries. However, Fininvest gives a wide space also to Vittorio Sgarbi, who, in his daily column, defends the politicians investigated and attacks the magistrates with unaudited verbal violence.

=== RAI ===
- 3 February: The TG1 director Bruno Vespa, controversial because notoriously bound to the DC, that himself called "my reference editor", resigns after that the journalists have announced a strike against him. On September 8, also the TG3 director Sandro Curzi resigns, to protest against the spending cuts decided by the new RAI board of directors.
- 19 February. The program Un giorno in pretura (A day at the court) gets 7,760 million viewers showing the first Tangentopoli trial, to the Milan council clerk Walter Armanini. Since 28 October, the same program gets an again broader audience airing the process to the Montedison manager Sergio Cusani, where the Procurator Antonio Di Pietro harasses important politicians as Arnaldo Forlani and Bettino Craxi. Umberto Eco is among the few to criticize the use of the television as a pillory.
- 24 April: San Marino RTV begins experimental broadcasts, that become regular 1 March 1994. The estate is owned fifty-fifty by RAI and San Marino government.
- 25 June Reform of RAI. By now, the presidents of the Chamber of Deputies and of the Senate (Giorgio Napolitano and Giovanni Spadolini) nominate the Administrative Council of the estate, that elects at its turn the general director.
- 13 July. Installation of the new board of directors, the so-called "Professors" (also if really the professors are only two on five); Claudio Demattè is elected president, Gianni Locatelli general director. One of the first choices of the new board is to delete the very popular show Saluti e baci, considered vulgar and too expensive. The "professors" have the commission to the settle the RAI budget and to free the estate from the political conditionings, but in both cases, they get limited results.
- 27-28 July: in Milan, five persons die in via Palestro massacre and, simultaneously, in Rome 2 bombs explode near San Giovani in Laterano and San Giorgio in Velabro; all the attacks are of Mafia origin. A dramatic and very long TG1 extraordinary edition, hosted by Angela Buttiglione, follows live the events of the "night of the bombs", from midnight do dawn.
- 13 September: at 5.45 P.M., RAI broadcasts the signing of the Oslo Accords and the handshake between Peres and Arafat on unified networks; the comment is by Italo Moretti.
- 27 September Birth of Rai Parlamento, the headline caring the institutional communication, directed by Nuccio Fava.
- 3 November. In a dramatic TV message to the nation the president Oscar Luigi Scalfaro rejects with indignation the charge to have received illicit funds by the secret services when he was interior minister.
- 17 November: the match Italy-Portugal for the qualification to the 1994 FIFA World Cup gets the record audience of the year, with 20, 300 million viewers.
- 25 November-2 December For the last time, Beppe Grillo appears in RAI with a two-part show that gets 14,600 million viewers. The performer attacks harshly the TV publicity and moreover the telephonic society STET, accused to host nasty services and erotic hotlines. (The STET president, Biagio Agnes, former RAI general director, had banished Grillo from the little screen for his attacks to the PSI). Later, Grillo will exhibit only in pay-tv.
- 17 December: the RAI correspondent from New York Maria Giovanna Maglie is forced to resigns for irregularities in the expenses list.
- 24 December: for the first time, Rai airs the Christmas Concert from the Paul VI audience Hall in Vatican, with the presence, among others, of Lucio Dalla and Angelo Branduardi; Elisabetta Gardini presents the show. The event will become a tradition of the Christmas time, aired sometimes by RAI, sometimes by Canale 5.
- ·28 December: after forty years of presence in video, Nicoletta Orsomando retires and is knighted.
- ·30 December : the Ciampi cabinet emanates the so-called "save RAI decree" establishing a capital increase of 500 billion liras and a growth of the canon to avoid the failure of the estate. Silvio Berlusconi accuses Ciampi to waste the taxpayers' money for a RAI controlled by PDS.

=== Fininvest ===
For Fininvest, 1993 is a difficult year, with the closure of La Cinq, a growing indebtment with the banks, the arrest for corruption of the manager Aldo Brancher and the perspective of a hostile government if the left wins the next elections. The idea of a direct intervention of Silvio Berlusconi in politics, to save the company interests, begins to circulate. However, Canale 5 confirm its public success, and Enrico Mentana's TG5 is the most viewed news program, overcoming TG1.

- 15 March: Mediavideo, the Fininvest teletext, is born.
- 7 April : at the Maurizio Costanzo Show, the principal TV stars, both RAI and Fininvest, with the slogan "Forbidding is forbidden", take the field and mobilize the public against the projected regulation that forbids the infomercials inside the TV shows. The initiative is successful and the project is retired. The episode inaugurates the unprejudiced use by Silvio Berlusconi of the television for political purposes.
- 14 May: in Rome, Maurizio Costanzo and his wife Maria De Filippi, leaving the Parioli Theatre after the recording of Maurizio Costanzo Show, escape from a car bomb explosion, thanks to a few seconds delay in the detonation. The bombing, that causes heavy damages and 24 injured, is a reprisal of Cosa Nostra for Costanzo's strong engagement against the organized crime.
- 26 November: in a press conference, broadcast on all the news programs, with a 5 million viewers' audience, Silvio Berlusconi declares himself available to enter politics.
- Maria De Filippi, the future "queen of trash", debuts on Canale 5, replacing Lella Costa as presenter of the show Amici.

=== Other channels ===
- Spring: Montedison completes the acquisition of Telemontecarlo by Rede Globo.
- Summer: the pay-tv Tele+2 gets the rights of the Italian football league system, till then always granted to RAI, and hires the most famous TV sport journalist, Aldo Biscardi; on 29 August, the first encrypted match (Lazio-Foggia) is aired. The passage to the pay-tv revolutionizes the Italian football, with the multiplication of early and late kickoffs.
- September: Cinquestelle, Odeon and Tivuitalia unificates in a single circuit, RTA (Reti Televisive Associate).

== Awards ==
10. Telegatto award, for the season 1992-1993.

- Show of the year: Saluti e baci and (as revelation of the year) Karaoke.
- Man and woman of the year: Alberto Castagna and Lorella Cuccarini.
- Best TV movie: In fuga per la vita.
- Best serial: Un commissario a Roma (for Italy), Beverly Hills 90210 (for abroad) and Perry Mason (as cult serial).
- Best telenovela Cosecharás tu siembra.
- Best spot: Jeans Levi's.
- Best quiz: La ruota della fortuna.
- Best variety: Buona domenica.
- Best talk show: Maurizio Costanzo Show.
- Best magazine: Tocca a noi.
- Best sport magazine: Mai dire Gol.
- Best show for children: Big!
- Special awards: Linea verde and Forum (for the service TV), Mrs. Carmen Spiezia (reader of Sorrisi e Canzoni), Dustin Hoffman and Michael Douglas (for the cinema in TV).

== Debuts ==
=== RAI ===
==== Serial ====
- Amico mio (My friend) – medical drama, set in a pediatric hospital, with Massimo Dapporto and Katharina Bohm; 2 seasons (the second on Canale 5).
- Le storie di Farland (Farland stories) – fantasy series by Giuliana Gamba, with Rodolfo Baldini, inserted in the show for children Solletico.

==== Variety ====
- Il grande gioco dell'oca (The great game of the goose) – presented by Gigi Sabani, directed by Jocelyn; the show is suspended at the second season for production troubles and for the charges of cruelty to animals. The format is successfully exported in the Spanish countries with the title El gran juego de la hoca.
- Mezzogiorno in famiglia (Family noon) – variety and game show, ideated by Michele Guardì, aired by RAI 2 in the weekend around noon; lasted till 2019

==== Sport ====
- Quelli che... il calcio (The ones who the football); presented, in turn, by Fabio Fazio, Simona Ventura, Victoria Cabello, Nicola Savino, Luca e Paolo. The show mixes the results of the Serie A matches with moments of entertainment, trusted to the fans in studio, sometime VIP, sometime ordinary but eccentric people.

==== News and educational ====
- Ultimo minuto (Last minute) – presented by Simonetta Martone; 5 season. The show tells the dramatic experiences of people who risked their lives and includes docu-fiction realized by the future film director Gabriele Muccino; it is famous also for the parody done by Aldo, Giovanni e Giacomo in Mai dire gol.
- Il rosso e il nero (Red and black), political talk show with Michele Santoro; 2 seasons.

=== Fininvest ===
==== Serial ====
- Nonno Felice (Grandpa Felice) – situation comedy by Giancarlo Nicotra, with Gino Bramieri; 3 seasons.
- (United States) Baywatch

==== Variety ====
- Canzoni spericolate (Reckless songs)- music contest among sport and entertainment personalities, the professional singers excluded; presented by Enrica Bonaccorti and Marco Columbro; 2 seasons.
- Festival italiano (Italian festival) – unlucky attempt to create a Fininvest version of the Sanremo festival; hosted by Mike Bongiorno; 2 seasons.
- Moda mare a... (Sea fashion in...); show realized in partnership with the National Chamber of Italian Fashion; 11 seasons..
- Perdonami –show, with Davide Mengacci, from a Dutch format; ordinary people ask for the help of television to reconcile with friends or relatives; 3 seasons.
- Sì o no (Yes or not) – game show ideated by Corrado Mantoni and hosted by Claudio Lippi; 3 seasons.

==== News and educational ====
- Target – magazine by Gregorio Paolini about television, presented in turn by Gaia De Laurentis, Natasha Stefanenko and Tamara Donà; 7 seasons. It is characterized by a sloping rhythm and by stylistic experiments (as the use of a horse as "host") unusual in the Fininvest shows.

=== Other channels ===
- Tappeto volante – (Telemontecarlo) talk show, hosted by Luciano Rispoli and characterized, unlike the Costanzo's programs, by a friendly and relaxed atmosphere; it lasts until 2009, transmigrating to various channel.
- Il processo di Biscardi – (Tele+2) sport show, created by Aldo Biscardi as an answer to Rai's Il processo del lunedì; after having transmigrated, in the years, to Telemontecarlo and various minor channels, it's actually aired by Italia 7.
- Vizi privati, pubbliche visioni (Private vices, public visions) – (Lombardia 7); erotic show where the transsexual Maurizia Paradiso presents amateurish porn videos; 2 seasons.
- USA - Rugrats (Junior TV)

== Shows of the year ==
=== Rai ===
==== TV-movies ====
- Capitan Cosmo – by Carlo Carlei, medium-length sci-fi movie, with Walter Chiari in his last role; first Italian film shot in high definition.
- Il caso Dozier (The Dozier affair) – by Carlo Lizzani, with Lloyd Buchner (James Lee Dozier), F. Murray Abraham and Ennio Fantastichini.
- Dov'eri quella notte? (Where were you that night?) – by Salvatore Samperi, with Kim Rossi Stuart, in 2 episodes; drama about the international adoptions, set in Peru.
- L'uomo dal fiore in bocca (The man with a flower in his mouth) by Marco Bellocchio, with Michele Placido, from Luigi Pirandello's one-act play.
- Una storia italiana (An Italian story) – by Stefano Reali, with Giuliano Gemma, Raoul Bova and Sabrina Ferilli; in two episodes. Sport drama inspired by the life of the Abbagnale brothers.
- Un uomo di rispetto (A man of respect) by Damiano Damiani, with Michele Placido; in 2 episodes. A little Mafioso turns into a detective to avenge his boss.
- Requiem per voce e pianoforte – by Tommaso Sherman, from James Hadley Chase’s What's better than money, with Simona Cavallari and Massimo Popolizio.
- Kamillo Kromo – short animated film by Enzo D'Alò, from the Altan's book about the adventures of a little chameleon.

===== Period drama =====
- Gioco perverso (Perverted game) – by Italo Moscati, with Fabio Testi (Osvaldo Valenti) and Ida Di Benedetto (Luisa Ferida).
- Abraham – by Joseph Sargent, with Richard Harris and Barbara Hershey; starting episode of the series Le storie della Bibbia, produced by Ettore Bernabei's Lux Vide.
- Princesse Alexandra – by Denis Amar, with Anne Roussel and Andrea Occhipinti, in two episodes; co-production with France and Germany; romantic drama set in the Franco-Prussian war.
- Ci sarà un giorno - Il giovane Pertini (A day will come – Pertini as a young man) by Franco Rossi, with Maurizio Crozza in the title role. The movie, that shows a juvenile affair of Sandro Pertini with a married woman, is disliked by the President's widow Carla Voltolina and, for this, it is aired only in 2003.

==== Miniseries ====
- Private crimes – by Sergio Martino, with Edwige Fenech and Ray Lovelock; in 4 episodes.
- L'ispettore anticrimine (The anti-crime inspector) – by Paolo Fondato, with Maurizio Donadoni; 6 episodes. A police inspector fights against Sacra Corona Unita.
- La ragnatela 2 (The web 2) – by Alessandro Cane, with Andrea Occhipinti; in 3 episodes.
- La scalata (The ascent) by Vittorio Sindoni, with Klausjürgen Wussow, Giulio Scarpati and Barbara De Rossi; murky intrigues around a chair of cardiac surgery; 6 episodes

==== Serials ====
- Un commissario a Roma (A police chief in Rome) – by Luca Manfredi, with Nino Manfredi; 1 season.
- Don Fumino – by Nanni Fabbri and Romolo Siena; situation comedy with Renzo Montagnani as a country parish priest; 1 season.
- Tre passi nel delitto (Three steps into the crime) – by Fabrizio Laurenti, with Gioele Dix as the anti-heroic attorney Luca Marotta.
- Orson and Olivia – animated series.

==== Variety ====
- Uno per tutti (One for all) – show for children, with Carlo Conti and Maria Teresa Ruta.
- Cielito lindo – variety of social satire, written by Michele Serra and Sergio Staino, with Athina Cenci and Claudio Bisio.
- Maddecheaò! Come secernere agli esami (Hot to secrete in graduation) – satirical variety with Corrado Guzzanti playing Lorenzo Scarz, a foul-mouthed high school student.
- Vamos a bailar – music show about Latin dance, with Leonardo Pieraccioni.
- Ieri, oggi… e domani – spin-off of Ieri e oggi, with Enrico Vaime and Simona Marchini.
- Troppolitani – happening of the performer Antonio Rezza, who makes provocative interviews to the passers-by in Rome.

==== News and educational ====
- Tocca a noi (It is our turn) - magazine by Enzo Biagi.
- Il pianeta dei dinosauri (The dinosaurs' planet) – program of popular science, by Piero Angela.
- Totò, un altro pianeta (Totò, another planet) – documentary in 15 episodes by Giancarlo Governi, analyzing the life and the career of the Neapolitan comic actor in every respect.
- La donna che lavora (The working woman) – by Raffaella Spaccarelli; presented by Tina Anselmi; updating of the historical 1959 reportage.
- Istria 1943-93, cinquant’anni di solitudine (Fifty years of solitude) – documentary by Anna Maria Mori about the Istrian-Dalmatian exodus.

=== Fininvest ===
==== TV-movies ====
- Due vite un destino (Two life a destiny) – by Romolo Guerrieri, with Michael Nouri, Fabio Testi and Rod Steiger, from the Alan Altieri's novel; in two parts. The Sicilian Mafia manages a Vietnam veteran to use it as hitman.
- Fantaghirò 3 - by Lamberto Bava, with Alessandra Martines, Ursula Andress and Kim Rossi Stuart; in two parts; in the series, it is the episode with the most horrific tones.
- Heidi – by Michael Ray Rhodes, con Jason Robards, from Johanna Spyrl's novel, coproduction with Disney Channel; in two parts.

==== Miniseries ====
- In fuga per la vita (Runaway for the life) – by Gianfranco Albano, with Gianni Morandi; 3 episodi. An Italian singer in Germany, faultlessly involved in a drug traffic, must protect himself and the son by the criminals who have already killed his wife.
- Vendetta II: The New Mafia by Ralph. L. Thomas, with Carol Alt; sequel of Vendetta: secrets of a mafia bride; in three episodes.
- Missione d'amore (Love mission) – by Dino Risi, with Carol Alt; in three episodes; story (with strong soap-opera elements) of a combative nun fighting for the Brazilian natives.
- Papà prende moglie (Daddy takes a wife) – by Nini Salerno, with Marco Columbro, Nancy Brilli and Franca Valeri, in eight episodes; it inaugurates the strand of the Italian fictions about the enlarged families.

==== Serial ====
- Quelli della speciale (The task force's ones) by Bruno Corbucci; sequel of Classe di ferro, whose characters are now cops in Rome. The serial is interrupted in the middle of the first season, for the low audience.
- Micaela – telenovela with Jeanette Rodriguez, coproduced with Argentina.

==== Variety ====
- A tutto Disney (At full Dinsey) – cartoon show, with Irene Ferri; it introduces in Italy Bonkers, Goff Troop and The little mermaid.
- Belli freschi (Nice cool) – show of the summer with Paolo Bonolis, Laura Freddi and Christian De Sica.
- Campionissimo – italian version of Everybody's equal, with Gerry Scotti.
- Rock'n'roll – by Gianni Boncompagni, spin-off of Non è la Rai, with Orietta Berti.
- Sarà vero (Will it be true) – quiz with Alberto Castagna, debuting in Fininvest; the contenders have to guess if the unbelievable stories told in studio by the guests are true or false.
- Seratissima – tribute show with Enrica Bonaccorti; suspended after two evenings for low ratings.

=== Other channels ===
==== Variety ====
- Corpo a corpo (Clinch) - (Telemontecarlo) talk show about the personal fears, with Alba Parietti.

==== News and educational ====
- Rock notes, La storia del rock (History of rock) – (Telemontecarlo) documentary in 12 episodes by Dario Salvatori.

==== Sit-com ====
- Il polpo (The octopus, parody of La piovra), and Teledurazzo (set in an imaginary television aimed to the Albanian immigrants) – (Telenorba) uncouth sit-coms of Apulian setting, by Gennnaro Nunziante and played by Emilio Solfrizzi in multiple roles.

== Ending this year ==
- A pranzo con Wilma
- Avanzi
- Bellezze al bagno
- Big!
- Buon pomeriggio
- Extralarge
- Il mercato del sabato
- Mezzanotte e dintorni
- Porca miseria
- Il pranzo è servito (a young Matteo Salvini takes part, as contender, to one of the last episodes, defining himself "a professional do-nothing").

== Deaths ==
- 15 September: Edmondo Bernacca, 69, colonel of the Italian Air Force, for decades official weatherman of RAI.
- 4 November: Nerina Montagnani, 96, actress, famous to have played Natalina, the chambermaid of Nino Manfredi in a long series of Lavazza's commercials.
- 20 November: Massimo Inardi, 66, doctor and parapsychologist, very popular champion of TV quiz in the Seventies.
