= De l'amour =

De l'amour may refer to:

- All About Loving (French: De l'amour), a 1964 French comedy film
- De l'amour (Stendhal), an 1822 philosophical treatise by Stendhal
