= The Life of Henry Brulard =

Unfinished autobiography by Stendhal

Vie de Henri Brulard
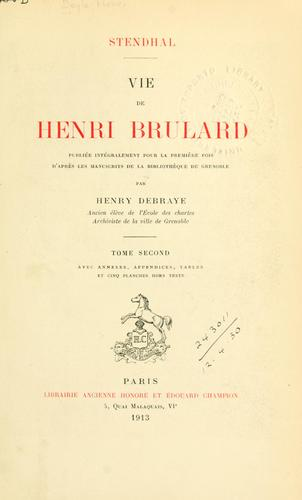
- Stendhal: Vie de Henry Brulard, Edited by Henry Debraye, 1913
- Author: Stendhal (Henri Beyle)
- Original title: Vie de Henri Brulard
- Language: French
- Genre: Autobiography
- Published: 1890
- Publication place: France

The Life of Henry Brulard (French: Vie de Henri Brulard) is an unfinished autobiography by Stendhal. It was begun on November 23, 1835, and abandoned March 26, 1836, while the author was serving as the French Consul in Civitavecchia. Stendhal had severe doubts about contemporary interest in his autobiography, so he bequeathed it to the reader of 1880, or of 1935, or 2000. The manuscript, including Stendhal's numerous diagrams and illustrations, was published in 1890. Stendhal primarily discusses his unhappy and dull childhood, touching briefly on his time as a soldier. The Life of Henry Brulard is considered a masterpiece of autobiographical writing and ironic self-reflection.

== Summary ==
The Life of Henry Brulard begins in 1832, with Stendhal on the Janiculum (named for Janus, the two-faced god of beginnings) looking down at Rome. He begins questioning his accomplishments as he approaches 50 years of age. He reflects on the churches and monuments of the city and how much they have changed since he was a young man. He heads home through a cold mist at night and decides he will reflect upon his past until its truth emerges. He also decides to write as fast as he can without revising, to avoid lies. He believes a quickly-written rough draft would, like automatic writing, disclose the truth about himself. Stendhal explicitly compares himself with Rousseau and calls The Life of Henry Brulard his own Confessions. In reality, Stendhal was 52 years old when he began the memoir and the first scene is a small fiction. The first chapter was written in two days in November 1835, and Stendhal also claims that The Life of Henry Brulard is an imitation of Oliver Goldsmith's novel The Vicar of Wakefield.

Stendhal notes at the start that other men's biographies naturally focus on their public career. Stendhal himself campaigned with Napoleon in Russia and became consul at Civitavecchia. But Stendhal asserts that his real life can be found in a list of the names of women he loved: Virginie, Angela, Adele, Melanie, Mina, Alexandrine, Angelina, Metilde, Clementine, Giulia, Madame Azur, Amalia. Stendhal says that none of these women ever honored him with her favors and, despite others who did, the "habitual condition of my life is that of an unhappy lover."

Stendhal forthrightly admits to wanting to sleep with his mother, who died when he was seven. While discussing his childhood in Grenoble, Stendhal describes how Eighteenth-century French society habitually crushed his natural feelings. He often compares his father to a tyrant or king, on slender pretenses: young Henry is not allowed to play with other kids, not allowed to leave home at age 10, and must accompany his father on walks. Stendhal's descriptions of scenes from his youth often provoke present-moment commentaries, blurring together the feelings of a young boy and the reflections of a middle-aged man.

Stendhal only found happiness when he crossed the Alps into Italy as a 17-year-old in Napoleon's army. Stendhal describes the first time in his life that he mounted a horse, which went berserk and ran towards the willows on the shore of Lake Geneva. For a quarter of an hour he was in fear of breaking his neck. This became a favorite motif of Stendhal's; the heroes of The Red and the Black, Lucien Leuwen, and The Charterhouse of Parma all fall off their horses. Stendhal loved Italy, which he considered a land where his truest self could be freely expressive without fear of reprisals. The Life of Henry Brulard ends with the beginning Stendhal's love for Italy and his mistress Angela Pietragrua, countess Simonetta. Stendhal asks, "How can I talk reasonably about those times? I prefer to put it off until another day...What does one do? How does one describe one's wildest happiness?" Stendhal ends the work by saying, "One spoils such tender feelings by recounting them in detail."
