= Metilde Viscontini Dembowski =

Italian patriot and muse of Stendhal (1790–1825)

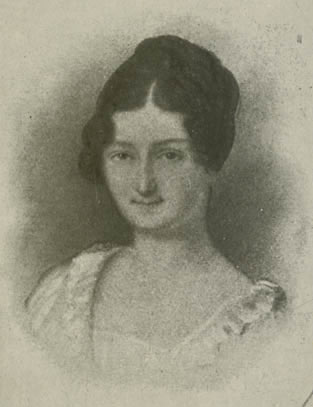
- Alleged portrait of Metilde Viscontini Dembowski (19th century)
- Born: 1 February 1790; Milan, Duchy of Milan
- Died: 1 May 1825 (aged 35); Milan, Austrian Empire
- Known for: Italian patriotism, inspiration for Stendhal's De l'amour
- Spouse: Jan Dembowski
- Children: Carlo Dembowski, Ercole Dembowski

Metilde Viscontini Dembowski (also cited as Matilde; 1 February 1790 – 1 May 1825) was an Italian aristocrat, patriot, and a prominent figure in the Milanese Carbonari movement. She is also known as the unrequited love and muse of the French writer Stendhal, who immortalized her in his treatise De l'amour.

== Early life ==
Metilde was born in Milan to Charles Viscontini and Louise Viscontini Marliani, members of the Milanese nobility. In 1807, she married Jan Dembowski, a Polish officer in Napoleon's army who later became a general and baron. The marriage produced two sons: Carlo (born 1808) and Ercole (born 1812), the latter of whom became a renowned astronomer.

The marriage was troubled due to Jan Dembowski's reportedly violent and irascible character. In 1814, Metilde separated from her husband, fleeing to Bern with her younger son, Ercole.

== Patriotism and political activity ==
Viscontini Dembowski was actively involved in the Carbonari, a secret society of Italian patriots fighting for independence from Austrian rule. In December 1821, during a wave of anti-Austrian uprisings, she was arrested and interrogated by imperial police, suspected of connections with revolutionary figures such as Giuseppe Vismara. She was released after refusing to betray her associates.

== Relationship with Stendhal ==
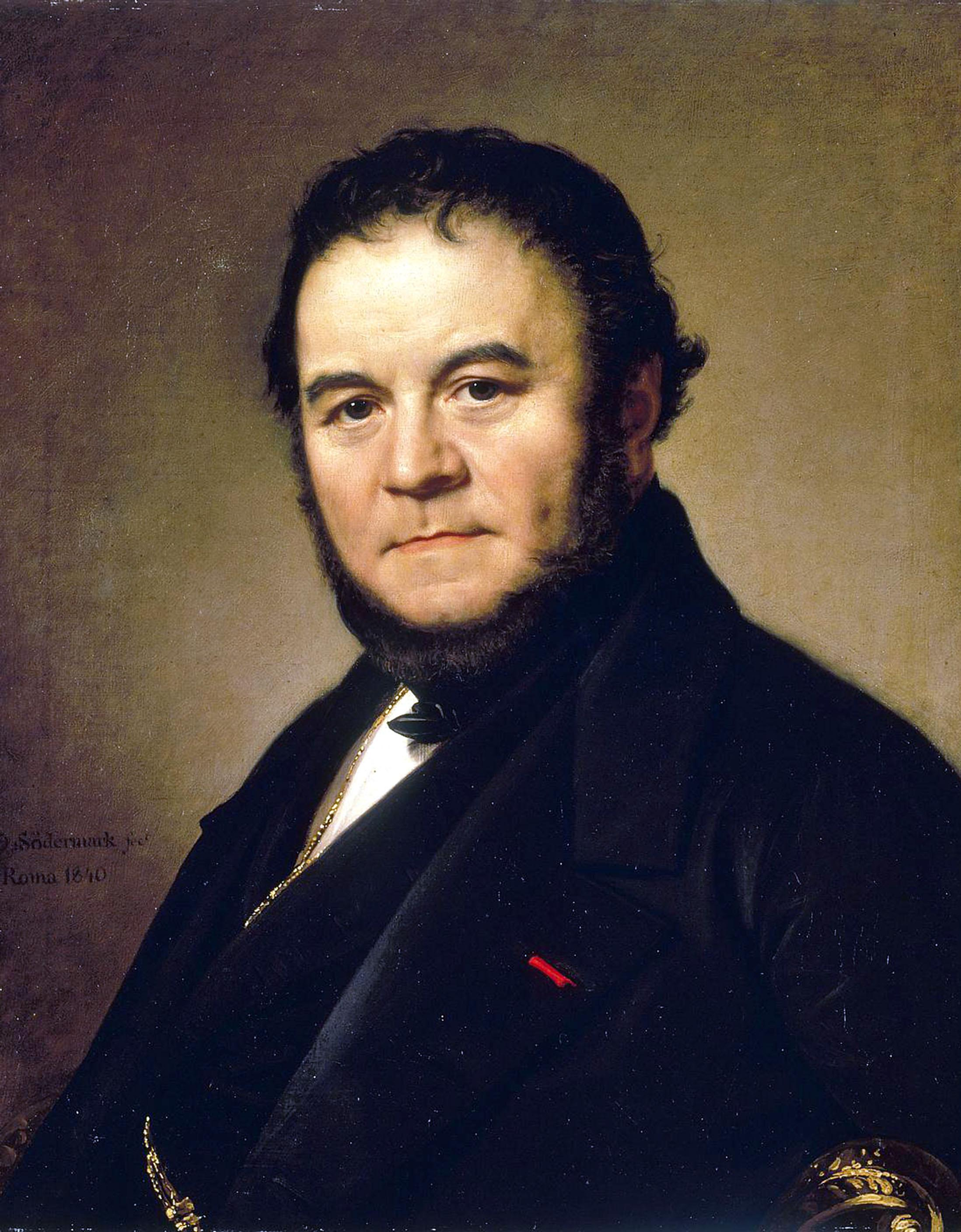
Stendhal.

Metilde is best known outside Italy as the great love of the French writer Stendhal (Marie-Henri Beyle). Stendhal met her in Milan in 1818 and became infatuated, pursuing her for years despite her lack of reciprocal feelings. His obsession with Metilde inspired his treatise De l'amour (1822), which explores the psychology of romantic love and is considered a foundational text in the literature of passion.

Stendhal's pursuit included a notorious episode in which he followed her to Volterra in disguise, only to be rebuffed and forbidden from further visits.

== Death ==
Metilde Viscontini Dembowski died in Milan on 1 May 1825 at the age of 35. She was remembered by contemporaries for her beauty, kindness, and patriotic fervor. The countess Frecavalli, a friend, wrote that she "died in my arms, still beautiful, called to remain by her two beloved sons... She also loved the glory of her country and the men who could bring it honor, and her energetic soul suffered too much from her enslavement and her loss".

Stendhal wrote in his copy of De l'amour: "Death of the author."

== In literature ==
Metilde's life and her relationship with Stendhal have been the subject of numerous studies, biographies, and literary essays. Her role as Stendhal's muse is considered pivotal in the development of his theory of love, particularly the concept of "crystallization" described in De l'amour.
