= A Life of Napoleon =

Book about Napoleon by Stendhal

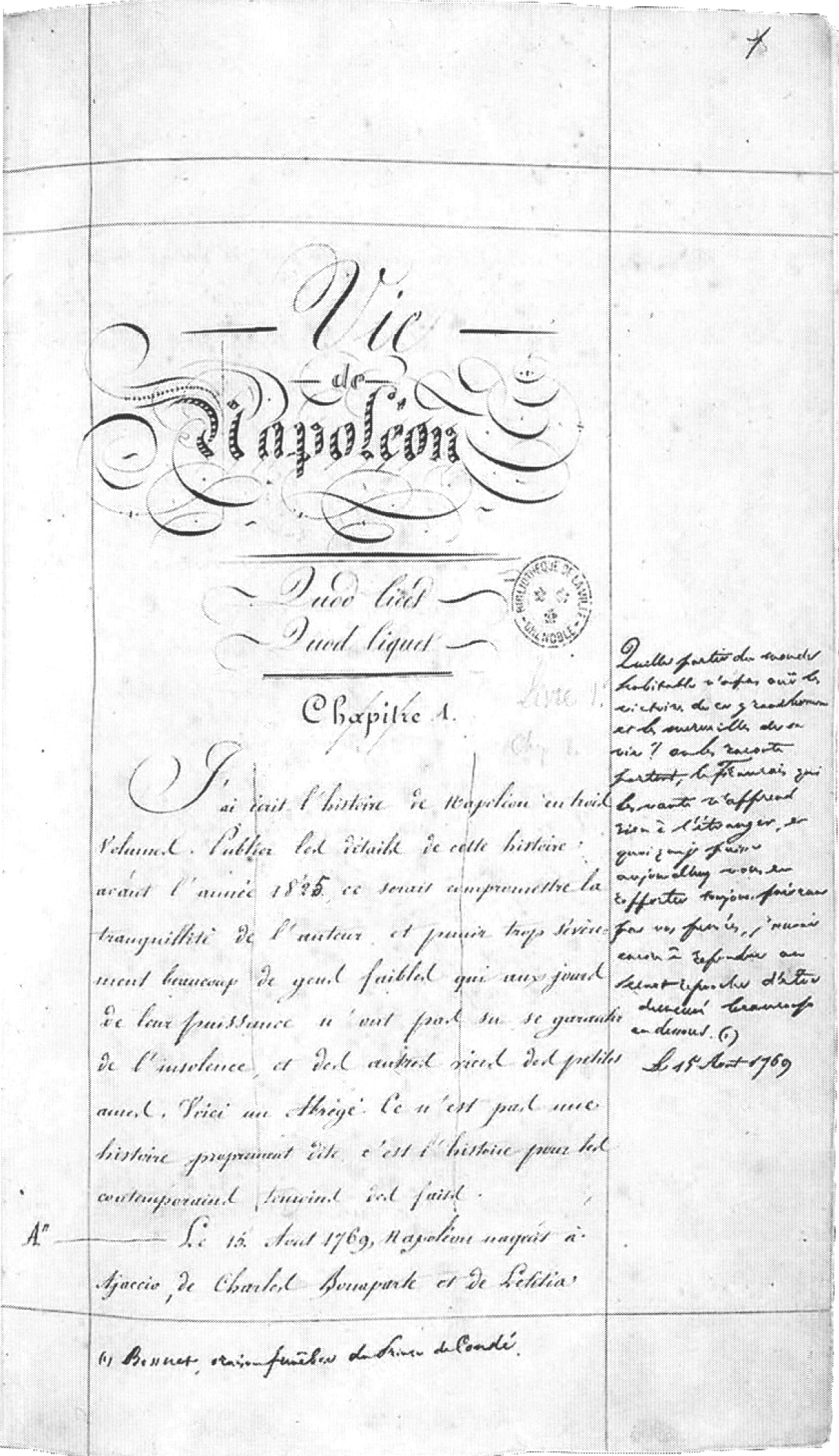
- Manuscript of A Life of Napoleon annotated by Henri Marie Beyle
- Author: Stendhal (Henri Marie Beyle)
- Original title: La vie de Napoléon
- Language: French
- Published: 1876
- Publication place: France

A Life of Napoleon (french: Vie de Napoléon) is a book by Stendhal (Marie-Henri Beyle), in 1817-1818. It was one of two essays that Stendhal devoted to the Emperor, with Mémoires sur Napoléon (1836-1837) being the second. Stendhal followed Napoleon's campaigns in Italy, Germany, Russia and Austria. After the fall of Napoleon, he retired to Italy. He was appointed Consul at Civitavecchia after the 1830 revolution, but his health deteriorated and six years later he was back in Paris working on his Life of Napoleon. It would not be published until long after his death by Romain Colomb, friend, cousin and legatee of Stendhal.

== Background ==
Marie-Henri Beyle was born on 23 January 1783 in Grenoble, France. He is better known by his pen name Stendhal. Beyle served as a lieutenant under Napoleon, from the heroic crossing of the Alps into Italy to the campaigns of Russia, and Austria. Around 1818, Beyle, who was thirty-three years old and living in Milan, began writing the Life of Napoleon to respond to Madame de Staël who, in a violent posthumous libel Considerations on the Principal Events of the French Revolution, had attacked the Emperor.

Twenty years later, during the late 1830s, Stendhal returns to his project, encouraged by the new public provisions of the July Monarchy and the abundance of sources of information. He presents himself to the reader as a former soldier, witness, and actor of Napoleon's deeds. However, the tone is different: the always enthusiastic admirer of General Bonaparte is more critical of the Emperor who, by founding a dynasty, has, according to him, renounced being "son of the Revolution".

== Content ==
About the stages of civilization defined by Beyle in the book, author Michael Valdez Moses, Professor of English at Duke University, summarized:

In his Life of Napoleon, Stendhal argues that civilization passes through three distinct stages. The first is primitive democracy or despotism, the second aristocracy under one or more rulers, and the third (and presumably final) one is representative government. Napoleon represents for Stendhal the last grand figure in the second stage of history, the nineteenth-century tyrant who paradoxically brings about the third phase of civilization.

== Bibliography ==
- Michael Valdez Moses (1995). The Novel and the Globalization of Culture. Oxford University Press. ISBN 978-0-19-535828-5.
- Harold Bloom (2009). Stendhal: Comprehensive Research and Study Guide. Infobase Publishing. ISBN 978-1-4381-1608-2.
- Robert Alter; Carol Cosman (1986). A Lion for Love: A Critical Biography of Stendhal. Harvard University Press. ISBN 978-0-674-53575-6.
- Robert Leroux (2012). French Liberalism in the 19th Century: An Anthology. Routledge. ISBN 978-0-415-68742-3.
