= Miracle in Viggiù =

1951 film

- Directed by: Luigi Giachino
- Written by: Dino Falconi; Luigi Giachino; Agostino Richelmy; Vincenzo Rovi
- Produced by: Franco Cancellieri
- Starring: Teddy Reno; Silvana Pampanini; Antonella Lualdi.
- Cinematography: Domenico Scala
- Edited by: Loris Bellero
- Music by: Lelio Luttazzi
- Production company: Produzione Cancellieri
- Distributed by: Indipendenti Regionali
- Release date: 31 August 1951
- Running time: 92 minutes
- Country: Italy
- Language: Italian

Miracle in Viggiù (Italian: Miracolo a Viggiù) is a 1951 Italian comedy film by Luigi Giachino and starring Teddy Reno, Silvana Pampanini and Antonella Lualdi. The film's sets were designed by the art director Mario Grazzini.

== Cast ==
- Teddy Reno as Sonny Boy
- Silvana Pampanini as Pinuccia
- Antonella Lualdi as Antonella
- Beniamino Maggio as Amleto
- Adriana Serra as Flora
- Enzo Furlai as Krauss

== Bibliography ==
- Chiti, Roberto & Poppi, Roberto. Dizionario del cinema italiano: Dal 1945 al 1959. Gremese Editore, 1991.
