= The Pink and the Green =

Unfinished novel by Stendhal

Le Rose et le Vert
- Author: Stendhal (Henri Beyle)
- Original title: Le Rose et le Vert
- Language: French
- Genre: Novel
- Publication date: 1837
- Publication place: France
- Preceded by: Lucien Leuwen
- Followed by: The Charterhouse of Parma

Le Rose et le Vert (French for The Pink and the Green) is an unfinished novel by Stendhal.

== Background and composition ==
The Pink and the Green was written in 1837, after Stendhal had abandoned Lucien Leuwen in 1834 and before completing The Charterhouse of Parma the following year. The novel began as a reworking of a story entitled "Mina de Vanghel", which Stendhal had written immediately after The Red and the Black. Stendhal completed approximately one hundred pages and estimated that he had maybe 800 more before it would be finished. The meaning of the title is unclear. Stendhal also considered giving the novel the title The Rose of the North, which he called "a flat and pretentious title... which seemed fine to me yesterday".

== Plot ==
The story concerns Mina Wanghen, an 18-year-old rich Prussian heiress in the 1830s with a romantic spirit and inclinations to radical political thought. She is disgusted by the love of money that she suspects motivates the many suitors who pursue her and her large dowry. When she relocates to Paris, Abbé Miossince, a worldly priest, becomes determined to convert her to Roman Catholicism and make a match between her and the Duke of Montenotte. The Duke, the son of a Napoleonic general, has a similar distaste for money, and when he hears about Mina from the Abbé, he goes off to his club and settles down with a map of Prussia. Not long afterward, the young couple meet at a ball. Stendhal did not develop the story further.
