= Maria Giovanna Maglie =

Italian journalist (1952–2023)

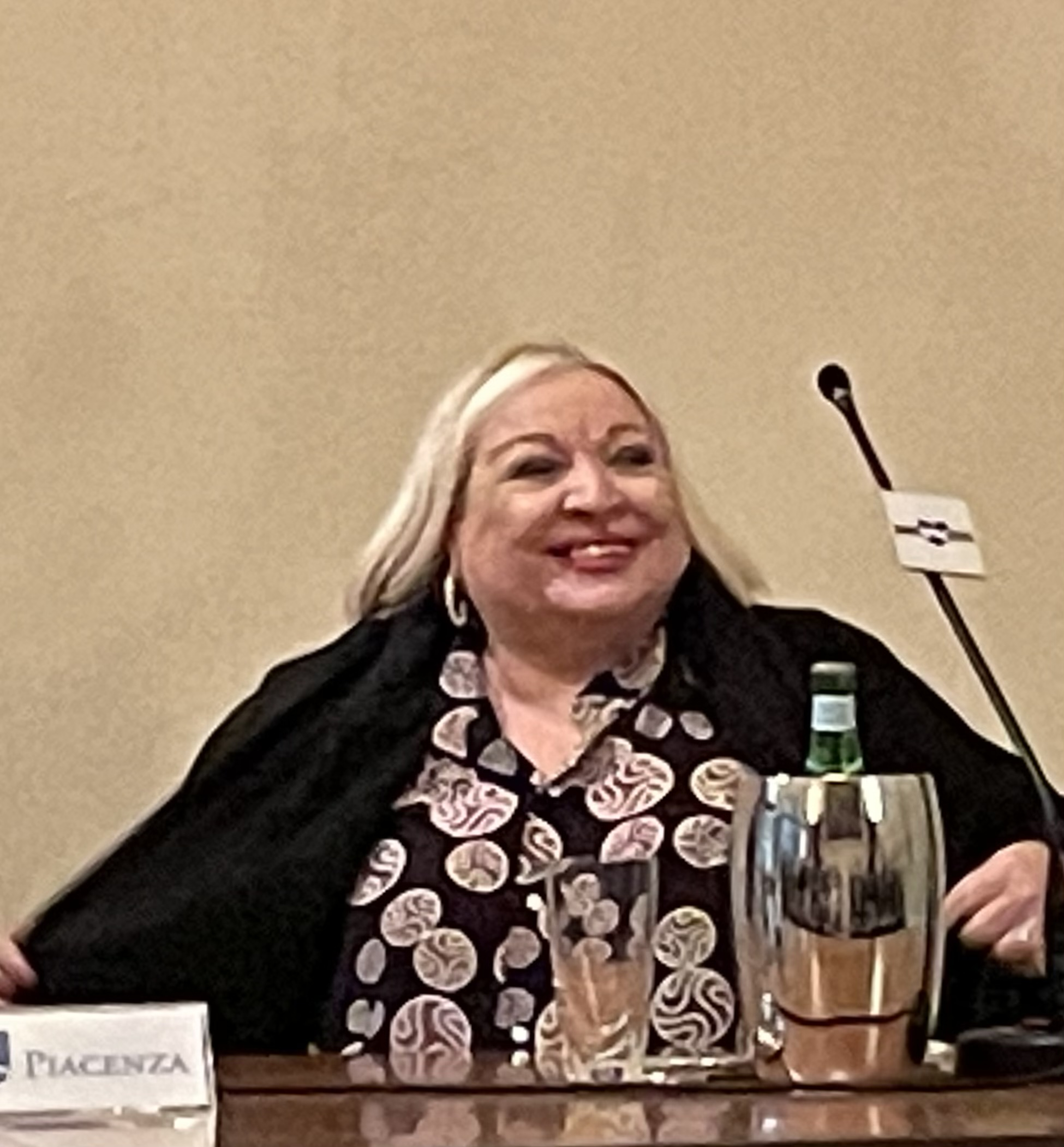
Maglie in 2021

Maria Giovanna Maglie (3 August 1952 – 23 May 2023) was an Italian right-wing essayist, commentator and journalist.

She was born in Venice on 3 August 1952. After studying in Rome, she entered journalism in 1979 and worked in the United States, Latin America and the Middle East.

She died of a heart condition on 23 May 2023 at the San Camillo hospital in Rome. Her funeral was celebrated in the Basilica of Santa Maria in Montesanto two days later.
