= Lucien Leuwen =

1894 novel by Stendhal

- Author: Stendhal
- Language: French
- Genre: Novel
- Published: 1894 (posthumous)
- Publication place: France
- Preceded by: The Red and the Black
- Followed by: The Pink and the Green

Lucien Leuwen is the second major novel written by French author Stendhal in 1834, following The Red and the Black (1830). It remained unfinished due to the political culture of the July Monarchy in the 1830s and Stendhal's fears of losing his government position by offending the administration. It was published posthumously in 1894.

== Plot ==
The book describes the career of Lucien, the son of a Parisian banker, in the years following the July Revolution of 1830 that brought Louis Philippe I to the throne. Lucien is expelled from the École Polytechnique after taking part in an anti-government demonstration following the funeral of General Lamarque. After two years of idleness he joins the army, and falls off a horse as his regiment enters the city of Nancy because he is gazing at "a young blonde with magnificent hair and a disdainful look". He falls in love with this young widow, who is named Mme de Chasteller, although he is forced to renounce her. Lucien then returns to Paris and becomes principal private secretary to the Minister of the Interior. Stendhal planned a last section that would show Lucien in Italy and resolve the story with a happy reunion with Mme de Chasteller, but it was never written.

== Background and composition ==
Stendhal wrote Lucien Leuwen while serving as consul for Louis-Philippe in Civitavecchia. "I’m making the first draft too long," Stendhal wrote about Lucien Leuwen in his journal. "In Marseilles, in 1828 I think, I made the manuscript of the Rouge too short. When I wanted to get it printed in Lutèce [Paris], I had to add to it instead of cutting a few pages and correcting the style ... That is why I’m making this 200 pages too long, so that when I take it to Paris, after either I or the J [July Monarchy] fall, I will have only two things to do: 1. Cut pages and phrases; 2. Make the style clearer still and more flowing, less abrupt."

Stendhal wound up only revising the first part. The July Monarchy lasted until the French Revolution of 1848, six years after Stendhal's death, and Stendhal could not afford to risk his official post in Civitavecchia. The novel as we have it consists of the original draft of the first two parts.
