= De l'amour (Stendhal) =

Treatise on love by Stendhal (1822)

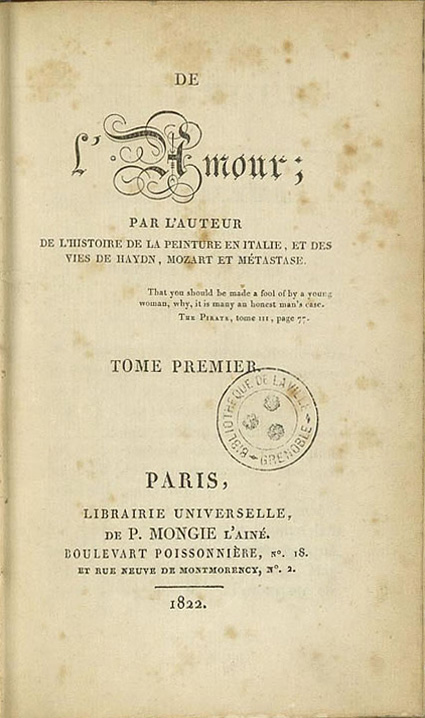
- Cover page of De l'amour, 1822 (Bibliothèque municipale de Grenoble)
- Author: Stendhal (Marie-Henri Beyle)
- Original title: De l'amour
- Language: French
- Subject: Philosophy of love, psychology
- Genre: Essay, philosophical treatise
- Publication date: 1822
- Publication place: France

De l'amour (English: On Love) is a treatise by French writer Stendhal, published in 1822. The work explores the psychology of romantic love, and was inspired by Stendhal's unrequited love for Italian aristocrat Metilde Viscontini Dembowski. It introduces the concept of "crystallization", a process through which lovers idealize their beloved.

The book remains a foundational text in the study of love as a psychological phenomenon.

== Background ==
Stendhal wrote De l'amour during his self-imposed exile in Milan after Metilde Viscontini Dembowski rejected his romantic advances. His obsession with Dembowski, a Carbonari activist and muse, fueled his analysis of love's irrationality. The book was composed in 1821 and published under the pen name Stendhal in Paris the following year, but initially received little attention.

== Content ==
The treatise is divided into two parts, one on the nature of love and another on a broader social commentary on norms surrounding relationships.

=== Part 1: Typology and psychology of love ===
Stendhal categorizes love into four types:

1. Physical love (purely sexual attraction).
2. Amour-goût ("love as a social game", a superficial affection driven by social conventions).
3. Vanity love (pursuit of relationships for status or pride).
4. Passion-love (the ideal form, characterized by intense emotional investment and selflessness).

He further outlines seven stages of passion-love, culminating in "crystallization" — the mental process where the lover attributes perfection to the beloved, akin to salt crystals transforming a bare branch into something radiant.

=== Part 2: Social and philosophical commentary ===
Stendhal critiques contemporary marriage norms and advocates for women's education and moral autonomy. He argues that societal constraints stifle genuine passion and perpetuate inequality.

== Reception ==
Upon publication, De l'amour was largely ignored. Stendhal did not expect readers in his lifetime, once remarking that he had taken "a ticket in a lottery, in which the winning number is 1936".

The book gained posthumous recognition for its psychological insights, particularly the concept of crystallization, which influenced later writers and thinkers such as Søren Kierkegaard and Roland Barthes. Modern scholars regard it as a precursor to theories of romantic idealism and cognitive bias in love, now regarded as a form of positive illusions.
