= The Vicar of Wakefield (1910 film) =

The Vicar Of Wakefield
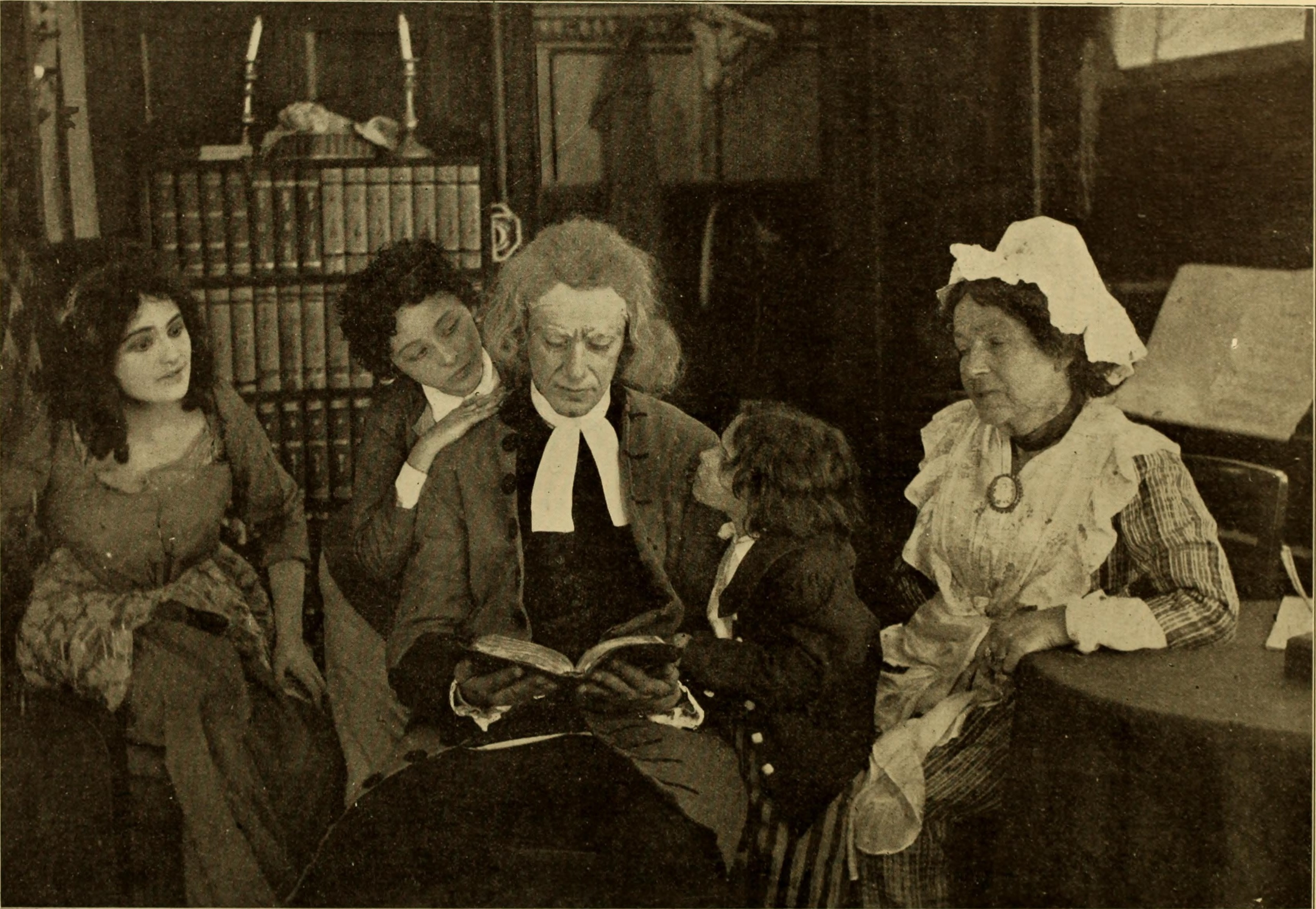
- A still from The Moving Picture World
- Produced by: Thanhouser Company
- Starring: Martin J. Faust
- Distributed by: Motion Picture Distributing and Sales Company
- Release date: December 27, 1910
- Running time: 13:20
- Country: United States
- Languages: Silent film English inter-titles

The Vicar Of Wakefield is a 1910 American silent short drama produced by the Thanhouser Company. The film was adapted from Oliver Goldsmith's 1766 novel The Vicar of Wakefield, but covers only part of the plot and deviates significantly from the book to allow the story to be told within the confines of a single reel of film.

The film begins with the vicar and his family heading to a picnic with Squire Thornhill, during the course of which the vicar notices Thornhill's interest in his daughter, Olivia. The vicar warns his family that Thornhill is a degenerate young man, but Olivia is seduced and elopes with Thornhill. Secretly, Thornhill arranges a fake marriage ceremony to capitalize on his sexual desires while avoiding the responsibility that would come with the union. Olivia learns the marriage was fake and that she has duped into a form of consensual prostitution with Thornhill, but escapes and returns home. (Note: Though not specifically covered in the film, the book makes clear that Olivia learns the marriage was fake the following morning, after consummating the marriage. Olivia then lives in Thornhill's home growing more melancholy, escaping before prostituting herself to an acquaintance of Thornhill. The scene in the movie shows a version of this, but not the other women duped by Thornhill.) Thornhill decides to take his revenge by having the vicar incarcerated for his debts. While in prison, the vicar learns that the marriage was in fact legitimate; Thornhill's uncle, Sir William, then forces his nephew to apologize to Olivia and fulfill his obligations.

The identities of most of the cast are known, but the role of director, often erroneously credited to Theodore Marston is not. The film was released on December 27, 1910 and met with positive reviews. The surviving print is in the Nederlands Filmmuseum and has been released on DVD.

== Plot ==
The Thanhouser production is an adaptation of only part of the novel. The film departs significantly from the original plot, such as in the omission of the double-wedding scene. It begins with Dr Charles Primrose, the vicar of Wakefield, attending a picnic with his landlord Squire Thornhill. The vicar does not like Squire Thornhill, who is reputed to be a degenerate young man, but he has no reservations once he sees Thornhill's interest in his daughter, Olivia. The next scene shows Squire Thornhill convincing Olivia to elope with him, so the two can be married. But Squire Thornhill has no intention of marrying her, and commissions a farmer to arrange a fake wedding ceremony. The farmer accepts, but shakes his fist in anger at the squire after he has departed.

Squire Thornhill leaves in a carriage with Olivia, whose departure is soon reported to the rest of the family. Stricken with grief, the vicar heads off to reclaim his wayward daughter. At the end of the marriage ceremony the farmer receives his payment, and the squire and Olivia embrace. The vicar arrives shortly afterwards, but after failing to persuade his daughter to return home with him leaves in despair. Olivia learns later that the marriage was a sham, but continues to live in Thornhill's house until he offers her as a prostitute to an acquaintance of his. Olivia flees in a rage and returns home, where she is reunited with her family. (Note: These scenes are very different from the book, the other women are not shown and Olivia's learning of the sham is not depicted. Only the scene in which the Baronet proposes Olivia's prostitution is shown, but this differs from the events in Chapter 21 of the book.) Thornhill, now out for revenge, has the vicar arrested and thrown into jail for unpaid debts.

Olivia goes to meet her father in prison, and upon exiting the farmer who had arranged the marriage between Olivia and Thornhill appears and gasps in shock. The vicar explains that Olivia is his daughter, and the farmer reveals his role in the plot, but that out of hatred for Thornhill he procured the services of a real priest to officiate at the wedding. The farmer heads to Thornhill's house and reveals that the marriage was in fact legitimate. Thornhill's uncle, Sir William, forces him to take responsibility for his actions and beg Olivia's forgiveness. Olivia accepts Thornhill's apology and the couple embrace and kiss. Although not in the surviving print, the synopsis concludes with "Sir William then discloses his identity and asks for the hand of Sophia [another of the vicar's daughters]. The vicar is released from prison, and he and his family look forward to a future of happiness and plenty."

== Cast ==
- Martin J. Faust as the vicar of Wakefield
- Frank H. Crane
- Anna Rosemond
- William Garwood
- Marie Eline
- Bertha Blanchard
- Lucille Younge
- William Russell

== Production ==
The film was adapted from Oliver Goldsmith's novel The Vicar of Wakefield. The complex plot was broken down to a single-reel adaptation by Edwin Thanhouser and/or Lloyd Lonergan. Edwin Thanhouser's wife Gertrude assisted with the scenarios and editing of the films, but it is not specifically known if she contributed to this production.

The film's director is unknown, but it may have been Barry O'Neil or Lucius J. Henderson. Credit is sometimes given to Theodore Marston, an error that apparently originates with the American Film-Index 1908–1915. Film historian Q. David Bowers consulted one of the co-authors of the book, Gunnar Lundquist, and confirmed that the credit of Marston as director was in error. Marston worked with Pathé, Kinemacolor of America, Vitagraph and other companies, but there is no record of him working with Thanhouser. This error has persisted in several works including The Complete Index to Literary Sources in Film. Cameramen employed by the company at the time the film was made include Blair Smith, Carl Louis Gregory and Alfred H. Moses, Jr., but the role of the cameraman was uncredited in 1910 productions. This production is unique for having the cast members known, because most of the credits in Thanhouser's 1910 productions are fragmentary.

== Release and reception ==
The single-reel drama, approximately 1,000 feet long, was released on December 27, 1910. The film likely had a wide national release, theaters are known to have shown the film in Pennsylvania, Kansas, Indiana, and South Dakota. The film received positive reviews from trade publications including The Moving Picture World, which praised the acting and the execution of the film as an education for audiences by exposing them to literary masterpieces. The New York Dramatic Mirror reviewer was less enthusiastic, writing that "The production gave a very praiseworthy portrayal of the period, but a moving picture needs such different treatment from a novel that its interpretation in a picture is bound to lose much of the original interest. The acting was in every way adequate, although not great."

The Complete Index to Literary Sources in Film lists this film as the first adaptation of the Vicar of Wakefield. It was followed by identically titled adaptations, including Pathé Frères's The Vicar Of Wakefield in 1912 and the Kinematograph Trading Company's The Vicar Of Wakefield in 1913, Ideal Film Company's The Vicar Of Wakefield in 1916. The Thanhouser Company reproduced The Vicar of Wakefield in 1917. The two Thanhouser films differ in more than just length, as the feature-length adaptation shows the progression of motion pictures from "essentially static tableaus, each announced by a title card, to a series of scenes and sequences analyzed by editing, most notably with vivid close-ups of the great stage actor Frederick Warde."

A surviving print held in the Nederlands Filmmuseum was the source of the modern re-release of film. It is 13 minutes 20 seconds long and features a new original score composed and performed by Raymond A. Brubacker. The film was released on DVD as Volume 4 of the Thanhouser Classics Video Collectors Set. It was also released as part of the Treasures from the Desmet Collection at the EYE Filmmuseum.

== See also ==
- List of American films of 1910
