= Venice New Year's Concert =

Annual event at Teatro La Fenice in Venice, Italy

Venice New Year's Concert Concerto di Capodanno del Teatro La Fenice di Venezia
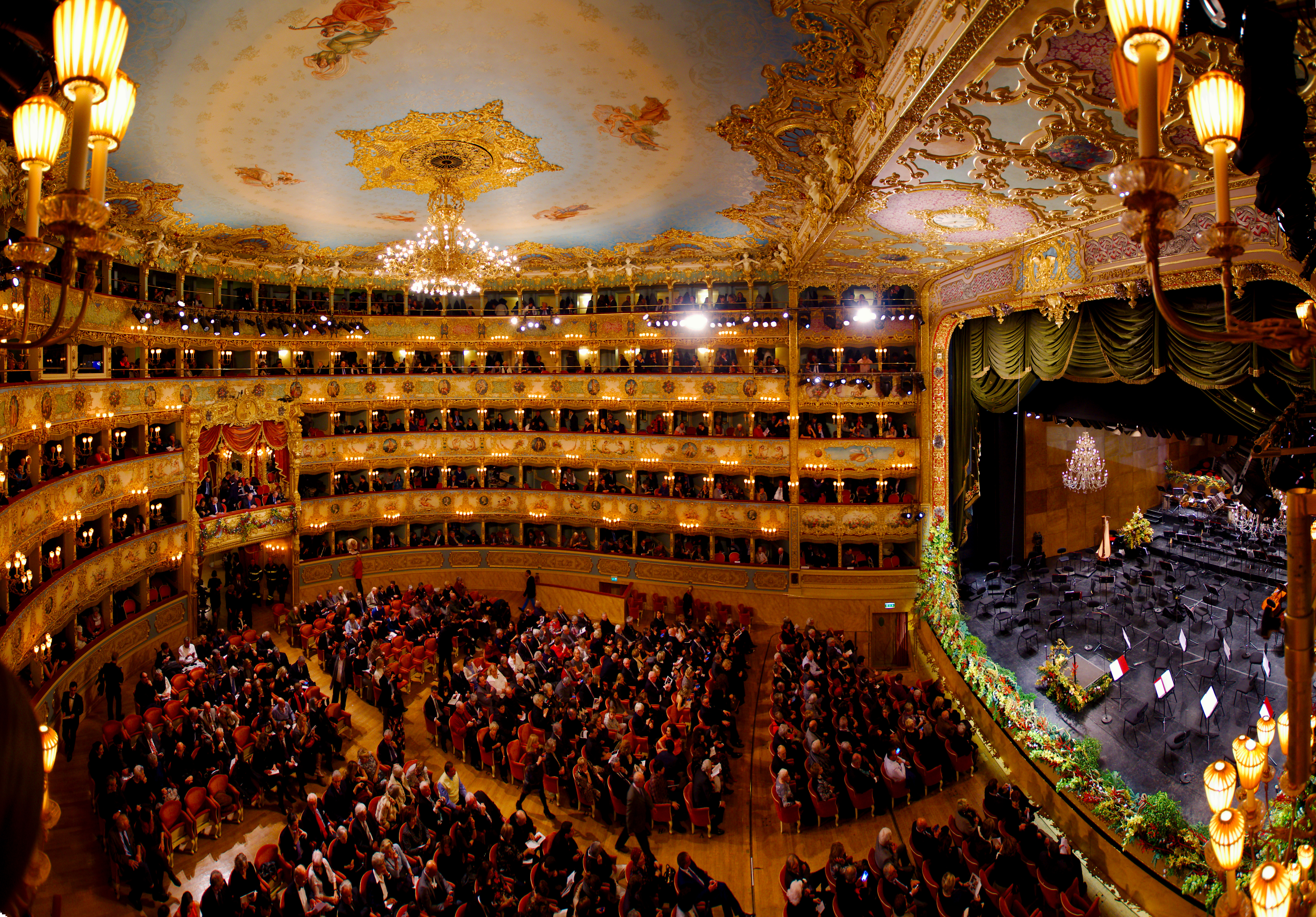
- New Year's Concert 2015
- Status: Active
- Genre: Music event
- Date: 1 January
- Frequency: Annual
- Venue: Teatro La Fenice
- Location: Venice
- Country: Italy
- Inaugurated: 1 January 2004; 22 years ago
- Organiser: Teatro La Fenice, RAI

The New Year's Concert of the Teatro La Fenice in Venice or Venice New Year's Concert is a traditional concert started in 2004 which takes place on 1 January of each year at the Teatro La Fenice.

== History ==
The New Year's Concert from the Teatro La Fenice of Venice was born as the closing event for the commemorations of the reconstruction of the theater following the arson that destroyed it on the evening of January 29, 1996. The idea came to Anna Elena Averardi, consultant for the care of the image of the Venetian theater and was welcomed by Fabrizio Del Noce, director of Rai 1.

Similar to the Vienna New Year's Concert, the January 1 concert in Venice can be collocated in a series of five identical concerts held on December 28 and 29 at 8pm, December 30 at 5pm, on 31 December at 16:00. It starts 11:15 AM, and is broadcast worldwide live from 12.20 by Rai 1. The music critic Pietro Acquafredda collaborated on the formulation of the concert program, from 2004 to 2014, commissioned by Rai 1.

The 2011 edition was dedicated to the 150th anniversary of Italian Independence (for the occasion the Italian anthem was played), while the 2013 edition was dedicated, in the opera section of the concert, to the music of Giuseppe Verdi to celebrate the bicentenary of his birth.

=== Orchestra Directors ===
- 2004: Lorin Maazel
- 2005: Georges Prêtre
- 2006: Kurt Masur
- 2007: Kazushi Ono
- 2008: Roberto Abbado
- 2009: Georges Prêtre
- 2010: John Eliot Gardiner
- 2011: Daniel Harding
- 2012: Diego Matheuz
- 2013: John Eliot Gardiner
- 2014: Diego Matheuz
- 2015: Daniel Harding
- 2016: James Conlon
- 2017: Fabio Luisi
- 2018: Myung-whun Chung
- 2019: Myung-whun Chung
- 2020: Myung-whun Chung
- 2021: Daniel Harding
- 2022: Fabio Luisi
- 2023: Daniel Harding
- 2024: Fabio Luisi
- 2025: Daniel Harding
- 2026: Michele Mariotti
- 2027: Gianandrea Noseda

== Structure ==
The concert program includes the performance of symphonies, symphonic arias and opera pieces. The concert consists of two parts: a first one that presents symphonic pieces or, in any case, only music interpreted by the orchestra, and a second one that focuses mainly on lyric opera pieces, where there are also solo singers and the theater choir. Traditionally it ends with the execution of two non-programmed fixed pieces: the first is the chorus of the Va, Pensiero from Nabucco by Giuseppe Verdi and the second is the famous toast of the Libiamo ne'lieti calici taken from Traviata, always by Verdi.

== Television broadcasting ==
Only the second part of the concert, that is dedicated to the opera, is broadcast live on Rai 1, and from 2014 on Rai 5 in the evening. The concert is also broadcast in France, Germany, Japan and Latin America. From 2016 the concert has been proposed on ARTE, ZDR, WSR, Radio France and by various radio and television broadcasters from Eastern European countries.

The concert is generally broadcast entirely on Rai 5 a month later.
