= Adriana Serra =

Italian actress (1923–1995)

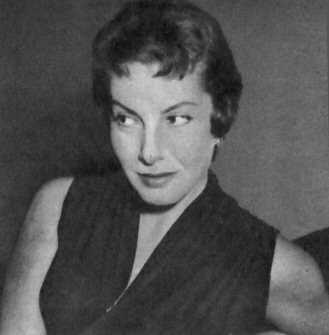
- Born: 27 November 1923; Milan, Italy
- Died: 13 November 1995 (aged 71); Endine Gaiano, Italy
- Occupation: Actress

Adriana Serra (27 November 1923 – 13 November 1995) was an Italian actress and television presenter. She appeared in 18 films between 1943 and 1951.

== Life and career ==
Born in Milan, in 1941 Serra was crowned Miss Italia, immediately receiving film offers and making her debut in La prigione, a film that eventually faced distribution problems. After the war, she became a diva of rivista, appearing on stage alongside Totò, Aldo Fabrizi, Nino Taranto and Tino Scotti. Starting from 1954, Serra dedicated herself to the then-nascent television, co-hosting with Mike Bongiorno the show Fortunatissimo and with Enzo Tortora the 1959 edition of the Sanremo Music Festival, and appearing on several TV-series and films.

== Filmography ==
- Apparition (1943)
- I'll Always Love You (1943)
- I Do Not Move (1943)
- La prigione (1944)
- The Innocent Casimiro (1945)
- The Models of Margutta (1946) (uncredited)
- Paese senza pace (1946)
- Il vento mi ha cantato una canzone (1947)
- Fifa e arena (1948)
- Eleven Men and a Ball (1948)
- The Firemen of Viggiù (1949)
- Se fossi deputato (1949)
- The Transporter (1950)
- Totò Tarzan (1950)
- Cintura di castità (1950)
- Miracle in Viggiù (1951)
- Abbiamo vinto! (1951)
- The Two Sergeants (1951)
