= The Vicar of Wakefield (TV series) =

- Genre: Historical drama
- Based on: The Vicar of Wakefield by Oliver Goldsmith
- Directed by: Guglielmo Morandi
- Country of origin: Italy
- Original language: Italian
- No. of series: 1
- No. of episodes: 4

Production
- Production company: RAI Radiotelevisione Italiana

Original release
- Network: RAI 1
- Release: 1 November – 22 November 1959

The Vicar of Wakefield (Italian: Il vicario di Wakefield) is an Italian television series which first aired on RAI 1 in 1959. It is based on the 1766 novel The Vicar of Wakefield by Anglo-Irish writer Oliver Goldsmith.

== Main cast ==
- Carlo D'Angelo
- Alberto Lupo
- Evi Maltagliati
- Ilaria Occhini
- Lily Tirinnanzi
- Mario Valdemarin

== Bibliography ==
- Massimo Emanuelli. 50 anni di storia della televisione attraverso la stampa settimanale. GRECO & GRECO Editori, 2004.
