= The Vicar of Wakefield =

1766 novel by Oliver Goldsmith

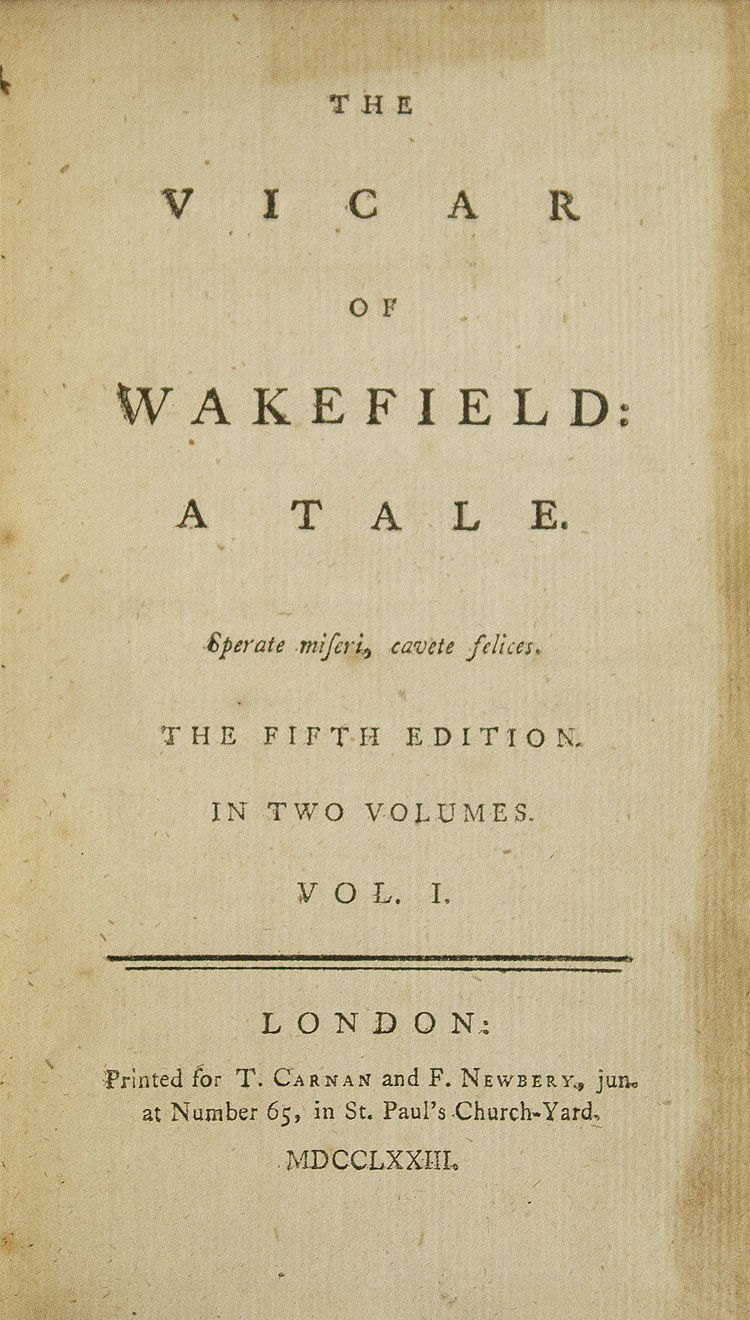
- Front title page of 1773 edition
- Author: Oliver Goldsmith
- Language: English
- Genre: Sentimentalism, comedy, satire, ruralism
- Published: 1766 (R. Collins)
- Publication place: Great Britain
- Media type: Print, octavo
- Pages: 437
- Dewey Decimal: 823.6
- LC Class: 647209259

The Vicar of Wakefield: A Tale, Supposed to Be Written by Himself is a 1766 sentimental novel by Anglo-Irish writer Oliver Goldsmith (1728–1774). It was written from 1761 to 1762 and published in London in 1766. It was one of the most popular and widely read 18th-century novels among the British citizenry, and remains a classic of English literature. The work also saw over 200 editions being printed during the same period and was considered a staple of English reading novels.

The novel follows the Primrose family's journey from wealth, joy, and prosperity to hardship, ruin, and social disgrace, ultimately culminating in their return to happiness and good social standing. Through a series of unexpected events and incidents, as well as the arrival of Sir William Thornhill, the family slowly overcome their difficulties and regain their former status. Goldsmith uses a variety of methods, including satire and comedy, to expose the moral failings, indifference, and hypocrisy of the upper classes, contrasting them with the Primrose family's plain but virtuous life.

The book consists of 32 chapters divided into three parts, and Samuel Johnson played a major role in its publication. Critics generally regarded the work as a fictitious memoir, narrated from the perspective of the Vicar. While it is categorised as a sentimental novel, it also has features of a satire, and has been used by scholars to explain the problem of evil. The work was noted for addressing the prevailing social and rural aspects of the time. It also idealised the portrayal of village life and the inherent goodness of its characters, particularly Charles Primrose and his family, while emphasising themes of faith, virtue, and resilience. Primrose, in particular, embodies Christian values and steadfastly maintains his integrity despite facing financial ruin, imprisonment, and the moral failings of his children.

The novel is Goldsmith’s best-known work, and has been adapted for drama and opera. It influenced scores of later English writers during the Victorian era, and is also studied in literary circles for its language and idyllic setting of British citizenry life during the 18th century. The characters in the work find mention in some of the best-known novels of the 19th century, including A Tale of Two Cities, Emma, Little Women, Middlemarch, and Frankenstein. Critics have often made comparisons between the themes of the novel and the Book of Job, particularly in philosophical terms. The work served as a notable predecessor to Gothic and Romantic literature as well, due to it challenging the ideals of rationalism.

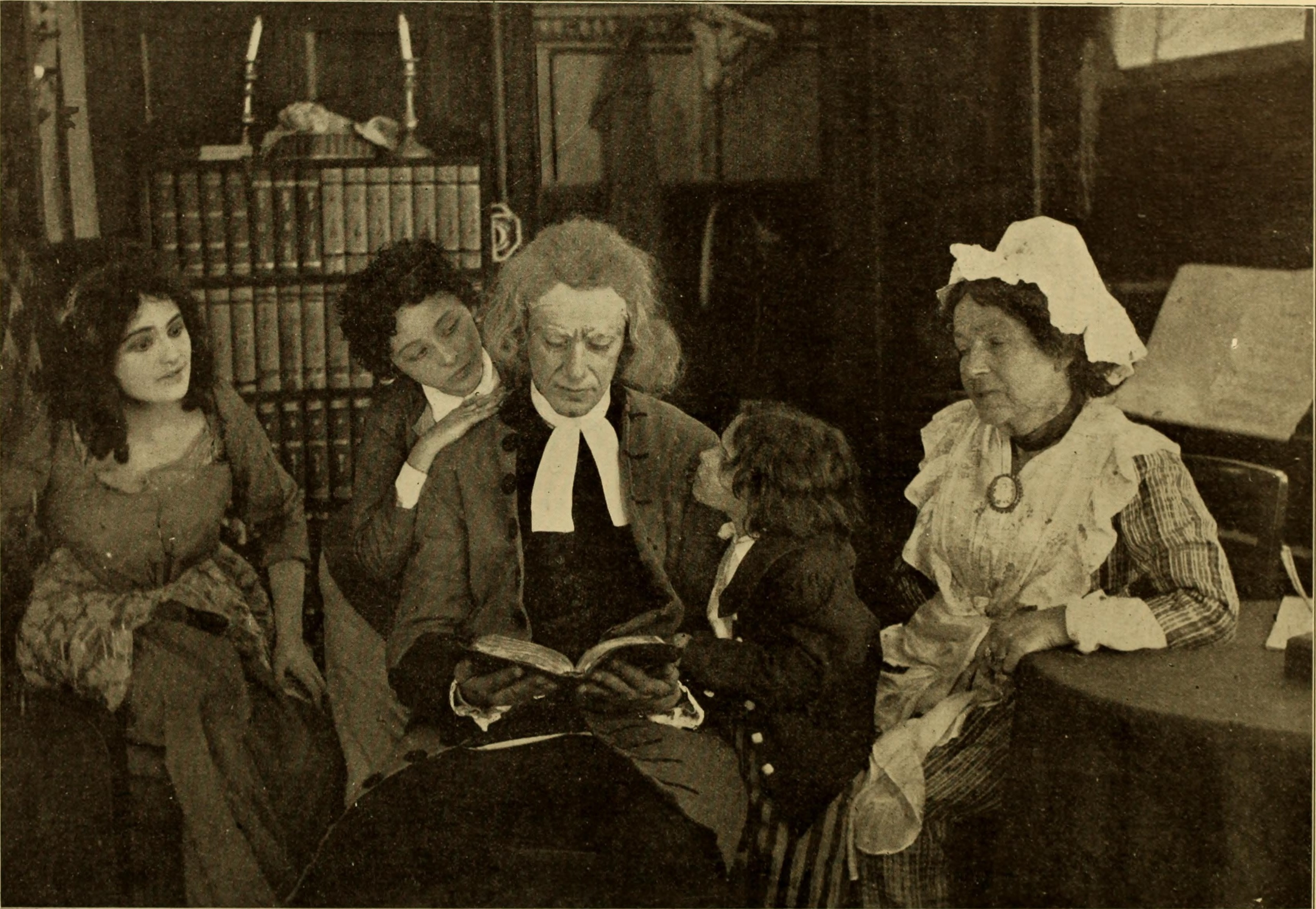
A still from the 1910 film adaptation of the novel The Vicar of Wakefield by the Thanhouser Company, New York.

== Publication ==
Dr. Samuel Johnson, one of Goldsmith's closest friends, told how The Vicar of Wakefield came to be sold for publication:

I received one morning a message from poor Goldsmith that he was in great distress, and, as it was not in his power to come to me, begging that I would come to him as soon as possible. I sent him a guinea, and promised to come to him directly. I accordingly went as soon as I was dressed, and found that his landlady had arrested him for his rent, at which he was in a violent passion: I perceived that he had already changed my guinea, and had a bottle of Madeira and a glass before him. I put the cork into the bottle, desired he would be calm, and began to talk to him of the means by which he might be extricated. He then told me he had a novel ready for the press, which he produced to me. I looked into it and saw its merit; told the landlady I should soon return; and, having gone to a bookseller, sold it for sixty pounds. I brought Goldsmith the money, and he discharged his rent, not without rating his landlady in a high tone for having used him so ill.

The novel was The Vicar of Wakefield, and Johnson had sold it to Francis Newbery, nephew of publisher John Newbery. Newbery "kept it by him for nearly two years unpublished".

The 1929 edition was illustrated by Arthur Rackham (1867–1939).

== Plot summary ==
William Powell Frith: Measuring Heights, 1842 (a scene from Chapter 16: Olivia Primrose and Squire Thornhill standing back to back, so that Mrs. Primrose can determine who is taller)

The Vicar – Dr. Charles Primrose – lives an idyllic life in a country parish with his wife Deborah, sons George (eldest), Moses, Bill, and Dick, and daughters Olivia and Sophia. He is wealthy due to investing an inheritance he received from a deceased relative, and he donates the £35 that his job pays annually to the widows and orphans of local clergy. On the evening before George's wedding to wealthy Arabella Wilmot, the Vicar loses all his money through the bankruptcy of his merchant investor who has left town abruptly. In the novel, Primrose embodies Christian values and steadfastly maintains his integrity despite facing financial ruin, imprisonment, and the moral failings of his children.

The wedding is called off by Arabella's father, who is known for his prudence with money. George, who was educated at Oxford and is old enough to be considered an adult, is sent away to town. The rest of the family move to a new and more humble parish on the land of Squire Thornhill, who is known to be a womanizer. On the way, they hear about the dubious reputation of their new landlord. Also, references are made to the squire's uncle Sir William Thornhill, who is known throughout the country for his worthiness and generosity.

A poor and eccentric friend, Mr. Burchell, whom they meet at an inn, rescues Sophia from drowning. She is instantly attracted to him, but her ambitious mother does not encourage her feelings.

Then follows a period of happy family life, interrupted only by regular visits of the dashing Squire Thornhill and Mr. Burchell. Olivia is captivated by the hollow charm of Thornhill, who encourages the social ambitions of Mrs. Primrose and her daughters to a ludicrous degree.

Finally, Olivia is reported to have fled. First Burchell is suspected, but after a long pursuit Dr. Primrose finds his daughter, who was in fact deceived by Squire Thornhill. He planned to marry her in a mock ceremony and leave her shortly after, as he had done with several women before.

When Olivia and her father return home, they find their house in flames. Although the family has lost almost all their belongings, the evil Squire Thornhill insists on the payment of the rent. As the vicar cannot pay, he is brought to prison.

A series of dreadful developments follows. The vicar's daughter, Olivia, is reported dead, Sophia is abducted, and George too is sent to prison in chains and covered with blood, as he had challenged Thornhill to a duel when he had heard about his wickedness.

Then Mr. Burchell arrives and solves all problems. He rescues Sophia, Olivia is not dead, and it emerges that Mr. Burchell is in reality the worthy Sir William Thornhill, who travels through the country in disguise. In the end, there is a double wedding: George marries Arabella, as he originally intended, and Sir William Thornhill marries Sophia. Squire Thornhill's servant turns out to have tricked him, and what the Squire thought to be a sham marriage of himself and Olivia is in fact valid. Finally, even the wealth of the vicar is restored, as the bankrupt merchant is reported found.

== Structure and narrative technique ==
The book consists of 32 chapters which fall into three parts:

- Chapters 1–3: beginning
- Chapters 4–29: main part
- Chapters 30–32: ending

Chapter 17, when Olivia is reported to be fled, can be regarded as the climax as well as an essential turning point of the novel. From chapter 17 onward it changes from a comical account of eighteenth-century country life into a pathetic melodrama with didactic traits.

There are quite a few interpolations of different literary genres, such as poems, histories or sermons, which widen the restricted view of the first person narrator and serve as didactic fables.

The novel can be regarded as a fictitious memoir, as it is told by the vicar himself by retrospection.

== Main characters ==
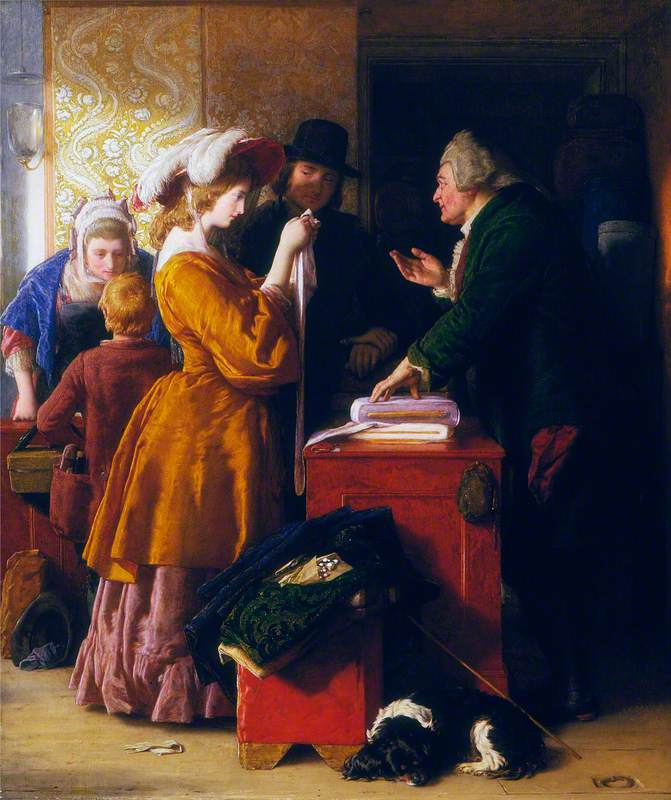
Choosing the Wedding Gown by William Mulready, 1845, an illustration of Ch. 1

=== Charles Primrose ===
He is the vicar in the title, and the narrator of the story. He presents one of the most harmlessly simple and unsophisticated yet also ironically complex figures ever to appear in English fiction. He has a mild, forgiving temper, as seen when he forgives his daughter Olivia with open arms. He is a loving husband and a father of six healthy, blooming children. However, though he usually has a sweet, benevolent temper, he can sometimes be a bit silly, stubborn, or vain. For instance, he is obsessed with a particularly obscure, and not very important, matter of church doctrine. One of his "favourite topics", he declares, is matrimony, and explains that he is proud of being "a strict monogamist" (in the sense that he is opposed to remarriage of any sort and believes scripture allows only one marriage partner for a person's lifetime). He tactlessly adheres to his "principles" in the face of a violent disagreement with the neighbour who was soon to become his son's father-in-law (who is about to be married a fourth time). He "...was called out by one of my relations, who, with a face of concern, advised me to give up the dispute, at least till my son's wedding was over." However, he angrily cries that he will not "relinquish the cause of truth", and hotly says, "You might as well advise me to give up my fortune as my argument." This is ironic, as he immediately finds out that his fortune has been unexpectedly reduced to almost nothing. This makes Mr. Wilmot break off the intended marriage with Mr. Primrose's son George and Miss Arabella Wilmot, and thus his son's happiness is almost shattered. He is sometimes proud of what he fancies is his ability at arguing, and often misjudges his family's supposed friends and neighbours. However, despite all his faults, he is affectionate, faithful, loving, patient and essentially good-natured.

=== Deborah Primrose ===
Dr. Charles Primrose's wife. She is faithful, if still rather independent-minded. She has some vanity of her own, however: she has a "passion" for clothes, and is seen making a "wash" for her girls. She is also eager to see her daughters splendidly married, and this ambition sometimes blinds her. Dr. Charles Primrose refers to her as "a good-natured notable woman; and as for breeding, there were few country ladies who could shew (show) more. She could read any English book without much spelling, but for pickling, preserving, and cookery, none could excel her." She is even prouder of her children than her husband, especially her beautiful girls.

=== Olivia and Sophia Primrose ===
Their father originally wished to name each after their aunt Grissel, but other considerations prevented him. They are affectionate, generally dutiful daughters. Of his daughters, the vicar claims, "Olivia...had that luxuriancy of beauty with which painters generally draw Hebe; open, sprightly, and commanding ... Sophia's features were not so striking at first; but often did more certain execution; for they were soft, modest, and alluring. The one vanquished by a single blow, the other by efforts successfully repeated...Olivia wished for many lovers, Sophia to secure one. Olivia was often affected from too great a desire to please. Sophia even represt [repressed] excellence from her fears to offend." They both alike reflect their father's nature of being good-hearted, though prone to occasional fault; Olivia runs away with Mr. Thornhill in a rush of impetuous passion, and even the more sensible Sophia joins in with making "a wash" for herself and dressing up in fancy clothes.

== Reception ==
In literary history books, The Vicar of Wakefield is often described as a sentimental novel, which displays the belief in the innate goodness of human beings. But it can also be read as a satire on the sentimental novel and its values, as the vicar's values are apparently not compatible with the real sinful world. It is only with Sir William Thornhill's help that he can get out of his calamities. Moreover, an analogy can be drawn between Mr. Primrose's suffering and the Book of Job. This is particularly relevant to the question of why evil exists.

The novel is mentioned in "The Romance of Certain Old Clothes" by Henry James, George Eliot's Middlemarch, Stendhal's The Life of Henry Brulard, Arthur Schopenhauer's "The Art of Being Right", Jane Austen's Emma, Charles Dickens' A Tale of Two Cities and David Copperfield, Mary Shelley's Frankenstein, Sarah Grand's The Heavenly Twins, Charlotte Brontë's The Professor and Villette, Louisa May Alcott's Little Women and in Johann Wolfgang von Goethe's The Sorrows of Young Werther, as well as his Dichtung und Wahrheit. Goethe wrote:

"Now Herder came, and together with his great knowledge brought many other aids and the later publications besides. Among these he announced to us the Vicar of Wakefield as an excellent work, with a German translation of which he would make us acquainted by reading it aloud to us himself. … A Protestant country clergyman is, perhaps the most beatific subject for a modern idyl; he appears, like Melchizedek, as priest and king in one person." The Autobiography of Johann Goethe, p. 368 ff.

== Adaptations ==
A play The Vicar of Wakefield: A drama in 3 parts (1850) by Joseph Stirling Coyne. Silent film adaptations of the novel were produced in 1910, in 1913, and in 1916.

In 1959 an Italian television series The Vicar of Wakefield was broadcast.

Composer Liza Lehmann composed a 1906 comic light opera The Vicar of Wakefield to a libretto by Laurence Housman.
