= List of Italian films of 1964 =

Following is a sortable list of films produced in Italy in 1964.

Title	Italian-language title	Director	Cast	Genre	Notes
Agent 38-24-36	Une ravissante idiote	Édouard Molinaro	Brigitte Bardot Anthony Perkins Grégoire Aslan	comedy	
All About Loving	De l'amour	Jean Aurel		comedy	
All the Other Girls Do!	Oltraggio al pudore	Silvio Amadio	Rosemary Dexter Jacques Perrin		
Among Vultures	Là dove scende il sole	Alfred Vohrer		Western	
—N/a	Amori pericolosi	Alfredo Giannetti, Carlo Lizzani, Giulio Questi		—N/a	Italian-French co-production
Anatomy of a Marriage: My Days with Jean-Marc	La vie conjugale	André Cayatte			
Angélique, the Marquise of the Angels	Angélique, marquise des anges	Bernard Borderie			
The Ape Woman	La donna scimmia	Marco Ferreri			Entered into the 1964 Cannes Film Festival
Before the Revolution	Prima della rivoluzione	Bernardo Bertolucci	Adriana Asti, Francesco Barilli, Allen Midgette	drama	
The Betrothed	I promessi sposi	Mario Maffei	Gil Vidal, Maria Silva	Historical	Co-production with Spain
Blood and Black Lace	6 donne per l'assassino	Mario Bava	Cameron Mitchell, Eva Bartok	Thriller	Italian-West German-French co-production
Buffalo Bill	Buffalo Bill, l'eroe del far west	Mario Costa	Gordon Scott Catherine Ribeiro	Traditional Western	Italian/French/West German co-production
Castle of Blood	Danza macabra	Antonio Margheriti	Barbara Steele, Georges Rivière	Horror	
Castle of the Living Dead	Il castello dei morti vivi	Warren Kiefer	Christopher Lee, Gaia Germani, Philippe Leroy	Horror	Italian-French co-production
The Cavern	Sette contro la morte	Edgar G. Ulmer	John Saxon, Rosanna Schiaffino, Brian Aherne	War drama	American/German/Italian
Circle of Love	La ronde	Roger Vadim			
Code Name:Tiger	Le Tigre aime la chair fraiche	Claude Chabrol	Roger Hanin Daniela Bianchi	Eurospy	French/Italian co-production
Corpse for the Lady	Cadavere per signora	Mario Mattoli		comedy	
The Death Ray of Dr. Mabuse	Die Todesstrahlen des Dr. Mabuse	Hugo Fregonese Victor De Santis	Peter van Eyck Yvonne Furneaux	Dr. Mabuse	West German/Italian co-production
Devil of the Desert Against the Son of Hercules	Anthar l'invincibile	Antonio Margheriti (as Anthony M. Dawson)	Kirk Morris Michèle Girardon	Sword and Sandal	
Diary of a Chambermaid	Il diario di una cameriera	Luis Buñuel			
Dog Eat Dog	Einer frisst den anderen	Gustav Gavrin	Jayne Mansfield Cameron Mitchell	Crime Comedy	West German/Italian co-production
Fantômas	Fantomas André Hunebelle	Jean Marais Mylène Demongeot		French/Italian co-production	
A Fistful of Dollars	Per un pugno di dollari	Sergio Leone	Clint Eastwood, Gian Maria Volonté, Marianne Koch	Western	Italian-Spanish-West German co-production
Full Hearts and Empty Pockets	...e la donna creò l'uomo	Camillo Mastrocinque	Thomas Fritsch, Alexandra Stewart, Gino Cervi, Senta Berger	comedy	Italian/West German co-production
Gladiators Seven	La rivolta dei sette	Alberto De Martino	Tony Russel Massimo Serato	Sword and Sandal	
The Gospel According to St. Matthew	Il vangelo secondo Matteo	Pier Paolo Pasolini	Enrique Irazoqui	religion	Venice Award. 3 Academy Award nominations
Grand Canyon Massacre	Massacro al Grande Canyon	Albert Band, Sergio Corbucci	James Mitchum, Milla Sannoner, George Ardisson	spaghetti western	
Greed in the Sun	Cent mille dollars au soleil	Henri Verneuil		comedy	
Guns of Nevada	Oeste Nevada Joe	Ignacio F. Iquino	Jorge Martin Adriana Ambesi	Western	
Hercules Against the Moon Men	Maciste e la regina di Samar	Giacomo Gentilomo	Alan Steel, Jany Clair, Anna Maria Polani	sword-and-sandal	
Hercules and the Tyrants of Babylon	Ercole contro i tiranni di Babilonia	Domenico Paolella	Sword and Sandal		
Hercules the Invincible	Ercole l'invincibile	Alvaro Mancori, Lewis Mann		sword-and-sandal	
High Infidelity	Alta infedeltà	Mario Monicelli, Elio Petri, Franco Rossi, Luciano Salce		comedy	
The Hyena of London	La jena di Londra	Luigi Mangini	Giotto Tempestini, Patrizia Del Frae, Tony Kendall	—N/a	
Kidnapped to Mystery Island	I misteri della giungla nera	Luigi Capuano	Guy Madison, Ingeborg Schöner	Adventure	Co-production with West Germany
The Kinky Darlings	Per una valigia piena di donne	Renzo Russo	Elio Crovetto Angela Guy		
The Last Gun	Jim il primo	Sergio Bergonzelli	Cameron Mitchell, Carl Möhner	Western	
The Last Man on Earth	L'ultimo uomo della Terra	Vincent Price		science fiction	
Last of the Renegades	Giorni di fuoco	Harald Reinl		Western	
Last Plane to Baalbeck	F.B.I. operazione Baalbeck	Marcello Giannini	Jacques Sernas Rossana Podestà George Sanders	Eurospy	
The Lion of Thebes	Leone di Tebe	Giorgio Ferroni	Mark Forest Yvonne Furneaux	Sword and sandal	
The Long Hair of Death	I lunghi capelli della morte	Antonio Margheriti	Barbara Steele	Horror	
Love Meetings	Comizi d'amore	Pier Paolo Pasolini	Alberto Moravia	documentary	Pasolini interviews Italian people, known and unknown, about love and sex
The Magnificent Cuckold	Il magnifico cornuto	Antonio Pietrangeli			
The Magnificent Gladiator	Il magnifico gladiatore	Alfonso Brescia	Mark Forest Marilù Tolo	Sword and Sandal	
Male Companion	Un monsieur de compagnie	Philippe de Broca			
Marriage Italian-Style	Matrimonio all'italiana	Vittorio De Sica	Sophia Loren, Marcello Mastroianni		Nominated for 2 Academy Award, entered into the 4th Moscow International Film Festival
Mission to Hell	La sfida viene da Bangkok	Gianfranco Parolini	Paul Hubschmid Marianne Hold Brad Harris	Eurospy	Italian/West German/French co-production
Mission to Venice	Agent spécial à Venise	André Versini	Sean Flynn Madeleine RobinsonKarin Baal	Eurospy	
Monsieur	Intrigo a Parigi		Jean-Paul Le Chanois	Jean Gabin Liselotte Pulver Mireille Darc	Italian/French/West German co-production
Mystery of the Red Jungle	Da 077: criminali ad Hong Kong,	Helmut Ashley	Maria Perschy Dietmar Schönherr Brad Harris	Adventure	Italian/West German co-production
None But the Lonely Spy	F.B.I. chiama Istanbul	Emimmo Salvi	Ken Clark Bella Cortez	Eurospy	
Oh! Those Most Secret Agents	002 agenti segretissimi		Franco and Ciccio	Eurospy comedy	
Old Shatterhand	Battaglia di Fort Apache	Hugo Fregonese			
Pirates of Malaysia	I pirati della Malesia	Umberto Lenzi	Steve Reeves, Jacqueline Sassard, Andrea Bosic	—N/a	Italian-French-Spanish co-production
The Pirates of the Mississippi	Die Flußpiraten vom Mississippi	Jürgen Roland	Hansjörg Felmy Brad Harris	Western \\ West German/Italian co-production	
Red Desert	Il deserto rosso	Michelangelo Antonioni	Monica Vitti, Richard Harris	drama	Golden Lion winner. Antonioni's first color film
Revolt of the Praetorians	La rivolta dei pretoriani	Alfonso Brescia	Richard Harrisono Moira Orfei	Sword and Sandal	
The Road to Fort Alamo	La strada per Forte Alamo	Mario Bava	Ken Clark Jany Clair		Western
Rome Against Rome	Roma contro Roma	Giuseppe Vari	John Drew Barrymore, Susy Andersen, Ettore Manni	—N/a	
Sandokan Against the Leopard of Sarawak	Sandokan contro il leopardo di Sarawak	Luigi Capuano	Ray Danton, Guy Madison, Franca Bettoia	Adventure	
Sandokan to the Rescue	Sandokan alla riscossa	Luigi Capuano	Ray Danton, Guy Madison, Franca Bettoia	Adventure	
Saul and David	Saul e David	Marcello Baldi	Norman Wooland gianni Garko	Biblical	
The Secret of the Chinese Carnation	Il segreto del garofano cinese	Rudolf Zehetgruber	Paul Dahlke, Olga Schoberová, Dietmar Schönherr	Thriller	Co-production with France and West Germany
Secret of the Sphinx	La sfinge sorride prima di morire - Stop Londra	Duccio Tessari	Tony Russel, Salah Zulfikar, Maria Perschy, Ivan Desny	thriller	Co-production with USA and West Germany
Seven Slaves Against the World	Gli schiavi più forti del mondo	Michele Lupo		Roger Browne Gordon Mitchell	Sword and Sandal
Temple of the White Elephant	Sandok, il Maciste della giungla	Umberto Lenzi	Sean Flynn Marie Versini		
Terror in the Crypt	La cripta e l'incubo	Camillo Mastrocinque	Christopher Lee, Adriana Ambasi	Horror	Italian-Spanish co-production
Seduced and Abandoned	Sedotta e abbandonata	Pietro Germi	Stefania Sandrelli, Saro Urzì, Leopoldo Trieste	comedy (commedia all'italiana)	Cannes Award for Best actor (Urzì)
Shadow of Evil	Banco à Bangkok pour OSS 117	André Hunebelle	Kerwin Mathews	OSS 117 Eurospy	French/Italian co-production
Shivers in Summer	Frenesia dell'estate	Luigi Zampa		comedy	
The Spy	Spionaggio a Gibilterra	Pierre Gaspard-Huit		thriller	
That Man from Rio	L'homme de Rio	Philippe de Broca		adventure	French/Italian co-production
Three for a Robbery	Tre per una rapina	Gianni Bongioanni	Christian Doermer, Werner Peters, Barbara Steele	Crime	Co-production with Spain and West Germany
Three Nights of Love	Tre notti d'amore	Renato Castellani, Luigi Comencini, Franco Rossi		drama	
Time of Indifference	Gli indifferenti	Francesco Maselli	Claudia Cardinale, Rod Steiger, Shelley Winters, Paulette Goddard, Tomas Milian	drama	Based on an Alberto Moravia novel
The Train	Il treno	John Frankenheimer		war	
The Two Gladiators	I due gladiatori	Mario Caiano	Richard Harrison Moira Orfei	Sword and Sandal	
Two Mafiamen in the Far West	Due mafiosi nel Far West	Giorgio Simonelli	Franco and Ciccio	comedy Western	
The Vampire of the Opera	Il mostro dell'opera	Renato Polselli	Marco Mariani, Giuseppe Addobbati, Barbara Hawards	—N/a	
The Visit	La vendetta della signora	Bernhard Wicki			
Weekend at Dunkirk	Week-end à Zuydcoote	Henri Verneuil		War movie	French/Italian co-production
Weeping for a Bandit	I cavalieri della vendetta	Carlos Saura		drama	
White Voices	Le voci bianche	Pasquale Festa Campanile		comedy	
World Without Sun	Il mondo senza sole	Jacques-Yves Cousteau		documentary	
	24 ore di terrore				
	Acciaio sul mare				
	Adolescenti al sole				
	Agent secret FX 18				
	Aimez-vous les femmes?				
	Al nostro sonno inquieto				
	Alla moda				
	Amore facile				
	Amore in quattro dimensioni				
	Amore mio				
	Antes llega la muerte				
	Antonello capobrigante calabrese				
	Appuntamento a Dallas				
	Bagnolo - Dorf zwischen schwarz und rot				
	Bene mio core mio				
	Bianco, rosso, giallo, rosa				
	Biblioteca di Studio Uno: Al Grand Hotel				
	Biblioteca di Studio Uno: I tre moschettieri				
	Biblioteca di Studio Uno: Il conte di Montecristo				
	Biblioteca di Studio Uno: Il dottor Jeckill e mister Hide				
	Biblioteca di Studio Uno: Il fornaretto di Venezia				
	Biblioteca di Studio Uno: La primula rossa				
	Biblioteca di Studio Uno: La storia di Rossella O'Hara				
	Biblioteca di Studio Uno: Odissea				
	Ça ira (Il fiume della rivolta)				
	Canzoni bulli e pupe				
	Carosello di notte				
	Cavalca e uccidi				
	Che fine ha fatto Totò baby?				
	Cherchez l'idole				
	Cleopazza				
	Controsesso				
	Coplan prend des risques				
	Coriolano: eroe senza patria				
	Così è (se vi pare)				
	Cover Girls (1964 film)				
	Crimine a due				
	Crucero de verano				
	Cuatro balazos				
	Cyrano et d'Artagnan				
	Delitto allo specchio				
	Der Schut				
	Des frissons partout				
	Des pissenlits par la racine				
	Desideri d'estate				
	Donde tú estés				
	Du grabuge chez les veuves				
	Due mattacchioni al Moulin Rouge				
	Ecco il finimondo				
	El hombre de la diligencia				
	Échappement libre				
	Ercole contro i figli del sole				
	Ercole contro Roma				
	Ercole, Sansone, Maciste e Ursus gli invincibili				
	Europa: operazione streep-tease				
	Extraconiugale				
	Follie d'Europa				
	Fontana di Trevi				
	Genoveffa di Brabante				
	Giorni di furore				
	Giulietta e Romeo	Riccardo Freda			
	Gli eroi di ieri, oggi, domani				
	Gli invincibili dieci gladiatori				
	Gli invincibili fratelli Maciste				
	Gli invincibili sette				
	Gli invincibili tre				
	Golia alla conquista di Bagdad				
	Golia e il cavaliere mascherato				
	Hardi Pardaillan!	Bernard Borderie		comedy	
	I cento cavalieri				
	I due evasi di Sing Sing				
	I due mafiosi				
	I due pericoli pubblici				
	I due violenti				
	I figli di Olimpia				
	I gemelli del Texas				
	I giganti di Roma				
	I grandi camaleonti				
	I magnifici brutos del West				
	I malamondo				
	I maniaci				
	I marziani hanno dodici mani				
	I polli di Enrico IV				
	I predoni della steppa				
	I promessi sposi				
	I ragazzi dell'hully-gully				
	I rusteghi				
	I tre sergenti del Bengala				
	Ignazio e Kresy, i magnifici avventurieri				
	Il chirurgo opera				
	Il colosso di Roma				
	Il disco volante				
	Il dominatore del deserto				
	Il figlio di Cleopatra				
	Il giornalino di Gian Burrasca				
	Il ladro di Damasco				
	Il mostro dell'opera				
	Il pelo nel mondo				
	Il piacere e il mistero				
	Il piave mormorò				
	Il ponte dei sospiri				
	Il ribelle di Castelmonte				
	Il signor Rossi al mare				
	Il silenzio				
	Il sindaco del Rione Sanità				
	Il sole che muore				
	Il terrore dei mantelli rossi				
	Il tramontana				
	Il treno del sabato				
	Il trionfo dei dieci gladiatori				
	Il trionfo di Ercole				
	Il vendicatore mascherato				
	Il vuoto				
	In ginocchio da te				
	Indios a Nord-Ovest				
	Insistiamo				
	Intrigo a Los Angeles				
	Italia di notte n. 1				
	Italiani come noi				
	Jean-Marc ou La vie conjugale				
	Kindar l'invulnerabile				
	L'ajo nell'imbarazzo				
	L'amore primitivo				
	L'appartement des filles				
	L'autre femme				
	L'avventura dei Monti Pallidi				
	L'età del ferro				
	L'idea fissa				
	L'insoumis				
	L'intrigo				
	L'isola dei ragazzi meravigliosi				
	L'ultima carica				
	L'ultimo gladiatore				
	L'ultimo sole				
	L'uomo che bruciò il suo cadavere				
	L'uomo della valle maledetta				
	L'uomo mascherato contro i pirati				
	La bonne soupe				
	La chance et l'amour				
	La chasse à l'homme				
	La chica del trébol				
	La coda del diavolo				
	La Costanza della ragione				
	La difficulté d'être infidèle				
	La donna è una cosa meravigliosa				
The Adolescents	Le adolescenti				
	La fuga				
	La gazza ladra				
	La guerra dei topless				
	La mia signora				
	La mort d'un tueur				
	La porta				
	La porta di San Pietro di Giacomo Manzù				
	La ragazza in prestito				
	La rivolta dei barbari				
	La scoperta dell'America				
	La sfinge sorride prima di morire - stop - Londra				
	La tulipe noire				
	La valle dell'eco tonante				
	La vedovella				
	La vendetta dei gladiatori				
	La vita agra	Carlo Lizzani	Ugo Tognazzi, Giovanna Ralli, Enzo Jannacci	Comedy	Based on Luciano Bianciardi's novel of the same name
	Laissez tirer les tireurs				
	Le belle famiglie	Ugo Gregoretti		comedy	
	Le conseguenze				
	Le fils de Tarass Boulba				
	Le gendarme de St. Tropez	Jean Girault		comedy	
	Le grain de sable				
	Le gros coup				
	Le monocle rit jaune				
	Le mura di Sana				
	Le ore nude				
	Le pistole non discutono				
	Le repas des fauves				
	Le schiave esistono ancora				
	Le sette vipere: Il marito latino				
	Le tardone				
	Les amoureux du France				
	Les baisers				
	Les Barbouzes				
	Les Parias de la gloire				
	Les plus belles escroqueries du monde				
	Les yeux cernés				
	Liolà				
	Los dinamiteros				
	Maciste alla corte dello zar				
	Maciste nell'inferno di Gengis Khan				
	Maciste nelle miniere di re Salomone				
	Maciste, gladiatore di Sparta				
	Massacre at Marble City				
	Mastro Don Gesualdo				
	Mata Hari, agent H21				
	Michelangiolo				
	Michelino Cucchiarella				
	Mille e una donna				
	Mille franchi di ricompensa				
	Mondo balordo				
	Napoleone a Firenze				
	Notte su una minoranza				
	Nudi per vivere				
	Okay sceriffo				
	Patate				
	Per un dollaro a Tucson si muore				
	Relaxe-toi chérie				
	Ritratto del padre				
	Rivoluzione a Cuba				
	Roma del Belli				
	Scandali nudi				
	Scherzoso ma non troppo				
	Se permettete parliamo di donne				
	Sedotti e bidonati				
	Senza sole nè luna				
	Sette a Tebe				
	Sette contro la morte				
	Sinbad contro i sette saraceni				
	Squillo				
	Super rapina a Milano				
	Tarzak contro gli uomini leopardo				
	Ti-Koyo e il suo pescecane				
	Totò contro il pirata nero				
	Totò d'Arabia				
	Un commerce tranquille				
	Un giorno ai giardini pubblici				
	Un Momento muy largo				
	Un mostro e mezzo				
	Una lacrima sul viso				
	Una sporca faccenda				
	Una sporca guerra				
	Una storia di notte				
	Uomini della montagna				
	Ursus, il terrore dei kirghisi				
	Veneri proibite				
	Via Veneto				
	Vita di Michelangelo				
	Zorikan lo sterminatore				

== See also ==
- 1964 in film
- 1964 in Italian television
