= List of Spanish films of 1968 =

A list of films produced in Spain in 1968 (see 1968 in film).

== 1968 ==
Title	Director	Cast	Genre	Notes
1968
El turismo es un gran invento	Pedro Lazaga	Paco Martínez Soria, José Luis López Vázquez	Comedy	
Agonizando en el crimen				
La Alpujarra, un mundo quieto				
La amante estelar	Antonio de Lara	Elena Arnao, Claudia Cardinale, Pedro Costa	Short	
Ammazzali tutti e torna solo				
Anche nel west c'era una volta Dio				
The Blood of Fu Manchu	Jess Franco	Christopher Lee, Richard Greene		
Las Noches del Hombre Lobo	René Govar	Paul Naschy	Horror	
Pistol for a Hundred Coffins	Umberto Lenzi	Peter Lee Lawrence, John Ireland	Spaghetti Western	
Satanik	Piero Vivarelli	Magda Konopka, Julio Peña, Umberto Raho		Italian–Spanish co-production
Superargo and the Faceless Giants	Paolo Bianchini	Giovanni Cianfriglia, Guy Madison, Luisa Baratto	Science fiction	Italian–Spanish co-production
