= Massacre Mania =

- Directed by: Paolo Bianchini
- Screenplay by: Paolo Bianchini; Max Caret
- Story by: Paolo Bianchini; Max Caret
- Produced by: Gabriele Crisanti
- Starring: Robert Woods; Rada Rassimov; Giovanni Cianfriglia; Fernando Sancho
- Cinematography: Erico Menczer
- Edited by: Otello Colangeli
- Music by: Carlo Savina
- Production company: Cinecris
- Release date: 1967 (Italy)
- Running time: 90 minutes
- Country: Italy

Massacre Mania (Italian: Hipnos follia di massacro) is an Italian 1967 science fiction film written and directed by Paolo Bianchini.

== Cast ==
- Robert Woods as Henry Spengler
- Rada Rassimov as Nicole Bouvier
- Ken Wood as Inspector Griffith
- Fernando Sancho as Professor Kenitz
- Lino Coletta as Maurice
- Piero Gerlini as The Policeman
- Nino Vingelli

== Production ==
Massacre Mania was the third and final film directed by Paolo Bianchini for producer Gabriele Crisanti, following The Devil's Man and Superargo and the Faceless Giants. The film was shot in eight weeks in and around Rome between February and March 1967.

Among the cast was Robert Woods. Woods described the script as improvized, stating that "these were nearly always collaborative efforts (where almost everyone involved had input)." Woods spoke positively about working on the film, specifically on how it was a departure from the Westerns and that he "loved the comic book implications" of Massacre Mania.

== Style ==
In his book about Italian films inspired by comic books and their conventions, Roberto Curti described the film as "often labelled as a spy flick, Massacre Mania is actually a lot closer to the superhero films of the era, of which it represents a darker version, and very Italian too." Curti felt the film was a "strange mixture of science fiction, thriller and comic-book style adventure"

== Release and reception ==
Massacre Mania was submitted to the Italian board of censors in October 1967, one month after Superargo and the Faceless Giants, but was eventually released earlier than that film. The Italian title for the film is Hipnos follia di massacro and is sometimes misspelled as Hypnos in reference books. Producer Gabriele Crisanti described the film's release as "a flop", acknowledging that he "made the mistake of giving it to a distributor-Vecchioni, the owner of United International Films-who went bankrupt before the film was released."

Director Paolo Bianchini did not have a high opinion of the film, stating that he had been "invited to conventions and film schools concerning [Massacre Mania]. But every time I watch it again, it's such a terrible thing. Perhaps people notice that there's a certain high craft about these pics, as they were literally made out of nothing."

== See also ==
- List of Italian films of 1967
- List of science fiction films of the 1960s
