= 1964 in Italian television =

This is a list of Italian television related events from 1964.

== Events ==
- January 4–6 - RAI is the official television for the pastoral visit of Paul VI to the Holy Land. For the first time in history, the journey of a pope is documented on video. It is the biggest RAI production effort since the Rome Olympics. A team of 200 people and a convoy of vehicles over two kilometers long are sent to Palestine.
- January 6 - the Sicilian team wins Gran Premio (the 1963 edition of Canzonissima).
- February 1 - Gigliola Cinquetti and Patricia Carli win the Sanremo Festival with Non ho l’età. The final evening of the contest, hosted by Mike Bongiorno, is the most seen TV show of the year, with 14 million viewers.
- March 21 - Italy wins the 9th Eurovision Song Contest in Copenhagen, Denmark. The winning song is "Non ho l'età", performed by Gigliola Cinquetti.
- June 7 - Pietro Quaroni, former Italian ambassador in Moscow and Paris, is appointed president of Rai; the writer Giorgio Bassani and the journalist Italo De Feo are vice-presidents.
- October 24: at the Casino de la Vallée, in Saint-Vincent, Los Marcellos Ferial win the first edition of Un disco per l’estate, with Sei diventate nera

== Debuts ==
=== Serials ===
- Le inchieste del commissario Maigret (The inquiries of the superintendent Maigret) – by Mario Landi, from the George Simenon’s novels, with Gino Cervi, Andreina Pagnani and Mario Maranzana, written by Diego Fabbri; 4 seasons.

=== Variety ===
- Festival delle rose (Roses’ festival) and Un disco per l’estate (A record for the summer): music festivals, with respectively 4 and 32 editions.
- Teatro 10 – variety hosted by Lelio Luttazzi and, after a seven-year break, by Alberto Lupo; 3 seasons.
- Telecruciverba (TV crossword) – quiz for kids, hosted by Pippo Baudo; 2 seasons.
- Za-bum – directed by Mario Mattoli, with a very rich cast (Walter Chiari, Tony Renis, Elio Pandolfi, Carlo Mazzarella, and many others); 2 seasons. The title homages a popular revue of the Thirties, directed by Mattoli himself.

=== News and educational ===
- Cordialmente (Cordiallly) – magazine respnsing to the letters of the TV viewiers, hosted by Enza Sampò and care of Alfonso Gatto; 5 seasons.

== Television shows ==
=== Drama ===
- Antonello capobrigante calabrese (Antonello, the Calabrian chieftain) – by Ottavio Spadaro, with Alberto Lupo and Aldo Giuffrè, from the Vincenzo Padula's play, set in Calabria under the Bourbon’s rule.
- Shakespeare secondo Gassmann – Vittorio Gassmann’s recital of Shakespearean monologues, paying homage to the fourth centenary of the playwright .
- Alle sei, Chaussée d’Antin – pochade by Roger Ferdinand, directed by Davide Montemurri, with Mario Scaccia.

=== Miniseries ===
- I grandi camaleonti (The great chameleons) – serial by Edmo Fenoglio, script by Federico Zardi, with Giancarlo Sbragia (Napoleon), Raoul Grassilli (Fouché), Mario Pisu (Barras), Tino Carraro (Talleyrand) and Valentina Cortese (Joséphine); 6 episodes. Follow-up to I giacobini, by the same author, it tells the history of the French Directory and of its politicians (the chameleons) who betrayed for opportunism their revolutionary past.
- I miserabili (Les miserables) – by Sandro Bolchi, for the centenary of the Victor Hugo’s novel, with Gastone Moschin (Jean Valjean), Tino Carraro (Javert) and Giulia Lazzarini (Fantine and Cosette ); it's the longest (10 episodes) and most expensive (100 million liras) fiction realized by RAI until then.
- La cittadella (The citadel) by Anton Giulio Majano, from the Archibald Cronin’s novel, with Alberto Lupo, Anna Maria Guarnieri and Eleonora Rossi Drago; in 7 episodes. It's perhaps the most beloved by public among the RAI black and white serials and makes a star of Alberto Lupo, until then a mid-level actor.
- Vita di Michelangelo (Life of Michelangelo) – by Silverio Blasi, with Gian Maria Volonté in the title role; in 3 episodes.
- Mastro Don Gesualdo – from the Giovanni Verga’s novel, by Giacomo Vaccari (dead in a car accident before the airing), with Enrico Maria Salerno, Lydia Alfonsi, Turi Ferro and Sergio Tofano; 6 episodes. It's the first RAI fiction shot on film and the first one aired on RAI 2.

==== For children ====
- Il giornalino di Gian Burrasca (The Johnny Storm's little diary) – by Lina Wertmuller, with Rita Pavone (who, thanks her shortness and small body, plays convincingly the protagonist, a pre-adolescent boy), Ivo Garrani and Arnoldo Foà; in 8 episodes. The Vamba’s novel is adapted in the key of a musical comedy, with the catchy tunes of Nino Rota.
- Le avventure della squadra di stoppa (The adventures of the tow team) – by Alda Grimaldi, from the Emilio De Martino's novel, with Roberto Chevalier and Rodolfo Bianchi; 4 episodes, for children. Two kids, one rich and the other poor, are rivals in a school football tournament.
- Obiettivo luna by Marcella Curti Giardino, with Roberto Chevalier and Loretta Goggi, adapted from English series Target luna; 5 episodes.

=== Variety ===
- Gala TV per il decennale – by Silverio Blasi, a show broadcast on January 3 to celebrate ten years of Italian TV, with the main Italian actors and singers; Mina performs one of her hits, Città vuota, for the first time.
- Specchio segreto (Secret mirror) – candid camera show, directed and interpreted by Nanni Loy, in 7 episodes.
- Napoli contro tutti (Naples against the world) – 1964 edition of Canzonissma, hosted by Nino Taranto, it has the form of a musical competition among Naples and other Italian and European towns.
- Biblioteca di Studio Uno (the Studio Uno's library) – cycle of musical parodies of literature and cinema classics, with the Quartetto Cetra, directed by Antonello Falqui. The music is composed by 400 popular tunes, whose lyrics are humorously adapted to the dramatic plot. It's a successful experiment of “colossal revue”, with lavish scenery, 1500 extras and 160 supporting actors (including several stars of theatre and television).

=== News and educational ===
- Buon compleanno, TV (Happy birthday, TV) - reportage by Ugo Zatterin and celebrating the 10th anniversary of the first official TV broadcasting by RAI.
- Un’ora e ½ con il regista di Otto e ½ (An hour and a half with the 8 ½ director) – reportage by Sergio Zavoli about Federico Fellini.
- La casa in Italia (The house in Italy) – by Liliana Cavani, in 4 episodes. The enquiry, which boldly shows the distortions of the Italian economic miracle, gets both consents and polemics; an interview with a mafia boss involved in the building speculation is censored by RAI.
- Come, quando, perché (How, when, why) - enquiry about the Italian press, by Aldo Falivena and Paolo Cavallina.
- In the land of Don Quixote by Orson Welles.

== Ending this year ==
- L’amico degli animali
- L’amico del giaguaro
- Cantatutto
- Teletris

== Births ==
- 28 June – Sabrina Ferilli, actress
- 6 July – Cristina D'Avena, actress, singer (well known for singing theme songs to famous television anime and cartoons) and television presenter
- 30 November – Fabio Fazio, television presenter

== See also ==
- List of Italian films of 1964
