= Triumph of the Ten Gladiators =

- Directed by: Nick Nostro
- Screenplay by: Sergio Sollima; Nick Nostro
- Story by: Nick Nostro
- Produced by: Amando Morandi
- Starring: Dan Vadis; Helga Liné; Stello Candelli; Gianni Rizzo
- Cinematography: Tino Santoni; Francisco Marin
- Edited by: Enzo Alfonzi
- Music by: Carlo Savina
- Release date: 26 November 1964 (Italy)
- Running time: 106 minutes

Triumph of the Ten Gladiators (Italian: Il trionfo dei dieci gladiatori is a 1964 peplum film written and directed by Nick Nostro and starring Dan Vadis. It is the sequel of Gianfranco Parolini's The Ten Gladiators (Italian: I dieci gladiatori), and was followed by Spartacus and the Ten Gladiators (Italian: Gli invincibili dieci gladiatori).

== Plot ==
When the ten gladiators arrive in Antioch, they are approached by a man disguised as a beggar, who throws a bag of gold at them saying a man has got work for them and they should follow him, not too closely, to the man's house. The owner of the house introduces himself as Publius Quintilius Rufus, proconsul of the emperor in Roman Syria, and offers them a contract to put on a series of spectacles at the court of Queen Moluya of Arbela.

Arbela is now a neutral kingdom between Roman territory and the Parthian Empire, Rome's bitterest enemy. Queen Moluya's prime minister has concluded a pact with the Parthian king to allow his armies to pass across the frontier. One of Publius's men, Centurion Marcus Glaucus, unknown to the Parthians, will accompany them officially as the eleventh gladiator to the capital city so he can find out exactly what the situation there is. The ten gladiators, whose loyalty is without question, accepted the job and agree to leave for Arbela at daybreak. With war inevitable between Rome and Parthia, unbeknown to the ten gladiators, their real mission is to kidnap the ambitious queen, and take her back to Syria as a hostage for Rome.

== Cast ==
- Dan Vadis as Rocca
- Helga Liné as Regina Moluya
- Stelio Candelli as Glauco Marcio
- Gianni Rizzo as Sesto Vetullio
- Halina Zalewska as Myrta
- Enzo Fiermonte as Rizio
- Leontine May as Selima
- Carlo Tamberlani as Publio Rufo
- Ivano Staccioli as Arimandro
- Emilio Messina as Lepto
- Ugo Sasso
- Aldo Canti
- Salvatore Borghese
- Franco Pesce

== Release ==
Triumph of the Ten Gladiators was released in Italy on 26 November 1964.

== Notes ==
=== References ===
- Kinnard, Roy; Crnkovich, Tony (2017). Italian Sword and Sandal Films, 1908-1990. McFarland. ISBN 978-1476662916.
