= Veriano Ginesi =

Italian actor

- Born: 2 March 1907; Tuscania, Kingdom of Italy
- Died: 1 July 1989 (aged 82); Rome, Italy
- Occupation: Actor

Veriano Ginesi (2 March 1907 – 1 July 1989) was an Italian actor.

He is known for playing Barile in La mafia mi fa un baffo (1974), directed by Riccardo Garrone; and playing Angelo banker in Even Angels Eat Beans (1973). He played a fat lady in Fellini's Roma (1972), Bald Onlooker at Tuco's 1st Hanging in The Good, the Bad and the Ugly (1966), and the truck driver in The Crazy Kids of the War (1967).

He also appeared in Cleopatra's Daughter (1960), Goliath and the Sins of Babylon (1963) as soldier, Hercules vs. Moloch (1963) as gladiator.

== Filmography ==
- Bicycle Thieves (1948) as Man in the Crowd (uncredited)
- An American in Rome (1954) as Soldato tedesco (uncredited)
- The Love Specialist (1957) as Supporter of the Chiocciola Contrada (uncredited)
- Aphrodite, Goddess of Love (1958) as Guard (uncredited)
- The Pirate of the Black Hawk (1958) as Turturer (uncredited)
- Everyone's in Love (1959) as Man attending the political Meeting (uncredited)
- Son of the Red Corsair (1959) as Pirate
- Goliath and the Barbarians (1959) as Barbarian Fighter
- The Pirate and the Slave Girl (1959) as Man into the Tavern (uncredited)
- La Dolce Vita [The Sweet Life] (1960) as Man in the Crowd at the Miracle (uncredited)
- Siege of Syracuse (1960) as Uomo al taverna (uncredited)
- Some Like It Cold (1960) as German Soldier (uncredited)
- Morgan, the Pirate (1960) as Pirate (uncredited)
- Pirates of the Coast (1960) as Renegate's Ship Soldier (uncredited)
- Cleopatra's Daughter (1960) (uncredited)
- Constantine and the Cross (1961) as Torturer (uncredited)
- The Last of the Vikings (1961) as Viking (uncredited)
- Ursus and the Tartar Princess (1961) as Leader of Horses (uncredited)
- Mina... fuori la guardia (1961) as Postman (uncredited)
- Diabolical Antonio (1962) as Nando 'Bellicapelli' (uncredited)
- The Witch's Curse (1962) (uncredited)
- 2 samurai per 100 geishe (1962)
- Gladiator of Rome (1962) (uncredited)
- Goliath and the Sins of Babylon (1963) as Soldier (uncredited)
- Monstruos de hoy (1963) as Man on the Car (segment "Presa dalla Vita") (uncredited)
- The Ten Gladiators (1963) as Geriel, the Ship's Drummer (uncredited)
- Hercules vs. Moloch (1963) as Gladiator
- Two Mafiamen (1964) as Hitman
- Totó contra el pirata negro (1964) (uncredited)
- Two Gangsters in the Wild West (1964) as Un detenuto (uncredited)
- La venganza de Sandokan (1964) as Executor (uncredited)
- Treasure of the Petrified Forest (1965) (uncredited)
- The Agony and the Ecstasy (1965) as Tavern Customer (uncredited)
- War Italian Style (1965) as Stage Worker (uncredited)
- Veneri al sole (1965) as Trainer of Andreucci (uncredited)
- Me, Me, Me... and the Others (1966) as Fat Passenger (uncredited)
- Dr. Goldfoot and the Girl Bombs (1966) as Bald Goldfoot Henchman (uncredited)
- Superargo Versus Diabolicus (1966) as Henchman in Ring (uncredited)
- The Good, the Bad and the Ugly (1966) as Bald Onlooker at Tuco's 1st Hanging (uncredited)
- The Witches (1967) as Bald admirerer at stadium (segment "Sera come le altre, Una") (uncredited)
- La superjuerga (1967) as Truck Driver (uncredited)
- Execution (1968) as Townsman during Fire (uncredited)
- Abrázame y sáciame de besos (1968) as Ex pugile uomo pulizie (uncredited)
- The Nephews of Zorro (1968) as Hangman
- The Two Crusaders (1968) as Bald Outlaw (uncredited)
- Rabbit in the Pit (1969)
- Fellini Satyricon (1969) as Guest of Trimalcione (uncredited)
- Satiricosissimo (1970) as Executioner (uncredited)
- Brancaleone at the Crusades (1970) as Follower of Zenone (uncredited)
- Tre nel mille (1971)
- Blackie the Pirate (1971) as Pirate (uncredited)
- Confessions of a Police Captain (1971) as Prisoner (uncredited)
- El retorno del gladiator invencible (1971) as Guard (uncredited)
- Man of the Year (1971) as Man with Three Ears (uncredited)
- La corta noche de las muñecas de cristal (1971) as Dead Girl's Father (uncredited)
- En nombre del pueblo italiano (1971) as Handyman in Law Courts (uncredited)
- Roma (1972) as Audience Member at Teatrino (uncredited)
- Sexy Sinners (1972) as Executioner (uncredited)
- The Black Hand (1973) as Don Gaetano Henchman (uncredited)
- Even Angels Eat Beans (1973) as Angelo's Banker (uncredited)
- Man Called Invincible (1973) (uncredited)
- The Sensual Man (1973) as Friend of Motorcyclist (uncredited)
- Here We Go Again, Eh Providence? (1973) as Hospice Patient (uncredited)
- Amarcord (1973) as Lifeguard (uncredited)
- Shanghai Joe (1973) as Blacksmith (uncredited)
- La mafia mi fa un baffo (1974) as 'Barile'
- De tresillo no hay más que uno (1974) as Sailor (uncredited)
- El contragolpe (1974) as Man in Pub (uncredited)
- Paolo the Cold (1974) as Bald Friar (uncredited)
- Seven Beauties (1975) as Smoking Patient in Aversa (uncredited)
- Corazón de perro (1976)
- Con Artists (1976) as Prison Cook (uncredited)
- Kakkientruppen (1977) as Head of 'panzer' soldiers (uncredited)
- Calígula (1979) as Wedding Guest (uncredited)
- Assassination on the Tiber (1979) as Rincojo (uncredited)
- Libidomania (1979) as Singapore Brothel Client (uncredited) (final film role)

== Bibliography ==
- Kinnard, Roy; Crnkovich, Tony (28 February 2017). Italian Sword and Sandal Films, 1908-1990. McFarland Publishing. p. 256. ISBN 9781476627045.
