= Goliath and the Dragon =

- Directed by: Vittorio Cottafavi
- Screenplay by: Marcello Baldi; Duccio Tessari; Mario Ferrari; Nicolo Ferrari; Fabio Carpi; Ennio De Concini; Franco Rossetti
- Story by: Marcello Baldi; Nicolo Ferrari
- Produced by: Gianni Fuchs; Achille Piazzi
- Starring: Mark Forest; Broderick Crawford; Gaby André; Renato Terra
- Cinematography: Mario Montuori
- Music by: Alexandre Derevitsky
- Production companies: Achille Piazzi Produzioni Cinematografica; Produzione Gianni Guchs; Comptoir Francais du Film Production (CFFP)
- Distributed by: American International Pictures
- Release date: 12 August 1960 (Italy)
- Countries: Italy; France

Goliath and the Dragon (Italian: La vendetta di Ercole, lit. 'Revenge of Hercules') is a 1960 sword-and-sandal film directed by Vittorio Cottafavi and starring Mark Forest and Broderick Crawford.

The name of the main character was changed from Hercules to Emilius (known in the film as Goliath) for release in North America by American International Pictures to sell it as a sequel to their earlier Goliath and the Barbarians (1959). American International Pictures had announced plans to create a sequel to Goliath and the Barbarians called Goliath and the Dragon based on a script by Lou Rusoff for star Debra Paget, but the project fell through, so they bought the rights to an already-made Italian film called Revenge of Hercules and retitled it Goliath and the Dragon. American International Pictures also added a Wah Ming Chang stop-motion animation sequence inserting a dragon sub-plot into the story. The dragon sequence is only in the Americanized English-dubbed print, not in the original Italian version.

== Plot ==
The film begins with Hercules/Goliath entering the underworld and defeating several monsters including Cerberus to retrieve the blood diamond of the goddess of vengeance. It is later revealed that king Eurystheus has sent Hercules on this task to ensure his death to gain allies who after Hercules' death will join the king in an attack on Thebes. The episode is loosely based on the twelfth of the Labours of Hercules.

Hercules returns to his wife Deianira to find that his teenaged son (his brother in the American version) Hyllus is in love with Thea the daughter of a king that Hercules believes murdered his family. The enraged Hercules refuses to let Hyllus have anything to do with Thea. The scheming Eurystheus has convinced Hyllus that Thea is really in love with Hercules rather than him and concocts a plan where a jealous Hyllus will murder his own brother. A slave girl Alcinoe gives Hyllus a poison to give to Hercules that she says is merely a potion to have Hercules fall out of love with Thea. Eurystheus himself wishes to marry Thea and install her as his queen.

The plan is aborted through a sympathetic goddess of the Wind who relays Thea's warning. Hyllus attempts to rescue Thea but is captured. When Hercules rides to rescue Hyllus he saves the life of Alcinoe who is menaced by a bear. Ilus is to be executed with others in a public display by being crushed by an elephant in a crowded arena. Hercules rescues him.

On their return home the two are given a prophecy that Hyllus will become a king but at the cost of the life of the woman who loves Hercules. Hercules destroys his home and leaves with his family to try and avert the prophecy. Deianira offers her life to the gods in order to fulfil the prophecy for Hyllus. She is carried off by a centaur corresponding with Nessus who Hercules mortally wounds.

The centaur is able to bring his captive Deianira to his friend Eurystheus who intends firstly to let her be killed by his dragon (in the English-dubbed version of the film only), then to act as a hostage against the vengeance of Hercules.

== Cast ==
- Mark Forest – Hercules/Goliath
- Broderick Crawford – King Eurystheus
- Sandro Moretti – Hyllus
- Gaby André – Ismene
- Philippe Hersent – Androclo
- Leonora Ruffo – Deianira
- Giancarlo Sbragia – Tindaro
- Wandisa Guida – Alcinoe
- Federica Ranchi – Thea
- Carla Calò – Sibyl
- Ugo Sasso – Timocleo
- Claudio Undari – Centaur
- Salvatore Furnari – Midget

== Release ==
Goliath and the Dragon was released in Italy on 12 August 1960 where it was released as La vendetta di Ercole. It was released in the United States as Goliath and the Dragon in November 1960. The American version of the film was edited by Salvatore Billitteri and Maurizio Lucidi and had new music by Les Baxter.

== Reception ==
The film is listed in Golden Raspberry Award founder John Wilson's book The Official Razzie Movie Guide as one of the 100 Most Enjoyably Bad Movies Ever Made.

== See also ==
- List of films featuring Hercules
