= Dan Vadis =

American actor (1938–1987)

Constantine Dan Vafiadis
- Born: January 3, 1938; Shanghai, China
- Died: June 11, 1987 (aged 49); Lancaster, California, U.S.
- Occupation: Actor
- Years active: 1948–1987
- Children: 1

Dan Vadis (born Constantine Daniel Vafiadis, January 3, 1938 – June 11, 1987) was a Chinese-born American actor, of Greek descent, famous for his lead roles in many Italian films made in the 1960s.

== Biography ==
Vadis was of Greek descent, with lineage tracing back to the island of Chios in the Aegean Sea. This former U.S. Navy sailor and bodybuilder was a member of the Mae West "Muscleman Revue" in the late 1950s. He was a brawny, handsome durable 6'4" man with curly brown hair, bluish green eyes and an affable demeanor. He was probably one of the most memorable actors in the Roman epic movies created in the 1960s and early '70s to portray Hercules - the most famous Greek warrior.

He was also one of many bodybuilders to take a stab at fame and fortune with the Italian peplum films of the 1960s. Noted film critic Raymond Durgnat famously asked if he was "the brother of Quo?".

His most notable role was The Triumph of Hercules (1964), in which he portrayed Hercules battling golden giants and trying to save his princess love from her evil relative. The film was quickly followed by Hercules the Invincible retitled Son of Hercules in the Land of Darkness, in The Sons of Hercules television package by Embassy Pictures. What made Vadis stand out from other athletes and bodybuilders in these films was the obvious speed, dexterity, agility and all around durability that he brought to his films, bringing much needed energy to what otherwise may have been average fight scenes.

After the sword and sandal films faded he moved into Spaghetti Westerns, then became a recurring face in Clint Eastwood movies such as High Plains Drifter, The Gauntlet, Every Which Way but Loose, Any Which Way You Can and Bronco Billy.

Vadis died in Lancaster, California on 11 June 1987, at the age of 49. His body was found in a car in the desert, and his death was declared an accidental drug overdose with acute ethanol and heroin-morphine intoxication. He was survived by his wife, Sharon Jessup, and his son, Nick.

== Partial filmography ==
- Colossus of the Arena (1962) - Sidon
- The Rebel Gladiators (1962) - Ursus
- The Pirates of the Mississippi (1963) - Blackfoot
- The Ten Gladiators (1963) - Roccia
- Hercules the Invincible (1964) - Ercole / Hercules
- Zorikan lo sterminatore (1964) - Zorikan
- The Triumph of Hercules (1964) - Ercole / Hercules
- Triumph of the Ten Gladiators (1964) - Roccia
- Spartacus and the Ten Gladiators (1964) - Roccia
- The Sucker (1965) - (uncredited)
- Deguejo (1966) - Ramon
- Kommissar X – Drei gelbe Katzen (1966) - King
- For a Few Extra Dollars (1966) - Nelson Riggs
- The Stranger Returns (1967) - En Plein
- The Scalphunters (1968) - Yuma
- Dio perdoni la mia pistola (1969) - Martin
- High Plains Drifter (1973) - Dan Carlin, outlaw
- Cahill U.S. Marshal (1973) - Brownie
- The White Buffalo (1977) - Tall Man (uncredited)
- The Gauntlet (1977) - Biker
- Every Which Way but Loose (1978) - Frank (Black Widow)
- Bronco Billy (1980) - Chief Big Eagle
- Any Which Way You Can (1980) - Frank (Black Widow)
- I sette magnifici gladiatori (1982) - Nicerote (final film role)
