= A Man Called Sledge =

1970 film by Vic Morrow, Giorgio Gentili

- US film poster
- Directed by: Vic Morrow
- Written by: Vic Morrow; Frank Kowalski
- Produced by: Dino De Laurentiis
- Starring: James Garner; Laura Antonelli; Dennis Weaver; Claude Akins; John Marley
- Cinematography: Luigi Kuveiller
- Edited by: Renzo Lucidi
- Music by: Gianni Ferrio
- Production company: Dino de Laurentiis Cinematografica
- Distributed by: Columbia Pictures
- Release date: 9 June 1970
- Running time: 93 minutes
- Country: Italy
- Language: English

A Man Called Sledge is a 1970 Italian Spaghetti Western film starring James Garner in an extremely offbeat role as a grimly hardened thief, and featuring Dennis Weaver, Claude Akins and Wayde Preston. The film was written by Vic Morrow and Frank Kowalski, and directed by Morrow in Techniscope.

Garner wrote in his memoirs that this movie was "one of the few times I've played a heavy and one of the last. I wish I could remember why I let Dino de Laurentiis talk me into this turkey. The poster says 'Not suitable for children.' It should say 'not suitable for consumption.'"

== Plot ==
Luther Sledge, a wanted outlaw, is visiting his prostitute girlfriend, Ria, when one of his gang is shot over a poker game. Sledge kills the murderers, and is recognized by an old man, who follows him. Sledge waylays the old man, who then relates a tale of a periodic gold shipment that is heavily guarded by forty riders, but stops at a prison where the old man was incarcerated for years.

Sledge assembles his regular gang (including Joyce, Bice, Gutherie, Beetle, Kehoe and Hooker), they investigate the story, and equip themselves for the endeavor. The local sheriff recognizes the old man from the prison, causing a shootout, and Sledge and his gang flee.

The gang begins observing the gold guards and testing their defenses. Seeing how difficult it is to approach, the gang decides to get into the prison, turn the prisoners loose, and steal the gold in the ensuing havoc. Sledge is taken to the prison by Ward, who poses as a US Marshal needing to lock up his prisoner for the night. The warden is reluctant to incarcerate Sledge because he thinks it is the sheriff's business, but the sheriff arrives and attacks Sledge for killing a deputy earlier, convincing the warden to allow them to stay in a cell for the night. Later, Sledge, Ward, and nearby prisoners overpower the warden, killing him in the process. Taking his keys, they free the remaining prisoners, who begin to take over the rest of the prison. Sledge's gang dynamites the prison gate, creating enough noise to be heard in town, and the gold guards head to the prison.

The gold is held in a safe in a cell, but only the warden knew the combination. Sledge locks the old man up in his former cell, adjoining the cell with the safe, which he heard being opened for years. By sound, the old man guides Bice through opening the safe. The gold guards arrive and encounter armed, rioting prisoners and Sledge's gang. Ward is killed in the battle with the gold guards. The sheriff arrives again, and is killed in a running, horseback rifle-fight with Sledge.

The gang escapes and later stop to split the gold, with Sledge taking a double share, which the old man notes aloud. A musical montage shows a myriad of poker hands in which it appears the old man wins a substantial amount of the other outlaws' gold. Playing against Joyce, the old man finds that he has been cheated with sand substituted for gold dust and kills him. Guthrie objects to this, and angrily leaves after Sledge defends the old man's actions. Sledge then proceeds to win the old man's gold at poker, and most of everyone else's as well.

Sledge leaves with his winnings despite the gang's protestations, and the old man proposes they kidnap Ria. With her, they follow Sledge to a Spanish Mission town, deserted for a local festival. Now leading the gang, the old man attempts negotiating with Sledge, while one of the others tries to ambush him. Sledge is wounded while killing the bushwhacker, Kehoe, but still refuses to bargain, so the old man reveals their kidnapping of Ria, badly hurt by Bice, whom it is implied has raped and beaten her. A horrified Hooker vows to kill Bice when they get the gold.

Hearing her screams, Sledge abandons the gold while fighting his way to Ria, who says they did not need the gold to be happy, and uses her dying breath to warn that Bice is behind him with a rifle. Sledge kills Bice, then Hooker, and wounds the escaping old man, who threatens that he has hidden the gold where it can never be found without him. Remembering Ria's words, Sledge kills the old man and rides away empty-handed as the town refills with locals.

== Cast ==
- James Garner as Luther Sledge
- Dennis Weaver as Erwin Ward
- Claude Akins as Hooker
- John Marley as the "Old Man"
- Laura Antonelli as Ria
- Wayde Preston as Sheriff Ripley
- Ken Clark as Banjo Playing Deputy
- Tony Young as Mallory
- Herman Reynoso as Simms
- Steffen Zacharias as Red

Uncredited cast

- Paola Barbara as Jade
- Laura Betti as Sister
- Bruno Corazzari as Bice
- Remo De Angelis as poker player
- Altiero Di Giovanni as Kehoe
- Lorenzo Fineschi as Toby
- Franco Giornelli as Joyce
- Didi Perego as Elizabeth
- Lorenzo Piani as Guthrie
- Mario Valgoi as Beetle
- Vic Morrow as Gold Guard Scout
- Riccardo Garrone as Warden
- Luciano Rossi as 'The Wolf'
- Fausto Tozzi as prisoner
- Angelo Infanti as prisoner
- Franco Balducci as prisoner
- Tiberio Mitri as prisoner
- Barta Barri
- Orso Maria Guerrini
- Gianni Di Benedetto

== Theme song ==
- Title of the song: "Other Men's Gold"
  - Lyrics by Bill Martin and Phil Coulter
  - Sung by Stefan Grossman
  - "Dino" Edizione Musicali - Rome
