= Dr. Goldfoot and the Girl Bombs =

1966 film directed by Mario Bava

- Theatrical release poster
- Directed by: Mario Bava
- Screenplay by: Italian version: Castellano & Pipolo; Franco Dal Cer; English version: Louis M. Heyward; Robert Kaufman
- Story by: Italian version: Fulvio Lucisano; US version: James Hartford
- Produced by: Fulvio Lucisano; Louis M. Heyward
- Starring: Vincent Price; Fabian; Franco Franchi; Ciccio Ingrassia; Laura Antonelli
- Cinematography: Antonio Rinaldi
- Edited by: Italian version: Frederick Muller; US version: Ronald Sinclair
- Music by: Italian version: Lallo Gori; US version: Les Baxter
- Color process: Technicolor
- Production companies: Italian International Film; American International Pictures
- Distributed by: American International Pictures
- Release dates: July 29, 1966 (Italy); November 9, 1966 (U.S.)
- Running time: 82 minutes
- Countries: Italy; United States
- Languages: English; Italian

Dr. Goldfoot and the Girl Bombs (Italian: Le spie vengono dal semifreddo, lit. "The spies who came in from the cool") is a 1966 Eurospy comedy film, made in Technicolor and directed by Mario Bava. Serving as a sequel to two unrelated films, Dr. Goldfoot and the Bikini Machine and Two Mafiosi Against Goldginger, the film stars Vincent Price, Fabian, Francesco Mulé, Laura Antonelli, and the Italian comic duo Franco and Ciccio.

The film was shot in Italy by cinematographer Antonio Rinaldi, and released in both English and Italian versions. The Italian release is markedly different from the English-language edition, with more screen time spent on the antics of Franco and Ciccio, and less on Vincent Price and the other cast members. Additionally, the film's Italian title is entirely different, spoofing the 1965 film The Spy Who Came in from the Cold.

== Plot ==
Mad scientist Dr. Goldfoot is working with the Chinese government to use exploding female robots to disrupt a scheduled NATO war-game by blowing up the various generals involved in the exercise, one of whom looks exactly like Goldfoot, and whom Goldfoot later impersonates. Bill Dexter works to thwart the plot, that is, when he is not busy chasing women such as Rosanna. The film ends with an extended frantic chase through the streets of Rome, and Goldfoot attempting to start World War III between Russia and the United States by dropping a nuclear bomb on Moscow.

== Cast ==
- Vincent Price as Dr. Goldfoot / General Willis
- Fabian as Bill Dexter
- Franco Franchi as Franco
- Ciccio Ingrassia as Ciccio
- Laura Antonelli as Rosanna
- Francesco Mulé as Colonel Doug Benson
- Moa Tahi as Hardjob (uncredited)
- George Wang as Fong (uncredited)
- Gianfranco Funari as US Army Official (uncredited)
- Ennio Antonelli as Goldfoot Henchman (uncredited)
- Veriano Ginesi as Goldfoot Henchman (uncredited)
- Amerigo Santarelli as Goldfoot Henchman (uncredited)
- Mario Bava as Angel playing Harp (uncredited)

== Production ==
=== Development ===
Fulvio Lucisano, the head of Italian International Film, wanted to make a sequel to the Franco and Ciccio film Two Mafiosi Against Goldginger. American International Pictures agreed to co-finance, provided it could be turned into a sequel to Dr. Goldfoot and the Bikini Machine.

To satisfy the multinational financial backers, two versions of the film were eventually produced: the Italian version places greater emphasis on Franco and Ciccio, while the American film puts forward Vincent Price's Goldfoot.

Mario Bava was signed to direct. He had no interest in the film but was hired because Lucisano had him under contract, and he did not participate in the post-production phase of the American version.

AIP's executive supervising the shoot was Louis M. Heyward who had worked with Bava on Planet of the Vampires.

=== Casting ===
Frankie Avalon was originally intended to reprise his role as Craig Gamble from the first film, but he pulled out due to the impending birth of his third child, and Fabian Forte was cast in his place. Fabian said Jim Nicholson of AIP came to him and said "Frankie's having another baby and wants to stay at home... and we have this picture shooting in Italy... [he] was so sweet about it". Filmink thought it was a "mistake" that Jack Mullaney and Susan Hart did not return.

At one stage, the film was titled Dr. Goldfoot and the Love Bomb (a reference to How I Learned to Stop Worrying and Love the Bomb, the strapline of Dr. Strangelove), and Dr. Goldfoot and the S Bomb (a tongue-in-cheek reference to the phrase "sex bomb").

=== Filming ===
Filming started in April 1966 and took place in Rome, mostly at Cinecitta Studios but also such locations as Parco di Principe, the Rome Cavalieri Hilton, and Luna Park.

Louis M. Heyward estimates the script was rewritten about nine times just prior to production and says there were difficulties satisfying the Italian and American backers; some different scenes were shot for each country, including emphasising brunettes in the Italian version and blondes in the American version.

Heyward later said: "We had one person speaking Portuguese, several of them speaking Italian. Vincent would shake his head in disbelief and say 'What is happening to me?' Not only did he not understand the Italians or the Portuguese or the Spanish; he didn't understand Fabian".

When Price was asked about working with Bava he said: "I don't know what happened on the one we did together but perhaps it was not his fault".

Bava made a cameo as an angel.

== Reception ==
Two versions of the film were released, one in Italy which emphasized the Italian stars and relegated Price to a "guest star". The American version focused on Goldfoot/Price and was re-edited by Ronald Sinclair, re-scored, and re-written in the dubbing, all without Bava's input. Tim Lucas says the Italian version was "the far more entertaining" but "aside from some charmingly naive special effects" which Bava supervised the movie "cannot really be considered a Mario Bava film".

The film was not particularly successful, and is considered by many critics to be director Bava's worst film.

Samuel Z. Arkoff said that the film's commercial reception was hurt by the refusal of female lead Laura Antonelli to take her clothes off. Arkoff claims she was originally willing to, but then his nephew, Ted Rusoff, who was sent to supervise the film, developed a crush on her and persuaded her not to do it.

Price later called the film "the most dreadful movie I've ever been in. Just about everything that could go wrong, did".

Fabian said "I hid in the back seat of my car at the drive in when I went to go see it".

== Bibliography ==
- Blake, Matt; Deal, David (2004). The Eurospy Guide. Baltimore: Luminary Press. ISBN 1887664521.
