= Superargo and the Faceless Giants =

- Directed by: Paolo Bianchini
- Screenplay by: Julio Buchs
- Story by: Julio Buchs
- Starring: Giovanni Cianfriglia; Guy Madison; Luisa Baratto
- Cinematography: Aldo Greci; Godofredo Pacheco
- Music by: Berto Pisano
- Production companies: G. V. Cinematografica; Società Europea Cinematografica; Ízaro Films
- Release date: January 1968 (Italy)
- Running time: 102 minutes
- Countries: Italy; Spain

Superargo and the Faceless Giants (Italian: Superargo - L'invincibile Superman, Spanish: Superargo, el gigante, also known as Superargo, The King of Criminals and Superargo the Giant) is a 1968 Italian-Spanish science fiction-superhero film written and directed by Paolo Bianchini (here credited as "Paul Maxwell"). It is the sequel of Nick Nostro's Superargo Versus Diabolicus.

== Plot ==
Aided by a mystic guru, masked crimefighter Superargo battles the Faceless Giants, cyborgs created from kidnapped athletes. One of his friends wants to kill Superargo.

== Cast ==
- Ken Wood as Superargo
- Guy Madison as Prof. Wendland Wond
- Luisa Baratto as Claire Brand
- Diana Lorys as Gloria Devon
- Aldo Sambrell as Kamir / Pao-Ki
- Tomás Blanco as Davies
- Sergio Testori as Jo Brand
- Valerio Tordi as Professor Presenski
- Aldo Bufi Landi as J.G. Stafford
- Valentino Macchi as Bank Guard

== Release ==
Superargo and the Faceless Giants was submitted to the Italian censorship board in September 1967, but was not released until January 1968 in Italy. The film was released on home video in the United States from several labels including Code Red as a double feature with Wacky Taxi and as part of the Cinema Insomnia collection where it is interspersed with comic commentary by Mr. Lobo in a manner similar to horror host antecedents like Elvira, Mistress of the Dark. Rifftrax released a version with their own humorous commentary in December 2016.

== Reception ==
In a contemporary review, the Monthly Film Bulletin stated that "in the hierarchy of superheroes, Superargo....must rate lower than Jungle Jim." The review found Guy Madison "completely miscast" as "one of the most harmless-looking of villains". The review concluded that the film would "please easily-pleased children, but comic strip aficionados will find even less to arouse them here than in Doc Savage."

== See also ==
- List of Italian films of 1968
- List of Spanish films of 1968
