= Scampolo =

1958 film

- Directed by: Alfred Weidenmann
- Written by: Franz Höllering; Ilse Lotz-Dupont; Dario Niccodemi (play); Herbert Reinecker
- Produced by: Herbert Tischendorf
- Starring: Romy Schneider; Paul Hubschmid; Georg Thomalla
- Cinematography: Bruno Mondi
- Edited by: Carl Otto Bartning
- Music by: Hans-Martin Majewski; Franz Winkler
- Production company: Rhombus Film
- Distributed by: UFA
- Release date: 25 February 1958
- Running time: 89 minutes
- Country: West Germany
- Language: German

Scampolo is a 1958 German film directed by Alfred Weidenmann and starring Romy Schneider, Paul Hubschmid, and Georg Thomalla. Schneider plays the title role.

== Plot ==
Scampolo is a young, poor girl who lives on the island of Ischia. She falls in love with a young architect who hopes to win a design competition. Scampolo intercedes on his behalf with the minister and helps him to make his dream come true.

== Cast ==
- Romy Schneider as Scampolo
- Paul Hubschmid as Roberto Costa, architect
- Georg Thomalla as Andreas Michaels, fashion photographer
- Eva Maria Meineke as Sabina
- Franca Parisi as Franca
- Peter Carsten as Cesare
- Wolfgang Wahl as Baptiste
- Elisabeth Flickenschildt as Marietta
- Willy Millowitsch as Mayor
- Stanislav Ledinek as Flavio
- Walter Rilla as Lombardo
- Viktor de Kowa as Minister

== Production ==
The film's sets were designed by the art director Rolf Zehetbauer. Partly shot on location around Naples, the film was made in Agfacolor.
