= The Terror of Rome Against the Son of Hercules =

- Directed by: Mario Caiano
- Screenplay by: Mario Amendola; Alfonso Brecia]; Albert Valentin
- Story by: Mario Amendola; Alfonso Brecia; Albert Valentin
- Starring: Mark Forest; Marilu Tolo; Elisabetta Fanti; Robert Hundar
- Cinematography: Pier Ludovico Pavoni
- Edited by: Nella Nannuzzi
- Music by: Carlo Franci
- Release date: 26 March 1964 (Italy)
- Running time: 103 minutes
- Countries: Italy; France

The Terror of Rome Against the Son of Hercules (Italian: Maciste, gladiatore di Sparta) is a 1964 peplum film directed by Mario Caiano and starring Mark Forest and Marilù Tolo.

== Plot ==
The hero Maciste suffers with the Christians the persecution from the Roman Empire. He, as a Spartan gladiator, falls in love with a young Christian and must save her from his condemnation in the arena. Maciste makes a desperate attempt to save the Christians. He will have to win monsters and gladiators to get the victory and stay with his beloved.

== Cast ==
- Mark Forest as Maciste
- Marilù Tolo as Olympia
- Elisabeth Fanty as Livia
- Robert Hundar as Zefatius
- Giuseppe Addobbati as Marcellus
- Franco Cobianchi as Vitellius
- Ferruccio Amendola as Dammatius
- Jacques Stany as Epialtus

== See also ==
- List of Italian films of 1964

== Release ==
The Terror of Rome Against the Son of Hercules was released in Italy on March 26, 1964. It was released on home video by Something Weird Video.
