= Top Secret (1967 film) =

- Directed by: Fernando Cerchio
- Written by: Tulio Demicheli; Nino Stresa
- Produced by: Solly V. Bianco
- Starring: Gordon Scott; Magda Konopka
- Cinematography: Emilio Foriscot
- Music by: Piero Umiliani
- Release date: 1967

Top Secret (Italian: Segretissimo, Spanish: Secretísimo) is a 1967 Italian-Spanish Eurospy film directed by Fernando Cerchio and starring Gordon Scott.

== Cast ==
- Gordon Scott as John Sutton
- Magda Konopka as Sandra Dubois
- Aurora de Alba as Zaira
- Antonio Gradoli as Von Klausen
- Paco Morán as Miguel
- Mirko Ellis as Hardy
- Pietro Marascalchi as Hans
- Umberto Raho as Giorgio
- Santiago Rivero as Colonel Zikowsky

== Reception ==
The Italian film critic Marco Giusti described the film as "amusing, bizarre" and "full of genuine inventions and gags."
