= Franca Parisi =

Italian actress

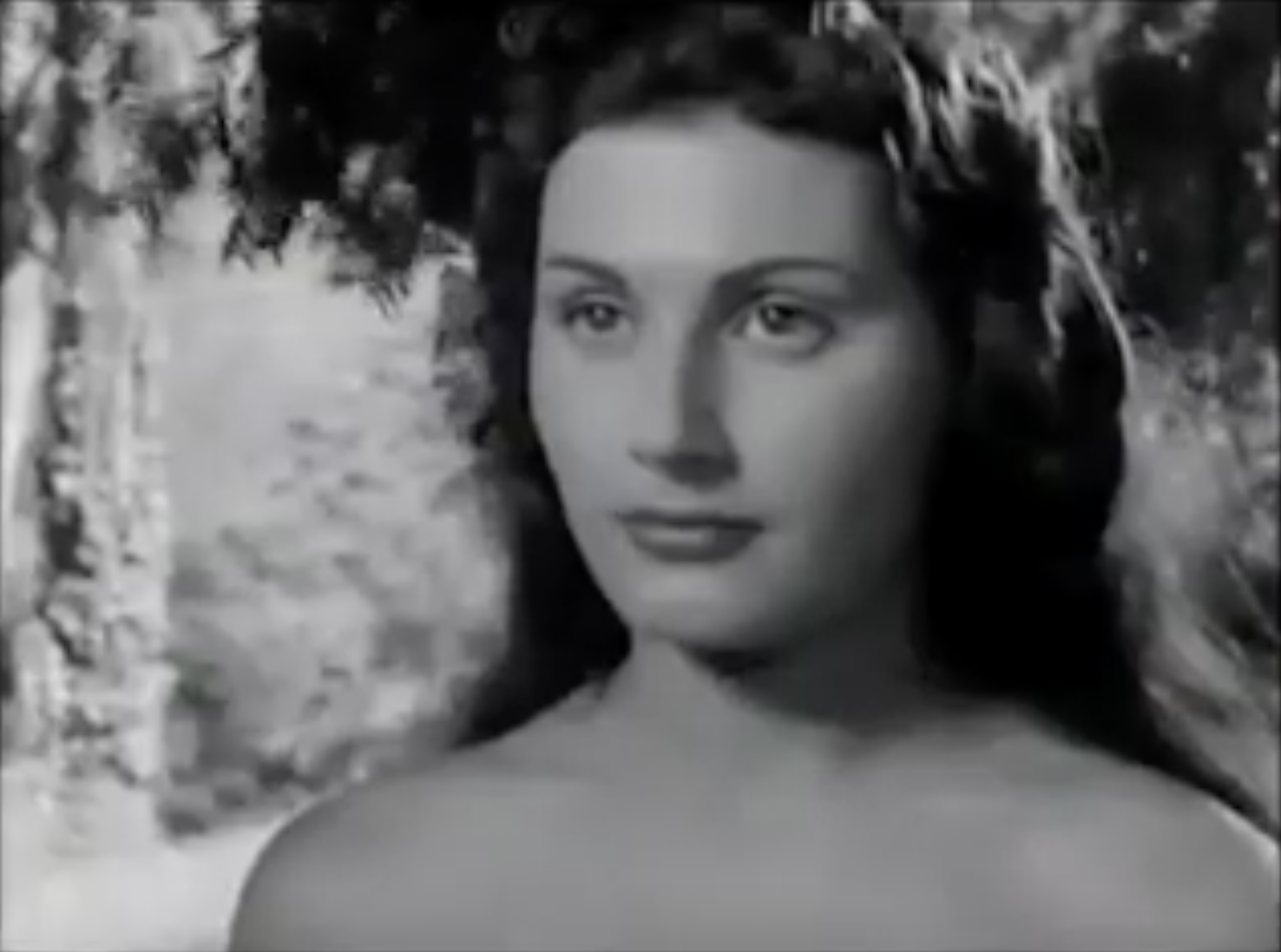
- Parisi in The Shadow on the Hill (1954)
- Born: September 28, 1933 (age 92); Palermo, Sicily, Italy
- Occupation: Actress

Franca Parisi (born 28 September 1933) is an Italian actress.

== Biography ==
Parisi graduated from the Centro Sperimentale di Cinematografia of Rome in 1955, and made her screen debut that same year in Raffaello Matarazzo's film The White Angel. She then acted in a number of films of the peplum or drama genre, sometimes under the pseudonym Margaret Taylor. In 1959, she married the Austrian actor Erwin Strahl.

In the '60s, Parisi came to television, where she starred in many television dramas : memorably, she played Jane in Anton Giulio Majano's The black arrow.

== Selected filmography ==
=== Cinema ===
- 1954: The Shadow on the Hill
- 1955: The White Angel
- 1958: Scampolo
- 1960: Atom Age Vampire
- 1962: Julius Caesar Against the Pirates
- 1962: The Old Testament
- 1963: The Ten Gladiators

=== Television ===
- 1963: Ritorna il tenente Sheridan
- 1965: Le avventure di Laura Storm
