= Golden Chameleon =

1967 film by Giorgio Stegani

- Directed by: Giorgio Stegani
- Written by: Ottavio Poggi; Giorgio Stegani
- Produced by: Elsio Mancuso
- Starring: Mark Damon; Luisa Baratto; Magda Konopka
- Cinematography: Sandro Mancori
- Edited by: Pier Luigi Basile
- Music by: Carlo Rustichelli
- Production companies: G.V. Cinematografica; SEC; Variety Film Production
- Release date: 21 July 1967
- Running time: 96 minutes
- Country: Italy
- Language: Italian

Golden Chameleon (Italian: Colpo doppio del camaleonte d'oro) is a 1967 Italian comedy crime film directed by Giorgio Stegani and starring Mark Damon, Luisa Baratto and Magda Konopka.

== Cast ==
- Mark Damon as Vittorio
- Luisa Baratto as Micaela
- Magda Konopka as Ginevra
- Luciano Pigozzi as Aragosta
- Daniele Vargas as Direttore della banca
- Poldo Bendandi as Ora Pro Nobis
- Umberto D'Orsi as Il Dottore
- Ugo Fangareggi as Einstein
- Giampiero Littera as Cassaforte
- Mino Doro as Guglielmo
- Giulio Farnese
- Giovanni Cianfriglia as Sgherro di Guglielmo
- Stefano Ceccarelli as Buttafuori
- Stefano Pescarelli
- Giulio Battiferri as Giuseppe
- Valentino Macchi as Impiegato di banca

== Bibliography ==
- Enrico Lancia & Fabio Melelli. Le straniere del nostro cinema. Gremese Editore, 2005.
