= Superargo Versus Diabolicus =

- Italian poster
- Directed by: Nick Nostro
- Screenplay by: Jaime Jesús Balcázar
- Story by: Mino Giarda
- Starring: Giovanni Cianfriglia; Gérard Tichy; Loredana Nusciak; Mónica Randall
- Cinematography: Francisco Marín
- Edited by: Teresa Alcocer
- Music by: Franco Pisano
- Production companies: Liber Film; S.E.C. Film; Producciones Cinematográficas Balcázar
- Release dates: December 1966 (Italy); 1967 (Spain)
- Running time: 88 minutes
- Countries: Italy; Spain

Superargo Versus Diabolicus (Italian: Superargo contro Diabolikus, Spanish: Superargo, el hombre enmascarado) is a 1966 superhero film written and directed by Nick Nostro. It had the sequel in 1968, Superargo and the Faceless Giants directed by Paolo Bianchini.

== Plot ==
Superargo is a super-powered masked wrestler turned secret agent who battles madman Diabolicus to stop him from stealing uranium as part of a plan to take over the world.

== Cast ==
- Giovanni Cianfriglia as Superargo
- Gérard Tichy as Diabolicus (as Gerhard Tichy)
- Loredana Nusciak as Diabolicus' Mistress
- Mónica Randall as Lidia
- Francisco Castillo Escalona as Col. Alex Kinski
- Emilio Messina as Diabolicus' Henchman
- Geoffrey Copleston as Conrad

== Production ==
Director Nick Nostro commented on actor Giovanni Cianfriglia as Superargo in the film, stating that he had him act like Zorro. Nostro claimed he got him the best voice actor he could find and then felt "despite his shortcomings, he made a good impression on screen." Nostro stated that the film was shot with exteriors in Barcelona and interiors shot in Rome at De Paolis studios. Nostro added that due to the cheap budget, his producer had them shoot some indoor scenes at his villa in Frascati.

== Release ==
Superargo Versus Diabolicus opened in Rome in December 1966. It was released in Spain in 1967 as Superargo contra Diabolicus.

It was followed by a sequel Superargo and the Faceless Giants (1968).

== See also ==
- List of Italian films of 1966
- List of Spanish films of 1966
