= Colossus of the Arena =

1962 film

- Directed by: Michele Lupo
- Written by: Lionello De Felice; Ernesto Guida
- Produced by: Elio Scardamaglia
- Starring: Mark Forest; Scilla Gabel
- Cinematography: Guglielmo Mancori
- Edited by: Alberto Gallitti
- Music by: Francesco De Masi
- Release date: September 13, 1962
- Country: Italy
- Language: Italian

Colossus of the Arena (Italian: Maciste il gladiatore più forte del mondo, also known as Death on the Arena) is a 1962 Italian peplum film directed by Michele Lupo and starred by Mark Forest.

== Synopsis ==
In the small kingdom of Mersabad, a man named Oniris leads a group of conspirators planning a coup. Oniris hires gladiators as mercenaries to fight against the kingdom's army, and among them is Maciste, hired to protect Princess Talima. When Talima is kidnapped, Maciste pledges to rescue her. After succeeding, he eliminates the conspirators, including Oniris. Eventually, Maciste discovers that Talima's sister was involved with Oniris. He exposes her and restores Princess Talima as the rightful ruler to the throne.

== Cast ==
- Mark Forest as Maciste/Colossus
- Scilla Gabel as Talima
- José Greci as Resia
- Germano Longo as Ligonius
- Erno Crisa as Oniris
- Dan Vadis as Sidone
- Harold Bradley as Tuco
- Carlo Pisacane as oste
- Vittorio Sanipoli as Slavo
- Alfio Caltabiano as Psychios
- Sal Borgese as Gladiator
