= Wayde Preston =

American actor

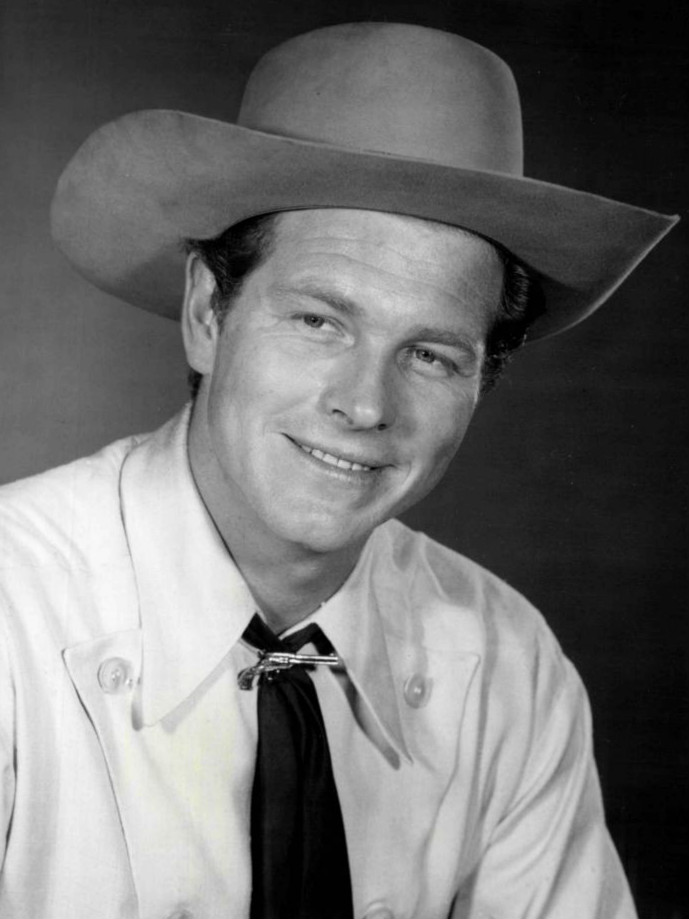
- Preston as Christopher Colt (1958)
- Born: William Erskine Strange; September 10, 1929; Steamboat Springs, Colorado, U.S.
- Died: February 6, 1992 (aged 62); Lovelock, Nevada, U.S.
- Education: University of Wyoming
- Occupation: Actor
- Years active: 1957–1990
- Spouse: Carol Ohmart (m. 1956–1958)

Wayde Preston (born William Erskine Strange; September 10, 1929 – February 6, 1992) was an American actor cast from 1957 to 1960 in the lead role in 67 episodes of the ABC/Warner Bros. Western television series, Colt .45.

== Background ==
Preston was born William Erskine Strange in Steamboat Springs, Colorado. He grew up in Laramie, Wyoming, and his father taught in a high school there. He was a park ranger and performed musically on the rodeo circuit before he got his break as an actor.

Preston attended the University of Wyoming and served 4 1/2 years in the Army, half of that time in Korea. He served with anti-aircraft forces, paratroops and tanks before coming out as a first lieutenant in 1954.

== Acting career ==
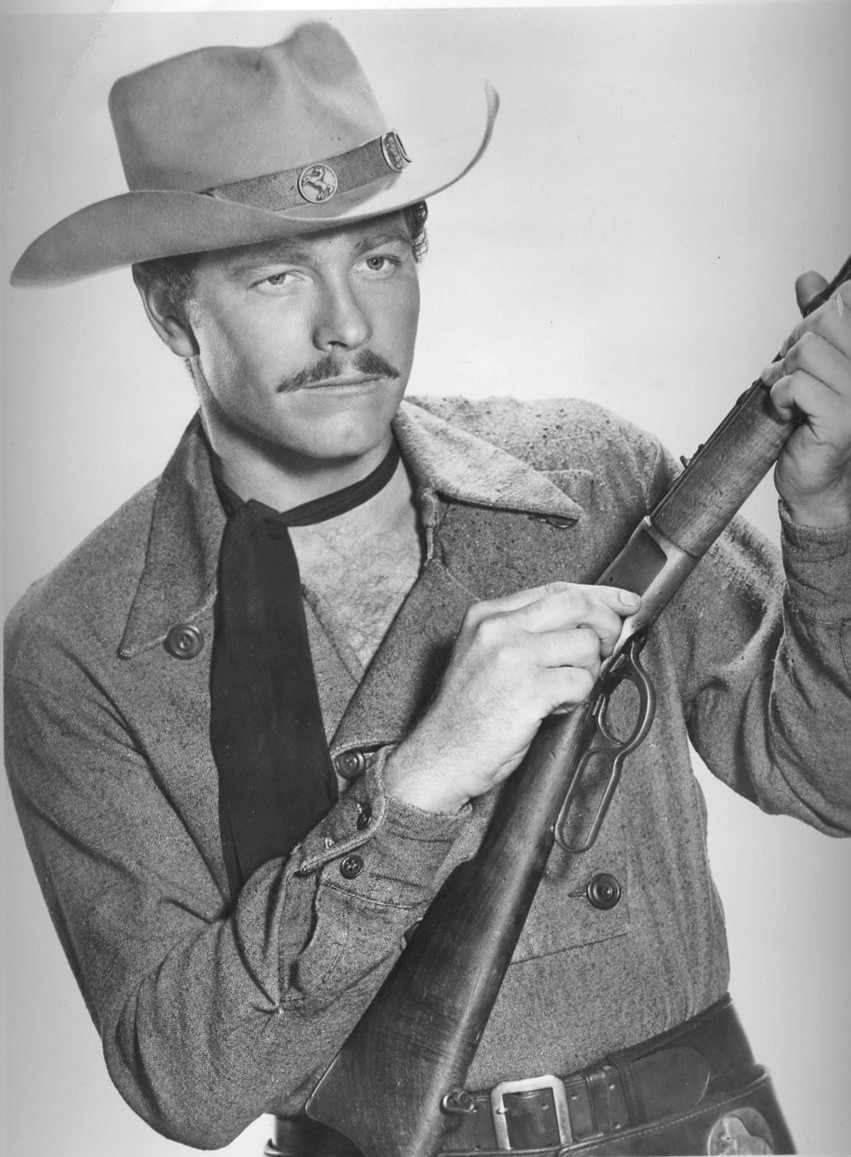
Preston in Colt .45 (1959)

In Colt .45 he played Christopher Colt, a government undercover agent who masquerades as a Colt 45 revolver salesman traveling throughout the Old West. Preston also played the role of Christopher Colt in 1958 and 1959 in four episodes relating to "The Canary Kid" of the ABC/WB Sugarfoot series. Preston appeared in "The Saga of Waco Williams" on Maverick.

Preston played some 20 roles in television and films from 1957 to 1991. He left acting in 1959 to become an executive in Comanche Aero Service at Van Nuys Airport, a firm that sold airplanes and provided air charter services. He attributed the change to a difference in income and the way he was treated as an actor. "It wasn't just the hard work and low pay," he said. "The studio did petty things that added insult to injury. I got tired of being treated like an ingenue." He said that he thought he was going to make feature films when he signed with the studio, and he felt that continuing in a TV series would harm his career. As a licensed pilot, he flew some of the charters himself.

Following his departure from Colt .45, he went to Europe, where he appeared in numerous Spaghetti Westerns, including A Man Called Sledge and the 1968 film Anzio, about the World War II Battle of Anzio. Preston played Logan in another 1968 film, Wrath of God; he was then cast in 1969 as Marshal Johnny Silver in Death Knows No Time. He appeared on episodes of NBC's Bonanza and ABC's Starsky & Hutch. His last screen appearance was in a supporting role in the 1990 film version of Captain America.

== Personal life ==
In 1956, Preston married actress Carol Ohmart. They divorced in 1958. Preston died of cancer on February 6, 1992, aged 62, in Lovelock, Nevada.

== Filmography ==
Year	Title	Role	Notes
1966	Man on the Spying Trapeze	Jerry Land	
1968	Today We Kill... Tomorrow We Die!	Jeff Milton	
1968	A Long Ride from Hell	Marlin Mayner	
1968	Anzio	Col. Hendricks	
1968	Wrath of God	Logan	
1969	Pagó cara su muerte	Marshal Johnny Silver	
1969	Bootleggers	Grim Doel	
1969	Dio perdoni la mia pistola	Johnny 'Texas' Brennan	
1969	Boot Hill	McGavin	Uncredited
1970	Sartana in the Valley of Death	Anthony Douglas	
1970	A Man Called Sledge	Sheriff Ripley	
1970	Hey Amigo! A Toast to Your Death	'Doc' Williams	
1976	Hollywood Man	Tex	
1980	Smokey and the Judge	Gangster	
1990	Captain America	Jack Cooperman	(final film role)
