= Hey Amigo! A Toast to Your Death =

1970 film

- Directed by: Paolo Bianchini
- Written by: Renato Savino; Roberto Colangeli
- Starring: Wayde Preston
- Cinematography: Sergio D'Offizi
- Music by: Carlo Savina
- Release date: 1970
- Country: Italy
- Language: Italian

Hey Amigo! A Toast to Your Death (Italian: Ehi amigo... sei morto!, also known as Ehi amigo... Rest in Peace) is a 1970 Italian Spaghetti Western film directed by Paolo Bianchini and starring Wayde Preston.

== Plot ==
Dove Williams, a postal officer, pursues a gang of violent outlaws that rob a Texas stagecoach.

== Cast ==
- Wayde Preston as 'Doc' Williams
- Rik Battaglia as Barnett
- Aldo Berti as Black
- Agnès Spaak as Pachita
- Raf Baldassarre as Manolo
- Marco Zuanelli as El Loco
- Claudio De Davide as Nathaniel
- Franca Scagnetti as Nathaniel's Wife
