= Son of Samson =

- Directed by: Carlo Campogalliani
- Written by: Oreste Biancoli; Ennio De Concini
- Produced by: Domenico Seymandi
- Starring: Mark Forest; Chelo Alonso
- Cinematography: Riccardo Pallottini
- Music by: Carlo Innocenzi
- Release date: 1960
- Country: Italy
- Language: Italian

Son of Samson (Italian: Maciste nella Valle dei Re/ Maciste in the Valley of the Kings, also known as Maciste the Mighty) is a 1960 Italian peplum film directed by Carlo Campogalliani and starring Mark Forest. The film was distributed to English-speaking countries as Son of Samson, although in the original film, Maciste had no relation to Samson whatsoever.

== Plot ==
During the Persian rule over Egypt (circa 525-480 B.C.), the young prince Kenamon is used to wandering about and mixing with the poor people. Once, he finds himself in a life-threatening situation and is saved by a strong man, Maciste. On another occasion, he sees a beautiful girl, Nofret, and falls in love with her. He talks with his father the Pharaoh Amirteo I, about being much impressed with the hunger and miserable living conditions of the people. His father decides to raise an army against the Persians, but his beautiful but cunning wife Smedes, godmother of Kenamon and allied of the Persian Gran Visir, kills him before he acts. Once on the throne of Pharaoh, Kenamon is drugged with a substance prepared by Smedes, and loses his will-power. Meanwhile, Nofret is about to be sold as a slave. Maciste becomes the leader of the people's revolt, and is acclaimed at the local games. Maciste gets Nofret free, manages not to fall under Smedes' love filters, and gathers and leads a rebellious army against the Persian troops and the palace guard. The Grand Visir and Smedes are killed and thus Kenamon is free from his stupor. Kenamon thanks Maciste for his decisive help, and marries Nofret at last.

== Cast ==
- Mark Forest as Maciste
- Chelo Alonso as Queen Smedes
- Vira Silenti as Tekaet
- Angelo Zanolli as Pharaoh Kenamun
- Federica Ranchi as Nofret
- Carlo Tamberlani as Pharaoh Armiteo I
- Nino Musco as Senneka the Camel Driver
- Zvonimir Rogoz as Grand Visir
- Ignazio Dolce as Tradesman
