= Satanik (film) =

- Directed by: Piero Vivarelli
- Story by: Eduardo Manzanos Brochero
- Starring: Magda Konopka; Julio Peña; Umberto Raho
- Cinematography: Silvano Ippoliti
- Edited by: Gianmaria Messeri
- Music by: Romano Mussolini; Roberto Pregadio
- Production companies: Rodiacines; Copercines
- Distributed by: Variety Distribution
- Release date: 1968 (Italy)
- Running time: 86 minutes
- Countries: Italy; Spain

Satanik is a 1968 film directed by Piero Vivarelli. It is based on the Italian comic series Satanik and was released to a moderate financial success in Italy.

== Plot ==
Dr. Bannister (Magda Konopka), an ugly and disfigured woman, is summoned by a colleague of hers who has recently discovered a serum for rejuvenating living beings. The colleague shows Bannister the miraculous result of his experiments, injecting the serum into an animal close to death. In a few seconds, the animal is reinvigorated, showing vigor and health.

The colleague, however, does not intend to use the serum on human beings, as some experiments remain to be conducted. In a moment of distraction Bannister kills the colleague, following which she drinks the serum he had developed.

After a series of convulsions, the woman falls unconscious to the ground, but shortly thereafter awakens rejuvenated and beautiful. The murder of the colleague will be only the first of a long series: Bannister, in fact, will kill again to hide her secret. Moreover, the woman will need to reckon with the fact that the effects of the serum are only temporary.

== Cast ==
- Magda Konopka as Marnie Bannister
- Julio Peña as Inspector Trent
- Umberto Raho as George Van Donan
- Luigi Montini as Dodo La Roche
- Armando Calvo as Inspector Gonzalez
- Mimma Ippoliti as Stella Dexter
- Isarco Ravaioli as Max Bermuda
- Nerio Bernardi as Professor Greaves
- Pino Polidori as Albert
- Antonio Pica as Louis
- Piero Vivarelli as Police Commissioner

== Production ==
Satanik was filmed in 1967 shortly after Piero Vivarelli's film Avenger X was released. The film is credits state that the film was scripted by Eduardo Manzanos Brochero. Despite being based on the character from the Satanik comics, the film ignores most of the stories and characters and only keeps Marny Bannister's transformation from an old woman to a slim young woman from the original stories.

== Release ==
Satanik was released in Italy in 1968. Film critic and historian Roberto Curti described the box office as being "moderately successful" in Italy.

The film was released on DVD by Retromedia and also part of Image Entertainment's "Euro Fiends from Beyond the Grave" compilation along with The Faceless Monster and The Red Headed Corpse. It will receive a Blu-ray release in 2024 by Terror Vision Records and Videos.

== Reception ==
From retrospective reviews, Roberto Curti noted the film was "perhaps the most disappointing of the flicks based on the fumetti neri phenomenon." Curti found the film to be poorly scripted and paced and criticized the weak acting performance by Magda Konopka.

Future film director Pupi Avati was an assistant director on the film for its scenes shot in Italy. Avati later commented his experience on the set stating that watching Vivarelli taught him how to not direct a film.

== See also ==
- List of Italian films of 1968
- List of Spanish films of 1968
