= Federica Ranchi =

Italian film actress (1939–2025)

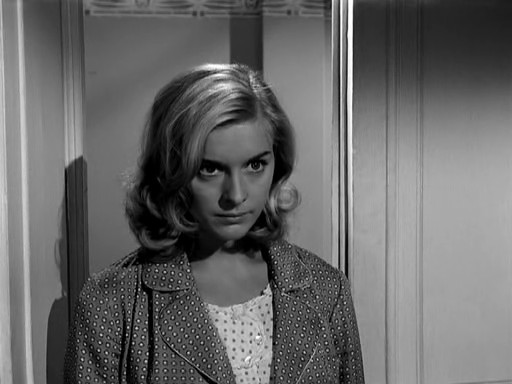
- Ranchi in Violent Summer (1959)
- Born: 5 May 1939; Trieste, Italy
- Died: 15 May 2025 (aged 86); Aegina, Greece
- Occupation: Actress
- Years active: 1956–1962

Federica Ranchi (5 May 1939 – 15 May 2025) was an Italian actress.

== Life and career ==
Born in Trieste, while a student at liceo linguistico Ranchi was noted by a Cines employee through a picture of her ballet company, and subsequently won an audition for the Leonardo De Mitri's comedy-drama Wives and Obscurities.

Typically cast in roles of sensitive and fragile women, following several roles with auteurs such as Valerio Zurlini and Gillo Pontecorvo and in some genre films, in 1963 Ranchi married a Greek shipowner and eventually retired from showbusiness, even refusing a five-year contract with Dino De Laurentiis.

Ranchi died on 15 May 2025, at the age of 86.

== Selected filmography ==
- Wives and Obscurities (1956)
- The Wide Blue Road (1957)
- Devil's Cavaliers (1959)
- Violent Summer (1959)
- Son of Samson (1960)
- Goliath and the Dragon (1960)
- Women of Devil's Island (1962)
