= José Greci =

Italian film, television and stage actress (1941-2017)

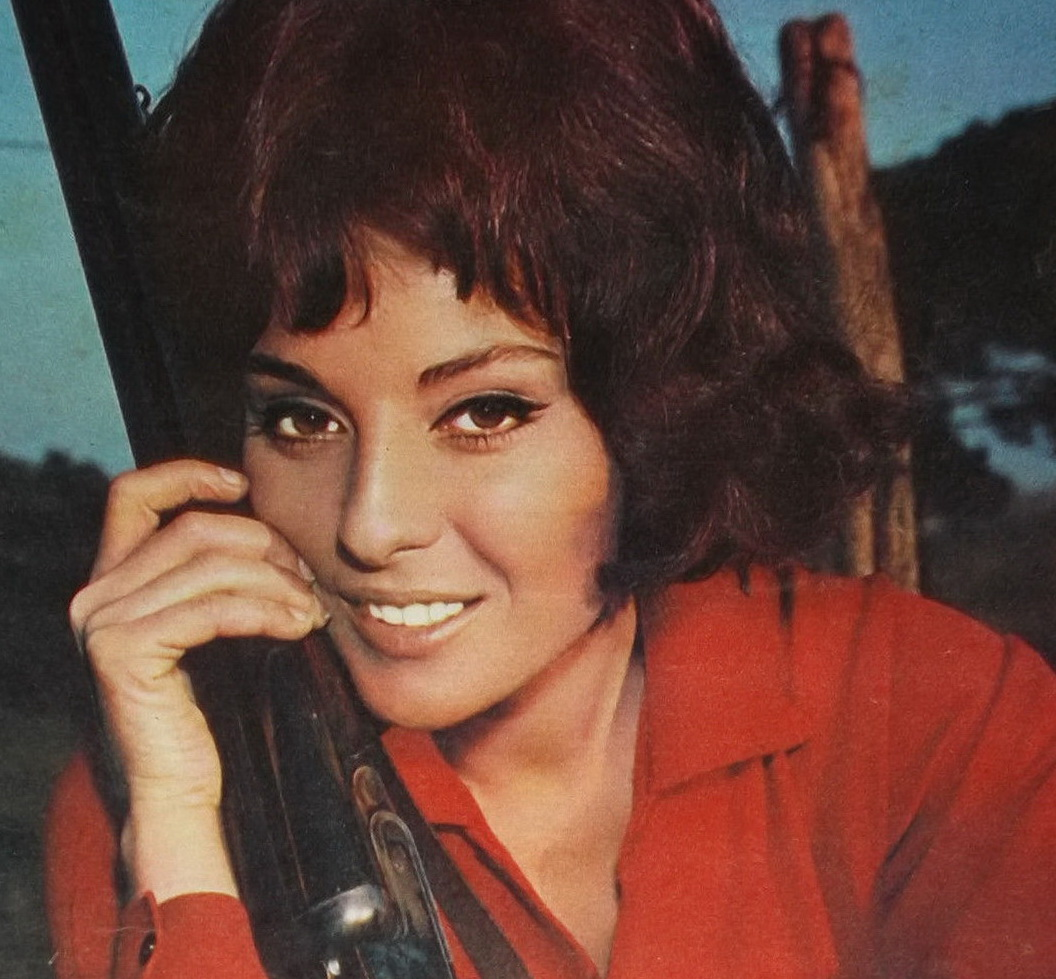
- Born: 10 January 1941; Ferrara, Kingdom of Italy
- Died: 1 June 2017 (aged 76); Rome, Italy
- Occupation: Actress
- Years active: 1958–1974

José Greci (10 January 1941 – 1 June 2017) was an Italian film, television and stage actress.

== Life and career ==
Born in Ferrara, Italy, as Giuseppina Greci, the daughter of the journalist and television writer Luigi. In 1956 at just fifteen years old Greci enrolled at the Silvio d'Amico National Academy of Dramatic Arts; after two years she left the academy to debut on stage.

Greci made her film debut in 1959, playing the Virgin Mary in William Wyler's Ben-Hur. From then she started appearing in dozens of genre films, soon becoming one of the most prolific actresses in 1960s Italian cinema, particularly becoming a star in the sword-and-sandal and eurospy genres. Also active on television, she gradually abandoned her career during the seventies. She died in Rome, Italy on 1 June 2017, aged 76.

== Selected filmography ==
- La cento chilometri (1959) - The Cello Player Friend of Elena
- Ben-Hur (1959) - Mary (uncredited)
- Revenge of the Barbarians (1960) - Sabina
- Duel of the Titans (1961) - Estia
- Le italiane e l'amore (1961) - (segment "Un matrimonio")
- Il sangue e la sfida (1962)
- Colossus of the Arena (1962) - Revia
- The Rebel Gladiators (1962) - Arminia
- War Gods of Babylon (1962) - Crisia
- Zorro and the Three Musketeers (1963) - Isabella
- Goliath and the Sins of Babylon (1963) - Regia / Chelima
- The Bread Peddler (1963) - Amanda
- Hercules and the Masked Rider (1963) - Dona Blanca - Francisco's Daughter
- Hercules Against the Mongols (1963) - Bianca de Tudela
- The Ten Gladiators (1963) - Livia
- Death on the Fourposter (1964) - Kitty
- Hercules Against the Barbarians (1964) - Arminia / Armina
- 'Sword of the Empire (1964) - Nissia, blonde slave
- La vendetta dei gladiatori (1964) - Priscilla
- Espionage in Tangier (1965) - Lee Randall
- Seven Rebel Gladiators (1965) - Assuer
- Operation Poker (1965) - Helga
- Last Man to Kill (1966) - Ellen
- Special Code: Assignment Lost Formula (1966) - Lynn
- Maigret a Pigalle (1966) - Arlette
- Bury Them Deep (1968) - Consuelo
- All on the Red (1968) - Yvette
- The Most Beautiful Couple in the World (1968)
- The Sicilian Connection (1972) - Lucia
- Catene (1974) - (final film role)
