= Giovanni Cianfriglia =

Italian actor (1935–2024)

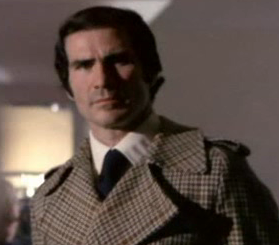
- Cianfriglia in La polizia ha le mani legate (1975)
- Born: 5 April 1935; Anzio, Lazio, Italy
- Died: 30 October 2024 (aged 89); Anzio, Lazio, Italy
- Other name: Ken Wood
- Occupations: Actor, stuntman
- Years active: 1958–2000

Giovanni Cianfriglia (5 April 1935 – 30 October 2024), also known as Ken Wood, was an Italian film actor and stuntman. He appeared in more than 100 films from 1958 to 2000.

== Life and career ==
Born in Anzio, Cianfriglia debuted as the body double of Steve Reeves in Hercules, then he started appearing, often uncredited, as a stuntman in dozens of genre films. Since the second half of the 1960s he starred in several adventure films and Spaghetti Westerns in leading roles using the stage name Ken Wood. Cianfriglia died on 30 October 2024, at the age of 89.

== Selected filmography ==
- 1961 The Trojan Horse
- 1963 Sandokan the Great
- 1964 La vendetta dei gladiatori
- 1964 Castle of Blood
- 1965 Hercules the Avenger
- 1965 Desperate Mission
- 1966 Superargo Versus Diabolicus
- 1967 Massacre Mania
- 1967 The Devil's Man
- 1967 Golden Chameleon
- 1968 No Graves on Boot Hill
- 1968 Superargo and the Faceless Giants
- 1968 Bury Them Deep
- 1968 Kill Them All and Come Back Alone
- 1968 Gunman Sent by God
- 1971 Drummer of Vengeance
- 1972 Life Is Tough, Eh Providence?
- 1975 Peur sur la ville
- 1975 Who Breaks... Pays
- 1975 Killer Cop
- 1975 The Climber
- 1976 Keoma
- 1980 Everything Happens to Me
- 1981 Buddy Goes West
- 1984 Tuareg – The Desert Warrior
- 1984 The Final Executioner
- 1990 Le comiche
- 2000 Alex l'ariete
