= Nick Nostro =

Italian film director (1931–2014)

- Born: Nicola Nostro; 21 April 1931; Gioia Tauro, Calabria, Italy
- Died: 15 June 2014 (aged 83); Gioia Tauro, Calabria, Italy
- Occupations: Film director, screenwriter

Nicola "Nick" Nostro (21 April 1931 – 15 June 2014) was an Italian film director who wrote many of his screenplays.

== Career ==
Born in Gioia Tauro, Calabria, after his degree in literature Nostro studied direction at the Silvio d’Amico Academy of Dramatic Arts in Rome. He entered the film industry as an assistant editor and script supervisor, then, from 1956, he was assistant director for Roberto Bianchi Montero and Giorgio Simonelli. In the 1960s, he directed a number of films, crossing all the most popular genres of the time, including peplum, eurospy, Spaghetti Westerns and adventure films. He retired in the early 1970s.

== Filmography ==
- Blood and Defiance (1962)
- Vendetta at Sorrento (1963)
- Triumph of the Ten Gladiators (1964)
- Spartacus and the Ten Gladiators (1964)
- Operation Counterspy (1965)
- Dollar of Fire (1965)
- Web of Violence (1966)
- Superargo Versus Diabolicus (1966)
- Day After Tomorrow (1968)
- Grazie zio, ci provo anch'io (1971)
