= Mark Forest =

American actor and bodybuilder (1933–2022)

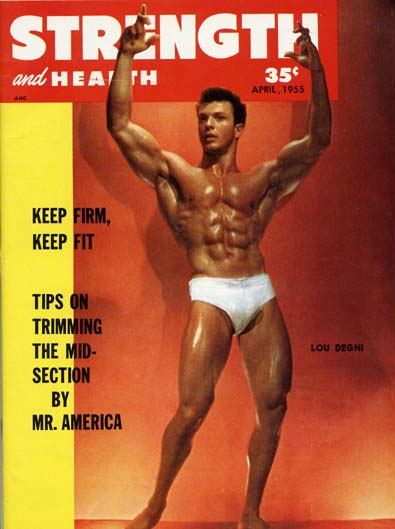
- Forest in 1955
- Born: Lorenzo Luis Degni; January 6, 1933; New York City, U.S.
- Died: January 7, 2022 (aged 89)
- Occupations: Bodybuilder, film actor

Lou Degni (January 6, 1933 – January 7, 2022), known professionally as Mark Forest, was an American actor and bodybuilder – widely known as the protagonist in a series of 1960s sword and sandal or peplum movies — including his recurring role as Maciste.

== Life and career ==
Born Lorenzo Louis (Lou) Degni in Brooklyn, NY, Forest was a third generation Italian-American; his grandparents were from Naples. He began bodybuilding at 13, subsequently opening his own gym on Long Island. A talent scout saw his picture and invited him to Hollywood to audition for the role of Tarzan. Though he did not get the part, he became a member of the musclemen troupe in Mae West's Las Vegas stage show. During this time he entered numerous weightlifting competitions, winning the title of "Mr. Muscle Beach" in Venice, California.

After the worldwide success of Hercules, he became the second American actor recruited by Italian producers (after Steve Reeves), and was signed to a three-picture contract with La vendetta di Ercole (retitled Goliath and the Dragon) as his first film for the US market. At this time Degni began using the pseudonym Mark Forest, and using his advantage of speaking fluent Italian prior to arriving in Europe. For the English version of the film he was dubbed by Jackson Beck who voiced Bluto in the Popeye cartoons.

Forest continued in the peplum genre, active in Rome from 1961-1965, leaving the cinema to pursue a career as a European opera singer (tenor), skilled in the bel canto technique, instructed by Giovanni Millo, composer and former tenor of the Metropolitan Opera of New York, father of the lyric soprano Aprile Millo. In his later years, Forest became a vocal coach in Studio City, California.

He later lived in Arleta, California, and died on January 7, 2022, a day after his 89th birthday.

== Filmography ==
Year	Title	Role	Notes
1954	The Egyptian	Minor Role	Uncredited
1960	Goliath and the Dragon	Ercole / Emilius the Goliath	
1960	Son of Samson	Maciste - Son of Hercules	
1961	Mole Men Against the Son of Hercules	Maciste - Son of Hercules	
1962	Colossus of the Arena	Maciste - Son of Hercules	
1963	Goliath and the Sins of Babylon	Maciste / Goliath / Marcellus	
1963	Hercules Against the Mongols	Maciste	
1964	The Terror of Rome Against the Son of Hercules	Maciste	
1964	Hercules Against the Barbarians	Maciste / Hercules	
1964	The Lion of Thebes	Arian	
1964	Hercules Against the Sons of the Sun	Hercules	
1964	The Magnificent Gladiator	Hercules / Attalus	
1965	Kindar the Invulnerable	Kindar	(final film role)
