= Hercules Against the Barbarians =

- Directed by: Domenico Paolella
- Screenplay by: Domenico Paolella; Alessandro Ferrau; Luciano Martino
- Story by: Domenico Paolella; Alessandro Ferrau
- Produced by: Jacopo Comin; Felice Felicioni
- Starring: Mark Forest; Jose Greci; Ken Clark; Gloria Milland; Howard Ross
- Cinematography: Raffaele Masciochi
- Edited by: Otello Colangeli
- Music by: Giuseppe Piccillo
- Production company: Jonia Film
- Distributed by: Variety Distribution
- Release date: 16 April 1964 (Italy)
- Running time: 96 minutes
- Country: Italy

Hercules Against the Barbarians (Italian: Maciste nell'inferno di Gengis Khan, lit. 'Maciste in Genghis Khan's Hell') is a 1964 Italian peplum film directed by Domenico Paolella.

When the Mongols invade Europe, they are defeated at Krakow for the first time after many victories. Kubilai (Ken Clark), the responsible commander, asks his emperor Genghis Khan for a second chance. Kubilai has two ideas how to avoid another defeat. First, he wants to eliminate Maciste (aka Hercules in the American dubbed version), the hero of the Polish people, played by Mark Forest. And then, Kubilai holds a prisoner who reveals an important secret: the princess and future queen of Poland lives in a village under false identity. The Mongols want to capture her, but of course, Maciste is a guardian to any maiden in distress...

== Cast ==
- Mark Forest as Hercules / Maciste
- José Greci as Arminia
- Ken Clark as Kubilai
- Gloria Milland as Arias
- Roldano Lupi as Genghis Khan
- Howard Ross as Gason
- Mirko Ellis as King Vladimir
- Bruno Scipioni

== Release ==
Hercules Against the Barbarians was released in Italy on 16 April 1964.

== Reception ==
Film critic Howard Hughes objected a lack of "logic and history".

== See also ==
- List of films featuring Hercules
