= La vendetta dei gladiatori =

- Directed by: Luigi Capuano
- Screenplay by: Arpad DeRiso; Roberto Gianviti
- Story by: Arpad DeRiso; Luigi Capuano
- Starring: Mickey Hargitay; José Greci
- Cinematography: Raffaele Masciocchi
- Edited by: Antonietta Zita
- Music by: Giuseppe Piccillo
- Production company: Splendor Film
- Release date: December 31, 1964 (Italy)
- Running time: 98 minutes
- Country: Italy
- Language: Italian

La vendetta dei gladiatori (lit. 'The revenge of the gladiators') is a 1964 Italian peplum film directed by Luigi Capuano and starring Mickey Hargitay and José Greci.

== Plot ==
The film depicts the Western Roman Empire in the 450s. The city of Rome itself is besieged by Genseric and his Vandals. The empire is depicted as weak and corrupt, while under the control of the ineffectual emperor Valentinian III and his wife Calpurnia. The Roman general Aetius manages to temporarily halt the advance of the Vandals. Fabius, a son of Aetius, falls in love with princess Priscilla, a daughter of the imperial couple. Genseric plans to marry his own son to Priscilla, in a plot to take over the Roman throne.

Genseric fails to capture Priscilla, but captures Fabius instead. He uses torture while questioning Fabius about the princess' whereabouts. Priscilla surrenders herself to Genseric in exchange for Fabius' safety and freedom. Genseric seemingly agrees to her terms, but eventually double-crosses Priscilla. On her wedding day, Genseric offers Priscilla a crucified Fabius. Fabius' Roman allies soon arrive to rescue him and defeat the Vandals.

== Cast ==
- Mickey Hargitay as Fabius
- José Greci as Priscilla
- Livio Lorenzon as Geiserik
- Renato Baldini as General Aetius
- Roldano Lupi as Valentinianus III
- Andrea Checchi as Gabinus
- Nerio Bernardi as Tidone
- Andreina Paul as Calpurnia
- Mirko Ellis as Wilfried
- Giulio Tomei as Priest
- Dante Maggio as Drinker at the Tavern
- Giovanni Cianfriglia as Fulvius
- Amedeo Trilli as Master the Fortress
- Bruno Scipioni

== Release ==
La vendetta dei gladiatori was released in Italy on December 31, 1964. It was released to television in the United States in 1965 by American International Television as Revenge of the Gladiators.
