= Aldo Falivena =

Italian journalist (1928–2021)

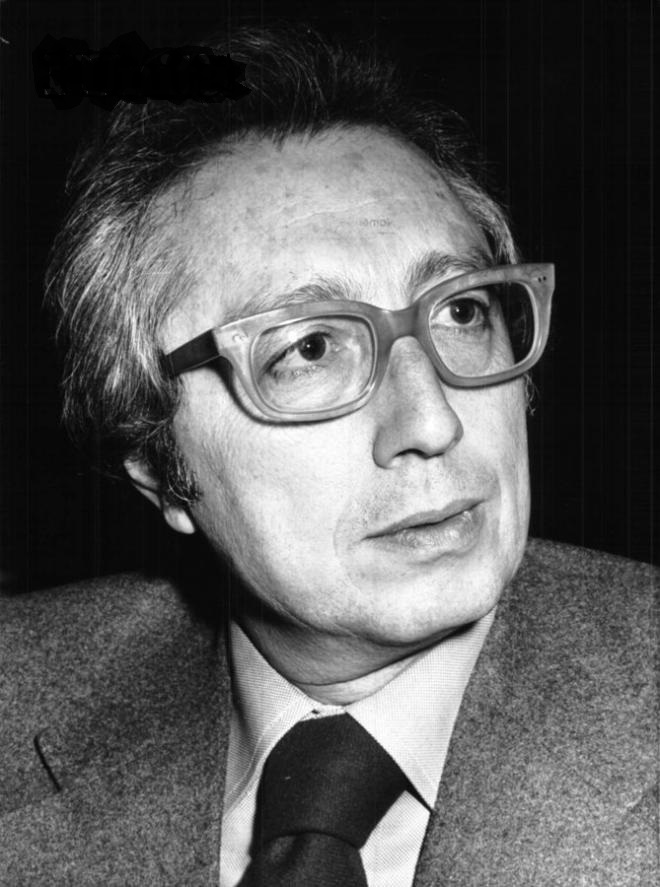
- Photo of Aldo Falivena
- Born: 18 February 1928; Salerno, Italy
- Died: 22 November 2021 (aged 93)
- Occupation: Journalist

Aldo Falivena (18 February 1928 – 22 November 2021) was an Italian journalist.

== Biography ==
Falivena was born on 18 February 1928 in Salerno. He died on 22 November 2021, at the age of 93.

Aldo Falivena was a reporter in Salerno, his hometown, in the 1950s. During those years, he graduated in law from the University of Naples Federico II and began writing about the flood that devastated his city and the Amalfi coast in 1954 for the front page of the daily newspaper Il Giornale di Napoli, edited by Carlo Zaghi, who hired him as an intern. He also began contributing stories and articles for the third page of Giovanni Spadolini Il Resto del Carlino.

In 1958,Enzo Biagi—whom he had met during a previous study trip to the United States—hired him in Milan for the weekly magazine Epoca, of which he was the editor-in-chief.In this city, he connected and collaborated with another master of journalism, Gaetano Afeltra, originally from Amalfi, who poured his creativity, imagination, and professional rigor into Corriere d'Informazione, the afternoon edition of Corriere della Sera, for which he wrote articles on current affairs and lifestyle.

A few years later came the turning point: from print media to television. In 1961, Enzo Biagi moved to Rome to direct the television news and appointed Falivena as editor-in-chief of RT, RAI first magazine program.

Subsequently, from 1964 to 1966, he was appointed head of TV7, Rai's weekly news and lifestyle program, on Ettore Bernabei television network, and received two professional awards: the Saint Vincent for television journalism and, in Milan, the Bagutta for “journalist of the month.”

In 1968, he achieved success as a television personality with the program Faccia a faccia, which he created and hosted. Millions of viewers confirm the success of the program in which, for the first time, the public is invited to interact live with national politicians, public administrators, distinguished medical directors, and magistrates.

In July 1969, already head of special services, he was called upon to coordinate fiction and news for the program 1969-Niente come prima (Nothing Like Before), a 28-hour non-stop broadcast covering the Moon landing. Meanwhile, he proposes and produces filmed investigations such as Essere diversi (Being Different), on the world of the elderly and the mentally ill, or Gente nel Sud (People in the South), in which he revisits southern Italy in four episodes, drawing on the work and studies of great southern Italian scholars: from Guido Dorso to Gaetano Salvemini, from Giustino Fortunato to Luigi Sturzo.
