= The Lion of Thebes =

- Directed by: Giorgio Ferroni
- Screenplay by: Remigio Del Grosso; Giorgio Ferroni; Andrey De Coligny; Jean Velter
- Story by: Andrey de Coligny
- Produced by: Diego Alchimede
- Starring: Mark Forest; Yvonne Furneaux; Massimo Serato
- Cinematography: Angelo Lotti
- Edited by: Antonietta Zita
- Music by: Francesco De Masi
- Production companies: Filmes; La Societe des Films Sirius
- Distributed by: Variety Distribution
- Release date: 28 June 1964 (Italy)
- Running time: 88 minutes
- Countries: Italy; France

The Lion of Thebes (Italian: Il leone di Tebe, French: Hélène, reine de Troie) is a peplum film written and directed by Giorgio Ferroni.

== Plot ==
When the Greek army conquers Troy, Helen is exiled from the city. Her loyal guard Arion and Helene ends up shipwrecked on the shores of Egypt, they meet a caravan in the desert and escape from them to Thebes. In the Egyptian city, the Pharaoh Ramses falls in love with Helen, and this ends up making her numerous enemies during her stay in Egypt. She ends up being blamed for the assassination of Ramses, and its up to Arion to save her from those who wish to harm her.

== Cast ==
- Mark Forest as Arion
- Yvonne Furneaux as Helen of Troy
- Massimo Serato as Tutmes
- Pierre Cressoy as Ramses
- Alberto Lupo as Menelao
- Nerio Bernardi as Xesostus
- Rosalba Neri as Nais
- Carlo Tamberlani as Amenofis
- Nello Pazzafini as Gaor
- Tullio Altamura as Elnà
- Enzo Fiermonte as Tutmès' henchman

== Production ==
The film was shot at the De Paolis studios in Rome.

== Release ==
The Lion of Thebes was released in Italy with an 88 minute running time on June 28, 1964. It was released in 1965 in the United States.
