= Marilù Tolo =

Italian actress (born 1944)

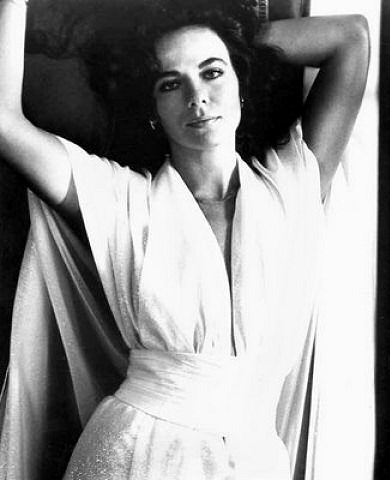
- Born: Maria Lucia Tolo; 16 January 1944 (age 82); Rome, Italy
- Occupation: Actress
- Years active: 1960–1985

Marilù Tolo (born Maria Lucia Tolo; 16 January 1944) is an Italian film actress. She appeared in more than 60 films between 1960 and 1985.

== Life and career ==
Tolo was born in Rome, and at a very young age worked as an assistant of Mario Riva in the RAI variety show Il Musichiere. She made her film debut at 16 years old in Alberto Lattuada's Sweet Deceptions.

Tolo was among the shortlisted actresses who performed screen tests for the supporting antagonistic role of Ursa in Superman (1978), a role which she narrowly lost out on to Sarah Douglas. The screen tests were released as a special feature on the 2001 DVD home video re-release of the film.

She was also a fashion model, and a close friend of Italian stylist Valentino. Valentino said in an interview to Italian newspaper La Repubblica that Tolo was the only woman he had ever really loved and that he had proposed to her in the early 1960s, but was turned down.

== Selected filmography ==
- Howlers in the Dock (1960) - Marilù
- I piaceri del sabato notte (1960) - La sartina - l'amante di Luigi
- Colossus and the Amazon Queen (1960) - Amazzone
- Sweet Deceptions (1960) - Margherita
- Le ambiziose (1961)
- Shéhérazade (1963) - Shirin
- Adultero lui, adultera lei (1963) - Lina
- The Terror of Rome Against the Son of Hercules (1964) - Olympia
- Messalina vs. the Son of Hercules (1964) - Ena
- The Triumph of Hercules (1964) - Princess Ate
- Marriage Italian Style (1964) - Diana the cashier
- The Magnificent Gladiator (1964) - Velida, Galienus' Daughter
- La Celestina P... R... (1965) - Silvana
- Le Chant du monde (1965) - Gina
- Juliet of the Spirits (1965) - TV Presenter (uncredited)
- Espionage in Lisbon (1965) - Terry Brown, 077's partner
- Una ráfaga de plomo (1965) - Yasmin
- Night of Violence (1965) - Sister of Carla Pratesi
- Balearic Caper (1966) - Sofia
- The Poppy Is Also a Flower (1966) - Sophia Banzo
- Your Money or Your Life (1966) - Violette
- To Skin a Spy (1966) - Anna
- Kiss the Girls and Make Them Die (1966) - Gioia
- Perry Grant, agente di ferro (1966) - Paola Kuriel
- Judoka-Secret Agent (1966) - Vanessa
- The Witches (1967) - Waitress (segment "Strega Bruciata Viva, La")
- Sept hommes et une garce (1967) - Carlotta
- The Oldest Profession (1967) - Marlene, Miss Physical Love (segment "Anticipation, ou l'amour en l'an 2000") (as Marilu Tolo)
- Django Kill... If You Live, Shoot! (1967) - Flory
- Casse-tête chinois pour le judoka (1967) - Jennifer
- The Killer Likes Candy (1968) - Sylva
- A Stroke of 1000 Millions (1968) - Prinzi
- Commandos (1968) - Adriana
- Candy (1968) - Conchita
- I dannati della Terra (1969) - Adriana
- Las trompetas del apocalipsis (1969) - Helen Becker
- Kill the Fatted Calf and Roast It (1970) - Verde
- Un été sauvage (1970)
- Roy Colt and Winchester Jack (1970) - Manila
- Gradiva (1970)
- Confessions of a Police Captain (1971) - Serena Li Puma
- Romance of a Horsethief (1971) - Manka
- The Double (1971) - Marie
- Eneide (1971) - Venus
- Long Live Your Death (1971) - Lupita
- We Are All in Temporary Liberty (1971) - Emilia - wife of Langellone
- My Dear Killer (1972) - Dr. Anna Borgese
- Shadows Unseen (1972) - Simona
- Bluebeard (1972) - Brigitt
- Jus primae noctis (1972) - Venerata
- Meo Patacca (1972) - Sora Nuccia
- Themroc (1973) - La secrétaire
- The Five Days aka Le Cinque Giornate (1973) - The Countess
- Riot in a Women's Prison (1974) - Susan
- Il trafficone (1974) - Rosalia / Macaluso's Wife
- Au-delà de la peur (1975) - Nicole
- Cours après moi que je t'attrape (1976) - Anita
- The Greek Tycoon (1978) - Sophia Matalas
- The Sleep of Death (1980) - Countess Elga
- Scorpion with Two Tails (1982) - Contessa Maria Volumna
- Marco Polo (1982, TV Mini-Series) - Donna Fiammetta
- Vacanze di Natale (1983) - Grazia Tassoni
- Il tassinaro (1983) - Fernanda
- The Last Days of Pompeii (1984, TV Mini-Series) - Xenia
- Sogni e bisogni (1985) - Wanda de Amicis
