= Silverio Blasi =

Italian television and stage director, actor and screenwriter

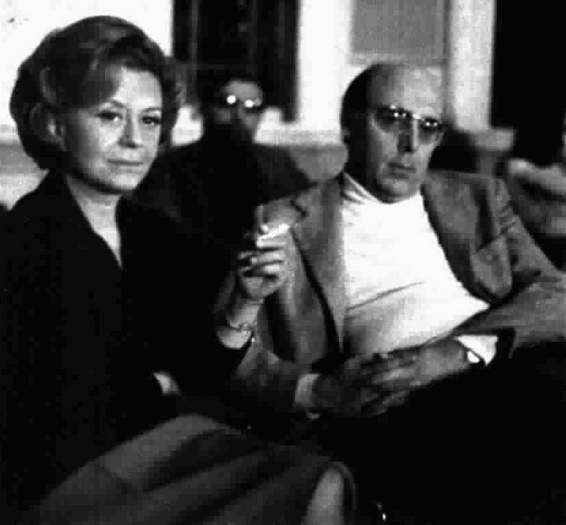
- Giulietta Masina and Silverio Blasi, 1973
- Born: 17 November 1921; Rome, Italy
- Died: 27 April 1995 (aged 73); Rome, Italy

Silverio Blasi (17 November 1921 – 27 April 1995) was an Italian television and stage director, actor and screenwriter.

Born in Rome, Blasi was co-founder, together with Giorgio De Lullo, Goliarda Sapienza and Mario Landi, of the avant-garge theater company "T. 45". After several collaborations with Anton Giulio Bragaglia, in 1954 Blasi started a long collaboration with RAI, for which he write and directed a large number of miniseries and television films.

Blasi was also an occasional film actor, mostly cast in character roles in art films.
