= Hercules the Invincible =

- Directed by: Alvaro Mancori; Lewis Mann
- Written by: Pat Kein (writer); Alvaro Mancori (screenplay); Kirk Mayer (writer)
- Produced by: Alvaro Mancori
- Starring: Dan Vadis, Spela Rozin
- Cinematography: Claude Haroy
- Edited by: Frank Robertson
- Music by: Francesco De Masi
- Release date: 19 March 1964 (Italy)
- Running time: 85 minutes
- Country: Italy
- Language: Italian

Hercules the Invincible (Italian: Ercole l'invincibile) is a 1964 Italian Sword and Sandal film directed by Alvaro Mancori and Lewis Mann and starring Dan Vadis. It is the first of two directing credits for cinematographer Alvaro Mancori.

The film was later released to American television retitled Son of Hercules in the Land of Darkness as part of the Sons of Hercules TV syndication package.

== Plot ==
Hercules saves a woman named Telca from a lion and arrives in triumph in her village. Telca's father King Tedaeo offers Hercules Telca's hand in marriage, if he brings back the tooth of a dragon. Hercules seeks help from a witch who gives him a spear that will kill the dragon but wants the same tooth as her reward. As Hercules has promised the tooth to King Tedaeo the witch warns him that the magic of the tooth will only work once.

In Hercules' absence Telca's village has been pillaged and all the survivors –save Babar, the comedy relief – are taken as prisoners to the Demulus, a tribe that lives inside a mountain and eats the hearts of their prisoners.

== Cast ==
- Dan Vadis as Ercole (Argolese)
- Spela Rozin as Telca
- Carla Calò as Ella, Queen of the Demulus
- Ken Clark as Kabol, Melissia's Father
- Jon Simons as Babar
- Maria Fiore (billed as Jannette Barton) as Etel
- Ugo Sasso as King Tedaeo, Telca's Father
- Howard Ross as Telca's Brother
- Olga Solbelli as The Oracle
- Alberto Cevenini as Capt. of the Guard
- Rosemarie Lindt as Slave Girl
- Kriss Moss as Guard
- Jannette Le Roy as Slave Girl
- Sara Laurier as Slave Girl
- Christine Mathius as Slave Girl

== Reception ==
From contemporary reviews, an anonymous review in The Monthly Film Bulletin noted that "the sloth-like hero belongs to the more dim-witted school of muscle-men, so that it takes a companion, in the shape of a comically cowardly assistant to demonstrate by contrast the heroic stature of Hercules." The review noted "there is some modestly colourful spectacle in the scenes of the underground city and its destruction by lava."
