= Umberto Raho =

Italian actor (1922–2016)

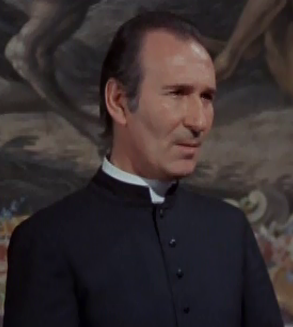
- Raho in When Love Is Lust (1973)
- Born: 4 June 1922; Bari, Italy
- Died: 9 January 2016 (aged 93); Anzio, Italy
- Occupation: Actor
- Years active: 1948–1999

Umberto Raho (4 June 1922 – 9 January 2016) was an Italian stage, film and television actor.

== Life and career ==
Born in Bari, the son of an Italian father and a Bulgarian mother, Raho graduated in philosophy and then, immediately after the war, he debuted on stage. While theater was his main activity, Raho was also a very prolific film character actor, with over one hundred credits starting from 1948. He was also active in television films and series.

== Death ==
Raho died on 9 January 2016 in Anzio, Italy, at the age of 93.

== Selected filmography ==
- Fantasmi del mare (1948) - Sottocapo Luigi Serra
- Queen of the Nile (1961) - Zeton, Priest
- Duel of Champions (1961) - Grand Priest
- Gold of Rome (1961) - Rabbi Beniamino
- A Difficult Life (1961) - Collaborator of the publisher (uncredited)
- Charge of the Black Lancers (1962) - Un Altro Membro del Consiglio
- Seven Seas to Calais (1962) - King Philip of Spain
- Imperial Venus (1962) - Kerversau
- The Verona Trial (1963) - Don Giuseppe Chiot - priest
- The Ghost (1963) - Canon Owens
- Gidget Goes to Rome (1963) - Mario, the Waiter (uncredited)
- The Cardinal (1963) - Priest (uncredited)
- La ballata dei mariti (1963) - Hanoi
- The Betrothed (1964) - Padre Cristoforo
- Castle of Blood (1964) - Lord Thomas Blackwood
- The Last Man on Earth (1964) - Dr. Mercer
- The Visit (1964) - (uncredited)
- Romeo and Juliet (1964) - Friar Lawrence
- I gemelli del Texas (1964) - Mike
- Heroes of Fort Worth (1964) - Col. Maxfield
- Genoveffa di Brabante (1964)
- The Long Hair of Death (1964) - Von Klage, the Priest
- Senza sole né luna' (1964) - Padula
- Darling (1965) - Palucci
- That Man in Istanbul (1965) - Prof. Pendergast (uncredited)
- Agent 077: Mission Bloody Mary (1965) - Prof. Betz
- Doc, Hands of Steel (1965) - Mayor Brogas
- Operation Counterspy (1965) - Von Bliss
- Password: Kill Agent Gordon (1966) - Tourist in Paris
- Wild, Wild Planet (1966) - General Maitland
- War of the Planets (1966) - General Maitland
- Agente segreto 777 - Invito ad uccidere (1966) - Linus Jericho
- Rififi in Amsterdam (1966) - Vladek
- Special Code: Assignment Lost Formula (1966) - Vasili
- My Name Is Pecos (1966) - Morton
- Wanted (1967) - Concho Diaz (uncredited)
- Pecos Cleans Up (1967) - Pinto
- Avenger X (1967) - Jack MacDougall
- Top Secret (1967) - Giorgio
- Domani non siamo più qui (1967) - Rico
- Every Man Is My Enemy (1967) - Trafficante di morfina
- On My Way to the Crusades, I Met a Girl Who... (1967) - Preaching priest
- Halleluja for Django (1967) - Smolie
- Bang Bang Kid (1967) - Rev. Garrett Emerson Langry (uncredited)
- 15 Scaffolds for a Murderer (1967) - Doctor
- The Killer Likes Candy (1968) - Dottore
- Satanik (1968) - George Van Donen
- Madigan's Millions (1968) - Photographer
- The Last Chance (1968) - Carlo
- Diary of a Schizophrenic Girl (1968) - Mr. Zeno
- The Cats (1968) - Doctor
- Colpo sensazionale al servizio del Sifar (1968) - Police Commissioner
- Stuntman (1968) - Insurance company president
- Il ragazzo che sorride (1969) - Scholler
- Hour X Suicide Patrol (1969) - Father Francisco
- Giacomo Casanova: Childhood and Adolescence (1969) - Il vescovo
- ...e vennero in quattro per uccidere Sartana! (1969) - Von Krassel
- The Bird with the Crystal Plumage (1970) - Alberto Ranieri
- Disperatamente l'estate scorsa (1970)
- The Confession (1970) - Jaretzki
- A Girl Called Jules (1970) - Confessore
- Fermate il mondo... voglio scendere! (1970) - Man at party
- The Cat o' Nine Tails (1971) - Manuel's Ex-Lover
- Four Gunmen of the Holy Trinity (1971) - Quinn Paradine
- Bella di giorno moglie di notte (1971)
- The Night Evelyn Came Out of the Grave (1971) - Farley
- Oasis of Fear (1971) - Police Inspector
- Drummer of Vengeance (1971) - Mayor
- La stirpe di Caino (1971)
- We Are All in Temporary Liberty (1971) - Di Meo
- Amuck! (1972) - Giovanni - the butler
- The Night of the Devils (1972) - Dr. Tosi
- The Summertime Killer (1972) - Louie
- Baron Blood (1972) - Inspector (as Humi Raho on US prints)
- Valerie Inside Outside (1972) - Psychiatrist
- Crimes of the Black Cat (1972) - Burton
- Il terrore con gli occhi storti (1972) - Jean-Pierre, assassino
- The Assassin of Rome (1972) - Questore Angelini
- Al tropico del cancro (1972) - Philip
- L'altro piatto della bilancia (1972)
- Lady Dynamite (1973) - Vito Spezzino
- My Pleasure Is Your Pleasure (1973) - Il tesoriere del granduca
- When Love Is Lust (1973) - Don Claudio
- Women in Cell Block 7 (1973) - Daniela's lawyer
- No, the Case Is Happily Resolved (1973) - Don Giulio - Priest
- The Sibyl Cipher (1973) - Barutti
- The Flower with the Petals of Steel (1973) - Psychiatrist
- Anna, quel particolare piacere (1973) - Sogliani's lawyer
- Buona parte di Paolina (1973)
- Bread and Chocolate (1974) - Jacques, il Maitre
- Last Days of Mussolini (1974) - Guido Leto
- Lo strano ricatto di una ragazza perbene (1974) - Mr. Herman Stone
- Prostituzione (1974) - Blackmail victim
- Verdict (1974) - Le médecin légiste
- The Eerie Midnight Horror Show (1974) - Psychiatrist
- Conversation Piece (1974) - Commissario
- Faccia di spia (1975)
- Der zweite Frühling (1975) - Antonio
- Hallucination Strip (1975) - Giovanni - il cameriere
- Extra (1976, TV Mini-Series) - Gen. Stove
- L'année sainte (1976) - Le consul
- Nick the Sting (1976) - Insurance Director
- Free Hand for a Tough Cop (1976) - Franco (uncredited)
- Un amore targato Forlì (1976)
- L'inconveniente (1976)
- Casanova & Co. (1977) - Doge
- Antonio Gramsci: The Days of Prison (1977) - Il cappellano
- Hot Potato (1979) - Il dottore
- La zia di Monica (1980) - Priest
- Buona come il pane (1982) - English Teacher
- The Secret of Seagull Island (1982) - Doctor
- La Cage aux Folles 3: The Wedding (1985) - Kennedy
- The Moro Affair (1986) - Customhouse Officer
- Aladdin (1986) - Police Chief
- The Messenger (1986) - Palmiero
- Crazy Underwear (1992) - Minister Poletti (uncredited)
- The Blonde (1993)
- Double Team (1997) - Brother Regulo
