= The Devil's Man =

- Directed by: Paolo Bianchini
- Screenplay by: Paul Maxwell; Max Caret
- Story by: Paul Maxwell; Max Caret
- Starring: Guy Madison; Luisa Baratto; Luciano Pigozzi; Diana Lorys
- Cinematography: Aldo Greci
- Edited by: Constance Elliot
- Music by: Patrick Leguy
- Production company: Lion International
- Release date: 1967 (Italy)
- Country: Italy

The Devil's Man (Italian: Devilman Story) is a 1967 Italian science fiction film directed by Paolo Bianchini.

== Plot ==
Journalist Mike Harway decides to help his friend Christine Becker in her search for her father, professor Baker. Her father, a leading brain specialist, is in Rome for a conference but has mysteriously disappeared. After some time, their investigation brings them to Africa. While in Africa, as they are traversing a desert, they are captured by nomads and brought to the abandoned fort at El Faiu. Within the fort is a hidden laboratory designed by the twisted mind of Devilman. Devilman dreams of swapping his natural brain with an artificial one that he believes will make him perfect. Mike, Christine and Professor Baker make a desperate attempt to escape from the fortress before the transfer occurs. They are rescued by an army of Moors.

== Cast ==
- Guy Madison as Mike Harway
- Luisa Baratto as Christine Becker
- Alan Collins as Kew
- Diana Lorys as Yasmin
- Giovanni Cianfriglia as The Professor

== Production ==
The Devil's Man was the first of three films director Paolo Bianchini directed for producer Gabriele Crisanti. Crisanti stated that the film was designed to recover costs and recycle scenes from his other production I predoni del Sahara (1965) directed by Guido Malatesta. Bianchini was allowed a lot of freedom while making the film, stating that Crisanti had already sold the title of the film and as long as he used footage he had of the riders from the previous film.

== Style ==
Film historian Roberto Curti noted that the film is often misleadingly described as a spy film. Curti described it as mixture of "adventure, mystery and science fiction" that was closer to 1930s and 1940s American film serials.

== Reception ==
In a contemporary review, the Monthly Film Bulletin declared the film as a "routine formula of the power-crazed scientist whose manic schemes are thwarted by an inevitable final holocaust" while noting that the film had "some splendid desert locations and some "austere chrome and glass SF sets."

Paolo Bianchini spoke negatively about the production and the film, stating that "Guy Madison was the only one who took the whole thing seriously. It was such crap!" In Phil Hardy's book Science Fiction, The Devil's Man was referred to as a "routine mad scientist offering. The plot is so traditional that it wouldn't have been out of place in a thirties serial" The review praised the sets of the film, specifically Devilman's secret laboratory noting that "as is so often the case in Italian science fiction films of the sixties, are delightfully futuristic."

TV Guide gave the movie one out of five stars.

== See also ==
- List of Italian films of 1967
