= Magda Konopka =

Polish model and actress (born 1939)

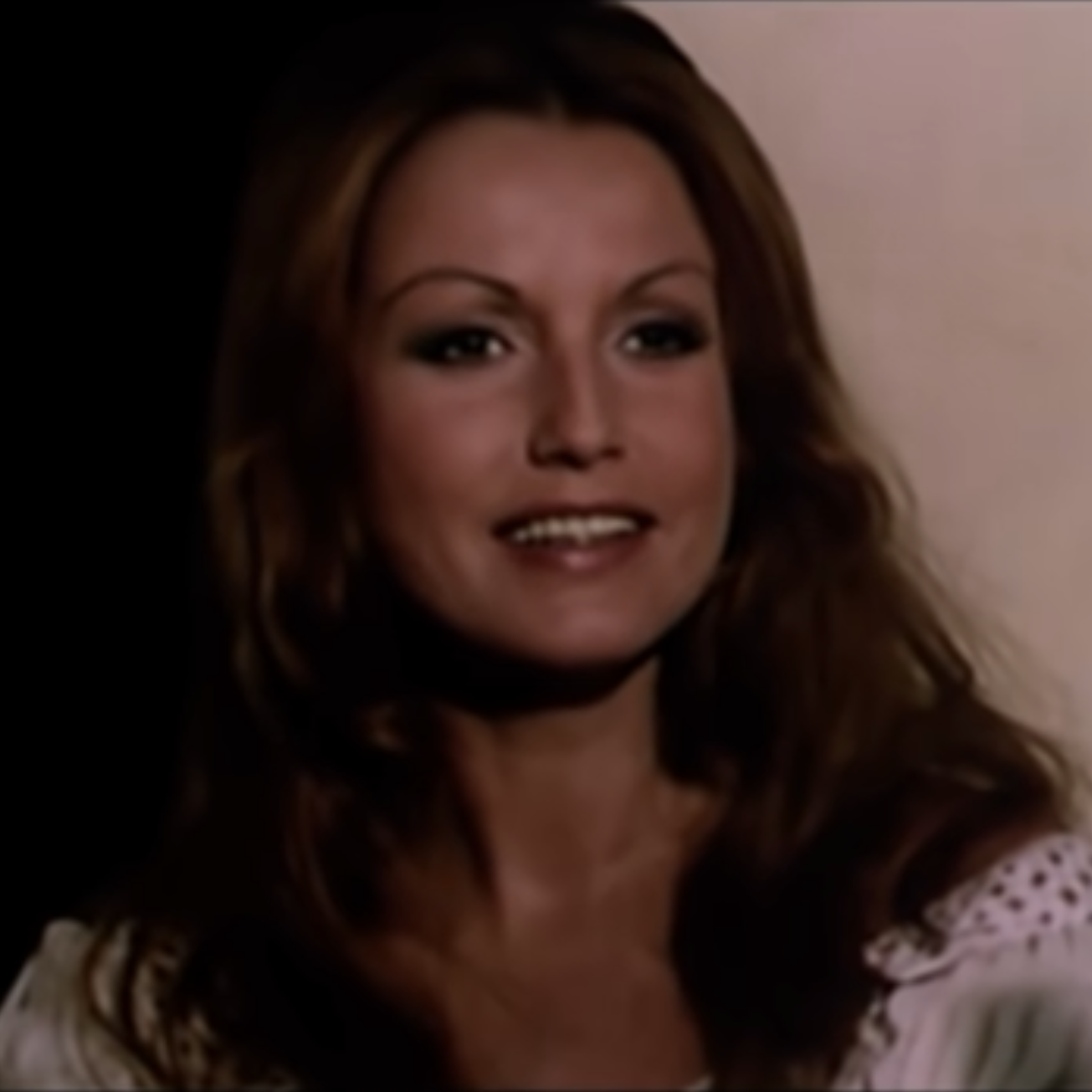
- Born: 15 March 1943 (age 83); Warsaw, Poland
- Other name: Małgorzata Magda Kołączkowska
- Occupations: Actress, model

Magda Konopka (born 15 March 1943) is a Polish model and actress. She was born in Warsaw.

In December 1967, she married a Franco-Canadian billionaire Jean-Louis Dessy in Chelsea, London. They separated after three months of marriage.

She is reported to have been one of the women with whom Sean Connery had affairs in the early 1970s prior to his divorce from Diane Cilento.

On TV she had a leading role in the episode A Fish out of Water (1969) in the classic series Department S.

== Filmography ==
- Becket (1964) (as Magda Knopke)
- Thrilling (1965)
- Sette monaci d'oro (1966)
- Pleasant Nights (1966)
- Golden Chameleon (1967)
- Love Nights in the Taiga (1967)
- Top Secret (1967)
- Satanik (1968)
- A Sky Full of Stars for a Roof (1968)
- Night of the Serpent (1969)
- Hell Boats (1970)
- When Dinosaurs Ruled the Earth (1970)
- Winged Devils (1971)
- Quickly, spari e baci a colazione (1971)
- Blindman (1971)
- Canterbury proibito (1972)
- Loves of a Nymphomaniac (1973)
- Love Angels (1974)
- Lucky Luciano (1974)
- Super Stooges vs. the Wonder Women (1974)
- Vice Wears Black Hose (1975)
- Sex, Demons and Death (1975)
- La Sposina (1976)
- Campagnola bella (1976)
- La Cameriera nera (1976)
- La Zia di Monica (1979)
