= The Ten Gladiators =

Italian film

- Italian theatrical release poster
- Directed by: Gianfranco Parolini
- Screenplay by: Giovanni Simonelli; Sergio Sollima
- Starring: Roger Browne; Jose Greci; Dan Vadis; Franca Parisi
- Cinematography: Francesco Izzarelli
- Edited by: Edmond Lozzi
- Music by: Angelo Francesco Lavagnino
- Production company: Cine-Produzioni Associate
- Release date: 14 December 1963 (Italy)
- Running time: 110 minutes
- Country: Italy

The Ten Gladiators (Italian: I dieci gladiatori) is a 1963 Italian action adventure film, directed by Gianfranco Parolini. The first of the 'Ten Gladiators Trilogy', followed by Triumph of the Ten Gladiators (Italian: Il trionfo dei dieci gladiatori) and Spartacus and the Ten Gladiators (Italian: Gli invincibili dieci gladiatori) in 1964.

== Plot summary ==
Roccia and a band of fellow gladiators join forces with a patrician named Glaucus Valerius in order to replace Nero (and his evil henchman, Tigelinus), with a new emperor: Servius Galba. During the course of this bloody struggle, the gladiators lose their mentor and trainer - Resius - and then must rescue Lidia, Resius' beautiful niece, from death by crucifixion.

== Cast ==
- Roger Browne as Glaucus Valerius
- José Greci (a.k.a. Susan Paget) as Lidia
- Dan Vadis as Roccia
- Franca Parisi (a.k.a. Margaret Taylor) as Poppea
- Gianni Rizzo as Claudius Nero
- Mimmo Palmara (aka Dick Palmer) as Tigelinus
- Ugo Sasso as Resius
- Mirko Ellis as Servius Galba
- Gianfranco Parolini as Livius Verus
- Vassili Karis as Epaphrodito
- Emilio Messina as Gladiator Leptus
- Giuseppe Mattei (aka Pino Mattei) as Gladiator Methodius
- Pietro Torrisi as Gladiator
- Aldo Canti as Gladiator
- Giancarlo Bastianoni as Gladiator
- Giuliano Dell'Ovo as Gladiator
- Gino Turini (a.k.a. John Turner) as Gladiator
- Romano Giomini as Gladiator
- Ivano Staccioli as Gladiator
- Roberto Messina as Gladiator
- Milton Reid as Bald Wrestler
- Salvatore Borghese as Milo / Minius, the Mute
- Arnaldo Fabrizio as Glaucus' Little Servant
- Veriano Ginesi as Geriel, the Ship's Drummer

== Release ==
The Ten Gladiators was released in Italy on 14 December 1963 with a 110-minute running time as I dieci gladiatori. On its American release, the film had a running time of 104 minutes.
