= The Magnificent Gladiator =

- Directed by: Alfonso Brescia
- Screenplay by: Alfonso Brescia
- Produced by: Anacleto Fontini
- Starring: Mark Forest; Marilu Tolo; Paolo Gozlino; Jolanda Modio
- Cinematography: Pier Ludovico Pavoni
- Edited by: Nelle Nannuzzi
- Music by: Marcello Giombini
- Production company: Seven Film
- Release date: 31 December 1964 (Italy)
- Running time: 95 minutes
- Country: Italy
- Language: Italian

The Magnificent Gladiator (Italian: Il magnifico gladiatore) is a 1964 Italian sword-and-sandal film written and directed by Alfonso Brescia.

== Plot ==
Attalus (or anachronistically "Hercules" in the English version) is captured by Roman soldiers on the frontier during the reign of Gallienus (AD 253–268). Attalus is brought back to Rome and forced to fight in the arena as a gladiator, but once there, he becomes embroiled in a plot to overthrow the emperor.

== Cast ==
- Mark Forest as Attalus
- Marilù Tolo as Velida
- Paolo Gozlino as Zullo
- Jolanda Modio as Clea
- Franco Cobianchi as Gallienus
- Oreste Lionello as Drusius
- Nazzareno Zamperla as Horatius
- Fedele Gentile as Arminius
- Giulio Tomei
- Renato Montalbano

== Release ==
The Magnificent Gladiator was released in Italy on 31 December 1964.

== See also ==
- List of historical drama films
- Gallienus usurpers

== Notes ==
=== References ===
- Kinnard, Roy; Crnkovich, Tony (2017). Italian Sword and Sandal Films, 1908-1990. McFarland. ISBN 978-1476662916.
