= Hercules Against the Sons of the Sun =

- Directed by: Osvaldo Civirani
- Screenplay by: Franco Tannozzini; Osvaldo Civirani
- Produced by: Osvaldo Civirani
- Starring: Mark Forest; Anna Maria Pace; Giuliano Gemma
- Cinematography: Julio Ortas Plaza
- Edited by: Nella Nannuzzi
- Music by: Lallo Gori
- Production companies: Wonder Film; Hispamer
- Release date: 1964
- Running time: 89 minutes
- Countries: Italy; Spain

Hercules Against the Sons of the Sun (Italian: Ercole contro i figli del sole, Spanish: Hércules contra los hijos del Sol, also known as Hercules Vs. the Sons of the Sun) is a 1964 Italian-Spanish peplum film written and directed by Osvaldo Civirani.

== Cast ==
- Mark Forest as Hercules
- Anna Maria Pace as Yamira
- Giuliano Gemma as Maytha
- Giulio Donnini as the High Priest
- Franco Fantasia as King Ata Hualpa
- Angela Rhu as the Queen
- Assia Zezon as the Handmaiden
- Audrey Anderson as the Dancing Girl
- Rosalba Neri as the Queen (uncredited)

== Plot ==
Hercules (Forest) is shipwrecked in the land of the Incas after a month-long storm that drove his ship across the Great Ocean, which he believes occurred because the crew somehow angered the god Neptune. The only survivor, Hercules is attacked upon awakening on the beach by Inca warriors, but these are slain by Inca rebel archers under the command of Prince Maytha (Gemma), son of the rightful Inca King who has been usurped and imprisoned by his own brother, Ata Hualpa (Fantasia), as has Maytha's sister, Princess Yamira (Pace). Hercules helps the rebels rescue Yamira just as she is to be sacrificed and then shows the rebels how to build siege engines to attack the palace and overthrow the usurper. Though Maytha earlier promised to help Hercules build a ship to return to his home, at the end the Greek hero embraces Princess Yamira.

== Reception ==
A review in the Monthly Film Bulletin described the film as a "decorative film" that was "often pleasant to watch, with attractive outdoor locations featuring the most viridian of luxuriant foliage." and "an array of spectacular costumes" concluding that "its decorative virtues are the film's only strong point: it is totally lacking in vitality, and the stiff acting is not improved by equally stiff dubbing".

== See also ==
- List of films featuring Hercules
