= La amante estelar =

La amante estelar is a 1968 37-minute Spanish film directed by Antonio de Lara, based on a novel by William S. Stewart. It stars Elena Arnao, Claudia Cardinale, and Pedro Costa. The film was produced by Escuela Oficial de Cinematografía.
