= Paolo Bianchini =

Italian film director and screenwriter

- Born: 1931 (age 93–94); Rome, Italy
- Occupation: Film director

Paolo Bianchini (born 1931) is an Italian director and screenwriter.

== Life and career ==
Born in Rome, Bianchini began his career in 1953 working as assistant director of a number of notable directors, including Mario Monicelli, Luigi Comencini, Vittorio De Sica, Mauro Bolognini and particularly Luigi Zampa, with whom he collaborated several times. From the second half of the 1960 Bianchini was also active as a director and a screenwriter, specializing in low-budget genre films. Starting from the 1970s he focused his work on television and advertising commercials.

== Selected filmography ==
- Our Men in Bagdad (1966)
- Massacre Mania (1967)
- The Devil's Man (1967)
- Superargo and the Faceless Giants (1968)
- I Want Him Dead (1968)
- God Made Them... I Kill Them (1968)
- Gatling Gun (1968)
- Hey Amigo! A Toast to Your Death (1970)
