= Spartacus and the Ten Gladiators =

- Theatrical release poster
- Directed by: Nick Nostro
- Screenplay by: Sergio Solima; Nick Nostro; Alfonso Balcázar
- Produced by: Amando Morandi
- Starring: Dan Vadis; Helga Liné; Ivano Staccioli; Alfredo Varelli
- Cinematography: Tino Santoni
- Edited by: Bruno Mattei
- Music by: Carlo Savina
- Production companies: Cine Produzioni Associate; Les Films Copernic; Balcazar Producciones Cinematograficas
- Release date: 24 December 1964 (Italy)
- Running time: 88 minutes
- Countries: Italy; France; Spain

Spartacus and the Ten Gladiators (Italian: Gli invincibili dieci gladiatori) is a 1964 international co-production sword-and-sandal film directed by Nick Nostro and co-written by Nostro, Alfonso Balcázar and Sergio Sollima.

== Plot ==
Rocca and his nine gladiators have just completed a triumphal show in the arena in front of the Emperor. However their ebullient mood changes to horror and sadness when they are followed by a group of a dozen gladiators from Thrace who are ordered to kill each other until one man is standing. In this group is a father and son. They reluctantly comply but when the son faces his father one of the gladiators steps in to prevent the son from killing his father then throws his sword at the Emperor's box.

The show is stopped with the manager flogging the defiant gladiator without effect until he is stopped by Rocca. A man named Chimbro offers to buy the survivors for his own use and mollifies the manager by not only the price paid but promising that they will suffer lifelong torment instead of an easy death. The manager takes his anger out on Rocca and his men by blacklisting them from ever appearing in an arena again.

The hungry gladiators travel through the countryside where they stop an attack by bandits on a group carrying the Patrician woman Livia who promises her rescuers a reward from her wealthy father. They are dismayed when their announcement that several of Lydia's slaves are mortally wounded is met by Livia reassuring them there is nothing to worry about; she has more slaves where they come from.

Over dinner at the villa of her father Senator Varro, Varro offers Rocca and his men the opportunity to perform in any venue they wish. Chimbro arrives to tell Varro that he is unsuccessful in capturing the elusive Spartacus who Varro claims is behind various raids and depredations in the area, though in reality it is Chimbro leading men of Varro's private army disguised as bandits who are responsible. Rocca and his men offer to capture Spartacus and bring him to justice, with Varro believing that the ten have the capability that Chimbro and his 50 soldiers did not.

A reconnaissance and raid on Spartacus' camp lead to the entire camp defending Spartacus who is revealed to be the gladiator who stopped the son from killing his father, threatened the Emperor, and escaped from Chimbro. Rocca and his men offer to make an offer from Spartacus that he will pay the ransom of him and all his escaped slaves to Varro once they escape from Rome by sea, but the treacherous Varro imprisons Rocca and his men and raids the camp of Spartacus. Rocca and his men escape and plan vengeance to Varro and loyalty to Spartacus.

== Cast ==
- Dan Vadis – Rocca
- Helga Liné – Daliah
- Alfredo Varelli – Spartacus
- Ursula Davis – Livia
- Gianni Rizzo – Senator Varro
- Enzo Fiermonte – Gladiator Rizio
- Salvatore Borghese – Mute Gladiator
- Milton Reid – Chimbro
- Aldo Canti – Thracian son
- Ivano Staccioli

== Production ==
The film was shot in Rome and on location in Barcelona, Spain.

== Release ==
Spartacus and the Ten Gladiators was released in Italy on 24 March 1964.

== Notes ==
=== References ===
- Kinnard, Roy; Crnkovich, Tony (2017). Italian Sword and Sandal Films, 1908-1990. McFarland. ISBN 978-1476662916.
