= List of Italian films of 1960 =

A list of films produced in Italy in 1960 (see 1960 in film):

Italian film productions released in 1960
Title	Director	Cast	Genre	Notes
5 Branded Women	Martin Ritt	Silvana Mangano, Vera Miles, Barbara Bel Geddes	Melodrama	Italian-American co-production
Adua and Friends	Antonio Pietrangeli	Simone Signoret, Gina Rovere, Sandra Milo	Comedy-drama	
The Angel Wore Red	Nunnally Johnson	Ava Gardner, Dirk Bogarde, Joseph Cotten	Drama, romance, war	Italian-American co-production
Anonima cocottes	Camillo Mastrocinque	Renato Rascel, Anita Ekberg	Comedy	Italian-French co-production
Apocalisse sul fiume giallo	Renzo Merusi	Claudio Biava, Anita Ekberg	War, drama	
Assignment: Outer Space	Antonio Margheriti	Rick van Nutter, Gabriella Farinon, Dave Montressor	Science fiction	
Atom Age Vampire	Anton Giulio Majano	Alberto Lupo, Susanne Loret, Sergio Fantoni	Horror	
L'Avventura	Michelangelo Antonioni	Gabriele Ferzetti, Monica Vitti, Lea Massari	Drama	Italian-French co-production
Appuntamento a Ischia	Mario Mattoli	Domenico Modugno, Antonella Lualdi, Franco and Ciccio	Comedy	
Appuntamento in paradiso	Giuseppe Rolando	Non professional actors	Religious, for children	
Austerlitz	Abel Gance	Pierre Mondy, Rossano Brazzi, Claudia Cardinale	Epic	French-Italian-Yugoslavian co-production
I baccanali di Tiberio	Giorgio Simnelli	Walter Chiari, Ugo Tognazzi, Abbe Lane	Comedy	
Bambini nell'acquedotto	Giuseppe Ferrara	—N/a	Documentary	
Il bell'Antonio	Mauro Bolognini	Marcello Mastroianni, Claudia Cardinale, Pierre Brasseur	Comedy-drama	Italian-French co-production
Blood and Roses	Roger Vadim	Mel Ferrer, Elsa Martinelli, Annette Vadim	Horror	French-Italian co-production
Black Sunday	Mario Bava	Barbara Steele, John Richardson, Ivo Garrani	Horror	
Les Bonnes Femmes	Claude Chabrol	Bernadette Lafont, Clotilde Joano, Lucile Saint-Simon	Drama	French-Italian co-production
Caccia al marito	Marino Girolami	Sandra Mondaini, Lorella De Luca, Valeria Fabrizi	Comedy	
Call Girls of Rome	Daniele D'Anza	Andreina Pagnani, Scilla Gabel, Romolo Valii	Drama	
Captain Blood	André Hunebelle	Jean Marais, Bourvil, Elsa Martinelli	Adventure	French-Italian co-production
Caravan petrol	Mario Amendola	Nino Taranto, Renato Carosone	Comedy	
Cartagine in fiamme	Carmine Gallone	Pierre Brasseur, Daniel Gelin, Anne Heywood	Peplum	French-Italian co-production
Cavalcata selvaggia	Piero Pierotti	Massimo Girotti, Franca Bettoja, Saro Urzì	Adventure	
Ceneri della memoria	Alberto Caldana		Documentary	
Centomila leghe nello spazio	Marcello Baldi		Cartoon, Documentary	
Chi si ferma è perduto	Sergio Corbucci	Totò, Peppino De Filippo, Alberto Lionello	Comedy	
Chiamate 22-22 tenente Sheridan	Giorgio Bianchi	Ubaldo Lay, Umberto Orsini	Mystery	
Classe tous risques	Claude Sautet	Lino Ventura, Sandra Milo	Crime	French-Italian co-production
Cleopatra's Daughter	Fernando Cerchio	Debra Paget, Ettore Manni, Erno Crisa	Peplum	
Colossus and the Amazon Queen	Vittorio Sala	Ed Fury, Rod Taylor, Dorian Gray	Action	
The Cossacks	Giorgio Rivalta, Victor Tourjansky	Edmond Purdom, John Drew Barrymore, Giorgia Moll	Adventure	
Crimen				
David and Goliath	Richard Pottier	Orson Welles, Ivo Payer, Edward Hilton	Adventure	
I delfini	Francesco Maselli	Claudia Cardinale, Gérard Blain, Betsy Blair	Drama	
Dialogue of the Carmelites	Philippe Agostini	Jeanne Moreau, Alida Valli, Madeleine Renaud	Historical	French-Italian co-production
La Dolce Vita	Federico Fellini	Marcello Mastroianni, Anita Ekberg, Anouk Aimée	Comedy-drama	Italian-French co-production
È arrivata la parigina	Camillo Mastrocinque	Magali Noel, Titina De Filippo	Comedy	
Escape by Night	Roberto Rossellini	Giovanna Ralli, Renato Salvatori, Leo Genn	Drama	Italian-French co-production
Esther and the King	Raoul Walsh	Joan Collins, Richard Egan, Denis O'Dea	Epic	Italian-American co-production
Everybody Go Home	Luigi Comencini	Alberto Sordi, Martin Balsam, Serge Reggiani	Comedy, war	Italian-French co-production
Eyes Without a Face	Georges Franju	Pierre Brasseur, Alida Valli, Édith Scob	Horror	French-Italian co-production
Femmine di lusso	Giorgio Bianchi	Gino Cervi, Walter Chiari, Ivan Desny	Comedy, romance	
Ferragosto in bikini	Marino Girolami	—N/a	—N/a	
Final Accord	Wolfgang Liebeneiner	Christian Marquand, Eleonora Rossi Drago, Viktor de Kowa	Drama	West-German-Italian-French co-production
Fortunat	Alex Joffé	Bourvil, Michèle Morgan, Gaby Morlay	Drama	French-Italian co-production
Fury of the Pagans	Guido Malatesta	Andrea Fantasia, Livio Lorenzon, Luciano Marin	Adventure, historical film	
Gastone	Mario Bonnard	—N/a	comedy	
Gente dei navigli	—N/a	—N/a	—N/a	
Giovani delfini	—N/a	—N/a	—N/a	
Giovedi: passeggiata	—N/a	—N/a	—N/a	
Goliath and the Dragon	Vittorio Cottafavi	Mark Forest, Broderick Crawford, Sandro Moretti	—N/a	
Heaven on Earth	—N/a	—N/a	—N/a	
The High Life	Julien Duvivier	Giulietta Masina, Gustav Knuth, Gert Fröbe	Drama	West-German-Italian-French co-production
The Hole	Jacques Becker	Michel Constantin, Jean Keraudy, Philippe Leroy	Drama	French-Italian co-production
The Hunchback of Rome	Carlo Lizzani	Gérard Blain, Bernard Blier, Ivo Garrani	Drama, romance	Italian-French co-production
Long Night in 1943	Florestano Vancini	Gabriele Ferzetti, Enrico Maria Salerno	Drama	Venice Award. Military history of Italy during World War II
Sweet Deceptions				
I genitori in Blue-Jeans				
The Giants of Thessaly	Riccardo Freda	Roland Carey, Ziva Rodann, Alberto Farnese	Adventure, fantasy	Italian-French co-production
Il Mattatore	Dino Risi	Vittorio Gassman, Dorian Gray, Anna Maria Ferrero	Comedy	
I mustri				
I piaceri dello scapolo				
I Teddy boys della canzone				
I vecchi				
Il carro armato dell'8 settembre				
Il cavaliere dai cento volti				
Il conquistatore dell'Oriente				
Il corazziere				
Il corsaro della tortue				
Il grande paese d'acciaio				
Il malato immaginario				
Il mattatore				
Il peccato degli anni verdi				
Il principe fusto				
Il puledrino				
Il suffit d'aimer				
Io amo, tu ami				
Italiani all'inferno				
Kapò	Gillo Pontecorvo	Didi Perego, Gianni Garko, Emmanuelle Riva	Drama, war	Italian-French-Yugoslav production
L'airone ha chiuso le ali				
L'Italia non è un paese povero				
L'ours				
La banda del buco				
La casa delle vedove				
La contessa azzurra				
La donna di ghiaccio				
La française et l'amour				
La garçonnière				
La grammatica del fresatore				
La locandiera				
La lunga notte del '43				
La main chaude				
La notte del grande assalto				
La regina dei tartari				
The Revolt of the Slaves	Nunzio Malasomma	Rhonda Fleming, Lang Jeffries, Darío Moreno	—N/a	Italian-Spanish-German co-production
La schiava di Roma			Peplum	
La strada dei giganti				
La suola romana				
Revenge of the Barbarians (La vendetta dei barbari)			Peplum	
La vérité				
Labbra rosse				
Le bal des espions				
Le baron de l'écluse				
Le bois des amants				
Le olimpiadi dei mariti				
Le passage du Rhin				
Le Saint mène la danse				
Le signore				
Le signorine dai cappelli verdi				
Le svedesi				
Le tre eccetera del colonnello				
Les canailles				
Les distractions				
Les Nuits de Raspoutine				
Les Régates de San Francisco				
Les vieux de la vieille				
Lettere di una novizia				
Letto a tre piazze	—N/a	—N/a	—N/a	
Lipstick	Damiano Damiani	Pierre Brice, Giorgia Moll, Pietro Germi	Crime, mystery	Italian-French co-production
Lo schiavo impazzito				
Lo specchio, la tigre e la pianura				
Los dos rivales				
The Loves of Hercules	Carlo Ludovico Bragaglia	Mickey Hargitay, Jayne Mansfield	Fantasy	Italian-French co-production
Luciano – Via dei Cappellari				
Macbeth				
Maciste nella valle dei re			Peplum	
Madri pericolose				
Marie des Isles				
Messalina	Vittorio Cottafavi	Belinda Lee, Spiros Focás. Carlo Giustini	—N/a	
Mill of the Stone Women	Giorgio Ferroni	Pierre Brice, Dany Carrel, Herbert A.E. Boehme	Horror	Italian-French co-production
A Mistress for the Summer	Édouard Molinaro	Pascale Petit, Micheline Presle, Michel Auclair	Comedy	Co-production with France
Mistress of the World – Part 1	William Dieterle	Martha Hyer, Micheline Presle, Carlos Thompson, Lino Ventura	Science fiction	West German-French-Italian co-production
Mistress of the World – Part 2	William Dieterle	Martha Hyer, Carlos Thompson, Wolfgang Preiss	Science fiction	West German-French-Italian co-production
Mobby Jackson				
Moderato cantabile				
Morgan, the Pirate	André De Toth, Primo Zeglio	Steve Reeves, Valérie Lagrange, Lydia Alfonsi	Adventure	Italian-French co-production
My Friend, Dr. Jekyll	Marino Girolami	Ugo Tognazzi, Raimondo Vianello, Abbe Lane	Parody	
Nebbia				
Noi duri				
Os Bandeirantes				
The Pharaohs' Woman	Giorgio Rivalta	John Drew Barrymore, Linda Cristal, Armando Francioli	Adventure, historical film	
Pippo, Briciola e Nuvola Bianca				
Pirates of the Coast	Domenico Paolella	Lex Barker, Estella Blain, Livio Lorenzon	Adventure	Italian-French co-production
The Playgirls and the Vampire	Piero Regnoli	Lyla Rocco, Walter Brandi, Maria Giovannini	Horror	
Po: forza 50.000				
Prigionieri del mare				
The prince in chains	Luis Lucia	Javier Escrivà, Antonio Vilar	Historical	Italian-Spanish coproduction
Purple Noon	René Clément	Alain Delon, Maurice Ronet, Marie Laforêt	Thriller	French-Italian co-production
Quando amor comanda				
Questo amore ai confini del mondo	Giuseppe Maria Scotese	Antonio Cifariello, Dominique Wilms, Fausto Tozzi	Western	Argentinian-Italian co-production
Racconti garibaldini				
Rapina al quartiere Ovest				
Ravissante				
Recours en grâce				
Requiem	—N/a	—N/a	—N/a	
Revak the Rebel	Rudolph Maté	Jack Palance	Peplum	
Risate di gioia				
Ritratto di Pina				
Robin Hood and the Pirates	Giorgio Simonelli	Lex Barker, Jocelyn Lane, Rosanna Rory	—N/a	
Rocco and His Brothers	Luchino Visconti	Alain Delon, Renato Salvatori, Annie Girardot	Drama	Italian-French co-production
Saffo, Venere di Lesbo	Pietro Francisci	Kerwin Mathews, Tina Louise, Riccardo Garrone	Adventure	Italian-French co-production
Salambò				
The Savage Innocents	Nicholas Ray	Anthony Quinn, Yoko Tani, Carlo Giustini	Adventure, drama	Italian-French-British-American co-production
San Remo, la grande sfida				
Seven Days... Seven Nights	Peter Brook	Jean-Paul Belmondo, Didier Haudepin, Jeanne Moreau	Drama	French-Italian co-production
Siege of Syracuse	Pietro Francisci	Rossano Brazzi, Tina Louise, Enrico Maria Salerno	Action, historical film, romance	Italian-French co-production
Signori si nasce	Mario Mattoli	—N/a	—N/a	
Some Like It Cold	Stefano Vanzina	Ugo Tognazzi, Raimondo Vianello	—N/a	
Spade senza bandiera	—N/a	Folco Lulli, Leonora Ruffo	Adventure	
Su e giù per la scala		Claudia Cardinale		
Tartarino di Tarascona				
Tenente Sheridan: Rapina al grattacielo				
Tenente Sheridan: Una gardenia per Helena Carrell				
Tenente Sheridan: Vacanze col gangster				
Terrain vague	Marcel Carné	Danielle Gaubert	Drama	French-Italian co-production
Terrore della maschera rossa				
The Thousand Eyes of Dr. Mabuse	Fritz Lang	Gert Fröbe, Howard Vernon, Bruno W. Pante	Crime	West German-Italian-French co-production
Ti aspetterò all'inferno				
Tomorrow Is My Turn	André Cayatte	Charles Aznavour, Nicole Courcel, Georges Rivière	Drama, war	French-Italian-West German co-production
Toro bravo				
Totò ciak				
Totò, Fabrizi e i giovani d'oggi	Mario Mattoli	Totò, Aldo Fabrizi, Christine Kaufmann	—N/a	
Treno di Natale				
The Truth	Henri-Georges Clouzot	Brigitte Bardot, Charles Vanel, Paul Meurisse	Drama	French-Italian co-production
Tu che ne dici?				
Two Women	Vittorio De Sica	Sophia Loren, Eleonora Brown, Jean-Paul Belmondo	Drama	Italian-French co-production
Un amore a Roma				
Un canto nel deserto				
Un dollaro di fifa				
Un eroe del nostro tempo				
Un mandarino per Teo	—N/a	—N/a	—N/a	
Un militare e mezzo				
Un Oscar per il signor Rossi				
Under Ten Flags	Duilio Coletti	Van Heflin, Charles Laughton, Mylène Demongeot	Drama	Italian-American co-production
Une fille pour l'été				
Urlatori alla sbarra				
Vacanze in Argentina				
The Vampire and the Ballerina	Renato Polselli	Hélène Rémy, Tina Gloriani, Walter Bigari	Horror	
Il Vigile	Luigi Zampa	—N/a	Comedy	
Vita romana				
Ça va être ta fête				
