= Goliath and the Barbarians =

1959 film directed by Carlo Campogalliani

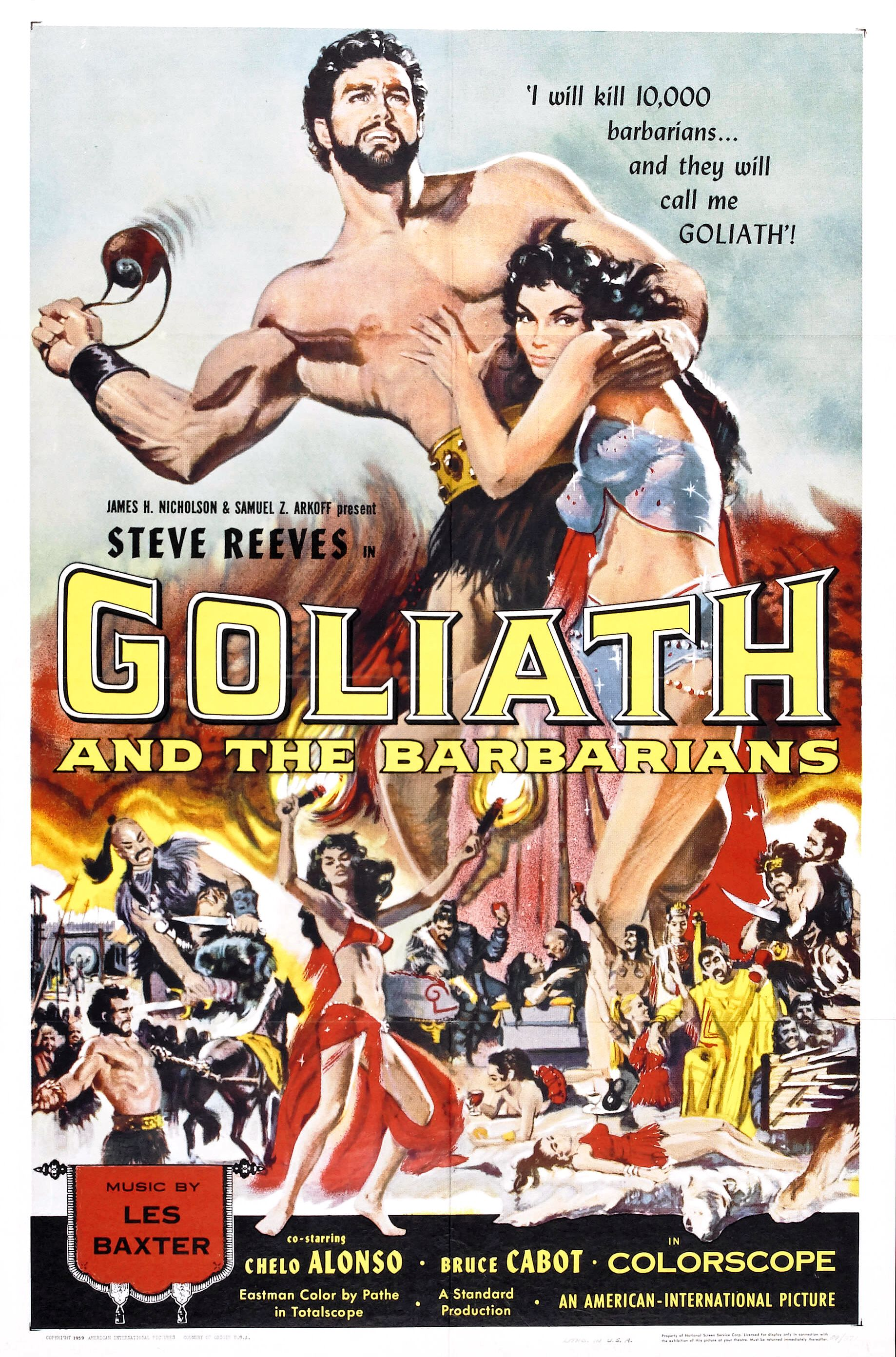
- Film poster by Reynold Brown
- Directed by: Carlo Campogalliani
- Written by: Emimmo Salvi; Gino Mangini; Nino Stresa; Giuseppe Taffarel
- Produced by: Emimmo Salvi
- Starring: Steve Reeves; Chelo Alonso; Bruce Cabot
- Cinematography: Bitto Albertini
- Edited by: Franco Fraticelli
- Music by: Carlo Innocenzi
- Production company: Standard S.r.l
- Distributed by: Centre Films
- Release date: 30 June 1959 (Italy)
- Running time: 100 minutes
- Country: Italy
- Languages: Italian; English
- Box office: $1.6 million (North America)

Goliath and the Barbarians (Italian: Il terrore dei barbari, lit. 'Terror of the Barbarians') is a 1959 Italian peplum film loosely based on events of the Lombard invasion of Italy in AD 568. As with many Italian peplums of the time, the English dubbed version renamed some of the characters (for example, "Emiliano" became "Goliath").

== Plot ==
Set in the 6th century, it follows the start of barbarian invasions and deals with one group that attacks a village and destroys anyone and anything that is there. One man, Emiliano, son of the village leader, is away at the time of attack. He swears revenge and wages a one-man war against the evil tribes. He also is helped by the survivors and his sister Lynda. He wears a lion head mask to instill fear into the hearts of the barbarians.

== Cast ==
- Steve Reeves as Emiliano
- Chelo Alonso as Landa
- Bruce Cabot as Alboin
- Giulia Rubini as Lidia
- Arturo Dominici as Svevo
- Livio Lorenzon as Igor
- Andrea Checchi as Delfo
- Carla Calò as Bruno's Mother
- Fabrizio Capucci as Bruno

== US Release ==
American International Pictures released the film in the US with a new score by Les Baxter. The film had originally been a Hercules movie but AIP decided rename it a Goliath film to avoid confusion with Hercules (1959). AIP invested $20,000 in the movie to help the producers complete it and were rewarded when it became a big hit. The film earned $1.6 million in North America during its initial release where it was double billed with Sign of the Gladiator Arkoff later estimated the film earned a gross of $1.8 million.

AIP announced plans to make a follow-up called Goliath and the Dragon from a script by Lou Rusoff with Debra Paget but this fell through and they ended up buying another Italian film called The Revenge of Hercules and simply renaming it Goliath and the Dragon.

=== DVD Releases ===
This film was released on a limited edition DVD by Wild East Productions in 2007 as a double feature with Goliath and the Vampires.

== See also ==
- list of historical drama films
- Late Antiquity
