= Chelo Alonso =

Cuban actress (1933–2019)

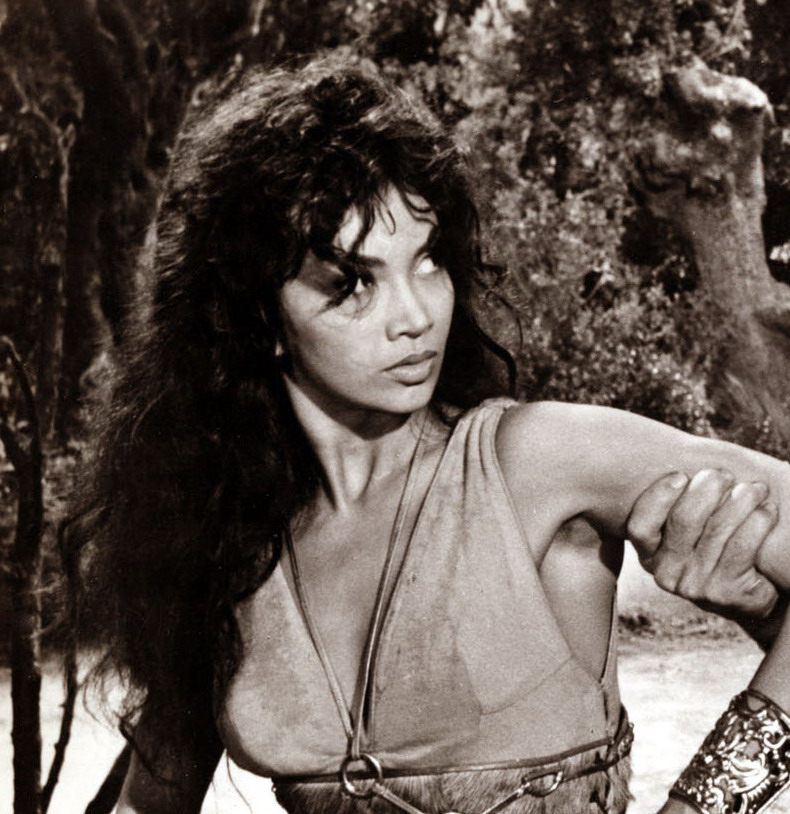
- Alonso in Morgan il pirata (1960)
- Born: Isabel Apolonia García Hernández; 10 April 1933; Camagüey, Cuba
- Died: 20 February 2019 (aged 85); Mentana, Italy
- Occupation: Actress
- Years active: 1959–1969

Chelo Alonso (born Isabel Apolonia García Hernández, 10 April 1933 – 20 February 2019) was a Cuban actress who became a star in Italian cinema, and ultimately a 1960s cult film heroine and sex symbol in the U.S. She was well known for playing femmes fatales with fiery tempers and sensual dance scenes.

== Biography ==
Alonso was born Isabel Apolonia García Hernández in Central Lugareño, Camagüey, Cuba, to a Cuban father and Mexican mother. She initially achieved recognition in Cuba for her dancing ability, becoming a sensation at Cuba's National Theatre in Havana.

Soon after, she emerged as a new exotic dancing talent at the Folies Bergère in Paris. She was billed as the "new Josephine Baker", who had also performed and become famous at the Folies. Alonso was billed as the "Cuban H-Bomb", and mixed Afro-Cuban rhythms from her homeland with "bump and grind".

Alonso was first noticed internationally in the 1959 film, Nel segno di Roma (Sheba and the Gladiator), which starred Anita Ekberg and Georges Marchal. Owing to a particularly erotic dance number, her picture and name became more prominent on the movie's publicity posters than either of the two leads, much to Ekberg's dismay.

Most of Alonso's films were adventure movies in the style of Le fatiche di Ercole (Hercules). Hercules starred Steve Reeves and was a wildly popular new genre in film. It paved the way for movies attempting to emulate it. These films required exotic talent, and Alonso's dark beauty fit the bill; she even starred with Steve Reeves himself in Goliath and the Barbarians (1959) and Morgan il pirata (1960). Goliath and the Barbarians earned Alonso the award of "Italian Cinema's Female Discovery".

In 1960, while making Morgan il pirata, Alonso met and married Aldo Pomilia, a production manager and producer. After making together Quattro notti con Alba (Desert War) in 1962, they had one son, Aldino Pomilia, and she retired for a while.

During a visit to Aldo in Spain, where he was the production supervisor of The Good, the Bad, and the Ugly (1966), she made a brief uncredited mute cameo. Pomilia then executive-produced her an auspicious comeback, playing opposite her countryman, Havana-born Tomas Milian in the cult western Corri uomo corri as Dolores, which is arguably the best film role of her career. Chelo then made a brief appearance in a variation of that previous role, also called Dolores, in another cult western, the bizarre Night of the Serpent (a.k.a. Nest of Vipers) after which she abandoned the film scene and focused on Italian TV.

After the death of her husband in 1986, Alonso moved to the city of Siena in Tuscany, Italy. She retired from film and started a cat-breeding business, as well as a four-star hotel.

Chelo Alonso died on 20 February 2019, at the age of 85.

== Filmography ==
| Year | Title | Role | Notes |
|---|---|---|---|
| 1959 | Guardatele ma non toccatele | Pepita Garcia | |
| 1959 | Nel Segno di Roma (Sheba and the Gladiator) | Erica | |
| 1959 | Tunis Top Secret | Sherazad / Soraya | |
| 1959 | Il terrore dei barbari (Goliath and the Barbarians) | Landa | |
| 1959 | La scimitarra del Saraceno (The Pirate and the Slave Girl) | Princess Miriam | |
| 1959 | I Reali di Francia (Attack of the Moors) | Suleima | |
| 1960 | Il terrore della maschera rossa (Terror of the Red Mask) | Karima | |
| 1960 | La strada dei giganti (Road of the Giants) | Stella Von Kruger | |
| 1960 | Le signore | Rosaria | |
| 1960 | La regina dei tartari (The Huns) | Tanya, Queen of the Tartars | |
| 1960 | Morgan il pirata (Morgan, the Pirate) | Concepcion | |
| 1960 | Maciste nella Valle dei Re (Son of Samson) | Queen Smedes | |
| 1960 | Gastone | Carmencita | |
| 1961 | Maciste nella terra dei ciclopi (Atlas Against the Cyclops) | Capys | |
| 1961 | La ragazza sotto il lenzuolo (Girl Under the Sheet) | Maria Celeste Cortez d'Aragona | |
| 1962 | Quattro notti con Alba (Desert War) | Alba Petti | |
| 1966 | Il buono, il brutto, il cattivo (The Good, the Bad and the Ugly) | Stevens' Wife | Uncredited |
| 1968 | Corri uomo corri (Run, Man, Run) | Dolores | |
| 1969 | Night of the Serpent | Dolores | (final film role) |
