= Franco Fantasia =

Italian actor

- Fantasia as Athena, disguised as Mentes in 1968's Odissea: dal Poema di Omero
- Born: 5 March 1924; Rhodes, Kingdom of Italy (now Greece)
- Died: 10 November 2002 (aged 78); Rome, Italy
- Occupation: Actor
- Years active: 1951–2002

Franco Fantasia (5 March 1924 – 10 November 2002) was an Italian film actor, stuntman and fencing master. He appeared in more than one hundred films from 1951 to 2002. He was the brother of actor Andrea Fantasia.

== Illness and death ==
September 29, 2002, Fantasia announced he had been diagnosed with lung cancer. Fantasia died of a heart attack on November 10, 2002, at Rome, Italy at the age of 78.

== Filmography ==
Film
Year	Title	Role	Notes
1951	The Black Captain		
1951	Quo Vadis	Minor Role	Uncredited
1951	Tizio, Caio, Sempronio		
1954	The Egyptian	Hittite Officer	Uncredited
1954	The Two Orphans	Roger de Vaudrey's Friend	
1954	Too Bad She's Bad	Un uomo	Uncredited
1955	The Sign of Venus	Dottore	
1955	The Red Cloak		
1955	Motivo in maschera		
1956	The Railroad Man	L'autista	Uncredited
1958	Il cocco di mamma	The Man seen with a Telescope	
1958	The Sword and the Cross	Ezra	
1959	Knight Without a Country		
1959	Cavalier in Devil's Castle		
1959	The Son of the Red Corsair	Dorado	
1959	Devil's Cavaliers	Duneil the Swordsman	
1959	L'arciere nero	Raniero	
1959	Due selvaggi a corte		
1959	The Pirate and the Slave Girl	Captain Volan	
1959	Ben-Hur	Roman Soldier Who Brings Crown to Gratus	Uncredited
1959	The Giant of Marathon	Senator	
1959	Attack of the Moors	Miguel	
1960	Terror of the Red Mask	Egidio	
1960	The Cossacks	Military Strategy Officer	
1960	The Angel Wore Red	Cabaret Customer	Uncredited
1960	Le signore		
1960	Knight of 100 Faces	Capitano d'Argentero / Silver Knight	
1960	Space Men	Sullivan	
1960	Queen of the Pirates	Pirate Who Likes Sandra	
1961	Constantine and the Cross	Roman Soldier	
1961	Revolt of the Mercenaries	Ilario	
1961	Drakut il vendicatore		
1961	The Centurion	Corinthian Aristocrat	
1961	El Cid	Soldier	
1961	The Vengeance of Ursus	Captain of the Guard	
1961	Rage of the Buccaneers	Officer on the slave ship	
1962	Zorro alla corte di Spagna	Manuel Garcia	
1962	Damon and Pythias	Rumius	
1962	The Secret Mark of D'Artagnan	Savignac	
1963	The Black Duke	Veniero	
1963	Zorro and the Three Musketeers	Count of Sevilla	
1963	The Executioner of Venice	Pietro	
1963	Le tre spade di Zorro	Coronel Martinez	
1963	The Lion of St. Mark	Vipera	
1963	Hercules, Samson and Ulysses		Uncredited
1963	Revenge of the Musketeers	Athos	
1964	Hero of Rome	Claudius	
1964	Hercules Against the Sons of the Sun	King Ata Hualpa	
1964	Sandokan Against the Leopard of Sarawak	Kuron	
1964	Il figlio di Cleopatra	Vetero	
1965	Buffalo Bill, Hero of the Far West	George	
1965	Fire Over Rome	Clodius	
1965	Red Dragon	Robert Grant	
1965	Blood for a Silver Dollar	Sheriff Anderson	
1965	The Falcon of the Desert	Atatur	
1965	Ich kauf' mir lieber einen Tirolerhut	Journalist	Uncredited
1965	Canadian Wilderness	Leo Limoux	
1965	Una ráfaga de plomo		
1966	Seven Dollars on the Red	Sheriff of Wishville	
1966	Man on the Spying Trapeze	Boris	
1966	El Greco	Fencing Master	
1966	The Drums of Tabu	Padre Lorenzo	
1966	One Thousand Dollars on the Black	Sheriff	
1966	Kriminal	Commissario Murad	
1967	Avenger X	Inspector Roux	
1967	Desert Commandos	Major Dalio	
1967	The Rover	French Admiral	
1967	On My Way to the Crusades, I Met a Girl Who...	Warrior	Uncredited
1967	A Handful of Heroes	Steffen	
1968	Kommissar X - Drei blaue Panther	Robert Hillary / Arthur Hillary	
1968	A Long Ride from Hell	Castleman	
1968	Odissea: dal Poema di Omero (The Odyssey)	Atena (Athena)/Mentès (Mentes)	
1968	Sangue chiama sangue	Capitano Roy	
1968	Il marchio di Kriminal		Uncredited
1968	Hate Thy Neighbor	Sheriff	
1968	Persecución hasta Valencia		
1968	Wrath of God	Mark	
1968	Il lungo giorno del massacro	Clay	
1968	Don Chisciotte and Sancio Panza	Fencing master	
1968	The Nephews of Zorro	Don Diego de La Vega	
1969	Zorro in the Court of England	Captain Wells	
1969	Battle of the Commandos	Schiwers	
1970	Sartana's Here… Trade Your Pistol for a Coffin		Uncredited
1970	Angeli senza paradiso	Bauer	
1970	Adiós, Sabata	Señor Ocaño	
1970	Waterloo	Delessart	Uncredited
1971	Nights and Loves of Don Juan	Mahid	
1971	Cross Current	Professor Mauri	
1971	Return of Sabata	Circus owner	
1971	Kill! Kill! Kill! Kill!	Camel Driver	
1972	I leoni di Pietroburgo		
1972	The Sicilian Checkmate		
1972	Ben and Charlie	Sheriff Robbins	Uncredited
1972	Seven Blood-Stained Orchids	Lieutenant Renzi	
1972	Justine de Sade	Saint-Florent	
1972	La mansión de la niebla	Mr. Porter	
1972	Knife of Ice	Inspector Duran	
1972	La grande avventura di Scaramouche	D'Arcy	
1972	La calandria	Il Bargello	
1972	The Grand Duel	Bounty Killer	Uncredited
1973	Gang War in Milan	Chief Inspector Contalvi	
1973	The Big Family	Chief of Police	
1973	Sinbad and the Caliph of Baghdad		
1973	Women in Cell Block 7	Chief Inspector	
1973	Man with the Golden Winchester	Captain François Bardeau	
1973	Long Lasting Days	Manolo	
1974	Carambola!	Professor	
1976	Street People	Priest	
1976	The Black Corsair	Van Stiller	
1976	Fear in the City	Rinaldi	
1977	The Heroin Busters	Jewelry Store Manager	Uncredited
1977	California	Man offering work	
1977	I Am the Law	Colonel	
1977	La tigre è ancora viva: Sandokan alla riscossa!	English Colonel	TV movie
1978	Slave of the Cannibal God	Father Moses	
1978	L'inquilina del piano di sopra	Maître d'	
1979	From Hell to Victory	Captain Vanderkreut	
1979	Zombi 2	Matthias	Uncredited
1980	Eaten Alive!	Reeves	
1980	Lion of the Desert	Graziani's Aide	
1980	Febbre a 40!		Uncredited
1984	Claretta		
1985	Liberté, Égalité, Choucroute		
1985	Wild Team	Guillermo Cordura	
1986	Vendetta dal futuro	Rev. Arthur Mosely	Uncredited
1987	The Inquiry		
1990	Cop Target	Garcia, assistant to the Chief of Police	Uncredited
1990	Killer Crocodile 2	Russel	Uncredited
1991	Caccia allo scorpione d'oro	Killer	
1991	Buck ai confini del cielo	André Savall	
1996	3	Marchese De Carolis	
1998	Something to Believe In	Professor Dervol	
1998	Incontri proibiti	Dott. Attilio Velardi	
1999	Li chiamarono... briganti!		
2000	L'ombra del gigante	Medico	
