= Mill of the Stone Women =

1960 film by Giorgio Ferroni

- Italian film poster
- Italian: Il mulino delle donne di pietra
- Directed by: Giorgio Ferroni
- Screenplay by: Remigio Del Grosso; Ugo Liberatore; Giorgio Stegani; Giorgio Ferroni
- Story by: Remigio Del Grosso
- Starring: Pierre Brice; Scilla Gabel; Dany Carrel
- Cinematography: Pier Ludovico Pavoni
- Edited by: Antonietta Zita
- Music by: Carlo Innocenzi
- Production companies: Vanguard Films; C.E.C. Comptoir D'Expansion Cinematographique
- Distributed by: C.D.C. (Italy)
- Release dates: 30 August 1960 (Italy); 5 September 1962 (France)
- Running time: 96 minutes (Note: Sources differ regarding the film's running time, though the original Italian version (as released in 2021 by Arrow Films) runs 96 minutes; other versions of the film released in different countries have shorter running times.)
- Countries: Italy; France
- Box office: ₤164 million

Mill of the Stone Women (Italian: Il mulino delle donne di pietra) is a 1960 Italian Gothic horror film directed by Giorgio Ferroni, starring Pierre Brice and Scilla Gabel. It follows a journalist writing a story on a sculptor in 19th-century Holland who falls in love with the artist's sequestered daughter; meanwhile, a series of missing person cases seem to encircle the windmill where the artist lives and works.

The film is notable as the first Italian horror film to be shot in color.

== Plot ==
Writer Hans van Arnhim travels to a remote island in Holland to research a story about the fabled Mill of the Stone Women, a carousel of female statues created by art professor and sculptor Gregorius Wahl. Gregorius allows Hans to stay in the mill's attic, where he stores some of his unused sculptures. Hans meets and quickly falls in love with Elfie, the professor's attractive but ailing daughter. When Hans' girlfriend, Liselotte, comes to visit him at the mill, she is highly disturbed by the carousel of sculptures and faints.

Later, Professor Wahl informs Hans that Elfie suffers from a mysterious illness, which took her mother's life as well, and that their live-in physician, Dr. Loren Bohlem, provides her with around-the-clock care should she need medical intervention. That night, when Hans attempts to break off his romance with Elfie, she becomes hysterical, threatening to go as far as killing him. In her rage, she collapses and emits blood from her mouth. Hans hurriedly carries Elfie to her bedroom, and notices strange lesions appear on her face before she suddenly dies.

That night, Hans is plagued by haunting visions of Elfie in the attic. He subsequently hears a piano playing downstairs, and confusedly believes it is Elfie, but the music ceases when he calls her name. Directed by what seems to be Gregorius' disembodied voice, he finds Elfie's lifeless body lying in a tomb at the nearby cemetery. Fleeing back to the mill, he awakens Gregorius, and begins questioning him about Elfie. Moments later, Elfie descends the staircase, alive and seemingly unscathed. Gregorius arranges to have Hans leave the mill, accusing him of being mentally unbalanced.

When Hans leaves, Gregorius and Dr. Bohlem reveal their plot: they deliberately drugged him to make him appear insane, thus giving a reason for him to be ejected from the mill and separated from the obsessive Elfie. That night, Dr. Bohlem and Gregorius bring Annelore, a local woman whom they have kidnapped, to a makeshift procedure room hidden in the mill. There they drain Annelore of her blood, killing her, and transfuse it to Elfie, reviving her. Gregorius then uses Annelore's corpse as one of his next art projects—his sculptures of women are, in fact, real victims encased in wax.

Meanwhile, Hans convalesces with Liselotte and her friend, Ralf. However, Hans is still troubled by his apparent hallucinations at the mill, and recalls seeing the missing Annelore tied to a chair in the basement. Hans and Ralf subsequently discover that Liselotte has gone missing, and rush towards the mill to locate her. There they find Annelore's corpse coated in wax, in preparation for her addition to Gregorius's display. Meanwhile, Gregorius and Bohlem prepare to use an antidote Bohlem has developed, which they intend to transfuse into Elfie using Liselotte's blood. However, when Bohlem professes his love for Elfie, Gregorius attacks him, eventually stabbing the doctor to death. Gregorius attempts to begin the transfusion himself, but finds that the bottle containing Bohlem's antidote shattered in his pocket when he collapsed. Hans and Ralf rescue Liselotte from the basement operating room. With his daughter dead, Gregorius sets fire to the mill. Hans, Ralf, and Liselotte manage to escape, as Gregorius is immolated along with his carousel of "sculptures".

== Cast ==
- Pierre Brice as Hans von Arnim
- Scilla Gabel as Elfie Wahl
- Wolfgang Preiss as Dr. Loren Bohlem
- Dany Carrel as Liselotte Kornheim
- Herbert A.E. Böhme as Professor Gregorius Wahl
- Liana Orfei as Annelore
- Marco Guglielmi as Ralf
- Olga Solbelli as Selma
- Alberto Archetti as Konrad

== Production ==
The opening credits of Mill of the Stone Women claim the film's plot is based on a short story by Pieter van Weigen in the book Flemish Tales. This is fiction by the film's publicity department, as there is no book by that title or Flemish author by that name.

Shot by director of photography Pier Ludovico Pavoni, it was the first Italian horror film in color, not counting the comedy Uncle Was a Vampire.

Location shooting was done in the Netherlands. The outside scenes in the countryside and the village of Veeze were shot in different villages in the province of Utrecht and in Koog aan de Zaan. Establishing shots of the city where Liselotte lives were made in Amsterdam.

== Release ==
Mill of the Stone Women was released in Italy on 30 August 1960, the third locally based horror film released in Italy in August of that year after Black Sunday and Atom Age Vampire. It grossed higher in Italy than either of the other films, with a total of 164 million Italian lira. Roberto Curti, author of Italian Gothic Horror films, 1957–1969, described its earnings as "disappointing" in its home country, but points out that it was more successful abroad, where it was distributed by Galatea.

=== Critical response ===
A contemporary review in La Stampa stated that Ferroni directed the film with skill and technique, but that it resorted to cliches of coffins, corpses and screams that make scary moments less frequent than expected. The reviewer of the Monthly Film Bulletin wrote that the "flat countryside of Holland, with its windmills, provides some unusual, if rather neglected settings for this macabre, Grand Guignol piece", but that "apart from [its] grandstand finish, which is unusually good within its melodramatic limits, the pace is dreadfully sluggish and monotonous."

In his book Italian Horror Film Directors, Louis Paul praised the film's visual appearance, which was inspired by Flemish and Dutch painters. While critiquing the film's rhythm, he noted its "memorable images".

=== Home media ===
Arrow Films released a two-disc limited edition Blu-ray on 14 December 2021, featuring four different versions of the film: the original 96-minute Italian and English-language versions; a 90-minute French-language version with exclusive footage; and a 95-minute English-language cut released in United States, featuring alternate dubbing and added visual effects.

== See also ==
- List of French films of 1960
- List of Italian films of 1960
- List of horror films of 1960
- Mystery of the Wax Museum

== Sources ==
- Curti, Roberto (2015). Italian Gothic Horror Films, 1957-1969. McFarland. ISBN 978-1-476-61989-7.
- Paul, Louis (2005). Italian Horror Film Directors. McFarland. ISBN 978-0-7864-8749-3.
- Hughes, Howard (2011). Cinema Italiano - The Complete Guide From Classics To Cult. London - New York: I.B.Tauris. ISBN 978-1-84885-608-0.
