= A Long Ride from Hell =

1968 film

- US film poster
- Directed by: Alex Burks
- Screenplay by: Roberto Natale; Steve Reeves
- Based on: Judas Gun by Gordon D. Shirreffs
- Produced by: Manolo Bolognini
- Starring: Steve Reeves; Wayde Preston; Dick Palmer; Silvana Venturelli; Lee Burton; Ted Carter; Rosalba Neri
- Cinematography: Enzo Barboni
- Edited by: Roberto Perpignani
- Music by: Carlo Savina
- Production company: B.R.C. Produzione Film
- Distributed by: Titanus
- Release date: 1968
- Running time: 95 minutes
- Country: Italy
- Language: Italian

A Long Ride from Hell (Italian: Vivo per la tua morte, lit. "I live for your death") is a 1968 Spaghetti Western film directed by Camillo Bazzoni. It is based on the novel Judas Gun by Gordon D. Shirreffs. The film was bodybuilder Steve Reeves' final film prior to his retirement. Reeves, who turned down the lead of A Fistful of Dollars financed and co-wrote the film himself upon seeing the successful box office returns of the Clint Eastwood spaghetti westerns at the time. The film did poorly and Reeves retired from filmmaking that year.

== Plot ==
Reeves portrays cowboy Mike Sturges, who, along with his younger brother, Roy, is sentenced to Yuma Territorial Prison on a trumped-up train robbery charge. Both endure cruel treatment before Mike escapes to exact revenge on their enemies.

== Cast ==
- Steve Reeves - Mike Sturges
- Wayde Preston - Marlin Mayner
- Guido Lollobrigida - Deputy Sheriff Harry
- Domenico Palmara - Sheriff Max Freeman
- Silvana Venturelli - Ruth Harper
- Giovanni Pazzafini - Bill Savage
- Sergio De Vecchi - Roy Sturges
- Rosalba Neri - Encarnacion
- Spartaco Conversi - Bobcat Bates
- Franco Balducci - Mason
- Bruno Corazzari - Shorty
- Franco Fantasia - Castleman
- Aldo Sambrell - Mexican bounty hunter
- Silvan Bacci - Felicias
- Mario Maranzana - Naco bartender
- Emma Baron Cerlesi - Mrs. Sturges
- Enzo Fiermonte

== Releases ==
Wild East originally released this in a limited edition R0 NTSC DVD in 2008. In 2011 Code Red, after settling a distribution rights dispute with Wild East, re-released the film with Wild East's special features, an interview with Mimmo Palmara and a feature with Steve Reeves. Both are out-of-print.
