= Le signore =

1960 film by Turi Vasile

- Directed by: Turi Vasile
- Written by: Ugo Guerra; Luciano Martino; Turi Vasile
- Story by: Sergio Corbucci; Luciano Martino
- Produced by: Fortunato Misiano
- Starring: Chelo Alonso; Nadia Gray
- Cinematography: Carlo Bellero
- Music by: Michele Cozzoli
- Distributed by: Titanus
- Release date: 1960
- Language: Italian

Le signore (i.e. "The ladies") is a 1960 Italian comedy film directed by Turi Vasile and starring Chelo Alonso and Nadia Gray.

== Cast ==
- Chelo Alonso as Rosario
- Nadia Gray as Tatjana Baker
- Liana Orfei as Patrizia Viotti
- Irène Tunc as Eva
- Bice Valori as Nora
- Enrico Maria Salerno as Renato, aka René
- Paolo Ferrari as Giorgio
- Livio Lorenzon as Mario
- Francesco Mulé as Ercole
- Paolo Panelli as Attilio Brando
- Antonella Steni as Ninetta, Renato's wife
- Giampiero Littera as Maurotto
- Eleonora Morana as Irene
- Mario Carotenuto as Serafino
- Fernanda Pasqui as Giulietta, Attilio's wife
- Miranda Campa as The True Eva
- Daniele Vargas as Andrea
- Gianni Bonagura
- Alberto Bonucci
- Franco Fantasia
- Giovanna Galletti
- Ciccio Barbi

== See also ==
List of Italian films of 1960
