= Rage of the Buccaneers =

- Directed by: Mario Costa
- Written by: John Byrne; Ottavio Poggi
- Produced by: Ottavio Poggi
- Starring: Ricardo Montalbán; Vincent Price
- Cinematography: Carlo Bellero
- Edited by: Renato Cinquini
- Music by: Carlo Rustichelli
- Release date: 1961
- Country: Italy
- Languages: Italian; English

Rage of the Buccaneers (Italian: Gordon, il pirata nero), also known as Pirate Warrior, is a 1961 Italian epic adventure film directed by Mario Costa and starring Ricardo Montalbán and Vincent Price.

== Plot ==
In the 1961 Italian epic adventure film Rage of the Buccaneers, Ricardo Montalbán stars as Captain Gordon, the famous “Black Pirate,” a sworn enemy of slavery and in particular of slave traders. It is eventually revealed that he was once a slave himself. No date is given, but the fashions appear to be 17th Century.

It opens with Captain Gordon in a fierce sword battle with Captain Tortuga, played by José Jaspe, a notorious slave trader with an eye patch. Gordon threatens to deprive Tortuga of his other eye if he ever trades slaves again but lets him escape with his life. Gordon enlists a number of Tortuga’s former pirates and they encounter a slave ship whose crew throw some of the slaves overboard so as not to be caught with them. Gordon and company battle the slavers and rescue some of the slaves.

Gordon then sails to San Salvador, where he serves as a sort of mediator of disputes. Beautiful Luanal, played by Liana Orfei, who has stowed away on Gordon’s ship, loves him, but he has eyes only for Manuela, the governor’s daughter, played by Giulia Rubini, who he rescues from ruffians at a festival her father has forbidden her to attend.

Vincent Price is at his sinister best as Romero, who schemes to get rid of the Governor, played by Mario Feliciani, marry the governor’s daughter, and become governor himself. Romero has Gordon imprisoned but Manuela helps him escape, and they must work to rescue the Governor and defeat Romero and the treacherous Tortuga before it is too late.

As might well be expected in a film titled Rage of the Buccaneers, there is a lot of sword fighting and other combat. The most disturbing scene is probably when a number of slaves are thrown overboard with their chains still attached. There is also a scene in which slave traders seize a number of citizens off the street. None of the sword fights qualify for greatest in screen history, but Montalbán acquits himself well. The action moves along briskly and the plot is easy to follow.

== Cast ==
- Ricardo Montalbán as Captain Gordon
- Vincent Price as Romero
- Giulia Rubini as Manuela
- Liana Orfei as Luanal
- Mario Feliciani as Governor
- Giustino Durano as Juan
- Gisella Sofio as Rosita
- José Jaspe as Captain Tortuga
- Edoardo Toniolo as Felipe Cortez
- Gino Marturano as Tarto
- Andrea Fantasia as Bonifacio
- Franco Fantasia as Official
