= The Vengeance of Ursus =

- Directed by: Luigi Capuano
- Screenplay by: Marcello Ciorciolini; Luigi Capuano; Roberto Gianviti; Nino Scolaro
- Story by: Marcello Ciorciolini
- Produced by: Ferdinand Felicioni
- Starring: Samson Burke; Wandisa Guida; Livio Lorenzon; Nadia Sanders
- Cinematography: Oberdan Troiani
- Edited by: Antonietta Zita
- Music by: Carlo Innocenzi
- Production company: Splendor Film
- Release date: 7 December 1961 (Italy)
- Running time: 88 minutes
- Country: Italy

The Vengeance of Ursus (Italian: La vendetta di Ursus) is a 1961 Italian peplum film directed by Luigi Capuano.

== Plot ==
The evil King Zagro (Livio Lorenzon) asks the king of a neighboring country (King Alteo) for permission to wed his daughter, the beautiful Princess Sira (Wandisa Guida), a political union that will join their two countries together. The mighty warrior Ursus, who fought for years in the army of King Alteo, has retired from the military to run a farm in the countryside with his little brother Dario. Ursus had once asked Alteo for the hand of the princess himself, but the king turned him down because Ursus was not of noble birth.

After Princess Sira travels to Zagro's kingdom to be wed, she learns that Zagro plans to assassinate her father after the wedding and then dispose of her at a later time, leaving Zagro in complete control of both countries. Zagro has a spy in Alteo's kingdom, the king's foppish advisor Licurgo, whom he uses to influence Alteo's decisions.

Ursus learns of the plot and wants to warn Alteo of the danger he is in, but Zagro captures Ursus' brother and threatens to kill the boy if Ursus does not surrender. Ursus turns himself in, and is forced to become a slave in Zagro's prison camp. When some rebels in Zagro's court free the boy from his captivity, Ursus is able to escape from the slave camp without fear of endangering his brother's life, and the two head back to King Alteo's kingdom, to warn him that he is about to be assassinated.

Licurgo uses his influence to make Alteo doubt Ursus' warning however, telling him that Ursus is lying about Zagro because he wants to marry the princess himself. Soon after, Licurgo arranges for an assassin to murder the king, and is able to frame Ursus for the assassination.

To prove his innocence, Ursus undergoes several tests of strength in an arena, the greatest of which involves being tied to an elephant which then drags Ursus closer and closer to a wooden wall bristling with razor-sharp knives. Ursus uses his great strength to resist the mammoth creature, and succeeds in convincing the people that Zagro was behind the assassination of their king. Enraged, Zagro stabs his confederate Licurgo to death.

In desperation, Zagro orders his armies to attack, and a tremendous battle ensues. During the chaos, Ursus stabs Zagro to death with his own sword, and liberates the people, as well as Princess Sira. Sira takes over the throne, and asks Ursus to rule at her side, and the populace celebrates their newfound freedom.

== Cast ==
- Samson Burke as Ursus
- Wandisa Guida as Sira
- Livio Lorenzon as King Zagro
- Nadine Sanders as Sabra
- Gianni Rizzo as Licurgo
- Nerio Bernardi as King Alteo
- Gina Rovere as Lidia
- Attilio Dottesio as Afro, Zagro's Servant
- Franco Fantasia as Captain of the guard
- Roberto Chevalier as Dario
- Ugo Sasso as Anio the bartender
- Ignazio Balsamo as Andros

== Release ==
The Vengeance of Ursus was released in Italy on December 7, 1961.

== See also ==
- List of Italian films of 1961

== Biography ==
- Hughes, Howard (2011). Cinema Italiano - The Complete Guide From Classics To Cult. London - New York: I.B.Tauris. ISBN 978-1-84885-608-0.
- Kinnard, Roy; Crnkovich, Tony (2017). Italian Sword and Sandal Films, 1908–1990. McFarland. ISBN 9781476662916.
- Roberto Poppi, Mario Pecorari (2007). Dizionario del cinema italiano. I film. Rome: Gremese Editore. ISBN 978-8884405036.
