= Liana Orfei =

Italian actress (born 1937)

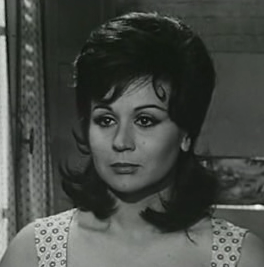
- Orfei in the movie Our Husbands (1966)
- Born: 6 January 1937 (age 89); San Giovanni in Persiceto, Bologna, Kingdom of Italy
- Occupation: Actress
- Years active: 1959–1971
- Spouse(s): Angelo Piccinelli (1954–?) (divorced); Paolo Pristipino (1975–present)

Liana Orfei (born 6 January 1937) is an Italian actress and circus artist. She appeared in more than 30 films between 1959 and 1971.

== Life and career ==
Born in San Giovanni in Persiceto, the daughter and niece of famous circus artists, since her childhood Orfei started her engagement in activities typical of the sector such as being a clown, a horsewoman and even a tamer of wild beasts. Her film career began in the late 1950s, when she played some secondary roles in several films of adventure and peplum genre and in some comedies. In a short time she landed more significant productions and roles, working with directors such as Ettore Scola, Mario Monicelli, Antonio Pietrangeli, Dino Risi. She retired from acting after playing a role inspired on herself in Federico Fellini's I clowns (1970). She was also active on stage and in television.

She is the cousin of the actress Moira Orfei.

== Selected filmography ==
- Tipi da spiaggia (1959)
- Attack of the Moors (1959)
- Guardatele ma non toccatele (1959)
- Knight of 100 Faces (1960)
- Terror of the Red Mask (1960)
- Le signore (1960)
- La Dolce Vita (1960)
- Mill of the Stone Women (1960)
- Gentlemen Are Born (1960)
- Pirates of the Coast (1960)
- Rage of the Buccaneers (1961)
- Queen of the Nile (1961)
- Hercules in the Valley of Woe (1961)
- The Tartars (1961)
- Damon and Pythias (1962)
- The Avenger (1962)
- Duel of Fire (1962)
- Hercules, Samson and Ulysses (1964)
- Casanova 70 (1965)
- Our Husbands (1966)
- Diamonds Are a Man's Best Friend (1966)
- Mr. Kinky (1968)
