= Attack of the Moors =

1959 film

- Directed by: Mario Costa
- Written by: Vittorio Calvino; Nino Stresa
- Produced by: Alberto Manca
- Starring: Chelo Alonso; Rik Battaglia; Gérard Landry
- Cinematography: Augusto Tiezzi
- Edited by: Otello Colangeli
- Music by: Carlo Innocenzi
- Release date: 1959
- Language: Italian

Attack of the Moors (Italian: I Reali di Francia), also known as The Kings of France, is a 1959 Italian adventure film directed by Mario Costa and starring Chelo Alonso, Rik Battaglia and Gérard Landry.

== Cast ==
- Chelo Alonso as Suleima
- Rik Battaglia as Roland
- Gérard Landry as Gontrano
- Liana Orfei as Jitana
- Livio Lorenzon as Basirocco
- Andrea Scotti as Lanciotto
- Franco Fantasia as Miguel
- Luisella Boni as Annette
- Olga Solbelli as Fazia
- Gino Marturano as Juanito
- Paola Quattrini as Princess Maria
- Carlo Tamberlani as Duke of Chateau Roux
- Cesare Fantoni as Achirro
- Nerio Bernardi as King of France
