= Assignment: Outer Space =

1960 Italian film by Antonio Margheriti

- Italian Theatrical release poster
- Directed by: Antonio Margheriti
- Screenplay by: Antonio Margheriti; Ennio De Concini
- Starring: Rik Van Nutter; Gabriella Farinon; David Montresor; Archie Savage; Alain Dijon
- Cinematography: Marcello Masciocchi
- Music by: Lelio Luttazzi
- Production companies: Titanus; Ultra Film
- Distributed by: Titanus
- Release date: August 1960 (Italy)
- Running time: 79 minutes
- Country: Italy

Assignment: Outer Space (known as Space-Men in Italy) is a 1960 Italian science fiction film directed by Antonio Margheriti. The film stars Rik Van Nutter and co-stars Gabriella Farinon, David Montresor, Archie Savage, and Alain Dijon. The film was released in Italy in August 1960.

Space-Men's storyline recounts a mission in the 22nd century aboard an orbiting space station. The mission involves a risky effort by its crew to redirect a malfunctioning spaceship that threatens to destroy the Earth.

== Plot ==
In 2116, Interplanetary Chronicle of New York reporter Ray Peterson launches aboard the spaceship Bravo Zulu 88, joining the crew of an orbiting space station. Peterson is assigned to write a story about the "infra-radiation flux in Galaxy M12", but soon tension develops between Peterson and the station commander. He believes the reporter is in the way, calling him a "leech", but he has orders not to interfere with Peterson. A complication arises when Lucy, the station botanist and navigator, becomes attracted to both the commander and Peterson.

When the errant Spaceship Alpha Two enters the inner solar system, its photon generators radiate enough heat to destroy the Earth. In efforts to intercept Alpha Two, crew members Sullivan and space station pilot Al sacrifice themselves in separate but futile attempts to destroy the dangerous spaceship with missiles.

With both crew members now dying from their attempts, Peterson uses Space Taxi B91 to get aboard the errant spaceship. His goal: to disarm Alpha Two's photon generators. Once inside, he is directed to disable the spaceship's computers and shut down all power sources. He soon finds himself trapped inside when the power loss also disables the emergency hatch. (Note: The film describes automatic functions on the spaceships being controlled by an "electric brain" or "electronic brain", using both terms interchangeably.)

Despite orders from the high command not to intervene, the commander and his assistant disobey and attempt to intercept the out-of-control Alpha Two and rescue Peterson. They are finally able to reach the reporter as he is collapsing and bring him back safely. With Alpha Two now safely redirected away from the Earth, Peterson wins Lucy's affection and the commander's respect for his heroic actions.

== Cast ==
- Rik Van Nutter as Ray Peterson (IZ41)
- Gabriella Farinon as Lucy (Y13) (credited as Gaby Farinon in Assignment: Outer Space)
- David Montresor as George the Commander
- Archie Savage as Al (X15)
- Alain Dijon as Archie (Y16)
- Franco Fantasia as Sullivan
- Joe Pollini as King 116
- David Maran as Davis
- José Néstor as Venus Commander
- Anita Todesco as Venus Control
- Aldo Pini as Jacson

== Production ==
Antonio Margheriti had read science fiction comic books since a young age, and when offered the chance to direct a science fiction film, he immediately seized the opportunity. Space-Men was Margheriti's first full directorial effort. He went on to direct 55 films.

Assignment: Outer Space's script was written by Margheriti and Ennio De Concini. The film was shot at the same time director Mario Bava was filming Black Sunday on a sound stage next door. Margheriti also took over the studio with the miniatures work featured in the film's outer space segments.

== Release ==
Assignment: Outer Space was distributed by Titanus and opened in Rome in August 1960. The film was re-titled Assignment: Outer Space for its release in the United States on December 13, 1961. During its theatrical run in the US, it was double billed with either The Phantom Planet or Journey to the Seventh Planet.

== Reception ==
In Phil Hardy's book Science Fiction: Complete Film Source Book (1984), Assignment: Outer Space was described as "... not one of Margheriti's best, the narrative line is unclear and jerky" while also noting that "its visual splendors are ample compensation".

== See also ==
- List of films in the public domain in the United States
- List of science fiction films of the 1960s
- List of Italian films of 1960
