= Damon and Pythias (1962 film) =

- Directed by: Curtis Bernhardt
- Written by: Samuel Marx (story); Samuel Marx (screenplay); Franco Riganti (screenplay); Paola Ojetti/Franco Riganti (dialogue: Italian version); Bridget Boland (dialogue: English version)
- Produced by: Sam Jaffe (associate producer); Samuel Marx (associate producer)
- Cinematography: Aldo Tonti
- Edited by: Niccolò Lazzari
- Music by: Angelo Francesco Lavagnino
- Distributed by: Metro-Goldwyn-Mayer
- Release date: 1962
- Running time: 101 minutes (Italy); 99 minutes (U.S.)
- Countries: Italy; United States
- Language: English

Il tiranno di Siracusa (English Release Title: Damon and Pythias) is a 1962 Italian/American film directed by Curtis Bernhardt. The film is based on the Greek legend of Damon and Pythias, and set during the reign of Dionysius I of Syracuse (432–367 BC).

== Plot summary ==
In Ancient Greece, Protheus, the leader of the Pythagorian society in Athens, dies. Fellow Pythagorian Pythias is ordered to go to Syracuse and convince the philosopher Arcanos to return with him and take Protheus' place. Arcanos, however, has fled into hiding because of the tyrannical king Dionysius the Elder, and his captain of the guard Cariso. These two ruthlessly hunt down and destroy anyone involved in this "dangerous" philosophy, as the Pythagorians call all men brothers/equal and embrace pacifism over war and conquest.

Fearing that his pregnant wife Nerissa will be too upset if he tells her himself, Pythias leaves his brother-in-law Demetrius to tell her of his dangerous mission. Nerissa interprets this as Pythias loving his philosophy more than her, and falls severely ill. Meanwhile, Pythias arrives in Syracuse, and meets streetwise local con man and bandit Damon. Damon initially tries to rob Pythias, until the pair are chased by Cariso and his guards. Pythias offers Damon a great amount of silver if he can help him find Arcanos, and Damon agrees to hide Pythias in his lair. Initially, Damon mocks Pythias for his beliefs, his pacifism, and his attempts to befriend everyone. However, Damon still organizes his fellow bandits and street people to help him find Arcanos for the money. Cariso then offers Damon much gold, and a prize stallion, if Damon will betray Pythias and help HIM find and kill Arcanos. Damon agrees; Pythias is furious when he finds out Damon double-crossed him, but still refuses, even when he has Damon helpless, to harm or kill him.

Damon, realizing he lost what could have been his first true friend, follows Pythias, makes amends, and tries to help him and Arcanos escape. Arcanos and Damon succeed; however, Pythias crashes his chariot, and is arrested by Cariso. Demetrius arrives in Syracuse and informs Damon that Nerissa is expected to die before the baby is born. Damon goes to King Dionysisus and offers himself as a substitute prisoner; the king initially refuses, until he realizes he can use this situation to discredit the Pythagorians. He offers Pythias three choices: be executed as planned, leave and allow Damon to die in his place, or leave but return at the end of two months to die in Damon's place. Pythias and Damon accept the third option, and Pythias returns home. The whole of Syracuse learns of the wager, and Dionysius believes that Pythias will not return and therefore will prove his own philosophy ineffective. However, to be safe, he orders Cariso to kill Pythias if he somehow does try to return.

Pythias returns to Nerissa, who regains her will to live and gives birth to a healthy baby boy, whom they name Damon. Pythias then breaks the news to her and returns to Syracuse. Cariso and his men do everything they can to find and stop him, but Damon's gang decides to aid and shelter him. Pythias is forced to fight Cariso himself, but Damon's gang and several other street people step in to help, killing the captain. Damon is led to the square and Dionysius mocks his loyalty, but Damon openly accuses him of hindering Pythias. Pythias then arrives to take Damon's place before the archers. Dionysius accuses him of killing Cariso, in an effort to discredit his pacifism, but Damon's gang takes all the blame. The tyrant then orders Pythias' execution, but by now the people have seen the power of loyal friendship. Dionysius' own son leads the people in begging the king to let both prisoners live; Dionysius, after hesitating, graciously admits defeat and pardons them, as the crowd celebrates.

== Cast ==
- Guy Williams as Damon
- Don Burnett as Pythias
- Ilaria Occhini as Nerissa
- Liana Orfei as Adriana
- Marina Berti as Mereka, Damon's sister
- Arnoldo Foà as Dionysius the Tyrant
- Carlo Giustini as Cariso
- Aldo Silvani as Patriarch
- Andrea Bosic as Arcanos
- Franco Fantasia as Rumius the Fencing Master
- Lawrence Montaigne as Flute Player
- Enrico Glori as Nikos
- Gianni Bonagura as Philemon
- Carolyn De Fonseca as Chloe
- Carlo Rizzo as Libia

== Production ==
Jaffe and Marx wanted the leads played by John Gavin and James Garner.

== Reception ==
The film made a profit of $6,000.

== Release ==
The international distribution was taken over by MGM.

== Biography ==
- Hughes, Howard (2011). Cinema Italiano - The Complete Guide From Classics To Cult. London - New York: I.B.Tauris. ISBN 978-1-84885-608-0.
