= Marco Guglielmi =

Italian actor

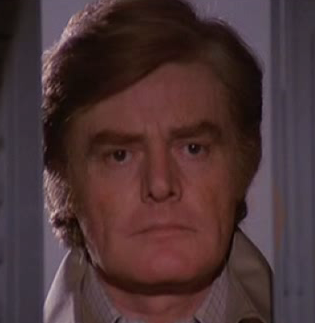
- Guglielmi in La minorenne (1974)
- Born: 6 October 1926; Sanremo
- Died: 25 December 2005 (aged 79); Rome
- Years active: 1952-1992

Marco Guglielmi (6 October 1926 – 28 December 2005) was an Italian actor, screenwriter and author.

== Life and career ==
Born Augusto Guglielmi in Sanremo, he graduated from ragioneria, then he enrolled at the university in the faculty of economics and business, though without finishing his studies. Guglielmi later attended the Centro Sperimentale di Cinematografia in Rome, graduating in 1953, despite having participated in 1951–52 in a few films in minor roles. He then started a busy acting career on stage, television and cinema, even if often cast in supporting and character roles.

Guglielmi also worked in fotoromanzi for the magazine Sogno. He was also active as screenwriter and novelist; his novel, "Er più de Roma", co-written by Lucio Mandarà, was adapted into the film Il principe fusto, directed by Maurizio Arena and released in 1960.

== Selected filmography ==
- They Were Three Hundred (1952) - L'alfiere
- Nessuno ha tradito (1952)
- Er fattaccio (1952) - Tarmato
- Attila (1954) - Kadis
- The Art of Getting Along (1955) - L'avvocato Giardini
- The Abandoned (1955) - Scattered soldiers' officer
- Folgore Division (1955) - 1st Lieutenant Corsini
- Destinazione Piovarolo (1955)
- Andrea Chenier (1955)
- Una voce, una chitarra, un po' di luna (1956) - Don Pietro
- Dimentica il mio passato (1957)
- Engaged to Death (1957)
- El Alamein (1957) - Tenente Santi
- La canzone del destino (1957) - Cesare Marini
- La canzone più bella (1957)
- Pezzo, capopezzo e capitano (1958) - Alberto
- Adorabili e bugiarde (1958) - Nando
- Maid, Thief and Guard (1958) - Franco
- Vite perdute (1959) - Toni
- Pensione Edelweiss (1959) - Le peintre
- The Black Chapel (1959) - Pater Orlando
- Terror of the Red Mask (1960) - Ivano
- The Savage Innocents (1960) - Missionary
- Il principe fusto (1960)
- Gli avventurieri dei tropici (1960)
- The Night They Killed Rasputin (1960)
- Mill of the Stone Women (1960) - Ralf
- Cavalcata selvaggia (1960)
- The Story of Joseph and His Brethren (1961) - Judah, Joseph's Brother
- Planets Against Us (1962) - Capt. Carboni
- The Carpet of Horror (1962) - Inspector Webster
- Family Diary (1962)
- Seven Seas to Calais (1962) - Fletcher
- Imperial Venus (1962) - Junot
- Tempo di credere (1962)
- Luciano, una vita bruciata (1962)
- Noche de verano (1963) - Enrique
- The Visit (1964) - Police Officer Chesco (uncredited)
- Una sporca guerra (1965)
- Berlino appuntamento per le spie (Operazione Polifemo) (1965) - Kurt
- Secret Agent Super Dragon (1966) - Professor Kurge
- Si muore solo una volta (1967) - John Malsky
- The Looters (1967) - Dietrich
- The Stranger Returns (1967) - The Preacher
- Bandidos (1967) - Kramer
- Anyone Can Play (1967) - Berto, Esmerelda's husband
- Run, Man, Run (1968) - Colonel Michel Sévigny
- The Battle of El Alamein (1969) - Capt. Hubert
- Plagio (1969)
- Probabilità zero (1969) - Captain Kreuz
- Revenge (1969) - Philip
- Un gioco per Eveline (1971) - Phillipe Giraud
- Our Lady of Lust (1972) - Prof. Paolo
- The Godfather's Advisor (1973) - Don Calogero Micheli
- Società a responsabilità molto limitata (1973) - Commissario di polizia
- 24 ore... non un minuto di più (1973) - General Perez
- Last Days of Mussolini (1974)
- La minorenne (1974) - Massimo Sanna
- How to Kill a Judge (1975) - State Prosecutor Alberto Traini-Luiz
- Nick the Sting (1976) - Will Leffern (uncredited)
- The Cynic, the Rat and the Fist (1977) - Marchetti
- The Greatest Battle (1978) - Capt. Fitzpatrick
- Candido Erotico (1978) - Paul / Husband
- La guerra sul fronte Est (1981)
- Canto d'amore (1982)
- Un uomo di razza (1989) - Tommasi
- Blu notte (1992) - (final film role)
