= Duel of the Titans =

- Italian film poster
- Directed by: Sergio Corbucci
- Screenplay by: Luciano Martino; Franco Rossetti; Duccio Tessari; Sergio Leone
- Story by: Luciano Martino; Sergio Corbucci; Sergio Leone
- Produced by: Tonino Cervi; Alessandro Jacovini
- Starring: Steve Reeves; Gordon Scott; Virna Lisi; Franco Volpi; Laura Solari
- Cinematography: Enzo Barboni
- Edited by: Gabriele Varriale
- Music by: Piero Piccioni
- Production companies: Titanus; Ajace Produzioni Cinematografiche; Societe Nouvelle Pathe Cinema; Societe Generale de Cinematographie
- Distributed by: Paramount Pictures
- Release date: 6 December 1961 (Italy)
- Running time: 108 minutes
- Countries: Italy; France
- Language: Italian
- Box office: $1,450,000 (US/ Canada)

Duel of the Titans (Italian: Romolo e Remo, lit. 'Romulus and Remus') is a 1961 Italian / French film directed by Sergio Corbucci and starring Steve Reeves, Gordon Scott, and Virna Lisi. The film, based on the legend of Romulus and Remus, depicts twin brothers who revolt against tyranny in pre-Roman Italy and then come to a parting of the ways as they lead their people toward the founding of a new city, known as Rome.

== Plot ==
Born of a God and a mortal, two babies are abandoned to a river. Nurtured by a wolf, they are later recovered by a shepherd. Romulus (Reeves) and Remus (Scott) grow up to lead a band of thieves in an effort to eliminate two cruel Kings—Amulias and Nemulias, the King of the Sabines. After 20 years, the two twins are briefly reunited with their mother. Before she dies, she tells her sons that they are destined to be the founders of a great city.

Later after having fallen in love with the daughter of Nemulias, Romulus is unaware of his brother's ambitions as Remus steadily succumbs to the temptations of power and greed. King Tasius pursues the brothers and their followers both to retrieve his daughter as well as avenge the destruction of his city of Alba Longa. Soon, a rift develops between the two siblings, leading to a death duel between both sons of the Gods to determine the true founder of Rome.

== Cast ==
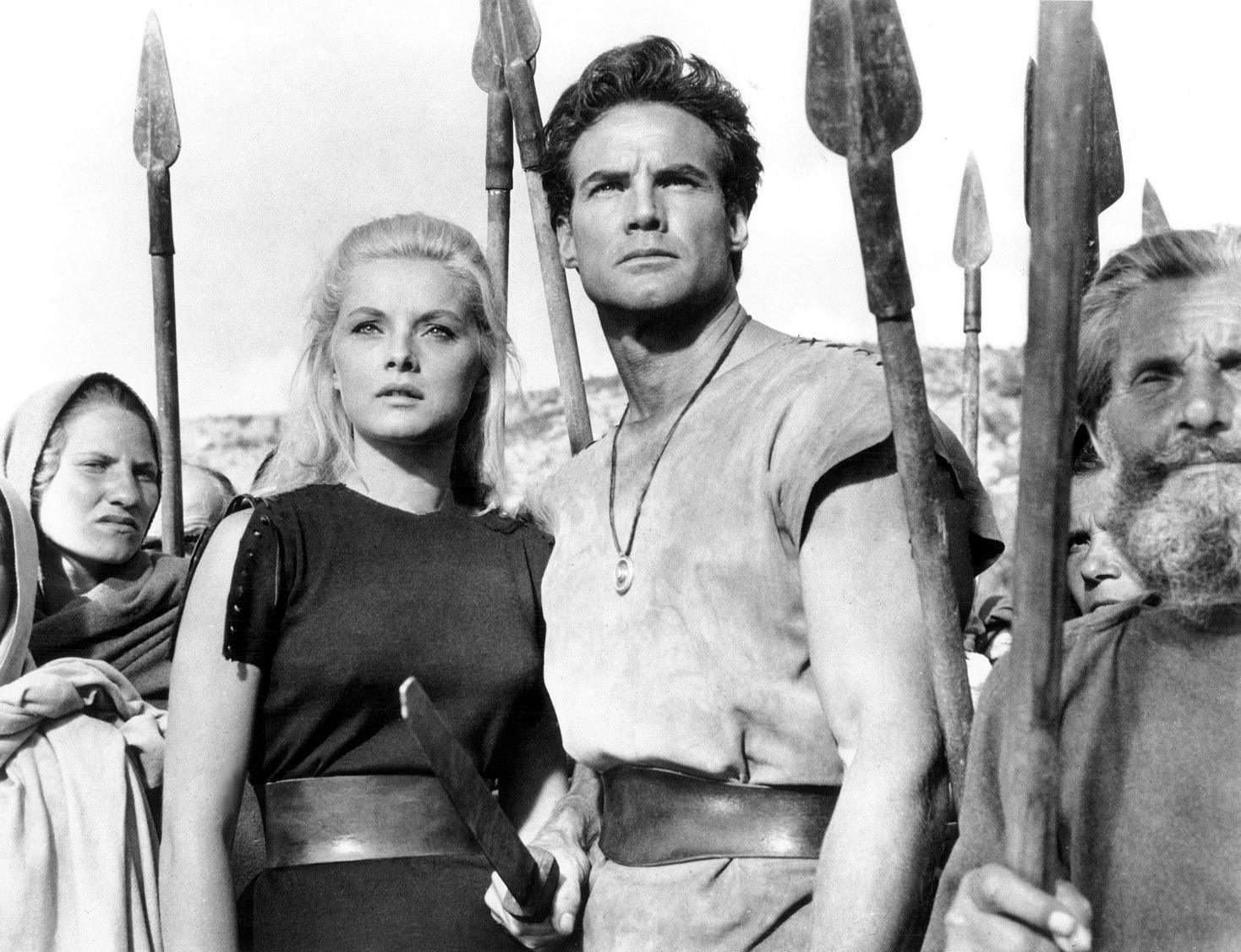
Virna Lisi and Steve Reeves in a scene of the film

- Steve Reeves as Romulus
- Gordon Scott as Remus
- Virna Lisi as Julia
- Massimo Girotti as Tasius Nemulias
- Jacques Sernas as Cursias
- Ornella Vanoni as Tarpea
- Franco Volpi as Amulias
- Piero Lulli as Sulpicius
- Laura Solari as Rea Silvia
- José Greci as Estia
- Inger Milton as Sira
- Enzo Cerusico as Numa
- Andrea Bosic as Faustulus
- Gianni Musy as Archer
- Enrico Glori as Citizen of Alba
- Germano Longo as Scebro
- Giuliano Dell'Ovo as Publio
- Franco Balducci as Acilio
- Nando Angelini as Roman Soldier
- Mimmo Poli as Shepherd

== Production ==
The film was conceived by Sergio Leone, shortly after he collaborated on the screenplay of The Seven Revenges. Leone was offered the direction but declined, backing Corbucci in return for Corbucci's earlier backing on The Last Days of Pompeii.

== Release ==
The film was released in Italy on 6 December 1961 with a 108-minute running time. It was a box office success, grossing about 712 million lire. It was released in the United States as Duel of the Titans in an 89-minute running time in June 1963.

== See also ==
- List of historical drama films
- List of films set in ancient Rome
- Romulus & Remus: The First King
