= Night of the Serpent =

1969 film

- Directed by: Giulio Petroni
- Written by: Fulvio Gicca Palli; Giulio Petroni
- Produced by: Gianni Minervini
- Starring: Luke Askew; Luigi Pistilli; Magda Konopka; Franco Balducci; Luciano Casamonica; Chelo Alonso; Guglielmo Spoletini; Benito Stefanelli; Giancarlo Badessi
- Cinematography: Mario Vulpiani; Silvio Fraschetti
- Edited by: Antonietta Zita
- Music by: Riz Ortolani
- Release date: 1969
- Country: Italy

Night of the Serpent (Italian: La notte dei serpenti), also known as Nest of Vipers, is a 1969 Italian spaghetti Western film co-written and directed by Giulio Petroni and starring Luke Askew, Luigi Pistilli, Magda Konopka, Giancarlo Badessi and Chelo Alonso.

== Plot ==
In a remote Mexican villa, during the country's Revolution, a group of townsmen (the town's Alcalde, the town's bartender, the town's priest and the town's prostitute) conspire to rob child orphan Manuel of his inheritance, since they are all Manuel's relatives and his estranged father, who was living in USA, recently died and left a lot of money to his son, with the group keeping the information a secret after accidentally killing the mailman who was carrying the documents.

After he finds out about the "nest of vipers" and their scheme to get Manuel's inheritance, Hernandez, the corrupt Lieutenant of the Mexican army's garrison in the villa, joins the group of conspirators as their leader and devises a new plan with the intention of framing an innocent man for the future murder of the boy. Meanwhile the American Luke, an alcoholic ex-gunslinger who is living in Mexico and suffering from a traumatic and unspoken past, is chosen by the revolutionary and small-time bandit General Pancaldo, who is a friend of Hernandez, to be an unwitting pawn in the conspirators' plan. However, after befriending Manuel and finding out about the vipers' intention of killing both the boy and his adoptive mother María, Luke decides to get back into shape leaving alcohol and facing the conspirators and the Mexican army head on.

== Cast ==
- Luke Askew as Luke
- Luigi Pistilli as Lt. 'The Snake' Hernandez
- Magda Konopka as Maria
- Chelo Alonso as Dolores
- Guglielmo Spoletini as General Pancaldo (credited as William Bogart)
- Franco Balducci as Luciano
- Giancarlo Badessi as Ignacio
- Luciano Casamonica as Manuel
- Mónica Miguel as Ignacio's wife
- Franco Valobra as Jesus Maria
- Benito Stefanelli as Pancho
- Clara Colosimo as Mercedes

== Production ==
The film was shot between Almeria, Cinecittà, and De Paolis Studios in Rome. Franco Bottari served as production designer, while Franco Lo Cascio was second unit director.

== Reception ==
While film director Giulio Petroni was generally dismissive of the film, several critics praised it, notably Spanish film critic Carlos Aguilar, who deemed the film as Petroni's best, and one of his favorite spaghetti westerns. Film critic Eugenio Ercolani described the film as "fierce and tense", and noted the strong giallo influences in the script.
