= Marcello Ciorciolini =

Italian composer

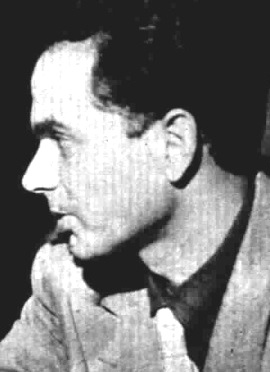
- Born: 16 January 1922; Rome, Italy
- Died: 5 September 2011 (aged 89); Rome, Italy
- Occupation: Director

Marcello Ciorciolini (16 January 1922 – 5 September 2011) was an Italian screenwriter, director, playwright, television and radio author and lyricist.

== Life and career ==
Born in Rome, Ciorciolini began his career in 1950 as a radio writer, often collaborating with Alberto Talegalli. Shorty later he entered the cinema industry as a screenwriter, specializing in the comedy genre and also directing a number of films.

As a lyricist he was the author of several hits, notably Mina's "Una zebra a pois" and "Ti guarderò nel cuore", the theme song of Mondo cane. Between the 1970s and 1980s he was mainly active as an author of television variety shows. On stage, he was active as an author of revues and comedy plays, and more sporadically of dramas.

Ciorciolini was one of the favourite authors of the comic duo Franco and Ciccio, with whom he collaborated in television, cinema and even for some songs.

== Selected filmography ==
Screenwriter

- Il coraggio (1955)
- Terror of the Red Mask (1960)
- The Huns (1960)
- The Vengeance of Ursus (1961)
- Two Mafiamen in the Far West (1964)
- I due toreri (1965)
- Two Mafiosi Against Goldfinger (1965)
- Two Sergeants of General Custer (1965)
- Red Roses for Angelica (1966)
- Two Sons of Ringo (1966)

Director and screenwriter

- Con rispetto parlando (1965)
- Black Box Affair (1966)
- I barbieri di Sicilia (1967)
- Tom Dollar (1967)
- Ciccio Forgives, I Don't (1968)
- The Nephews of Zorro (1968)
- Indovina chi viene a merenda? (1969)
- Meo Patacca (1972)
