= Guns of the Black Witch =

1961 film

- Directed by: Domenico Paolella
- Screenplay by: Luciano Martino; Ugo Guerra; Ernesto Gastaldi
- Produced by: Fortunato Misiano
- Cinematography: Carlo Bellero
- Edited by: Jolanda Benvenuti
- Music by: Michele Cozzoli
- Production companies: Romana Film; Societe Nouvelle de Cinematographie (SNC)
- Release date: February 24, 1961 (Italy)
- Running time: 98 minutes
- Countries: Italy; France

Guns of the Black Witch (Italian: Il terrore dei mari) is a 1961 adventure film directed by Domenico Paolella.

== Cast ==
- Don Megowan: Jean
- Silvana Pampanini: Delores
- Emma Danieli: Elisa
- Livio Lorenzon: Guzman
- Germano Longo: Michel
- Loris Gizzi: Governor
- Philippe Hersent: Jean's Stepfather

== Release ==
Guns of the Black Witch was released in Italy on 24 February 1961. It was released in the United States in December 1961.

== Reception ==
The Monthly Film Bulletin declared the film to be a "very tepid affair" and that "even the Caribbean looks unenticing in this representation, and Paolella's direction makes heavy weather of the action."

== See also ==
- List of Italian films of 1961
