= The Avenger (1962 film) =

1962 film

- Directed by: Giorgio Venturini
- Screenplay by: Ugo Liberatore; Luigi Mangini; Arrigo Montanari; Nino Stresa; Albert Band; Giuseppe Abbrecia
- Based on: Aeneis by Publius Vergilius Maro
- Produced by: Giorgio Venturini; Albert Band
- Starring: Steve Reeves; Giacomo Rossi Stuart; Carla Marlier
- Cinematography: Angelo Lotti
- Edited by: Antonietta Zita
- Music by: Giovanni Fusco
- Production companies: Mercury Films; La Société des Films Sirius; CICC; Avala Film
- Release date: 28 November 1962 (Italy)
- Running time: 95 minutes
- Countries: Italy; France; Yugoslavia

The Avenger (Italian: La leggenda di Enea, lit. 'The Legend of Aeneas') is a 1962 sword-and-sandal film directed by Giorgio Venturini. In the movie, based on Virgil's Aeneid, Aeneas leads escaped survivors of the Trojan War to new land in Italy.

== Cast ==
- Steve Reeves as Enea (Aeneas)
- Carla Marlier as Lavinia, Latino's Daughter
- Liana Orfei as Camilla, Queen of the Volsci
- Giacomo Rossi-Stuart as Eurialo (Euryalus)
- Gianni Garko as Turno (Turnus), King of the Rusalie (Rutuli)
- Mario Ferrari as King Latino (Latinus)
- Lulla Selli as Queen Amata, Latino's Wife
- Maurice Poli as Mesenzio (Mezentius), Turno's Henchman
- Luciano Benetti as Sergesto (Sergestus)
- Pietro Capanna as Bisia
- Enzo Fiermonte as Acate (Achates)
- Charles Band as Julio (Ascanius)
- Benito Stefanelli as Niso (Nisus)
- Nerio Bernardi as Drance
- Adriano Vitale as Dancer
- Walter Zappolini as Dancer
- Robert Bettoni as Pallante (Pallas)

== Release ==
The Avenger was released in Italy on 28 November 1962 with a running time of 95 minutes. It was released in the United States in June 1965 with a 105-minute running time.

== See also ==
- List of historical drama films
- List of French films of 1962
- List of Italian films of 1962
