= Pirates of the Coast =

1960 film

- Directed by: Domenico Paolella
- Written by: Luciano Martino
- Produced by: Fortunato Misiano
- Starring: Lex Barker
- Cinematography: Augusto Tiezzi
- Edited by: Jolanda Benvenuti
- Music by: Michele Cozzoli
- Release date: 1 December 1960
- Country: Italy
- Language: Italian

Pirates of the Coast (Italian: I pirati della costa, also known as Pirates of the Barbary Coast) is a 1960 Italian adventure film directed by Domenico Paolella.

== Cast ==
- Lex Barker as Luis Monterey
- Estella Blain as Isabella
- Livio Lorenzon as Olonese
- Liana Orfei as Anna del Peru
- Loris Gizzi as Don Fernando
- John Kitzmiller as Rock
- Nino Vingelli as Porro
- Ignazio Balsamo as Brook
- Gérard Landry as The Prosecutor
