= The Pirate and the Slave Girl =

- Directed by: Piero Pierotti
- Written by: Luciano Martino; Piero Pierotti; Bruno Rasia
- Produced by: Fortunato Misiano
- Starring: Lex Barker; Chelo Alonso
- Cinematography: Augusto Tiezzi
- Music by: Michele Cozzoli
- Release date: 1959
- Country: Italy
- Language: Italian

The Pirate and the Slave Girl (Italian: La scimitarra del Saraceno, also known as The Pirate's Captive) is a 1959 Italian adventure film written and directed by Piero Pierotti and starring Lex Barker and Chelo Alonso.

== Plot ==
Captain Drakut, called the "Dragon", is a ruthless Saracen pirate who makes the Mediterranean unsafe with his ship. On his forays, he hijacks ships and kidnaps the women captured on the ships to later sell them as slaves to Turkish human traffickers in North Africa. The rogue pirate only becomes weak when it comes to one woman: the glow-eyed princess Miriam, ruler of a desert tribe of Arabs. One day, Drakut makes a crucial mistake when he raids the "San Luca" and kidnaps Bianca, who is traveling with him. She is the daughter of the governor of Rhodes, which currently belongs to the Republic of Venice. There were also several secret papers from the Doge of Venice on board. The governor is in dire need, as he has to assume that his Bianca could also be bartered away to some lecherous Arab despot. But he is lucky in his misfortune, because Roberto Diego, a notorious adventurer and son of the once-feared "Red Corsair," offers his father his help.

Diego has just been sentenced to incarceration because of high debts, but is willing to risk his life to save the beautiful little daughter and the secret documents for the good of Bianca and the Doge of Venice if his sentence is released. However, the governor has no idea that Roberto has very personal motives for bringing himself up as a rescuer and liberator. Because Roberto still has a score to settle with Drakut, he was once responsible for the death of Roberto's father. The governor agrees to this bargain, and Diego joins Drakut's crew on board. In the Catalan painter, Francesco, he found his only ally. As a newcomer on board, Roberto must be conscientious because people are suspicious of him. Drakut's right-hand man, the brutal Gamal, notices and flogs the Red Corsair's son when he tries to flirt with Bianca. Soon, the general emotional chaos puts the whole rescue operation in danger, because Roberto falls in love with Drakut's hostage, Bianca. In contrast, Miriam, the pirate captain's lover, falls in love with Roberto.

Arriving on North Africa's shores, Drakut travels on to an oasis. Miriam is the sole ruler here so far. Drakut, who once owed her his life, also has other reasons for being on good terms with Miriam, since he hopes to rule over her desert kingdom one day. In order to get rid of the annoying competitor for the favor of the exotic beauty, Drakut uses an opportunity to let Roberto die of thirst on the way to the oasis. But he is brave and tough enough to fight his way through to the saving goal. Diego begins to play a double game: on the one hand he loves the kidnapped Bianca, but he also keeps Miriam warm because he needs her help for his plan to finally put an end to Drakut. In fact, Roberto's battle plan succeeds: he can save the kidnapped girls from the hands of greedy Turkish slave traders, wins Bianca's heart en passant and achieves that Drakut sinks in the sea with his pirate ship, which is set on fire, together with Miriam, who was killed in battle.

== Cast ==
- Lex Barker as The Dragon Drakut
- Chelo Alonso as Princess Miriam
- Massimo Serato as Roberto Diego
- Graziella Granata as Bianca
- Luigi Tosi as Francisco
- Bruno Corelli as Selim
- Michele Malaspina as Governor of Rhodes
- Anna Arena as Zaira
- Enzo Maggio as Candela
- Daniele Vargas as Gamal
- Franco Fantasia as Captain Volan
- Ignazio Balsamo
- Ubaldo Lay
- Gianni Rizzo
- Ugo Sasso
- Erminio Spalla
- Amedeo Trilli
