= Giustino Durano =

Italian film actor (1923–2002)

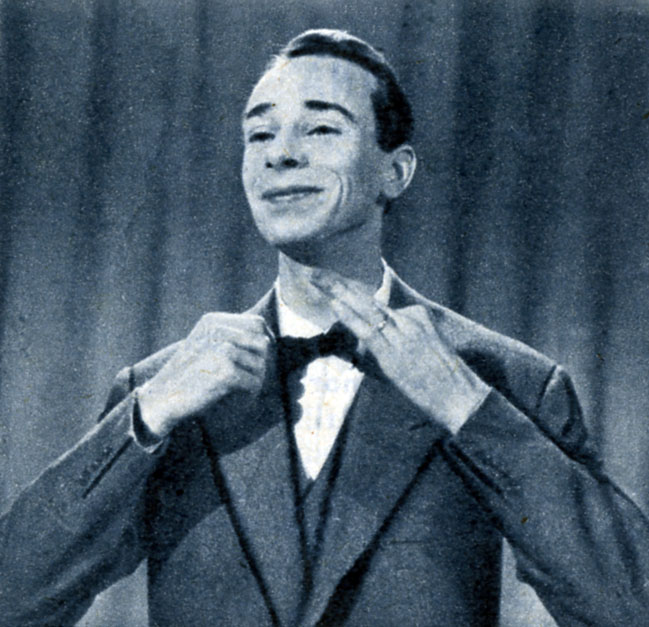
- Durano on stage in 1955
- Born: 5 May 1923; Brindisi, Apulia, Kingdom of Italy
- Died: 18 February 2002 (aged 78); Bologna, Emilia-Romagna, Italy
- Occupation: Actor
- Years active: 1954–2001

Giustino Durano (5 May 1923 – 18 February 2002) was an Italian actor best known for his work as Eliseo Orefice in the 1997 film Life Is Beautiful. For his role, he was nominated in part for a Screen Actors Guild Award for Outstanding Performance by a Cast.

== Life Is Beautiful ==
The movie is centered on his nephew Guido and his son Giosuè. In the movie, he is the head waiter of a hotel dining room. As racial turmoil begins erupting in Italy against Jews, the waiter, his nephew and the nephew's son are taken to a concentration camp. While at the camp, he was separated from his nephew and later killed in a gas chamber along with several other elderly people.

== Death ==
Durano died in 2002 after a long battle with cancer.

== Partial filmography ==
- Red and Black (1955)
- Lucky to Be a Woman (1956) - Federico Frotta
- Lo svitato (1956)
- Tipi da spiaggia (1959) - Nick Balmora
- Queen of the Pirates (1960) - Battista, the Count's Manservant
- Accroche-toi, y'a du vent! (1961) - Un malvivente
- Cronache del '22 (1961)
- Rage of the Buccaneers (1961) - Juan
- Freddy and the Millionaire (1961) - Polizist
- The Golden Arrow (1962) - Absent-Minded genie
- Imperial Venus (1962) - Bousque
- Tutto è musica (1963) - Kurt
- Follie d'estate (1963) - Pianista
- Vino, whisky e acqua salata (1963)
- Male Companion (1964) - Le boulanger / A Baker (uncredited)
- Me, Me, Me... and the Others (1966) - Policeman
- After the Fox (1966) - Critic
- The Bobo (1967) - Druggist (uncredited)
- Come rubare un quintale di diamanti in Russia (1967) - Roland
- Bang Bang Kid (1967) - Hotchkiss
- Le lys de mer (1969)
- The Balloon Vendor (1974) - Receptionist
- Salvo D'Acquisto (1974) - Riccardo
- La vita è bella (1997) - Eliseo Orefice
- Fate un bel sorriso (2000) - Antonio
- Amici ahrarara (2001) - Zio Giannangelo
- Andata e ritorno (2003) - Sig. Sorelli (final film role)
