= Michele Cozzoli =

Italian composer

- Born: 3 May 1915; Naples, Italy
- Died: 31 August 1961 (aged 46); Rome, Italy
- Occupation: Musician

Michele Cozzoli (3 May 1915 – 31 August 1961) was an Italian composer, conductor, and arranger. He is best known for his work in film score composition and orchestral arrangements, which contributed significantly to Italian cinema. Cozzoli’s career spanned several decades, during which he collaborated with notable filmmakers and artists of his time.

== Biography ==
Born in Naples, Cozzoli studied piano and violin under the composer Raffaele Caravaglios. After the military service, he made his professional debut as a conductor, before focusing into composing and arranging music for films and revues.

Cozzoli was also a songwriter, and some of his compositions participated to the Festival di Napoli and to the Sanremo Music Festival.

== Selected filmography ==
- Falsehood (1952)
- Torna! (1953)
- The White Angel (1955)
- Sunset in Naples (1955)
- Sangue di zingara (1956)
- Mermaid of Naples (1956)
- Serenata a Maria (1957)
- Oh! Sabella (1957)
- Il Conte di Matera (1957)
- Cavalier in Devil's Castle (1959)
- World of Miracles (1959)
- The Pirate and the Slave Girl (1959)
- Pirates of the Coast (1960)
- Le signore (1960)
- Knight of 100 Faces (1960)
- Sword in the Shadows (1961)
- Guns of the Black Witch (1961)
