= Herbert A.E. Böhme =

German actor (1897–1984)

- Born: 7 September 1897; Breslau, Silesia, German Empire
- Died: 29 June 1984 (aged 86); Hamburg, West Germany
- Occupation: Actor
- Years active: 1936–1974

Herbert Albert Emil Böhme (7 September 1897 – 29 June 1984) was a German film and television actor.

== Selected filmography ==
- The Traitor (1936)
- Ein Mädchen geht an Land (1938)
- Pour le Mérite (1938)
- Legion Condor (1939)
- Ein Robinson (1940)
- Riding for Germany (1941)
- Above All Else in the World (1941)
- Fritze Bollmann wollte angeln (1943)
- Die heimlichen Bräute (1944)
- Kolberg (1945)
- I'll Never Forget That Night (1949)
- Thirteen Under One Hat (1950)
- Only One Night (1950)
- The Guilt of Doctor Homma (1951)
- Der Weg zu Dir (1952)
- Elephant Fury (1953)
- Winter in the Woods (1956)
- Captain Falcon (1958)
- Knight of 100 Faces (1960)
- Mill of the Stone Women (1960)
- The Puzzle of the Red Orchid (1962)
