= Un gioco per Eveline =

- Directed by: Marcello Avallone
- Screenplay by: Marco Guglielmi; Stefano Calanchi; Marcello Avallone
- Story by: Augusto Guglielmi
- Produced by: Ernesto Di Fresco
- Starring: Emma Costantino; Adriana Nicolescu; Marco Guglielmi
- Cinematography: Aldo Scavarda
- Edited by: Paolo Lucignani
- Music by: Marcello Giombini
- Production company: Diva Cinematografica
- Distributed by: Panta Cinematografica
- Release date: 16 July 1971 (Italy)
- Running time: 85 minutes
- Country: Italy

Un gioco per Eveline (transl. A Game for Eveline) is a 1971 Italian film directed by Marcello Avallone.

== Production ==
Director Marcello Avallone described his original desire for the film to make a film related to "the Fantastic, I wrote a 'noir', a genre we rarely did in Italy." Italian film historian and critic Roberto Curti stated that the film was not a film noir, but a ghost story. According to Erna Schurer, the film was funded by "a mafioso...he used to pay us by putting money inside a newspaper, I remember him coming over in weekends, carrying these small packages..."

The film was shot in Mondello, Sicilly in 1969.

== Release ==
It took two years before Un gioco per Eveline was submitted to the Italian Board of Censors. was distributed theatrically in Italy by Panta Cinematografica on 16 July 1971. The film grossed a total of 43,833,000 Italian lire on its domestic release. Avallone was so disappointed by the results of the film, that he gave up on film and returned to television documentaries until the film Cugine mie in 1976.
