= Our Husbands =

1966 film

- Film poster
- Directed by: Luigi Filippo D'Amico; Dino Risi; Luigi Zampa
- Written by: Agenore Incrocci; Mario Monicelli; Furio Scarpelli
- Produced by: Gianni Hecht Lucari
- Starring: Alberto Sordi
- Music by: Armando Trovajoli
- Release date: 1966
- Running time: 105 minutes
- Country: Italy
- Language: Italian

Our Husbands (Italian: I nostri mariti) is a 1966 Italian anthology comedy film directed by Luigi Filippo D'Amico, Dino Risi and Luigi Zampa.

== Cast ==
- Alberto Sordi - Giovanni Lo Verso (segment "Il marito di Roberta")
- Ugo Tognazzi - Carabiniere (segment "Il Marito di Attilia ovvero nei Secoli Fedeli")
- Jean-Claude Brialy - Ottavio (segment "Il Marito di Olga")
- Michèle Mercier - Olga (segment "Il Marito di Olga")
- Akim Tamiroff - Cesare (segment "Il Marito di Olga")
- Lando Buzzanca - Ragionier Malanzin (segment "Il Marito di Olga")
- Nicoletta Machiavelli - Roberta (segment "Il marito di Roberta")
- Liana Orfei - Attilia (segment "Il Marito di Attilia ovvero nei Secoli Fedeli")
- Elena Nicolai - Giovanni's mother-in-law (segment "Il marito di Roberta")
- Claudio Gora - The Doctor (segment "Il marito di Roberta")
