= Mistress of the World =

- German poster for part 1 of the film
- Directed by: William Dieterle; Richard Angst (uncredited)
- Screenplay by: Jo Eisinger; Harald G. Petersson
- Based on: Die Herrin der Welt by Karl Figdor
- Produced by: Artur Brauner
- Starring: Martha Hyer; Carlos Thompson; Micheline Presle; Wolfg. Preiss; Sabu; Lino Ventura; Carl Lange; Leon Askin; Inkijinoff; Gino Cervi
- Cinematography: Richard Angst
- Edited by: Ira Oberberg
- Music by: Roman Vlad
- Production companies: CCC Filmproduktion GmbH; Franco-London-Films S.A.; Continental Produzione
- Distributed by: UFA
- Release date: 14 April 1960 (Hamburg)
- Countries: West Germany; France; Italy

Mistress of the World (German: Die Herrin der Welt, French: Les mystères d'Angkor, Italian: Il mistero dei tre continenti) is a 1960 multinational European science fiction spy film remake of the 1919 eight-part silent film The Mistress of the World directed by William Dieterle and starring Martha Hyer and Carlos Thompson. It marked the comeback in his native country of the director William Dieterle after several decades spent in Hollywood. In West Germany, it was released in a longer version split in two parts (Die Herrin der Welt - Teil I and Die Herrin der Welt - Teil II).

== Plot ==
With his secret research, the Swedish physicist Professor Johanson, head of the Nuclear Physics Institute, has succeeded in obtaining bundled energy from nuclear fusion. This formula could revolutionize the world, with it enormous amounts of energy could be released. Sweden's secret service sends its top agent Peter Lundström to shadow the scientist and possibly protect him from kidnappers. Lundstrom follows Johanson's heels and meets his attractive, blonde daughter Karin, who works as her father's assistant. After the effectiveness of Johanson's method can be proven for the first time in an explosion and Johanson has to be transferred to the hospital injured as a result of the widespread destruction, a group of sinister, international profiteers and conspirators to develop a keen interest in this invention. Professor Johanson is in grave danger.

Karin is now continuing her father's research and is also caught in the cross hairs of the mysterious opponents. Johanson himself retreats to a Cambodian monastery in order to escape the gangsters' shots and recover. Meanwhile, the international criminals manage to steal Johanson's energy formula. Karin then goes after the thieves, supported by Lundstrom. But he also has his own goals. The hunt takes them around the world. It soon turns out that a certain Madame Latour is behind the sinister machinations. Eventually old Johanson falls into her hands. In Southeast Asia, a showdown ensues between the kidnappers and Lundstrom and Karin. ( from German Wiki - Herrin der Welt )

== Cast ==
- Martha Hyer as Karin Johanson
- Carlos Thompson as Peter Lundström
- Micheline Presle as Madame Latour
- Sabu as Dr. Lin-Chor
- Gino Cervi as Professor Johanson
- Lino Ventura as Biamonte
- Wolfgang Preiss as Dr. Henrik Brandes
- Carl Lange as Berakov
- Leon Askin as Fernando
- Inkijinoff as Priest
- Hans Nielsen as Colonel Dagget
- Charles Regnier as Norvald
- Rolf von Nauckhoff as Dalkin
- Jean-Claude Michel as Ballard
- Carlo Giustini as John
- Georges Rivière as Logan
- Jochen Blume as Bertrand
- Wolfgang Kühne as Arzt

== Production ==
Mistress of the World was developed when producer Artur Brauner invested in a three-hour West German-French-Italian co-production. Brauner contracted William Dieterle to direct the film. The film was made with a predominantly German crew, but with a multi-national cast including Martha Hyer and Sabu from Hollywood, Carlos Thompson from Argentina and Gino Cervi from Italy, and Micheline Presle and Lino Ventura from France.

The film was shot between September 1959 and January 1960. The film shot around the world, including Macau, Angkor, Nice, Hong Kong, Naples, Nepal, Sweden, Bangkok, and the Spandau Studios in Berlin. While filming in Indochina, Dieterle left the production, leaving cinematographer Richard Angst to take over directing.

== Release ==
The first part of Mistress of the World was released in Hamburg on 14 April 1960. The second part was released on 26 April 1960.

== Reception ==
The film was not received well by critics in West Germany on its release.

== See also ==
- List of science fiction films of the 1960s
- List of German films of the 1960s
- List of French films of 1960
- List of Italian films of 1960
