= Valérie Lagrange =

French actress and singer (born 1942)

- Born: 25 February 1942 (age 84); Paris, France
- Other name: Daniele Charaudeau
- Occupations: Actress, Singer
- Years active: 1959—present

Valérie Lagrange (born 25 February 1942) is a French actress and singer. She starred in the 1960 adventure film Morgan, the Pirate.

== Selected filmography ==
- The Green Mare (1959)
- Morgan, the Pirate (1960)
- The Corsican Brothers (1961)
- Hardi Pardaillan! (1964)
- Up to His Ears (1965)
- A Man and a Woman (1966)
- My Love, My Love (1967)
- Weekend (1967)
- Satyricon (1969 Polidoro film)
- La Vallée (1972)
- My Nights Are More Beautiful Than Your Days (1989)
- Queen to Play (2009)
- On My Way (2013)

== Selected discography ==
- 1966 Valérie Lagrange LP
- 1980 Valérie Lagrange LP
- 1981 Chez moi LP
- 1983 Les Trottoirs de l'éternité LP
- 1985 Rebelle LP
- 1987 Compilation CD
- 1988 Moitié ange - moitié démon (Best of) CD
- 1998 L'Intégrale 2CD
- 2003 Fleuve Congo CD

== Bibliography ==
- Hughes, Howard. Cinema Italiano: The Complete Guide from Classics to Cult. I.B.Tauris, 2011.
