= Steve Reeves =

American bodybuilder and actor (1926–2000)

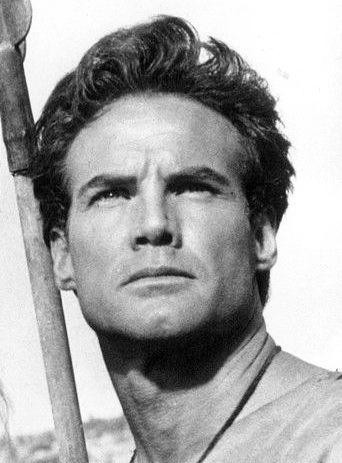
- Reeves in Duel of the Titans (1961)
- Born: Stephen Lester Reeves; January 21, 1926; Glasgow, Montana, U.S.
- Died: May 1, 2000 (aged 74); Escondido, California, U.S.
- Occupations: Bodybuilder; actor
- Years active: 1949–1968
- Spouses: Sandra Smith (m. 1955; div. 1956) Aline Czartjarwicz (m. 1963; died 1989) Deborah Ann Engelhorn (m. 1994)

Stephen Lester Reeves (January 21, 1926 – May 1, 2000) was an American professional bodybuilder and actor. He was famous in the mid-1950s as a movie star in Italian-made sword-and-sandal films, playing muscular protagonists such as Hercules, Aeneas, and Sandokan. At the peak of his career, he was the highest-paid actor in Europe. Though best known for his portrayal of Hercules, he played the character only twice: in Hercules (1958), and in its 1959 sequel Hercules Unchained. By 1960, Reeves was ranked as the number-one box-office draw in 25 countries.

Prior to his acting career, Reeves was a professional bodybuilder. Known for his symmetry, he reigned as Mr. America of 1947, Mr. World of 1948, and Mr. Universe of 1950 in the pre-Mr. Olympia era. Credited with popularising bodybuilding on a global level, he is regarded as one of the most influential bodybuilders of all time. He wrote three books on bodybuilding and physical training.

== Early life ==
Born in Glasgow, Montana, on January 21, 1926, Reeves moved to California at age 10 with his mother, Goldie Reeves, after his father, Lester Dell Reeves, died in a farming accident. Reeves developed an interest in bodybuilding at Castlemont High School and trained at Ed Yarick's gym in Oakland, California. After graduating from high school, he enlisted in the United States Army during World War II, and served in the Philippines. After his military service Reeves attended California Chiropractic College in San Francisco.

== Bodybuilding career ==
As a bodybuilder, Reeves trained three days a week. Every workout was a full-body workout, as opposed to a split workout. He did the standard three sets of 8 to 12 repetitions per exercise. During training he had no regard for time but worked until he had completed his routine, which took any time from two to four hours. He reigned as Mr. America of 1947, Mr. World of 1948, and Mr. Universe of 1950 in the pre–Mr. Olympia era. He was contacted by an agent who suggested he go into acting.

Reeves wrote the book Powerwalking and two self-published books, Building the Classic Physique - The Natural Way and Dynamic Muscle Building. George Helmer published a revised and updated edition of the Powerwalking book in 2013.

== Acting career ==
=== Career beginning ===
Reeves moved to New York where he studied acting under Stella Adler, but after arguments he was refunded his tuition. He studied instead at the Theodora Irvin School of the Theatre. He began performing a vaudeville act with a comedian named Dick Burney. One of Cecil B. De Mille's talent scouts saw him and had him tested for Samson and Delilah (1949). Reeves received a seven-year contract with Paramount. Reeves stated that De Mille wanted to cast him in the lead role, but told Reeves he had to lose 15 pounds in order to look convincing on-camera. Reeves says he tried to lose the weight and worked on his acting in preparation for the role over three months. Then, De Mille told him he was going to give the role to Victor Mature.

=== Early acting appearances ===
In 1949, Reeves filmed a Tarzan-type television pilot called Kimbar of the Jungle, and in 1950 he became Mr. Universe. He appeared on television in Stars Over Hollywood in the episode "Prison Doctor" with Raymond Burr. He appeared on the TV series Topper (in the episode "Reducing").

In 1954, Reeves had a small supporting role as a policeman in the Ed Wood film Jail Bait. It was his first film and earned him his Screen Actors Guild card. "I had a suit on at all times," he later recalled. "I even had a tie. Only took my shirt off once. Those were the days, huh?"

The same year Reeves was in the MGM musical Athena, playing the would-be boyfriend of Jane Powell's character.

Reeves guest-starred on The George Burns and Gracie Allen Show as the owner of a gym. In 1955, Reeves appeared in two Broadway shows, Kismet and The Vamp. He had a costume test for the lead in Li'l Abner (1959) but lost the part to Peter Palmer. He worked for American Health Studios in public relations, opening up fitness studios. That same year he married his first wife, Sandra Smith.

=== Hercules ===
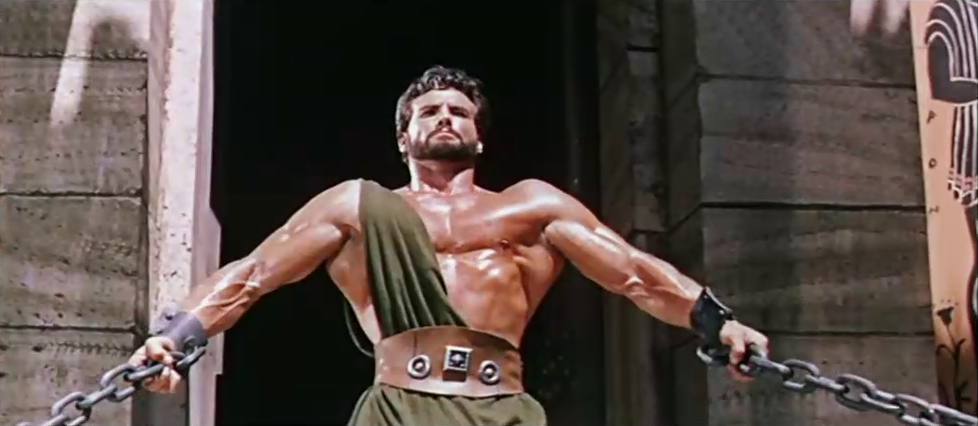
Steve Reeves in Hercules

In Italy, director Pietro Francisci wanted to make a film about Hercules but could not find anyone suitable to play the role. His daughter recommended Reeves on the basis of his appearance in Athena and Francisci offered him the role and a plane ticket to Italy. Reeves at first did not think he was serious but eventually agreed and flew to Italy to make the film. His fee was $10,000. Hercules was a relatively low-budget epic based loosely on the tales of Jason and the Argonauts, though inserting Hercules into the lead role.

The film proved popular in Europe. What made it an international sensation was that US distribution rights were bought by Joseph E. Levine, who promoted it and turned it into a major box-office success, grossing $5 million in the United States in 1959. However this did not happen until Reeves had already made four more films in Europe.

The first was a sequel to Hercules, Hercules Unchained (1959), again directed by Francisci. Reeves was paid the same fee, although his wage would double from then on. This film was another huge success, being the third most popular film in Britain in 1960. Nonetheless Reeves would not play Hercules again, despite his identification with the role. Reeves's third film as star was The White Warrior (1959), based on Hadji Murat, the novel by Leo Tolstoy. He played Hadji Murad, a 19th-century Avar naib who led his warriors in raids against the Russians invading his homelands in the North Caucasus (modern-day Dagestan and Chechnya).

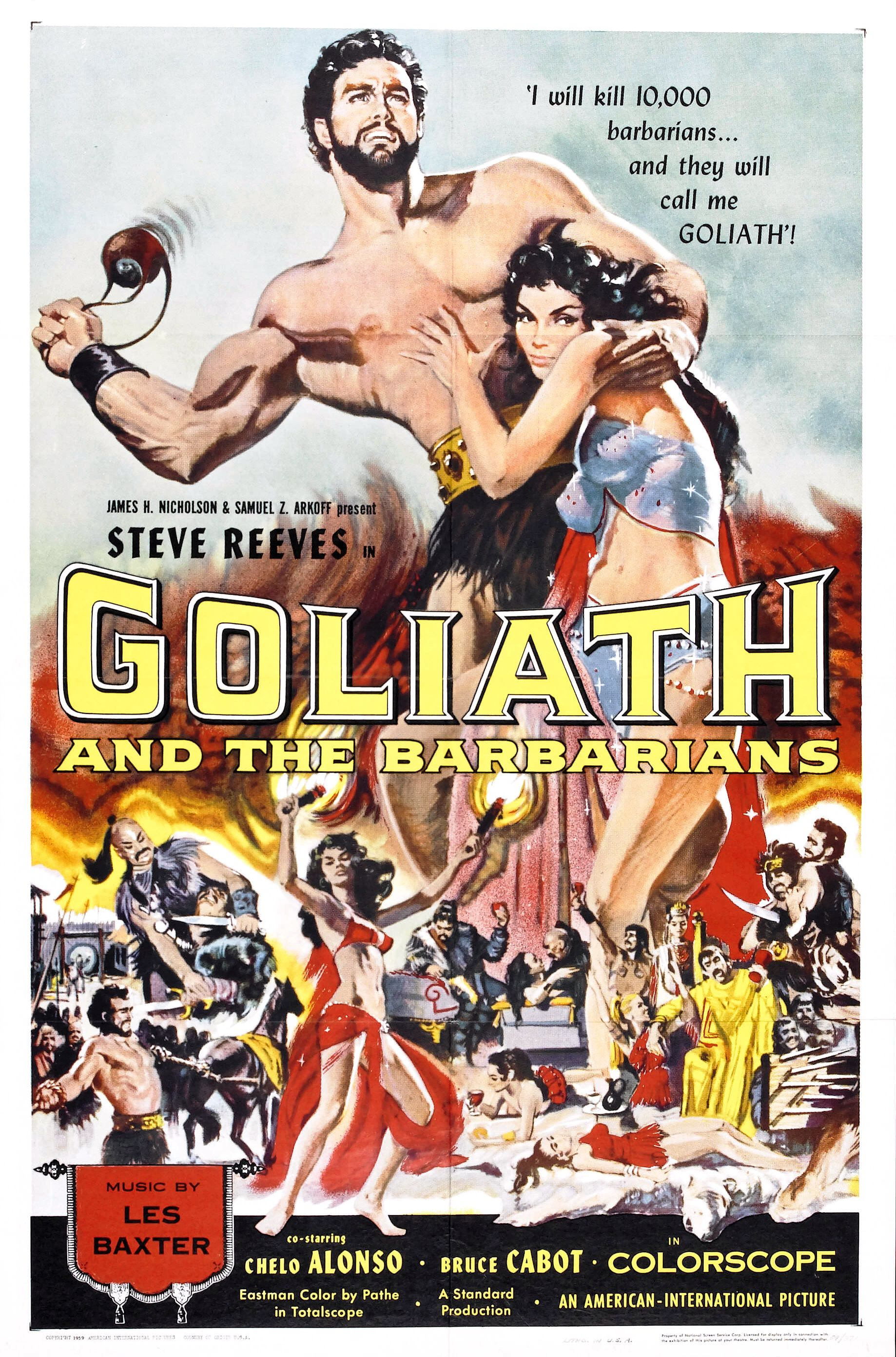
Goliath and the Barbarians, a film poster by Reynold Brown

Reeves played Emiliano in Terror of the Barbarians, about the Lombard invasion of Italy. American International Pictures bought US rights and retitled it Goliath and the Barbarians (1959), with Reeves's character renamed "Goliath". The film earned $1.6 million in North America during its initial release, when it was double billed with Sign of the Gladiator.

=== Injury ===
Reeves portrayed Glaucus Leto in The Last Days of Pompeii (1959), based on the novel by Sir Edward Bulwer-Lytton. It co-starred Christine Kaufmann and Fernando Rey and was mostly directed by Sergio Leone. During the filming, Reeves dislocated his shoulder when his chariot slammed into a tree; he re-injured it while swimming in a subsequent underwater escape scene. The injury would be aggravated by his stunt work in each successive film, ultimately leading to his retirement from filmmaking.

=== American directors ===
Reeves followed this with The Giant of Marathon (1959) where he was cast as Pheidippides, the famous wartime messenger of the Battle of Marathon. By now Reeves's success was such that his films would use Hollywood directors: Marathon was directed by Mario Bava and Jacques Tourneur. According to MGM records the film earned $1,335,000 in the US and Canada and $1.4 million elsewhere resulting in a profit of $429,000.

Reeves had a change of pace in Morgan the Pirate (1960) where he played pirate and occasional governor of Jamaica, Captain Henry Morgan. Andre de Toth and Primo Zeglio directed. He then did an "Eastern", The Thief of Baghdad (1961), playing Karim, directed by Arthur Lubin. In The Trojan Horse (film) (1961) Reeves played Aeneas of Troy, opposite John Drew Barrymore. He co-starred with his fellow body builder Gordon Scott in Duel of the Titans (1961), the two playing Romulus and Remus respectively. Sergio Corbucci directed. Reeves played Randus, the son of Spartacus, in The Slave (1962) then reprised his role as Aeneas in The Avenger (1962) (a.k.a. The Legend of Aeneas).

=== Later roles ===
Reeves played Sandokan in two films, both directed by Umberto Lenzi: Sandokan the Great (1963) and Pirates of Malaysia (1964). Reeves said that by this stage his fee was $250,000 a film. In 1968, Reeves appeared in his final film, a spaghetti Western he co-wrote, titled I Live For Your Death! (later released as A Long Ride From Hell). "I ended up with an ulcer from that," he said later. "That was my last."

Reeves reportedly turned down the James Bond role in Dr. No (1962) because of the low salary the producers offered. Reeves also declined the role that finally went to Clint Eastwood in A Fistful of Dollars (1964) because he did not believe that Italians could make a western out of a Japanese samurai film.

George Pal contacted Reeves for the role of Doc Savage in Doc Savage: The Man of Bronze, the first of what was meant to be a film series, but when filming was about to begin a Hollywood writers' strike put the film on hold with Reeves and the original director replaced. Reeves's last screen appearance was in 2000 when he appeared as himself in the made-for-television A&E Biography: Arnold Schwarzenegger – Flex Appeal.

=== Post-acting ===
Reeves decided to retire for several reasons: stress, his injury, and the decline in the market for his sort of movies. He had earned enough to retire and moved to the 360-acre (150 ha) Suncrest Stock Ranch he purchased in Jacksonville just outside of Medford, Oregon – 33 miles (53 km) north of the California border. He later purchased a ranch in Valley Center, California. It would be his home for the rest of his life. Reeves bred horses and promoted drug-free bodybuilding. The last two decades of his life were spent in Valley Center, where he lived with his second wife, Aline, until her death in 1989.

== Other interests ==
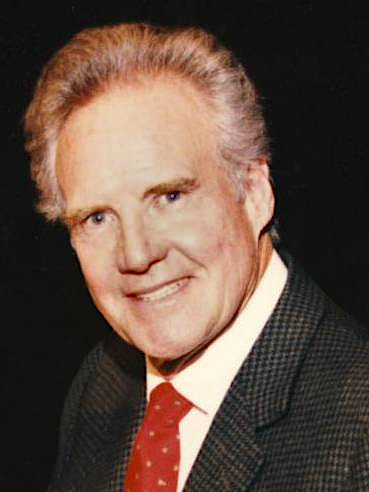
Reeves in 1990

Reeves's only authorized biography, Steve Reeves – One of a Kind, was published in 1983 by Milton T. Moore. Moore worked with Reeves and Steve's wife at the time, Aline, for over 12 years before receiving publishing approval. Reeves was reportedly to promote the book at public appearances.

In 1991, the writer Chris LeClaire began writing and researching Steve Reeves's life and career for a biography. In 1999, LeClaire published Worlds To Conquer, which LeClaire described as an authorized biography.

In 1994, Reeves, with his long-time friend and business partner George Helmer, started the Steve Reeves International Society.

Rod Labbe, a freelance writer, interviewed Reeves in 1997, and the article appeared in Films of the Golden Age magazine, summer 2011.

== Death ==
Reeves had exploratory surgery late Friday afternoon on April 28, 2000, while being treated for lymphoma, and died shortly before noon from a blood clot on Monday, May 1, 2000. He died at Palomar Hospital in Escondido, California, where his second wife had also died.

== Filmography ==
| Year | Title | Role | Notes |
|---|---|---|---|
| 1953 | Gentlemen Prefer Blondes | Olympic Team Member | Uncredited |
| 1954 | Jail Bait | Lieutenant Bob Lawrence | Hollywood film directed by Ed Wood Jr. |
| 1954 | Athena | Ed Perkins | Hollywood film directed by Richard Thorpe |
| 1958 | Hercules | Hercules | released in Italy in 1958, released in U.S. in 1959; a.k.a. Le fatiche di Ercole / The Labors of Hercules |
| 1959 | Hercules Unchained | Hercules | released in USA 1960; a.k.a. Ercole e la regina di Lidia / Hercules and the Queen of Lydia |
| 1959 | The White Warrior | Hadji Murad | directed by Riccardo Freda; a.k.a. Hadji Murad il Diavolo Bianco / Hadji Murad, The White Devil |
| 1959 | Goliath and the Barbarians | Goliath (Note: Reeves's character is simply named Goliath, and not based on the biblical antagonist. In the Italian release, Reeves's character is named Emiliano.) | a.k.a. Il terrore dei barbari / Terror of the Barbarians |
| 1959 | The Last Days of Pompeii | Glaucus Leto | a.k.a. Gli ultimi giorni di Pompei / The Last Days of Pompeii |
| 1959 | The Giant of Marathon | Phillipides | a.k.a. La battaglia di Maratona / The Battle of Marathon |
| 1960 | Morgan, the Pirate | Henry Morgan | a.k.a. Morgan, il pirata/ Morgan, the Pirate |
| 1961 | The Thief of Baghdad | Karim | a.k.a. Il Ladro di Bagdad |
| 1961 | The Trojan Horse | Aeneas | a.k.a. La guerra di Troia/ The Trojan War |
| 1961 | Duel of the Titans | Romulus | a.k.a. Romolo e Remo / Romulus and Remus |
| 1962 | The Slave | Randus (son of Spartacus) | a.k.a. Il Figlio di Spartaco / Son of Spartacus |
| 1962 | The Avenger | Aeneas | a.k.a. La leggenda di Enea / The Legend of Aeneas) (also released as The Last Glory of Troy); it is a sequel to The Trojan Horse |
| 1963 | The Shortest Day | Himself | a.k.a. Il giorno più corto |
| 1963 | Sandokan the Great | Sandokan | directed by Umberto Lenzi; a.k.a. Sandokan, la tigre di Mompracem/ Sandokan, the Tiger of Mompracem |
| 1964 | Pirates of Malaysia | Sandokan | directed by Umberto Lenzi; a.k.a. I Pirati della Malesia; a.k.a. Sandokan, the Pirate of Malaysia / Pirates of the Seven Seas; this is a sequel to Sandokan the Great |
| 1968 | A Long Ride from Hell | Mike Sturges | spaghetti western directed by Camillo Brazzoni, produced and co-written by Steve Reeves; a.k.a. Vivo per la tua morte/ I Live for Your Death! |

== See also ==
- List of male professional bodybuilders
