= Atom Age Vampire =

1960 Italian horror film

- Theatrical release poster
- Seddok, l'erede di Satana
- Directed by: Anton Giulio Majano
- Screenplay by: Gino De Santis; Alberto Bevilacqua; Anton Giulio Majano
- Story by: Piero Monviso
- Produced by: Elio Ippolito Mellino
- Starring: Alberto Lupo; Susanne Loret; Sergio Fantoni
- Cinematography: Aldo Giordani
- Edited by: Gabriele Varriale
- Music by: Armando Trovajoli
- Production company: Lion's Films
- Distributed by: Film Selezione (Italy)
- Release date: August 16, 1960 (Italy)
- Running time: 105 minutes 87 minutes (US); 72 minutes (DVD)
- Country: Italy
- Box office: ₤90 million

Atom Age Vampire (Italian: Seddok, l'erede di Satana) is a 1960 Italian horror film directed by Anton Giulio Majano. Shot in black-and-white, the film was produced by Elio Ippolito Mellino and stars Alberto Lupo, Susanne Loret, and Sergio Fantoni set in France. Despite there being no vampires in the film, it was released in the US as Atom Age Vampire in 1963 in an 87-minute version. It was further shortened for English language DVD release.

== Plot ==
When a stripper (Susanne Loret) becomes disfigured in a car accident, a scientist (Dr. Levin, played by Alberto Lupo) develops a treatment to restore her beauty by injecting her with a special serum. While performing the procedure, however, he falls in love with her. As the treatment begins to fail, he determines to save her appearance, regardless of how many women he must kill for her sake.

Despite the implication of its American title, the film does not feature an actual vampire. The titular Seddok is the brilliant but deranged scientist Dr. Levin, mutated by a chemical formula created using radiation. Dr. Levin studied the effects of radiation on living tissue in post-Hiroshima Japan and made an imperfect and teratogenic serum, "Derma 25", which he later refined into the miraculous healing agent "Derma 28", which he uses to treat the heroine. When his supply of Derma 28 runs out, he realizes he must kill to obtain more, and injects himself with Derma 25 to become monstrous and remorseless, so that he may seek these victims without hesitation.

Because many of the murders take place near the docks where shiploads of Japanese refugees are arriving, and leave behind the victims' bodies with holes in the neck where Dr. Levin has extracted the glands, the refugees claim that a vampire (whom they call "Seddok", though this is not a Japanese name) is responsible for the attacks. During a meeting with police, a restored-to-humanity Dr. Levin speculates that the Hiroshima survivors' tales of a mutated killer are due to psychological strain from the radiation damage to their bodies. However, he also wonders aloud whether the "vampire" these witnesses describe might be a disturbed man wishing to be normal again.

== Cast ==
- Alberto Lupo as Prof. Alberto Levin
- Susanne Loret as Jeanette Moreneau
- Sergio Fantoni as Pierre Mornet
- Franca Parisi as Monique Riviere, Levin's assistant
- Andrea Scotti as a gardener
- Rina Franchetti as
- Roberto Bertea as Sacha
- Ivo Garrani as a commissioner
- Glamor Mora
- Gianna Piaz

== Production ==
Several reference books state the film was produced by Mario Bava, which is incorrect. The producer is Elio Ippolito Mellino under the alias of Mario Fava. The script for the film recalls Georges Franju's Eyes Without a Face, which had been released in Italy several months before Atom Age Vampire. The film was shot at Pisorno Studio in Tirrenia.

== Release ==
Atom Age Vampire was released in Italy on August 16, 1960, where it was distributed by Film Selezione. The Italian box office of Atom Age Vampire was described as "modest" by Robert Curti, author of Italian Gothic Horror Films, 1957-1969 where it grossed 90 million Italian lira. When it was released abroad, the film had been truncated to 87 minutes long. Many public domain copies of the film are cut to 69 minutes long. The film was released in the United States through Manson Distributing on May 29, 1963.

The film has been released on DVD in the United States by Alpha Video, Sinister Cinema, and AFA Entertainment.

== Reception ==
In Italy, a contemporary review in La Stampa gave a brief plot and stated neither the directing nor the actors (specifying Alberto Lupo, Susanne Loret, Sergio Fantoni and Ivo Garrani) make it any less absurd or clumsy. The Monthly Film Bulletin declared the film as "a standard, unimaginative treatment of the familiar "monster" theme" and that the film was "sluggish, banal, and of interest only to the most determined fan of the genre."

From retrospective reviews, Phil Hardy's book Science Fiction simply referred to the film as a "routine Italian offering". In his analysis of the film, Louis Paul described it as "an exploitative yet enjoyably trashy movie".

== Aftermath and influence ==
Following the release of the film, Anton Giulio Majano directed only one more film for theaters before moving on to work in television: The Corsican Brothers.

In 2009, animator Scott Bateman created a new version of the film by using its English soundtrack and pairing it with new animation.

In 2011, British artist Adam Roberts made Remake, a scene-for-scene reshoot of the original film using the dubbed English soundtrack, but minus the presence of any of the characters. The shots in this version generally follow the framing and focus but without a cast. The image of this version was intended to evoke a poor image quality copy of the film one would find on YouTube or a poor quality VHS.

== See also ==
- List of horror films of 1960
- List of Italian films of 1960
