= Fury of the Pagans =

- Directed by: Guido Malatesta
- Written by: Gino Mangini; Umberto Scarpelli
- Produced by: Mario Bartolini; Giulaino Simonetti
- Starring: Edmund Purdom; Rossana Podestà
- Cinematography: Vincenzo Seratrice
- Edited by: Roberto Giandalle; Mario Sansoni
- Music by: Guido Robuschi; Gian Stellari
- Distributed by: Columbia Pictures (USA)
- Release date: 27 October 1960 (Italy)
- Running time: 86 minutes
- Country: Italy
- Language: Italian

Fury of the Pagans (Italian: La furia dei barbari, also known as The Fury of the Barbarians and Toryok), is a 1960 Italian adventure film directed by Guido Malatesta.

== Cast ==
- Edmund Purdom: Toryok
- Rossana Podestà: Leonora
- Livio Lorenzon: Kovo
- Daniele Vargas: Napur
- Andrea Fantasia: Nogaric
- Vittoria Febbi: Daritza
- Raffaella Carrà: Maritza
- Ljubica Jovic: Kathrina
