= Morgan the Pirate (film) =

1960 film by Primo Zeglio, André de Toth

- Directed by: Primo Zeglio; André de Toth
- Screenplay by: Filippo Sanjust; André de Toth; Primo Zeglio
- Produced by: Joseph E. Levine
- Starring: Steve Reeves; Valérie Lagrange; Ivo Garrani; Chelo Alonso; Lidia Alfonsi
- Cinematography: Tonino Delli Colli
- Edited by: Maurizio Lucidi
- Music by: Franco Mannino
- Production companies: Adelphia Compagnia Cinematografica; Lux Film; Compagnie Cinematographique de France
- Distributed by: Metro-Goldwyn-Mayer
- Release date: 17 November 1960 (Italy)
- Running time: 95 minutes
- Countries: Italy; France
- Languages: Italian; English
- Box office: $1.2 million (US)

Morgan the Pirate (Italian: Morgan il pirata) is a 1960 Italian-French international co-production historical adventure film, directed by André de Toth and Primo Zeglio, and starring Steve Reeves as Sir Henry Morgan, the pirate who became the Lieutenant-Governor of Jamaica.

== Plot ==
In 1670, freeborn Welshman, Henry Morgan, is enslaved by the Spaniards in Panama and sold to Doña Inez, daughter of Governor Don José Guzmán. Morgan falls in love with his mistress, much to the dismay of her father, who punishes him by sentencing him to a life of hard labor aboard a Spanish galleon.

Morgan leads his fellow slaves in mutiny, takes command of the ship, and becomes a pirate, without knowing that Doña Inez was on board, on her way to Spain. She becomes his prisoner, but spurns him when he declares his love in Tortuga. Not long after, Morgan's daring exploits on the Spanish Main pique the interest of King Charles II of England, and Morgan agrees to attack only Spanish vessels in return for English ships and men.

Fearing for the security of Doña Inez, after the pirates discover her identity, he permits her to return to Panama. Once there, she warns Don José of Morgan's planned invasion, and the pirate ships are either easily sunk or routed by the alerted Spanish. Not giving up, Morgan leads his men overland and attacks the city from the rear. The maneuver succeeds, Panama falls to the pirates, and Doña Inez finally admits her love for Morgan.

== Cast ==
- Steve Reeves as Sir Henry Morgan
- Valérie Lagrange as Doña Inez
- Ivo Garrani as Governor Don José Guzmán
- Chelo Alonso as Concepción
- Lydia Alfonsi as Doña María
- Armand Mestral as François l'Olonnais
- Giulio Bosetti as Sir Thomas Modyford
- Angelo Zanolli as David
- George Ardisson as Walter

== Release ==
Morgan the Pirate was released in Italy on 17 November 1960. It was released in the United States on 6 July 1961 with a 93-minute running time.

== Reception ==
Turner Classic Movies' Jeff Stafford writes, "Largely due to de Toth's direction, Morgan the Pirate is a lively, fast-paced entertainment with moments of tongue-in-cheek humor that is several notches in quality above the usual turgid, Italian-made spectacle. The striking cinematography, filmed in garish Eastmancolor, is by the award-winning Tonino Delli Colli who has lensed such art house classics as Pasolini's The Gospel According to St. Matthew (1964), Marco Bellocchio's China Is Near (1967), and Sergio Leone's Once Upon a Time in the West (1968). And the amusing, Ravel-inspired score by Franco Mannino strikes the perfect mock-epic tone. Among the more memorable set pieces are an exotic voodoo dance performed by Cuban sex bomb Chelo Alonso (a former dancer at the Folies Bergère in Paris), a battle at sea in which Morgan's men, disguised as women, storm a Spanish galleon in full drag, and the bloody, climactic sacking of Panama with shootings, stabbings and explosions galore."
