= Gastone (film) =

1960 film by Mario Bonnard

- Directed by: Mario Bonnard
- Screenplay by: Oreste Biancoli; Mario Bonnard; Rodolfo Sonego
- Story by: Ettore Maria Margadonna; Luciana Corda
- Produced by: Mario Cecchi Gori
- Starring: Alberto Sordi; Anna Maria Ferrero; Vittorio De Sica
- Cinematography: Luciano Trasatti
- Edited by: Eraldo Da Roma
- Music by: Angelo Francesco Lavagnino
- Distributed by: Variety Distribution
- Release date: 1961
- Language: Italian

Gastone is a 1960 Italian comedy film co-written and directed by Mario Bonnard and starring Alberto Sordi, Anna Maria Ferrero and Vittorio De Sica. It is loosely based on the Ettore Petrolini's character and comedy play with the same name.

== Plot ==
Italy, 1920s. The suffered glimmers of war seem very far away, especially if and when you have the opportunity to have fun in places like the tabarin: it is here that Gastone, a.k.a. Gaston Le Beau, profession danseur mondain, accompanied by the inseparable tailcoat, performs dancing with extreme elegance and entertains the wealthy ladies who go there.

Enclosed in the magnificent image of "bell'Adone", a woman-wasting dancer, elegant and sexy, Gastone is actually a frivolous and artless character, a well-known scammer at the police station who not only cares about being desired by the admirers but wants something else: success, that full glory and never achieved due to the outbreak of the Great War. Surrounded by equally fatuous and in some cases dishonest characters, including princes, loan sharks and beautiful women, Gastone cultivates his ambitions when a new student, Nannina, enrolls in his improvised dance school. It is not just a young and beautiful girl employed as a maid with nobles, but an excellent dancer, ambitious and determined. With her, Gaston deludes himself that he has finally found the new star of the club, the perfect dance partner. But, upon entering the scene, Gaston is suddenly taken to the police station for a complaint and Nannina, now known as Anna La Belle, performs alone and has a huge consensus.

Thus began, a little by chance and a lot for talent and with the help of a famous impresario, the new solo career of Nannina, able in a short time to reach the highest fame performing in the most famous theaters and clubs in Europe. Missing the opportunity, Gaston proves unable to realize that the public's tastes have changed and that his glossy world is on the way to sunset. Now forgotten, disheartened and penniless, Gaston looks for the last chance by returning to perform in a second-rate club with Rosa, an old flame always devoted. But the last performance turns out to be a total fiasco and the bel danseur, reduced to poverty, has only a vain consolation left: to see Nannina again perhaps for one last time, thus leaving the scene convinced that he is, always and in any case, the most beautiful and desired.

== Cast ==
- Alberto Sordi as Gastone
- Anna Maria Ferrero as Nannina
- Vittorio De Sica as The Prince
- Paolo Stoppa as Achille
- Franca Marzi as Rosa
- Chelo Alonso as Carmencita
- Magali Noël as Sonia
- Tino Scotti as The Illusionist
- Angela Luce as Yvonne
- Nando Bruno as Michele
- Salvo Libassi as The Commissioner
- Mimmo Palmara as The Agent
- Mino Doro as Cavallini
- Linda Sini as Lucy
- Livio Lorenzon as Captain Negri
- Nanda Primavera as Donna Flora
- Anna Campori as The Singer
