= Queen of the Pirates =

The Queen of the Pirates
- Directed by: Mario Costa
- Screenplay by: John Byrne; Nino Stresa
- Story by: Kurt Nachmann; Rolf Olsen
- Produced by: Otavio Poggi
- Starring: Gianna Maria Canale
- Cinematography: Raffaele Masciocchi
- Edited by: Renato Cinquini
- Music by: Carlo Rustichelli
- Production company: MAX Film
- Distributed by: Euro International Films Columbia Pictures (USA)
- Release date: 26 August 1960 (Italy)
- Running time: 80 minutes
- Country: Italy

Queen of the Pirates (Italian: La Venere dei pirati) is a 1960 Italian film directed by Mario Costa.

It was followed by Tiger of the Seven Seas.

== Cast ==
- Gianna Maria Canale: Sandra
- Massimo Serato: Cesare Count of Santa Croce
- Scilla Gabel: Isabella
- Livio Lorenzon: Olandese, Pirate Chief
- Moira Orfei: Jana
- Paul Muller: Duke Zulian
- José Jaspe: Captain Mirko
- Giustino Durano: Battista

== Production ==
The film was partially shot at Monte Argentario, Grosseto in Tuscany, Italy.

== Release ==
The Queen of the Pirates was released in Italy on 26 August 1960. It was released in the United States on July 26, 1961, by Columbia Pictures.

== Footnotes ==
=== References ===
- Kinnard, Roy; Crnkovich, Tony (2017). Italian Sword and Sandal Films, 1908-1990. McFarland. ISBN 978-1476662916.
