= Terror of the Red Mask =

- Directed by: Luigi Capuano
- Written by: Marcello Ciorciolini; Vittorio Metz; Luigi Capuano; Roberto Gianviti
- Produced by: Jacopo Comin
- Starring: Lex Barker; Chelo Alonso
- Cinematography: Goffredo Bellisario
- Edited by: Antonietta Zita
- Music by: Carlo Innocenzi
- Production companies: De Paolis I.N.C.I.R. Jonia Film
- Distributed by: Independenti Regionali; Constantin Film (Germany)
- Release date: 23 January 1960
- Running time: 92 minutes
- Country: Italy
- Language: Italian

Terror of the Red Mask (Italian: Il terrore della maschera rossa) is a 1960 Italian swashbuckler film co-written and directed by Luigi Capuano and starring Lex Barker and Chelo Alonso.

It was shot at the De Paolis Studios in Rome. The film's sets were designed by the art director Giancarlo Bartolini Salimbeni.

== Cast ==
- Lex Barker as Marco
- Chelo Alonso as Karima
- Livio Lorenzon as Astolfo
- Liana Orfei as Jolanda
- Franco Fantasia as Egidio
- Elio Crovetto as Uguccione
- Enrico Glori
- Ugo Sasso as Capo Ribelle
- Bruno Scipioni as Ribelle
- Luigi Tosi as Martino
- Marco Guglielmi as Ivano
- Riccardo Billi as Fanello
