= The Huns (film) =

- Directed by: Sergio Grieco
- Screenplay by: Marcello Ciorciolini; Rate Furlan
- Story by: Eric Klaus
- Produced by: Carlo Lombardi
- Starring: Chelo Alonso; Jacques Sernas; Folco Lulli; Philippe Hersent
- Cinematography: Alfio Contini
- Edited by: Enzo Alfonzi
- Music by: Bruno Canfora
- Production companies: Columbus Films; Comptoir Francais du Film Production
- Release date: 5 October 1960 (Italy)
- Running time: 102 minutes
- Countries: Italy; France

The Huns (Italian: La regina dei tartari is a 1960 adventure film directed by Sergio Grieco and starring Chelo Alonso and Jacques Sernas about Attila the Hun.

== Cast ==
- Chelo Alonso as Tanya
- Jacques Sernas as Malok
- Folco Lulli as Igor
- Mario Petri as Timur
- Philippe Hersent as Kathierma
- Piero Lulli as Seikor
- Andrea Scotti as Chagatai
- Ciquita Coffelli as Oruska
- Pietro Tordi as Morobas
- Raf Baldassarre as Prisoner

== Release ==
The Huns was released in Italy on 5 October 1960. It was released in the United States on 14 November 1962.
