= Knight of 100 Faces =

- Directed by: Pino Mercanti
- Written by: Luigi Emmanuele; Sergio Sollima; Piero Pierotti
- Produced by: Fortunato Misiano
- Starring: Lex Barker; Liana Orfei
- Cinematography: Carlo Bellero
- Edited by: Jolanda Benvenuti
- Music by: Michele Cozzoli
- Production company: Romana Film
- Distributed by: Titanus
- Release date: 1960
- Language: Italian

Knight of 100 Faces (Italian: Il cavaliere dai cento volti) is a 1960 Italian swashbuckler historical film directed by Pino Mercanti and starring Lex Barker and Liana Orfei.

== Cast ==
- Lex Barker as Riccardo d'Arce
- Liana Orfei as Zuela
- Livio Lorenzon as Count Fosco Di Vallebruna
- Annie Alberti as Bianca di Pallanza
- Herbert A.E. Böhme as Duke Ambrogio Di Pallanza
- Tina Lattanzi as Ausonia
- Alvaro Piccardi as Ciro Di Pallanza
- Dina De Santis as Cinzia
- Franco Fantasia as Captain d'Argentero / Silver Knight
- Roberto Altamura as Rino
- Fedele Gentile as Giovanni
- Gérard Landry as Captain of the Guards
- Giovanni Vari as Quinto
- Giulio Battiferri as Bertuccio
- Ignazio Balsamo as Fosco's Servant
- Gianni Solaro as Judge Del Torneo
