= Sheba and the Gladiator =

- French film poster
- Directed by: Guido Brignone; Michelangelo Antonioni
- Screenplay by: Francesco De Feo; Sergio Leone; Giuseppe Mangione; Guido Brignone
- Story by: Francesco De Feo; Sergio Leone; Giuseppe Mangione; Guido Brignone
- Produced by: Enzo Merolle
- Starring: Anita Ekberg; Georges Marchal; Folco Lulli; Chelo Alonso
- Cinematography: Luciano Trasatti; Mario Bava
- Edited by: Nino Baragli
- Music by: Angelo Francesco Lavagnino
- Production companies: Giomer Film; Lux Film; Societe Cinematographicque Lyre; Tele Film GmbH; Dubrava Film; Filmiski Studio
- Release dates: 5 March 1959 (Italy); 2 October 1959 (West Germany)
- Running time: 98 minutes
- Countries: Italy; France; West Germany; Yugoslavia

Sheba and the Gladiator or Sign of the Gladiator (Italian: Nel Segno di Roma) is a 1959 historical drama film loosely pertaining to the Palmyrene Empire and its re-annexation back into the Roman Empire.

== Cast ==
- Anita Ekberg as Zenobia
- Georges Marchal as Consul Marcus Valerius
- Folco Lulli as Zemanzius
- Chelo Alonso as Erica
- Gino Cervi as Aurelian
- Jacques Sernas as Julianus
- Lorella De Luca as Batsheba
- Alberto Farnese as Marcello
- Mimmo Palmara as Lator

== Production ==
Sheba the Gladiator was shot in 1958. Director Guido Brignone fell ill during the production on the film leading to two other directors to enter the production to help complete it: Michelangelo Antonioni and Riccardo Freda. For Antonioni, he visited Brignone in the hospital and reported on what he filmed and received instructions for the next day. Freda was in charge shooting the battle scenes which he did with cinematographer Mario Bava and Antonioni working with cinematographer Luciano Trasatti shooting the indoor scenes. Other people credited to the film included Sergio Leone as a screenwriter.

Mimmo Palmara commented that Antonioni "couldn't care less" about the film and "didn't direct the actors." Freda had an argument with Palmara and unsuccessfully tried to court Chelo Alonso on set.

== Release ==
Sheba and the Gladiator was distributed in Italy on March 5, 1959. It was released in West Germany as Im Zeichen Roms on 2 October 1959.

American International Pictures acquired the American rights to the film and re-titled it Sign of the Gladiator (Sign of Rome "was a pretty dismal title" according to Samuel Z. Arkoff) and cut 18 minutes from the original running time. There was no gladiator in the film so they redubbed it to change the general played by Jacques Sernas into a gladiator.

It was released in September 1959 in the United States. American International Pictures added an end title song called "Xenobia" sung by Bill Lee which was released on AIP Records. The film grossed a total of $1.25 million in rentals. "We did quite well with the picture" said Samuel Z Arkoff.

Kine Weekly called it a "money maker" at the British box office in 1960.

== See also ==
- List of historical drama films
- List of films set in ancient Rome
- Crisis of the Third Century
