= Livio Lorenzon =

Italian actor

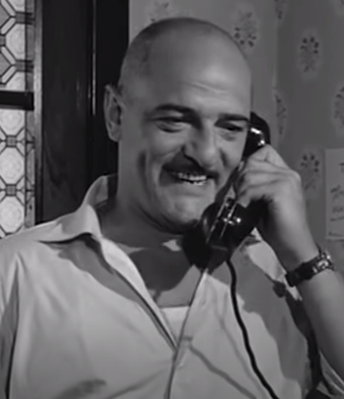
- Lorenzon in Il vedovo (1959)
- Born: 6 May 1923; Trieste, Kingdom of Italy
- Died: 23 December 1971 (aged 48); Latisana, Italy
- Occupation: Film actor
- Years active: 1950–1969

Livio Lorenzon (6 May 1923 – 23 December 1971) was an Italian actor who was mainly active during the 1950s and 1960s.

== Biography ==
He played minor roles in some memorable commedia all'Italiana movies directed by the likes of Dino Risi and Mario Monicelli.

On the international stage, Lorenzon is best known for his small roles in Spaghetti Western films in the 1960s, appearing in The Good, the Bad and the Ugly, and The Secret Seven in 1966.

Other genres he starred in were sword and sandal films and pirate films like Queen of the Pirates and Terror on the Seas.

He had a mature manliness in his demeanor, which made him believable in many disparate roles: clad in the sandals and lorica as a Roman centurion, donning a poncho and sombrero of a desperado or even as a "tough as nails" sergeant in World War I in La Grande Guerra.

Seldom if ever cast as a protagonist, Lorenzon made up by working hectic schedules, appearing in some 75 movies between 1952 and 1969. When he did appear in movies, his voice was re-dubbed by professional voice dubbers, especially Renato Turi.

== Death ==
He died in 1971 in Latisana in his native Friuli, of cirrhosis, aged 48.

== Selected filmography ==
- Shadows Over Trieste (1952) - Carmine
- Human Torpedoes (1954) - Sergente (uncredited)
- Bertoldo, Bertoldino e Cacasenno (1954)
- The Prince with the Red Mask (1955) - Monaldo
- Accadde tra le sbarre (1955) - Prisoner
- La catena dell'odio (1955)
- Storia di una minorenne (1956)
- El Alamein (1957) - Nardi
- The Dragon's Blood (1957)
- Slave Women of Corinth (1958) - La Spia
- The Day the Sky Exploded (1958) - British General
- Captain Falcon (1958) - Captain Manfredo
- Anche l'inferno trema (1958)
- Cavalier in Devil's Castle (1959) - Guidobaldo Fortebraccio
- The Son of the Red Corsair (1959) - José, pirata
- Goliath and the Barbarians (1959) - Igor
- L'arciere nero (1959) - Lodrosio
- The Great War (1959) - Sergente Barriferri
- Il terrore dell'Oklahoma (1959) - Duke Travis
- Il vedovo (1959) - Stucchi
- Attack of the Moors (1959) - Basirocco
- Terror of the Red Mask (1960) - Astolfo
- Le signore (1960) - Fabretti
- The Night They Killed Rasputin (1960)
- Knight of 100 Faces (1960) - Conte Fosco Di Vallebruna
- Queen of the Pirates (1960) - Pirate Chief
- La sceriffa (1960) - Jimmy Jesse
- Fury of the Pagans (1960) - Kovo
- Pirates of the Coast (1960) - Olonese
- Gastone (1960) - Captain Negri
- Cavalcata selvaggia (1960)
- Guns of the Black Witch (1961) - Guzman
- Revolt of the Mercenaries (1961) - Conte Keller Paroli
- Rome 1585 (1961)
- Revolt of the Mercenaries (1961)
- The Secret of the Black Falcon (1961) - Sergeant Rodriguez
- The Invincible Gladiator (1961) - Itus
- The Vengeance of Ursus (1961) - King Zagro (credit only)
- Sword in the Shadows (1961) - Capitano Mellina
- Pontius Pilate (1962) - Barabbas
- Venus Against the Son of Hercules (1962)
- Tharus Son of Attila (1962) - King Hatum
- Zorro alla corte di Spagna (1962) - Capitano Morales
- Gladiators 7 (1962) - Panurgus
- Zorro and the Three Musketeers (1963) - Porthos
- Goliath and the Sins of Babylon (1963) - Evandro
- Gli invincibili sette (1963) - Rubio
- Shivers in Summer (1964) - Giulio Cittelli
- Hercules Against Rome (1964) - Mansurio
- Queste pazze, pazze donne (1964) - Vismara ('Siciliani a Milano')
- Messalina vs. the Son of Hercules (1964) - Prefect of the court
- Two Escape from Sing Sing (1964) - Lemmy Tristano
- The Last Gun (1964) - Jess - Capobanda
- Samson and His Mighty Challenge (1964)
- Hercules and the Tyrants of Babylon (1964) - Salmanassar, Brother of Assur
- Gladiators Seven (1964) - Nemete
- Il figlio di Cleopatra (1964) - Petronio
- La vendetta dei gladiatori (1964) - Genserico il Vandalo
- Challenge of the Gladiator (1965) - Commodio
- La Colt è la mia legge (1965) - O'Brien's Henchman
- Colorado Charlie (1965) - Colorado Charlie
- Mondo pazzo... gente matta! (1966) - Impresario with moustache
- Gunman Called Nebraska (1966) - Sceriffo Bert
- Go with God, Gringo (1966) - Don Pedro
- Texas, Adios (1966) - Alcalde Miguel
- The Good, the Bad and the Ugly (1966) - Baker
- Master Stroke (1967) - Miguel
- Io non protesto, io amo (1967) - Barone Francesco Maria Calò
- Cjamango (1967) - Don Pablo
- 2 RRRingos no Texas (1967) - Union Captain
- Buckaroo: The Winchester Does Not Forgive (1967) - Lash
- Giurò... e li uccise ad uno ad uno... Piluk il timido (1968) - Dr. Burt Lucas
- Una forca per un bastardo (1968) - Foster
- Rita of the West (1968) - A dying man (uncredited)
- Don Chisciotte and Sancio Panza (1968) - Thief
- Torture Me But Kill Me with Kisses (1968) - Artemio Di Giovanni
- Ace High (1968) - Paco Rosa
- Crisantemi per un branco di carogne (1968)
- Colpo sensazionale al servizio del Sifar (1968) - Professor Antinori
- God Will Forgive My Pistol (1969) - Ramon Ramirez
- Agguato sul Bosforo (1969) - Hakim
- I 2 magnifici fresconi (1969) - Vismara (uncredited)
