= Aphrodite, Goddess of Love =

Aphrodite, Goddess of Love may refer to:

- Aphrodite, the ancient Greek goddess of love
- The Goddess of Love or Aphrodite, Goddess of Love, a 1957 film by Fernando Cerchio and Victor Tourjansky
- Slave Women of Corinth or Aphrodite, Goddess of Love, a 1958 film by Mario Bonnard
