= Dangerous Exile =

1957 English film by Brian Desmond Hurst

- Directed by: Brian Desmond Hurst
- Written by: Robin Estridge additional dialogue Patrick Kirwan
- Based on: A King Reluctant by Vaughan Wilkins
- Produced by: George H. Brown 'executive' Earl St. John
- Starring: Louis Jourdan; Keith Michell; Belinda Lee; Richard O'Sullivan
- Cinematography: Geoffrey Unsworth
- Edited by: Peter Bezencenet
- Music by: Georges Auric
- Production company: Rank Organisation Film Productions
- Distributed by: J. Arthur Rank
- Release dates: 12 December 1957 (UK); 10 October 1958 (US)
- Running time: 91 minutes
- Country: England
- Language: English

Dangerous Exile is a 1957 British historical drama film directed by Brian Desmond Hurst and starring Louis Jourdan, Belinda Lee, Anne Heywood and Richard O'Sullivan. It concerns the fate of Louis XVII, who died in 1795 as a boy, yet was popularly believed to have escaped from his French revolutionary captors.

== Plot ==
In 1795, the Duke Philippe de Beauvais smuggles his own son into the prison cell where Louis XVII is kept. Thus Louis XVII can escape unnoticed to England. Unfortunately the aerostat, steered by Duke Philippe de Beauvais, lands accidentally on a remote island. There an American spinster, Virginia Traill, takes care of the strange child. She finds the dauphin profoundly traumatised and not interested in becoming a king. Meanwhile, Louis' uncle Louis XVIII in Vienna has declared himself the new French king. In order to safeguard his claim on the throne, he sends assassins who shall murder the dauphin.

Being unaware of the exchange, he has Richard de Beauvais killed. But now the dauphin's torturers recognise that they have been deceived. Informed by a message of an English spy they send a ship to the island where the real dauphin hides. They attack the house of Virginia Traill and stop at nothing to detect the dauphin's hiding-place.

== Cast ==
- Louis Jourdan as the Duke Philippe de Beauvais
- Belinda Lee as Virginia Traill
- Keith Michell as Colonel Saint-Gérard
- Richard O'Sullivan as Louis XVII/Richard de Beauvais
- Martita Hunt as Lady Lydia Fell
- Finlay Currie as Monsieur Patient
- Anne Heywood as Glynis
- Jean Mercure as the police chef
- Jacques Brunius as De Chassagne
- Jean Claudio as De Castres, the comrade of Philippe à Paris
- Terence Longdon as Colonel Sir Frederick Venner

== Production ==
=== Development ===
The film was based on the novel A King Reluctant by Vaughan Wilkins, which was published in 1952. The New York Times called it "a rousing, colourful tale and historically convincing."

In February 1956 Rank announced A King Reluctant would be their expensive historical picture for the year with location filming to be done in Italy, Spain and the West Indies. Sir John Davis of Rank said "We cannot copy Hollywood's spectacular epics but we can provide good stories well-made - that is the answer to television competition." (Other historical spectacles made by Rank around this time included Robbery Under Arms, Campbell's Kingdom, The One That Got Away, Seven Thunders, Windom's Way, and The Gypsy and the Gentleman and The Wind Cannot Read.)

Pat Jackson said he was offered the film to direct but turned it down as "I thought it was absolutely terrible" and claims it turned out to be a "ghastly flop".

The female lead went to Belinda Lee. It was a key early performance from Anne Heywood.

=== Filming ===
The film was shot in Pinewood Studios and on location in Cornwall starting 11 March 1957. Lee was injured when her hair caught fire during a scene. Vyvyan Holland, son of Oscar Wilde, worked on the film as a historical adviser.

George Pollock was first assistant director. His work during filming impressed producer George Brown so much that the producer hired Pollock to direct Rooney.

== Release ==
The film premiered in London in December 1957 and went into general release the following month.

== Reception ==
The Manchester Guardian called the film "monstrous twaddle" with "just one merit - its beautifully colored photography".

Variety called it "a historical, cloak and dagger meller with all the typical excitements, absurdities, confusions, flashbacks, swordplay and general trimmings which invariably rear their cliche-ridden heads in such pictures. It won’t stand out in the memory of patrons as one of the best pix this year, but it will provide safe entertainment at most British cinemas."

The New York Times called it "a beautifully mounted tale" which "rarely comes to life, except in the superb, effectively colored period settings... Under Brian Desmond Hurst's rather unimaginative direction, the action simply lacks sustained suspense, instead of crawling with it... The lavish, meticulous castle interiors, the sweeping, azure-tinted coastal landscapes, and the murkiness of the Paris dungeons — all these have been woven into a striking background tapestry by Jack Maxsted, the art director."

Filmink argued "Louis Jourdan’s hero is a bit of a fanatic, and it probably doesn’t have enough action but there’s lots to admire. The movie does not seem to have been a commercial success."
