= Messalina (1960 film) =

- Directed by: Vittorio Cottafavi
- Screenplay by: Ennio De Concini; Mario Guerra; Carlo Romano; Duccio Tessari
- Story by: Ennio De Concini; Mario Guerra; Carlo Romano; Duccio Tessari
- Produced by: Erno Bistolfi
- Starring: Belinda Lee; Spiros Focas; Carlo Giustini; Giancarlo Sbraglia
- Cinematography: Marco Scarpelli
- Music by: Angelo Francesco Lavagnino
- Production company: Cineproduzione Erno Bistolfi
- Distributed by: Warner Bros.
- Release date: 12 March 1960 (Italy)
- Running time: 96 minutes
- Country: Italy
- Language: Italian
- Budget: slightly less than $1 million

Messalina (Italian: Messalina Venere imperatrice) is a 1960 Italian peplum film directed by Vittorio Cottafavi.

== Plot ==
After the death of the Roman Emperor Caligula, his paternal uncle Claudius is chosen to replace him. Claudius decides to take a new wife, the Vestal Virgin Messalina, the niece of Augustus Caesar.

The night before the wedding, Messalina murders a noble via poison. An assassin is sent to kill Messalina; she seduces him, has him killed and presents his severed head.

== Cast ==
- Belinda Lee as Valeria Messalina
- Spiros Focás as Lucius Maximus
- Carlo Giustini as Lucius Geta (as Carlo Justini)
- Giancarlo Sbragia as Aulo Celso (as Gian Carlo Sbragia)
- Arturo Dominici as Gaius Lilius
- Giulio Donnini as Narcissus
- Ida Galli as Silvia
- Mino Doro as Claudius
- Giuliano Gemma as Marcellus
- Annie Gorassini as Courtesan lover of Aulo Ceso
- Lia Angeleri as Vipidia
- Aroldo Tieri as Pirgo Pollinice
- Vittorio Congia as Ortotrago
- Paola Pitagora (as Paola Gargeloni)
- Bruno Scipioni

== Production ==
Belinda Lee's casting was announced in July 1959.

Messalina was shot at Cinecitta Studios in Rome in November-December 1959.

It was the first notable role for Giuliano Gemma.

== Release ==
Messalina was released in Italy on 12 March 1960 with a 96-minute running time. It was released in the United States in 1962 with an 84-minute running time.

== Reception ==
FilmInk called the film "The most fun of Lee’s European movies", "a silly sword and sandal epic with Lee having a high old time as the notorious empress, taking milk baths and seducing gladiators."

Film critic Gary Smith wrote that:

Of the many screen interpretations of Messalina this is probably the most satisfying due to the casting of Belinda Lee in the title role. This is not to suggest that Messalina is the most historically accurate or even the best produced version, but Belinda Lee’s pagan beauty seems to exude wantonness, and this is just the right quality needed for a successful portrayal of Rome’s most dissolute empress. Lee, who played a number of memorable screen temptresses in her brief film career, including Lucretia Borgia in The Nights of Lucretia Borgia and Potiphar’s wife in Joseph and His Brethren, had beauty and charisma.
