= A King Reluctant =

1952 novel

- First edition (UK)
- Author: Vaughan Wilkins
- Language: English
- Genre: Historical
- Publisher: Jonathan Cape; Macmillan (US)
- Publication date: 1952
- Publication place: United Kingdom
- Media type: Print

A King Reluctant is a 1952 historical adventure novel by the British writer Vaughan Wilkins. The plot revolves around the idea that the young Louis XVII, successor to his executed father, survived the French Revolution and turns up at Tenby on the Welsh coast.

== Film adaptation ==
In 1957 it was adapted into the film Dangerous Exile directed by Brian Desmond Hurst and starring Louis Jourdan, Keith Michell and Belinda Lee.

== Bibliography ==
- Goble, Alan. The Complete Index to Literary Sources in Film. Walter de Gruyter, 1999.
