= The Big Money (film) =

1958 British film by John Paddy Carstairs

- Movie Poster (1958)
- Directed by: John Paddy Carstairs
- Written by: John Baines additional material Patrick Campbell
- Based on: story by John Baines
- Produced by: Joseph Janni (uncredited) executive Earl St. John
- Starring: Ian Carmichael; Belinda Lee; Kathleen Harrison; Jill Ireland
- Cinematography: Jack Cardiff; Jack E. Cox
- Edited by: Alfred Roome
- Music by: Van Phillips
- Production company: The Rank Organisation
- Distributed by: Rank Film Distributors
- Release date: 10 June 1958
- Running time: 86 minutes
- Country: United Kingdom
- Language: English
- Budget: £160,000 or £175,000

The Big Money is a 1958 British comedy film directed by John Paddy Carstairs and starring Ian Carmichael, Belinda Lee and Kathleen Harrison.

== Plot ==
Willie is the bad seed of a family of thieves. One day, he steals a briefcase from a dodgy clergyman, which is full of pound notes. Unfortunately, the notes all have the same serial number. The clergyman is actually the leader of a separate criminal gang.

Willie is seduced by "the big money" and starts passing the counterfeits, one note at a time. Much of his need for money is to impress Gloria, the pretty barmaid at his local pub. She dreams of the millionaire who will come and give her the good life. Unfortunately, he cannot pass the fake money fast enough to keep up with her wants. When she helps herself to some of the counterfeit money, it gets the attention of the police and the mobsters. It all ends in a free-for-all, between the police, Arabs, and mobsters, in disguise. Finally, she has to decide whether she loves him or his money.

The Big Money (1958 Poster)

== Cast ==
- Ian Carmichael as Willie Frith
- Belinda Lee as Gloria
- Kathleen Harrison as Mrs. Frith
- Robert Helpmann as The Reverend
- James Hayter as Mr. Frith
- George Coulouris as The Colonel
- Renée Houston as Bobbie
- Michael Brennan as Bluey
- Jill Ireland as Doreen Frith
- Leslie Phillips as receptionist
- Harold Berens as bookmaker
- Hugh Morton as valet
- Ferdy Mayne as furrier
- Digby Wolfe as Harry Mason
- Michael Balfour as "Wilberforce"

== Production ==
The film was originally offered to Tony Hancock who turned it down (he had also turned down Jumping for Joy.)

Ian Carmichael had played a support role in the film of Simon and Laura (1955) for Rank and starred in a significant hit, Private's Progress, for the Boulting Brothers. This led to the Rank Organisation offering him a three-picture contract of which this was to be the first. Carmichael said the movie would be "a sad disappointment, and, after working in such close accord with John and Roy for twelve weeks, a frustrating and nail biting experience."

Diana Dors was originally cast as Gloria but turned down the role. Belinda Lee played the role instead. It was one of several comedies she made at Rank.

Filming took place at Pinewood in April 1956 and took ten weeks.

Carmichael says when he read the script he felt the premise was "a good one and the early sequences gave it a promising start" but that "very soon it descended into the broadest comedy cliches." He complained to the producer and director who did not share his concern so Carmichael "took the matter higher."

The Rank Organisation had employed Bryan Forbes as an in-house script doctor and staff writer and he was sent the screenplay. He and Carmichel spent two days working out an amended treatment and Forbes went to write up the scenes. The executive producer found out about this and pulled Forbes off the film – Carmichael says the movie was shot as per the original script.

=== Delayed release ===
The film's release was cancelled in July 1956 because Rank Organisation head Sir John Davis thought it was "terrible". "It would have been more harmful to the careers of the people in it to have it shown," said Davis in October. Filmink argued "We think that Rank simply went off comedy in 1956" and pulling the release of The Big Money "was a big deal for a penny pincher like" Davis.

Critic Alexander Walker described the film in 1993 as "almost indistinguishable from the general run of other Rank products." Carmichael, then making Brothers in Law said "all I can say is if the powers that be think the film is unfunny I'm relieved they're not going to show it." Helpmann said, "I applaud the courage of Mr Davis' decision but I can take no responsibility for the unfunniness of the film."

== Release ==
In 1958 producer Hugh Stewart was working on a Norman Wisdom movie that involved scenes at Ascot. The director, John Paddy Carstairs, remembered there were Ascot sequences in The Big Money and suggested Stewart look at it. The producer felt the film could be released with some additional editing and music.

Stewart said John Davis "told me that if I thought it was funny then we could try it out. It shows Belinda Lee has a real flair for comedy."

This led to a June 1958 release and screenings on Rank's Odeon circuit. Producer Joseph Janni took his name off the credits.

== Reception ==
Variety said, "all Stewart's labors cannot disguise the fact that Davis was right in the first place. Though sparking from an amusing idea, "The Big Money" is funny only in spots. It is bogged down by gag situations that are telegraphed, and feeble dialog... Though it may prove a modest filler in certain British houses, it will do nobody's reputation any good if it is entered for U.S. consumption."

Carmichael said that Stewart's "confidence was misplaced. The Big Money should have remained incarcerated or, better still, destroyed." It led to the termination of Rank's contract with Carmichael by mutual agreement. The actor wrote in his memoirs "I didn't like factory farming, which was what I assessed the film production at Pinewood to be at the time, and they, no doubt, didn't like my argumentative interference in a side of the production which they probably considered to be none of my affair. The fact that all along I had been wrong about The Big Money could also only have rankled."

Filmink argued "Robert Helpmann is fun as the villain... the movie had a strong idea (an innocent man in a criminal family) but stuffed its execution – like so many Rank movies, it’s badly written, with inadequate stars: Ian Carmichael is annoying and Belinda Lee...seems bored."

== Notes ==
- Carmichael, Ian (1980). Will the real Ian Carmichael – : an autobiography. Futura Publications.
