= Belinda Lee =

English actress (1935–1961)

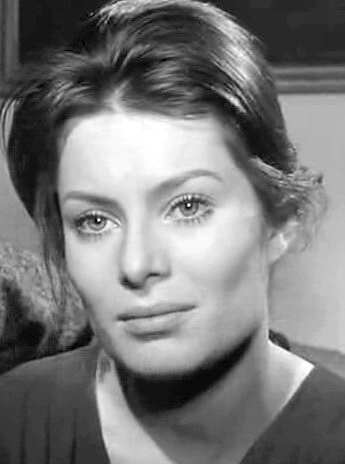
- Belinda Lee in Long Night in 1943 (1960)
- Born: 15 June 1935; Budleigh Salterton, Devon, England
- Died: 12 March 1961 (aged 25); San Bernardino, California, U.S.
- Occupation: Actress
- Years active: 1954–1961
- Spouse: Cornel Lucas (m. 1954; div. 1959)

Belinda Lee (15 June 1935 – 12 March 1961) was an English actress.

A profile for the British Film Institute's Screenonline website asserts: "of all the Rank Organisation's starlets, Belinda Lee stands out as the most notorious, yet paradoxically anonymous, British actress of the 1950s."

Often cast in demure roles in her early career, she was able to demonstrate her dramatic abilities, but she found more constant employment when she began to play "sexpot" roles. Typecast as one of several "sexy blondes", she was often compared, unfavourably, to the popular Diana Dors. Typical of these roles was a supporting part in the Benny Hill film Who Done It? (1956).

== Early life and career ==
Lee was born in Budleigh Salterton, Devon, England, to Robert Lee, a former British Army captain and owner of the Rosemullion Hotel, and Stella Mary Graham, a florist. She studied at St. Margaret's, a boarding school in Exeter in Devon, and then at the Tudor Arts Academy in Surrey. She was a self-described "spoiled only child" who wanted to be an actress from the age of nine.

Lee joined the Nottingham Playhouse repertory company for a year, then won a scholarship to the Royal Academy of Dramatic Art (RADA) in Bloomsbury in London. In 1953, Lee made her stage debut in a production of Point of Departure.

=== Early film roles ===
While at RADA, she was seen in a production of Lady Windermere's Fan and recommended to Val Guest, who was looking for a girl to play in support of comedian Frankie Howerd in The Runaway Bus (1954). (Eric and Blanche Glass were the ones who spotted her, according to one account.) According to The New York Times, she was the "seventy-seventh" girl to audition for the role and her casting was announced in September 1953. Lee played a dumb blonde and later said "I really was dumb too – didn't know where the camera was half the time."

For a time she shared a flat with Anna Kashfi. Guest arranged to have publicity photographs for The Runaway Bus taken by Rank's still photographer Cornel Lucas, whom Lee would marry in June 1954.

She had another small part in Meet Mr. Callaghan (1954), a B-picture crime drama for director Charles Saunders at Eros. Then Guest used her a second time in a small role in Life with the Lyons (1954), for Hammer Films. Filmink said the latter contained one of her broadest performances.

Lee was cast as a lead in only her fourth film, Hammer Pictures' Murder by Proxy (1954), with Dane Clark, shot in late 1953, and released in the US by Lippert Pictures. She had an eye-catching role in The Belles of St. Trinian's (1954), a hugely popular comedy from Frank Launder, at British Lion, where she seduced a jockey (Michael Ripper), in order to get information.

In December 1954, Lee was cast as the second female lead in a thriller Footsteps in the Fog (1955), supporting Stewart Granger and Jean Simmons, directed by Arthur Lubin for Columbia.

== The Rank Organisation ==
In 1955 Lee signed a contract with The Rank Organisation – she was under 21 so her husband had to sign it. Rank put her in a comedy Man of the Moment (1955), with Norman Wisdom, the biggest comedy star in British cinema at the time. She then made No Smoking (1955), for Tempean Films, with Reg Dixon.

=== Stardom ===
Rank cast Lee as a nurse in a medical drama The Feminine Touch (1956), produced through Ealing under the direction of Pat Jackson, shot in mid 1955. After a week at the Venice Film Festival she went straight in to a comedy, Who Done It? (1956), for Ealing, where she was the leading lady to Benny Hill. During the filming of this she said she would prefer to be in romantic parts like Footsteps in the Fog. These two films were among the last made at Ealing Studios.

Lee was a nurse again in a thriller with Donald Sinden, Eyewitness (1956), directed by Muriel Box for Rank. Lee replaced Diana Dors in The Big Money with Ian Carmichael, a film shot in April 1956 but which Sir John Davis of Rank disliked so much they delayed showing it for two years. Filmink argued she "seems bored" in the film.

By June 1956 she had made nine films, six of which were for Rank. She said being a film star was "really 90 percent luck and only 10 percent ability" and accredited her success to "being at the right place at the right time."

In June 1956, she played Rosalind in a production of As You Like It at an open-air theatre in Regent's Park. That same month, she said, "I want people to think of me as a serious actress and not just a glamour girl... It's rather hard to go from the films to Shakespeare on stage – it is easier the other way around. I left myself wide open for criticism." Reviews of her performance were mixed, though she received some positive notices.

The Spectator said she "combines eloquence of voice and gesture with a pleasantly un-leading-lady-like approach."

The Daily Telegraph wrote, "I don't suppose there has ever been a more high-speed Rosalind in the history of the play... her gaiety and vitality are spontaneous and charming. But all the time she was in her boy's disguise I kept thinking what a good Peter Pan she would make."

The Financial Times described her as "brown as a nut, fresh as a daisy and pretty as a buttercup," saying she "made a spirited alfresco Rosalind even if a little too much on the cute side."

During the play's run she said "my ambition is to make a great film. I am trying to break away from glamour parts. I love comedy but I don't want any more films with custard pies. And I don't want to stooge for comedians again." In October 1956, John Davis, managing director of Rank, announced her as one of the actors under contract that Davis thought would become an international star.

Lee was top billed in a crime drama The Secret Place (1957), directed by Clive Donner; she also had the female lead in Miracle in Soho (1957) with John Gregson, filmed in early 1957, and in the period drama Dangerous Exile (1957), opposite Louis Jourdan; during the filming of the latter she was injured when her hair caught fire. Miracle in Soho was a flop but British exhibitors voted her the 10th-most popular British film star at the box office in 1957 (ranked in front of her were Dirk Bogarde, Kenneth More, Peter Finch, John Gregson, Norman Wisdom, John Mills, Stanley Baker, Ian Carmichael and Jack Hawkins – Lee was the only woman on the list).

=== Italy ===
Towards the end of 1957 Lee went to Italy to play a model in the Ancient World in The Goddess of Love (1957). During the course of the shoot she had a highly publicised romance with a married noble, Prince Filippo Orsini (1920-1984), head of the Orsini family. This resulted in Lee leaving her husband Lucas in September. In October 1957, Lee told the press "I had a strict and very ladylike upbringing. When I went to Rome it was the first time I had been abroad on my own. It was marvellous. I even learned to swear."

Lee returned to Rank to make Nor the Moon by Night (1957), which was shot in London and on location in the Union of South Africa. During the shoot she told a reporter she liked to play "passionate exotic parts. I don't want to be the girl next door or somebody's sister. I don't really like being a simple outdoor girl either- good at heart, even when she's swept off her feet."

=== Suicide attempt ===
During filming, Lee went to Italy to visit Prince Orsini, her married lover. Italian newspapers reported that Lee had taken an overdose of sleeping pills. Three days later, Orsini, a Papal prince, was reported to have been hospitalised after slashing his wrists. Police refused to comment on the newspaper reports linking the two romantically. Prince Orsini, whose injuries were minor, refused to tell the police why he had done it. Lee said that she had been suffering from insomnia and had taken an overdose by mistake. Both were married to others at the time. The Vatican said that Orsini would lose his title if it were proven that he had attempted suicide, and the elderly Pope Pius XII removed Orsini and the Orsini family from their hereditary position of Prince Assistant to the Papal Throne. The Pope also made a speech condemning suicide, which was thought to be a reference to the Orsini–Lee scandal, although neither was named.

Lee was smuggled out of Rome to return to South Africa in February to complete Nor the Moon by Night. (Questions were asked in the Parliament of South Africa about whether Lee was given special treatment to enter the country, as a customs and immigration officer met her on the plane at Johannesburg airport so she could avoid the press. She transferred to a plane to Durban, stayed in the crew cabin and was allowed to disembark later.) "I regret any harm I have done to anyone in Italy", she said.

In July 1958, she was announced for Love is My Business with Raymond Pelligin, directed by Ralph Habib. It was never made but while still under contract to Rank, Lee went to France to play the female lead in This Desired Body (1959), a romantic melodrama. The Monthly Film Bulletin later said "Lee gives an uninhibited but sympathetic performance in a part she was to make her own, the prostitute reformed." Also in France she did Les Dragueurs (1959) starring Charles Aznavour, later released in the US as The Chasers.

In October 1958, Rank announced they would not pick up its option on Lee's contract at the end of the year, the same day they announced they would not pick up the contracts for Patrick McGoohan. (A fortnight earlier, they made a similar announcement for Ronald Lewis.) "We cannot be certain of parts in the immediate future for these two artists", said a Rank spokesperson. "But that does not mean that they would not be very welcome if any suitable parts did arise. Miss Lee has often said she would rather not work in this country." The spokesman added "the dropping of Miss Lee's contract has no connection with events earlier in the year." Lee, then in France making a movie, said "I had an idea that something of the sort was likely...Naturally, I am not pleased but neither am I too disturbed." Rank had cut its contract list to 23, when it had been 100 a few years previously. "This will give me more time to make pictures in Italy and France", she added. She relocated to the Continent and Rank subsequently put its efforts into promoting Anne Heywood. The month before, John Davis of Rank had said "Young artists today won't work. They are given a big build-up by the press and it goes to their heads. We get others who say 'We don't want to leave Britain for a year'. They lose all sense of proportion."

In December 1958 it was reported that Lee and Prince Orsini had moved in together in Paris.

== European star ==
Lee's first film post-Rank was The Nights of Lucretia Borgia (1959), shot in Italy, playing the title role. In early 1959 she made The Magliari (1959), an Italian film shot in Germany directed by Francesco Rosi. She stayed in Germany to make a local movie, Love Now, Pay Later (1959), playing Rosemarie Nitribitt, a prostitute who was murdered.

In June 1959 she said "Now all the time I make films One after the other. It won't last but now I am in demand. I might as well cash in on it. For the first time I make money. Always am I asked now to play wicked women... On the Continent I'm thought of always in connection with parts like that. Bit of a change from the old Rank Orgy. But I'm not ambitions anymore. I don't care any more to be a big star. I used to be so ambitious – now it means nothing to me. Now I just wanted to make some money. So I can live the way I want to."

In August 1959 Lee was in Marie of the Isles (1959), a French-Italian adventure tale where she played the real life Marie Bonnard du Parquet. This was followed by Vacations in Majorca (1959), an Italian comedy and Messalina (1960), an Italian Ancient history epic where Lee played the title role, shot in late 1959. In December she was in Munich to film Satan Tempts with Love (1960) when she announced her relationship with Orsini was over. Orsini later wrote that when Lee went to Germany to make a movie "she felt would be important to her career" he refused to go, which ended their relationship.

Lee went back to Italy to make Long Night in 1943 (1960), a critically acclaimed war drama, and had a cameo in Love, the Italian Way (1960), a comedy with Walter Chiari, shot in mid 1960. In May 1960, she said "all they wanted when I was filming in England were dewey-eyed little innocents and sexy big-bosomed blondes and I didn't think I fitted either bill."

She appeared opposite Cornel Wilde in Constantine and the Cross (1961), playing Fausta, and had leading roles in Blood Feud (1961) and Ghosts of Rome (1961), the latter with Marcello Mastroianni.

Lee's last film was the Biblical epic The Story of Joseph and His Brethren (1961). An article after her death said Lee made £150,000 from her European films.

In December 1960, Lee announced her engagement to filmmaker Gualtiero Jacopetti. Shortly afterwards, he was charged with molesting three girls under eleven years of age in Hong Kong. He had also once been married to a thirteen-year-old who had accused him of rape, and was waiting for his divorce from her. She took several months off to accompany Jacopetti around the world to shoot footage for a documentary. "When she loved a man she loved him completely", said one friend.

== Death ==
On 12 March 1961, Belinda Lee died in a car crash in San Bernardino County, California, on her way to Los Angeles from Las Vegas, on Highway 91, nine miles east of Baker, California. She was a passenger in a car going 100 miles per hour (160 km/h) when a tyre blew, causing the car to skid. Lee was thrown from the car and found lying 63 feet (19 m) away and was pronounced dead at Barstow Community Hospital. Gualtiero Jacopetti and two other Italian men with her in the car were injured.

Her ashes are interred in the Non-Catholic Cemetery (Cimitero acattolico) in Rome, Italy.

After her death at age 25, the Monthly Film Bulletin called her "an actress who will now always be remembered with affection as a star in the Crawford and Mercouri class."

She left the bulk of her estate – thought to be £20,000 – to the Rome Centre of Experimental Cinematography to be used for establishing scholarships for promising students of the Motion Film Academy of Rome.

== Legacy ==
The 1963 semi-documentary Italian film The Women of the World was dedicated to Lee with a written announcement at the start of the film (which interrupts the title music): "To Belinda Lee, who throughout this long journey accompanied and helped us with love."

The Daily Telegraph wrote an obituary which said "She was considered at one time to be a potential star of international status. Although she continued to play leading roles she did not fulfil her earlier promise. Her career was hampered by a stormy private life which led to unfavourable publicity."

The Daily Mail, reviewing Joseph in 1964, said "we come away sadly reflecting that properly handled, which she so rarely was, Belinda Lee might have been groomed into some kind of English Loren."

== Selected filmography ==
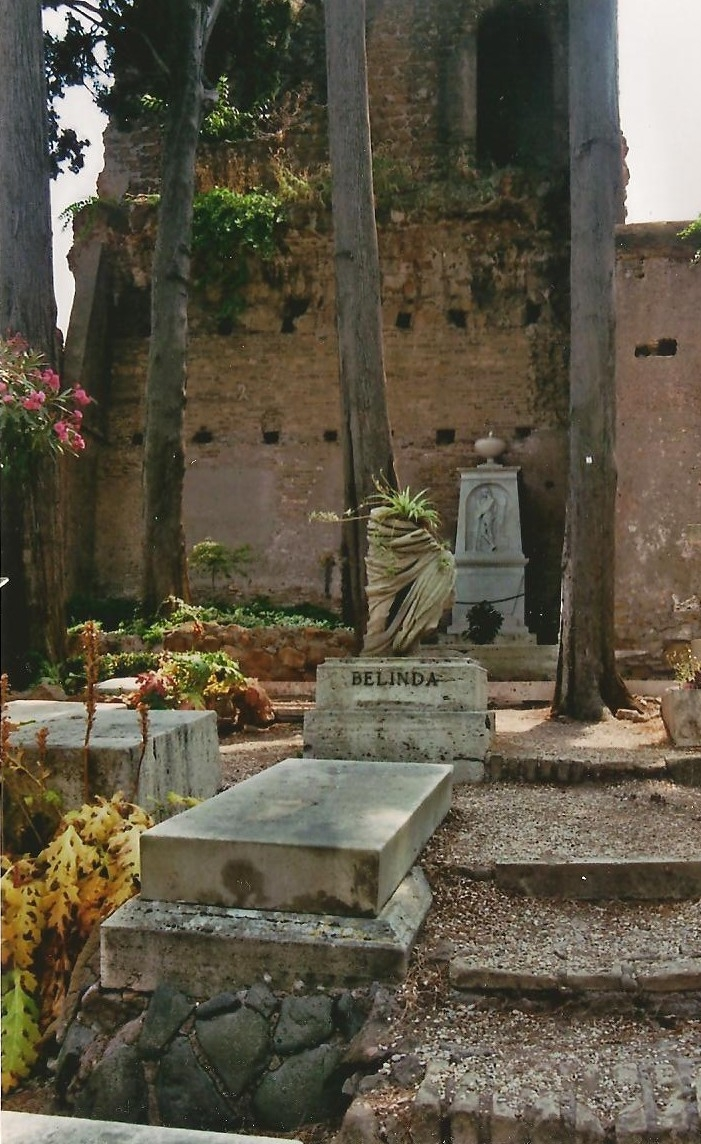
Grave of Belinda Lee at the Cimitero acattolico in Rome

- The Runaway Bus (1954) – comedy with Frankie Howerd, directed by Val Guest
- Murder by Proxy (1954) aka Blackout – thriller with Dane Clark, directed by Terence Fisher
- Life with the Lyons (1954) aka Family Affair, directed by Val Guest
- Meet Mr. Callaghan (1954)
- The Belles of St. Trinian's (1954) – comedy directed by Frank Launder
- 'The Case of Canary Jones (1954)
- Footsteps in the Fog (1955) – thriller directed by Arthur Lubin
- Man of the Moment (1955) – comedy with Norman Wisdom
- No Smoking (1955) – comedy with Reg Dixon
- Who Done It? (1956) – comedy with Benny Hill
- The Feminine Touch (1956) aka The Gentle Touch – drama with George Baker
- Eyewitness (1956) – thriller with Donald Sinden
- The Big Money (made 1956, released 1958) – comedy with Ian Carmichael
- The Secret Place (1957) – thriller with Ronald Lewis
- Miracle in Soho (1957) – romantic drama with John Gregson
- The Goddess of Love (1957) – shot in Italy
- Dangerous Exile (1957) – costume drama with Louis Jourdan
- Nor the Moon by Night (1958) aka Elephant Gun – romance adventure directed by Ken Annakin
- This Desired Body (1959) aka Ce corps tant désiré aka Way of the Wicked – French film with Maurice Ronet
- Les Dragueurs (1959) aka The Chasers – French film
- The Nights of Lucretia Borgia (1959) aka Le notti di Lucrezia Borgia – Italian film
- The Magliari (1959) aka The Swindlers – Italian film
- Love Now, Pay Later (1959) aka She Walks by Night, Die Wahrheit über Rosemarie – German film
- Marie of the Isles (1959)
- Brevi amori a Palma di Majorca (1959) – Italian film with Alberto Sordi
- Messalina (1960) -costume drama
- Satan Tempts with Love (1960) aka Der Satan lockt mit Liebe – German film
- Long Night in 1943 (1960) aka It Happened in '43, La lunga notte del '43
- Love, the Italian Way (1960) aka Femmine di lusso
- Constantine and the Cross (1961) aka Costantino il grande – with Cornel Wilde
- Blood Feud (1961) aka Il sicario
- Phantom Lovers (1961) aka Fantasmi a Roma aka Ghosts of Rome
- The Story of Joseph and His Brethren (1961) aka Giuseppe venduto dai fratelli

=== Select theatre credits ===
- Point of Departure (March 1952) Nottingham Playhouse
- Dpahne Laureola
- The Love of Four Colonels (1953) Nottingham Playhouse
- As You Like It (June 1956)
