= Germano Longo =

Italian actor and voice actor (1933–2022)

- Born: 24 May 1933; Poggiardo, Kingdom of Italy
- Died: 14 July 2022 (aged 89); Rome, Italy
- Occupation: Actor

Germano Longo (24 May 1933 – 14 July 2022) was an Italian actor and voice actor. He was sometimes credited as Herman Lang or Grant Laramy.

== Life and career ==
Born in Poggiardo, Longo attended the Centro Sperimentale di Cinematografia in Rome, graduating in 1953. He was very active in genre films, particularly peplum, adventure and Spaghetti Western films. He was also active as a dubber and as a dubbing director, mainly active in the anime genre.

== Filmography ==
Year	Title	Role	Notes
1954	Folgore Division	Paratrooper	
1955	La grande savana	Enrico	
1956	Roland the Mighty	Gualtiero	
1957	El Alamein	Parachutist	Uncredited
1957	The Dragon's Blood	Gerenot	
1958	La zia d'America va a sciare	Lucio	
1958	Slave Women of Corinth	Osco	
1958	The Pirate of the Black Hawk	Marco	
1959	The Nights of Lucretia Borgia	Ufficiale	
1959	I mafiosi	Carlo Spano	
1959	Juke box - Urli d'amore		
1961	Guns of the Black Witch	Michel	
1961	Atlas in the Land of the Cyclops	Re Agisandro	
1961	Sword in the Shadows	Braccio	
1961	The Secret of the Black Falcon	Zampa di Gatto / Katzenpfote	
1961	Queen of the Seas	Pirate Ivan	
1961	Duel of the Titans	Scebro	
1961	The Corsican Brothers	Claudio Franchi	
1961	Desert Furlough	Un Militare	
1962	Colossus of the Arena	Ligonius	
1962	The Triumph of Robin Hood	Alan Clare	
1963	I am Semiramis	Omnos	
1964	Seven Slaves Against the World	Lucius Emilius	
1964	La vendetta di Spartacus	Marcellus	
1965	La Colt è la mia legge	Mark, O'Brien's Right-hand Man	
1965	Adiós gringo	Stan Clevenger	
1966	The Murder Clinic	Ivan	
1966	Five for Revenge	Jim Latimore	
1967	I criminali della metropoli	Henry Delange	
1968	Vendo cara la pelle	Father Dominique Magdalena	
1968	The Girl Who Couldn't Say No	Giuseppe Belli	
1969	The Fourth Wall	Nani	
1969	Twenty Thousand Dollars for Seven	Bill Cochran	
1970	Sunflower	Ettore	
1970	The Howl	Direttore manicomio	
1971	The Policeman		
1974	Claretta and Ben	Burino	
1974	Amore amaro	Francesco Galli	
1976	A Sold Life	Major Limentani	
1981	E noi non faremo Karakiri	Giggi	
2012	Tutto tutto niente niente	Presidente della Camera	
