= The Secret Place (film) =

1957 British film by Clive Donner

- Directed by: Clive Donner
- Written by: Linette Perry
- Produced by: John Bryan associate Anthony Perry
- Starring: Belinda Lee; Ronald Lewis; Michael Brooke
- Cinematography: Ernest Steward
- Edited by: Peter Bezencenet
- Music by: Clifton Parker
- Production company: John Bryan Productions
- Distributed by: Rank
- Release date: 27 May 1957
- Running time: 98 minutes
- Country: United Kingdom
- Language: English

The Secret Place is a 1957 British crime film directed by Clive Donner and starring Belinda Lee and Ronald Lewis. It was written by Linette Perry.

== Plot ==
In a badly bombed district in the East End of London after the Second World War, a gang carries out a diamond robbery.

An adolescent boy, Freddie Haywood, has a crush on a kiosk attendant, Molly Wilson, who is engaged to Gerry Carter, a member of the gang. After the robbery, from a jeweller's in Hatton Garden, Gerry hides the diamonds inside Molly's record player. Freddie discovers the diamonds and the gang goes after him.

== Cast ==
- Belinda Lee as Molly Wilson
- Ronald Lewis as Gerry Carter
- Michael Brooke as Freddie Haywood
- Michael Gwynn as Steve Warring
- Geoffrey Keen as Mr Haywood
- David McCallum as Mike Wilson
- Maureen Pryor as Mrs Haywood
- George Selway as Paddy
- George A. Cooper as Harry

== Production ==
Clive Donner had been an editor on Genevieve (1953), I am a Camera (1955) and other films. This was his first film as director. It was one of several thrillers made by the Rank Organisation around this time.

Filming took place at Pinewood Studios, starting in June 1956 and on location at Bethnal Green.

Anthony Steel was meant to play the male lead but he broke his contract with Rank and was replaced by Ronald Lewis, who had just signed a contract with the studio. The film also gave David McCallum his breakthrough role.

Clive Donner said it was "quite clear" the Rank Organisation wanted him to cast Belinda Lee. He went to see her play Rosalind in As You Like It on stage but felt she was not "convincingly working class" which the role required. He wanted to cast Barbara Archer and screen tested her, but John Davis did not want to cast her as "he was determined to have Belinda". So Donner cast Lee and said she worked very hard. Donner says Davis also disliked the locations feeling they were too ugly; however the director was supported by Rank executive James Archibald. Donner tried to cast lesser known faces and got many from theatre workshops. "They were absolutely right, absolutely natural," he said.

== Reception ==
=== Box office ===
Donner said the film "did alright" when it came out although its release coincided with the Suez Crisis.

=== Critical ===
Variety said "the East End setting among London's bombed sites provides an intriguing background for this crime meller. But the story unspools too casually, dissipating too much of the potential tension. As it stands, it's a modest b.o. bet. moderately entertaining."

Lindsay Anderson, writing in the New Statesman, called the opening sequence "the most exciting sequence seen on a (wide) screen in this country in the last five years" and said the film was "a remarkably assured and craftsmanlike start" for Donner's career.

The Monthly Film Bulletin said the film "gains strongly over the average British crime thriller in its concern to establish a realistic background and setting. The East End locations are well chosen and freshly observed; the characters (apart from the two criminals, who seem rather unduly public school) quite convincingly inhabit this world of grey back streets and derelict bomb-sites. The balance between action sequences (the neatly-staged robbery and the final chase) and character study is well sustained, and Belinda Lee gives her best performance to date."

The British Film Institute praised the "remarkable debut screenplay by Linette Perry, which manages to intertwine the generic conventions of the heist thriller with a simple, but poetic, moral drama. In Perry's world the secret places stretch beyond the physical – the record player, gang hideouts and derelict buildings – into the hearts of the young protagonists. Faced with opportunity and misguided by love, the characters are all confronted with their own buried selfishness."

Filmink called it a "minor classic" and said it was the one film in Belinda Lee's career that comes close to cult status.

In British Sound Films: The Studio Years 1928–1959 David Quinlan rated the film as "very good", writing: "Convincingly set drama with tingling climax."
