= Swordsman of Siena =

- Directed by: Étienne Périer; Baccio Bandini
- Written by: Alec Coppel; Fay Kanin; Michael Kanin
- Based on: story by Anthony Marshall
- Produced by: Jacques Bar
- Starring: Stewart Granger
- Cinematography: Tonino Delli Colli
- Edited by: Robert Isnardon; Monique Isnardon
- Music by: Mario Nascimbene
- Production companies: CCM/Monica Film; CPRA/Jacques Bar
- Distributed by: Metro-Goldwyn-Mayer
- Release date: 1962
- Running time: 92 minutes
- Countries: Italy; France
- Language: English
- Budget: $1.065 million
- Box office: $2.25 million

Swordsman of Siena (Italian: La congiura dei dieci; French: Le Mercenaire) is a 1962 French-Italian adventure film directed by Étienne Périer and Baccio Bandini and starring Stewart Granger, Sylva Koscina and Christine Kaufmann. The film is set in Spanish-controlled Italy during the sixteenth century.

== Plot summary ==
Thomas Stanswood, a veteran English mercenary serving the nobles of Renaissance Italy, accepts employment in the city-state of Siena. This former republic has been occupied by the Spanish Empire, and Don Carlos, the cold-blooded Imperial governor, seeks to legitimize his power by marrying into the locally prestigious Arconti family. Stanswood must protect the bride-to-be, Lady Orietta Arconti, whose friendly relations with the Spanish have put her in danger of assassination by a mysterious resistance group known as "the Ten".

Orietta vehemently does not want a bodyguard, and she and Stanswood seek to annoy each other wherever possible. Her virtuous and patriotic younger sister Serenella feels differently, becoming smitten with Stanswood despite the difference in their ages and political affiliations.

On his first night of guard duty Stanswood catches an assassin, sent by the Ten, in the hall outside Orietta's bedroom. After a scuffle, the assassin flees with a wounded hand. Attending Don Carlos' court the next morning, the mercenary sees that Andrea Paresi, a Sienese nobleman, bears an identical wound on his hand.

Stanswood begins following Paresi and discovers both that he is the leader of the Ten and that he is preparing to enter Siena's annual horse race. Ever since the Spanish invasion this event has been won by Hugo, captain of the Imperial guards; victory by an Italian would cause a surge of local pride that the Ten could exploit to overthrow Don Carlos' government. Stanswood confronts Paresi and the two men fight a duel, which Stanswood wins. Secretly the mercenary is more in sympathy with the rebels than with his Spanish employers. He lets Paresi go unharmed and does not report the plot to Don Carlos. This act of clemency does not save the rebel leader, who is betrayed by a confederate and arrested by Hugo's men.

In conversation with Stanswood, Serenella learns that his native town in England is also oppressed by a tyrannical government, and that he plans someday to liberate it with the help of the money he has made in Italy. This unexpected commonality increases her fondness for him, and she begins pressing him to take her along when he goes home. Don Carlos learns of the rapport between the two and assumes that Stanswood is trying himself to marry into the Arconti family and take control of the city.

At a subsequent court party, Carlos announces that he intends Serenella to marry Hugo. Horrified, she runs out of the palace, forgetting that the Spanish have forbidden walking in the streets at night. Not recognizing Serenella, a guard shoots her for disobeying the curfew; Stanswood hastens to rescue her, but can do nothing but keep her company as she dies. Meanwhile Hugo inadvertently kills Paresi while trying to question him under torture.

Stanswood seeks out the hideout of the Ten, and is startled to find that Orietta is one of the conspirators; her betrothal to Don Carlos was a fraud. The mercenary offers to take the place of Paresi in the horse race, and the Ten consent just before Spanish guards storm the building. Stanswood and Orietta escape together, and during a night spent hiding they begin to fall in love.

On the morning of the race Stanswood appears among the competitors, riding Paresi's horse. The track loops through an obstacle course set up in the Sienese countryside, and at its conclusion Stanswood and Hugo are in the lead. The guards captain is unhorsed and killed by an angry mob, while Stanswood rides into the city and incites the Italians to rise up and capture Don Carlos.

Carlos agrees to evacuate his troops from the city, and Siena becomes a republic once more. Stanswood also tries to leave, intending to resume his mercenary career, but Orietta sends a party of armed men to bring him back. He is not sorry to return to her.

== Main cast ==
- Stewart Granger as Thomas Stanswood
- Sylva Koscina as Orietta Arconti
- Christine Kaufmann as Serenella Arconti
- Riccardo Garrone as Don Carlos
- Alberto Lupo as Andrea Paresi
- Marina Berti as Countess of Osta
- Tullio Carminati as Father Giacomo
- Claudio Gora as Leoni
- Carlo Rizzo as Gino
- Fausto Tozzi as Hugo
- Tom Felleghi as The Spanish Captain

== Production ==
=== Development ===
The film was first announced in May 1951 with Yvonne de Carlo attached as star. It was to be shot in Italy.

In February 1954 Robert Taylor was mentioned as a possible star for producer Nicky Nayfak. However the following month MGM announced that Stewart Granger would star following Green Fire and that Alec Coppel would come out from England to write the script

In October 1954 MGM said that Fay and Michael Kanin were working on the script, and the movie would be shot in Italy once Granger had finished Bhowani Junction. Jean Simmons was discussed as a possible co star. In November 1954 the studio said the film would be made under the direction of Andrew Marton, and that Granger's co star would be Gina Lollobrigida making her Hollywood debut. The movie could not be shot in America as Lollobrigida was under personal contract to Howard Hughes.

In January 1955 MGM said the lead roles would be played by Granger and Elizabeth Taylor with Roy Rowland to direct. Taylor's husband Michael Wilding would also be in the cast. By February Taylor was off the film. The movie ended up being postponed again.

=== Shooting ===
In January 1961 Stewart Granger announced he had signed a new three-picture contract with MGM. He would star in I Thank a Fool, and two films for producer Jacques Bar, the first of which was The Swordsman of Siena. Gina Lollobrigida was again being sought to play the female lead. Granger's role in I Thank a Fool wound up being played by Peter Finch, but he did appear in Siena which started filming in October 1961.

Filming took place in and around Rome, notably at Castello Orsini-Odescalchi. Granger sprained his back while filming a duel scene and was laid up for several days.

== Reception ==
=== Critical ===
The Los Angeles Times called it an "old fashioned swashbuckling adventure."

The film has meanwhile been recognised as "one of the best of its type" for Stewart Granger's accomplished fencing performances and the horse race.

=== Box office ===
According to MGM accounts, after the production budget and other associated costs were taken away, the film lost $100,000.

In France it recorded admissions of 977,460.

== Bibliography ==
- Hughes, Howard (2011). Cinema Italiano – The Complete Guide From Classics To Cult. London – New York: I.B.Tauris. ISBN 978-1-84885-608-0.
