= Long Night in 1943 =

La lunga notte del '43
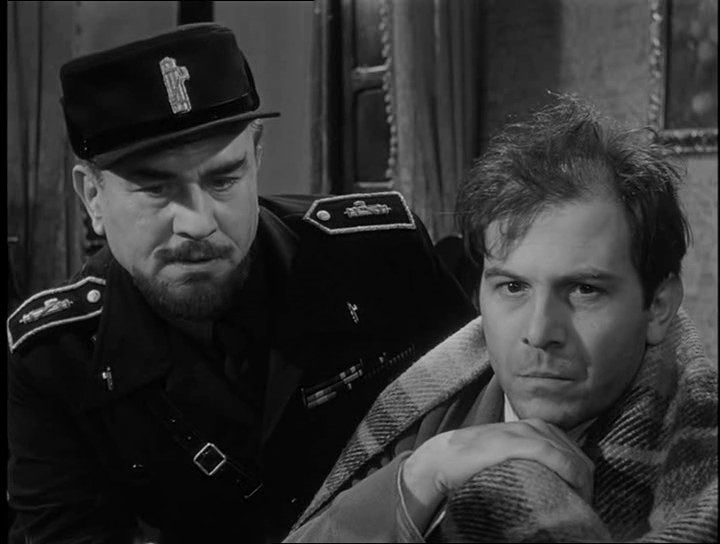
- Gino Cervi and Enrico Maria Salerno in a scene of the movie
- Directed by: Florestano Vancini
- Written by: Florestano Vancini; Ennio De Concini; Pier Paolo Pasolini
- Based on: novel by Giorgio Bassani
- Produced by: Tonino Cervi; Alessandro Jacovoni
- Starring: Belinda Lee; Gabriele Ferzetti; Enrico Maria Salerno; Andrea Checchi; Nerio Bernardi; Gino Cervi
- Cinematography: Carlo Di Palma
- Edited by: Nino Baragli
- Music by: Carlo Rustichelli
- Production companies: Ajace Produzioni Cinematografiche; Euro International Film (EIA)
- Distributed by: Euro International Film
- Release date: 1960
- Running time: 110 minutes
- Country: Italy
- Language: Italian

Long Night in '43 (Italian: La lunga notte del '43) is an Italian drama film of 1960 set in Ferrara, in the Italian Social Republic German puppet state during the late stages of the Second World War. It was directed by Florestano Vancini and adapted by Vancini, Ennio De Concini and Pier Paolo Pasolini from a short story by Giorgio Bassani. The film stars Enrico Maria Salerno, Gino Cervi, Belinda Lee, Gabriele Ferzetti and Andrea Checchi.

It was also known as The Long Night of '43 or It Happened in '43. The original Italian title was La lunga notte del '43.

In 2008, the film was included on the Italian Ministry of Cultural Heritage's 100 Italian films to be saved, a list of 100 films that "have changed the collective memory of the country between 1942 and 1978."

== Plot ==
In a town in the province of Ferrara in 1943, a pharmacist by the name of Pino is permanently crippled and unable to walk without crutches. He observes the town's activities from his upstairs window while his lonely wife Anna begins an affair with Franco, an old friend, and a deserter from the army.

Local Fascist leader Carlo Aretusi, better known as 'Sciagura' ('Calamity'), wants to assassinate his opponents in the Fascist party and blame it on some resistance supporters, including Franco's father.

On the night of 15 December, while Anna is out with Franco, Sciagura orders the suspected assassins to be shot in front of a wall of Estense Castle. Pino can see everything from his window but doesn't say a word.

Anna returns from Franco's home to find the bodies of the executed victims lying in the street where they fell and confronts Pino. Anna is then rejected by Franco and leaves town.

The townspeople follow the Fascists into the town square for a rally to celebrate the defeat of "traitors".

It is revealed that Pino's disability is due to syphilis, which he caught when Sciagura forced him into a brothel at gunpoint after participating in the March on Rome.

Years later, after the war, Franco returns to the town with his wife and son, and shows them a plaque located where his father was killed. He runs into Sciagura, who seems happy and content and has no regrets about what he did during the war. He says Franco looks like his father.

== Cast ==
- Enrico Maria Salerno as Pino Barilari
- Belinda Lee as Anna Barilari
- Gabriele Ferzetti as Franco Villani
- Gino Cervi as Carlo Aretusi aka "Sciagura"
- Andrea Checchi as Chemist
- Nerio Bernardi as Mr. Villani
- Isa Querio as Mrs. Villani
- Raffaella Pelloni as Ines Villani, Franco's sister
- Loris Bazzocchi as Vincenzi
- Carlo Di Maggio as Mario Bolognesi
- Alice Clements as Blanche Villani, Franco's wife
- Silla Bettini as Undocumented Man

== Production ==
The film was based on a 1955 novella by Giorgio Bassani, which was based on the real murder of eleven people in Ferrara on 15 November 1943 at Estense Castle who were killed by Fascists in response to the assassination of Fascist leader Igino Ghisellini.

The film was produced by Tonio Cervi who gave Bernardo Bertolucci his first chance to direct a film and was producer of the first films in colour by Michelangelo Antonioni, Federico Fellini and Francesco Rosi. Long Night in '43 was the directorial debut of documentary maker Florestano Vancini. It was one of a number of Italian movies made around this period to deal with World War Two. Filming took place in Italy in early 1960.

According to the Guardian, "Tonino's father played the role of a fascist bully, causing some controversy among those who identified him with the communist antagonist of Don Camillo."

The movie was a breakthrough credit for cinematographer Carlo di Palma.

== Reception ==
Variety called it "a well made straightforward vehicle which brings to life once more some of the more dramatic moments in recent Italian history... Major impact, however, is on the local ticket buyer, who is able to catch nuances and the import of dialog, scenes, and action. Export values appear to indicate specialized slotting only." It said the director had "a good feeling for period atmosphere" but said the film "keys a certain lack of drama which results in long stretches of tedium where crisper handling would have won a wider audience. For a production treating such heartfelt problems, the pic rarely grips nor is the illicit love affair moving or believable." "

According to an academic paper, "The ending of the film emphasises the erasure of Pino and Anna, the disabled and sexually transgressive witnesses who vanish from the screen and from the story without ever telling what they have seen. But it also shows the complicated interplay of memory and amnesia that allows the murder victims to be memorialised... [and] calls into question the shiny new 'normality' of boom-time Italy and suggests that it rests on a collective and willful failure to remember the past.}

Filmink said Lee was "excellent".

== Awards ==
At the 1960 Venice Film Festival, the film won Vancini the award for Best First Work and a nomination for the Golden Lion (losing out to Le Passage du Rhin).

Enrico Maria Salerno won a Silver Ribbon for Best Supporting Actor at the 1961 Italian National Syndicate of Film Journalists awards.
