= Alberto Lupo =

Italian film and television actor (1924–1984)

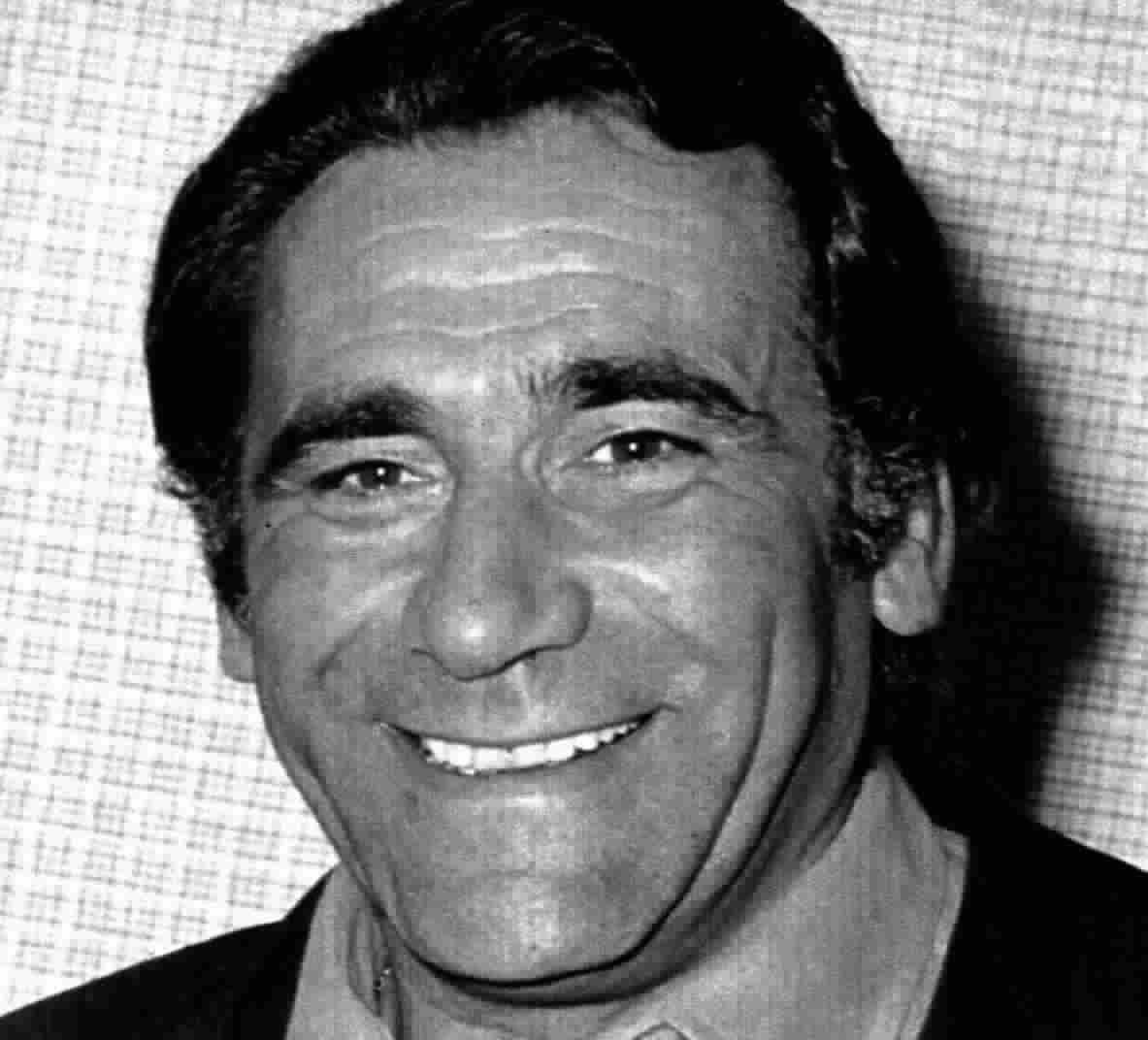
- Lupo in 1972
- Born: Alberto Zoboli; 19 December 1924; Genoa, Kingdom of Italy
- Died: 13 August 1984 (aged 59); San Felice Circeo, Italy
- Occupation: Actor
- Height: 1.75 m (5 ft 9 in)

Alberto Zoboli (19 December 1924 – 13 August 1984), known professionally as Alberto Lupo, was an Italian film and television actor best known for his roles in swashbuckling and action films of the 1960s.

Lupo starred in films such as A 008, operazione Sterminio in 1965 as Agent 006.

== Partial filmography ==
- Ulysses (1954) - One of Penelope's Suitors (uncredited)
- Uomini ombra (1954) - Narrator (uncredited)
- L'ultima violenza (1957) - Mauri
- The Adventures of Nicholas Nickleby (1958, TV series) - Walter Bray
- Herod the Great (1958) - Aronne / Aaron
- Wolves of the Deep (1959) - Radiotelegrafista
- The Giant of Marathon (1959) - Miltiades
- Atom Age Vampire (1960) - Prof. Alberto Levin
- Minotaur, the Wild Beast of Crete (1960) - Chirone
- The Bacchantes (1961) - Pentheus
- Blood Feud (1961)
- Revenge of the Conquered (1961)
- Ursus in the Valley of the Lions (1961) - Ayak
- Rocco e le sorelle (1961)
- La monaca di Monza (1962) - Giudice
- Lasciapassare per il morto (1962) - Maurizio
- Zorro alla corte di Spagna (1962) - Miguel
- Swordsman of Siena (1962) - Andrea Paresi
- Gli italiani e le donne (1962) - Alberto (segment "Chi la fa l'aspetti")
- Un alibi per morire (1962)
- Destination Rome (1963) - Paolino
- The Shortest Day (1963) - Ufficiale (uncredited)
- Rocambole (1963) - Baron Rudolf Keller
- Torpedo Bay (1963) - Magri
- The Bread Peddler (1963) - Étienne Castel
- Coriolanus: Hero without a Country (1964) - Sicinio
- La Cittadella (1964) - Dr. Andrew Manson
- The Lion of Thebes (1964) - Menelao
- Genoveffa di Brabante (1964) - Count Sigfrido di Treviri
- Il figlio di Cleopatra (1964) - Octavian
- 008: Operation Exterminate (1965) - Frank Smith, Agent 606
- The Agony and the Ecstasy (1965) - Duke of Urbino
- Night of Violence (1965) - Commisario Ferretti
- Spiaggia libera (1965) - L'ingegnere
- Django Shoots First (1966) - Doc
- Io ti amo (1968) - Prince Tancredi di Castelvolturno
- Action (1980) - Joe
