= Sylva Koscina =

Italian actress and model (1933–1994)

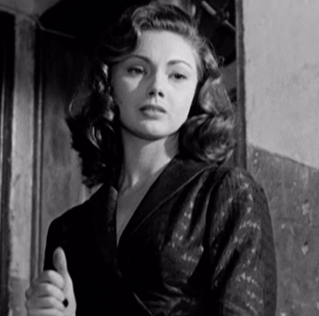
- Koscina in The Railroad Man (1956)
- Born: Silvija Košćina; 22 August 1933; Zagreb, Kingdom of Yugoslavia
- Died: 26 December 1994 (aged 61); Rome, Italy
- Occupations: Actress; model
- Years active: 1955–1994
- Spouse: Raimondo Castelli (m. 1967; div. 1971)

Sylva Koscina (Italian: [ˈsilva ˈkɔʃʃina]; born Silvija Košćina, Croatian: [sǐlvija kǒʃtɕina]; 22 August 1933 – 26 December 1994) was a Yugoslav-born Italian actress, best known for her role as Iole, the bride of Hercules (Steve Reeves) in Hercules (1958) and Hercules Unchained (1960). She also played Paul Newman's romantic interest in The Secret War of Harry Frigg (1968).

== Early life ==
She was born Silvija Košćina (Greek: Σύλβα Κοσκινού, romanized: Sýlva Koskinoú) in Zagreb, Sava Banovina, to a Greek father, owner of a hotel in the "West Coast" section of Split, and a Polish mother.

During World War II, in her preadolescence, Košćina was brought to Italy to live with her older sister, who had married an Italian citizen.

After winning beauty contests as a teenager, she was offered modeling work. In 1954, while studying physics at the University of Naples Federico II, and living in a boarding school of nuns, she was asked to be Miss di Tappa ("Stage Miss"), who presents flowers to the winner of a stage of the 1954 Giro d'Italia bicycle race, then at Naples. She was convinced, but with difficulty because of her shyness, then a picture of her, kissing the winner, was published in newspapers all over Europe.

== Career ==
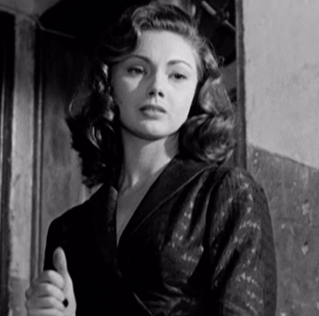
Koscina in The Railroad Man (1958)

Eduardo De Filippo noticed her and decided to cast her in a small role for the movie Questi fantasmi (1954) that was about to be filmed. This did not ultimately happen, but it did lead to a small part, of an aspiring actress, alongside Totò in Are We Men or Corporals? (1955) by Camillo Mastrocinque, leading to her breakout role, portraying Giulia, daughter of the train engineer Andrea, in Pietro Germi's The Railroad Man (1956). Koscina returned in Guendalina (1957), playing the part of a young mother.

A lead player in popular comedies, such as Oh! Sabella (1957), Ladro lui, ladra lei (He a thief, she a thief, 1958), and Poor Millionaires (1958), Koscina alternated cleverly between roles as vamp and ingenue. She represented women in search of social upward mobility, the image of an Italy that had left its worst problems behind.

Koscina was suited to sophisticated comedies like Mogli pericolose (Dangerous wives, 1958), where she made a direct sentimental challenge to poor Giorgia Moll. She played Hercules' fiancée in Le fatiche di Ercole (Hercules, 1958), a prototype of this kind of film. In Italy, a police officer let her go without issuing a traffic ticket. Later, as a guest on a television program, she thanked the policeman, thus getting him into trouble with the police department. The incident and its aftermath inspired the movie Il vigile (The Traffic Policeman, 1960), in which she played herself.

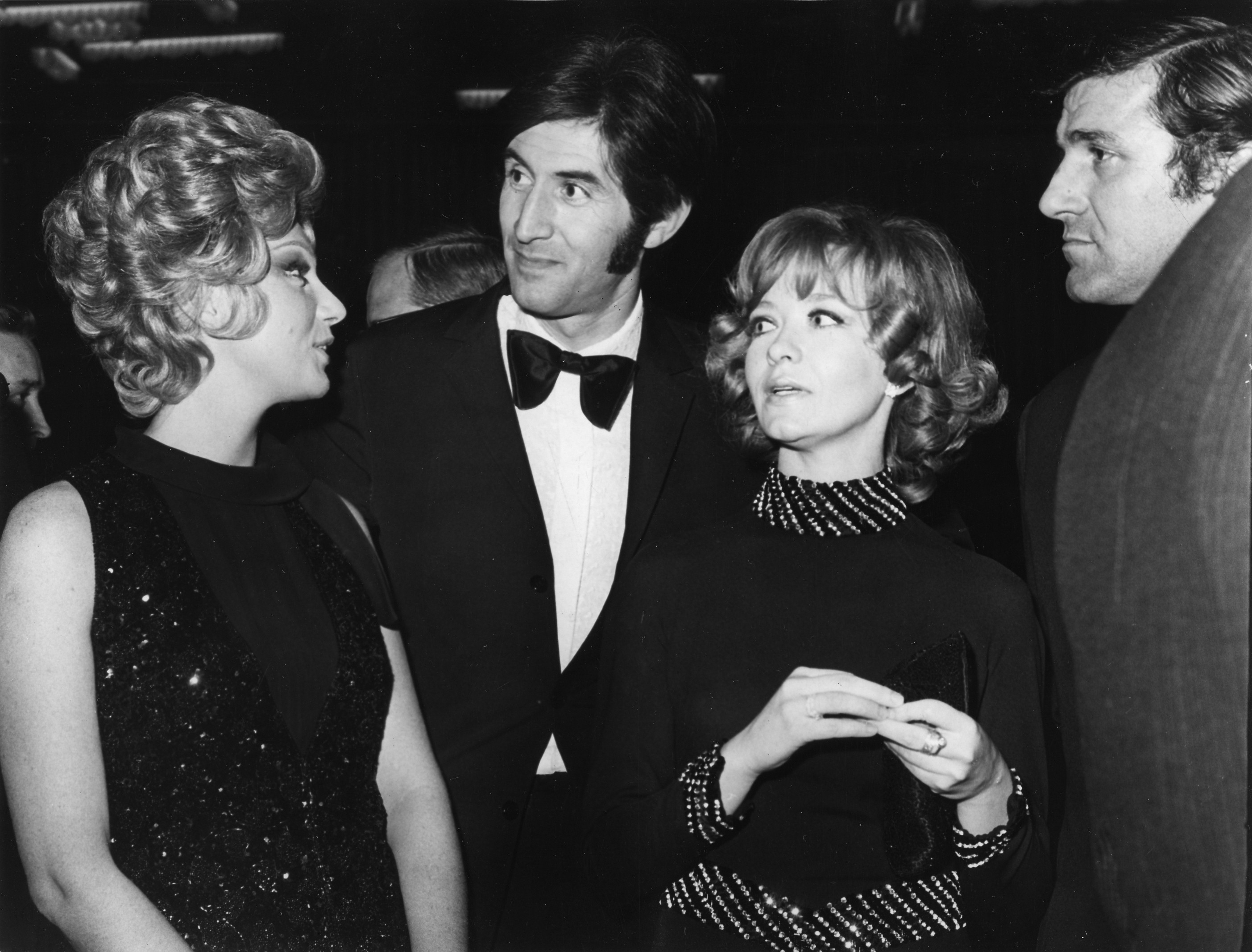
Koscina (left) with fellow Yugoslav actors Ljubiša Samardžić, Milena Dravić, and Bata Živojinović at the Battle of Neretva premiere in Sarajevo in November 1969

In the first half of the 1960s, she married her lover, Raimondo Castelli, a small producer connected with Minerva Films. She managed to keep well afloat with roles in Damiano Damiani's Il sicario (The Hired Killer, 1961). In La lepre e la tartaruga (The Tortoise and the Hare), an episode in Three Fables of Love (1963), the director Blasetti constructed a duel between Koscina and Monica Vitti. In 1965, Koscina appeared in Juliet of the Spirits. She was also a television personality and often made special guest appearances on variety shows. She also co-starred in Jesús Franco's Marquis de Sade: Justine (1969), as well as Mario Bava's 1972 film Lisa and the Devil.

From the early 1960s, she invested most of her considerable earnings in a luxurious villa, in the well-to-do district of Marino, Rome, complete with 16th-century furniture and artistic paintings. That lasted until her spending overcame her dwindling income, and she had to face a tax evasion inquest, when she was forced to sell her house in 1976. Living with Raimondo Castelli since 1960, they did not marry due to then Italian law and because his wife Marinella refused to give him an annulment. Castelli and Koscina married in Mexico in 1967, but that marriage was not recognized in Italy.

Angelo Frontoni (1929–2002) photographed Koscina for the American edition of Playboy in May 1967.

After turning 30, she partnered with actors such as Kirk Douglas in A Lovely Way to Die (1968) and Paul Newman in The Secret War of Harry Frigg (1967), but without any luck. Her career was given a boost in the second half of the 1960s when she was photographed bare-breasted in the Italian edition of Playboy magazine. Mauro Bolognini's L'assoluto naturale (1969) was released, complete with a "chaste" full nude shot.

She also starred in the 1967 comedy caper Three Bites of the Apple with David McCallum, and Deadlier Than the Male (1967), in which Elke Sommer and she portrayed sophisticated professional killers dueling with Bulldog Drummond. She also played female partisan soldier Danica in the Yugoslavian movie Battle of Neretva, in 1969. She played a German doctor, Bianca, in Hornets' Nest with Rock Hudson.

In the late 1960s and early 1970s, Koscina was a frequent visitor to Rome's Piper Club. The Piper Club opened in 1965 during the "dolce vita" era and was a destination of choice for the international jet set interested in what was new in art, culture and music. It is there that she met and befriended the elderly Archbishop Pietro Sfair.

== Personal life and habits ==
Koscina was known for her habit of referring to herself in the third person.

== Personal quotes ==
- On her notorious love scene in L'assoluto naturale (1969) – "Of course, if it had not been for the director, I wouldn't have done this film."
- On her friendship with the elderly Archbishop Pietro Sfair -- "he's my grand-daddy" ("nonno")

== Death ==
Koscina died in Rome in 1994, aged 61, from breast cancer.

== Selected filmography ==
- Are We Men or Corporals? (1955) - L'aspirante attrice
- The Railroad Man (1956) - Giulia Marcocci
- Michel Strogoff (1956) - Sangarre
- Engaged to Death (1957) - Lucia
- Guendalina (1957) - Francesca Redaelli, madre di Guendalina
- Oh! Sabella (1957) - Lucia
- Femmine tre volte (1957) - Sonia
- The Innocent with Forty Children (1957) - Gina Lantois
- The Mighty Crusaders (1957) - Clorinda
- Hercules (1958) - Iole, Daughter of Pelias
- Young Husbands (1958) - Mara Rossi Bandelli
- Ladro lui, ladra lei (1958) - Cesira De Angelis
- Quando gli angeli piangono (1958) - Marta
- Toto in Paris (1958) - Juliette Marchand
- Mogli pericolose (1958) - Tosca
- Toto in the Moon (1958) - Lidia
- Girls for the Summer (1958) - Renata Morandi
- Non sono più Guaglione (1958) - Carolina
- Hercules Unchained (1959) - Iole
- Poor Millionaires (1959) - Alice
- Le confident de ces dames (1959) - La docteur Maria Bonifati
- La nipote Sabella (1959) - Lucia
- Uncle Was a Vampire (1959) - Carla
- La cambiale (1959) - Odette Mercury
- Le sorprese dell'amore (1959) - Marianna
- Il vedovo (1959) - Herself (uncredited)
- Genitori in blue-jeans (1960) - Elena
- Siege of Syracuse (1960) - Clio
- I piaceri dello scapolo (1960) - Eby
- Trapped by Fear (1960) - Arabelle
- Le pillole di Ercole (1960) - Silvia Pasqui
- Mariti in pericolo (1960) - Silvana
- Ravishing (1960) - Evelyne Cotteret
- Femmine di lusso (1960) - Luciana
- The Traffic Policeman (1960) - Herself
- Blood Feud (1961) - Carla
- Mani in alto (1961)
- Jessica (1962) - Nunzia Tuffi
- Le massaggiatrici (1962) - Marisa
- Swordsman of Siena (1962) - Orietta Arconti
- Le Masque de fer (1962) - Marion
- Copacabana Palace (1962) - Ines
- Three Fables of Love (1962) - Mia (segment "Le lièvre et le tortue")
- La salamandre d'or (1962) - (uncredited)
- The Shortest Day (1963)
- Il Fornaretto di Venezia (1963) - Clemenza, Barbo's Wife
- Le monachine (1963) - Elena
- Rampage (1963) - Stewardess
- Judex (1963) - Daisy
- Girl's Apartment (1963) - Eléna
- Hot Enough for June (1964) - Vlasta Simoneva
- Love in Four Dimensions (1964) - Irma, la moglie (segment "Amore e vita")
- Let's Talk About Women (1964) - Reluctant Girl
- Corpse for the Lady (1964) - Laura Guglielmetti
- Cyrano and d'Artagnan (1964) - Ninon de l'Enclos
- Love and Marriage (1964) - (segment "Sabato 18 luglio")
- Le grain de sable (1964) - Alexandra Fonseca
- Una storia di notte (1964) - Maddalena
- The Dictator's Guns (1965) - Rae Osborne
- The Double Bed (1965) - Giulietta / Peggy
- That Man in Istanbul (1965) - Kelly
- The Dreamer (1965) - Irene
- Juliet of the Spirits (1965) - Sylva
- Thrilling (1965) - Paola (segment "L'autostrada del sole")
- I soldi (1965) - Leda
- Made in Italy (1965) - Diana (segment "3 'La Donna', episode 3")
- Agent X-77 Orders to Kill (1966) - Mania
- Me, Me, Me... and the Others (1966) - The 'Star'
- Monnaie de singe (1966) - Lucile
- Four Queens for an Ace (1966) - Dolorès Arrabal, Fashion Designer
- Three Bites of the Apple (1967) - Carla Moretti
- Deadlier Than the Male (1967) - Penelope
- Johnny Banco (1967) - Laureen Moore
- The Secret War of Harry Frigg (1968) - Countess Francesca Di Montefiore
- A Lovely Way to Die (1968) - Rena Westabrook
- The Protagonists (1968) - Nancy
- The Last Roman (1968–1969, part 1, 2) - Empress Theodora
- Marquis de Sade: Justine (1969) - La marquise de Bressac
- I See Naked (1969) - Herself
- L'assoluto naturale (1969) - She
- Battle of Neretva (1969) - Danica
- La colomba non deve volare (1970) - Anna Duplessis
- Vertige pour un tueur (1970) - Sylvie Dussart
- La modification (1970) - Cécile
- Hornets' Nest (1970) - Dr. Bianca
- Ninì Tirabusciò, la donna che inventò la mossa (1970) - Baroness di Valdarno
- Il sesso del diavolo (1971) - Sylvia, the Assistant
- Mazzabubù... quante corna stanno quaggiù? (1971) - La moglie del presentatore
- The Great Swindle (1971) - Lola
- Les jambes en l'air (1971) - Favouille Grandblaise
- Man of the Year (1971) - Carla
- African Story (1971) - Barbara Hayland
- No desearás la mujer del vecino (1971) - Susana
- Perché non ci lasciate in pace? (1971)
- Boccaccio (1972) - Fiametta
- So Sweet, So Dead (1972) - Barbara Capuana
- Sette scialli di seta gialla (1972) - Françoise Ballais
- Beati i ricchi (1972) - Contessa Tanzini
- The Italian Connection (1972) - Lucia Canali
- Uccidere in silenzio (1972) - Madre di Valeria
- My Pleasure Is Your Pleasure (1973) - La moglie del tintore
- Lisa and the Devil (1973) - Sophia Lehar
- Un par de zapatos del '32 (1974) - Sonya Dorigny
- Las correrías del Vizconde Arnau (1974) - Zoraida
- Delitto d'autore (1974) - Milena Gottardi
- Dracula in the Provinces (1975) - Mariù - wife of Costante
- Clara and Nora (1975)
- Casanova & Co. (1977) - The Prefect's Wife
- Sunday Lovers (1980) - Zaira (segment "Armando's Notebook")
- Asso (1981) - Enrichetta Morgan
- Questo e Quello (1983) - Dora (segment "Quello... col basco rosso")
- Mani di fata (1983) - Contessa Irene
- Cenerentola '80 (1984) - Princess Gherardeschi
- Die Nacht der vier Monde (1984)
- Rimini Rimini (1987) - Countess Rita-Engineer Pedercini's Sister
- Ricky & Barabba (1992) - Cristina Bonelli
- Kim Novak Is on the Phone (1994) - Enrico's Mother (final film role)

== Theatre ==
- La commedia del Decamerone ("The Decameron comedy") by Mario Amendola and Bruno Corbucci with Sylva Koscina, Marisa Solinas, Vittorio Congia, Anna Campori. Directed by Amendola & Corbucci (1972).
