= Love Now, Pay Later =

- Directed by: Rudolf Jugert
- Produced by: Dieter Fritko
- Starring: Belinda Lee
- Edited by: Dieter-Frisko-Produktion; Rapid Film
- Distributed by: Union Film (Germany)
- Release dates: 23 October 1959 (Germany); August 1960 (USA)
- Running time: 101 mins
- Country: West Germany
- Languages: German; English

Love Now, Pay Later (German: Die Wahrheit über Rosemarie) is a 1959 West German drama film directed by Rudolf Jugert and starring Belinda Lee, Walter Rilla and Karl Schönböck. It was inspired by the life and death of Rosemarie Nitribitt.

It was also known in the US as She Walks By Night.

== Premise ==
A prostitute is found murdered. Police seek to find her killer.

Rosemarie was a prostitute who sought out wealthy clients. She used them to maintain her lifestyle. An elderly Russian, Waltikoff, falls in love with her and proposes, but breaks it off when he realises she will not give up prostitution. She is attracted to a younger man, Guttberg, but he rebuffs her.

Rosemarie gradually goes for lower class customers. One night alone in her flat she is attacked and killed by one of her associates. But his identity remains unknown.

== Partial cast ==
- Belinda Lee – Rosemarie Nitbritt
- Walter Rilla – Woltikoff
- Karl Schönböck – Von Riedendank
- Claus Wilcke – Fred Guttberg
- Jan Hendriks – Salzmann
- Paul Dahlke – Reimer
- Hans Nielsen – Bernbeil
- Karl Lieffen – Zuhälter
- Lina Carstens – Frau Huber
- Ernst Schiffner

== Production ==
It was the second film version of this story, following Rosemary (1958) which had been one of the most successful German films at the box office that year. Variety said it "stirred up the best cinema biz of any German film in this country, coining plenty for its distributor." The movie had led to a number of imitators, including The Truth About Rosemarie.

Producer Dieter Fritko announced he was making a film called The Truth About Rosemarie which would star Heinz Pohlmann, the Frankfurt salesman who spent a year in jail on suspicion of Rosemarie's murder. This prompted much controversy. According to Variety, SPIO, the leading German film industry organization, was criticized in the trades for not taking a definite stand against the film "on the grounds of questionable taste". The first distributor that was announced for the film withdrew due to the controversy. A new distributor was found, Emil Reinegger, of Union Film. SPIO eventually suggested that none of its members in the technical, export, distribution or theatre-operating branches have anything to do with the film. Reinegger complained that no one from SPIO had discussed the story with him and said that Pohlmann would only work on the film and not appear in it.

The script was reportedly based on the 19 volume police record.

Production took place in Munich. Rosemarie was one of a series of sexually aggressive characters played by Belinda Lee in European films.

== Censorship ==
When Love Now, Pay Later was first released in Italy in 1959 with the title L'Inferno addosso, the Committee for the Theatrical Review of the Italian Ministry of Cultural Heritage and Activities rated it as VM16: not suitable for children under 16. In order for the film to be screened publicly, the Committee imposed the removal of the following lines and scenes:

1. "I am going to take a bath, for your curiosity I won't lock the door";
2. "You have always sold yourself for money – would you like to be there?" (when she seems to start undressing);
3. "You know, underwear does not turn me on. Look! It's black";
4. Delete dialogue and sequence of Rosemarie receiving payment for her trade;
5. Delete the scene in which Riccardo, the pimp, defends Rosemarie from a visitor in the entryway;
6. The scene in which, at Riccardo's place, Rosemarie pulls up her skirt to show the underwear;
7. The scene in which Rosemarie tries on the fur coat the vendor brought to her and in taking it off shows her naked back.

The official document number is: 30830, it was signed on 31 December 1959 by Minister Domenico Magrì.

The film was initially rejected by the Freiwillige Selbstkontrolle (Voluntary Self Control) in Germany.

== Reception ==
The Monthly Film Bulletin called it "flat and tedious... the film combines a fearsome insistence on the wages of sin with a titillating eye for the juicy trimmings... a particularly squalid and unsympathetic film."

The Los Angeles Times called it "cheerfully, almost consistently, low grade... never have we seen so many montages of so many legs – trousers and nylons – trudging up so many stairs... Lee approaches the role of Rosemarie with all the style and subtley of a tiger shark after a swimmer with a free bleeding cut."
