= Fabrizio Mioni =

Italian actor (1930–2020)

- Born: 23 September 1930; Rome, Lazio, Italy
- Died: 8 June 2020 (age 89); Los Angeles, United States
- Occupation: Actor
- Spouse: Maila Nurmi (m. 1961; div. 1977)

Fabrizio Mioni (September 23, 1930 – 8 June 2020) was an Italian actor. He appeared in the films Roland the Mighty, Hercules, The Blue Angel, Get Yourself a College Girl, Girl Happy, The Venetian Affair, The Secret War of Harry Frigg and The Pink Jungle. He appeared in the television series Goodyear Theatre, The Lineup, Bronco, Bourbon Street Beat, Alcoa Presents: One Step Beyond, Markham, General Electric Theater, Death Valley Days, 77 Sunset Strip, The Lloyd Bridges Show, Breaking Point, Dr. Kildare, Bonanza, Perry Mason, The Man from U.N.C.L.E., The Virginian, The Long, Hot Summer, Occasional Wife, I Spy, The Girl from U.N.C.L.E., The Big Valley, Garrison's Gorillas, The Rat Patrol, The High Chaparral, To Rome with Love and Love, American Style.

== Filmography ==
Year	Title	Role	Notes
1955	Folgore Division	Lt. Gianluigi Corsini	
1956	Roland the Mighty	Rinaldo	
1956	Mamma sconosciuta	Marco	
1957	El Alamein	Tenente Gianluigi Corsini	Uncredited
1958	Hercules	Jason	
1959	Hercules Unchained	Jason	Uncredited
1959	The Blue Angel	Rolf	
1964	Get Yourself a College Girl	Armand	
1965	Girl Happy	Romano	
1966	The Venetian Affair	Russo	
1968	The Secret War of Harry Frigg	Lt. Rossano	
1968	The Pink Jungle	Coronel Celaya	
