= Constantine and the Cross =

1961 film

- Home video cover
- Directed by: Lionello De Felice
- Screenplay by: Ennio De Concini; Lionello De Felice; Diego Fabbri; Ernesto Guida; Franco Rossetti; Guglielmo Santangelo
- Story by: Fulvio Palmieri
- Produced by: Joseph E. Levine; Ferdinand Felicioni
- Starring: Cornel Wilde; Belinda Lee; Massimo Serato
- Cinematography: Massimo Dallamano
- Edited by: Mario Serandrei; Gabriele Varriale
- Music by: Mario Nascimbene
- Production companies: Jonia Film; Jadran Film; Beaver Attractions
- Distributed by: Variety Distribution
- Release date: January 1961 (Italy)
- Running time: 120 minutes
- Countries: Italy; Yugoslavia

Constantine and the Cross (Italian: Costantino il grande) is a 1961 historical drama film about the early career of the emperor Constantine, who first legalized and then adopted Christianity in the early 4th century. The fictionalised film only stretches as far into his life as the Battle of the Milvian Bridge in AD 312.

It was also known as Constantine the Great or Constantino il Grande - In Hoc Signo Vinces.

== Premise ==
Constantine wins a battle and is sent to Rome. On the way he and his friend Hadrian are attacked by bandits. Hadrian is nursed back to health by some Christians, including Livia, who falls in love with Hadrian. Constantine discovers the bandits were sent by Maxentius, Constantine's rival for power.

Constantine watches some Christians be eaten by the lions. He jumps into the arena to defend a surviving child, and asks for the other Christians to be set free.

Livia is arrested. Hadrian, who has fallen in love with her, arranges for her to escape from prison. Constantine is blamed, and branded a traitor by the Romans. Constantine leaves his bride to be, Princes Fausta, and learns from his dying father, the Emperor of Gaul, that his mother Helena is a Christian.

Maxentius persecutes Christians and attacks Constantine in Gaul. Constantinus defeats Maxientus and becomes Emperor of Rome alongside Fausta, while Helena blesses them both.

== Cast ==
- Cornel Wilde as Constantine
- Belinda Lee as Fausta
- Massimo Serato as Maxentius
- Christine Kaufmann as Livia
- Fausto Tozzi as Hadrian
- Tino Carraro as Maximian
- Carlo Ninchi as Constantius Chlorus
- Vittorio Sanipoli as Apuleius
- Nando Gazzolo as Licinius
- Annibale Ninchi as Galarius
- Elisa Cegani as Helena
- Franco Fantasia as Roman Soldier
- Loris Gizzi as Roman Prosecutor
- Enrico Glori as Livia's Father
- Jole Mauro as Celi
- Nando Tamberlani as Diocletian
- Renato Terra as Jailer
- Lauro Gazzolo as Amodius

== Production ==
Filming took place in August 1960, with locations in Yugoslavia and studio work in Rome. While filming a scene in Rome Cornel Wilde was scratched by a lion. Filming was completed by November.

== Release ==
Constantine and the Cross was released in Italy in January 1961. It was released in the United States in December 1962.

== Reception ==
The New York Times called it "one of those ponderous costumed tabloids that's trampled history to death and turned what's left of its fragments into boring banalities."

The Monthly Film Bulletin said "the familiar ingredients of this tired spectacle - lions, fair haired Christian girls, torture chambers, battles, assassination attempts, intrigue - fail to arouse any noticeable excitement in the director or the cast."

The movie was one of Belinda Lee's more widely seen European films.

According to Gary Smith, film historian " The film is memorable for its impressive battle scenes (reused in countless peplum films for years to come) and because of the striking presence of Belinda Lee as Constantine’s wife Fausta."
