= The Secret War of Harry Frigg =

1968 film by Jack Smight

- Directed by: Jack Smight
- Screenplay by: Peter Stone; Frank Tarloff
- Story by: Frank Tarloff
- Produced by: Hal E. Chester
- Starring: Paul Newman; Sylva Koscina
- Cinematography: Russell Metty
- Edited by: J. Terry Williams
- Music by: Carlo Rustichelli
- Production company: Albion Film Corp.
- Distributed by: Universal Pictures
- Release dates: February 29, 1968 (New York City); March 7, 1968 (Los Angeles); March 11, 1968 (United States)
- Running time: 110 minutes
- Country: United States
- Language: English
- Box office: $3,500,000 (US/ Canada)

The Secret War of Harry Frigg is a 1968 American comedy war film set in World War II. It was directed by Jack Smight and stars Paul Newman.

== Plot ==
Several Brigadier Generals (American, British, and French) are unexpectedly taken prisoner by the Italian Army while arguing military tactics in a sauna; this is a public relations disaster for the Allies. The Brigadiers are held in an Italian villa, run by the benevolent Colonel Ferrucci, as a luxurious version of a prison camp. Being all of the same rank, none is in command and they are forced to plan escapes by committee, with predictably ineffective results.

Meanwhile, Allied headquarters devises a plot to free them by sending in Harry Frigg. Frigg is a Private in the U.S. Army, a malcontent who has a history of escaping from military stockades. As incentive, he is promised a promotion to master sergeant after the generals have been freed. Accepting the mission, Frigg is "promoted" to Major General so that he will outrank all the prisoners, assume command and lead the resultant breakout. Parachuted behind enemy lines, Frigg allows himself to be captured, and, as planned, is imprisoned in the same jail as the Brigadiers. While they are initially skeptical of Frigg's rank, he has been given a few personal secrets about them that only a senior officer might be expected to know.

Frigg discovers a secret passage, which has potential for use during the getaway. It starts in his bedroom and takes him to the gatehouse outside the villa's fence where the owner of the property, Countess Francesca De Montefiore is living. The escape plan is put on hold when the two become romantically involved.

Eventually, it cannot be avoided any longer and the scheme is reactivated. On the eve of the group's intended breakout, Colonel Ferrucci announces that because of the low escape rate in the complex, he is to be promoted to Brigadier General at midnight the following night. The group decides to put their plans off by a day to ensure the Colonel gets promoted, despite knowing that his rank will be stripped once they do escape. During the celebration, a German Major arrives, and at midnight he announces that Italy has surrendered to the Allies, and everyone present—including now Brigadier General Ferrucci—are now his prisoners.

The Germans transfer the Generals to a high-security prison camp for officers. Escape seems hopeless. Frigg confesses to being only a Private, and is separated from the rest to be delivered to a basic holding camp for NCOs. Slipping away from his guard, he then breaks back into the officers' camp, subsequently freeing them all and capturing the Major in the process.

The film concludes with Frigg ending the war as a Sergeant Major; he is offered the opportunity to be in charge of a radio station, and a promotion to second lieutenant. While discussing the role, Frigg and his entourage pass the countess' castle. He dashes in to reunite with her and realizes that the villa is the perfect base for the radio station.

== Cast ==
- Paul Newman as Private / Major General / Sergeant / 2nd Lieutenant Harry Frigg
- Sylva Koscina as Countess Francesca De Montefiore
- Andrew Duggan as Brigadier General Newton Armstrong
- Tom Bosley as Brigadier General Roscoe Pennypacker
- John Williams as Brigadier Francis Mayhew
- Charles Gray as Brigadier Adrian Cox-Roberts
- Vito Scotti as Colonel / Brigadier General Enrico Ferrucci
- Jacques Roux as Brigade General Andre Rochambeau
- Werner Peters as Major Von Steignitz
- James Gregory as Brigadier General Homer Prentiss
- Fabrizio Mioni as Lieutenant Rossano
- Johnny Haymer as Sergeant Pozzallo
- Norman Fell as Captain Stanley
- Buck Henry as Stockade Commandant

== Production ==
The film was originally titled Back at the Front.

== Reception ==
The Secret War of Harry Frigg received mixed critical reviews. The film holds a 40% rating on Rotten Tomatoes based on five reviews.

== See also ==
- List of American films of 1968
