= This Desired Body =

- Directed by: Luis Saslavsky
- Written by: Juliette Saint-Giniez; Luis Saslavsky
- Produced by: Simon Barstoff
- Starring: Daniel Gélin; Belinda Lee
- Cinematography: Pierre Petit
- Music by: Henri Crolla; André Hodeir
- Production company: SB-Chaillot
- Distributed by: Les Films Fernand Rivers (France)
- Release date: April 1959
- Running time: 105 mins
- Country: France
- Language: French
- Box office: 942,092 admissions (France)

This Desired Body is a 1959 French film. It was also known as Ce corps tant désiré and Way of the Wicked.

== Plot ==
A young man, Guilaume, loses his job in Paris, and returns home to a seaside town, accompanied by Lina, a prostitute on the run from police. Guillaume's family, the Ferauds, runs a mussel packing factory with Henri Messardier. Henri is attracted to Lina but is unable to handle the fact she was a prostitute; he gets drunk and hits a workmate who insults her, accidentally killing him. He refuses to see Lina in prison and she marries Guillaume. Guillaume's sister Marinette adores Henri but he is unable to forget Lina.

== Cast ==
- Daniel Gélin as Guillaume Feraud
- Dany Carrel as Marinette Feraud
- Belinda Lee as Lina
- Maurice Ronet as Henri Messardier
- Jane Marken as Mme Féraud
- Antoine Balpêtré as M. Messardier
- Dominique Blanchar as La fille
- Georges Douking as Le commissaire

== Production ==
Filming took place in Paris in September–October 1958. Belinda Lee was still under contract to the Rank Organisation at the time.

== Reception ==
Variety called it "a sort of laborious version of And God Created Woman sans the snap and jolt of the latter. Result is a fairly plodding vehicle with some exploitation factors on its^theme and sex scenes. Otherwise its literary tone and unshaped characters limit this for stronger chances. abroad... Film has a good production, gloss but actors can not do much with their unclear roles. On-the-spot lensing in a little fishing village helps^."

Monthly Film Bulletin called it "a laborious romantic melodrama along the lines of And God Created Woman with a mussel-picking milieu but little else in the way of surprise. The actors can do nothing with their unshaped, conventional roles and literary conception. The late Belinda Lee gives an uninhibited but sympathetic performance in a part she was to make her own, the prostitute reformed, and the production has gloss; but all in all this was one of Miss Lee's more plodding vehicles."

Filmink called it " not a bad little movie, helped by location filming and a frank attitude to sex, and Lee looks terrific."
