= Fanfare for a Witch =

1954 novel

- First edition (UK)
- Author: Vaughan Wilkins
- Language: English
- Genre: Historical
- Publisher: Jonathan Cape (UK); Macmillan (US)
- Publication date: 1954
- Publication place: United Kingdom
- Media type: Print

Fanfare for a Witch is a 1954 historical novel by the British writer Vaughan Wilkins. It is set in Britain during the reign of George II. It is set against the background of the long-running dispute between George and his eldest son and heir Frederick, Prince of Wales.

== Bibliography ==
- Logasa, Hannah. Historical Fiction: Guide for Junior and Senior High Schools and Colleges, Also for General Reader. McKinley Publishing Company, 1964.
