= Femmine di lusso =

- Directed by: Giorgio Bianchi
- Written by: Roberto Gianviti; Oreste Biancoli
- Produced by: Dario Sabatello
- Starring: Ugo Tognazzi; Elke Sommer; Walter Chiari; Sylva Koscina
- Distributed by: Trans Lux (United States)
- Release date: 22 December 1960
- Running time: 95 minutes
- Country: Italy
- Language: Italian

Femmine di lusso is a 1960 Italian romantic comedy film directed by Giorgio Bianchi and starring Ugo Tognazzi, Elke Sommer, Walter Chiari and Sylva Koscina.

It was also known as Intrigo a Taormina, Love, the Italian Way, Luxury Vacations and Travelling in Luxury.

It was released in the US in 1965 as Love, the Italian Way.

== Premise ==
The screenplay concerns a group of passengers travelling around the Mediterranean on a luxury liner enjoying various adventures and becoming romantically involved with each other.

== Cast ==
- Ugo Tognazzi - Ugo Lemeni
- Elke Sommer - Greta
- Walter Chiari - Walter
- Sylva Koscina - Luciana
- Gino Cervi - Ugo's father
- Caprice Chantal - Elena Le Garde
- Mario Scaccia - Edmondo, the butler
- Belinda Lee - Adriana Bessan

== Production ==
In June 1960 it was reported the producer offered Maria Callas a role. Belinda Lee has a cameo.
