= Marie of the Isles =

1959 French-Italian historical adventure film

- Directed by: Georges Combret
- Written by: Pierre Maudru; Georges Combret
- Based on: novel by Robert Gaillard
- Produced by: Georges Combret; Yvette Combret
- Starring: Belinda Lee; Alain Saury; Darío Moreno
- Cinematography: Pierre Petit
- Edited by: Louis Devaivre
- Music by: Georges Van Parys
- Production companies: Tibre Film; Radius Productions
- Distributed by: Pathé Consortium Cinéma (France)
- Release date: 28 October 1959
- Running time: 100 minutes
- Countries: France; Italy
- Language: French

Marie of the Isles (French: Marie des Isles, Italian: I flibustieri della Martinica) is a 1959 French-Italian historical adventure film directed by Georges Combret and starring Belinda Lee, Alain Saury and Darío Moreno.

It was also known as The Wild and the Wanton.

== Cast ==
- Belinda Lee as Marie Bonnard
- Alain Saury as Jacques du Parquet
- Darío Moreno as Desmarais – le traître
- Magali Noël as Julie
- Folco Lulli as Le capitaine Le Fort
- Jacques Castelot as Le comte Cheneau de Saint-André
- Noël Roquevert as Barracuda – le pirate
- Philippe Hersent as Baillardel
- Jean Clarieux as Le moine
- Charles Bouillaud as Un excité
- Alexandre Rignault as Bonnard
- Luciano Benetti as La Perrière
- Jean Tissier as Le père Hampteau

== Production ==
The film was based on a novel by Robert Gaillard about the real life Jacques Dyel du Parquet which sold over 150,000 copies in France. The novel was published in the US, the first of Gaillard's novels to be so.

Belinda Lee's casting was announced in March 1959. It was one of a series of biographical roles she played in Europe.

Magali Noel fractured her ankle during filming in August.

== Bibliography ==
- Philippe Rège. Encyclopedia of French Film Directors, Volume 1. Scarecrow Press, 2009.
