= Blood Feud (1961 film) =

Italian film

- Directed by: Damiano Damiani
- Written by: Damiano Damiani; Cesare Zavattini
- Starring: Belinda Lee; Sylvia Koscina; Sergio Fantoni; Alberto Lupo; Pietro Germi; Lauro Gazzolo; Andrea Checchi
- Cinematography: Pier Ludovico Pavoni
- Music by: Roberto Nicolosi
- Production companies: Europa Cinematografica; Galatea Film
- Release date: 1961
- Running time: 87 mins
- Country: Italy
- Language: Italian

Blood Feud is a 1961 Italian drama film starring Belinda Lee.

It was also known as Il sicario, The Killer and The Hit Man.

== Premise ==
Riccardo, a debt-ridden industrialist, decides to kill his creditor. He hires Torelli, an old employee, who works as a mechanic and needs money.

== Cast ==
- Belinda Lee as Ileana Torelli
- Sylva Koscina as Carla
- Sergio Fantoni as Riccardo
- Alberto Lupo as Giulio Torelli
- Pietro Germi as Bolognesi
- Andrea Checchi as Frisler
- Lauro Gazzolo
- Margarita Puratich
- Bianca Doria

== Production ==
It was the second film directed by Damiano Damiani and was shot at Cinecitta Studios in Rome. It was one of Belinda Lee's last roles.
