= Mario Nascimbene =

Italian film composer (1913–2002)

- Born: 28 November 1913; Milan, Kingdom of Italy
- Died: 6 January 2002 (aged 88) Rome, Italy
- Genres: Chamber music, film score
- Occupations: Composer, conductor
- Years active: 1941–1990

Mario Nascimbene (28 November 1913 – 6 January 2002) was one of the best known Italian film soundtrack composers of the 20th century. His career spanned six decades, during which time he earned several awards for the innovative contents of his composing style. During his career he composed soundtracks for more than 150 films.

== Biography ==
Nascimbene studied composition and orchestral conducting at the "Giuseppe Verdi" Conservatory of Music in Milan under the guidance of Ildebrando Pizzetti, Following graduation he wrote several pieces for chamber music and ballet.

He was commissioned to write the soundtrack for the film "L'amore canta" (Love Song), directed in 1941 by Ferdinando Maria Poggioli, and the success of this film opened the doors of an entirely new career for him. He was one of the few composers in Italy whose career was based on his work in the cinema.

He was particularly appreciated for the revolutionary innovation of incorporating the sounds of non-orchestral instruments like that of a jaw harp or a harmonica, everyday noises (like the tick-tock of a clock, the ring of a bicycle bell or the ticking sound of typewriters in Rome 11:00) in a musical score, with the purpose to underline some particular film scenes.

After World War II he developed an artistical partnership with such famous Italian film directors as Giuseppe De Santis and Roberto Rossellini. His work found acclaim in the United States, where he was invited to Hollywood to compose the scores for famous films, including The Barefoot Contessa directed by Joseph L. Mankiewicz in 1954, Alexander the Great directed by Robert Rossen in 1956, The Vikings directed by Richard Fleischer in 1958, and Solomon and Sheba directed by King Vidor in 1959. These scores were conducted by Franco Ferrara, the great conductor and lecturer on conducting at many academies of music around the world.

== Awards ==
During his career, Mario Nascimbene won three Nastro d'Argento for Best Score awards in 1952 for Rome 11:00, in 1960 for Violent Summer, and 1968 for Pronto... c'è una certa Giuliana per te. He was also nominated for a David di Donatello Award in 1990 for his work on Blue dolphin - l'avventura continua. Although he did not win the prize that year, Nascimbene was awarded a "Career David" from the David di Donatello Awards in 1991 honouring his lifetime achievements in film music.

== Selected film scores ==
- Redemption (1943)
- Captain Demonio (1950)
- Operation Mitra (1951)
- It's Love That's Ruining Me (1951)
- Vacation with a Gangster (1951)
- Rome 11:00 (1952)
- The Adventures of Mandrin (1952)
- The Dream of Zorro (1952)
- Too Young for Love (1953)
- Love in the City (1953)
- The Barefoot Contessa (1954)
- Tragic Ballad (1954)
- New Moon (1955)
- Alexander the Great (1956)
- A Farewell to Arms (1957)
- The Quiet American (1958)
- The Vikings (1958)
- Room at the Top (1959)
- Subway in the Sky (1959)
- Solomon and Sheba (1959)
- Violent Summer (1959)
- Scent of Mystery (1960)
- Carthage in Flames (1960)
- Sons and Lovers (1960)
- Constantine and the Cross (1961)
- The Bacchantes (1961)
- Romanoff and Juliet (1961)
- Francis of Assisi (1961)
- The Story of Joseph and His Brethren (1961)
- The Happy Thieves (1961)
- The Mongols (1961)
- Barabbas (1961)
- Jessica (1962)
- The Changing of the Guard (1962)
- Light in the Piazza (1962)
- Disorder (1962)
- Charge of the Black Lancers (1962)
- Axel Munthe, The Doctor of San Michele (1962)
- The Golden Arrow (1962)
- Swordsman of Siena (1962)
- The Verona Trial (1963)
- The Camp Followers (1965)
- Where the Spies Are (1965)
- One Million Years B.C. (1966)
- Kiss the Girls and Make Them Die (1966)
- Doctor Faustus (1967)
- The Vengeance of She (1968)
- Commandos (1968)
- Summit (1968)
- The Mummy (1969)
- Story of a Woman (1970)
- When Dinosaurs Ruled the Earth (1970)
- Creatures the World Forgot (1971)
- Eneide (1971)
- Indian Summer (1972)
- Anno uno (1974)
- The Messiah (1975)
