= Rosemarie Nitribitt =

German high-class call girl and murder victim

- Born: Maria Rosalia Auguste Nitribitt; 1 February 1933; Düsseldorf, Germany
- Died: 29 October 1957 (aged 24); Frankfurt, West Germany

Maria Rosalia Auguste Nitribitt (1 February 1933 – 29 October 1957 (Note: The exact time of day of her death was found to be unsatisfactorily determined during the trial for her murder. See Guido Golla: Rosemarie Nitribitt. Recherchen und Theorien, BoD: Norderstedt 2013, pp. 128–129, 152–160.)), better known as Rosemarie Nitribitt, was a German luxury call girl whose violent death caused a scandal in West Germany during the Wirtschaftswunder years. The case gave rise to a novel, three movies and a musical.

On 1 November 1957, Nitribitt was found dead in her apartment in Frankfurt, Stiftstraße 36. Her death was alleged to have occurred three days earlier. Her body showed signs of strangulation and a head wound. Heinz Pohlmann, a businessman and friend of Nitribitt's, became the prime suspect. He had visited her on 29 October. A few days after the murder, Pohlmann was able to settle high debts and bought an expensive car, but could not explain the origins of the money; he provided contradictory information during questioning. He had embezzled money at his job. Pohlmann was charged with Nitribitt's murder but acquitted in July 1960 on grounds of reasonable doubt.

== Early life and career ==
Born in Düsseldorf, Rhine Province, Prussia, "Rosemarie" Nitribitt and her two younger half-sisters were raised in low-income conditions by their mother in Ratingen and Düsseldorf. The girls were placed in a juvenile home and after 1939 lived with foster parents. There Nitribitt was raped at the age of 11. Still in her teenage years, she began to work as a prostitute. She was later sent to juvenile correctional homes, from where she escaped on several occasions. She then moved to Frankfurt am Main, where, after a brief interlude as a waitress and model, she took up prostitution again and was arrested at the Frankfurt railway station in 1951.

According to people who knew her at the time, Nitribitt tried hard to disguise her humble origins in order to be able to keep up conversation in polite society and to attract more sophisticated customers. For example, she started learning English and French.

One of her regular clients gave her a car—a used Opel Kapitän—as a present. Others invited her to spend a Mediterranean holiday with them. Accordingly, she became very wealthy quite quickly, a fact which she demonstrated by buying a black Mercedes-Benz 190SL (a roadster which was to be colloquially referred to as the Nitribitt-Mercedes) with red leather upholstery in 1956; she would drive around Frankfurt in the car to solicit customers. Also in 1956, she moved into a luxurious apartment at Stiftstraße 36. The police later estimated that she had earned about 80,000 DM in 1956 (building a single-family house cost about 25,000 – 30,000 DM in Germany at the time).

== Death ==
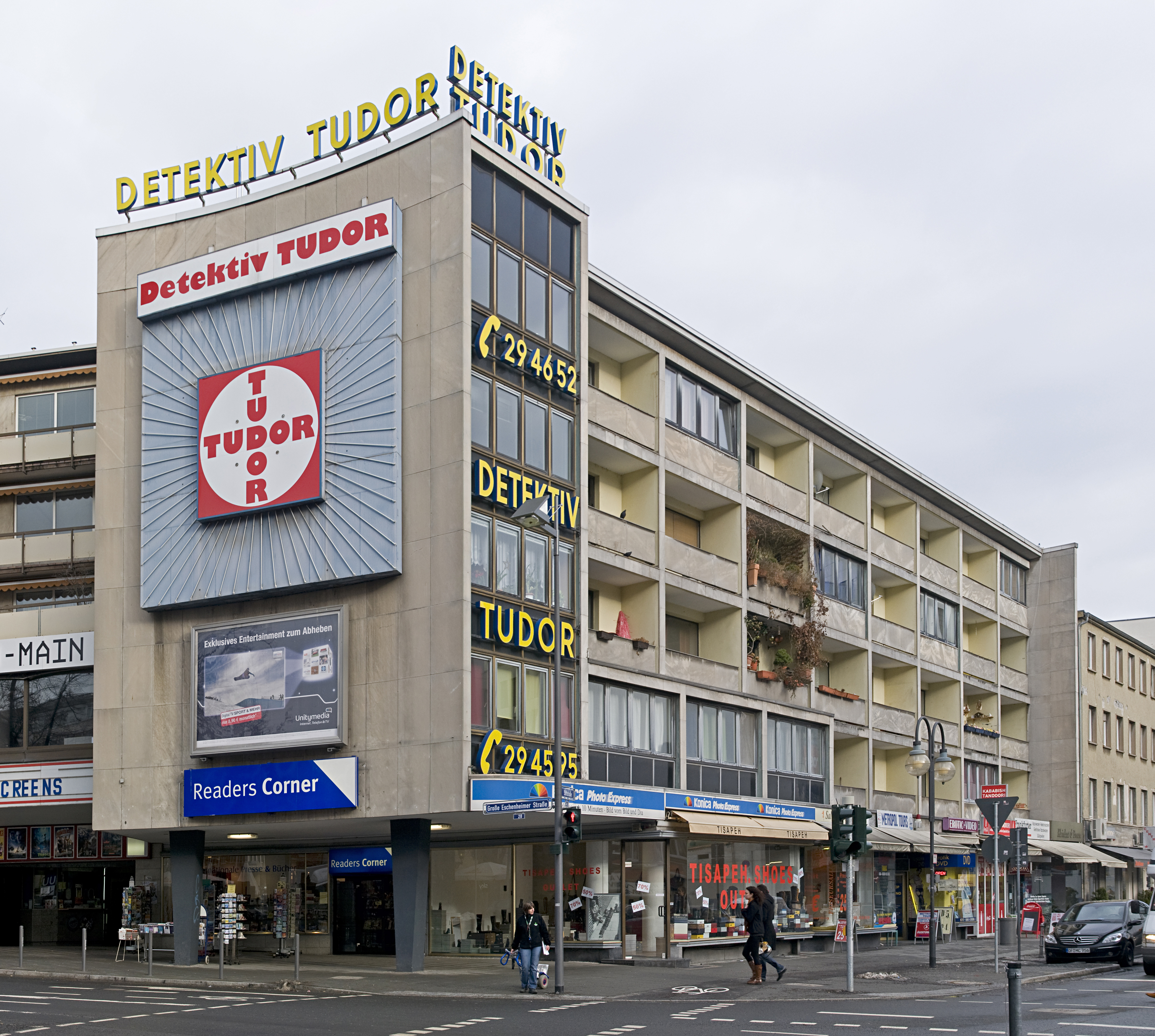
Crime scene in Frankfurt, Stiftstraße 36 (2010)

On 1 November 1957, she was found dead in her apartment in Frankfurt, Stiftstraße 36. Her death was alleged to have occurred three days earlier. Her body showed signs of strangulation and a head wound.

She was interred at the Nordfriedhof ("north cemetery") in Düsseldorf. Her head, however, was kept in police custody as evidence and later exhibited in the Kriminalmuseum ("criminal museum") in Frankfurt; it was eventually buried on 10 February 2008.

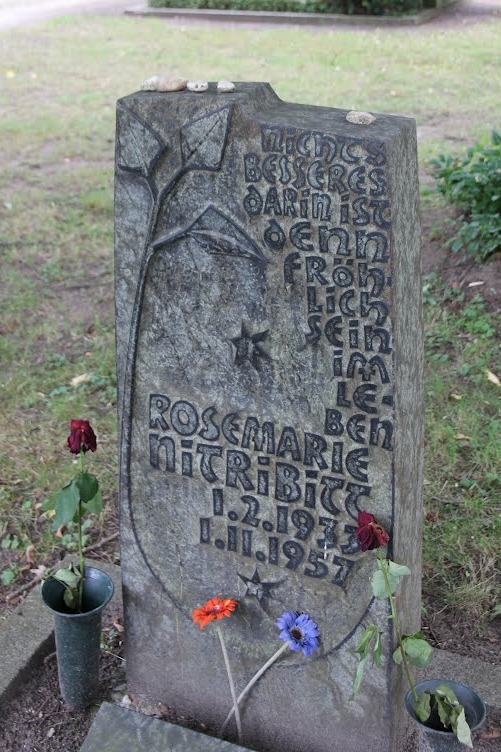
Rosemarie Nitribitt's grave, Nordfriedhof, Düsseldorf. Note the wrongly assumed date of death 1 Nov 1957.

== Police investigations and the trial of Heinz Pohlmann ==
Old police headquarters, Frankfurt am Main. Here the Frankfurt police worked on the Nitribitt murder case. Wall inscription – "Free".

Police investigations into the case were conducted very sloppily, with much evidence being destroyed during the first days. Several prominent citizens were exposed as her personal acquaintances, including Gunter Sachs and her close friend and benefactor Harald von Bohlen und Halbach, brother of Alfried Krupp von Bohlen und Halbach, head of Krupp industries.

Heinz Pohlmann, a businessman and friend of Nitribitt's, became the prime suspect. He had visited her on 29 October. A few days after the murder he was able to settle high debts and bought an expensive car, but could not explain the origins of the money; he provided contradictory information during questioning. He had embezzled money at his job. He was charged with her murder but acquitted in July 1960 on grounds of reasonable doubt. Pohlmann's lawyer had argued that the police had failed, on examining Nitribitt's apartment, to measure the precise temperature there, a fact which he claimed would have been essential in determining the exact time of her death. The prosecution did not appeal the acquittal.

When it became clear that the police would not be able to find the murderer, it was insinuated in the media that high-ranking personalities were trying to thwart any attempts at solving the crime.

== Aftermath ==
There is no evidence for the claim that Pohlmann wrote a book about the Nitribitt case after having served his prison sentence for embezzlement. In 1958, before his imprisonment, Pohlmann published several articles in Quick magazine instead, giving an explanation about the last days with Rosemarie Nitribitt from his point of view.

There was speculation that the 1959 unsolved murder of prostitute Blonde Dolly in the Netherlands was linked to Nitribitt's murder. Nine years after Nitribitt's murder, a very similar case occurred in Frankfurt. The high-class prostitute Helga Matura, who also solicited customers by driving a Mercedes, was murdered, and the case never was solved.

In 1968, a forged stamp circulated in Germany, showing a murdered Nitribitt and the text "Zehn Jahre Trauer [um] R. Nitribitt" ("10 years mourning [for] R. Nitribitt").

== In popular culture ==
A novel by Erich Kuby entitled Rosemarie: Des deutschen Wunders liebstes Kind (1958), based on the Nitribitt case, was turned into the film Rosemary (1958), directed by Rolf Thiele. The film stars Nadja Tiller (in the title role), Peter van Eyck, Gert Fröbe, and Mario Adorf. In this fictionalized film, Nitribitt is presented as just one of many entrepreneurs during the Wirtschaftswunder who wants her piece of the new fortune. Her clients include members of the West German industrial elite, but their business secrets are sold by Rosemarie to French competitors. However, when a scandal looms on the horizon, Rosemarie realizes that she cannot beat the system. Another film using the Nitribitt case for inspiration is Love Now, Pay Later (1959). A Girl Called Rosemary (1996) is a remake of the 1958 film by Bernd Eichinger, in which Nina Hoss played Nitribitt.

== See also ==
- Christine Keeler and the Profumo affair in England
- List of unsolved murders (1900–1979)
- Prostitution in Germany

== Bibliography ==
- Erich Kuby (1st ed. 1959). Das Mädchen Rosemarie. Liebe, Leben und Tod des Callgirls Rosemarie Nitribitt. Rowohlt: Reinbek 1998, ISBN 978-3-499-26015-5.
- Wendelin Leweke (1991). Gretchen und die Nitribitt. Frankfurter Kriminalfälle. Societäts-Verlag: Frankfurt am Main, ISBN 978-3-7973-0493-3.
- Martina Keiffenheim (1998). Edelhure Nitribitt. Die Rosemarie aus Mendig. Helios: Aachen, ISBN 978-3-925087-85-1.
- Christian Steiger (2007). Rosemarie Nitribitt. Autopsie eines deutschen Skandals. Heel: Königswinter 2007, ISBN 978-3-898807371.
- Guido Golla (2013). Rosemarie Nitribitt: Recherchen und Theorien. BoD: Norderstedt 2013, ISBN 978-3-732253-84-5.
