= Vaughan Wilkins =

William Vaughan Wilkins (March 6, 1890 – February 1959) was an English historical novelist and journalist born and raised in England. Wilkins was interested in Welsh history, and some of his stories have Welsh settings, causing some writers to mistakenly describe Wilkins as Welsh. He is known for his book Valley beyond time.

== Life and career ==
Vaughan Wilkins was born in Camberwell, London. His father, William Henry Wilkins, was a clergyman (born in Nottingham in 1857) and his mother, Charlotte Wilkins, née Law, a voice teacher (born in London). He married Mary Isabel Stanistreet and had two children.

Wilkins spent some time working as a journalist for the Daily Express. He was noted for his novel And So - Victoria about Queen Victoria, which became a surprise bestseller in the United States. Fanfare for a Witch focuses on intrigue in the court of George II. Wilkins also wrote two "lost world" fantasy novels inspired by Celtic mythology, The City of Frozen Fire (1950) and Valley Beyond Time (1955).

His grave is in the churchyard in Farnsfield, Notts and states that his birthplace was Ross-on-Wye.

== Written works ==
- Sidelights on Industrial Revolution (Jarrolds, 1925)
- And So – Victoria (Cape, 1937)
- Endless Prelude (Routledge, 1937)
- Looking Back To See Straight (Individualist Bookshop,1942)
- Seven Tempest (Cape, 1942)
- Being Met Together (Cape, 1944) ( Reprinted as Napoleon's Submarine, New English Library, 1972)
- After Bath, or, if you prefer, the Remarkable case of the flying hat… (Cape, 1945)
- Once Upon A Time, An Adventure (Cape, 1949)
- The City of Frozen Fire (Cape, 1950)
- [Introduces] Hermsprong; or, Man as he is not…by Robert Bage (Turnstile Press, 1951)
- A King Reluctant (Cape, 1952)
- Crown Without Sceptre (Cape, 1952)
- Fanfare for a Witch (Cape, 1954)
- Valley Beyond Time (Cape, 1955)
- And So – Victoria (Revised edition, Pan, 1956)
- Lady of Paris (Cape, 1956)
- Dangerous Exile (Retitled edition of A King Reluctant, Pan, 1957)
- Husband for Victoria (Cape, 1958)

History

- Endless prelude: an historical anthology
- Sidelights on industrial evolution

For children

- After Bath or (if you prefer) The Remarkable Case of the Flying Hat
