= The Goddess of Love =

1957 film

- Directed by: Viktor Tourjansky and Giorgio Venturini
- Written by: Damiano Damiani; Federico Zardi
- Produced by: Giampaolo Bigazzi
- Starring: Belinda Lee; Massimo Girotti; Jacques Sernas
- Cinematography: Arturo Gallea
- Music by: Michel Michelet
- Production companies: Faro Film; Prora Industrie Cinematografiche e dello Spettacolo; Rialto Film
- Distributed by: Variety Distribution
- Release dates: 5 December 1957; (Italy); 1961 (UK)
- Running time: 90 minutes
- Countries: France; Italy
- Language: Italian

The Goddess of Love (Italian: La Venere di Cheronea, French: Aphrodite, déesse de l'amour), also known as Aphrodite, Goddess of Love, is a 1957 Italian-French epic adventure film directed by Giorgio Venturini and Viktor Tourjansky, and starring Belinda Lee, Massimo Girotti, and Jacques Sernas.

It was shot at the Cinecittà Studios in Rome and is about the sculptor Praxiteles.

== Plot ==
Athens and her allies are at war with king Philip II of Macedonia. Luciano, captain of the Macedonian Army, gets wounded in action and is rescued by Iride, a model of extraordinary beauty who poses for the sculptor Prassitele.

Iride takes Luciano to the sculptor's home where he falls in love with her. Until that point, Prassitele had only considered Iride a model who he used for inspiration to create the statue of Aphrodite, but now he too feels passionately about the young woman.

Iride decides to run away with Luciano and to try to return to the Athenian camp. Prassitele then decides to take revenge on the couple by telling the Athenian soldiers about the two escapees. The soldiers chase them and shoot Luciano with an arrow. He is believed to be dead so Iride is sent back to Prassitele's studio.

She tries to forget about Luciano by seeing other men. Meanwhile, the Macedonians continue advancing and Prassitele is killed by the soldiers. After some time, Iride returns to Prassitele's house and while contemplating the unfinished statue of Aphrodite, an alive and well Luciano shows up. Iride confesses to him that she has been with other men and then tries to kill herself, but Luciano forgives her and affirms his love for her.

== Cast ==
- Belinda Lee as Iride / Aphrodite
- Massimo Girotti as Praxiteles
- Jacques Sernas as Luciano
- Claudio Gora as Armodio
- Camillo Pilotto as Polibius
- Elli Parvo as Helen
- Enzo Fiermonte as Timeo
- Maria Frau
- Luigi Tosi

== Production ==
Belinda Lee was borrowed from Rank Studios, who had her under contract. Lee had been spotted by the producers at the Cannes Film Festival who had been impressed by her beauty. Producer Nat Waschberger said Lee "typifies the girl I want for this role. The girl who plays it must have the perfect figure, for revealing costumes she will wear make this essential."

Lee arrived in Italy in early August 1957. It was made at the same time Diana Dors was making a film in Italy. "It's a sensational part," she said. "I have to show more of myself than I've ever done."

The film was going to be called Aphrodite but in October 1957 this was changed to The Virgin of Cheronea in order to avoid confusion with a rival Aphrodite film that was going to be made by Ben Hecht and Robert Haggiag.

During filming Lee began an affair with Prince Orsini which caused much publicity. Filming finished in September, after which Lee returned to London and left her husband. In October 1957 Lee told the press "I had a strict and very ladylike upbringing. When I went to Rome it was the first time I had been abroad on my own. It was marvelous. I even learned to swear."

== Release ==
In August 1959 the film was picked up for distribution in the US by Embassy Films. Rights eventually transferred to 20th Century Fox. In December 1960, a heavily cut dubbed version of the film was released in the United States by 20th Century Fox. A different and more faithful dubbed version, with Belinda Lee self-dubbing herself, was released in UK and Eire in 1961.

== Reception ==
Variety, reviewing it under the title The Venus of Cheronea, said it "might make a good exploitation item" adding "the camera remains focused on (Lee's) attributes, displayed in various forms of garb."Kine Weekly reported "The opening sequences impress, but early promise of mighty spectacle is not fulfilled," while Harrison's Report described it as "poor... horribly dubbed... badly enacted programmer for the undemanding".
