= The Nights of Lucretia Borgia =

1959 film by Sergio Grieco

- newspaper ad from 9 Sept 1960
- Directed by: Sergio Grieco
- Written by: Carlo Caiano; Sergio Grieco
- Starring: Belinda Lee; Jacques Sernas
- Production companies: Fidès, Musa
- Distributed by: Eroc (UK)
- Release dates: 1959 (Italy); September 1960 (USA)
- Running time: 113 mins (Italy); 92 mins (UK)
- Countries: Italy; France
- Language: Italian

The Nights of Lucretia Borgia is a 1959 Italian historical drama film. It was also known as Le notti di Lucrezia Borgia and Nights of Temptation. It was one of a series of sexually aggressive characters Belinda Lee played in European movies.

== Plot ==
Diana d'Alva is part of a family who are leading a conspiracy against the Borgias in medieval Italy. She is rescued from being attacked by Federico, a virtuous nobleman from an impoverished family.

Federico goes to serve Cesare Borgia. Cesare's sister Lucrezia Borgia desires Federico, but he is in love with Diana. Lucrezia's former lover, Astorre, is jealous of Frederico.

Frederico rescues Diana from the Borgias and kills Astorre in a duel.

== Cast ==
- Belinda Lee as Lucretia Borgia
- Jacques Sernas as Frederico
- Arnoldo Foà as Astorre
- Michèle Mercier as Diana d'Alva
- Franco Fabrizi as Cesare Borgia
- Marco Tulli as Jacopo
- Lilli Scaringi as Serafina
- Germano Longo as Ufficiale
- Nando Tamberlani as Duca d'Alva
- Raf Baldassarre as Ruggero

== Production ==
It was Belinda Lee's first movie after her contract with Rank ended. Filming ended by February 1959.

Jacques Sernas later made The Loves of Salammbo for the same director

== Reception ==
The Monthly Film Bulletin said the film had "sumptuous sets and costumes, an almost unbroken flow of sword and bodour play and the somewhat mechanical athleticism of its Fairbanks hero (Jacques Seras) all fail to lend this period confection the right kind of robust self-assertion. Since the scenes of eroticism and flagellation constituting the film's actual basic appeal have all been pared away, little remain to divert the undemanding but some memorably inappropriate dubbing and Belinda Lee's uninhibited resolve to come to grips with Lucrezia's villainy."

The film was released in the US in 1960. The Los Angeles Times said "Miss Belinda Lee proves that no really bad girl is Lucretia Borgia - just look out, though, for what she pourgia."

The New York Times said "Miss Lee, in a Veronica Lake hairdo, studiously imitates Mae West, but her elementary activities in the field of orgies will disappoint any former serviceman who caught Martine Carol's uncensored Lucretia overseas in one of the most popular tourist attractions ever filmed in France."

The San Francisco Examiner called it "a sort of solo Musketeer show. The more surprising thing about it is the grandiose score."
