= Roland the Mighty =

- Directed by: Pietro Francisci
- Screenplay by: Ennio De Concini
- Starring: Rik Battaglia; Rosanna Schiaffino; Lorella De Luca; Fabrizio Mioni
- Cinematography: Mario Bava
- Music by: Angelo Francesco Lavagnino
- Production company: Italgamma
- Release date: 6 December 1956 (Italy)
- Running time: 110 minutes
- Country: Italy

Roland the Mighty (Italian: Orlando e i Paladini di Francia) is a 1956 Italian film directed by Pietro Francisci. about the Battle of Roncevaux Pass in AD 778, where Roland, a knight in the service of Charlemagne was killed while defending the rear-guard of the Frankish army as it retreated across the Pyrenees.

== Plot ==
Charlemagne and Agramante are at war. The Saracen king devises a plan to weaken the opponent: he asks for a truce and sends the beautiful Angelica to the Frankish Kingdom with the intent of sowing discord among the paladins by creating a rivalry of love.

== Cast ==
- Rik Battaglia as Roland
- Rosanna Schiaffino as Angélique
- Fabrizio Mioni as Renaud
- Lorella De Luca as Aude
- Ivo Garrani as Charlemagne
- Cesare Fantoni as Agramante
- Clelia Matania as Mary
- Mimmo Palmara as Argalie
- Vittorio Sanipoli as Ganelon
- Robert Hundar as Balicante
- Rossella Como as Dolores
- Pietro Tordi as Ubaldo

== Release ==
Roland the Mighty was released in Italy on 6 December 1956 with a 110-minute running time.

== See also ==
- List of historical drama films
