= The Story of Joseph and His Brethren =

- Directed by: Irving Rapper (English version); Luciano Ricci (Italian version)
- Written by: Oreste Biancoli (Italian version); Ennio De Concini (Italian version); Guy Elmes (English version); Guglielmo Santangelo (screenplay); Guglielmo Santangelo (story)
- Produced by: Luigi Carpentieri; Ermanno Donati
- Narrated by: Terence Hill; Carlo Giustini; Finlay Currie
- Cinematography: Riccardo Pallottini
- Edited by: Mario Serandrei
- Music by: Mario Nascimbene
- Production companies: Cosmopolis Film; Ermanno Donati; Luigi Carpentieri; Jolly Film
- Distributed by: Colorama Features (US)
- Release dates: 30 November 1962; (US); March 1964 (UK)
- Running time: 103 minutes (US)
- Countries: Yugoslavia; Italy; United Kingdom
- Languages: English; Italian

The Story of Joseph and His Brethren (Italian: Giuseppe venduto dai fratelli) is a 1961 biblical drama film directed by Irving Rapper and Luciano Ricci.

The film is also known as Joseph Sold by His Brothers, Joseph and His Brethren (American DVD box title) and Sold into Egypt in the United Kingdom.

It was the last film of Belinda Lee.

== Plot summary ==
Joseph lives in the land of Canaan, where he is the favorite of his father Jacob's 12 sons. Joseph's brothers envy his favored position in the family and his uncanny ability to interpret people's dreams. When Jacob assigns Joseph to take a flock of sheep to sell, the brothers see their opportunity to be rid of him forever. They beat him and sell him to a slave trader. They then return to Jacob and tell him Joseph has been killed by a wild animal.

Joseph is bought by Potiphar, the pharaoh's superintendent of prisons. Potiphar's wife Henet is strongly attracted to Joseph and tries to seduce him. When he refuses, she falsely accuses him of attempting to rape her, and Joseph is thrown into prison. Later, when Potiphar learns what Henet has done, he kills her and then himself.

Joseph is joined in prison by the Pharaoh's butler and baker, who have fallen out of favor. The two have been plagued by dreams, which Joseph interprets correctly. When the Pharaoh himself has a dream he cannot decipher, his newly reinstated butler suggests he consult Joseph. Joseph interprets the dream to mean that Egypt will enjoy seven years of prosperity, followed by seven years of famine. Joseph suggests setting aside grain from the seven prosperous years in preparation for the famine. Pharaoh accepts the suggestion and appoints Joseph to take charge of the task.

Over the next several years, Joseph's power continues to grow. He marries a woman named Asenath and fends off an attack from the King of Syria. When the famine begins, Egypt has stored enough grain for itself, as well as some to sell to neighboring nations. When Joseph's family back in Canaan travel to Egypt to buy grain, his brothers fail to recognize him and Joseph shrewdly uses this to his advantage. He holds his brother Simeon (son of Jacob) hostage and orders the others to bring Jacob and Benjamin. Joseph reveals his identity and forgives his brothers.

== Cast ==
- Geoffrey Horne as Joseph
- Robert Morley as Potiphar
- Belinda Lee as Henet
- Vira Silenti as Asenath
- Terence Hill as Benjamin
- Carlo Giustini as Reuben
- Finlay Currie as Jacob
- Arturo Dominici as Rekmira
- Robert Rietti as Pharaoh
- Julian Brooks as Chief Baker
- Mimo Billi as Chief Butler
- Carlo Angeletti ("Marietto") as Benjamin as a Child
- Marco Guglielmi as Judah
- Dante DiPaolo as Simeon
- Charles Borromel as Dan
- Helmuth Schneider as Zebulon
- Loris Bazzocchi as Issachar
- Marin Marija as Asher
- Nino Segurini as Gad
- Tonko Sarcevic as Levi

== Production ==
Columbia Pictures had intended to make a film with this title for several years starring Rita Hayworth but it never came to fruition.

It was one of two films Rapper directed in Italy, the other being Pontius Pilate. Actors were signed in November 1960 and filming took place in Rome. It was one of several European films starring Geoffrey Horne.

Robert Morley was cast in a lead role. He wrote about his experiences making the film in an article saying:

The Bible belt is a trade term for films of a biblical nature made in and around Rome by Italian producers. It is their pleasant custom to engage senior British actors to play the more mature prophets and aging kings while casting young and virile Americans in the more saintly roles of John the Baptist, Joseph or St Francis of Assisi. The female roles are divided between Belinda Lee and Yvonne Furneaux, depending upon which of them gets back from the Venice Film Festival in time.

Morley set fire to Belinda Lee's wig in one scene but says she was unharmed.

Lee died in a car crash in the US on 15 March 1961.

== Reception ==
The New York Times called it "the clumsiest, the silliest, the worst of the quasi Bible stories to come along since wide screen was born... if you go see it, be prepared to howl."

The Monthly Film Bulletin called it "sedate and extremely prosaic."

The Daily Mail reviewing Joseph in 1964 said Robert Morely put a stern face on a monstrous piece of miscasting" and "we come away sadly reflecting that properly handled, which she so rarely was, Belinda Lee might have been groomed into some kind of English Loren."
