= John Davis (British businessman) =

English accountant and businessman (1906–1993)

Sir John Davis CVO
- Born: John Henry Harris Davis; 10 November 1906; London, England
- Died: 27 May 1993 (aged 86); London, England
- Education: City of London School
- Occupations: Accountant, businessman
- Known for: MD and chairman, Rank Organisation
- Spouses: Joan Buckingham (m. 1926, divorced) Marion Gavid (m. 1947, divorced) Dinah Sheridan (m. 1954; div. 1965) Felicity Rutland (m. 1976)
- Children: 2d; 1s

Sir John Henry Harris Davis CVO (10 November 1906 – 27 May 1993) was an English businessman and accountant. He was the managing director, later chairman, of the Rank Organisation.

== Early life and career ==
John Davis was born in London in 1906 to Sidney Myring Davis and Emily Harris. He was educated at the City of London School.

Davis became a member of the Chartered Institute of Secretaries. He was working as an accountant for a Welsh coal and steel company in Birmingham when he met Oscar Deutsch, a leading metal merchant based in the city who had begun to diversify into cinema ownership. In 1938 Deutsch invited Davis to become accountant for Odeon Cinemas, which by 1936 had become the fourth largest cinema circuit in the country.

== Rank Organisation ==
When Deutsch died in 1940 control of the company passed to J. Arthur Rank and he became very close to Rank. Davis became managing director of the Rank Organisation in 1948. He was largely responsible for Rank's consolidation of film production at Pinewood Studios and steered the company away from a financial crisis in 1949 and into a stronger financial position by diversifying the group's business. The day to day control of Rank films was held by Earl St John.

According to a 1952 book about Rank by Alan Wood:

John Davis cannot be called a popular figure in the film industry. “He does not understand people,” I have heard it said, “and people do not understand him.” He suffered from the jealousy and envy which always accompanies spectacular success; and from the resentment of men who had been in the forces during the war and came back to find him on top. Full allowance must be made, too, for the fact that Davis was obliged to do things which were bound to make him unpopular... Many puzzled guesses were made as to the reason why Rank gave such power to a man so different from himself in so many ways.

Wood went on to say "It is hard to imagine that anyone else could have matched the achievement of John Davis in straightening out and cutting down in the days when the Rank Organisation faced disaster."

In 1956 Davis arranged for Rank to buy stock in U.S. Haloid Co., which became Xerox Co. This turned into a financial bonanza for Rank.

In 1962, Davis became chairman of the Rank Organisation, succeeding the retiring J. Arthur Rank.

Davis was opposed to a quota for British movies.

Davis was knighted in 1971 and retired from the company as chairman in 1977 to become president. He resigned as president in 1983. He was appointed a CVO in 1985.

== Personal life ==
Davis married at least four times (some accounts say six). His wives include:

- Joan Buckingham, married in 1926, with whom he had a son, John Michael (known as Michael);
- Marion Gavid, married in 1947, with whom he had two daughters, Susan and Janet;
- actress Dinah Sheridan, married in 1954 (marriage dissolved 1965 - applied for a greater settlement in 1966);
- Felicity Rutland in 1976.

It has been argued that Sheridan may have been influential in her husband's selection of material when running Rank.

He bought a farm in 1944 and operated it until he sold it in 1986. In 1975 he had a public dispute with his deputy, Graham Dowson, after Dowson refused to marry a close friend of Davis' future wife - this resulted in Dowson being fired from Rank and given a pay out of £150,000. He died in Westminster, London on 27 May 1993.

== Legacy ==
Film scholars have recognised the character of the producer, "Don Jarvis" (Michael Goodliffe), in Peeping Tom (1960) as a caricature of Davis, who had clashed with director Michael Powell. Jarvis's main concern is to limit the budgets of the low-quality films he turns out.

Lewis Gilbert said Davis was "a monster" who "made so many enemies" but he always kept his word and never cheated people out of profits or a deal. Alan Wood wrote, "All descriptions of him agree on two points. Firstly, his complete grasp of organisation as a brilliant administrator; secondly, his rudeness."

Producer Frank Godwin said "in spite of his toughness, he could be quite witty on occasions. And considerate too... All the same, when that man was on the phone, you jumped. Incidentally, JD never offered any opinion on scripts or anything like that but - this may be my imagination - it was my impression that, after he married Dinah Sheridan, he took more interest in production." According to Richard Attenborough, Davis:

was probably as ruthless a man as I have ever come across. He was disliked intensely by almost everyone on the creative side of the British film industry because he was a bully who brought an accountant’s rationale to bear on every artistic decision. The subject of a film was irrelevant. All that mattered to JD was the balance sheet. Under his aegis, Rank began to pander to the lucrative US market by putting American characters played by failing American stars into British stories. As a result, the pictures lost their identity and, like the Europuddings of later years, became bland midAtlantic tosh that ended up pleasing no one.

Attenborough did admit though that Davis gave him assistance in developing Gandhi.

Filmink magazine argued:

Davis was skilled with boardroom politics and balance sheets, and a terrible manager of employees who was totally unsuited to running a creative industry. For all his supposed organisational genius, he owed a lot of his business success to patronage from a nepo baby (J Arthur Rank), luck (investing in Xerox, hiring Ralph Thomas and Betty Box) and government subsidy (the Eady Levy, the NFFC). Like a lot of CEOs, Davis ceased to have good ideas over time, stayed in his job for far too long, and had to be dragged from his office kicking and screaming. He helped forge Rank into a filmmaking powerhouse, while simultaneously ensuring that it would be a powerhouse of mediocrity.

== Notes ==
- Wood, Alan (1952). Mr Rank a Study of J Arthur Rank.
