= List of French films of 1960 =

French films released in 1960
Title	Director	Cast	Genre	Notes
America As Seen by a Frenchman	François Reichenbach		Documentary	
Austerlitz	Abel Gance	Pierre Mondy, Rossano Brazzi, Claudia Cardinale	Epic	French-Italian-Yugoslavian co-production
Between Love and Duty	Claude Autant-Lara	Laurent Terzieff, Erika Remberg, Horst Frank	Drama, war	French-Italian co-production
Blood and Roses	Roger Vadim	Mel Ferrer, Elsa Martinelli, Annette Vadim	Horror	French-Italian co-production
Les Bonnes Femmes	Claude Chabrol	Bernadette Lafont, Clotilde Joano, Lucile Saint-Simon	Drama	French-Italian co-production
Boulevard	Julien Duvivier	Jean-Pierre Léaud, Monique Brienne, Pierre Mondy, Magali Noël	Comedy, drama	
Breathless	Jean-Luc Godard	Jean-Paul Belmondo, Jean Seberg, Daniel Boulanger	Drama	
Captain Blood	André Hunebelle	Jean Marais, Bourvil, Elsa Martinelli	Adventure	French-Italian co-production
Classe tous risques	Claude Sautet	Lino Ventura, Sandra Milo	Crime	French-Italian co-production
Dialogue of the Carmelites	Raymond Léopold Bruckberger, Philippe Agostini	Jeanne Moreau, Alida Valli, Madeleine Renaud, Pascale Audret, Pierre Brasseur, Jean-Louis Barrault	Drama historical	French-Italian co-production
Everybody Go Home	Luigi Comencini	Alberto Sordi, Martin Balsam, Serge Reggiani	Comedy, war	Italian-French co-production
Every Minute Counts	Robert Bibal	Dominique Wilms, Raymond Souplex	Crime	
Eyes Without a Face	Georges Franju	Pierre Brasseur, Alida Valli, Édith Scob	Horror	French-Italian co-production
Fortunat	Alex Joffé	Bourvil, Michèle Morgan, Gaby Morlay	Drama	French-Italian co-production
The Giants of Thessaly	Riccardo Freda	Roland Carey, Ziva Rodann, Alberto Farnese	Adventure, fantasy	Italian-French co-production
The Hands of Orlac	Edmond T. Greville	Mel Ferrer, Lucile Saint-Simon, Dany Carrel	Horror, thriller	British-French co-production
The High Life	Julien Duvivier	Giulietta Masina, Gustav Knuth, Gert Fröbe	Drama	West-German-Italian-French co-production
The Hole	Jacques Becker	Michel Constantin, Jean Keraudy, Philippe Leroy	Drama	French-Italian co-production
Il bell'Antonio	Mauro Bolognini	Marcello Mastroianni, Claudia Cardinale, Pierre Brasseur	Comedy-drama	Italian-French co-production
Kapò	Gillo Pontecorvo	Didi Perego, Gianni Garko, Emmanuelle Riva	Drama, war	Italian-French-Yugoslav production
L'Avventura	Michelangelo Antonioni	Gabriele Ferzetti, Monica Vitti, Lea Massari	Drama	Italian-French co-production
La Dolce Vita	Federico Fellini	Marcello Mastroianni, Yvonne Furneaux, Anouk Aimée	Comedy-drama	Italian-French co-production
Le farceur	Philippe de Broca	Anouk Aimée, Jean-Pierre Cassel, Geneviève Cluny	Comedy	
Le Gigolo	Jacques Deray	Alida Valli, Jean-Claude Brialy, Jean Chevrier	Drama	
Le Petit Soldat	Jean-Luc Godard	Henri-Jacques Huet, Anna Karina, Michel Subor	Drama	
Jack of Spades	Yves Allégret	Eddie Constantine, Marie Versini, Pierre Clémenti	Drama	
Les Jeux de l'amour	Philippe de Broca	Jean-Pierre Cassel, Geneviève Cluny, Jean-Louis Maury	Comedy-drama	
Les Scélérats	Robert Hossein	Michèle Morgan	Drama	
Les vieux de la vieille	Gilles Grangier	Jean Gabin, Pierre Fresnay, Noël-Noël	Comedy	
Love and the Frenchwoman	Henri Decoin, Jean Delannoy, René Clair	Sophie Desmarets, Jean-Paul Belmondo	Comedy	
The Loves of Hercules	Carlo Ludovico Bragaglia	Mickey Hargitay, Jayne Mansfield	Fantasy	Italian-French co-production
Mill of the Stone Women	Giorgio Ferroni	Pierre Brice, Dany Carrel, Herbert A.E. Böhme	Horror	Italian-French co-production
A Mistress for the Summer	Édouard Molinaro	Pascale Petit, Micheline Presle, Michel Auclair	Comedy	Co-production with Italy
Mistress of the World	William Dieterle, Richard Angst	Martha Hyer, Micheline Presle, Carlos Thompson	Science fiction	West German-French-Italian co-production
Morgan, the Pirate	André De Toth, Primo Zeglio	Steve Reeves, Valérie Lagrange, Lydia Alfonsi	Adventure	Italian-French co-production
Murder at 45 R.P.M.	Etienne Périer	Danielle Darrieux, Michel Auclair, Jean Servais	Mystery	
The Night of Suspects	Víctor Merenda	Geneviève Kervine, Christine Carère, Elina Labourdette	Crime	
No Burials on Sunday	Michel Drach	Philippe Mory, Hella Petri, Marcel Cuvelier	Crime drama	
Purple Noon	René Clément	Alain Delon, Maurice Ronet, Marie Laforêt	Thriller	French-Italian co-production
Ravishing	Robert Lamoureux	Robert Lamoureux, Sylva Koscina, Philippe Noiret	Comedy	Co-production with Italy
Rocco and His Brothers	Luchino Visconti	Alain Delon, Renato Salvatori, Annie Girardot	Drama	Italian-French co-production
Saffo, Venere di Lesbo	Pietro Francisci	Kerwin Mathews, Tina Louise, Riccardo Garrone	Adventure	Italian-French co-production
The Savage Innocents	Nicholas Ray	Anthony Quinn, Yoko Tani, Carlo Giustini	Adventure, drama	Italian-French-British-American co-production
Seven Days... Seven Nights	Peter Brook	Jean-Paul Belmondo, Didier Haudepin, Jeanne Moreau	Drama	French-Italian co-production
Shoot the Piano Player	François Truffaut	Charles Aznavour, Nicole Berger, Marie Dubois	Comedy-drama	
Stowaway in the Sky	Albert Lamorisse	Pascal Lamorisse		
Terrain vague	Marcel Carné	Danielle Gaubert	Drama	French-Italian co-production
Testament of Orpheus	Jean Cocteau	Jean Cocteau, Yul Brynner, Édouard Dermit	Experimental	
The Thousand Eyes of Dr. Mabuse	Fritz Lang	Gert Fröbe, Howard Vernon, Bruno W. Pante	Crime	West German-Italian-French co-production
Thunder in the Blood	André Haguet, Jean-Paul Sassy	Estella Blain, Harold Kay, Pierre-Jean Vaillard	Crime	
Tomorrow Is My Turn	André Cayatte	Charles Aznavour, Nicole Courcel, Georges Rivière	Drama, war	French-Italian-West German co-production
Trapped by Fear	Jacques Dupont	Jean-Paul Belmondo, Alexandra Stewart, Sylva Koscina, Claude Brasseur	Crime	French-Italian co-production
The Truth	Henri-Georges Clouzot	Brigitte Bardot, Charles Vanel, Paul Meurisse	Drama	French-Italian co-production
Two Women	Vittorio De Sica	Sophia Loren, Eleonora Brown, Jean-Paul Belmondo	Drama	Italian-French co-production
The Versailles Affair	Robert Vernay	Ivan Desny, Claude Farell, Pierre Dudan, Jean Tissier	Crime	
With Both Hands	Maurice Régamey	Yves Massard, Françoise Saint-Laurent, Louis Seigner	Crime	
Women Are Like That	Bernard Borderie	Eddie Constantine, Françoise Brion, Alfred Adam	Thriller	
Zazie dans le Métro	Louis Malle	Catherine Demongeot, Philippe Noiret, Carla Marlier	Comedy	

== See also ==
- 1960 in France
- 1960 in French television
