= Silvia Monfort =

French actress and theatre director (1923–1991)

- Born: Simone Marguerite Favre-Bertin; 6 June 1923; Paris, France
- Died: 30 March 1991 (aged 67); Paris, France
- Education: Lycée Victor Hugo, Paris
- Occupations: Actress; theatre director
- Years active: 1943–1986
- Spouse(s): Maurice Clavel (c. 1945–1950); Pierre Gruneberg (m. 1990)

Silvia Monfort (French pronunciation: [silvja mɔ̃fɔʁ]; born Simone Marguerite Favre-Bertin French pronunciation: [simɔn maʁɡəʁit favʁ bɛʁtɛ̃]; 6 June 1923 – 30 March 1991) was a French stage and film actress, theatre director, and cultural organizer. She was noted for her performances in classical tragedy, her leadership in establishing multidisciplinary theatrical institutions, and her recognition with national honours.

She was named a Knight of the Legion of Honour in 1973, an Officer of the Order of Arts and Letters in 1979, and a Commander of the Order of Arts and Letters in 1983. She died of lung cancer in 1991 and was buried in the Père Lachaise Cemetery in Paris.

She was the daughter of medalist Charles-Maurice Favre-Bertin and was married to Pierre Gruneberg.

== Early life and education ==
Silvia Monfort was born in the Le Marais district in Paris, on Rue Elzévir, near Rue de Thorigny. Her family had lived there for several generations. After her mother’s death, Monfort was enrolled in a boarding school, where she first attended the Lycée Victor-Hugo before completing her secondary school education at the Lycée Victor-Duruy.

At the age of 14, Monfort was allowed to take the Baccalaureate examination early due to her academic performance. Although her father had intended that she pursue a career at the Gobelins Manufactory, she instead chose to study theatre. She then began taking acting lessons with Jean Hervé and Jean Valcourt.

== World War II and the French Resistance ==
Monfort was active in the French Resistance during World War II; for this engagement she received the Croix de Guerre and the Bronze Star. After the war, she married Maurice Clavel.

== Cocteau, Vilar, and Théâtre National Populaire ==
In 1945, Monfort appeared in Federico García Lorca's La casa de Bernarda Alba. Her performance drew the attention of Edwige Feuillère, with whom she shared the stage in L'Aigle à deux têtes by Jean Cocteau. The play premiered in 1946 at the Théâtre Royal des Galeries in Brussels.

Through Clavel, she met theatre director Jean Vilar in 1947 and became involved with the Théâtre National Populaire (TNP). That same year, she performed in the first Festival d'Avignon, appearing in The Story of Tobias and Sarah.

Monfort played Chimène alongside actor Gérard Philipe in Le Cid, performed in Vilar's production of Cinna, and The Marriage of Figaro.

== Cinema ==
Monfort made her film debut in Les Anges du péché (Angels of Sin) directed by Robert Bresson, who would often cast non-professional actors. In 1948, she portrayed Édith de Berg in Jean Cocteau’s adaptation of L'Aigle à deux têtes, appearing alongside Edwige Feuillère and Jean Marais.

In 1955 Agnès Varda, who was a photographer for the TNP at the time, directed her first feature film, La Pointe Courte — often regarded as a forerunner of the French New Wave cinema. Recalling Monfort's involvement, Varda said: “She joined the project with enthusiasm and professionalism,” adding, “I truly believe she was happy to fight for a cinema of the future.”

After her separation from Maurice Clavel, Monfort shared her life with film director Jean-Paul Le Chanois and appeared in several of his productions. Despite an arm injury, she played a Polish prisoner under Le Chanois's direction in Les Évadés (1955) opposite François Périer and Pierre Fresnay. She also co-starred with Jean Gabin and Nicole Courcel in Le Cas du Docteur Laurent (1957) and appeared in Par-dessus le mur (1961), a drama exploring parent-child relationships.

Monfort also appeared as Éponine in Les Misérables (1958), directed by Le Chanois, alongside Gabin and Bourvil. In 1962, she played Myrtille, a Romani girl, in Mandrin with Georges Rivière and Georges Wilson. This film concluded her cinematic career and her partnership with Le Chanois.

== On the road ==
During the 1960s, Monfort toured with Jean Danet's travelling theatre company, the Tréteaux de France, performing both classical and contemporary plays. On June the 23rd 1965, Silvia wrote to Pierre Gruneberg: "I've convinced Danet to schedule a series of performances in September of The Prostitute and Suddenly, Last Summer under a big top around Paris (this way, the inconveniently returning directors will be able to see it there if necessary). Oh, I would have done what I could."

Monfort maintained extensive correspondence, writing daily to her companion Pierre Gruneberg, later published as Letters to Pierre. Danielle Netter, assistant director, wrote: "The Tréteaux de France, was an extraordinary theatrical tool that gave us the occasion to present Sophocles and other dramatic poets before the tenants of the HLM. And to hear a spectator declare to Silvia: 'It's as beautiful as a Western!' one evening, at the end of Electra, filled our tragedienne with joy."

== Tragedienne ==
Between 1945 and 1989, Monfort appeared in a number of classical and modern works by writers such as Racine, Corneille, Sophocles and Ibsen. She performed the role of Phèdre in five separate productions.

She acted in plays and theatrical adaptations by Maurice Clavel, such as The Isle of Goats and The Noon Terrace. She was directed by Roger Planchon at Villeurbanne in 1959 in Love's Second Surprise and by Luchino Visconti in Paris in 1961 in 'Tis Pity She's a Whore, alongside Alain Delon and Romy Schneider. She made appearances in Summer and Smoke (1953) and Suddenly, Last Summer (1965) by Tennessee Williams. She portrayed the Sphinx of Cocteau's The Infernal Machine in festivals and on television with Claude Giraud in 1963. She was The Respectful Prostitute of Jean-Paul Sartre (1965) and The Duchess of Malfi alongside Raf Vallone (1981).

At her theatre, Carré Thorigny, she helped launch the career of Bernard Giraudeau, who debuted in Tom Eyen's Why Doesn't Anna's Dress Want to Come off (1974). She also appeared in The Oresteia (1962) and The Persians of Aeschylus (1984). She portrayed Lucrezia Borgia in Victor Hugo (1975), Marguerite de Bourgogne in The Tower of Nesle by Alexandre Dumas, père (1986), Alarica in The Evil Is Spreading (1963), Maid in Jacques Audiberti (1971) and Ethel in The Rosenbergs Should Not Die (1968) by Alain Decaux. She took on Ionesco with Jacques, or the Submission (1971), When We Dead Awaken by Henrik Ibsen (1976) and The Lady from the Sea (1977). To celebrate the centenary of Cocteau's birth, she made her final appearance on the Vaugirard stage in The Two Ways in 1989.

== Phèdre ==
Silvia Monfort's portrayal of Phèdre was analysed in a study published by the CNRS in Pour la Science, which examined the delivery and rhythm of several 20th-century interpretations of the role, including those of Sarah Bernhardt, Marie Bell and Natacha Amal. It also studied the fluctuations in delivery and noted that Monfort made extensive use of them (92% of pauses and 3.8 syllables/minute), similar to other tragic actresses included in the study. She described her approach to the character as exploring the intensity and mystery inherent in Phèdre, emphasizing personal interpretation.

In 1973, she said of her character: "Phèdre burns in each one of us. We have hardly grasped the image in the mirror when she dims, and the imminence of this obliteration sharpens the acuteness of the reflection [...] What matters is that there has been a meeting in mystery even from the first reading. It is like desire, or rather, it is present in the look that provokes it, or rather, there will never be unison. All the opinions, competent, imperious, singular, that were offered to me on the subject of Phèdre, and to which I listened intensely, had no other result with me than to lead me back to my Phèdre, despite her long being hazy, with the obviousness of a pawn moving back to the first square on a board game [...] this is the wonder of Phèdre: to tackle it is to resign oneself to it."

== Circus and mime school ==
In 1972, with support from the Minister of Cultural Affairs Jacques Duhamel, Monfort established and directed the Carré Thorigny, Rue de Thorigny in the Le Marais district of Paris, where she put on multidisciplinary shows. She held a particular interest in the circus world and organized an exhibit, Circus in Color. In 1974, after forming professional relationships with circus artist Alexis Gruss, Monfort organised traditional-style circus performances in the courtyard of the Hôtel Salé, in front of the Carré. In 1974, the public's fancy led Monfort and Gruss to establish the first circus and mime school in France, L'école au Carré. They sought to highlight the historical significance and traditions of the circus arts and were involved in bringing to life an updated old-style circus. The Gruss Circus followed Monfort in her next moves until it became a national circus in 1982.

At the Carré Thorigny, Alain Decaux awarded Monfort the Legion of Honor in 1973, paying homage to "her passion for the theatre and the inflexible will with which she serves it."

Due to the redevelopment of the property in 1974, the Carré relocated to the former Théâtre de la Gaîté-Lyrique, reopening as the Nouveau Carréon 1 October. Monfort then set up the Gruss Circus' big top in the square in front of the theatre. The Nouveau Carré (officially the Centre d'Action Culturelle de Paris) — or "Paris Cultural Center" — eventually encompassed the main theatre, two smaller houses for music and more intimate shows, the circus and schools for circus and mime.

From 1978 to 1979, the circus was moved under a new big top in the Jardin d'Acclimatation. In 1980, when the Gaîté Lyrique theatre was renovated, she had to relocate her Carré (now Carré-Silvia Monfort) to the site of the former Vaugirard's abattoirs, where she set up the theatre under a specially built big top and brought along the Gruss circus' big top. The circus school relocated to another facility. Meanwhile, the project of renovating the Gaîté-Lyrique was abandoned due to a lack of funding.

She continued working to establish a permanent "Carré" at Vaugirard on the site of and in place of the big tops. The decision to build the theatre in its current form was made in 1986. On 7 March 1989, she wrote: "This will be my theatre. Even so, incredible! I don't know a single living person for whom his theatre was built, with his name and of the right size." However, she died a few months before its completion. Inaugurated in 1992, the theatre bears her name: Théâtre Silvia-Monfort.

Monfort died of lung cancer on 30 March 1991, in Courchevel.

== The Silvia Monfort Prize ==
Pierre Gruneberg, whom Silvia Monfort married in 1990, founded the Silvia Monfort Prize Association in 1996. This prize is issued every two years to a young actress by a professional panel. Since its inception, the prize winners have been:

1. Smadi Wolfman (1996)
2. Rachida Brakni (1998)
3. Mona Abdel Hadi (2000)
4. Isabelle Joly (2002)
5. Marion Bottolier (2004)
6. Gina Ndjemba (2006)
7. Camille de Sablet (2008)
8. Lou Chauvain (2010)
9. Juliet Doucet (2014)

== Work ==
=== Filmography ===
- 1943: Les Anges du pêché (by Robert Bresson) (with Renée Faure) - Agnès
- 1947: The Great Maguet (by Roger Richebé) (with Madeleine Robinson) - Anaïs Arnold
- 1948: L'Aigle à deux têtes (by Jean Cocteau) (with Edwige Feuillère and Jean Marais) - Édith de Berg
- 1949: The Secret of Mayerling (by Jean Delannoy) (with Jean Marais) - L'archiduchesse Stéphanie
- 1955: Les Évadés (by Jean-Paul Le Chanois) (with Pierre Fresnay and François Périer) - Wanda
- 1955: La Pointe Courte (by Agnès Varda) (with Philippe Noiret) - Elle
- 1956: Ce soir les jupons volent (by Dimitri Kirsanoff) (with Sophie Desmarets) - Huguette Laurent-Maréchal
- 1956: Le Théâtre national populaire (Short, by Georges Franju) (with Jean Vilar)
- 1957: The Case of Doctor Laurent (by Jean-Paul Le Chanois) (with Jean Gabin and Nicole Courcel) - Catherine Loubet
- 1958: Les Misérables (by Jean-Paul Le Chanois) (with Jean Gabin and Bourvil) - Eponine Thénardier
- 1959: Du rififi chez les femmes (by Alex Joffé) (with Robert Hossein and Roger Hanin) - Yoko
- 1960: La Française et l'amour (sketch La Femme seule) (by Jean-Paul Le Chanois) (with Robert Lamoureux and Martine Carol) - Gilberte Dumas (segment "Femme seule, La")
- 1961: Par-dessus le mur (by Jean-Paul Le Chanois) - Simone
- 1962: Mandrin (by Jean-Paul Le Chanois) (with Georges Rivière and Georges Wilson) - Myrtille
- 1963: L'itinéraire marin (by Jean Rollin)
- 1970: Le revolver et la rose (by Jean Desvilles)
- 1975: Jean Marais, artisan du rêve (Short, by Gérard Devillers) - Narrator
- 1978: Nuova Colonia (by Patrick Bureau) - La Spera

=== Theatre ===
Private theatres, TNP and Tréteaux de France

- 1945: Joan of Arc by Charles Péguy (Dreux)
- 1945: La casa de Bernarda Alba by Federico García Lorca (Studio des Champs-Élysées)
- 1946: L'Aigle à deux têtes by Jean Cocteau (Théâtre Hébertot)
- 1947: L'Histoire de Tobie et de Sara by Paul Claudel (1st festival d'Avignon)
- 1948: Shéhérazade by Jules Supervielle (Festival d'Avignon)
- 1949: Pas d'amour by Ugo Betti, adaptation de Maurice Clavel (théâtre des Noctambules)
- 1950: Andromaque by Racine (Nîmes)
- 1951: Maguelone by Maurice Clavel (Théâtre Marigny)
- 1951: Electra by Sophocles, adaptation by Maurice Clavel (Mardis de l'œuvre, Théâtre des Noctambules)
- 1952: Les Radis creux by Jean Meckert (Théâtre de Poche)
- 1952: Doña Rosita la soltera by Federico García Lorca (Mardis de l'œuvre, Théâtre des Noctambules)
- 1953: The Isle of Goats by Ugo Betti, adaptation by Maurice Clavel (Noctambules)
- 1953: Le Chevalier des neiges by Boris Vian (Caen)
- 1953: The Merchant of Venice by Shakespeare (Noctambules)
- 1953: Summer and Smoke by Tennessee Williams (Théâtre de l'Œuvre)
- 1954: Le Cid by Corneille (TNP)
- 1954: Cinna by Corneille (TNP)
- 1955: Penthesilea by Heinrich Von Kleist (Théâtre Hébertot)
- 1956: Marie Stuart by Friedrich Schiller (Théâtre du Vieux-Colombier)
- 1956: The Marriage of Figaro by Beaumarchais (TNP)
- 1957: Pitié pour les héros by M.A. Baudy (Comédie de Paris)
- 1959: Love's Second Surprise by Marivaux (Villeurbanne)
- 1959: Bérénice by Racine (Festival de Dijon)
- 1959: La Machine infernale by Jean Cocteau (Festival de Vaison-la-Romaine)
- 1959: Lady Godiva by Jean Canolle (Festivals, Théâtre Moderne, Théâtre Édouard VII)
- 1960: Edward II by Christopher Marlowe (Villeurbanne)
- 1960: Love's Second Surprise by Marivaux (Villeurbanne)
- 1960: Si la foule nous voit ensemble by Claude Bal (Théâtre de Paris)
- 1960: Arden of Faversham (Festivals de Dijon et de Vaison-la-Romaine)
- 1960: Phèdre by Racine (Théâtre du Vieux-Colombier, tournée Européenne)
- 1961: 'Tis Pity She's a Whore by John Ford (Théâtre de Paris)
- 1962: The Oresteia by Aeschylus, adapted by Paul Claudel
- 1962: La Nuit de feu by Marcelle Maurette (Port-Royal)
- 1962: Helen by Euripides, adaptation by Jean Canolle (Narbonne)
- 1962: Horace by Corneille (Scala de Milan)
- 1963: The Evil Is Spreading by Jacques Audiberti (Théâtre La Bruyère)
- 1963: The Governess by Vitaliano Brancati (Théâtre en Rond)
- 1963: Marie Stuart by Friedrich Schiller (Les Nuits de Bourgogne)
- 1964: Life Is but a Dream by Pedro Calderón de la Barca (Festival d'Annecy)
- 1964: Julius Caesar by Shakespeare (Théâtre Sarah Bernhardt, Lyon)
- 1964: Catharsis by Michel Parent (Dijon)
- 1965: Suddenly, Last Summer by Tennessee Williams (Tréteaux de France, Mathurins)
- 1965: The Respectful Prostitute by Jean-Paul Sartre (Tréteaux de France, Mathurins)
- 1965: The Story of Tobias and Sarah by Paul Claudel (Les Nuits de Bourgogne)
- 1965: Electra by Sophocles, adaptation de Maurice Clavel (Festival d'Annecy, Tréteaux de France)
- 1965: Enemies by Maxim Gorky (Théâtre des Amandiers Nanterre)
- 1965: La Surprise de l'amour by Marivaux (Théâtre des Amandiers Nanterre, festivals)
- 1966: Electra by Sophocles, adaptation de Maurice Clavel (Mathurins)
- 1966: The Evil Is Spreading by Jacques Audiberti (Tréteaux de France)
- 1966: Suddenly, Last Summer by Tennessee Williams (Tréteaux de France, Mathurins)
- 1966: The Respectful Prostitute by Jean-Paul Sartre (Tréteaux de France, Mathurins)
- 1967: Phèdre by Racine (Tréteaux de France)
- 1967: The Evil Is Spreading by Jacques Audiberti (Tréteaux de France)
- 1968: The Rosenbergs Should Not Die by Alain Decaux (Tréteaux de France)
- 1968: The Respectful Prostitute by Jean-Paul Sartre (Tréteaux de France)
- 1969: The Rosenbergs Should Not Die by Alain Decaux (Porte Saint-Martin)
- 1970: The Respectful Prostitute by Jean-Paul Sartre (Halles de Paris)
- 1970: Electra by Sophocles, adaptation by Maurice Clavel (Halles de Paris)
- 1970: Jacques, or the Submission by Ionesco (Château de Boucard)
- 1970: The Maid by Jacques Audiberti (Nice)
- 1971: The Maid by Jacques Audiberti (Festival du Marais)

Carré Thorigny

- 1972: Opens October 12
- 1973: Le Bal des cuisinières by Bernard Da Costa (and at the festival d'Avignon)
- 1973: Phèdre by Racine
- 1973: Cantique des cantiques, oratorio by Roger Frima
- 1973: Conversations dans le Loir-et-Cher by Paul Claudel
- 1973: Cirque Gruss at the Hôtel Salé
- 1973: Jean Cocteau and the Angels, poetic soirée
- 1973: Louise Labé, poetic soirée
- 1974: Why Doesn't Anna's Dress Want to Come off by Tom Eyen
- 1974: Closes at the end of September.

Nouveau Carré Gaîté-Lyrique

- 1974: Opening of the circus School on October 15
- 1974, November and December: Les Comptoirs de la Baie d'Hudson by Jacques Guimet done by the "In and Out Theatre", Great Hall
- 1975, Edgar Poe, done by the "Ballet-Théâtre Joseph Russillo", Great Hall:

- January and February, Mémoires pour demain and Il était une fois comme toutes les fois
- May, Fantasmes, original creation

- 1975, January to April: Old-Style Circus with the Gruss family, Great Hall
- 1975, March to April: Seven Weeks in Song with Roger Siffer, Dick Annegarn, Jean-Marie Vivier and Monique Morelli, Serge Kerval and Anne Vanderlove, Gilles Servat, Great Hall
- 1975, June to July: Dimitri Clown, Great Hall
- 1975, September: Histoire du soldat by Igor Stravinsky and Ramuz, done by the Solistes de Marseille, directed by Devy Erlich, Great Hall
- 1975, September to October: Le Tableau, comic opera by Ionesco and Calvi, Great Hall
- 1975-1976, November to March: Lucrezia Borgia by Victor Hugo (presented at the Festival d'Avignon in August 1975), directed by Fabio Pacchoni, Great Hall
- 1976, March: Hélène Martin Recital, Great Hall
- 1976, March: Henri Tachan Recital, Gruss big top
- 1976, October, November, December: When We Dead Awaken by Henrik Ibsen, adaptation by Maurice Clavel, Great Hall
- 1977, January, February, March: The Lady from the Sea by Henrik Ibsen, Great Hall
- 1977, April to May: A Doll's House by Henrik Ibsen, done by the Ensemble Théâtral Mobile, Great Hall
- 1977: Songs of Bilitis by Pierre Louÿs
- 1977: Visit of René-Guy Cadou, poetic soirée
- 1977: Nuova Colonia de Luigi Pirandello
- 1977: The Burial of a Boss de Dario Fo (Mulhouse)
- 1977: Closes at year's end

Jardin d'Acclimatation

- Just one season, from 1978 to 1979

Carré Silvia Monfort Vaugirard

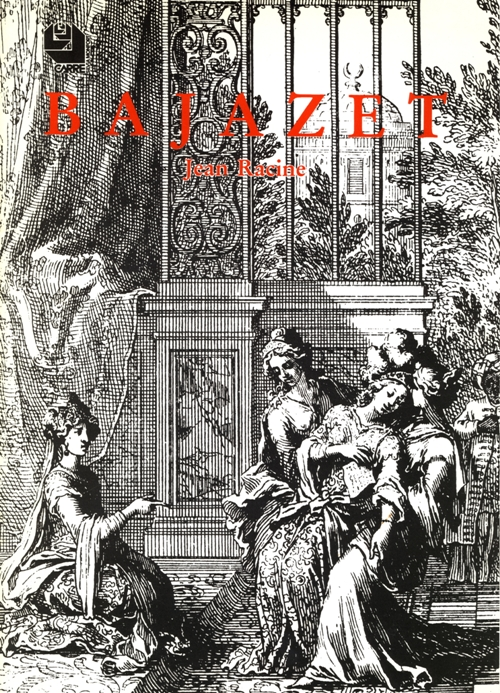
Bajazet - Original programme, 1985

- 1979: La Cantate à trois voix by Paul Claudel (Abbatiale de Rouen)
- 1979: La Fourmi dans le corps by Jacques Audiberti
- 1979: The Noon Terrace by Maurice Clavel
- 1980: Conversation dans le Loir-et-Cher de Paul Claudel INA Archives: Daniel Gélin and Silvia Monfort in Conversation dans le Loir-et-Cher (TF1, 1988)
- 1981: Ariane at Naxos by Georg Brenda (Rennes and Théâtre des Champs-Élysées)
- 1981: Breakfast at Desdemona's by Janus Krasinski
- 1981: The Duchess of Malfi by John Webster
- 1982: Phèdre by Racine
- 1983: Hot and Cold by Fernand Crommelynck
- 1984: The Persians by Aeschylus
- 1984: Die Panne by Friedrich Dürrenmatt
- 1985: The Millionairess by George Bernard Shaw
- 1985: Bajazet by Racine
- 1985: The Tower of Nesle by Alexandre Dumas, père
- 1987: Britannicus by Racine
- 1987: Iphigénie by Racine
- 1988: Théodore by Corneille
- 1989: The Two Ways by Jean Cocteau

Directed by her

- 1965: Electra by Sophocles, adaptation by Maurice Clavel (Tréteaux de France)
- 1970: Electra by Sophocles, adaptation by Maurice Clavel (Halles de Paris)
- 1979: La Cantate à trois voix de Paul Claudel (Abbatiale de Rouen)
- 1984: The Persians by Aeschylus (Carré Silvia Monfort Vaugirard)
- 1987: Iphigénie by Racine (Carré Silvia Monfort Vaugirard)
- 1988: Théodore by Corneille (Carré Silvia Monfort Vaugirard)
- 1989: The Two Ways by Jean Cocteau (Carré Silvia Monfort Vaugirard)

=== Television ===
- 1959: Bérénice by Racine
- 1960: Phèdre by Racine
- 1960: Bajazet by Racine
- 1962: Helen by Euripides
- 1962: The Night of Fire by Marcelle Maurette
- 1963: The Infernal Machine by Jean Cocteau - Directed by Claude Loursais
- 1965: King Lear by Shakespeare
- 1967: The Trojan war will not take place by Jean Giraudoux
- 1971: The Bunker by Alain Decaux
- 1975: Why Doesn't Anna's Dress Want to Come off by Tom Eyen - Directed by Armand Ridel
- 1978: The Marshal of Ancre by Alfred de Vigny
- 1980: Edgar Poe, theatre-ballet by Joseph Russillo
- 1980: Phèdre by Racine
- 1980: Electra by Sophocles
- 1981: Conversation in the Loir-et-Cher by Paul Claudel
- 1982: Phèdre by Racine
- 1982: The Dream of Icarus, TV film by Jean Kerchbron
- 1986: Bajazet by Racine
- 1986: The Tower of Nesle by Alexandre Dumas, père

== Bibliography ==
Novels

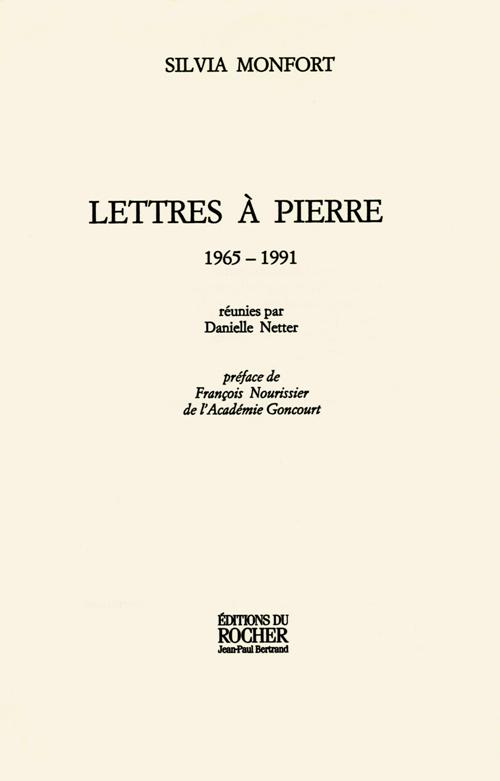

- Il ne m'arrivera rien (Nothing Will Happen to Me) - Éditions Fontaine - 1946
- Aimer qui vous aima (To Love Someone Who Has Loved You) - Paris, Éditions Julliard - 1951
- Le droit chemin (The Right Way) - Paris, Éditions Julliard - 1954
- La Raia (Les mains pleines de doigts) The Raia (Hands Full of Fingers) - Paris, Éditions Julliard - 1959
- Les ânes rouges (The Red Donkeys) - Éditions Julliard in 1966, then Éditions du Rocher in 2003 - ISBN 2-268-04554-4
- Une allure pour l'amour (L'Amble) (A Look for Love (The Amble)) - Éditions Julliard in 1971, then Le Livre de Poche in 1987 - ISBN 2-253-04055-X

Correspondence

- Lettres à Pierre 1965-1991 (Letters to Pierre 1965-1991) - Collected by Danielle Netter - Éditions du Rocher - 2003 - ISBN 2-268-04552-8

Prefaces

- Noël Devaulx: Le Cirque À L'ancienne (The Old-style Circus) - Henri Veryer ed. - 1977
- Racine: Phèdre - Le Livre de Poche - 1985 - ISBN 2-253-03781-8
- Corneille: Cinna - Le Livre de Poche - 1987 - ISBN 2-253-04094-0

Biographies and articles

- Paul-Louis Mignon: Silvia Monfort - Article from l'Avant scène théâtre, nr. 411, 1968
- Régis Santon: Le théâtre Silvia Monfort - Article from l'Avant-scène théâtre, nr. 531, 1973
- C. Parent: Le quinzième arrondissement - Le carré Silvia Monfort (The 15th arrondissement - Silvia Monfort Square) - the Paris collection and her heritage, p. 204
- Françoise Piazza: Silvia Monfort - Éditions Favre - 1988 - ISBN 2-8289-0358-3
- Guy Boquet and Jean-Claude Drouot: Le parcours racinien de Silvia Monfort (The Racinian Path of Silvia Monfort), Revue d'histoire du théâtre, nr. 206, 2000.
- Exhibit, Paris, Bibliothèque nationale de France, Richelieu site, Crypt, 16 December 2003 – 25 January 2004, Une vie de combat pour le théâtre - Bibliothèque Nationale de France - ISBN 2-7177-2282-3

Audio

- Cahiers de doléances des femmes en 1789 (Condolence Books of Women in 1789) - Cassette, La Bibliothèque Des Voix - Éditions Des Femmes - 1989
- Les Enfants terribles (see section "the children by the radio") by Jean Cocteau (1947) - CD, Éditions Phonurgia Nova & INA - 1992 - ISBN 2-908325-07-1

On video

- Le Cas du docteur Laurent - Film by Jean-Paul Le Chanois - single DVD, Zone 2 (Éditions LCJ)
- Les Misérables - Film in two eras by Jean-Paul Le Chanois - 2-set DVD, Zone 2 (Les Années Cinquante collection- Éditions René Chateau)
