= 1960 in France =

- Decades: 1940s; 1950s; 1960s; 1970s; 1980s
- See also: History of France; Timeline of French history; List of years in France

Events from the year 1960 in France.

== Incumbents ==
- President: Charles de Gaulle
- Prime Minister: Michel Debré

== Events ==
- 6 January – Manifesto of the 121 is published.
- 22 January – President Charles de Gaulle fires General Jacques Massu from Algeria following an interview in a German newspaper where he stated that the army may have made a mistake in returning him to power.
- 24 January – A major insurrection occurs in Algiers against French colonial policy.
- 13 February – France tests its first atomic bomb in the Sahara.
- 23 March – Nikita Khrushchev meets Charles De Gaulle in Paris.
- 12 April – Eric Peugeot, youngest son of the founder of Peugeot, is kidnapped in Paris. Kidnappers release him 15 April in exchange for $300,000 ransom.
- 27 April – Togo gains independence from French-administered UN trusteeship.
- 11 May – The SS France is launched for the Compagnie Générale Transatlantique at the Chantiers de l'Atlantique shipyard in Saint-Nazaire by Yvonne de Gaulle.
- 3 June – The first Carrefour store opens in Annecy.
- 20 June – The Mali Federation between Senegal and Sudanese Republic (now Mali) gains independence from France.
- 5 August – Burkina Faso (Upper Volta) declares independence from France.
- 17 August – Gabon gains independence from France.
- 28 November – Mauritania becomes independent of France.
- 5 December – Pierre Lagaillarde, who led 1958 and 1960 insurrections in Algeria, fails to appear in a Paris court. He has reportedly fled with his four fellow defendants to Spain, en route to Algeria.
- 9 December – President Charles de Gaulle's visit to Algeria is marked by bloody riots by European and Muslim mobs in Algeria's largest cities, killing 127 people.
- 14 December – The OECD is formed in Paris.
- 27 December – France sets off its third nuclear test blast at its atomic proving grounds at Reggane, Algeria.

== Arts and literature ==
- 25 March – Tom Pillibi by Jacqueline Boyer (music by André Popp, text by Pierre Cour) wins the Eurovision Song Contest 1960 for France.
- 10 November – Édith Piaf's recording of "Non, je ne regrette rien" is released.

== Sport ==
- 26 June – Tour de France begins.
- 17 July – Tour de France ends, won by Gastone Nencini of Italy.

== Births ==
- 2 January - Dominique Bailly, politician
- 23 January – Patrick de Gayardon, skydiver, skysurfer and BASE jumper (died 1998)
- 18 March – Jean-Pierre Bade, soccer player
- 18 May – Yannick Noah, tennis player and musician
- 15 June – Patrick Edlinger, rock climber (died 2012)
- 8 July – Yann LeCun, computer scientist
- 12 July – Corynne Charby, actress, singer and model
- 24 July – Catherine Destivelle, rock climber and mountaineer

== Deaths ==
- 4 January – Albert Camus, author, philosopher, and journalist who won the Nobel Prize in 1957 (born 1913)
- 12 February – Jean-Michel Atlan, painter (born 1913)
- 13 March – Louis Wagner, motor racing driver (born 1882)
- 1 April – Madeleine Rolland, translator and peace activist (born 1872)
- 23 May – Georges Claude, engineer, chemist and inventor (born 1870)
- 14 July – Maurice, 6th duc de Broglie, physicist (born 1875)

== See also ==
- 1960 in French television
- List of French films of 1960
