= Mich dürstet =

1956 film

- Directed by: Karl Paryla
- Starring: Edwin Marian
- Release date: 1956
- Country: East Germany
- Language: German

Mich dürstet is an East German film. The film was directed by Austrian socialist filmmaker Karl Paryla for the state-owned DEFA film studio. It was released in 1956. The film was based on a 1946 short story by Walter Gorrisch, "Um Spaniens Freiheit" (a story about the Spanish Civil War); Gorrisch also wrote the screenplay.

== Cast ==
- Edwin Marian - Pablo
- Isabell Carenato - Magdalena
- Harry Hindemith - Taga
- Uwe-Jens Pape - Carlos
- Maria Wendt - Pilar
- Curt Paulus - Jacinto
- Gert Beinemann - Pedro Bernardo
- Rolf Ludwig - Cerefino
- Harald Jopt - Lopez
- Charles Hans Vogt - Rodriguez
- Karl Block - Baptiste
- Friedrich Wolf - Gustavo
- Elfriede Florin - Barbara
- Else Korén - Rosita
- Rolf Ripperger - Edgar
