= Mandrin (1962 film) =

1962 film

- Directed by: Jean-Paul Le Chanois
- Written by: Claude Desailly; René Havard; Jean-Paul Le Chanois; Louis Martin
- Based on: Mandrin by Arthur Bernède
- Produced by: Henry Deutschmeister; Joseph Bercholz; Edouard Gide; Goffredo Lombardo
- Starring: Georges Rivière; Silvia Monfort; Jeanne Valérie; Dany Robin
- Cinematography: Marc Fossard
- Edited by: Borys Lewin
- Music by: Georges Van Parys
- Production companies: Films Gibé; Franco London Films; Titanus
- Distributed by: Franco London Films; Titanus
- Release date: 19 December 1962
- Running time: 126 minutes
- Countries: France; Italy
- Language: French

Mandrin is a 1962 French-Italian historical adventure film directed by Jean-Paul Le Chanois and starring Georges Rivière, Silvia Monfort, Jeanne Valérie and Dany Robin. It is based on the life of the celebrated smuggler and brigand Louis Mandrin who operated during the reign of Louis XV.

The film's sets were designed by the art director Anatol Radzinowicz. Location shooting took place around the town of Zakopane in southern Poland as well as the Château de Vigny outside Paris.

== Cast ==
- Georges Rivière as Louis Mandrin
- Silvia Monfort as Myrtille
- Jeanne Valérie as Antoinette
- Georges Wilson as Bélissard
- Dany Robin as La baronne d'Escourt
- Maurice Baquet as Court-Toujours
- Jess Hahn as Bertrand le braco
- Armand Mestral as Sigismond de Moret
- Albert Rémy as Grain de sel
- André Versini as Le marquis d'Ulrich
- Gil Baladou as Le ménestrel
- Tadeusz Bartosik as Le gitan Marco
- Leon Niemczyk as Le traître Grandville
- Claude Carliez as Un aristocrate
- Anatol Kobylinski as Un contrebandier
- Jean-Paul Le Chanois as Le confesseur de la baronne d'Escourt
- Krzysztof Litwin as Herold
- Artur Mlodnicki as Le sergent
- Leopold R. Nowak as Un contrebandier
- Wladyslaw Pawlowicz as Un soldat
- Georges Rouquier as Voltaire

== See also ==
- Mandrin (1924)
- Mandrin (1947)

== Bibliography ==
- Oscherwitz, Dayna & Higgins, MaryEllen. The A to Z of French Cinema. Scarecrow Press, 2009.
