= Roxy and the Wonderteam =

- Directed by: Johann von Vásáry
- Written by: Alfred Grünwald (libretto); Hans Weigel (libretto); István Békeffy; Adorján Stella; Karl Farkas
- Starring: Rosy Barsony; Fritz Imhoff; Hans Holt
- Cinematography: István Eiben
- Edited by: Andor Vidor
- Music by: Paul Abraham
- Production company: H.T. Film
- Distributed by: Europa-Film
- Release date: 14 January 1938
- Country: Austria
- Language: German

Roxy and the Wonderteam (German: Roxy und das Wunderteam) is a 1938 Austrian musical sports film directed by Johann von Vásáry and starring Rosy Barsony, Fritz Imhoff and Hans Holt. It is based on an operetta called Roxy und ihr Wunderteam. A separate Hungarian-language version was also produced. The title is an allusion to the Wunderteam, the acclaimed Austria national football team of the 1930s, and the film features an appearance by former captain Matthias Sindelar as himself.

The film's sets were designed by the art director Márton Vincze.

== Cast ==
- Rosy Barsony as Grete Müller
- Fritz Imhoff as Herr Müller, ihr Vater
- Hans Holt as Lazy - Kapitän einer Fussballmannschaft
- Hortense Raky as Margot
- Tibor Halmay as Bob, schottischer Hocharistokrat
- Ferdinand Mayerhofer as Gutsverwalter
- Oszkár Dénes as Baron Utvary
- Carmen Perwolf as Liesl
- Vilma Kurer as Mädchen vom Jachtklub
- Irma Eckert as Mädchen vom Jachtklub
- Éva Bíró as Mädchen vom Jacktklub
- Éva Libertiny as Mädchen vom Jachtklub
- Éva Somogyi as Mädchen vom Jachtklub
- Maria Horvath as Mädchen vom Jachtklub
- Matthias Sindelar as Himself - Footballer
- Geza Toldi as Fußballer
- Franz Zentner as Fußballer
- Erich Sprung as Fußballer
- Hans Bräuer as Fußballer
- Otto Falvay as Fußballer
- Béla Fáy as Fußballer
- Reggie Riffler (Reggie Nalder) as Fußballer

== Bibliography ==
- Waller, Klaus. Paul Abraham. Der tragische König der Operette: Eine Biographie. Zweite, überarbeitete Auflage. 2017.
