= Grand-Hôtel du Cap-Ferrat =

Hotel in Saint-Jean-Cap-Ferrat, France

Coordinates: 43°40′35″N 7°19′53″E

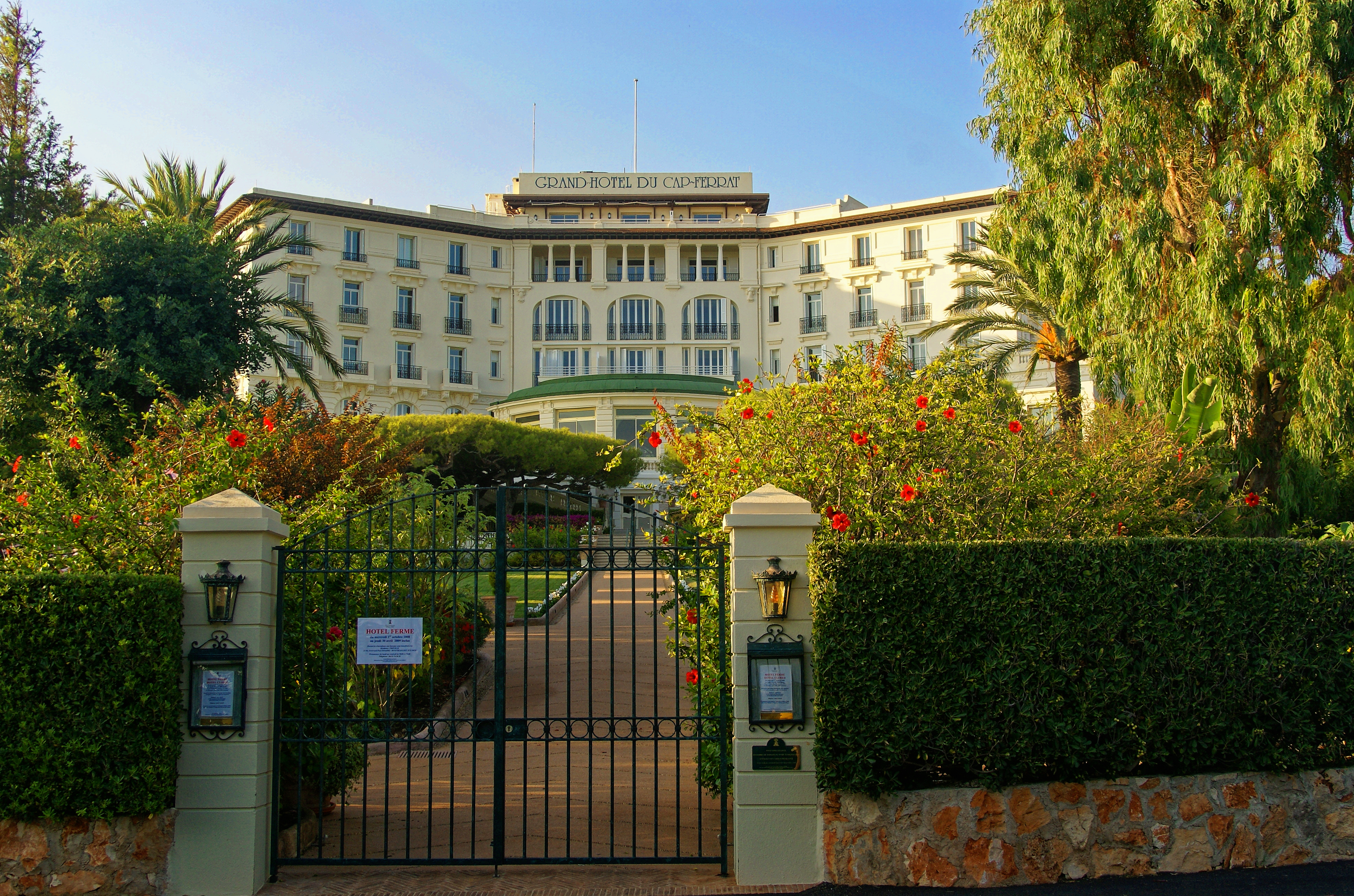
Grand-Hôtel du Cap-Ferrat, 2008

The Grand-Hôtel du Cap-Ferrat, A Four Seasons Hotel is a famous five star luxury resort hotel, in Saint-Jean-Cap-Ferrat on the French Riviera. The hotel obtained the "Palace de France" distinction, granted by the government for its excellence in service in 2011. In 2024, the Michelin Guide awarded its 3 Key distinction. One of the highest-ranking of all the many "palaces" that sprang up all over the French Riviera, the Grand-Hôtel du Cap-Ferrat overlooks the sea from the furthermost tip of the peninsula from which it takes its name.

== History ==
At the turn of the 20th century, Cap-Ferrat was little more than a wilderness of rocks and dense scrubland, vegetation that only changed as real estate began to develop there. At the end of the 19th century, piece by piece, King Leopold II of Belgium purchased the peninsula's only wooded area, and then proceeded to expand his estate by buying up most of the vacant land around.

Shortly before 1900, Leopold sold part of his property to a company founded by a Mr. Péretmère, the son of a coachman from the north who had some savings of his own. He reserved six and a half hectares of the land for the hotel, whose construction began in 1908 with the two wings built at an open angle to each other, then the following year a loggia dining room and the large, central Rotonde were added. By then, the building had its final, distinctive silhouette, remarkably simple for the time. A little later, the Grand-Hôtel was bought by Madame Ferras, a widow and the grandmother of famous violinist Christian Ferras.

=== Twentieth century ===
The First World War broke out shortly after the new owner's arrival and the hotel became a hospital. In 1922, two professional hoteliers, Messrs Henri Dehouve and André Voyenne, acquired a majority shareholding and took over the running of the company. They were to remain in charge for over twenty years, a period marked not only by the Great Depression and the Second World War, but also by a complete revolution in holidaying habits.

Since it first became known in the second half of the 19th century, and up until the 1930s, the French Riviera remained almost exclusively a luxury destination. Most visitors were either wealthy individuals of independent means or royalty from northern countries, in particular England and Russia. They came only in winter and for long visits. Queen Victoria and her court, numerous aristocratic families, Princess Louise, the Duke of Connaught, President Paul Deschanel and many other politicians of the French 3rd Republic, the pianist Marguerite Long, the violinist Jacques Thibaud, and movie stars such as Charles Boyer, Charlie Chaplin and many others were to follow.

Not until 1930 did a few unconventional visitors venture down to the Riviera in summertime, mostly avant-garde writers and artists. They all came in search of solitude, since practically nobody came then, and relished a certain snobbery surrounding their alternative style of travelling. In Cap-Ferrat itself, these new habits arrived purely by chance. During the summer of 1933, the German filmmaker G.W. Pabst persuaded Chaliapin to star in his version of Don Quixote. Since he did not have the funds to film in Spain, the director decided that Cap-Ferrat's landscape would be perfectly suitable. One day, the film crew appeared at the hotel, which was closed at the time but nevertheless offered them improvised accommodation for a few weeks. The actors and film crew were so delighted with their stay in this heavenly location that many of them asked to return the following year for a private visit. Little by little, the summer season emerged, attracting a whole new generation of holidaymakers, younger and more athletic than their predecessors and seeking sun and sea above all else. Since the hotel's rocky coastline made it difficult to reach the sea, a cove was blasted from the rock.

=== Postwar ===
A few weeks after the beginning of the war, the Grand-Hôtel was boarded up and plunged into darkness for six long years. On 5 March 1944, in preparation for an allied landing, the entire peninsula was evacuated and riddled with mines. Local inhabitants were given only a few hours to grab some of their belongings and flee. Thankfully, the hotel and swimming pool survived entirely unscathed by nearby shelling and the explosion that destroyed the lighthouse.

Upon reopening at the end of the war, the procession of the great, rich and famous continued; the European royal houses, lords and barons from England; the great entrepreneurs of finance and industry, glittering literary and artistic celebrities. Other illustrious guests included the novelist Somerset Maugham, Charlie Chaplin, Winston Churchill and Aristotle Onassis. The legendary swimming instructor, Pierre Gruneberg, has given lessons to Picasso, as well as to both Paul McCartney’s and Frank Sinatra’s children in the heated, 33m, saltwater pool.

=== 21st century ===
An extension was built in two phases, while the hotel was closed each year, from October to April 2007 – 2008 and again in 2008–2009, and opened in May 2009. The project was designed by architect Luc Svetchine and comprised 16 rooms, 8 suites with private plunge pools, a 7,500 sq ft (700 m^{2}) spa & fitness center with indoor swimming pool and the creation of two new suites on the garden level of the main building. The grounds are the work of landscape gardener Jean Mus. A new underground car park replaced the old above-ground parking areas.

Four Seasons Hotels and Resorts took over management of the hotel on 8 May 2015 and the name was changed to Grand-Hôtel du Cap-Ferrat, A Four Seasons Hotel.

== Rooms and suites ==
As of 1 May 2009, the Grand Hotel du Cap Ferrat contains 74 rooms (including 24 suites and the Penthouse) and a 5,500 sq ft (510 m^{2}) presidential suite, the Villa Rose-Pierre with its sea-view and pine grove.

== Restaurants ==
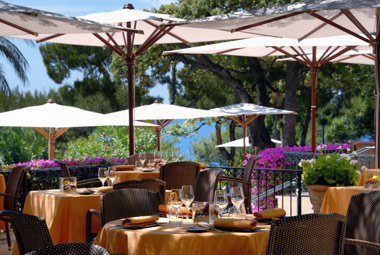
Restaurant at the hotel

The Grand-Hôtel serves food from three locations: at the Michelin 1-star Le Cap Gastronomic Restaurant, at La Véranda on the hotel's terrace overlooking the Mediterranean and shaded by Aleppo pines, or at the Club Dauphin Restaurant next to the pool.

== Vintage wines ==
The Grand-Hotel du Cap-Ferrat maintains a collection of well-known vintage wines:

- 140 vintage bottles of Château d'Yquem dating from 1854 to 2003
- 38 vintage bottles of Château Lafite Rothschild dating from 1799 to 2003

== Music Festival ==
The Grand-Hotel du Cap-Ferrat Music Festival Artistic director : Michael Desjardins

The Festival is an up-to-date version of the tradition of salon music, which dates back to centuries past, and of the jazz clubs and Parisian café-theatres where audiences would rub shoulders with the artists. The Rotonde, designed by Gustave Eiffel, is a comfortable venue with outstanding acoustics. The programme spans every genre of vocal and instrumental music from all eras: opera, classical music, baroque music, film soundtracks, international variety, jazz, traditional music, and first performances of original works of contemporary music.
