= Pierre Gruneberg =

German-born French ski and swimming instructor (1931–2023)

- Born: Peter Grüneberg; 6 March 1931; Cologne, Rhine Province, Prussia, Germany
- Died: 4 June 2023 (aged 92)
- Occupations: Ski instructor Swimming instructor

Pierre Gruneberg (born Peter Grüneberg; 6 March 1931 – 4 June 2023) was a German-born French ski and swimming instructor. He was notably the husband of actress Silvia Monfort.

== Biography ==
Born in Cologne on 6 March 1931, Gruneberg had German Jewish parents. The family fled to France during World War II. Although his father was a lawyer and his mother was a schoolteacher, he followed his passion of sports. He became an instructor at the École du ski français in 1950 and accompanied the French team as a physiotherapist at the 1956 Summer Olympics. He then worked as both a ski and swimming instructor.

In 1966, Gruneberg introduced the concept of evolutionary skiing to France, in which beginners would use short skis. In the summer, he would work as a lifeguard for the Grand-Hôtel du Cap-Ferrat. At the beginning of the 1960s, he met Silvia Monfort, whom he started dating in 1963. However, the couple did not get married until 24 May 1990. Monfort died on 30 March 1991. In 1996, he founded the Association Prix Silvia Monfort.

Pierre Gruneberg died on 4 June 2023, at the age of 92.

== Books ==
- Ski court, ski long en 10 leçons et tout pour skier de A à Z (1972)
- Nager en 10 leçons et tout pour être dans le bain de A à Z (1974)
- La Natation (1978)
