= Les Misérables (1958 film) =

- Directed by: Jean-Paul Le Chanois
- Screenplay by: Michel Audiard; René Barjavel
- Based on: Les Misérables; 1862 novel by Victor Hugo
- Starring: Jean Gabin
- Cinematography: Jacques Natteau
- Edited by: Lieselotte Johl; Emma Le Chanois
- Music by: Georges Van Parys
- Production company: Deutsche Film (DEFA)
- Distributed by: Pathé (France); VEB Progress Film-Vertrieb (East Germany); Continental Distributing (US)
- Release dates: 12 March 1958 (France); 16 January 1959 (East Germany)
- Running time: 217 minutes
- Countries: France; East Germany; Italy
- Language: French
- Box office: 9,968,993 admissions (France)

Les Misérables is a 1958 film adaptation of the 1862 Victor Hugo novel. Written by René Barjavel, the film was directed by Jean-Paul Le Chanois and stars Jean Gabin as Jean Valjean.

== Adaptation ==
The bishop's background is briefly sketched rather than detailed as in the novel. Javert is a young boy, the son of a guard in the Toulon prison, when he sees Valjean as a convict. Fantine's body, instead of being thrown into a public grave unceremoniously after Javert arrested Jean Valjean, was still in her deathbed after Jean Valjean escaped jail, and he pays Sister Simplice to bury her properly. In a flashback to Mr. Thénardier's looting of valuables from the corpses of dead soldiers at the Battle of Waterloo and inadvertent rescue of Baron Pontmercy, he was an opportunistic deserter from within Napoleon's Grande Armée rather than a thief outside the ranks who completely fabricated his military service record after the war to cover up his looting, and Mrs. Thénardier was also present at Waterloo serving as a cantinière. Javert comes to arrest Jean Valjean when he is in the house of Thénardier intending to take Cosette with him. Sister Simplice admits Valjean and Cosette to the convent instead of Father Fauchevent. Thénardier, in disguise, meets Marius and proves to him with the help of newspaper clippings that he is completely mistaken about Valjean's criminal past.

== Cast ==
- Jean Gabin as Jean Valjean/Champmathieu
- Bernard Blier as Javert (father and son)
- Danièle Delorme as Fantine
- Bourvil as Thénardier
- Elfriede Florin as La Thénardier
- Giani Esposito as Marius Pontmercy
- Béatrice Altariba as Cosette
  - Martine Havet as young Cosette
- Silvia Monfort as Éponine
  - Mireille Daix as young Éponine
- Jimmy Urbain as Gavroche
- Serge Reggiani as Enjolras
- Fernand Ledoux as Monseigneur Myriel
- Isabelle Lobbé as Azelma
- Jean d'Yd as Mabeuf
- Jean Murat as Colonel Georges Pontmercy
- Lucien Baroux as Monsieur Gillenormand
- Suzanne Nivette as Mademoiselle Gillenormand
- Jacques Harden as Courfeyrac
- Marc Eyraud as Grantaire
- Werner Dissel as Brevet
- Beyert as Bahorel
- Hans-Ulrich Laufer as Combeferre
- Gérard Darrieu as Feuilly
- Pierre Tabard as Prouvaire
- Henri Guégan as Laigle
- Julienne Paroli as Madame Magloire
- Laure Paillette as Toussaint
- Madeleine Barbulée as Soeur Simplice
- Christian Fourcade as Petit Gervais
- Bernard Musson as Bamatabois
- René Fleur as The cardinal
- Ardisson as A gendarme
- Jean Ozenne as The prefect of Montreuil
- Gerhard Bienert as The president of the court
- Harry Hindemith as Un bagnard

== Production ==
Called "the most memorable film version", it was filmed in East Germany and was overtly political. Of the many film adaptations of the novel, this has been called "the one most popular with audiences in postwar France". One noteworthy plot change was made to accommodate the fact that the actors playing the roles of Valjean and Javert were far apart in age, rather than near contemporaries as in the novel. Instead of Javert recognizing Valjean as a convict he had often guarded years earlier, he remembers how, when he was just a boy, his prison guard father had pointed out this man as "the worst kind of prisoner, who tried to escape four times".

== Release ==
The movie was a massive hit in France, the second most popular of 1958.

The New York Times described it as one of the first French "blockbusters" that appeared in response to such lengthy feature films as Around the World in 80 Days and The Ten Commandments. It said it was "a ponderous four-hour retelling of Victor Hugo's oft-filmed epic. ... Not a page is skipped ... Too literary, it has the saving grace of Jean Gabin's truly heroic depiction of Jean Valjean plus some stirring scenes on the barricades." It was a "quintessential Gabin role ... that of a loner, an outsider, usually a member of the lower orders who may flirt with love and happiness but knows they are not for him".

The film did not premiere in New York until July 1989, when it ran to coincide with the celebration of the bicentennial of the French Revolution.

== See also ==
- Adaptations of Les Misérables
