= Lothar Blumhagen =

German actor (1927–2023)

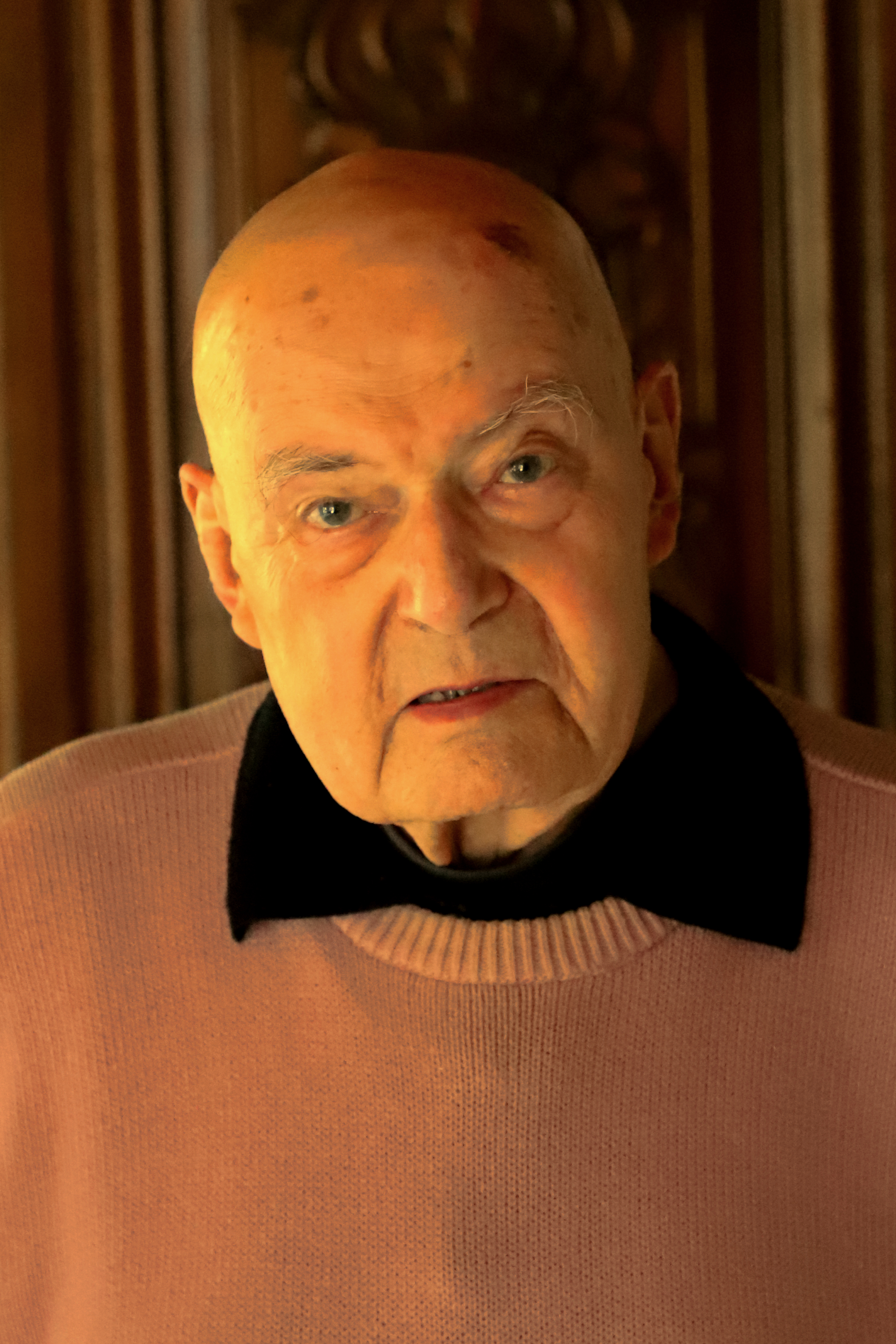
- Blumhagen in 2021
- Born: 16 July 1927; Leipzig, Saxony, Germany
- Died: 10 January 2023 (aged 95); Berlin, Germany
- Occupations: Actor; voice actor
- Organizations: DEFA
- Awards: Berliner Staatsschauspieler

Lothar Blumhagen (16 July 1927 – 10 January 2023) was a German actor, especially known as a voice actor. He began as a stage actor, in ensembles in East Berlin and West Berlin. He was often the German voice of British gentleman characters, such as Roger Moore's, beginning in 1971 with Brett Sinclair in the television series The Persuaders!. He voiced roles by Christopher Plummer from Dragnet in 1987 to Knives Out in 2020.

== Biography ==
Born in Leipzig, he made his stage debut there in 1947. He was a stage actor in Leipzig, Halle and Berlin, where he was a member of the ensemble of the Deutsches Theater Berlin from 1954 to 1956. He made his debut in film in the 1954 Hexen, and played more roles for the DEFA. In 1956, he moved to West Berlin, becoming a member of the ensembles of the Schillertheater and the Schlossparktheater. He was awarded the title Berliner Staatsschauspieler in 1970. He rarely played in film and television after his DEFA work, but participated in the documentary Zeugin der Zeit – Käthe Kollwitz in 1985 and in the West–East co-production Boundaries of Time: Caspar David Friedrich in 1986.

Blumhagen became known as a voice actor. He became one of the leading voice actors in Germany, with roles in more than 600 films. His voice was described as dark, raspy and unmistakable ("dunkles, raues Timbre war unverkennbar") and was often chosen to represent British gentleman. He was the German voice for Christopher Plummer, in roles from Reverend Jonathan Whirley in Dragnet in 1987, Arthur Case in Inside Man in 2006, to Harlan Thrombey in the comedy Knives Out in 2020. He was often the German voice of Roger Moore, in roles such as Lord Brett Sinclair, the German version (Die 2) of the action-comedy series The Persuaders!. He was the voice of Jonathan Higgins, played by John Hillerman, in the crime series Magnum, P.I. He became the voice of Christopher Lee (The Skull), Alan Rickman, Erland Josephson, and of Andreas Katsulas as Ambassador G'Kar in Babylon 5. In the 1976 Die Unbestechlichen, the German version of All the President's Men, he was the voice of Deep Throat, a leading role characterised exclusively by his voice.

Blumhagen died in a hospital in Berlin on 10 January 2023, aged 95.

== Films ==
Films with Blumhagen include:

- 1954: Hexen
- 1955: Sommerliebe
- 1958: Die Erbin
- 1967: Nathan the Wise (television film)
- 1968: Unwiederbringlich (television film)
- 1984: Die Schwärmer
- 1985: Zeugin der Zeit – Käthe Kollwitz
- 1986: Boundaries of Time: Caspar David Friedrich

== Voice roles ==
Blumhagen's voice roles include:

Christopher Lee

- 1965: The Skull as Sir Matthew Phillips
- 1969: The Oblong Box as Dr. J. Neuhart
- 1978: Der Herr der Karawane as Sardar Khan
- 1989: La Révolution française as Henker von Paris
- 1990: Gremlins 2: The New Batch as Dr. Catheter

Roger Moore

- 1971: Die Zwei
- 1980: Sunday Lovers (Vier Asse hauen auf die Pauke) as Harry Lindon
- 1981: The Cannonball Run (Auf dem Highway ist die Hölle los as Seymour Goldfarb, Jr.
- 1989: The Man Who Haunted Himself (Ein Mann jagt sich selbst as Harold Pelham
- 1990: Bullseye! as Garald Bradley-Smith / Sir John Bevistock
- 1994: The Man Who Wouldn't Die (Der Mann, der niemals starb as Thomas Grace/ Inspector Fulbright
- 2011: A Princess for Christmas (Eine Prinzessin zu Weihnachten as Edward Duke of Castlebury

Christopher Plummer

- 1987: Dragnet as Reverend Jonathan Whirley
- 1996: Verschwörung der Angst as Joseph Wakeman
- 2001: A Beautiful Mind as Dr. Rosen
- 2004: Alexander as Aristoteles
- 2005: Must Love Dogs as Bill
- 2006: Inside Man as Arthur Case
