= Walfriede Schmitt =

German actress (born 1943)

- Born: March 26, 1943 (age 82); Berlin, Germany
- Occupation: Actor

Walfriede Schmitt (March 26, 1943 in Berlin) is a German actress. She is the daughter of the actress Elfriede Florin.

Schmitt is best known in Germany for starring in the television series Für alle Fälle Stefanie.

She played 'Philipp's mother' in the 1989 film Coming Out. Late in 1989, she became the final president of the Union of Art, before it merged into its West German equivalent.

Trade union offices
Preceded by Herbert Bischoff	President of the Union of Art; 1989–1990	Succeeded by Union dissolved
