= Hortense Raky =

German-born Austrian stage actress

- Born: August 27, 1918; Berlin, German Empire
- Died: September 25, 2006 (aged 88); Vienna, Austria
- Occupation: Actress
- Years active: 1936-1974 (film & TV)

Hortense Raky (August 27, 1918 - September 25, 2006) was a German-born Austrian stage actress. She also starred in several films including Willi Forst's Court Theatre in 1936. Partly Jewish, she fled from Austria after the Anschluss of 1938 and settled in Switzerland. She returned to Vienna after the Second World War, but was at one point blacklisted due to her links with the Communist Eastern Bloc. At one point she appeared on stage in East Berlin during this era.

She was married to the actor Karl Paryla in 1939. They had two children who also became actors.

== Selected filmography ==
- Court Theatre (1936)
- Women's Paradise (1936)
- Roxy and the Wonderteam (1938)
- Gasparone (1956)

== Bibliography ==
- Robert Dassanowsky. World Film Locations: Vienna. Intellect Books, 2012.
- Oliver Rathkolb. The Paradoxical Republic: Austria 1945–2005. Berghahn Books, 2010.
