= La donnaccia =

- Directed by: Silvio Siano
- Cinematography: Domenico Paolercio
- Music by: Franco Langella
- Release date: 1965
- Country: Italy
- Language: Italian

La donnaccia ("The Whore") is a 1965 Italian drama film directed by Silvio Siano.

== Synopsis ==
Mariarosa Apicella, a beautiful prostitute, is sent back to her hometown in the South with a deportation order. Her return causes quite a commotion: the local peasants start socializing with her, and eventually, despite the disapproval of the community, one of them decides to marry her.

== Cast ==
- Dominique Boschero as Mariarosa
- Georges Rivière
- Aldo Bufi Landi
- Laura De Marchi
- Nello Ascoli
- Gianni Dei
- Giacomo Furia
- Renato Mambor
- Lucile Saint-Simon
- Piero Vida
