= 1960 in French television =

This is a list of French television related events from 1960.

== Events ==
- 29 March – France wins the 5th Eurovision Song Contest in London, United Kingdom. The winning song is "Tom Pillibi" performed by Jacqueline Boyer.

== Debuts ==
- 20 October – La Tête et les Jambes (1960–1978)

== Television shows ==
=== 1940s ===
- Le Jour du Seigneur (1949–present)

=== 1950s ===
- Art et magie de la cuisine
- Cinq colonnes à la une
- Discorama
- Le Club du jeudi (1950–1961)
- Magazine féminin (1952–1970)
- Lectures pour tous (1953–1968)
- La Piste aux étoiles (1956–1978)
- Voyage sans passeport (1957–1969)

== Ending this year ==
- A la découverte des Français
- La Boîte à sel (1955–1960)

== Births ==
- 16 April – Tex, TV presenter

== See also ==
- 1960 in France
- List of French films of 1960
