= The Case of Doctor Laurent =

1957 film

- Directed by: Jean-Paul Le Chanois
- Written by: Jean-Paul Le Chanois; René Barjavel
- Produced by: Ignace Morgenstern
- Starring: Jean Gabin; Nicole Courcel; Silvia Monfort
- Cinematography: Henri Alekan
- Edited by: Emma Le Chanois
- Music by: Joseph Kosma
- Production companies: Cocinor; Cocinex; Sédif Productions
- Distributed by: Cocinor
- Release date: 3 April 1957
- Running time: 114 minutes
- Country: France
- Language: French

The Case of Doctor Laurent (French: Le cas du Docteur Laurent) is a 1957 French drama film directed by Jean-Paul Le Chanois and starring Jean Gabin, Nicole Courcel and Silvia Monfort. Upon release in the United States, The film was condemned by the Catholic Church in the Advocate a publication of the Archdiocese of Newark.

It was made at the Photosonor Studios in Courbevoie on the outskirts of Paris with location shooting taking place around Saint-Martin-Vésubie and Venanson in the French Alps. The film's sets were designed by the art director Serge Piménoff.

== Cast ==
- Jean Gabin as Le docteur J. Laurent
- Nicole Courcel as Francine
- Silvia Monfort as Catherine Loubet
- Henri Arius as Le docteur A. Bastid
- Daxely as M. Simonet, le boulanger
- Lucien Callamand as M. Bertrand - le directeur de l'école
- Josselin as M. Roux
- Mag-Avril as Céline
- Marthe Marty as La mère de Franchine
- Germaine de France as Mme Vanolli
- Raymone as La mère Loubet
- Orane Demazis as La veuve Escalin
- Yvonne Gamy as La sage-femme traditionnaliste
- Henri-Jacques Huet as Antonin Escallin
- Viviane Méry as Une habitante
- Riri Berty as Mme Simonet, la boulangère
- Paul Bonifas as Guillaumin
- Jean Panisse as L'homme au poulain
- Antoine Balpêtré as Docteur René Vanolli
- Roger Karl as Docteur Guillot
- Robert Moor as Un docteur
- Michel Barbey as André Loubet
- Georges Lannes as Docteur Ripert

== Bibliography ==
- Harriss, Joseph. Jean Gabin: The Actor Who Was France. McFarland, 2018.
