= Karl Paryla =

Austrian theater actor and director

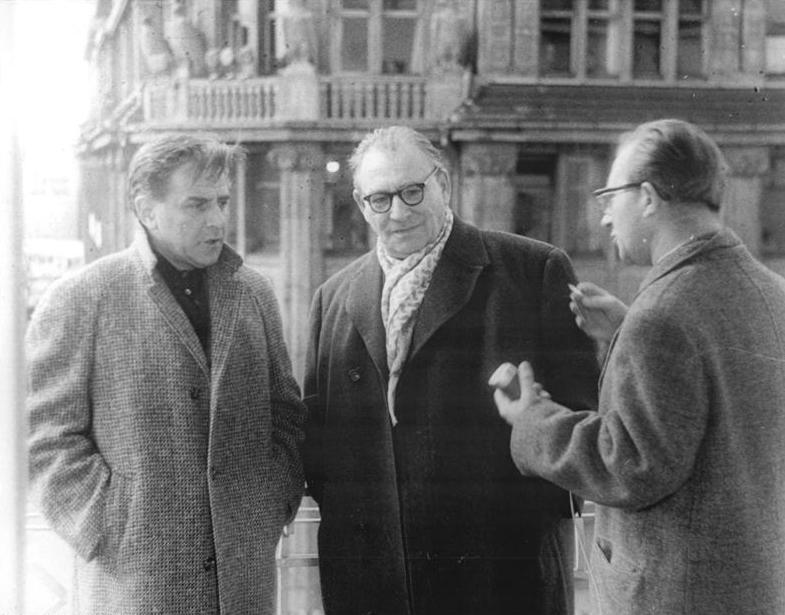
- Left to right: Karl Paryla, Wolfgang Heinz, ADN interviewer
- Born: 1905
- Died: 1996 (aged 90–91)

Karl Paryla (1905–1996) was an Austrian theater actor and director, and later a film maker as well. A lifelong, dedicated communist, his career in the Austrian theater was first interrupted by the Second World War, and then strained by Cold War politics. In the 1950s he began working in East Germany, where he performed as an actor and directed plays and films. An actor trained in the school of Constantin Stanislavski, he is praised for the realism he brought to his performances especially in Johann Nestroy's plays and for his ability to organize large ensembles dynamically on the stage. He is remembered also for his work ethic and his fervent belief in the emancipatory power of the theater.

== Biography ==
Paryla was born to working-class parents; his father was an instrument maker, and a lower officer and civil servant in the administration of Austria-Hungary. Born Catholic, he dropped his religious affiliation in 1922. He trained at the University of Music and Performing Arts, Vienna, and began a career as an actor with the Raimund Theater in Vienna (some of his siblings, including Emil Stöhr, also had theatrical careers) in 1924 and by 1926 was working in theaters in Germany, where he also became involved with communist workers' organizations. He was fired in Darmstadt in 1933 for political reasons and fled to Vienna, where he found work with the Theater in der Josefstadt. After the Anschluss he emigrated to Switzerland.

=== During World War II ===
In Zurich, he contributed to the reputation of the Schauspielhaus Zürich as an anti-fascist exile theater, performing in original productions and stagings of classical plays, and he played a central part in the development of realistic drama based on the work of Constantin Stanislavski. He had over 90 roles at the Schauspielhaus, performing in classical tragedy (the titular character in Oedipus Rex) and comedy (Orgon in Tartuffe). He worked with Bertolt Brecht and played the role of Schweizerkas in the first performance of Brecht's Mother Courage and Her Children. After World War II ended he was one of the first actors to return to Vienna, in December 1945.

=== After World War II ===
With Wolfgang Heinz and Emil Stöhr, Paryla was a founding member and actor of the "Neue Theater in der Scala", a "workers' theatre", which was financially supported by the Communist Party of Austria. The theater aimed to be a working man's ensemble with a focus on the work of Austrian dramatist Johann Nestroy, on political drama, and on comedy, an unfavorable mix during the Cold War. Paryla worked at Scala Wien from 1948 to its closing in 1956, at which point he moved his family to East Berlin.

While Vienna was still divided between the West and the Soviet Union, i.e. from 1945 to 1955, he also worked in cinema at the Rosenhügel Filmstudios. When the Soviets left Austria in 1955, he was blacklisted with many others who had worked for Rosenhügel. In 1952 already he had been prevented by American pressure from participating in the Salzburg Festival, where he was an annual regular; Paryla was supposed to have performed in Jedermann. Like many blacklisted actors and directors, he went to work in East Germany and began making movies for DEFA; his first was Mich dürstet, a film based on the Spanish Civil War. At the same time he continued to perform, in Berlin and Munich, with notable roles including Touchstone (As You Like It) and Mephistopheles (Faust), and above all as a Netroy actor. In 1966, he performed in Cologne in an adaptation of La Celestina. He died on 14 July 1996 in his native city, Vienna.

== Legacy ==
Paryla was praised for his realism in acting, especially in Johann Nestroy's plays, and as a director for his dynamic mise-en-scene. Paryla is credited as one of the actors that made the Schauspielhaus Zürich "the best theatre in Europe". He was one of the contributors to the "Nestroy Renaissance in Vienna"; under German occupation Nestroy was deemed "folkish" and German enough to be allowed on stage, and after the war Paryla was one of the actors/directors who reclaimed Nestroy—this time, with a communist agenda (according to one critic), with Paryla stressing realism: "In our theater we play Nestroy in unadulterated form, that is forcefully; that also means that we do not permit false sentimentality or false compromise. We consider the production of each Nestroy comedy as the most honorable and most natural duty. And that is why we play Nestroy." He is praised as lending a political realism to Nestrovian characters unparalleled in the 1950s.

Paryla's relationship with Vienna was strained because of politics; official recognition from the city would not come until the 1980s and 90s.

== Personal life ==
He was married to the German-born stage and film actress Hortense Raky from 1939 until his death.

== Filmography ==
- Last Love (1935)
- … nur ein Komödiant (1935)
- Court Theatre (1936)
- Fräulein Lilli (1936)
- Sein letztes Modell (1937)
- The Priest from Kirchfeld (1937)
- Nanon (1938)
- The Angel with the Trumpet (1948)
- Semmelweis – Retter der Mütter (1950)
- Die Unbesiegbaren (1953)
- Der Komödiant von Wien (also directed and adapted, 1954)
- Mich dürstet (directed, 1956)
- Gasparone (directed and wrote screenplay, 1956)
- Zu viele Köche (TV show, 1961)
- Der Traum des Hauptmann Loy (1961)
- Die inneren Stimmen (TV, 1961)
- Eine Nacht in Venedig (TV, 1962)
- Hin und her (1963)
- Der Bauer als Millionär (TV, 1963)
- The Doctor's Dilemma (TV, 1963)
- Kean (TV, 1963)
- Flüchtlingsgespräche (TV, 1964)
- Professor Bernhardi (TV, 1964)
- The Blue Danube (TV, 1965)
- The Merchant of Venice (TV, 1968)
- Libussa (TV, 1972)
- As You Like It (TV, 1973)
- Totstellen (TV, 1975)
- Alpensaga, Teil 3 – Das große Fest (TV, 1977)
- Die grüne Seite (TV, 1981)
- Der Talisman (TV, 1987)
- Les volets verts (TV series L'heure Simenon, 1988)
- La mort d'Auguste (TV series L'heure Simenon, 1988)
- Singen kann der Mensch auf unzählige Arten (TV, 1989)
