= Maurice Clavel =

French writer, journalist, and philosopher (1920-1979)

Maurice Clavel (French: [klavɛl]; 10 November 1920 – 23 April 1979) was a French writer, journalist, and philosopher.

== Early life ==
Maurice Clavel was born on 10 November 1920 in Frontignan, Hérault to a family headed by a father who was a pharmacist. This conservative milieu of small shopkeepers in Languedoc led him to be an activist in the French Popular Party (FPP) in his hometown of Frontignan.

As a brilliant pupil, he got into the prestigious École Normale Supérieure in the Rue d'Ulm in Paris. There he became acquainted with Trotskyist Jean-Toussaint Desanti and Maurrassian Pierre Boutang. The latter, having been appointed in the Secretariat of Public Instruction, invited him to serve by his side under Marshal Philippe Pétain. Having just gotten his certificate of morale and sociology in Montpellier, Maurice Clavel accepted the offer but was soon disillusioned. While preparing a thesis on Immanuel Kant, he joined the Résistance (1942). As head of the French Forces of the Interior of Eure-et-Loir, he took part in the liberation of Chartres where he greeted General Charles de Gaulle on the cathedral's forecourt.

At the Libération, he denounced the blind depuration and tried to save the heads of Robert Brasillach and Drieu La Rochelle. That did not prevent him from being a fervent activist in the Rally of the French People (RPF) whose acerbic criticism of communism got him to be accused by the French Communist Party (PCF) of being "Goebbels' voice". He then founded with Henri d'Astier de La Vigerie and André Figueras a newspaper called L'Essor. Meanwhile, he wrote plays directed by Jean Vilar like Les Incendiaires (The Incendiaries) in 1947 or La Terrasse de midi (The Noon Terrace) in 1949. But those failed, and as he was torn apart after breaking his relationship with the actor Silvia Monfort, Clavel accepted a professor tenure in the Carnot high school in Dijon.

Barely liked by his superiors, he soon got back to theatrical works when, in 1951, Jean Vilar appointed him as secretary-general of the Théâtre National Populaire. But his new play Malsameda (1954) as well as his first novel Une fille pour l'été (A Girl for the Summer, 1955) turned out to be failures too.

== Journalist ==
=== From 1955 to 1965 ===
In 1955, Clavel started his career as a journalist writing in Combat. Protesting, among other things, against the invasion of Hungary by Soviet tanks in 1956, and the use of torture in Algeria, he got involved with left-wing Gaullists in the Democratic Union of Labour in 1959. Meanwhile, he went back to teaching as a philosophy professor in Camille Sée and Buffon High School in Paris, from 1960 to 1963. With Emmanuel Berl, he presented a daily radio programme Qui êtes-vous ? (Who are you?). But after the refusal by managers of the radio station to grant Jean Daniel a right of reply about Algeria, he resigned. The following year, after publishing Le Temps de Chartres (The Times of Chartres), he ceased his regular contribution to Combat. However, he kept supporting General De Gaulle's position on Algeria, who entrusted him to engage in a dialogue with Messali Hadj.

But the year 1965 marked a fracture in his political and philosophical evolution. First, he regained faith in the Catholic religion, a conversion triggered by his reading of a book by Paul Cochois about Pierre de Bérulle, the founder of the Oratorians congregation. Later, the Ben Barka affair in October of the same year led him to distance himself from De Gaulle. In an op-ed published in Le Monde on 15 June 1966, he sanctioned his breaking with the General while announcing to the press his availability to follow the Ben Barka trial as a judicial commentator. Thus he was contacted by Hector de Galard to follow the affair for Le Nouvel Observateur, starting in September 1966.

=== After 1965 ===
Clavel started his contribution to Le Nouvel Observateur with virulent articles against the power, denouncing among others "the sharks and the gudgeons" (19 October 1966). The following year he contributed to the newspaper's TV column while he continued writing in Combat, and publishing novels such as La Pourpre de Judée (The Crimson of Judea) or Les Délices du genre humain (The Delights of Mankind, 1967).

May 1968 radicalised his political involvement. Perceiving the events of May as a "uprise of life" from a youth weary of consumption society, he found the revolutionary unrest similar to a party and even wished to lead the demonstrators on 13 May to assault the Élysée Palace. Within Le Nouvel Observateur, he supported the managers in the name of the need for responsible management, the loneliness of columnists, and individual responsibility. But outside he went to serve the most radical elements of the contestation leading him to leave his tenure as a philosophy professor at Buffon High School. He won the Prix Médicis for Le Tiers des étioles in 1972.

Clavel died on 23 April 1979 in Asquins, Yonne.
