= The Accident (film) =

- Film poster
- French: L'accidents
- Directed by: Edmond T. Gréville
- Written by: Frédéric Dard (novel); Edmond T. Gréville
- Produced by: José Bénazéraf
- Starring: Georges Rivière; Magali Noël; Danik Patisson
- Cinematography: Jean Badal
- Edited by: Jean Ravel
- Production companies: Films Univers; Félix Films
- Distributed by: Twentieth Century Fox (France)
- Release date: 7 August 1963
- Running time: 91 minutes
- Country: France
- Language: French

The Accident (French: L'accident) is a 1963 French crime drama film directed by Edmond T. Gréville and starring Georges Rivière, Magali Noël and Danik Patisson.

The film's sets were designed by the art director Sydney Bettex.

== Cast ==
- Georges Rivière as Julien
- Magali Noël as Andréa
- Danik Patisson as Françoise Cassel
- Roland Lesaffre as The Goualec
- Jean Combal as police inspector
