= Court Theatre (film) =

1936 Austrian drama film

- Directed by: Willi Forst
- Written by: Willi Forst; Jochen Huth
- Produced by: Willi Forst
- Starring: Werner Krauss; Carl Esmond; Hortense Raky
- Cinematography: Theodore J. Pahle
- Edited by: Hans Wolff
- Music by: Peter Kreuder
- Production company: Willy Forst-Filmproduktion
- Distributed by: Tobis Film (Germany)
- Release date: 13 November 1936
- Running time: 102 minutes
- Country: Austria
- Language: German

Court Theatre (German: Burgtheater) is a 1936 Austrian drama film directed by Willi Forst and starring Werner Krauss, Carl Esmond and Hortense Raky.

Much of the film was shot on location in the Burgtheater in Vienna. The Sievering Studios were also used for the production. The film's sets were designed by the art directors Kurt Herlth, Werner Schlichting and Emil Stepanek.

== Main cast ==
- Werner Krauss as Friedrich Mitterer
- Carl Esmond as Josef Rainer
- Hortense Raky as Leni Schindler
- Olga Chekhova as Baroness Seebach
- Hans Moser as Souffleur Sedlmayer
- Karl Günther as Baron Seebach
- Karl Skraup as Schindler
- Josefine Dora as Frau Schindler
- Franz Herterich as Direktor des Burgtheaters
- Erik Frey as Schauspieler des Burgtheaters
- O. W. Fischer as Schauspieler des Burgtheaters
- Maria Holst as Fritzi
- Camilla Gerzhofer as Frau von S. Gesellschaftsdame
- Karl Paryla as Erster junger Schauspieler
- Fred Steinbacher as Zweiter junger Schauspieler
- Marietta Weber as Erste Schauspielerin
- Kurt von Lessen as Der Kritiker
- Georg Schmieter as Opernsänger
- Babette Devrient as Fürstin
- Rudolf Teubler as Majordomus
- Irma Eckert as Zofe
- Otto Hartmann as Vorsprechender Schauspieler
- Maria Lehdin as Gretchen
- Marie Hilde as Lintschi
- August Keilholz as Diener
- Ady Berber as Heurigensänger

== Bibliography ==
- Robert Dassanowsky. Austrian Cinema: A History. McFarland, 2005.
