= Dr. Semmelweis =

1950 film

- Directed by: Georg C. Klaren
- Starring: Karl Paryla
- Release date: 1950
- Country: East Germany
- Language: German

Dr. Semmelweis (German: Semmelweis – Retter der Mütter) is an East German film. It was released in 1950.
