= Elfriede Florin =

German actress (1912–2006)

- Born: 26 March 1912; Düsseldorf, Germany
- Died: 7 March 2006 (aged 93); Berlin, Germany
- Occupation: Actress
- Children: Walfriede Schmitt

Elfriede Florin (26 March 1912 – 7 March 2006) was a German actress who was popular in the 1950s and 1960s, and is best known for featuring in the 1958 film Les Misérables.

== Filmography ==
Year	Title	Role	Notes
1954	Gefährliche Fracht	Krankenschwester	
1954	Leuchtfeuer	Fischerin	
1955	Sommerliebe	Eva Lange	
1956	Mich dürstet	Barbara	
1956	Les Aventures de Till L'Espiègle	Soetkin	
1957	Schlösser und Katen		
1957	Zwei Mütter	Schwester Paula	
1958	Les Misérables	La Thenardier	
1958	Das Stacheltier - Der junge Engländer	Klatschbase	
1960	Der Moorhund	Mutter Schultz	
1962	Tanz am Sonnabend	Suse Züllich	
1963	Frau Holle	Witwe	
1965	Die besten Jahre	Dozentin	
