= Laura De Marchi =

Italian actress (born 1936)

Laura De Marchi (born 25 July 1936) is an Italian actress.

== Selected filmography ==
Film
Year	Title	Role	Notes
1965	La donnaccia		
1967	China is Near	Clotilde	
1968	Il giorno della civetta	Daughter of Don Mariano	
1970	Open Letter to an Evening Daily	Dublino's wife	
1972	The Assassin of Rome	Servant	
1974	Morel's Invention	Guest at the Villa	
1974	Flavia the Heretic	Tarantula Cult Woman	
1975	Scandal in the Family	Vincenza	
1977	Ready for Anything	Marco's Wife	
1977	I Am Afraid	Luisa Meroni	
1981	The Beyond	Mary-Ann	
1983	Nostalghia	Chambermaid	
