= Sommerliebe =

1955 film

- Directed by: Franz Barrenstein
- Release date: 1955
- Country: East Germany
- Language: German

Sommerliebe is an East German film. It was released in 1955, and sold more than 3,700,000 tickets.

== Cast ==
- Maria Buschhoff as Milli
- Lothar Blumhagen as Robby
- Gisela May as Lotte
- Christina Huth as Martha
- Charlotte Wahl as Ilse
- Werner Peters as Grothe
- Hans Wehrl as Ernst Lange
- Elfriede Florin as Eva Lange
- Herbert Richter as Anton Linse
- Maria Besendahl as Klara Linse
