= Ravishing =

1960 film

- Directed by: Robert Lamoureux
- Written by: Robert Lamoureux
- Produced by: Charles Borderie; Raymond Borderie; Henri Diamant-Berger; Salvatore Persichetti
- Starring: Robert Lamoureux; Sylva Koscina; Philippe Noiret
- Cinematography: Robert Lefebvre
- Edited by: Christian Gaudin
- Music by: Henri Bourtayre; Paul Durand
- Production companies: CICC; Fono Roma; Le Film d'Art; Panorama Films
- Distributed by: Prodis
- Release date: 14 December 1960
- Running time: 95 minutes
- Countries: France; Italy
- Language: French

Ravishing (French: Ravissante) is a 1960 French-Italian comedy film directed by Robert Lamoureux and starring Lamoureux, Sylva Koscina and Philippe Noiret.

It was shot at the Epinay Studios in Paris. The film's sets were designed by the art director Rino Mondellini.

== Cast ==
- Robert Lamoureux as Thierry
- Sylva Koscina as Evelyne Cotteret
- Philippe Noiret as Maurice
- Lucile Saint-Simon as Françoise
- Jacques Dacqmine as Marc Cotteret
- Raoul Marco as L'aubergiste
- Dominique Page as Hélène
- Donatella Mauro as L'hôtesse italienne
- Roger Crouzet as Le steward
- Nando Bruno as Official at Rome Airport
- Lucien Frégis as Le garagiste
- Brigitte Juslin as Louise
- Eddie Constantine as Eddie
- Robert Rollis as Homme qui renseigne Thierry

== Bibliography ==
- Oscherwitz, Dayna & Higgins, MaryEllen . The A to Z of French Cinema. Scarecrow Press, 2009.
