= Jean-Paul Le Chanois =

French film director

- Born: 25 October 1909; Paris, France
- Died: 8 July 1985 (aged 75); Paris, France
- Occupations: Film director Screenwriter; Actor
- Years active: 1932–1976

Jean-Paul Étienne Dreyfus, better known as Jean-Paul Le Chanois (French pronunciation: [ʒɑ̃ pɔl lə ʃanwa]; 25 October 1909 – 8 July 1985), was a French film director, screenwriter and actor. His film ...Sans laisser d'adresse won the Golden Bear (Comedies) award at the 1st Berlin International Film Festival.

== Selected filmography ==
- España (1936)
- The Time of the Cherries (1938)
- Those of the Sky (1941)
- Eight Men in a Castle (1942)
- Picpus (1943)
- Girl with Grey Eyes (1945)
- Her Final Role (1946)
- Messieurs Ludovic (1946)
- Dilemma of Two Angels (1948)
- The Eleven O'Clock Woman (1948)
- The Idol (1948)
- Passion for Life (1949)
- Without Leaving an Address (1951)
- Matrimonial Agency (1952)
- Twelve Hours of Happiness (1952)
- The House on the Dune (1952)
- Alarm in Morocco (1953)
- Papa, maman, la bonne et moi (1954)
- Magic Village (1955)
- The Fugitives (1955)
- Papa, maman, ma femme et moi (1955)
- The Case of Doctor Laurent (1957)
- Les Misérables (1958)
- Mandrin (1962)
- Monsieur (1964)
- The Gardener of Argenteuil (1966)
