= Dominique Bailly =

French politician (born 1960)

Senator, French Senate
- In office 1 October 2011 – 15 July 2017
- Constituency: Nord

Mayor of Orchies
- In office 30 October 2005 – 15 July 2018

Personal details
- Born: 2 January 1960 (age 66) Lens, Pas-de-Calais
- Party: Socialist
- Occupation: Finance Department Official

Dominique Bailly (born 2 January 1960) is a member of the Senate of France. He was first elected in 2011, and represents the Nord department. A Finance Department Official by profession, he serves as a member of the Socialist Party.

From 2005 to 2018, he was the mayor of Orchies. He works as a lobbyist after retiring from the senate.
