= Lucile Saint-Simon =

French actress (1932–2026)

- Born: 19 October 1932; Corbeil-Essonnes, France
- Died: 23 May 2026 (aged 93); Ibiza, Spain
- Years active: 1953–1965
- Spouse(s): Jacques Verlier (1953–?; divorced, 1 child); Georges Rivière
- Children: Karina Verlier

Lucile Saint-Simon (19 October 1932 – 23 May 2026) was a French actress from the Paris suburb of Corbeil-Essonnes. She appeared in such feature films as Les Bonnes Femmes (1960), The Hands of Orlac (1962), La donnaccia (Italian, 1965). In 2011, the LA Times called her a "forgotten actress".

Simon died on 23 May 2026, at the age of 93. Her husband, actor Georges Riviere, predeceased her.

== Filmography ==
Year	Title	Role	Notes
1953	Dortoir des grandes	Les élèves	
1960	Les Bonnes Femmes	Rita	
1960	Tendre et violente Elisabeth	Élisabeth	
1960	Ravishing	Françoise	
1960	The Hands of Orlac	Louise Cochrane Orlac	
1961	Arrêtez les tambours	Catherine Leproux	
1961	No dispares contra mí	Lucile	
1962	Le dernier quart d'heure	Michèle	
1962	Le roi des montagnes	Mary-Ann	
1963	The Virgin of Nuremberg	Hilde	
1963	Le commissaire mène l'enquête	Christine	(segment "Pour qui sonne le ...")
1965	La donnaccia		(final film role)
