= Les Bonnes Femmes =

1960 film by Claude Chabrol

- Film poster
- Directed by: Claude Chabrol
- Written by: Claude Chabrol; Paul Gégauff
- Produced by: Raymond Hakim; Robert Hakim
- Starring: Bernadette Lafont; Clotilde Joano; Stéphane Audran; Lucile Saint-Simon
- Cinematography: Henri Decaë
- Edited by: Gisèle Chézeau; Jacques Gaillard
- Music by: Pierre Jansen; Paul Misraki
- Distributed by: Pathé
- Release date: 1960
- Running time: 100 minutes
- Country: France
- Language: French

Les Bonnes Femmes is a 1960 French nouvelle vague comedy drama film directed by Claude Chabrol. It follows four young Parisian women and their very different encounters with men. Though unsuccessful upon its initial release in France, it was subject to critical reevaluation, and is now regarded as one of the best of Chabrol's early films.

== Plot ==
The film tells the story of four young Parisian women and their domestic and romantic encounters. Several of them work as saleswomen in an appliance store, one moonlights as an entertainer, and all are pursued by Parisian men both good and bad. Jane is pursued by men and portrayed as being more ditzy and happy go lucky. Ginette works during the night as an entertainer and reveals that she hates her day job with the other girls. Rita has a fiancé, but during dinner with his parents, one sees that he thinks very little of her as an intellectual and a person. Jacqueline is pursued through the film by a mysterious man on a motorcycle, and even turns down other men after developing feelings for him despite never meeting. However, after the two finally meet and proclaim their love for each other, the man murders Jacqueline in the forest and then flees on his motorcycle.

== Cast ==
- Bernadette Lafont — Jane
- Clotilde Joano — Jacqueline
- Stéphane Audran — Ginette
- Lucile Saint-Simon — Rita
- Mario David — Ernest Lapierre (the motorcyclist)
- Pierre Bertin — Belin (the shop owner)
- Ave Ninchi — Louise
- Jean-Louis Maury — Marcel
- Albert Dinan — Albert
- Sacha Briquet — Henri
- Claude Berri — André, Jane's boyfriend

== Release ==
The film was a commercial and critical failure in France, and wasn't shown in the United States until 1966, when it opened in New York City. The Los Angeles premiere was not before 1976.

== Reception ==
After the film's 1966 New York opening, Robert Alden of the New York Times found Chabrol's symbolism "overdone", but lauded the cinematography and performances, concluding that Les bonnes femmes was not a perfect, but "worthwhile" film which "deserves more recognition than it has had."

In 1999, Jonathan Rosenbaum of the Chicago Reader titled Les bonnes femmes "the best as well as the most disturbing" of Chabrol's films so far, reading the film's murder scene as a precursor to the climactic scene in Rainer Werner Fassbinder's miniseries Berlin Alexanderplatz. Upon the 2000 Los Angeles re-release, the Los Angeles Times reviewer saw "a sensitive study of character" and "one of his [Chabrol's] most individual—and most satisfying—works."

In the UK, critic Geoff Andrew rated the film "an ironic, witty study of human foibles" which "remains emotionally affecting thanks to Chabrol's unsentimental compassion for his subjects." Writing in The Guardian, David Thomson called it "one of Chabrol's best films, in which the four shopgirls he observes are all versions of the Emma Bovary dream. It's a great movie just because the people seem so ordinary and their lives so trivial."

In their 2011 list of "essential" Chabrol films, Indiewire described Les bonnes femmes as "a simultaneously heartbreaking and chillingly dark piece," and added that "the cruel world he [Chabrol] depicts... is a man's world, and women are just passing time in it."
