= Georges Rivière =

French actor (born 1924)

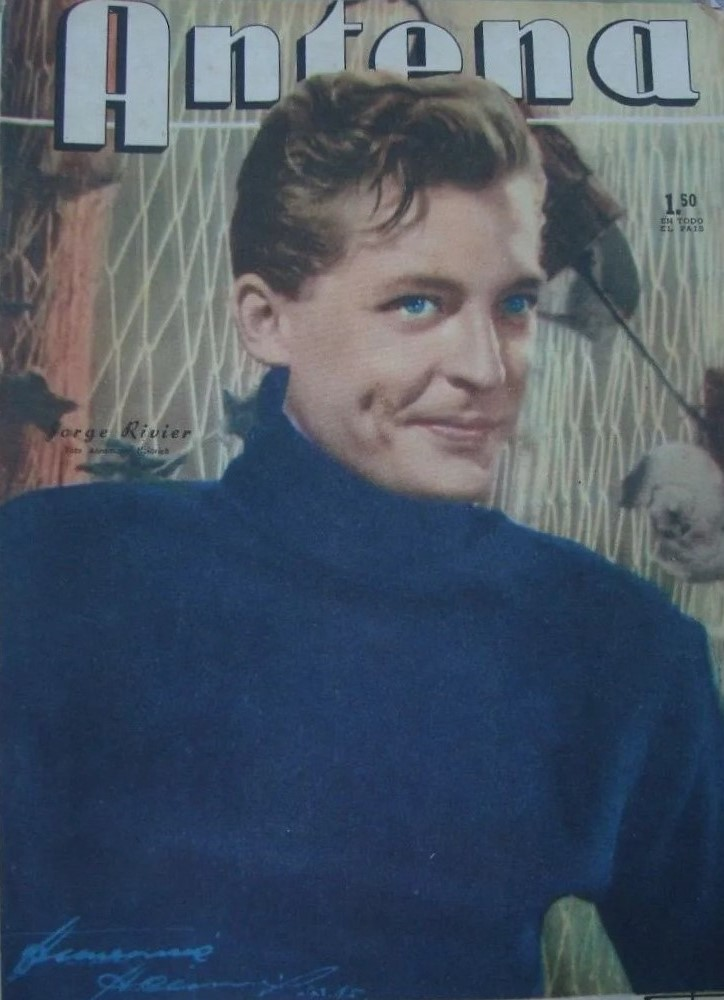
- Born: Georges Aristide Claude Félix Rivière; 1 July 1924; Neuilly-sur-Seine, France (Note: Certain online sources indicate a birth in 1920 in Tahiti.)
- Died: Ibiza, Spain
- Occupation: Actor
- Years active: 1948–1970
- Spouse: Lucile Saint-Simon

Georges Aristide Claude Félix Rivière (born 1 July 1924, date of death unknown) was a French actor who worked in Argentine cinema in the 1950s. He appeared in nearly 50 films between 1948 and 1970. Georges Rivière (sometimes referred to as Jorge Rivier) was considered the "beau of Argentine cinema" in the 1950s.

Rivière and his wife, actress Lucile Saint-Simon, later moved to Ibiza, Spain. She died on 23 May 2026, at the age of 93. It was noted that Rivière had predeceased her.

== Selected filmography ==
- The Lame Devil (1948) – Marquis de la Tour de Bournac
- The Black Vampire (1953) – Presumed guilty
- Mujeres casadas (1954)
- En carne viva (1954)
- Pájaros de cristal (1955) – Miguel Legrand – Mitia
- La delatora (1955)
- Bacará (1955)
- Mi marido y mi novio (1955)
- De noche también se duerme (1955)
- Alejandra (1956)
- La dama del millón (1956)
- Susana y yo (1957) – Arturo Hernán
- Las campanas de Teresa (1957)
- White Cargo (1958) – Raymond
- El calavera (1958)
- Un centavo de mujer (1958)
- Houla Houla (1959) – Dr. Gilbert Rousset
- Asphalte (1959) – Roger
- John Paul Jones (1959) – Russian chamberlain
- Visa pour l'enfer (1959) – Mario Balducci
- Normandie-Niémen (1960) – Le lieutenant Benoît
- “Le Passage du Rhin”(1960)-Jean
- Mistress of the World (1960) – Logan
- Tomorrow Is My Turn (1960) – Jean
- An American in Toledo (1960) – Arthur
- Crimen (1960) – Gaston Le Duke – Eleonora's Lover
- Journey Beneath the Desert (1961) – John
- The Last Judgment (1961) – Gianni
- Murder Party (1961) – Dahlberg
- The Game of Truth (1961) – Bertrand Falaise
- La Fayette (1962) – Vergennes
- Le Dernier Quart d'heure (1962) – L'inspecteur Bart
- The Longest Day (1962) – Sgt. Guy de Montlaur
- Mandrin (1962) – Mandrin
- The Four Musketeers (1963) – D'Artagnan
- The Accident (1963) – Julien
- Horror Castle (1963) – Max Hunter
- Le commissaire mène l'enquête (1963) – (segment "Pour qui sonne le ...")
- Anatomy of a Marriage: My Days with Jean-Marc (1964) – Philippe
- Anatomy of a Marriage: My Days with Françoise (1964) – Philippe
- Castle of Blood (1964) – Alan Foster
- Minnesota Clay (1964) – Fox
- The Glass Cage (1965) – Claude
- Agent 3S3: Passport to Hell (1965) – Professor Steve Dickson
- La donnaccia (1965)
- Les Chiens dans la nuit (1965) – Giorgos
- Run, Psycho, Run (1968) – Dr. Boyd
- Piège blond (1970) – Hugo
